= Namseong station =

Train station in Seoul, South Korea

남성 (유자병원); Namseong (U-ja Hospital)
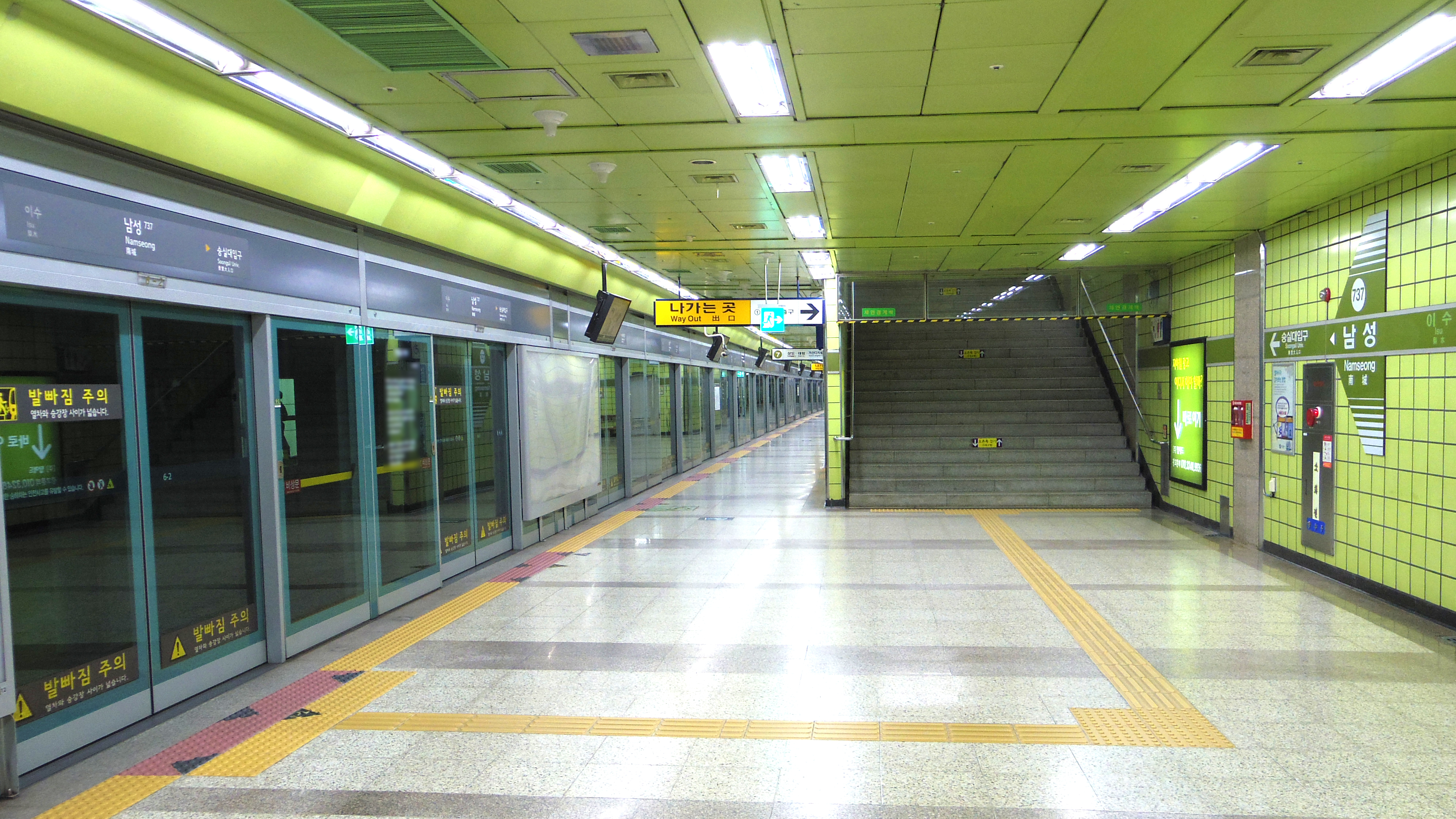

Korean name
- Hangul: 남성역
- Hanja: 南城驛
- Revised Romanization: Namseongnyeok
- McCune–Reischauer: Namsŏngnyŏk

General information
- Location: 25-33 Sadang-dong, 218 Sadangno Jiha, Dongjak-gu, Seoul
- Coordinates: 37°29′04″N 126°58′16″E
- Operator: Seoul Metro
- Line: Line 7
- Platforms: 2
- Tracks: 2

Construction
- Structure type: above

Key dates
- August 1, 2000: Line 7 opened
Location

Namseong Station is a station on the Seoul Subway Line 7.

== Station layout ==
Isu ↑
S/B | | N/B
↓ Soongsil University

Southbound	← ● Line 7 toward Seongnam
Northbound	● Line 7 toward Jangam →

== Vicinity ==
- Exit 1: Sadang Market
- Exit 2: Dongjak High School
- Exit 3: Sadang Middle School, Chongshin University
- Exit 4: Namseong Elementary School

Preceding station	Seoul Metropolitan Subway	Following station
Isu towards Jangam	Line 7	Soongsil University towards Seongnam
