= Soongsil University station =

Station of the Seoul Metropolitan Subway

숭실대입구 (살피재); Soongsil Univ. (Salpijae)
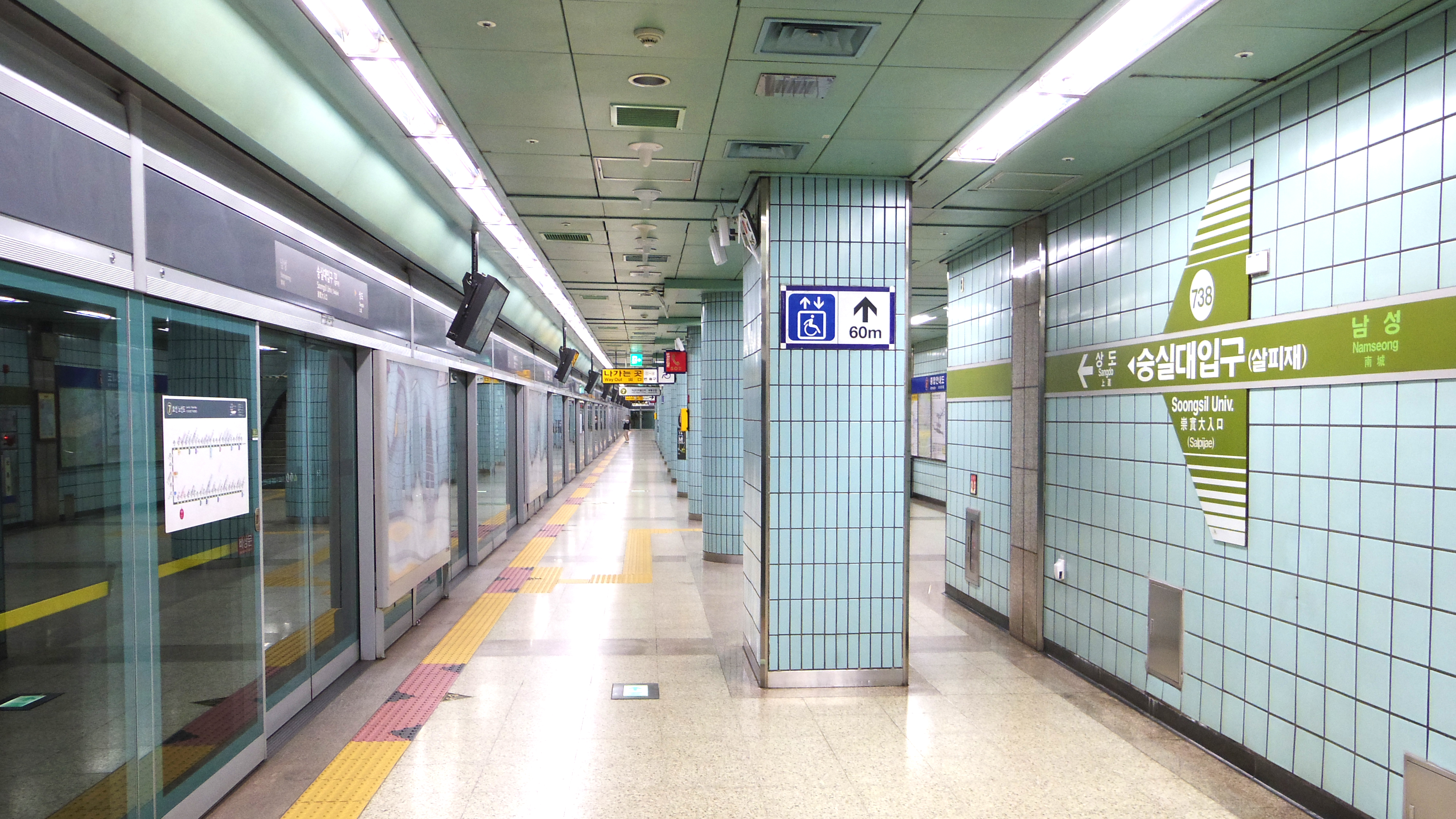

Korean name
- Hangul: 숭실대입구역
- Hanja: 崇實大入口驛
- Revised Romanization: Sungsildaeipgu-yeok
- McCune–Reischauer: Sungsildaeipku-yŏk

General information
- Location: 515 Sangdo-dong, 378 Sangdoro Jiha, Dongjak-gu, Seoul
- Coordinates: 37°29′46″N 126°57′14″E
- Operated by: Seoul Metro
- Line: Line 7
- Platforms: 2
- Tracks: 2

Construction
- Structure type: Underground

Key dates
- August 1, 2000: Line 7 opened
Location

Soongsil University Station is a station on Line 7 of the Seoul Subway. As its name indicates, it serves the nearby Soongsil University.

== Station layout ==
Namseong ↑
S/B | | N/B
↓ Sangdo

Southbound	← ● Line 7 toward Seongnam
Northbound	● Line 7 toward Jangam →

== Vicinity ==
- Exit 1 : Bonghyeon Elementary School
- Exit 2 : Joongang Heights APT
- Exit 3 : Soongsil University
- Exit 4 : Sanghyeon Middle School

Preceding station	Seoul Metropolitan Subway	Following station
Namseong towards Jangam	Line 7	Sangdo towards Seongnam
