= Jangseungbaegi station =

Train station in Seoul, South Korea

Coordinates: 37°30′17″N 126°56′21″E

장승배기; Jangseungbaegi
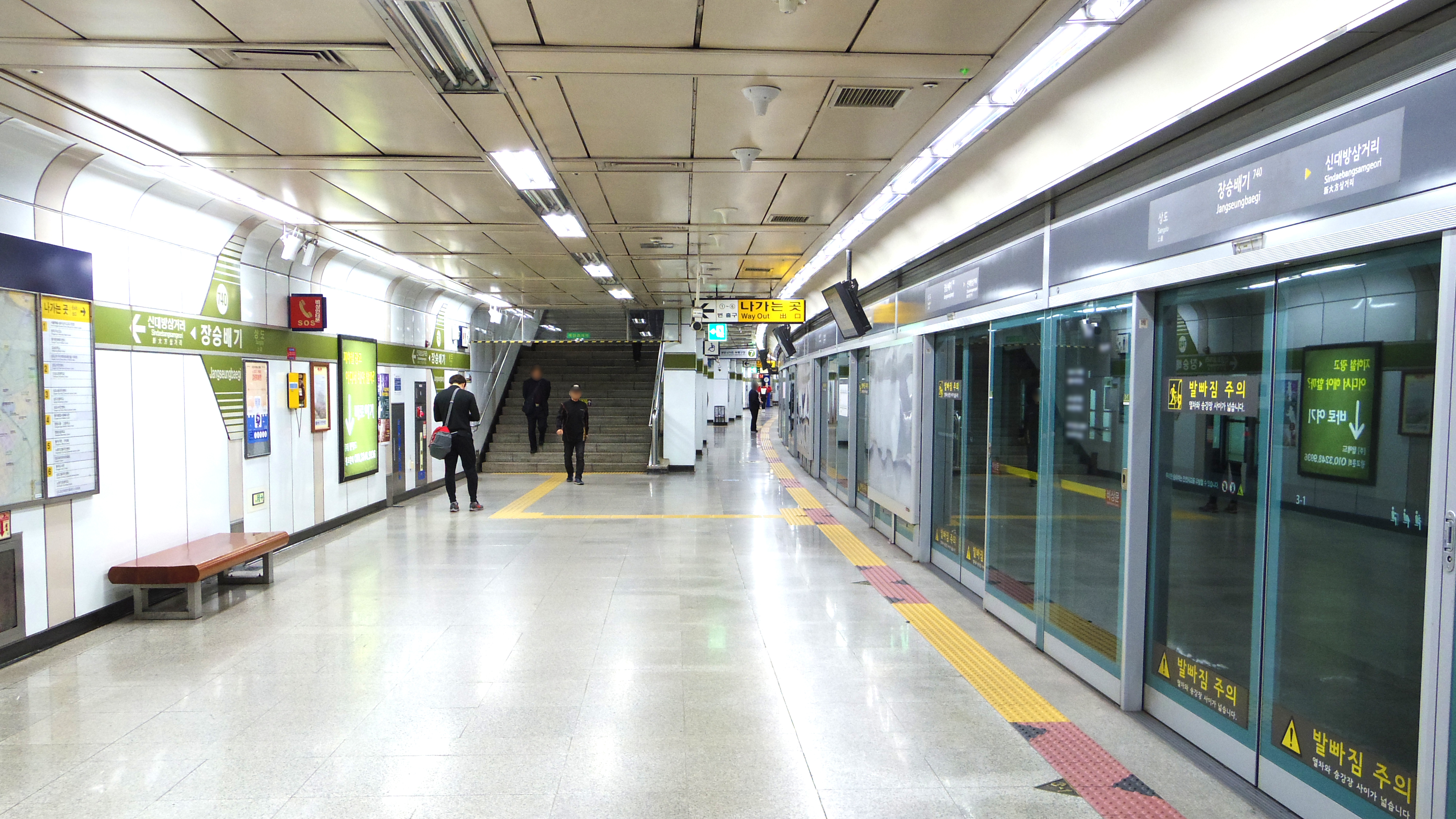

Korean name
- Hangul: 장승배기역
- Hanja: 장승배기驛
- Revised Romanization: Jangseungbaegi-yeok
- McCune–Reischauer: Changsŭngbaegi-yŏk

General information
- Location: 26-20 Sangdo-dong, 188 Sangdoro Jiha, Dongjak-gu, Seoul
- Operated by: Seoul Metro
- Line(s): Line 7
- Platforms: 2
- Tracks: 2

Construction
- Structure type: Underground

Key dates
- August 1, 2000: Line 7 opened

Jangseungbaegi Station (Korean: 장승배기역) is a station on the Seoul Subway Line 7.

The station's relatively long name is taken from that of the neighborhood of the same name. The neighborhood's name, in turn, is derived from an abundance of Korean village guardians (jangseung), erected in the 18th century by King Jeongjo of the Joseon Dynasty.

== Station layout ==
Sangdo ↑
| N/B
↓ Sindaebangsamgeori

Southbound	← ● Line 7 toward Seongnam
Northbound	● Line 7 toward Jangam →

Preceding station	Seoul Metropolitan Subway	Following station
Sangdo towards Jangam	Line 7	Sindaebangsamgeori towards Seongnam
