= Sangdo station =

Train station in Seoul, South Korea

상도; Sangdo
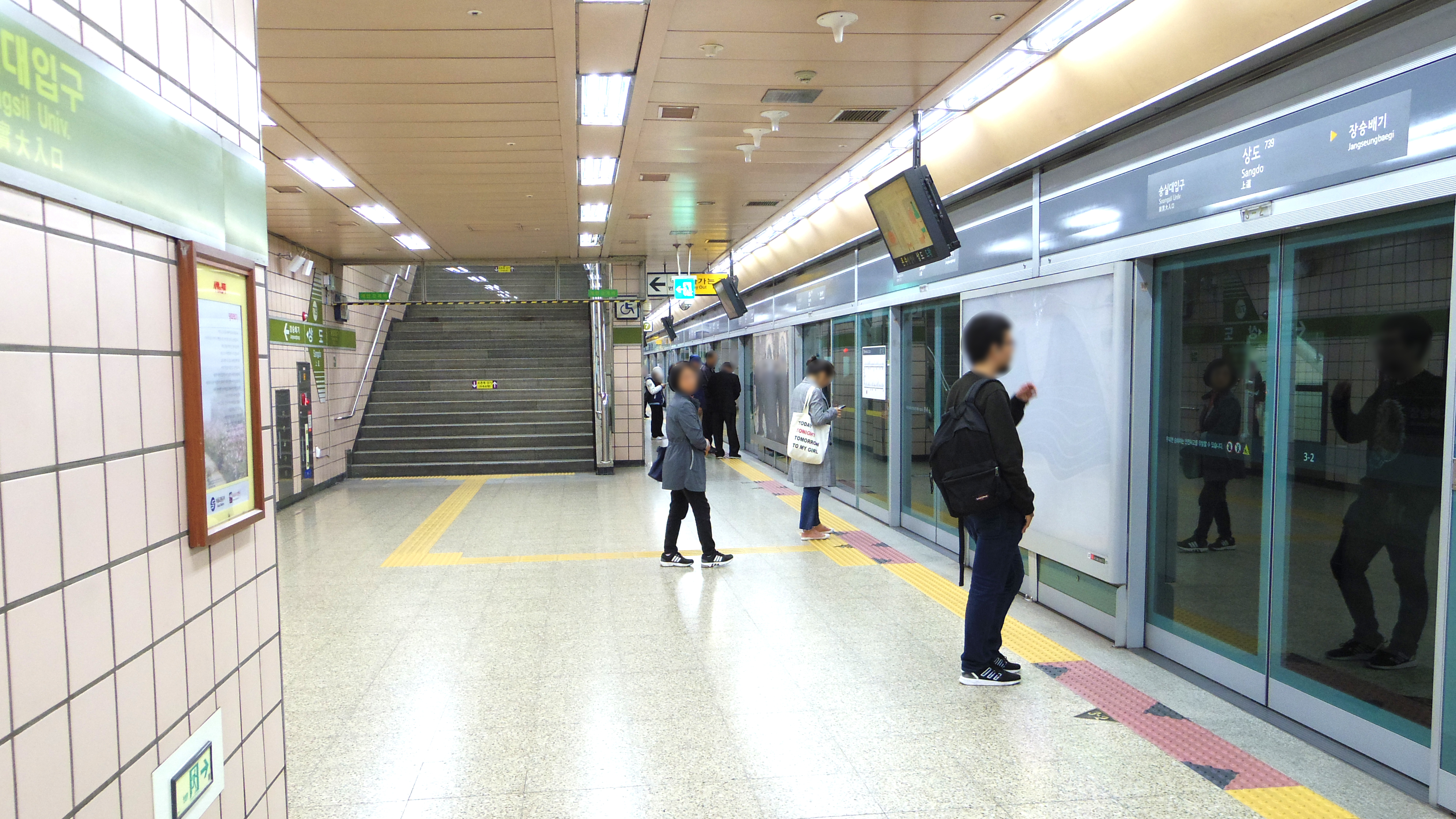

Korean name
- Hangul: 상도역
- Hanja: 上道驛
- Revised Romanization: Sangdo-yeok
- McCune–Reischauer: Sangdo-yŏk

General information
- Location: 702-1 Sangdo 1-dong, 272 Sangdoro Jiha, Dongjak-gu, Seoul
- Coordinates: 37°30′10″N 126°56′52″E
- Operated by: Seoul Metro
- Line(s): Line 7
- Platforms: 2
- Tracks: 2

Construction
- Structure type: Underground

Key dates
- August 1, 2000: Line 7 opened

Sangdo Station is a station on the Seoul Subway Line 7.

Prior to the opening of Heukseok station on Line 9, Sangdo's subname was 'Chung-Ang Univ.'. However, in June 2009, the subname was removed because of the opening of 'Heukseok (Chung-Ang Univ.)'.

== Station layout ==
Soongsil University ↑
| N/B
↓ Jangseungbaegi

Southbound	← ● Line 7 toward Seongnam
Northbound	● Line 7 toward Jangam →

Preceding station	Seoul Metropolitan Subway	Following station
Soongsil University towards Jangam	Line 7	Jangseungbaegi towards Seongnam
