= Naebang station =

Metro station in Seoul, South Korea

내방 (유정아트센터); Naebang (uJung Art Center)
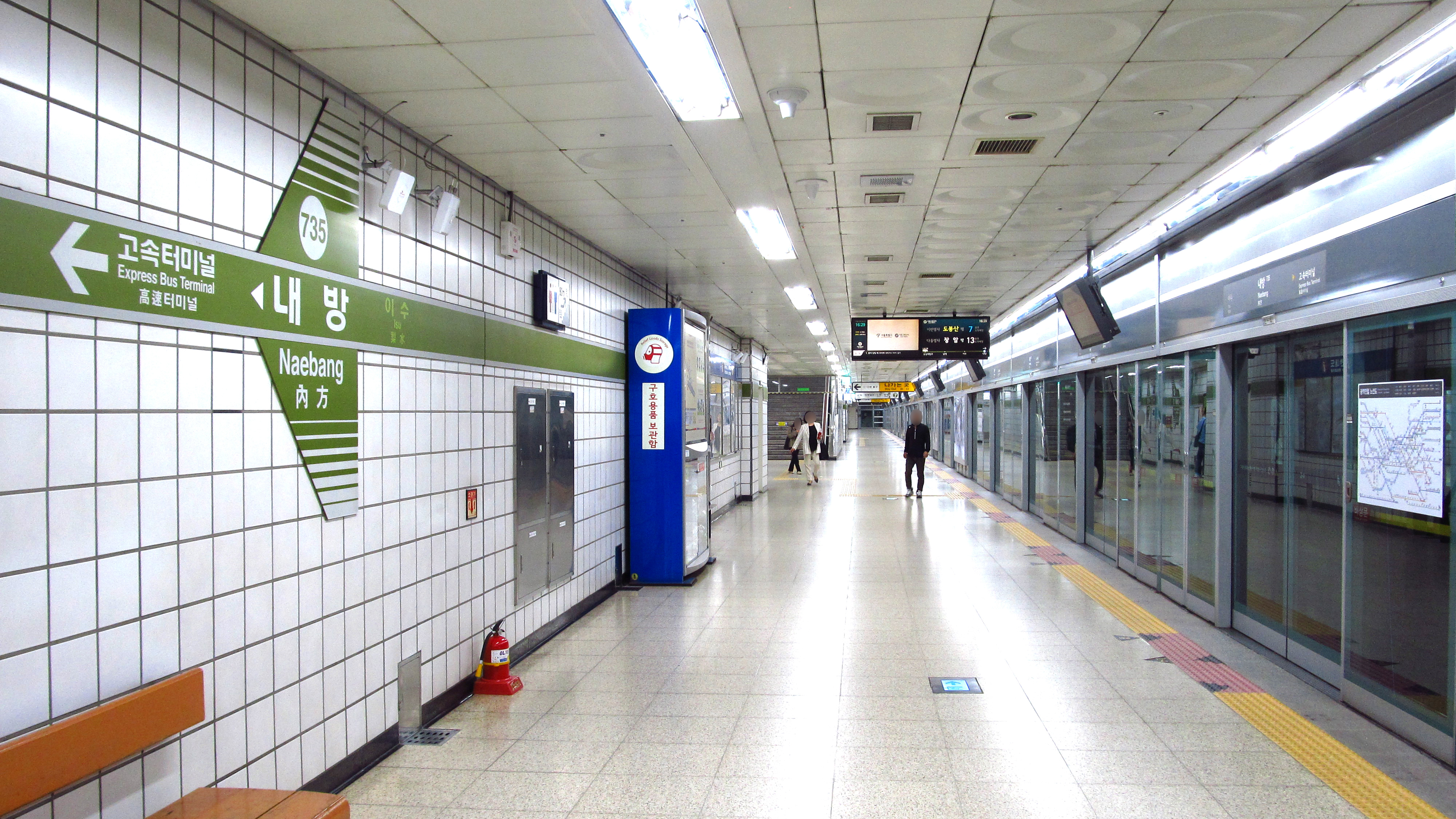

Korean name
- Hangul: 내방역
- Hanja: 內方驛
- Revised Romanization: Naebangnyeok
- McCune–Reischauer: Naebangnyŏk

General information
- Location: 874 Bangbae 4-dong, Seocho-gu, Seoul
- Coordinates: 37°29′16″N 126°59′37″E
- Operator: Seoul Metro
- Line: Line 7
- Platforms: 2
- Tracks: 2

Construction
- Structure type: Underground

Key dates
- August 1, 2000: Line 7 opened
Location

Naebang Station is a station on the Seoul Subway Line 7. To avoid confusion with Bangbae Station on Seoul Subway Line 2, the station was named as "inner (내, 內) of Bangbae-dong (방, 方)."

== Station layout ==
Express Bus Terminal ↑
S/B | | N/B
↓ Isu

Southbound	← ● Line 7 toward Seongnam
Northbound	● Line 7 toward Jangam →

== Vicinity ==
- Exit 1 : Seoripul Park
- Exit 2 : Bangil Elementary School
- Exit 3 :
- Exit 4 : Namseoul Market
- Exit 5 : Bangbae Elementary School
- Exit 6 : Isu Central Market
- Exit 7 : Bangbae Post Office
- Exit 8 : Bangbae Middle School

Preceding station	Seoul Metropolitan Subway	Following station
Express Bus Terminal towards Jangam	Line 7	Isu towards Seongnam
