= Hak-dong station =

Train station in Seoul, South Korea

학동 (나누리병원); Hak-dong (Nanoori Hospital)
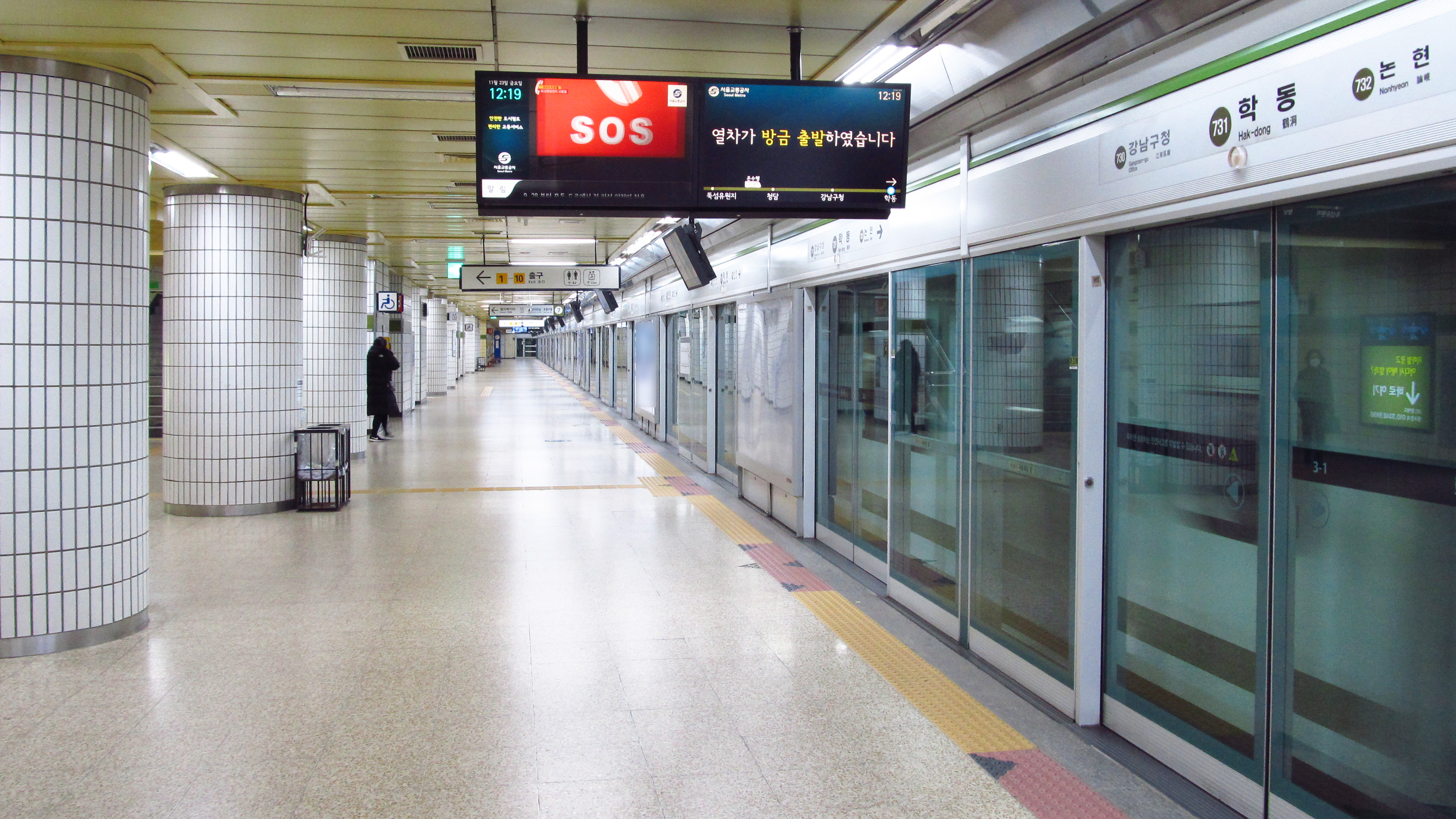
- Station Platform

Korean name
- Hangul: 학동역
- Hanja: 鶴洞驛
- Revised Romanization: Hakdongnyeok
- McCune–Reischauer: Haktongnyŏk

General information
- Location: 279-101 Nonhyeon-dong, 180 Hakdongno Jiha, Gangnam-gu, Seoul
- Coordinates: 37°30′51″N 127°01′54″E
- Operated by: Seoul Metro
- Line(s): Line 7
- Platforms: 2
- Tracks: 2

Construction
- Structure type: Underground

Key dates
- August 1, 2000: Line 7 opened

Hak-dong Station (Korean: 학동역) is a rapid transit station on Seoul Subway Line 7. It is located in Nonhyeon-dong, Gangnam District, Seoul. The area around the station was known as Hak-dong prior to 1982 and Hakdong intersection sits at the west end of the station. Nine buses service the station through 10 exits. The station services Nonhyeon 1-dong and Nonhyeon 2-dong. This station cannot be crossed in the opposite direction because the turnstiles are divided by direction.

== Station layout ==
Gangnam-gu Office ↑
| N/B
↓ Nonhyeon

Southbound	← ● Line 7 toward Seongnam
Northbound	● Line 7 toward Jangam →

== Average daily passenger numbers ==
Line	Passengers								
Line	2000	2001	2002	2003	2004	2005	2006	2007	2008
7	13043	18237	20397	20421	20665	21240	21268	21923	22095

Preceding station	Seoul Metropolitan Subway	Following station
Gangnam-gu Office towards Jangam	Line 7	Nonhyeon towards Seongnam
