= Isu station =

Train station in South Korea

Coordinates: 37.48777°N 126.98204°E

총신대입구 (이수); Chongshin Univ. (Isu)
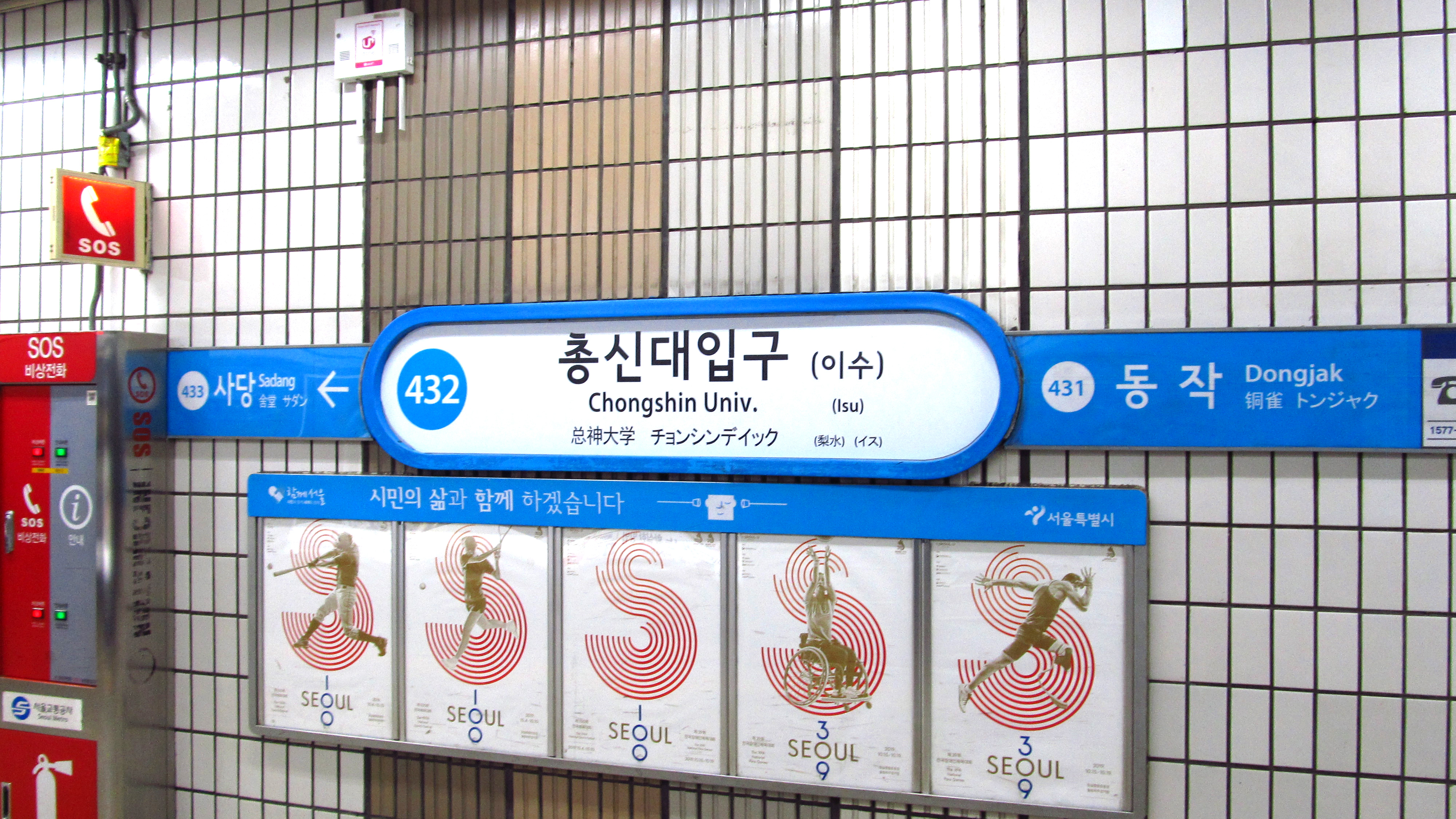
- Line 4

Korean name
- Hangul: 총신대입구역
- Hanja: 總神大入口驛
- Revised Romanization: Chongsindaeipgu-yeok
- McCune–Reischauer: Ch'ongsindaeipku-yŏk

General information
- Location: 736-1 Sadang-dong, 117 Dongjakdaero Jiha, Dongjak-gu, Seoul
- Operator: Seoul Metro
- Line: Line 4
- Platforms: 2
- Tracks: 2

Construction
- Structure type: Underground

Key dates
- October 18, 1985: Line 4 opened
Location

이수 (총신대입구); Isu (Chongshin Univ.)
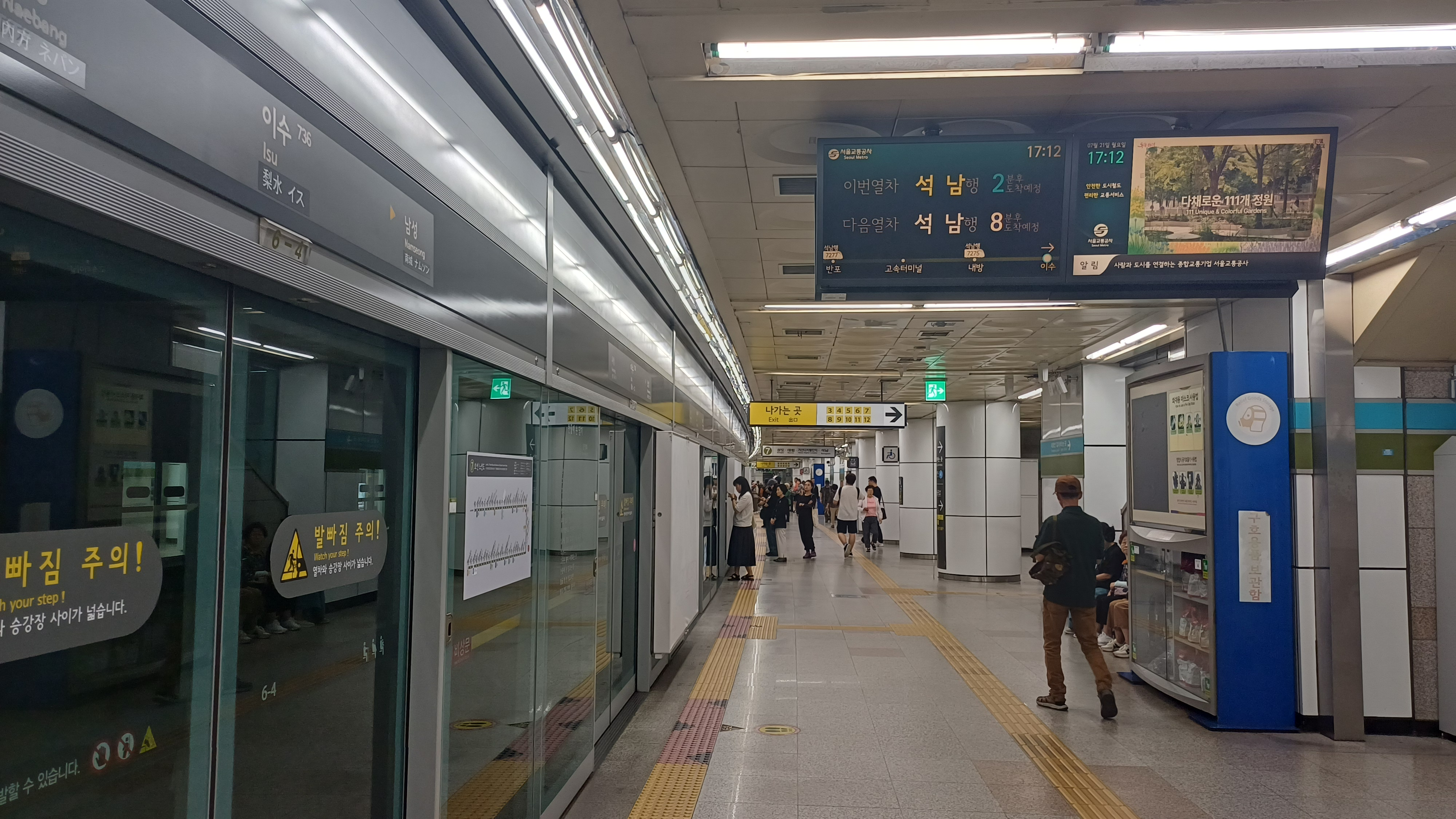
- Line 7

Korean name
- Hangul: 이수역
- Hanja: 梨水驛
- Revised Romanization: Isu-yeok
- McCune–Reischauer: Isu-yŏk

General information
- Location: 144-4 Sadang-dong, 310 Sadangno Jiha, Dongjak-gu, Seoul
- Operator: Seoul Metro
- Line: Line 7
- Platforms: 2
- Tracks: 2

Construction
- Structure type: Underground

Key dates
- August 1, 2000: Line 7 opened
Location

Isu Station (Korean: 이수역) is a subway station on the Seoul Subway Line 4 and Line 7 in Dongjak-gu, Seoul, South Korea.

Even though the Line 4 station is also called Chongshin University Station (Korean: 총신대입구역), it is a misnomer since the actual school of that name is a mile away into the western hills, and is much closer to other stations, especially Namseong Station.

== Station layout ==
=== Line 4 ===
Dongjak ↑
S/B | | N/B
↓ Sadang

Northbound	← ● Line 4 toward Jinjeop
Southbound	● Line 4 toward Oido →

=== Line 7 ===
Naebang ↑
S/B | | N/B
↓ Namseong

Southbound	← ● Line 7 toward Seongnam
Northbound	● Line 7 toward Jangam →

Both lines are two-sided, two-way platforms, with screen doors installed. There are four exits on Line 4 and ten on Line 7, with a total of 14. The stations on both lines are curved platforms, so the gap between the platform and the train is wide, so care must be taken not to fall out when getting on and off.

== Name ==
Before the construction of Seoul Subway Line 7, the station's name was officially Chongshin Univ. Station. However, after the construction of Line 7, Seoul Metro changed the name of the station to Isu Station and Namseong station became Namseong (Chongshin Univ.) Station because Namseong station is much closer to Chongshin University. The university sued Seoul Metro because the university wanted to express their school name at a transfer station to publicize their university. Although the university had lost their suit, the decision was reverted due to the university's violent protest. Therefore, Isu station currently holds two different names depending on the subway route, "Chongshin Univ. (Isu) station" for Line 4 and "Isu station" for Line 7. Then in 2019, the Line 7 station got renamed from "Isu station" to "Isu (Chongshin Univ.) station".

Preceding station	Seoul Metropolitan Subway	Following station
Dongjak towards Jinjeop	Line 4	Sadang towards Oido
Naebang towards Jangam	Line 7	Namseong towards Seongnam
