= Sadang =

Sadang may refer to:

- Sadang-dong
- Sadang station
- Sadang River
- Elbuchel Sadang
- Sadang, a Korean-language term for ancestral shrine
