= Bangbae-dong =

Neighborhood in Seoul, South Korea

Coordinates: 37°29′N 126°59′E

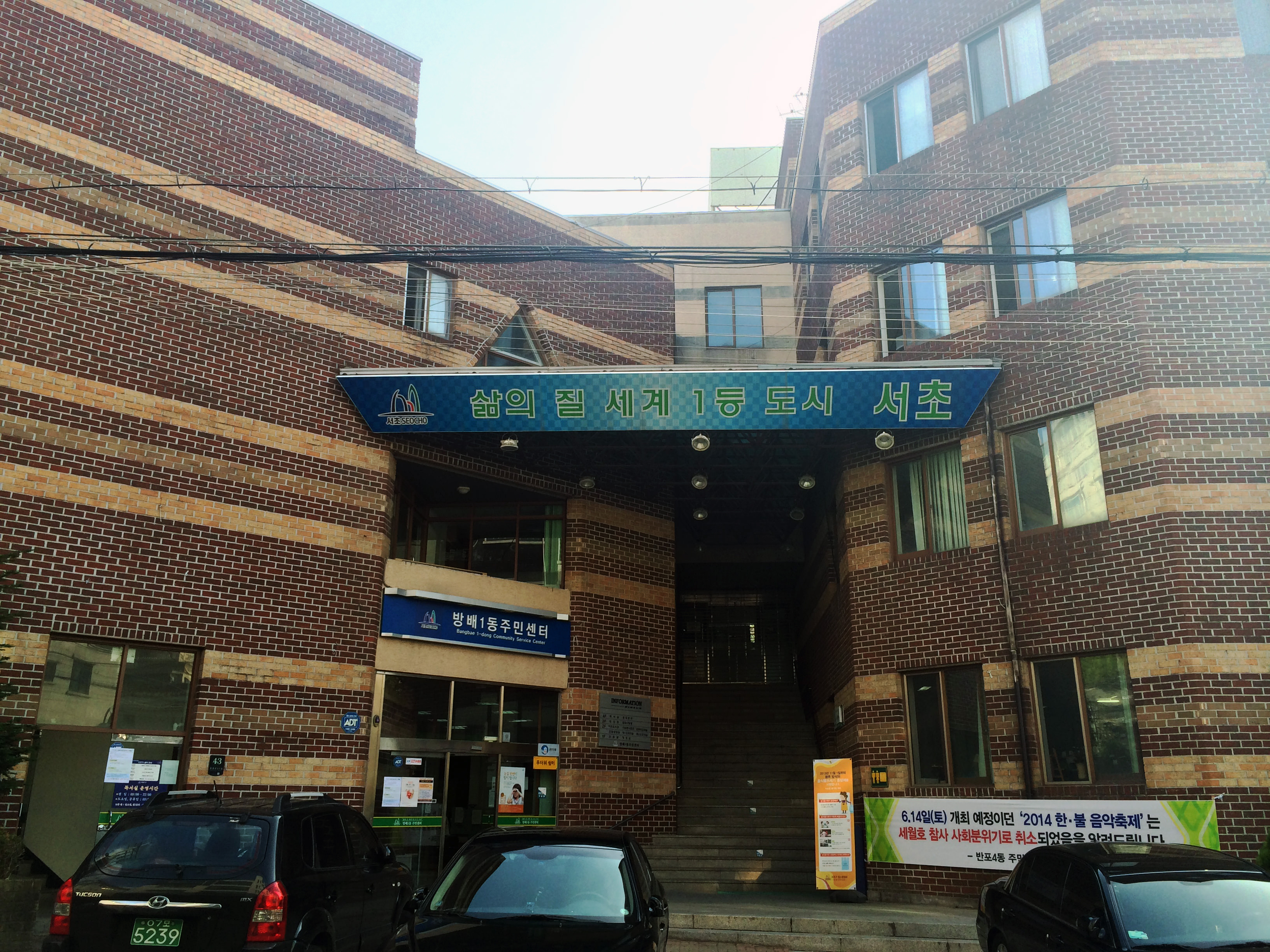
- Bangbae 1-dong Community Service Centre

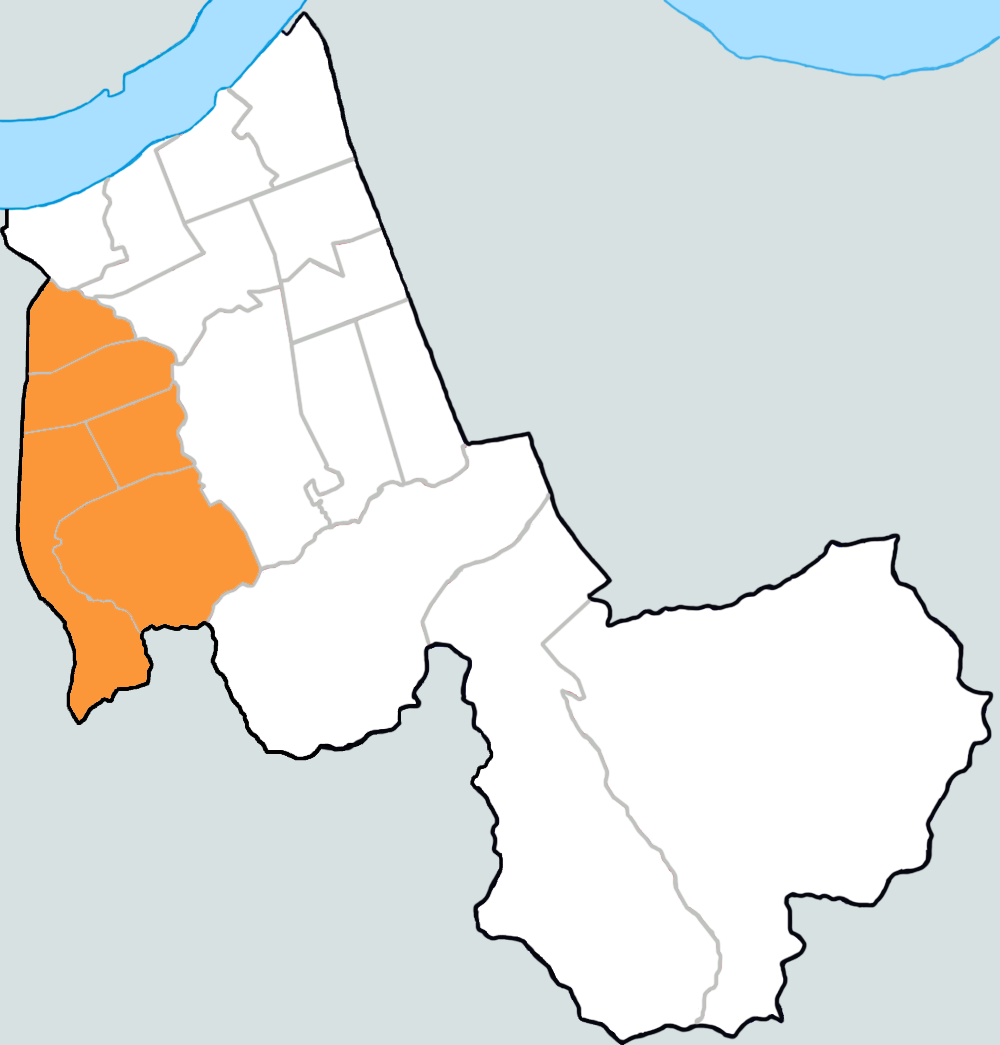
- Bangbae-dong within Seocho District
- Country: South Korea

Area
  - Total: 6.64 km^{2} (2.56 sq mi)

Population (2012)
  - Total: 120,020
  - Density: 18,100/km^{2} (46,800/sq mi)

Korean name
- Hangul: 방배동
- Hanja: 方背洞
- RR: Bangbae-dong
- MR: Pangbae-dong

Bangbae-dong (Korean: 방배동) is a dong (neighborhood) of the greater Gangnam area Seocho District of the South Korean city of Seoul. Bangbae-dong is divided into 5 different dongs which are Bangbaebon-dong, Bangbae 1-dong, 2-dong, 3-dong and 4-dong. The origin of Bangbae-dong is derived from the name Bangbae, meaning "dong-ri with my back to Mt. Myeon-ri," which rises on the border between Gwanak District and Seocho District. Bangbae-dong was Bangbae-ri, Sangbuk-myeon, Gwacheon-gun, Gyeonggi-do until the end of the Joseon Dynasty, but became Bangbae-ri, Sindong-myeon, Siheung-gun, Gyeonggi-do in 1914 when the area was confirmed during the Japanese colonial period. It was incorporated into the Seoul Metropolitan Government following the expansion of the Seoul Metropolitan Government's zone in 1963, and became Bangbae-dong to this day. The location is Dong at the western end of Seocho District, and it is an area from the intersection of the road from Seoul to Gwacheon and the southern circulation road to Umyeon Mountain.

== Education ==
- High Schools
  - Seoul Electronic High School
  - Dongdeok Women's High School
  - Sangmun High School
  - Suhmoon Girls' High School
- Middle Schools
  - Dongdeok Women's Middle School
  - Suhmoon Girls' Middle School
  - Isu Middle School
- Elementary Schools
  - Bangbae Elementary School
  - Banghyeon Elementary School
  - Bangil Elementary School
  - Isu Elementary School
  - Seorae Elementary School

== Transportation ==
- Bangbae Station of
- Sadang Station of and of
- Naebang Station of
- Isu Station of and of

== See also ==
- Administrative divisions of South Korea
