= Dongjak District =

District of Seoul, South Korea

Dongjak
- Autonomous District
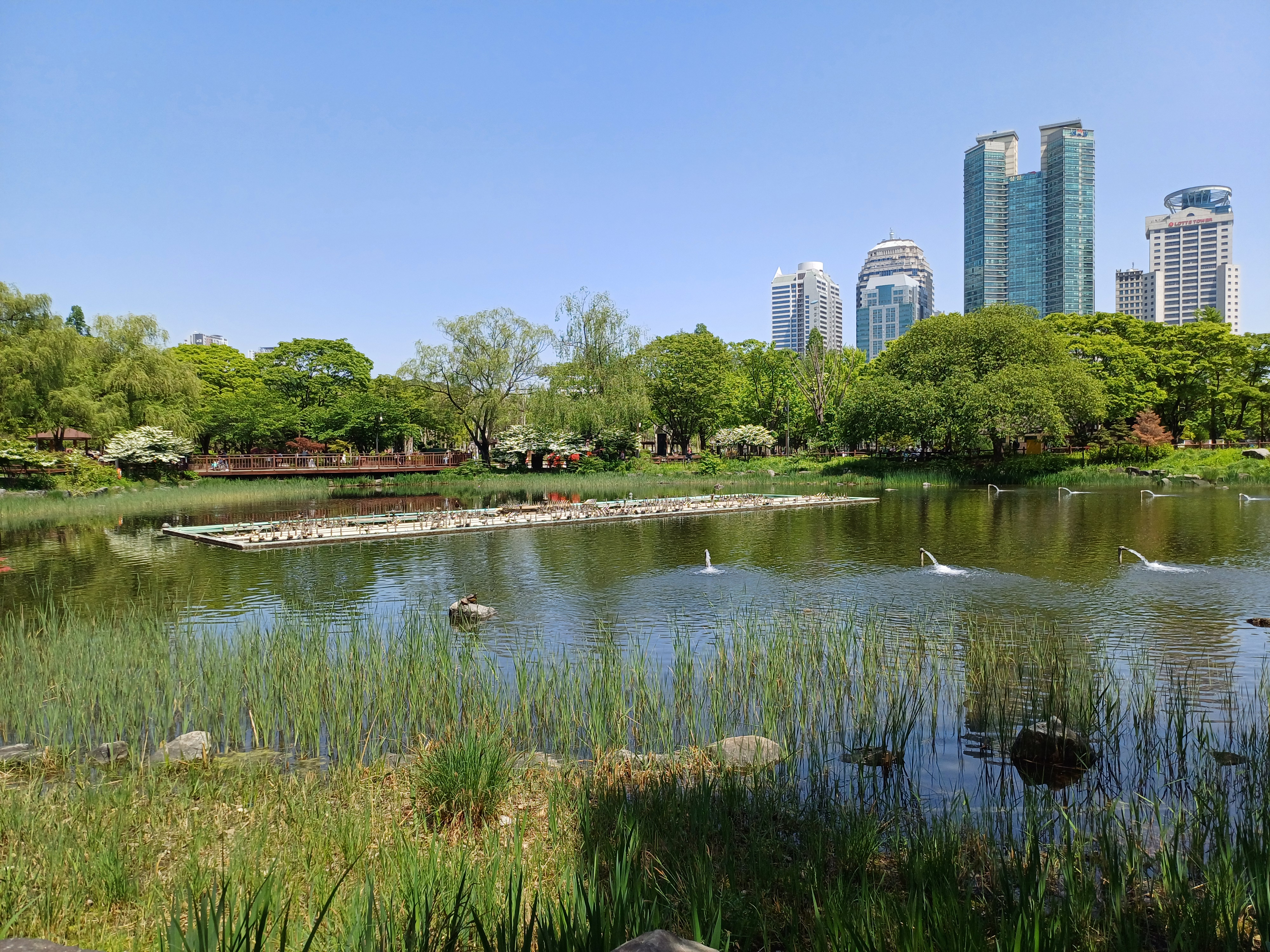
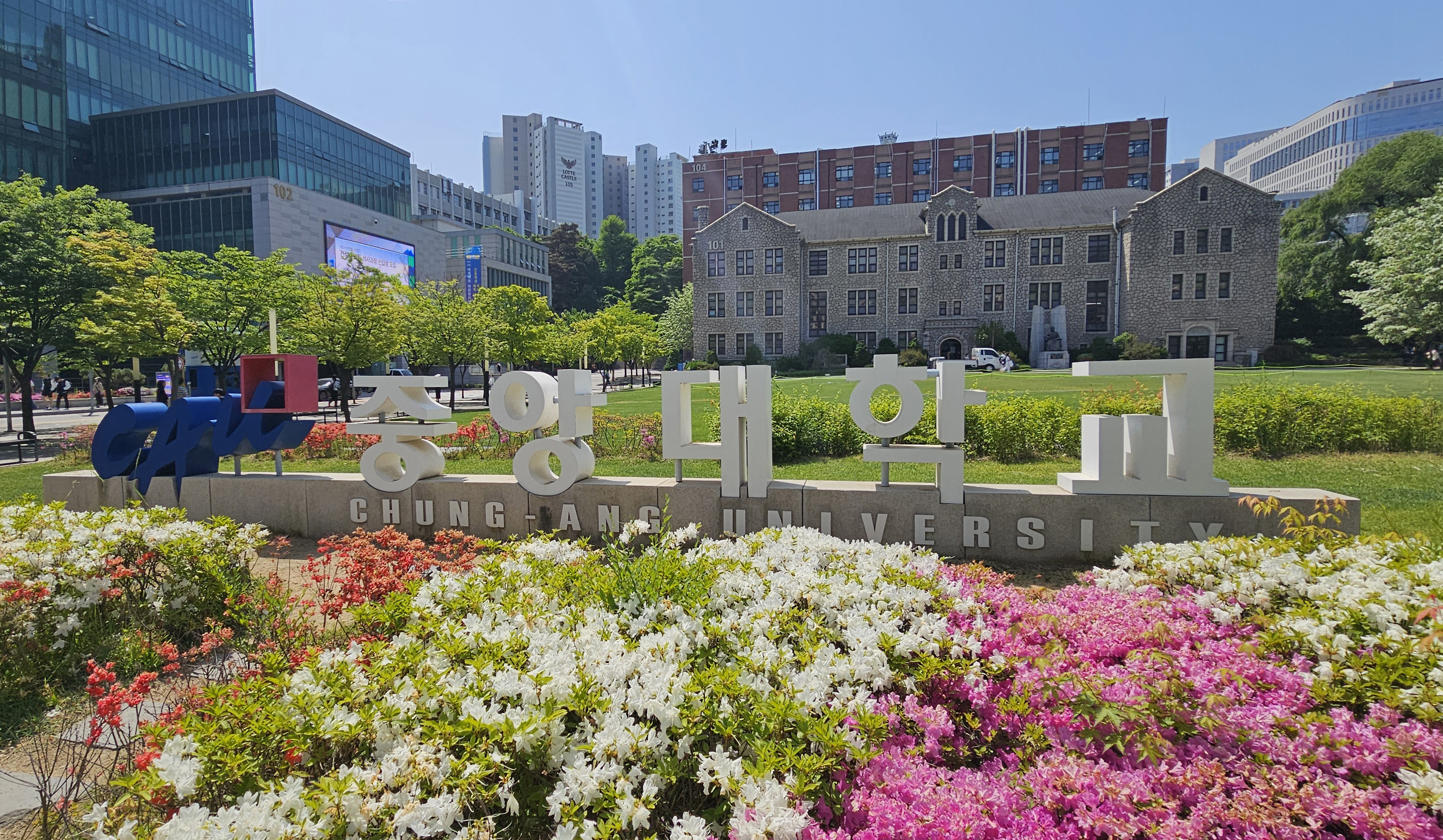
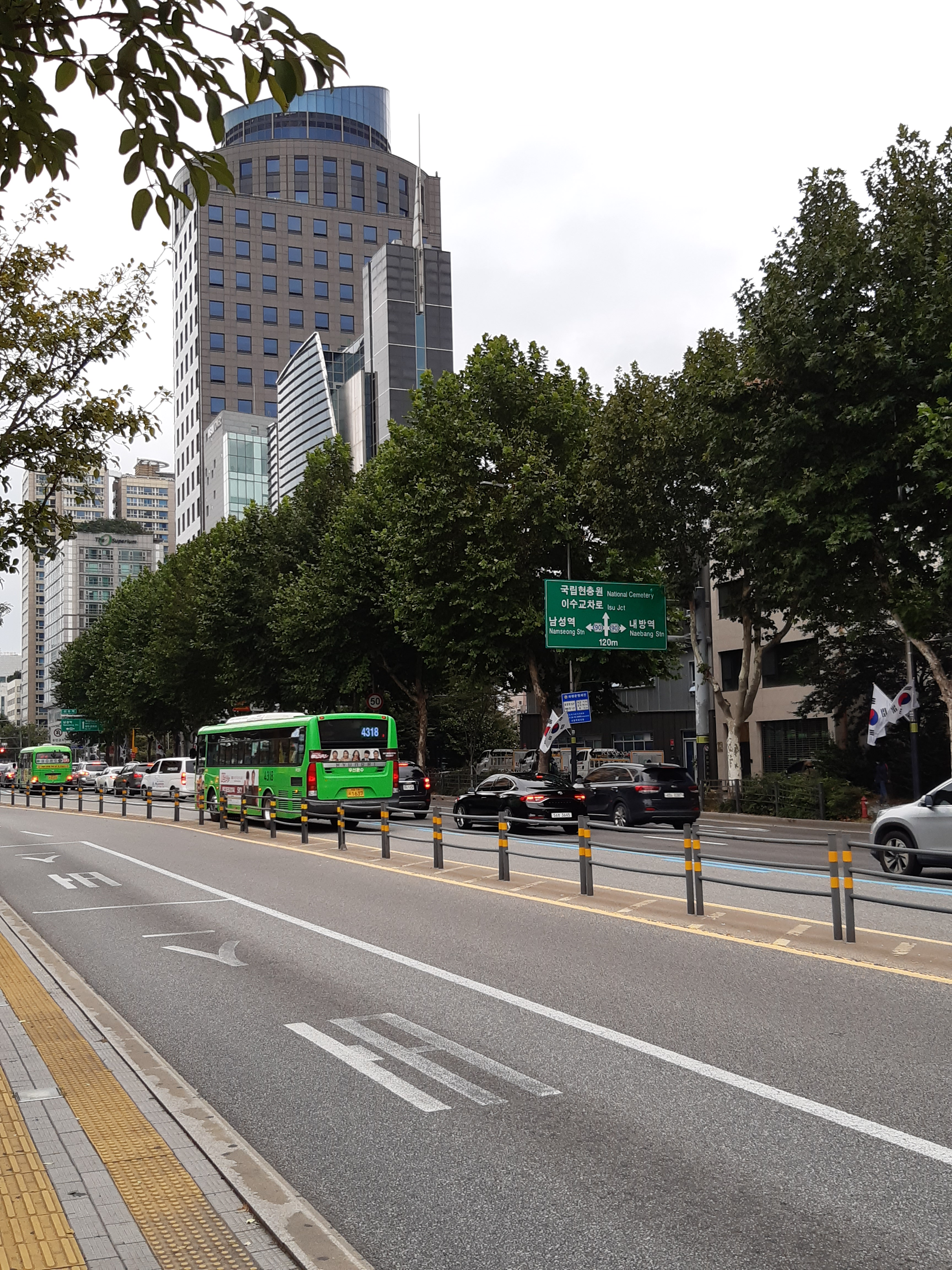
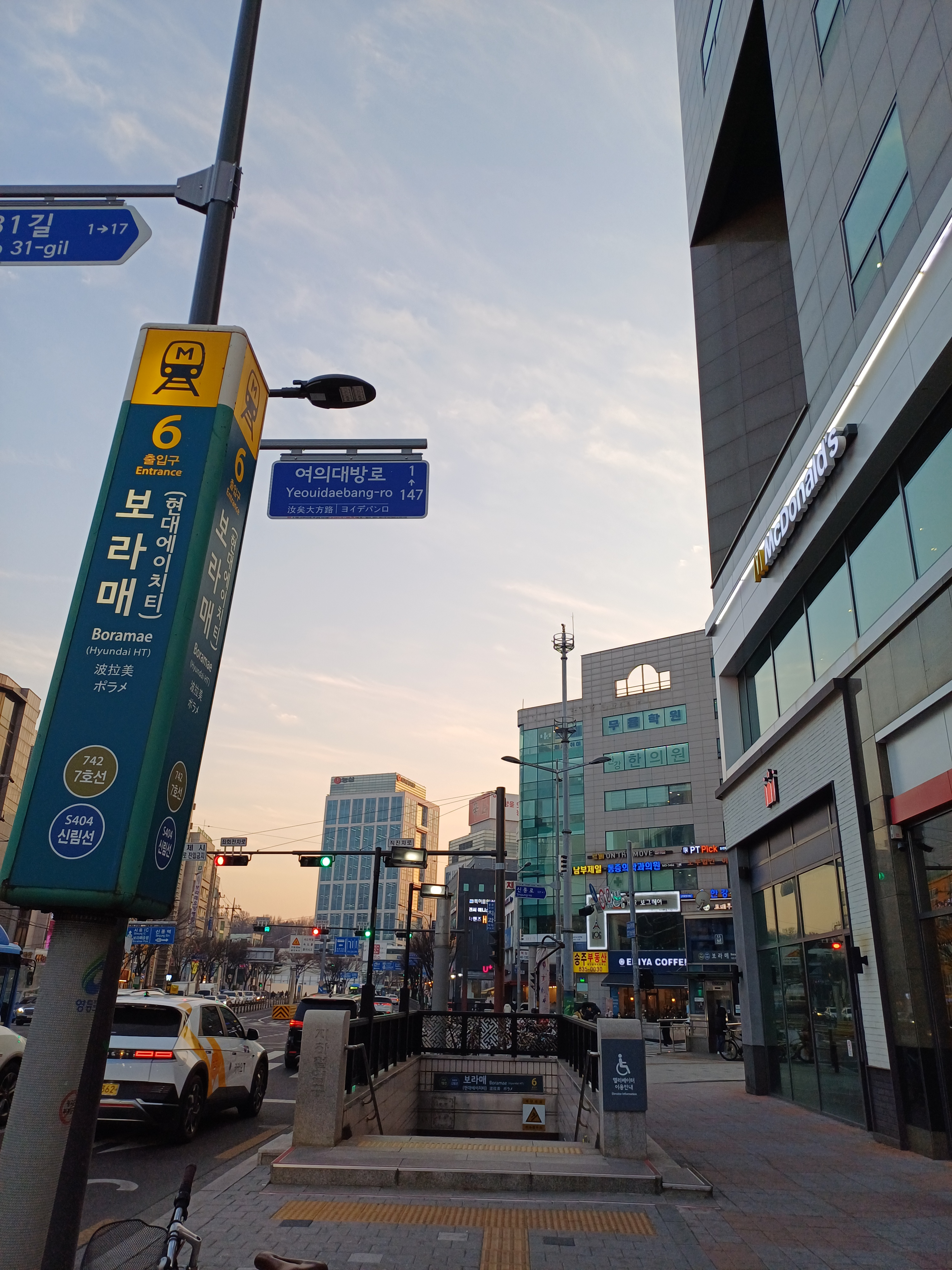
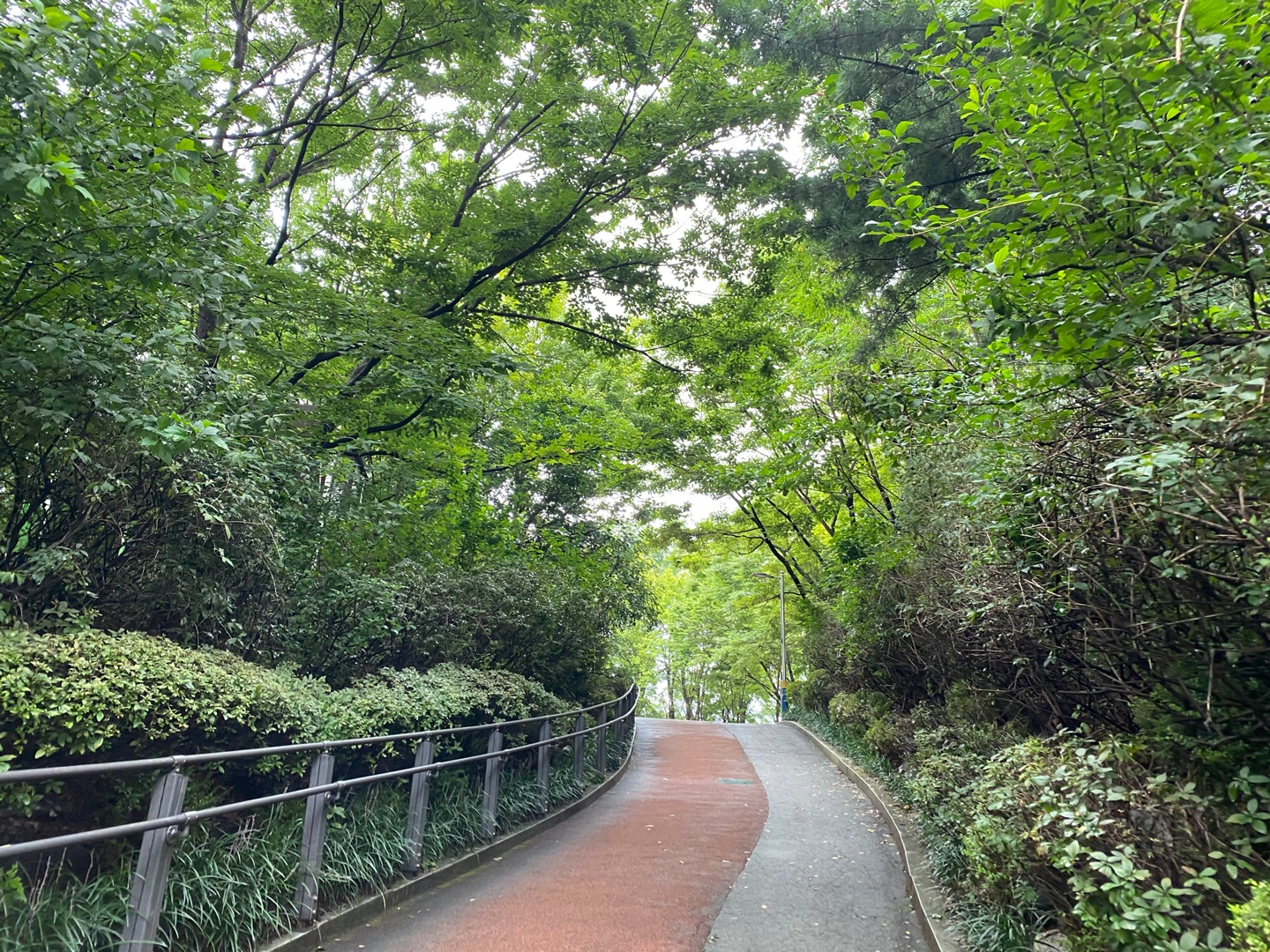
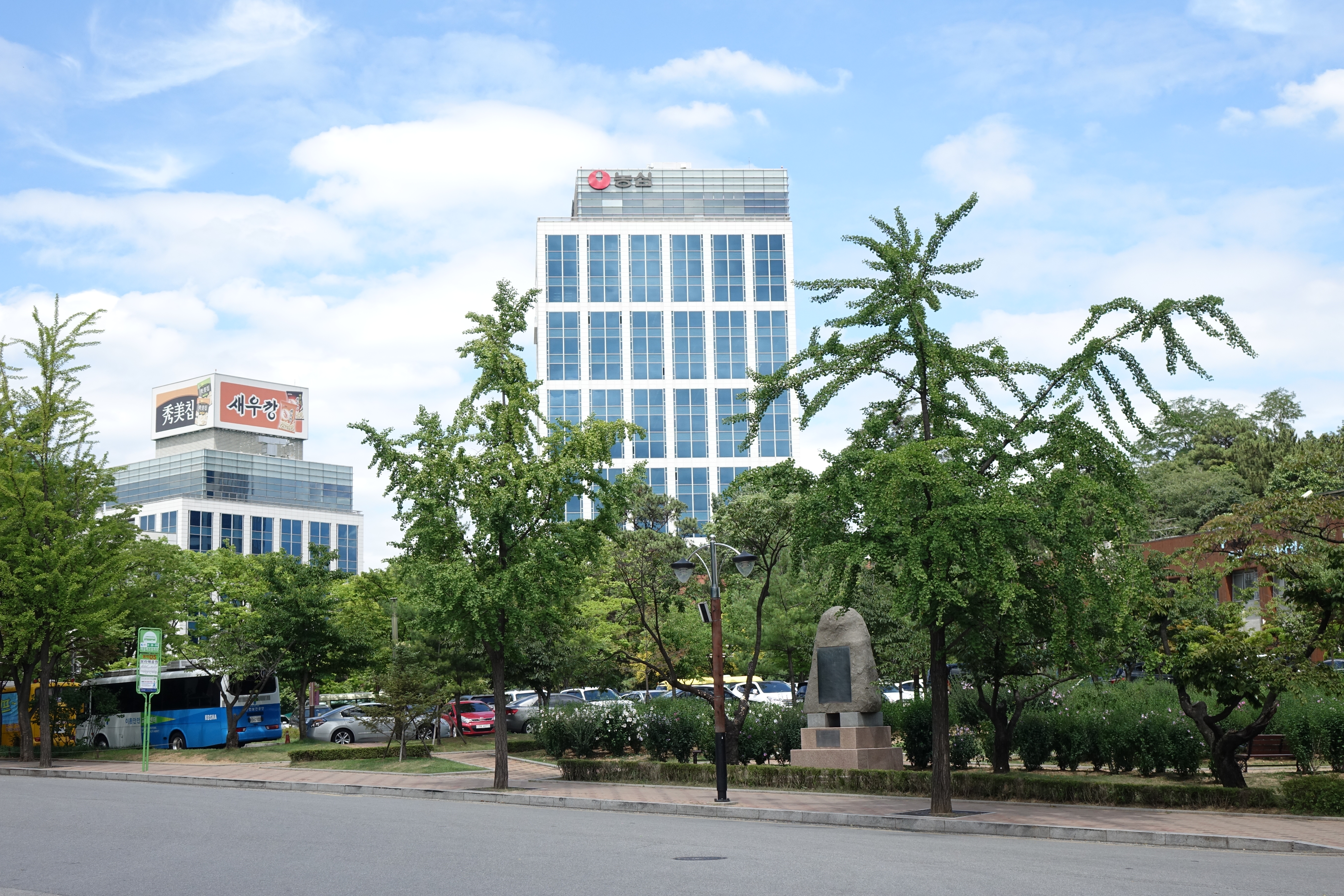
- Boramae Park Chung-Ang University Dongjak-daero Boramae Station Samil Park Nongshim headquarters

- Flag

- Location of Dongjak District in Seoul
- Interactive map of Dongjak
- Coordinates: 37°30′44.65″N 126°56′21.31″E
- Country: South Korea
- Region: Sudogwon
- Special City: Seoul
- Administrative dong: 15

Government
  - Body: Dongjak District Council
  - Mayor: Ryu Sam-young (Democratic)
  - MNAs: List of MNAs: Kim Byung-kee (Democratic); Lee Su-jin (Independent)

Area
  - Total: 16.35 km^{2} (6.31 sq mi)

Population (2010)
  - Total: 397,317
  - Density: 24,300/km^{2} (62,940/sq mi)
- Time zone: UTC+9 (Korea Standard Time)
- Postal code.: 06900 – 07199
- Area code(s): +82-2-500,800~
- Website: Dongjak District official website

Korean name
- Hangul: 동작구
- Hanja: 銅雀區
- RR: Dongjak-gu
- MR: Tongjak-ku

Dongjak District (Korean: 동작구) is one of the 25 districts that make up the city of Seoul, South Korea. Its name was derived from the Dongjaegi Naruteo Ferry, on the Han River which borders the district to the north. It was the 17th gu created in Seoul, after being separated from Gwanak District on 1 April 1980.

== Administrative divisions ==
Administrative divisions

Dongjak District is divided into 15 dong:

- Daebang-dong
- Heukseok-dong (all of this dong was combined in January 2008)
- Noryangjin-dong 1, 2 (Bon-dong was combined with Noryangjin 1-dong in September 2008)
- Sadang-dong 1, 2, 3, 4, 5 (Dongjak-dong was combined with Sadang 2-dong in September 2008)
- Sangdo-dong 1, 2, 3, 4 (2 and 5 dong were combined in January 2008)
- Sindaebang-dong 1, 2

== Education ==
Dongjak District is home to Chongshin University, the Seoul campus of Chung-Ang University, and Soongsil University.

Noryangjin-dong, especially near Noryangjin Station is known for private institutes or Hagwons, for college admission test and civil service examinations.

== Transportation ==
=== Railways ===
- Korail

- Seoul Subway Line 1

(Yeongdeungpo-gu) ← Daebang — Noryangjin → (Yongsan-gu)

- Seoul Metro

- Seoul Subway Line 2 Circle Line

(Seocho-gu) ← Sadang → (Gwanak-gu) ← Sindaebang → (Guro-gu)

- Seoul Subway Line 4

(Yongsan-gu) ← Dongjak — Isu — Sadang Station → (Seocho-gu)

- Seoul Subway Line 7

(Seocho-gu) ← Isu — Namseong — Soongsil University — Sangdo — Jangseungbaegi — Sindaebangsamgeori → (Yeongdeungpo-gu)

- Seoul Metro Line 9 Corporation

- Seoul Subway Line 9

(Yeongdeungpo-gu) ← Noryangjin — Nodeul — Heukseok — Dongjak → (Seocho-gu)

== Sister cities ==
- Surrey, British Columbia, Canada
- (United States) Bergen County, New Jersey, USA
- Pinggu, China
- Dunhua, Jilin, China
- Tahara, Aichi, Japan
- Bayanzürkh, Mongolia

== People from Dongjak District ==
- Lee Min-ho (Korean: 이민호), actor, singer, and model.
- Kim Nam-joon (Korean: 김남준; stage name RM), rapper, songwriter, record producer, and leader of boy band BTS.
- Jung Hae-in (Korean: 정해인), actor, and model.
