= Dongjak-dong =

Neighborhood in Seoul, South Korea

- Interactive map of Dongjak-dong
- Coordinates: 37.499°N 126.974°E
- Country: South Korea

Area
  - Total: 2.48 km^{2} (0.96 sq mi)

Population (2001)
  - Total: 21,928
  - Density: 8,842/km^{2} (22,900/sq mi)

Korean name
- Hangul: 동작동
- Hanja: 銅雀洞
- RR: Dongjak-dong
- MR: Tongjak-tong

Dongjak-dong (Korean: 동작동) is a dong (neighborhood) of Dongjak District, Seoul, South Korea.

== See also ==
- Administrative divisions of South Korea
