= Bon-dong =

Neighborhood in Seoul, South Korea

Coordinates: 37.512°N 126.953°E

- neighborhood
- Interactive map of Bon-dong
- Country: South Korea

Area
  - Total: 0.75 km^{2} (0.29 sq mi)

Population (2001)
  - Total: 14,068
  - Density: 19,000/km^{2} (49,000/sq mi)

Korean name
- Hangul: 본동
- Hanja: 本洞
- RR: Bon-dong
- MR: Pon-dong

Bon-dong (Korean: 본동) is a dong (neighborhood) of Dongjak District, Seoul, South Korea.

== See also ==
- Administrative divisions of South Korea
