= Seoul Subway Line 7 =

Subway line in Gyeonggi-do, Incheon and Seoul, South Korea

Line 7
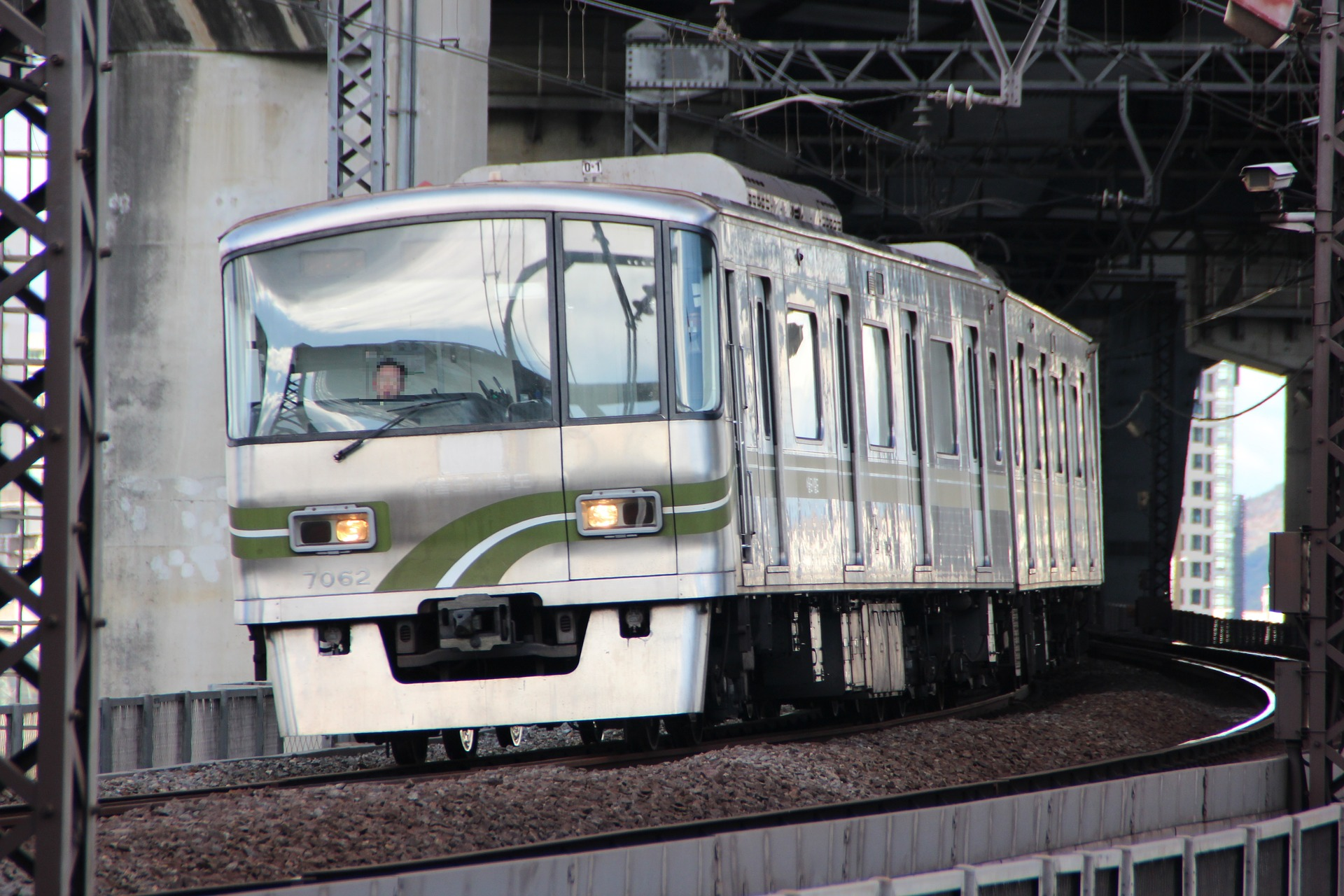

Overview
- Native name: 7호선(七號線); Chil Hoseon
- Status: Operational
- Termini: Jangam / Dobongsan; Onsu / Seongnam
- Stations: 53

Service
- Type: Rapid transit
- System: Seoul Metropolitan Subway
- Operator(s): Seoul Metro, Incheon Transit Corporation
- Daily ridership: 852,631 (2024)
- Ridership: 312.06 million (2024) (▲1.2%)

History
- Opened: October 11, 1996; 30 years ago
- Last extension: 2021

Technical
- Line length: 60.1 km (37.3 mi)
- Num of tracks: 2

Seoul Subway Line 7 of the Seoul Metropolitan Subway was built from 1990 to 1996 (Jangam-Konkuk Univ.) and was completed on August 1, 2000 (central section 17 km (11 mi). Konkuk University to Sinpung); the western section between Sinpung and Onsu was put into service on February 29, 2000. This north-south line does not run through the city centre but links Gangnam directly to the northeastern districts of Seoul. In 2019, Line 7 had an annual ridership of 380 million or 1.04 million passengers per day. Although most trains run between Jangam and Seongnam, some trains short turn at Onsu station and some trains start at Dobongsan station.

Line 7 uses a dark yellow-green triangle shape for its station sign design, which it shares with Lines 5 and 8. The upper half of the triangle contains the station number, with the English and Hanja names of the station displayed in the bottom half. The middle of the triangle displays the Hangul name of the station. The triangle is pointed in the direction that trains run; an arm jutting out of the apex displays the next station, while another arm projects out of the straight side in the back, pointing to the previous station. This design is similar to the design used in Line 6, but with a triangle instead of a chevron.

All trains on Line 7 are monitored by 1,008 closed-circuit television cameras that were installed in June 2012.

The extension to Incheon Subway Line 1 was designed to relieve the traffic congestion in western Seoul and northern Incheon. Nine stations were added on October 27, 2012, for the 10.2 km (6.3 mi) extension, starting from Onsu Station of Line 7 and ending at Bupyeong-gu Office Station of Incheon Subway Line 1.

Line 7 was extended west of Bupyeong-gu Office. Construction on the two-station, 3.94 km (2.45 mi) extension to Seongnam began in 2013 and was completed on May 22, 2021. The extension allows for transfers to Incheon Subway Line 2.

== Expansion ==
A further seven-station extension to Cheongna International City station through Cheongna International City is currently planned and is not expected to open any earlier than 2027; the extension will allow for transfers to the airport railroad. Another further two-station extension through Incheon's metropolitan landfill to Geomdan Oryu station is also currently being planned.

Line 7 is also being extended north of Jangam to Yangju and Pocheon in two phases. The first phase, which started construction in late 2019 and is planned to open in 2027, will feature two stations, one of which will be Tapseok station, providing transfers to the Uijeongbu LRT. The second phase, which is still in planning, will feature four additional stations. The second phase may be operated as a shuttle service.

== Operation ==
Although the line is mostly operated by Seoul Metro, the section beyond Onsu, between Kkachiul and Seongnam (including the future extension to Cheongna Int'l City) is operated by Incheon Transit Corporation. Further, this section was funded as Bucheon and Incheon City metro, is considered a part of Incheon Metro rather than as a part of Seoul Subway, and serves as an east-west line through wider Incheon area.

Despite this, the entire line is operated as one, with all trains in the Incheon-operated section continuing onto the Seoul-operated section. Approximately half of trains in the Seoul-operated section continue onto the Incheon-operated section.

== Stations ==
=== Current Routes ===
- Jangam — Onsu/Seongnam
- Dobongsan — Onsu/Seongnam

=== Stations ===
The names of the stations to open in 2029 and 2031 are subject to change.

| Station number | Station name English | Station name Hangul | Transfer | Distance in km | Total distance | Location | |
|---|---|---|---|---|---|---|---|
| 703 | Pocheon (2031) | 포천 | | --- | --- | Gyeonggi-do | Pocheon-si |
| 704 | Seondan (2031) | 선단 | | --- | --- | Gyeonggi-do | Pocheon-si |
| 705 | Soheul (2031) | 소흘 | | --- | --- | Gyeonggi-do | Pocheon-si |
| 706 | Okjeong Jungang (2031) | 옥정중앙 | | --- | --- | Gyeonggi-do | Yangju-si |
| 707 | Goeup (2029) | 고읍 | | --- | --- | Gyeonggi-do | Yangju-si |
| 708 | Tapseok (2029) | 탑석 | U Line | --- | --- | Gyeonggi-do | Uijeongbu-si |
| 709 | Jangam | 장암 | | --- | 0.0 | Gyeonggi-do | Uijeongbu-si |
| 710 | Dobongsan | 도봉산 | Seoul Subway Line 1 | 1.4 | 1.4 | Seoul | Dobong-gu |
| 711 | Suraksan | 수락산 | | 1.6 | 3.0 | Seoul | Nowon-gu |
| 712 | Madeul | 마들 | | 1.4 | 4.4 | Seoul | Nowon-gu |
| 713 | Nowon | 노원 | Seoul Subway Line 4 | 1.2 | 5.6 | Seoul | Nowon-gu |
| 714 | Junggye (Korean Bible Univ.) | 중계 (한국성서대) | | 1.1 | 6.7 | Seoul | Nowon-gu |
| 715 | Hagye (Eulji Medical Center) | 하계 (을지대 을지병원) | | 1.0 | 7.7 | Seoul | Nowon-gu |
| 716 | Gongneung (Seoul National Univ. of Science and Technology) | 공릉 (서울과학기술대) | | 1.3 | 9.0 | Seoul | Nowon-gu |
| 717 | Taereung | 태릉입구 | Seoul Subway Line 6 | 0.8 | 9.8 | Seoul | Nowon-gu |
| 718 | Meokgol | 먹골 | | 0.9 | 10.7 | Seoul | Jungnang-gu |
| 719 | Junghwa | 중화 | | 0.9 | 11.6 | Seoul | Jungnang-gu |
| 720 | Sangbong (Intercity Bus Terminal) | 상봉 (시외버스터미널) | Gyeongui–Jungang Line Gyeongchun Line | 1.0 | 12.6 | Seoul | Jungnang-gu |
| 721 | Myeonmok (Seoil Univ.) | 면목 (서일대입구) | | 0.8 | 13.4 | Seoul | Jungnang-gu |
| 722 | Sagajeong (Green Hospital) | 사가정 (녹색병원) | | 0.9 | 14.3 | Seoul | Jungnang-gu |
| 723 | Yongmasan (Yongma Falls Park) | 용마산 (용마폭포공원) | | 0.8 | 15.1 | Seoul | Jungnang-gu |
| 724 | Junggok | 중곡 | | 0.9 | 16.0 | Seoul | Gwangjin-gu |
| 725 | Gunja (Neung-dong) | 군자 (능동) | Seoul Subway Line 5 | 1.1 | 17.1 | Seoul | Gwangjin-gu |
| 726 | Children's Grand Park (Sejong Univ.) | 어린이대공원 (세종대) | | 1.1 | 18.2 | Seoul | Gwangjin-gu |
| 727 | Konkuk Univ. | 건대입구 | Seoul Subway Line 2 | 0.8 | 19.0 | Seoul | Gwangjin-gu |
| 728 | Jayang (Ttukseom Hangang Park) | 자양 (뚝섬한강공원 | | 1.0 | 20.0 | Seoul | Gwangjin-gu |
| 729 | Cheongdam (Cheil Orthopedic Hospital) | 청담 (제일정형외과병원) | | 2.0 | 22.0 | Seoul | Gangnam-gu |
| 730 | Gangnam-gu Office | 강남구청 | Suin–Bundang Line | 1.1 | 23.1 | Seoul | Gangnam-gu |
| 731 | Hak-dong (Nanoori Hospital) | 학동 (나누리병원) | | 0.9 | 24.0 | Seoul | Gangnam-gu |
| 732 | Nonhyeon (Gangnam Brand Eye Clinic) | 논현 (강남브랜드안과) | Shinbundang Line | 1.0 | 25.0 | Seoul | Gangnam-gu |
| 733 | Banpo | 반포 | | 0.9 | 25.9 | Seoul | Seocho-gu |
| 734 | Express Bus Terminal | 고속터미널 | Seoul Subway Line 3 Seoul Subway Line 9 | 0.9 | 26.8 | Seoul | Seocho-gu |
| 735 | Naebang (uJung Art Center) | 내방 (유정아트센터) | | 2.2 | 29.0 | Seoul | Seocho-gu |
| 736 | Isu (Chongshin Univ.) | 이수 (총신대입구) | Chongshin Univ. (Isu) Station | 1.0 | 30.0 | Seoul | Dongjak-gu |
| 737 | Namseong | 남성 | | 1.0 | 31.0 | Seoul | Dongjak-gu |
| 738 | Soongsil University (Salpijae) | 숭실대입구 (살피재) | | 2.0 | 33.0 | Seoul | Dongjak-gu |
| 739 | Sangdo | 상도 | | 0.9 | 33.9 | Seoul | Dongjak-gu |
| 740 | Jangseungbaegi | 장승배기 | | 0.9 | 34.8 | Seoul | Dongjak-gu |
| 741 | Sindaebangsamgeori | 신대방삼거리 | | 1.2 | 36.0 | Seoul | Dongjak-gu |
| 742 | Boramae (Hyundai HT) | 보라매 (현대에이치티) | Sillim Line | 0.8 | 36.8 | Seoul | Yeongdeungpo-gu |
| 743 | Sinpung | 신풍 | | 0.9 | 37.7 | Seoul | Yeongdeungpo-gu |
| 744 | Daerim (Guro-gu Office) | 대림 (구로구청) | Seoul Subway Line 2 | 1.4 | 39.1 | Seoul | Yeongdeungpo-gu |
| 745 | Namguro | 남구로 | | 1.1 | 40.2 | Seoul | Guro-gu |
| 746 | Gasan Digital Complex (Mario Outlet) | 가산디지털단지 (마리오아울렛) | Seoul Subway Line 1 | 0.8 | 41.0 | Seoul | Geumcheon-gu |
| 747 | Cheolsan | 철산 | | 1.4 | 42.4 | Gyeonggi-do | Gwangmyeong-si |
| 748 | Gwangmyeongsageori | 광명사거리 | | 1.3 | 43.7 | Gyeonggi-do | Gwangmyeong-si |
| 749 | Cheonwang | 천왕 | | 1.7 | 45.4 | Seoul | Guro-gu |
| 750 | Onsu (Sungkonghoe Univ.) | 온수 (성공회대입구) | Seoul Subway Line 1 | 1.5 | 46.9 | Seoul | Guro-gu |
| 751 | Kkachiul | 까치울 | | 2.2 | 49.1 | Gyeonggi-do | Bucheon-si |
| 752 | Bucheon Stadium | 부천종합운동장 | Seohae Line | 1.2 | 50.3 | Gyeonggi-do | Bucheon-si |
| 753 | Chunui | 춘의 | | 0.9 | 51.2 | Gyeonggi-do | Bucheon-si |
| 754 | Sinjung-dong | 신중동 | | 1.0 | 52.2 | Gyeonggi-do | Bucheon-si |
| 755 | Bucheon City Hall (Bucheon Arts Center) | 부천시청 (부천아트센터) | | 1.1 | 53.3 | Gyeonggi-do | Bucheon-si |
| 756 | Sang-dong | 상동 | | 0.9 | 54.2 | Gyeonggi-do | Bucheon-si |
| 757 | Samsan Gymnasium | 삼산체육관 | | 1.1 | 55.3 | Incheon | Bupyeong-gu |
| 758 | Gulpocheon | 굴포천 | | 0.9 | 56.2 | Incheon | Bupyeong-gu |
| 759 | Bupyeong-gu Office (Serim General Hospital) | 부평구청 (세림병원) | Incheon Subway Line 1 | 0.9 | 57.1 | Incheon | Bupyeong-gu |
| 760 | Sangok | 산곡 | | 1.6 | 58.7 | Incheon | Bupyeong-gu |
| 761 | Seongnam (Geobuk Market) | 석남 (거북시장) | Incheon Subway Line 2 | 2.3 | 61.0 | Incheon | Seohae-gu |
| 762 | Dokgolsageori (2030) | 독골사거리 | | --- | --- | Incheon | Seohae-gu |
| 763 | Gahyeon (2030) | 가현 | | --- | --- | Incheon | Seohae-gu |
| 764 | Simgokcheon (2030) | 심곡천 | | --- | --- | Incheon | Seohae-gu |
| 765 | Canal Way (2030) | 커낼웨이 | | --- | --- | Incheon | Seohae-gu |
| 766 | Cheongna City Tower (2030) | 청라시티타워 | | --- | --- | Incheon | Seohae-gu |
| 767 | Cheongna Int'l Business Complex (2030) | 청라국제업무단지 | | --- | --- | Incheon | Seohae-gu |
| 768 | Jeongseojin (2033) | 정서진 | | --- | --- | Incheon | Seohae-gu |
| 769 | Cheongna Int'l City (2033) | 청라국제도시 | AREX | --- | --- | Incheon | Seohae-gu |

== Rolling stock ==
=== Current ===
==== Seoul Metro ====
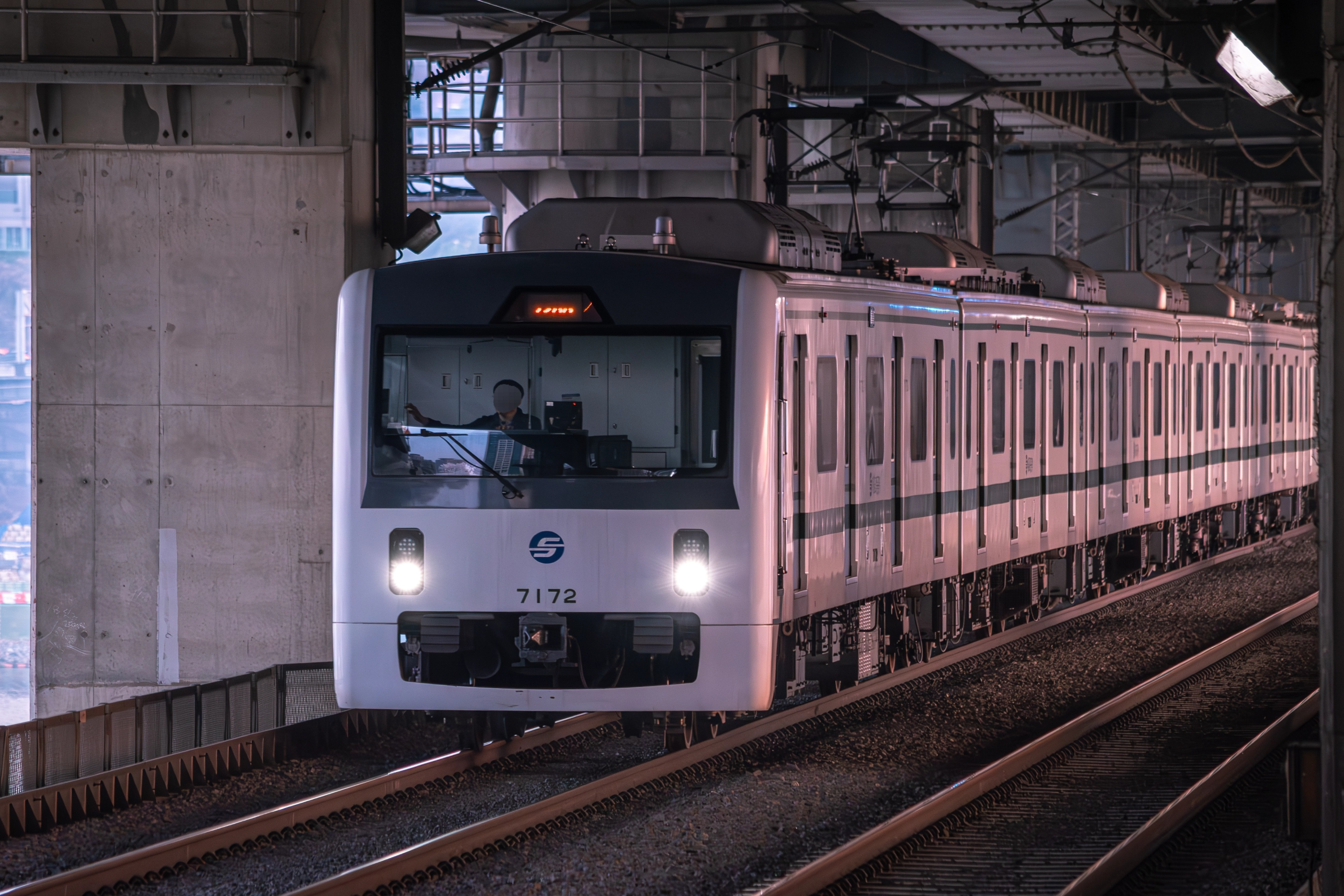
7000 series (4th generation) crossing the Cheongdam Bridge in April 2026.

- Seoul Metro 7000 series
  - 1st generation – since 1996 ,17 train(Retirement in Progress)
  - 2nd generation – since 1999 ,46 train
  - 3rd generation – since 2012 ,7 train
  - 4th generation – since 2022 ,2 train
  - 5th generation – since 2022 (1st generation replacement),17 train

== In popular culture ==
Jayang station (and the whole line) appeared in the 2025 Netflix animated musical film KPop Demon Hunters during one of the battle scenes between Rumi, Mira & Zoey (the main protagonists of the film) and the Demons. The station and the whole line also appeared in several Korean/American media.

== Ridership ==
Seoul Subway Line 7 Ridership (Note: The ridership is calculated based on boarding and transferring passengers (a+c). The data tallies between the two sources but the Seoul Metro source is more granular. The ridership data is derived from the 서울교통공사 수송실적 (Seoul Metro transport performance) data/report.)
| Year | Ridership | Change (%) | Remarks |
|---|---|---|---|
| 2026 | 160,464,395 | - | Updated as of June 2026 |
| 2025 | 312,348,689 | ▲0.1 | |
| 2024 | 312,062,946 | ▲1.2 | |
| 2023 | 308,470,000 | ▲6.9 | |
| 2022 | 288,601,000 | ▼2.5 | |
| 2021 | 295,930,000 | ▲2.1 | Expansion to Seongnam begins operation |
| 2020 | 289,974,000 | ▼23.7 | COVID-19 pandemic |
| 2019 | 380,143,000 | ▲1.0 | |
| 2018 | 376,260,000 | ▲0.1 | |
| 2017 | 375,777,000 | ▼1.2 | |
| 2016 | 380,425,000 | ▲1.6 | Highest on record |
| 2015 | 374,340,000 | ▼1.0 | |
| 2014 | 378,302,000 | ▲1.8 | |
| 2013 | 371,657,000 | ▲9.9 | |
| 2012 | 338,107,000 | ▲2.8 | Expansion to Bupyeong-gu Office begins operation |
| 2011 | 328,845,000 | ▲4.2 | |
| 2010 | 315,541,000 | ▲4.2 | |
| 2009 | 302,715,000 | ▼0.1 | |
| 2008 | 302,946,000 | ▲1.6 | |
| 2007 | 298,282,000 | ▲0.1 | |
| 2006 | 297,896,000 | ▲0.1 | |
| 2005 | 297,654,000 | ▲0.3 | |
| 2004 | 296,624,000 | ▲3.0 | |
| 2003 | 287,938,000 | ▲3.9 | |
| 2002 | 277,055,000 | ▲7.9 | |
| 2001 | 256,696,000 | ▲140.2 | |
| 2000 | 106,869,000 | ▲27.2 | Onsu to Koknuk Univ. opens for service in two phases |
| 1999 | 84,002,000 | ▲56.0 | |
| 1998 | 53,838,000 | ▼7.5 | |
| 1997 | 58,215,000 | - | Line begins service |

== See also ==
- Subways in South Korea
- Seoul Metropolitan Rapid Transit Corporation
- Seoul Metropolitan Subway
