= Sadang station =

Train station in South Korea

Coordinates: 37°28′35.4″N 126°58′53.8″E

사당; Sadang
사당; Sadang
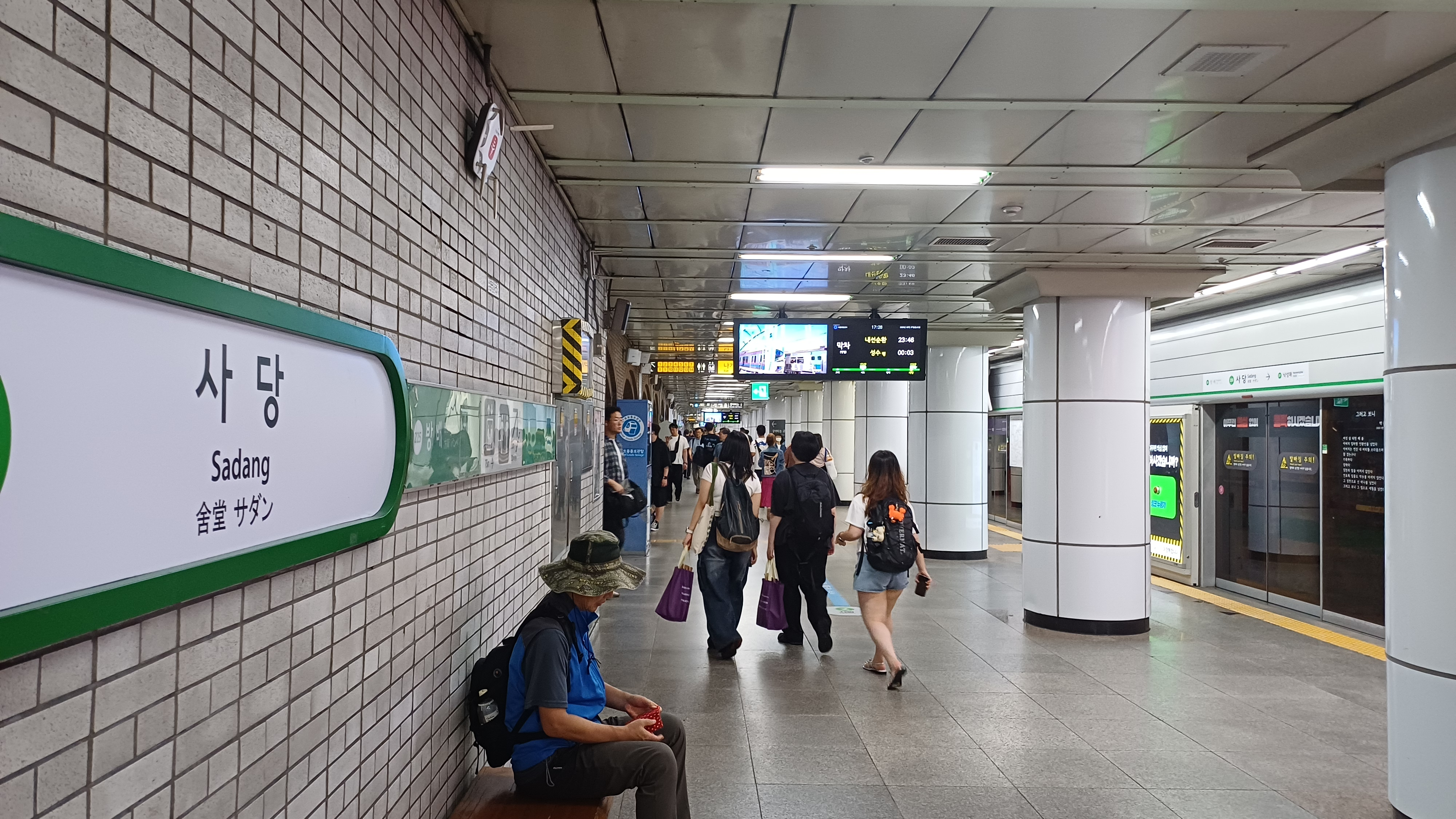
- Station Platform (Line 2)

Korean name
- Hangul: 사당역
- Hanja: 舍堂驛
- RR: Sadang-yeok
- MR: Sadang-yŏk

General information
- Location: 1129 Sadang-dong, 2089 Nambusunhwanno Jiha, Dongjak-gu, Seoul, South Korea
- Operator: Seoul Metro
- Lines: Line 2 Line 4
- Platforms: 3
- Tracks: 4

Construction
- Structure type: Underground

Key dates
- December 17, 1983: Line 2 opened
- October 18, 1985: Line 4 opened

Passengers
- (Daily) Based on Jan-Dec of 2012. Line 2: 94,735; Line 4: 58,545
Services
Preceding station	Seoul Metropolitan Subway	Following station
Bangbae Next counterclockwise	Line 2	Nakseongdae Next clockwise
Chongshin University towards Jinjeop	Line 4	Namtaeryeong towards Oido
Location

Sadang Station is a station on the Seoul Subway Line 2 and Seoul Subway Line 4 in South Korea.

Sadang Station has one island platform for Line 4 and two side platforms for Line 2. The Line 2 platforms of this station were the second in South Korea to have platform screen doors installed, after Yongdu Station and the first to be retrofitted on existing platforms, on October 21, 2005.

Both platform levels are located in Sadang-dong, Dongjak-gu, Seoul.

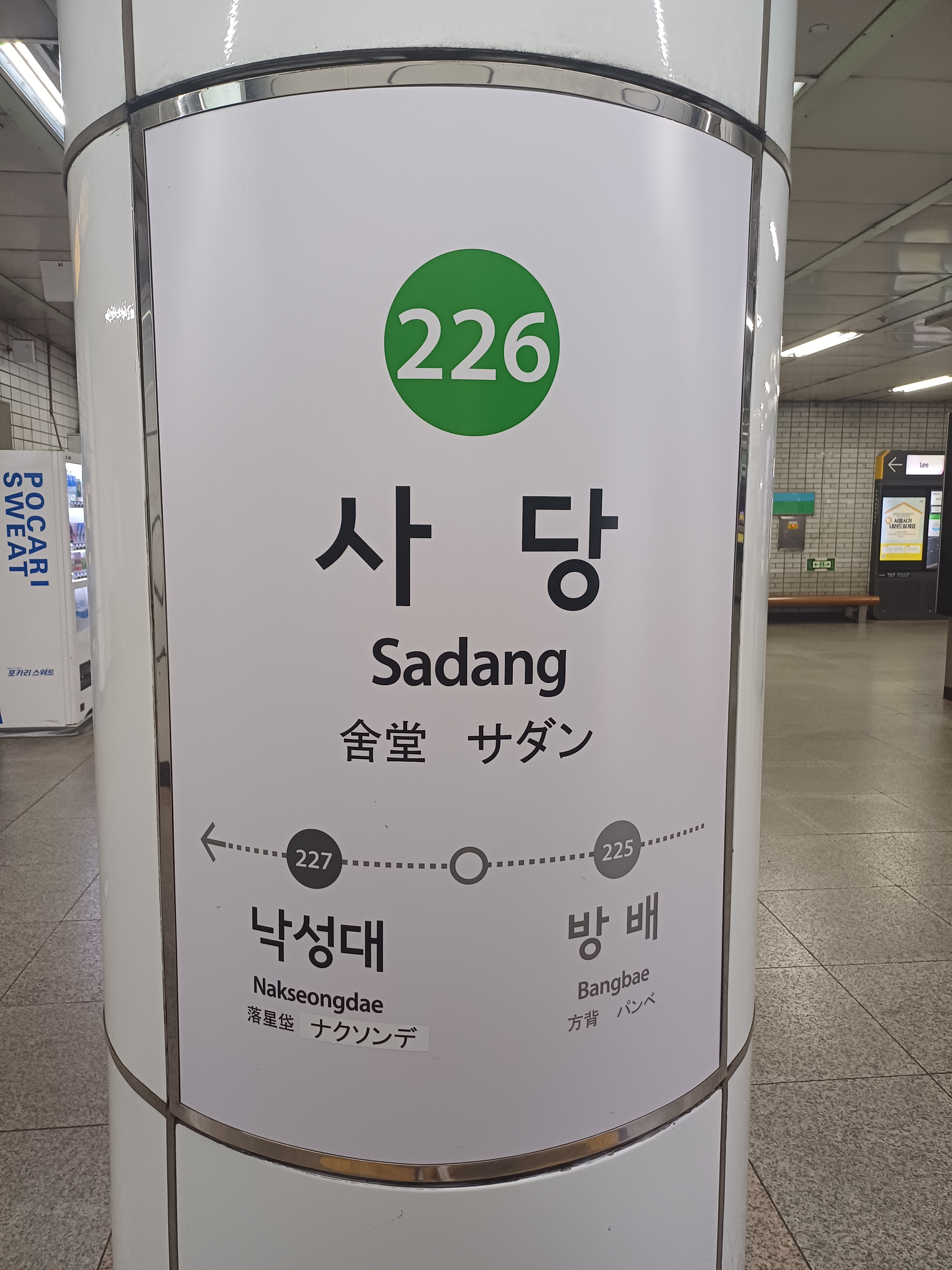
Line 2 alternative station sign

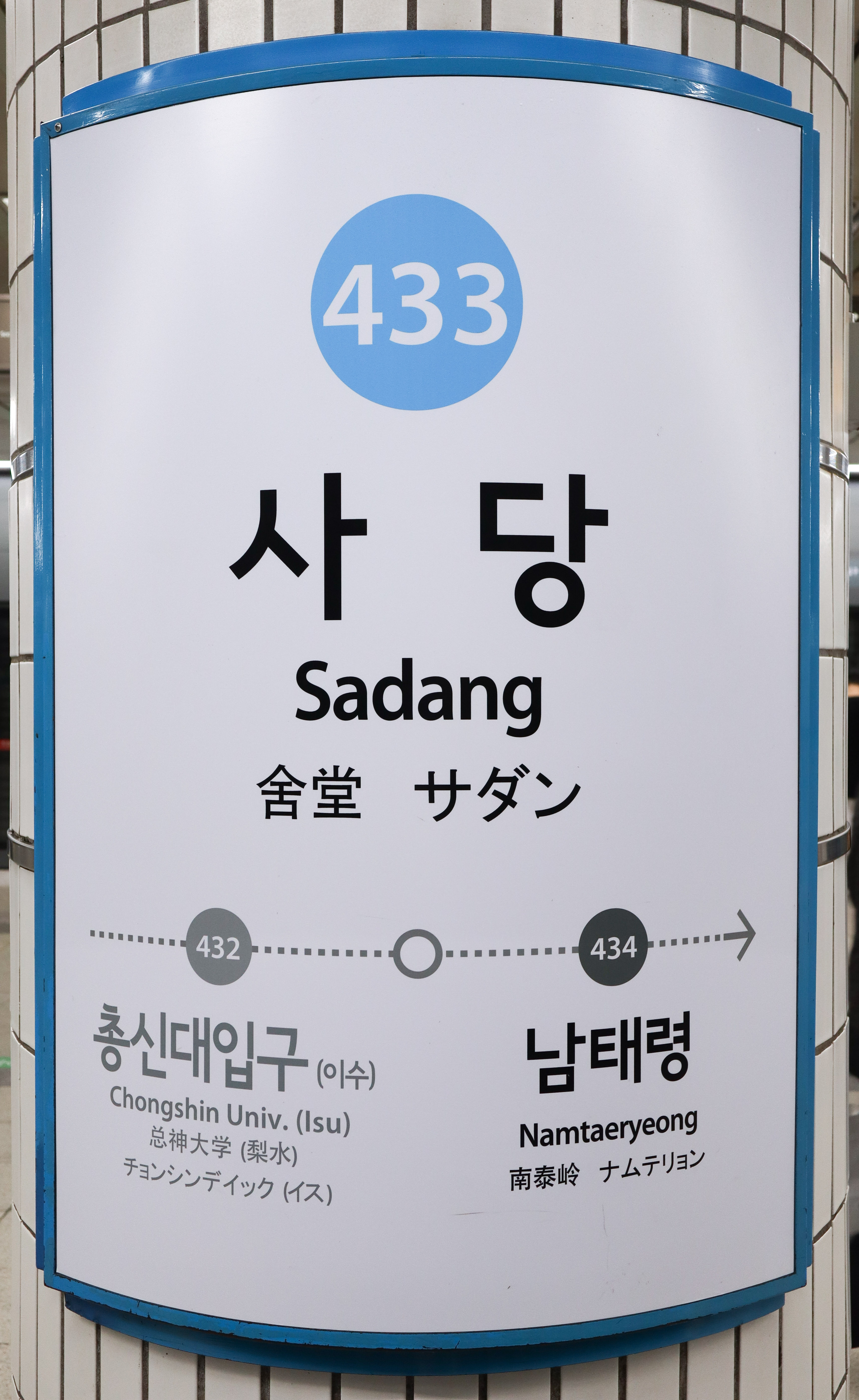
Line 4 station sign

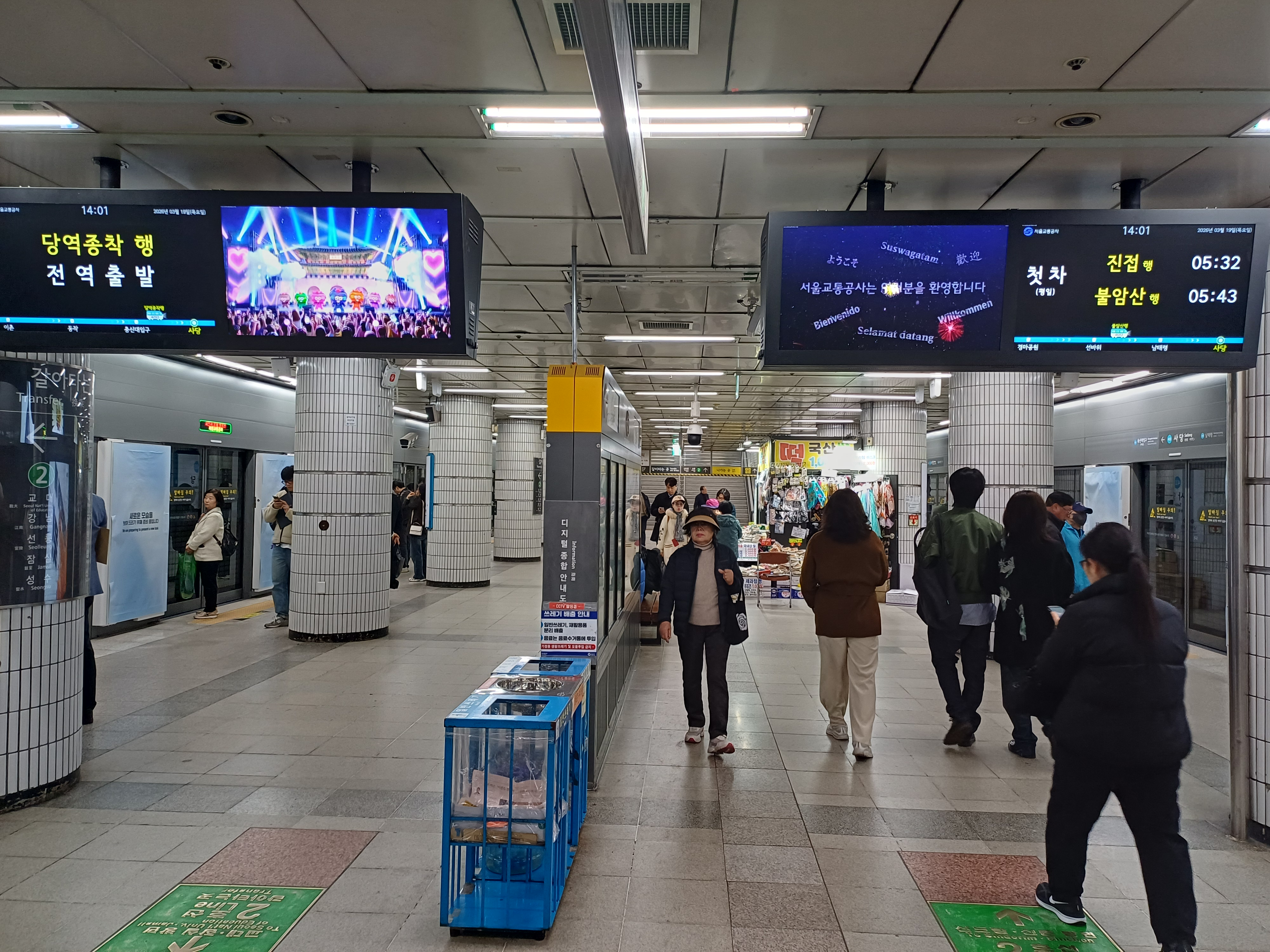
Station platform (Line 4)

== Station layout ==
G	Street level	Exit

L1; Concourse	Lobby	Customer Service, Shops, Vending machines, ATMs

L2; Line 2 platforms	Side platform, doors will open on the right
L2; Line 2 platforms	Inner circle	← Line 2 Next clockwise (Nakseongdae)
L2; Line 2 platforms	Outer circle	Line 2 Next counterclockwise (Bangbae) →
L2; Line 2 platforms	Side platform, doors will open on the right

L3; Line 4 platforms	Northbound	← Line 4 toward Jinjeop (Chongshin Univ.)
L3; Line 4 platforms	Island platform, doors will open on the left
L3; Line 4 platforms	Southbound	Line 4 toward Oido (Namtaeryeong) →

== Passenger load ==
In a survey conducted in 2011 by the Ministry of Land, Transport and Maritime Affairs on 92 administrative divisions across the country, it reported that Sadang Station is the third-busiest public transit stop following Gangnam Station and Jamsil Station. It is followed by Seolleung Station and Sillim Station.

In December 2010 the station is recorded as having the second-highest WiFi data consumption of all the Seoul Metropolitan Subway stations, following Express Bus Terminal Station and followed by Dongdaemun Station, Jamsil Station and Jongno 3(sam)-ga Station.
