= Sangdo-dong =

Neighborhood in Seoul, South Korea

- Country: South Korea

Area
  - Total: 3.83 km^{2} (1.48 sq mi)

Population (2001)
  - Total: 112,254
  - Density: 29,309/km^{2} (75,910/sq mi)

Korean name
- Hangul: 상도동
- Hanja: 上道洞
- RR: Sangdo-dong
- MR: Sangdo-dong

Sangdo-dong (Korean: 상도동) is a dong (neighbourhood) of Dongjak District, Seoul, South Korea.

== See also ==
- Administrative divisions of South Korea
