= Sadang-dong =

Neighborhood in Seoul, South Korea

Coordinates: 37°53′N 128°49′E

- Interactive map of Sadang-dong
- Country: South Korea

Area
  - Total: 2.93 km^{2} (1.13 sq mi)

Population (2001)
  - Total: 99,322
  - Density: 33,898/km^{2} (87,800/sq mi)

Korean name
- Hangul: 사당동
- Hanja: 舍堂洞
- RR: Sadang-dong
- MR: Sadang-dong

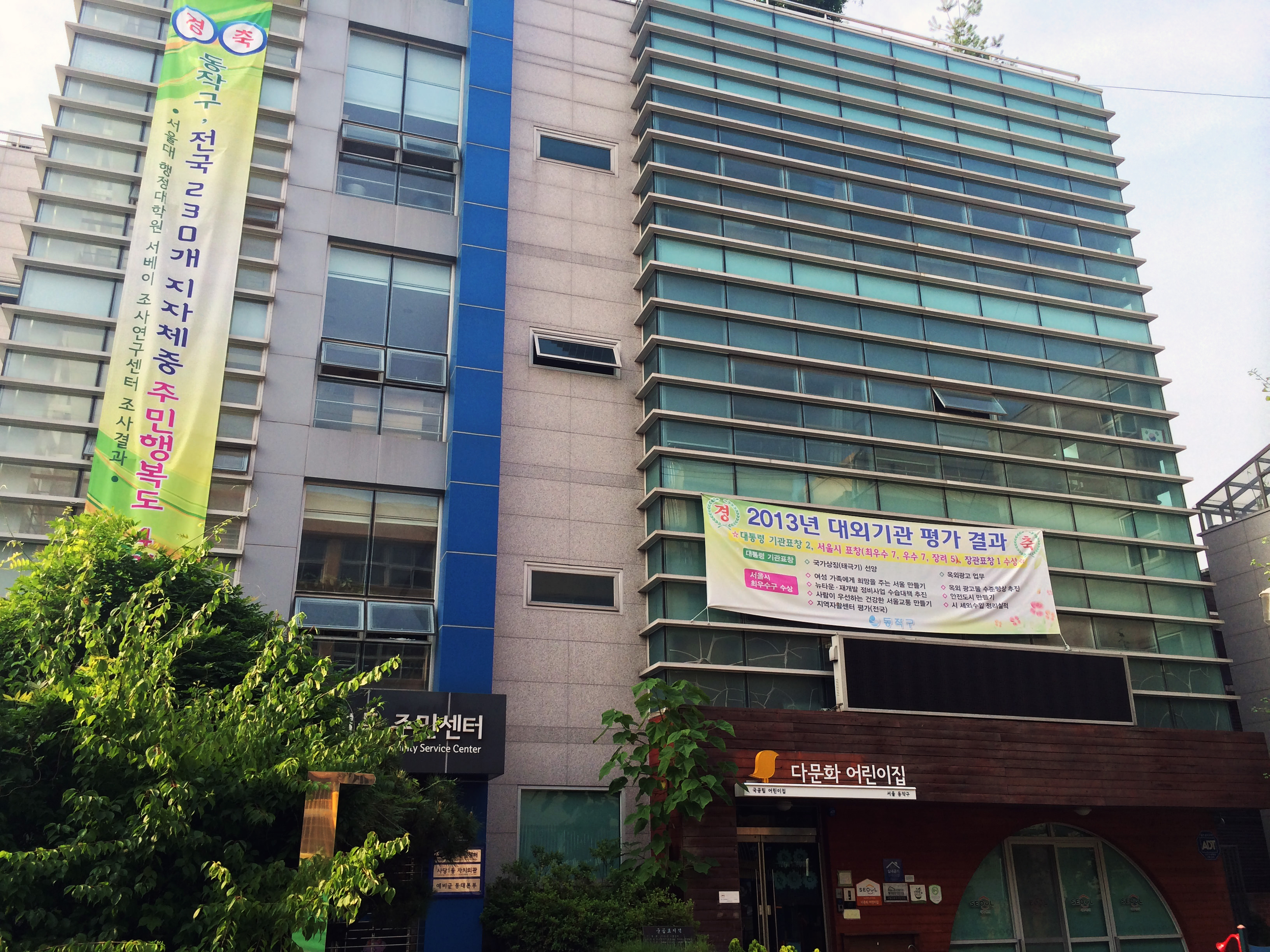
Sadang-dong community service center

Sadang-dong (Korean: 사당동) is a dong (neighborhood) of Dongjak District, Seoul, South Korea.

In a survey conducted in 2011 by the Ministry of Land, Transport and Maritime Affairs on 92 Administrative divisions across the country, it reported that the bus stops in Sadang-dong are among the busiest in the country. The name Sadang-dong derives from the fact that there was a shrine in the village. The shrine is like Guolisa Temple for Confucius, the founder of Confucianism, which is the foundation of Joseon philosophy. The location is currently near Isu intersection.

== See also ==
- Administrative divisions of South Korea
