= Seoul Metro =

Subway system in Seoul, South Korea

- Native name: 서울교통공사
- Type: Municipal-owned corporation
- Industry: Rapid transit
- Predecessors: Seoul Metro Corporation; Seoul Metropolitan Rapid Transit Corporation
- Founded: 31 May 2017
- Headquarters: 346 Cheonho-daero, Seongdong District, Seoul, South Korea
- Key people: Baek Ho (CEO)
- Products: Subway
- Revenue: ₩2,068,192,612,476 (2024)
- Operating income: ₩-945,491,719,492 (2024)
- Net income: ₩-724,126,845,664 (2024)
- Total assets: ₩15,803,593,217,810 (2024)
- Total equity: ₩8,456,269,605,553 (2024)
- Owner: Seoul Metropolitan Government
- Number of employees: 16,577 (2022)
- Website: www.seoulmetro.co.kr/en/index.do?device=PC

- Seoul Metro
- Hangul: 서울교통공사
- Hanja: 서울交通公社
- RR: Seoul gyotong gongsa
- MR: Sŏul kyot'ong kongsa

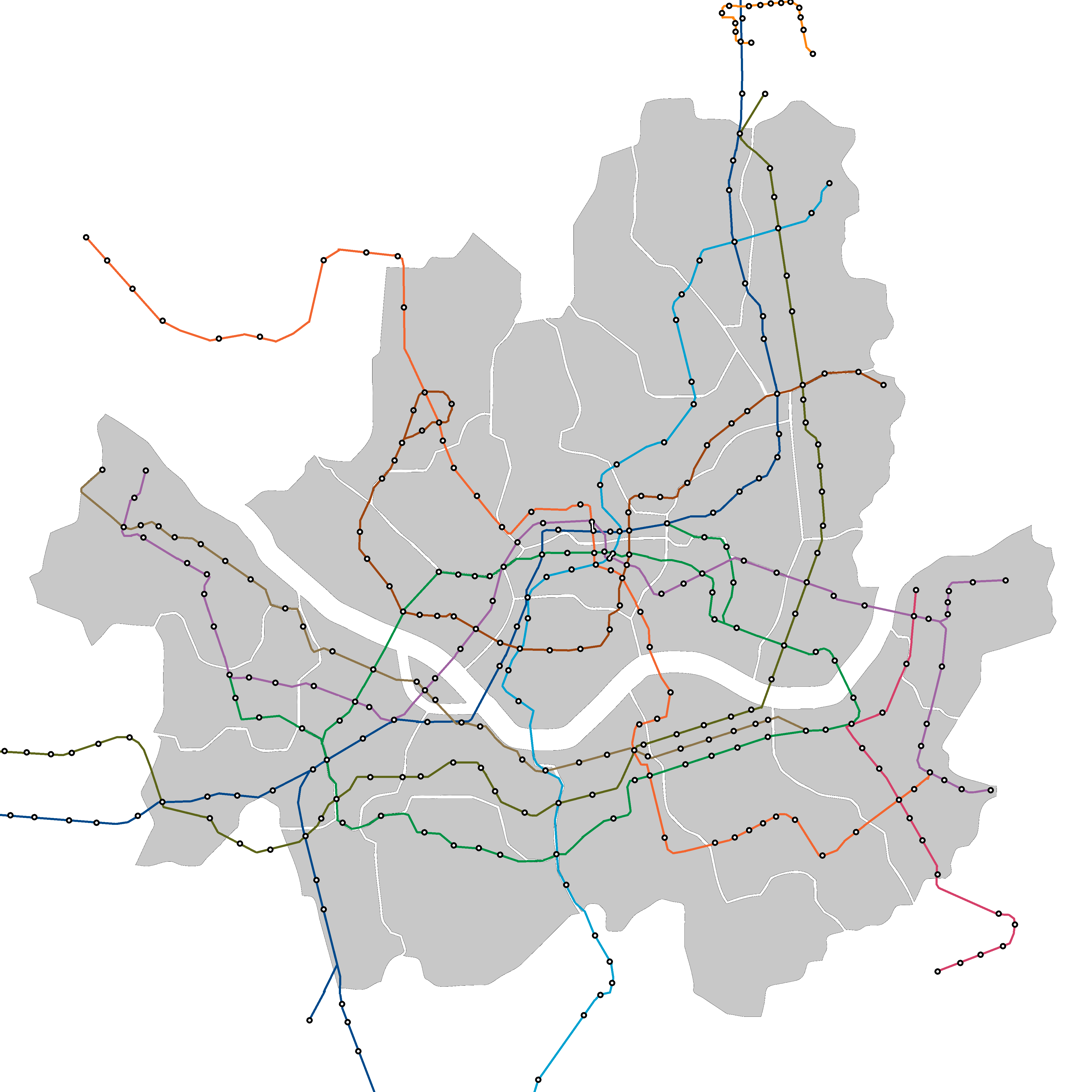

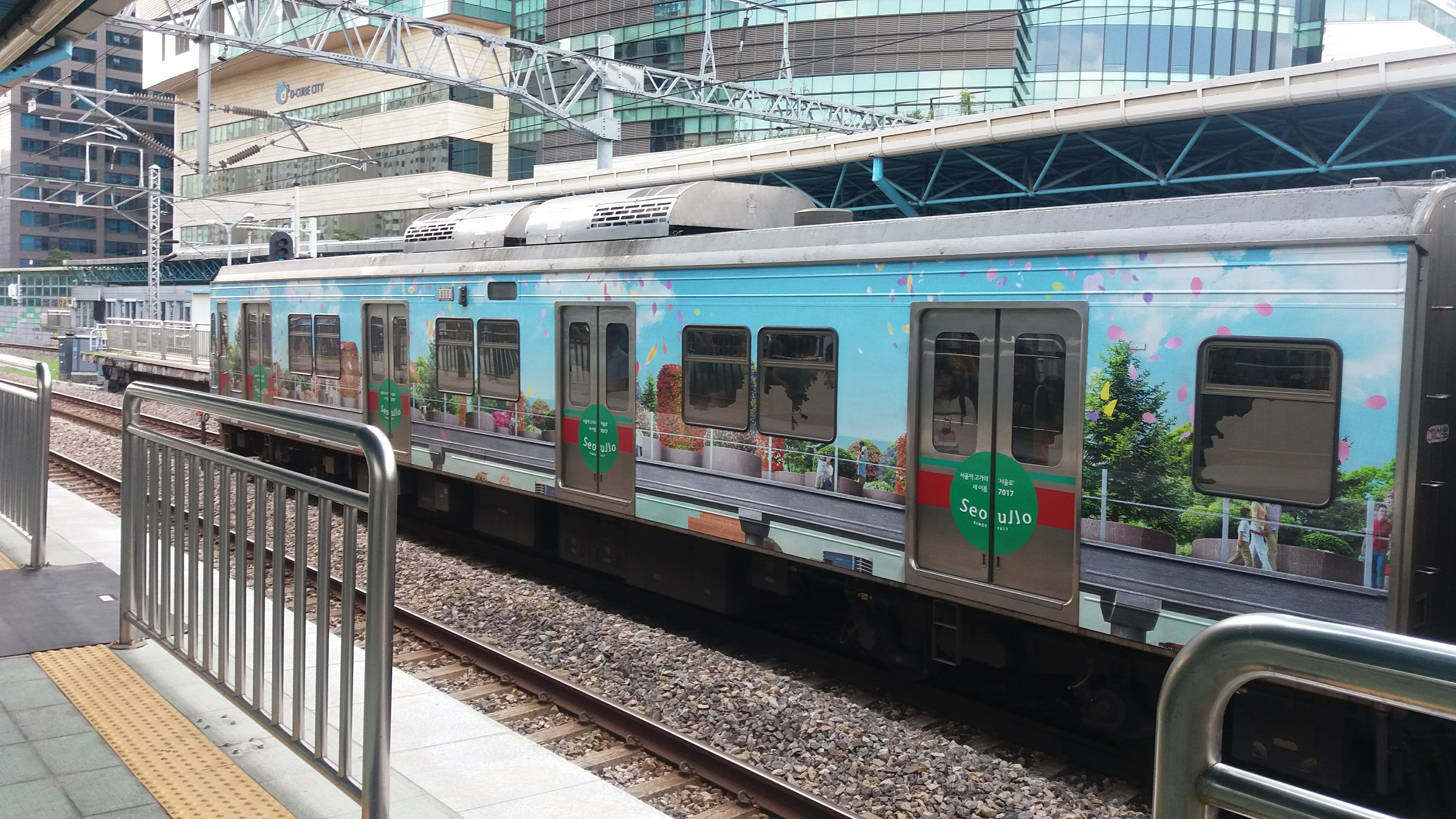
Seoullo Painting in Seoul Metro 1001 Train

Seoul Transportation Corporation, branded as Seoul Metro (Korean: 서울교통공사), is a municipal-owned corporation owned by Seoul Metropolitan Government, and one of the two major operators of Seoul Metropolitan Subway with Korail.

== History ==
On May 31, 2017, Seoul Transportation Corporation was formed after a merger of Seoul Metro Corporation and Seoul Metropolitan Rapid Transit Corporation to more efficiently operate services on lines 1–9.

== Management・Performance ==
In South Korea, seniors aged 65 and over can ride the subway for free. However, due to this initiative, the Seoul Metro's deficit is getting worse.

A declining birthrate and aging population are expected to further worsen public finances, and there is even talk of raising the age limit for free passes.

Seoul Metro, the operator of the subway system in Seoul, has suffered a net loss of around 1 trillion won annually since 2020, with an accumulated net loss of 14 trillion won. A similar problem is occurring at the Korea Railroad Corporation.

== Lines and sections ==
Seoul Metro's service covers part of lines 1, 3, 4 and all of lines 2, 5, 6, 7, 8 & 9. Trains from Lines 1, 3 and 4 through operate with Korail services. Seoul Metro controls the railways and stations owned by the Seoul Metropolitan Government.

Line Name	Starting Station(s)	Ending Station(s)	Stations	Total Length in km
(control)	Cheongnyangni	Seoul Station	10	7.8 km
(service)	Yeoncheon / Uijeongbu / Kwangwoon University / Yeongdeungpo	Incheon / Seodongtan / Gwangmyeong / Sinchang	97	200.6 km
Seoul Subway Line 2	City Hall / Sindorim / Seongsu	Kkachisan / Sinseol-dong / City Hall	51	60.2 km
(control)	Jichuk	Ogeum	34	38.2 km
(service)	Daehwa	Ogeum	44	57.4 km
(control)	Buramsan	Namtaeryeong	26	31.7 km
(service)	Jinjeop / Buramsan	Sadang / Oido	51	72.1 km
Seoul Subway Line 5	Banghwa	Hanam Geomdansan / Macheon	57	63.0 km
Seoul Subway Line 6	Eungam	Sinnae	39	36.4 km
(control)	Jangam	Onsu	41	46.9 km
(service)	Jangam	Seongnam	53	60.1 km
(control)	Amsa History Park	Moran	19	18.8 km
(service)	Byeollae	Moran	25	30.1 km
(control)	Eonju	VHS Medical Center	12	12.8 km
(service)	Gaehwa / Gimpo International Airport	VHS Medical Center	38	40.6 km

== Depots ==
- Gunja Depot - for Lines 1 & 2
- Sinjeong Depot - for Line 2
- Jichuk Depot - for Line 3 (heavy maintenance for Line 4)
- Suseo Depot - for Line 3
- Chang-dong Depot - for Line 4
- Godeok Depot - for Line 5 (heavy maintenance for Line 8)
- Banghwa Depot - for Line 5
- Sinnae Depot - for Line 6
- Dobong Depot - for Line 7 (heavy maintenance for Line 6)
- Cheonwang Depot - for Line 7
- Moran Depot - for Line 8
- Gimpo Depot - for Line 9

== See also ==
- Korail
- Seoul Metropolitan Rapid Transit Corporation
- List of rapid transit systems
- List of urban rail systems by length
- Seoul Metropolitan Subway stations
- Transportation in South Korea
