= Jangam station =

Metro station in Uijeongbu, South Korea

Coordinates: 37°42′00″N 127°03′11″E

장암; Jangam
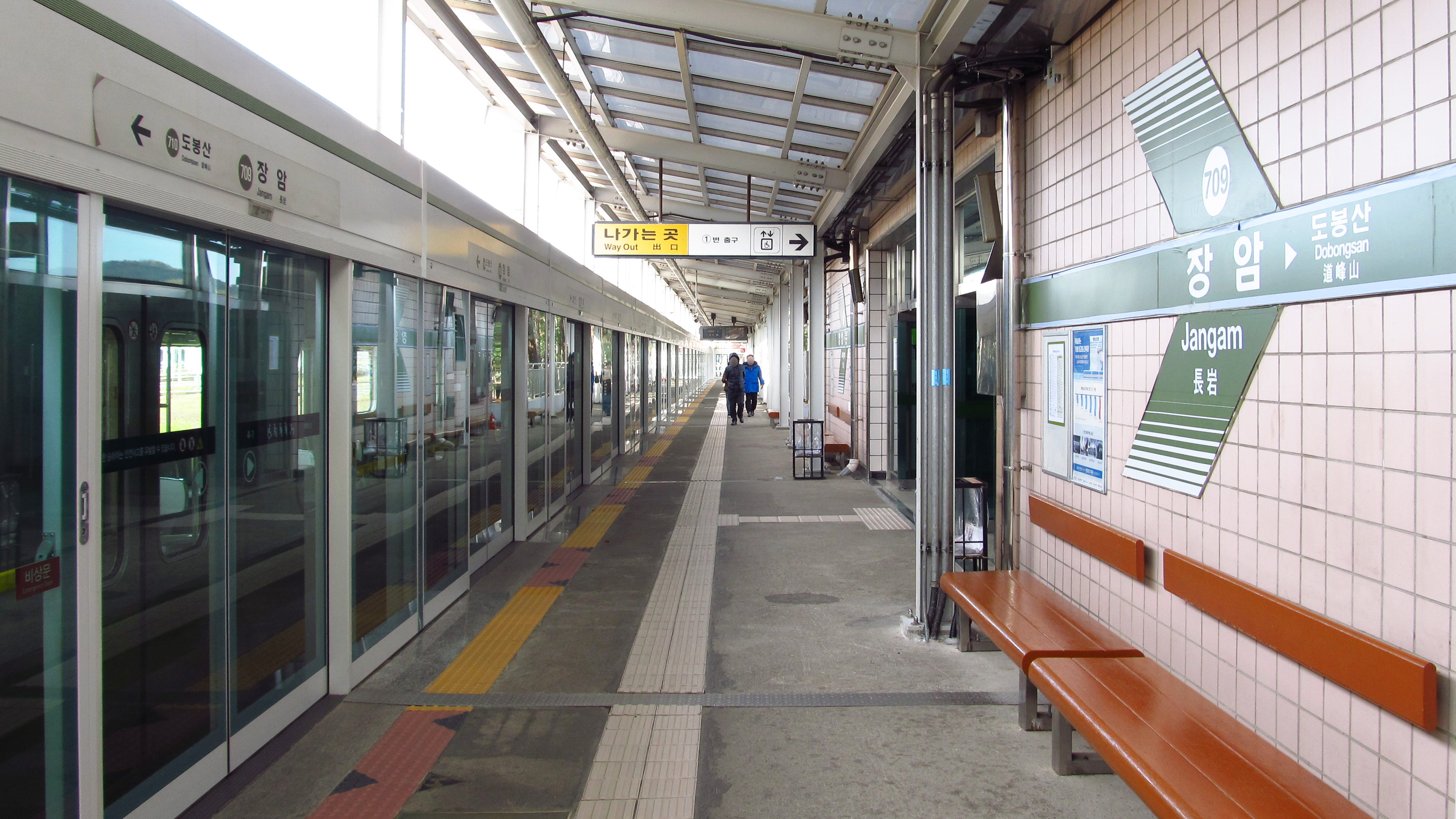
- Station Platform

Korean name
- Hangul: 장암역
- Hanja: 長岩驛
- Revised Romanization: Jangam-yeok
- McCune–Reischauer: Chang'am-yŏk

General information
- Location: 160-8 Jangam-dong, 121 Tongillo, Uijeongbu-si, Gyeonggi-do
- Operated by: Seoul Metro
- Line(s): Line 7
- Platforms: 1
- Tracks: 1

Construction
- Structure type: Aboveground

History
- Opened: October 11, 1996

Services
Preceding station	Seoul Metropolitan Subway	Following station
Terminus	Line 7	Dobongsan towards Seongnam

Jangam Station is the northern terminus of the Seoul Subway Line 7, and is the only station on this line to be located outside the northern precincts of Seoul. This station is located within the train servicing depot, and has the lowest ridership out of all Line 7 stations. Much of the demand for this station comes from people hiking nearby Mt. Surak on weekends.

== Station layout ==
1
↓ Dobongsan

Southbound	← ● Line 7 toward Seongnam
