= Seongnam station (Incheon) =

Metro station in Incheon, South Korea

I213
석남 (거북시장·뉴성민병원)
Seongnam
(Geobuk Market·New Sungmin Hospital)
석남 (거북시장); Seongnam (Geobuk Market)
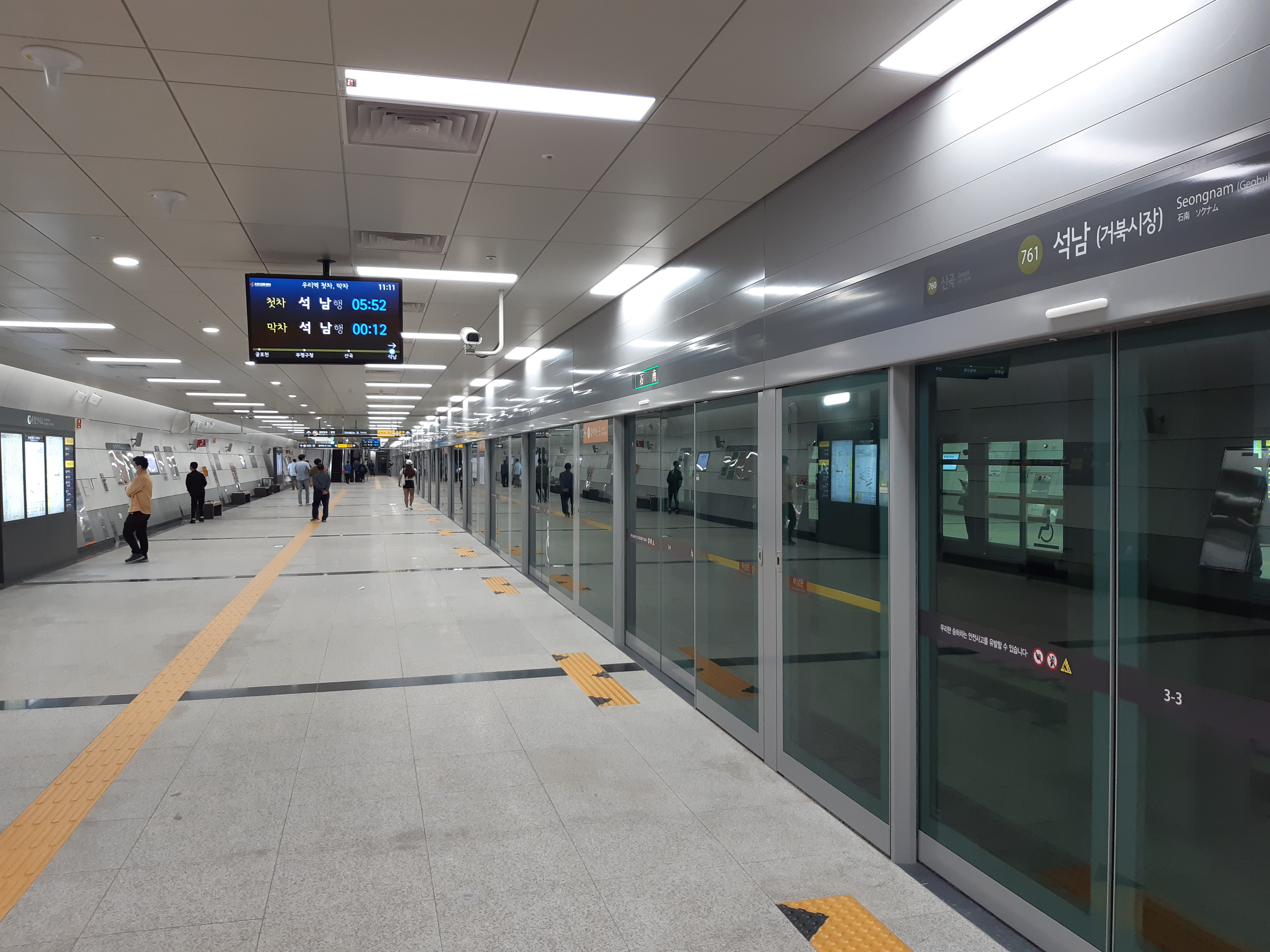
- Line 7 platform

Korean name
- Hangul: 석남역
- Hanja: 石南驛
- RR: Seongnam-yeok
- MR: Sŏngnam-yŏk

General information
- Location: 629 Seongnam-dong, Seohae District, Incheon
- Coordinates: 37°30′26″N 126°40′35″E
- Operator: Incheon Transit Corporation
- Lines: Incheon Line 2 Line 7
- Platforms: 2
- Tracks: 2

Key dates
- July 30, 2016: Incheon Line 2 opened
- May 22, 2021: Line 7 opened

Services
Preceding station	Incheon Subway	Following station
Gajeong Jungang Market towards Geomdan Oryu	Incheon Line 2	West Woman's Community Center towards Unyeon
Preceding station	Seoul Metropolitan Subway	Following station
Sangok towards Jangam	Line 7	Terminus
Location

Seongnam Station (석남역) is a subway station on Incheon Subway Line 2 and Seoul Subway Line 7. It first opened as a station on Incheon Subway Line 2 solely in 2016, and Seoul Subway Line 7 opened in May 2021. Despite their identical spelling in the Roman script, the station is not located in the city of Seongnam (성남) southeast of Seoul, as their names in Hangul differ by one letter.

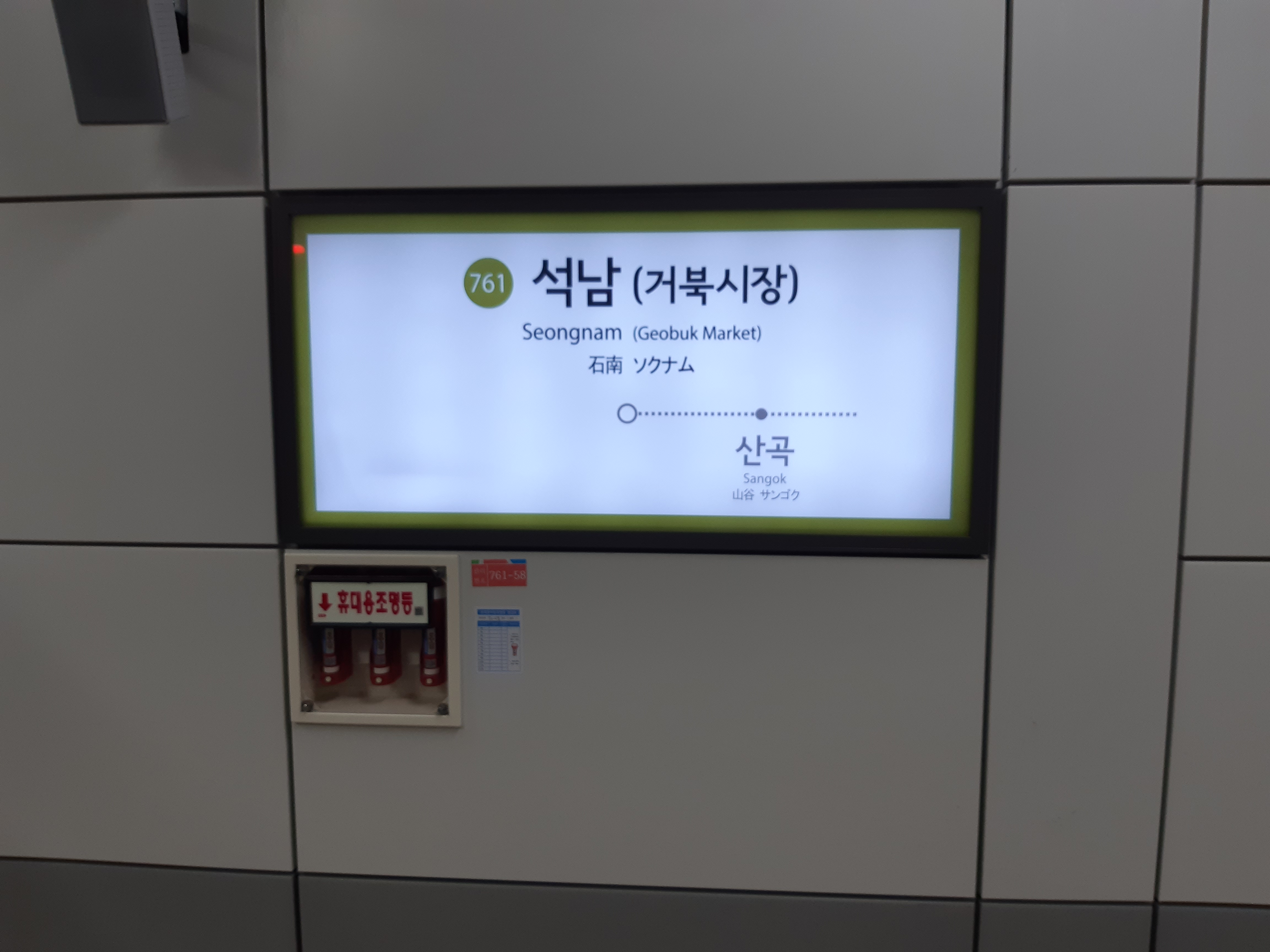
Line 7 station nameplate

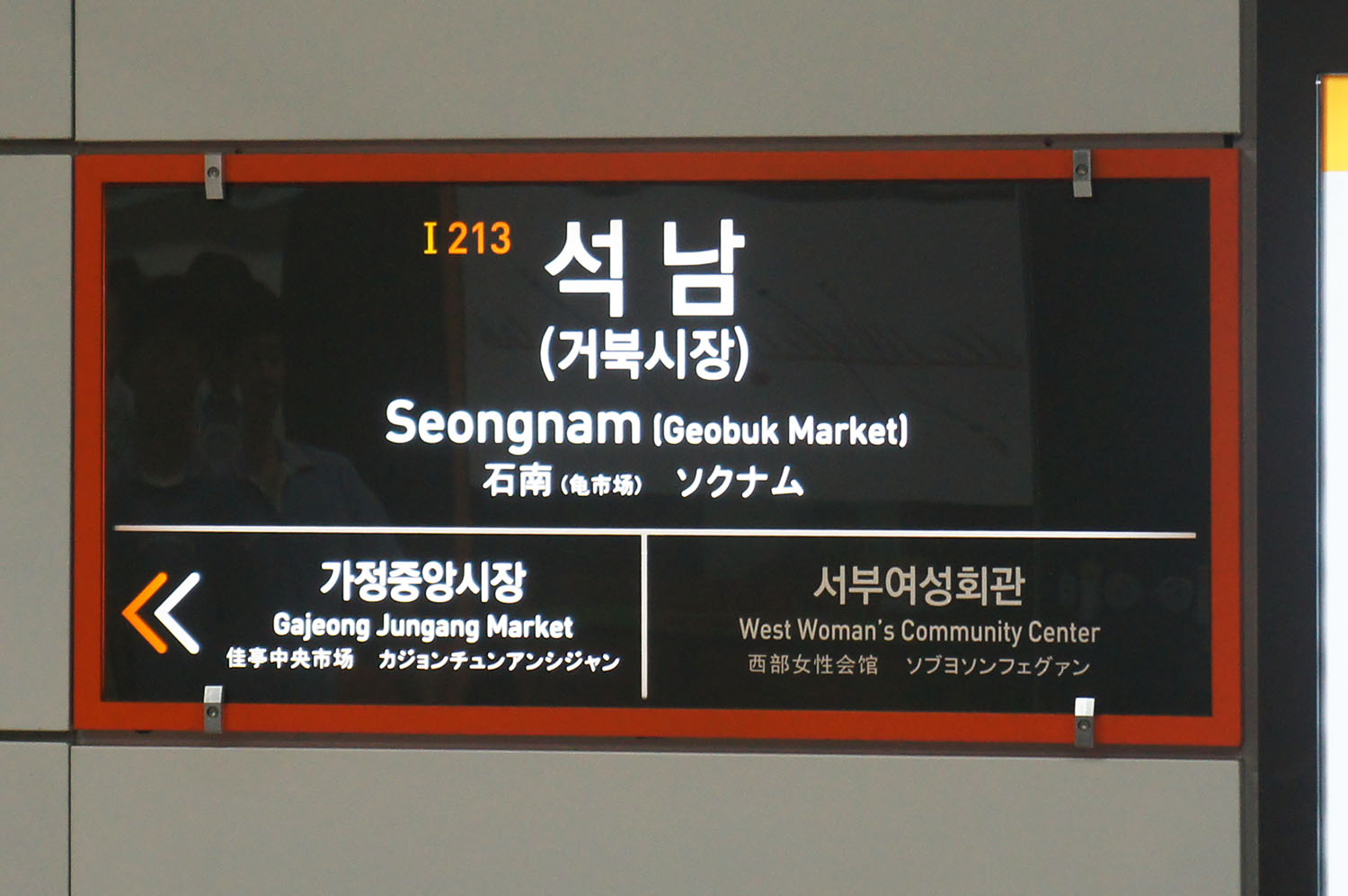
Incheon Line 2 station nameplate
