= Seoul Regional Office of Military Manpower station =

Metro station in Seoul, South Korea

S403 서울지방병무청 Seoul Regional Office of Military Manpower
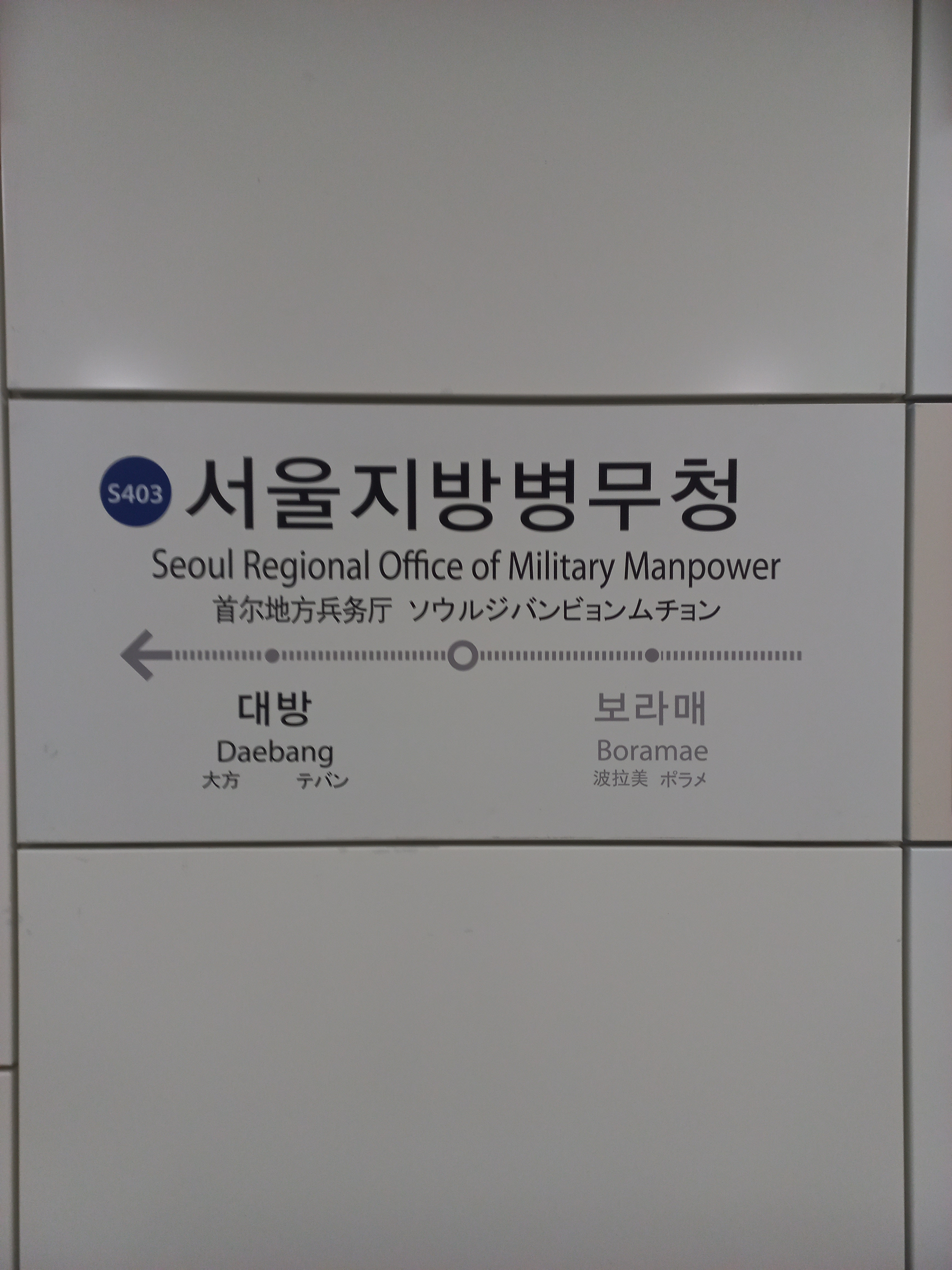

Korean name
- Hangul: 서울지방병무청역
- Hanja: 서울地方兵務廳驛
- Revised Romanization: Seouljibangbyeongmucheong-yeok
- McCune–Reischauer: Sŏulchibangbyŏngmuch'ŏng-yŏk

General information
- Location: 466-41 Daebang-dong, Dongjak-gu, Seoul
- Coordinates: 37.5060°N 126.9227°E
- Operated by: South Seoul LRT Co., Ltd.
- Line: Sillim Line
- Platforms: 2
- Tracks: 2

Construction
- Structure type: Underground

History
- Opened: May 28, 2022
Location

Seoul Regional Office of Military Manpower Station is a station on the Sillim Line. It is located in Daebang-dong, Dongjak-gu, Seoul.

Preceding station	Seoul Metropolitan Subway	Following station
Daebang towards Saetgang	Sillim Line	Boramae towards Gwanaksan
