= Boramae Medical Center station =

Station of the Seoul Metropolitan Subway

S406 보라매병원 (전문건설회관) Boramae Medical Center (Korea Speciality Contractor Center)
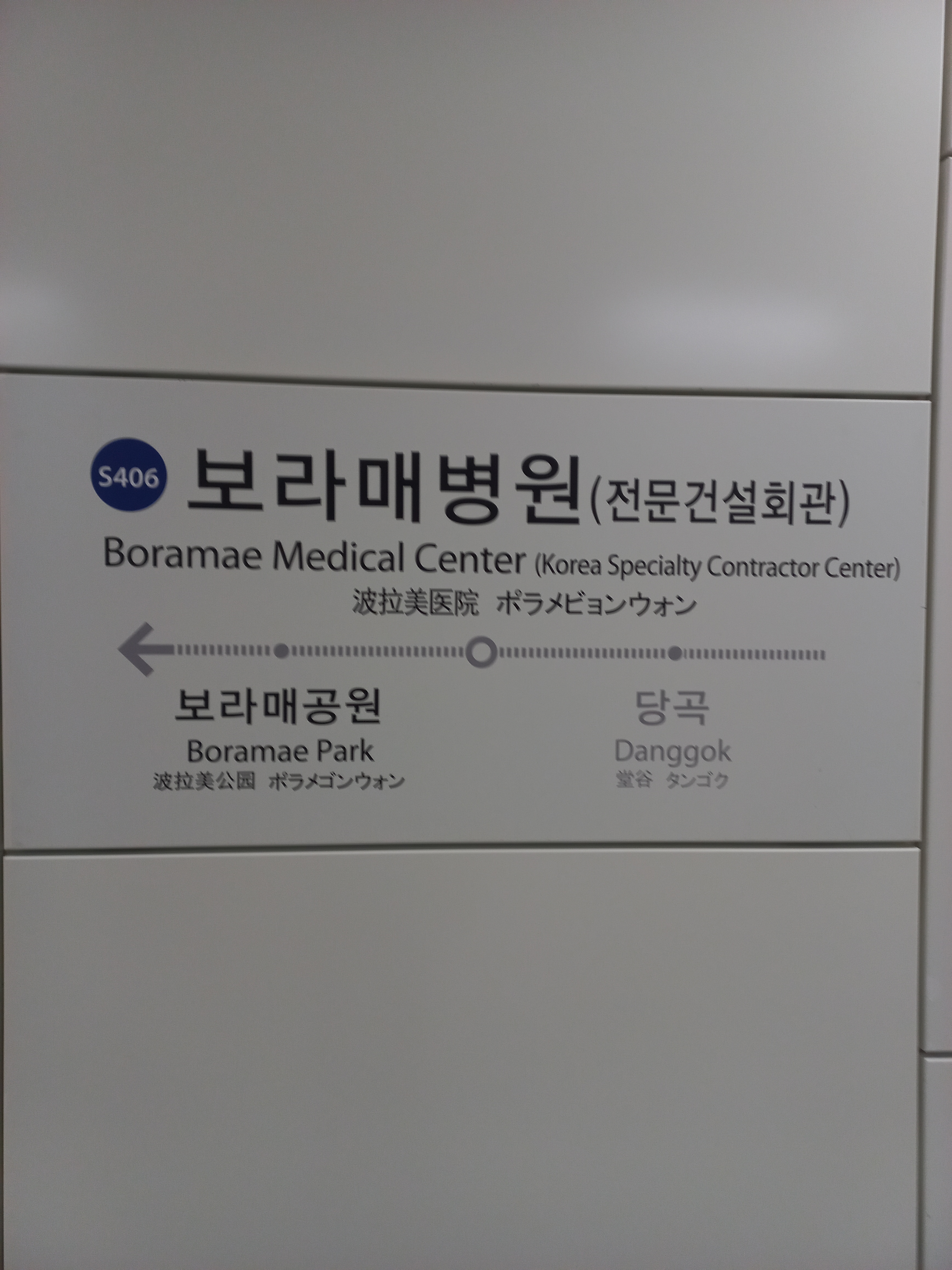

Korean name
- Hangul: 보라매병원역
- Hanja: 보라매病院驛
- Revised Romanization: Boramaebyeongwon-yeok
- McCune–Reischauer: Poramaebyŏngwŏn-yŏk

General information
- Location: 395-61 Sindaebang-dong, Dongjak-gu, Seoul
- Coordinates: 37°29′35″N 126°55′27″E
- Operated by: South Seoul LRT Co., Ltd.
- Line: Sillim Line
- Platforms: 2
- Tracks: 2

Construction
- Structure type: Underground

History
- Opened: May 28, 2022
Location

Boramae Medical Center Station is a station on the Sillim Line. It is located in Sindaebang-dong, Dongjak District, Seoul.

Preceding station	Seoul Metropolitan Subway	Following station
Boramae Park towards Saetgang	Sillim Line	Danggok towards Gwanaksan
