= Boramae Park station =

Station of the Seoul Metropolitan Subway

S405 보라매공원 Boramae Park
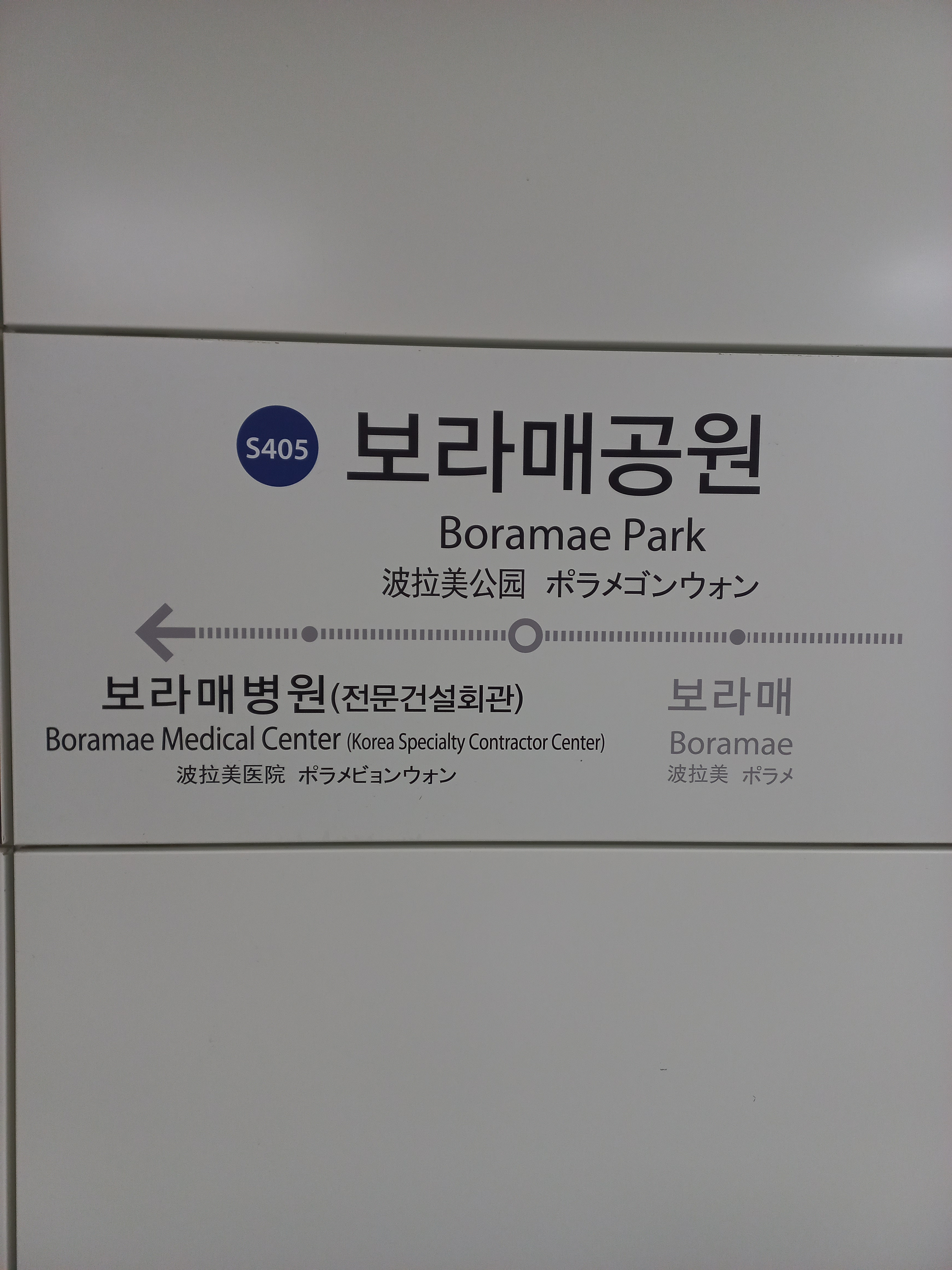

Korean name
- Hangul: 보라매공원역
- Hanja: 보라매公園驛
- Revised Romanization: Boramaegongwon-yeok
- McCune–Reischauer: Poramaegongwŏn-yŏk

General information
- Location: 722 Sindaebang-dong, Dongjak-gu, Seoul
- Coordinates: 37.4954°N 126.9182°E
- Operated by: South Seoul LRT Co., Ltd.
- Line: Sillim Line
- Platforms: 2
- Tracks: 3

Construction
- Structure type: Underground

History
- Opened: May 28, 2022
Location

Boramae Park Station is a station on the Sillim Line. It is located in Sindaebang-dong, Dongjak District, Seoul.

Preceding station	Seoul Metropolitan Subway	Following station
Boramae towards Saetgang	Sillim Line	Boramae Medical Center towards Gwanaksan
