= Daebang station =

Train station in Seoul, South Korea

대방; Daebang
S402
대방 (성애병원)
Daebang
(Sungae Hospital)
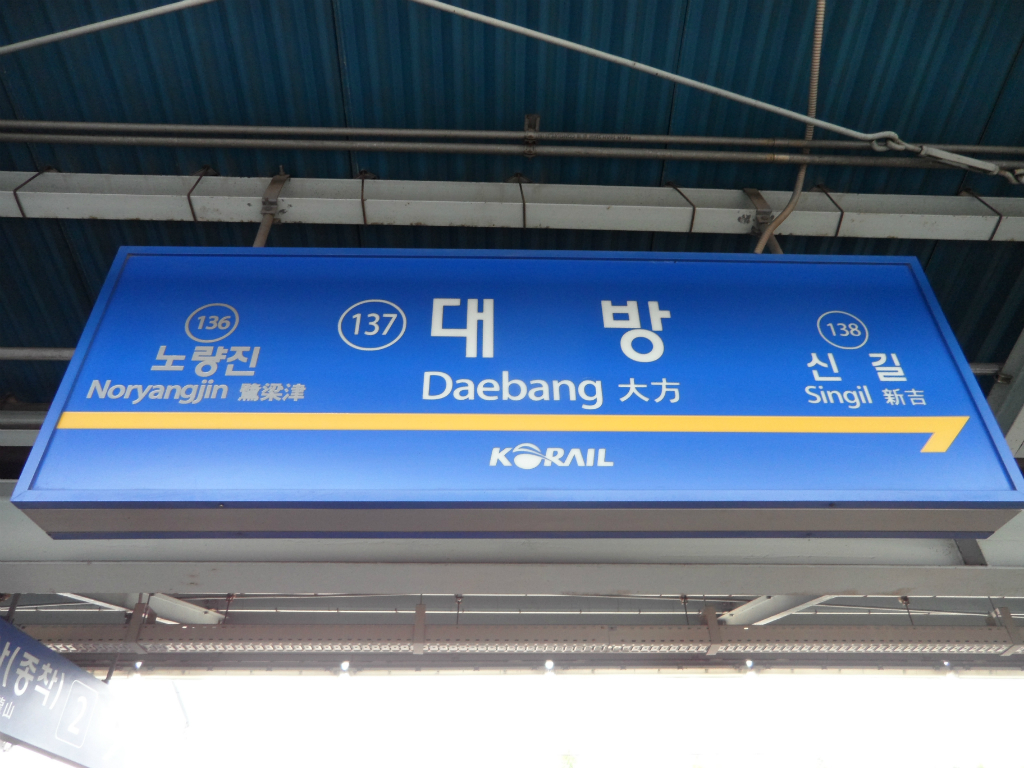

Korean name
- Hangul: 대방역
- Hanja: 大方驛
- RR: Daebang-yeok
- MR: Taebang-yŏk

General information
- Location: 1368-3 Singil 7-dong, 300 Yeouidaebang-ro, Yeongdeungpo-gu, Seoul
- Coordinates: 37°30′48″N 126°55′35″E
- Operator: Korail; South Seoul LRT Co., Ltd.
- Lines: Gyeongbu Line; Sillim Line
- Platforms: 5
- Tracks: 6

Construction
- Structure type: Aboveground (Line 1, Gyeongbu Line) Underground (Sillim Line)

Key dates
- August 15, 1974: Line 1 opened
- May 28, 2022: Sillim Line opened

Passengers
- (Daily) Based on Jan-Dec of 2012. Line 1: 32,897
Services
Preceding station	Seoul Metropolitan Subway	Following station
Noryangjin towards Kwangwoon University or Yeoncheon	Line 1	Singil towards Incheon, Seodongtan or Sinchang
Noryangjin towards Dongducheon	Line 1 Gyeongwon Express	Singil towards Incheon
Noryangjin towards Cheongnyangni	Line 1 Gyeongbu Express	Singil towards Sinchang
Saetgang Terminus	Sillim Line	Seoul Regional Office of Military Manpower towards Gwanaksan
Location

Daebang Station (Korean: 대방역) is a train station in Seoul, South Korea, and is also a stop on the Seoul Subway Line 1 and the Sillim Line. Before the opening of Line 5, this station served as the main link between the Seoul Metropolitan Subway system and Yeouido, a prominent business district in Seoul. Other places of interest in the vicinity of the station include Noryangjin Park and the Seoul Military Manpower Office, although the latter is closer to Boramae Station on Line 7.

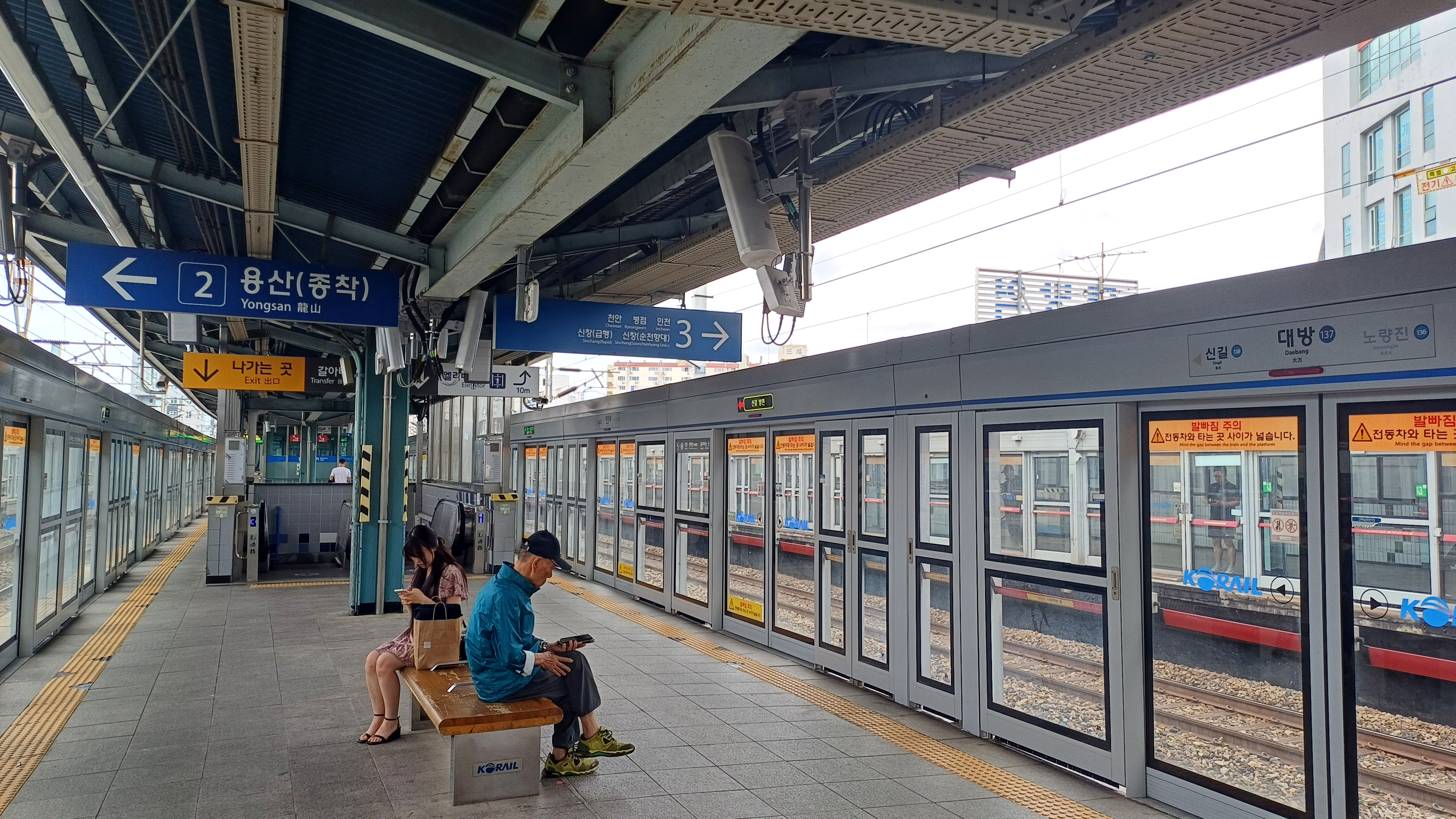
Line 1 platforms

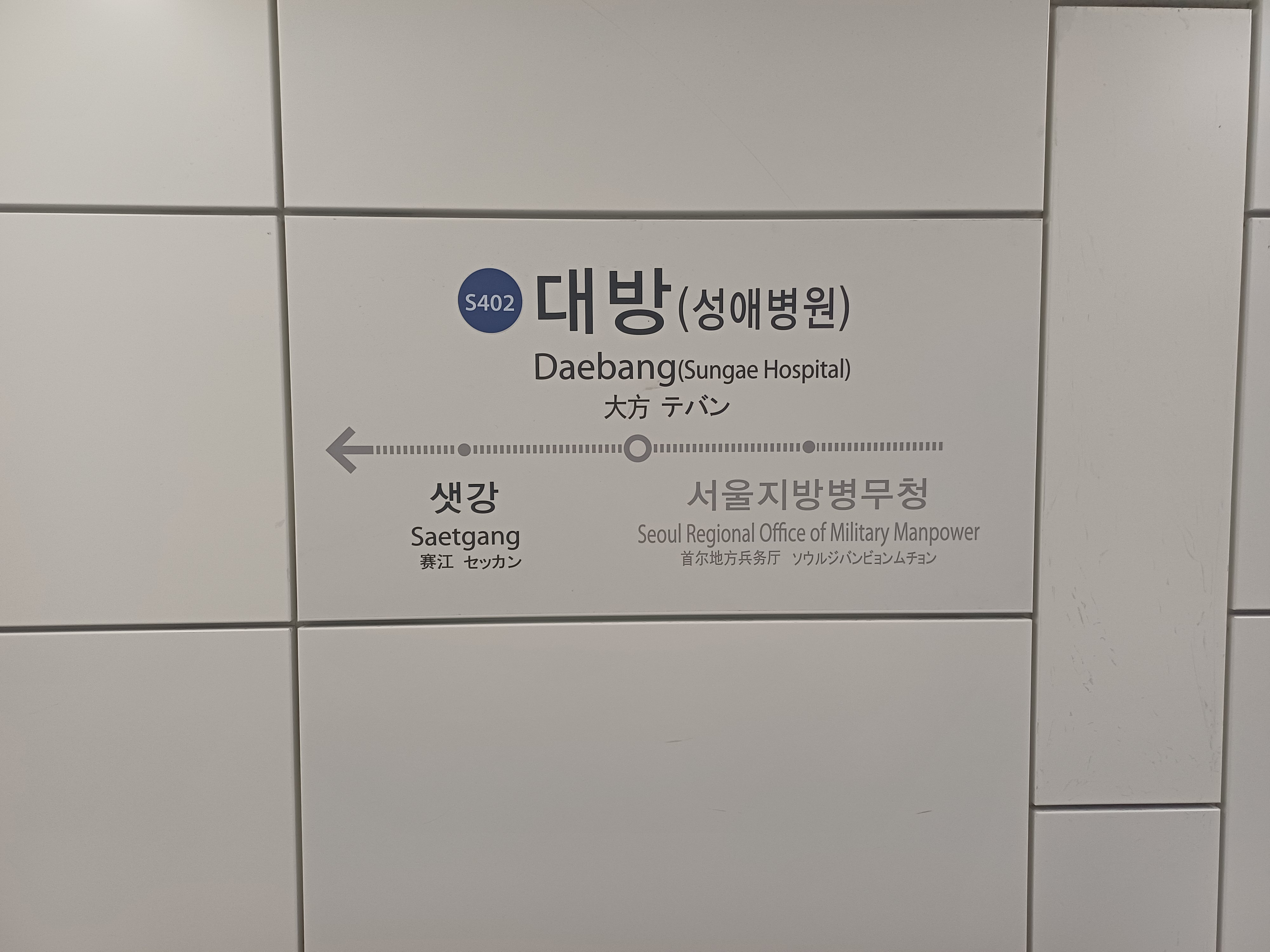
Sillim Line station name sign
