= Danggok station =

Metro station in Seoul, South Korea

S407 당곡 Danggok
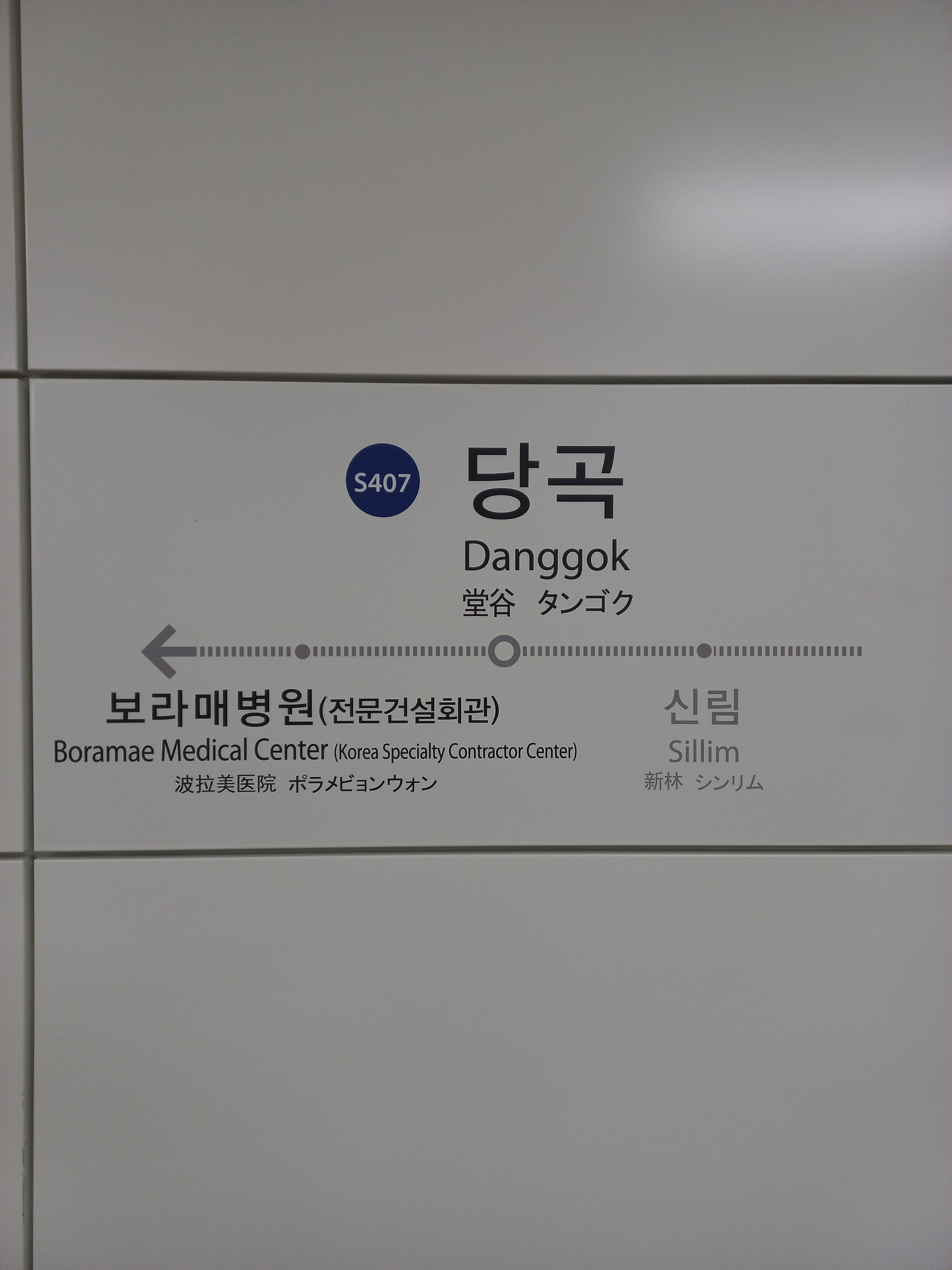

Korean name
- Hangul: 당곡역
- Hanja: 堂谷驛
- RR: Danggok-yeok
- MR: Tanggok-yŏk

General information
- Location: 985 Bongcheon-dong, Gwanak-gu, Seoul
- Coordinates: 37.48931°N 126.92804°E
- Operator: South Seoul LRT Co., Ltd.
- Line: Sillim Line
- Platforms: 2
- Tracks: 2

Construction
- Structure type: Underground

History
- Opened: May 28, 2022
Location

Danggok Station (Korean: 당곡역) is a station on the Sillim Line. It is located in Bongcheon-dong, Gwanak District, Seoul.

Preceding station	Seoul Metropolitan Subway	Following station
Boramae Medical Center towards Saetgang	Sillim Line	Sillim towards Gwanaksan
