= Sillim station =

Metro station in Seoul, South Korea

Coordinates: 37°29′03″N 126°55′47″E

신림; Sillim
S408
신림
Sillim
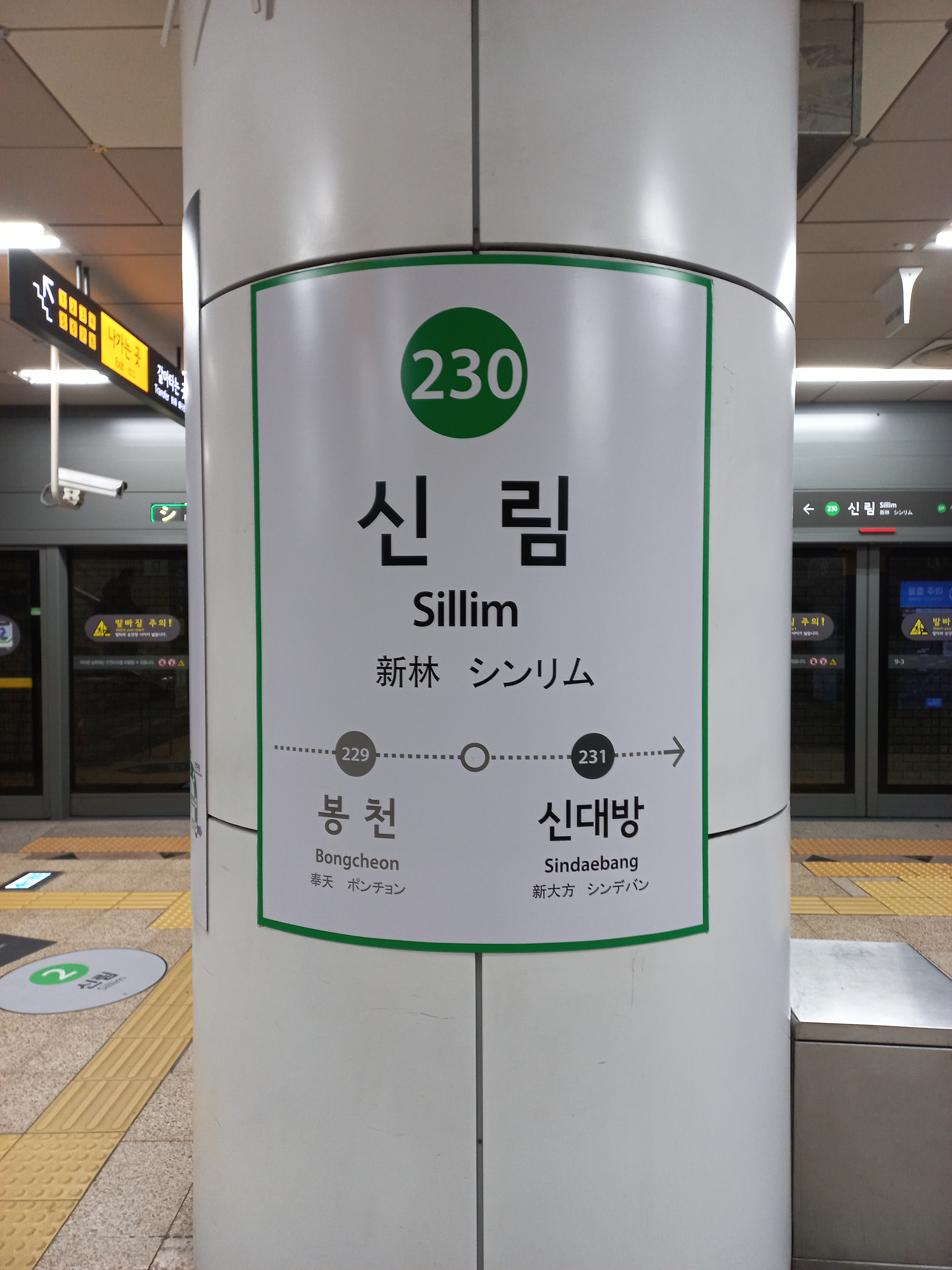
- Line 2 station name platform sign in November 2023

Korean name
- Hangul: 신림역
- Hanja: 新林驛
- Revised Romanization: Sillim-yeok
- McCune–Reischauer: Sillim-yŏk

General information
- Location: 1467-10 Sillim-dong, 1614 Nambusunhwanno Jiha, Gwanak-gu, Seoul
- Operator: Seoul Metro; South Seoul LRT Co., Ltd.
- Lines: Line 2 Sillim Line
- Platforms: 2
- Tracks: 4

Construction
- Structure type: Underground

Key dates
- May 22, 1984: Line 2 opened
- May 28, 2022: Sillim Line opened

Passengers
- (Daily) Based on Jan-Dec of 2012. Line 2: 145,527

Services
Preceding station	Seoul Metropolitan Subway	Following station
Bongcheon Next counterclockwise	Line 2	Sindaebang Next clockwise
Danggok towards Saetgang	Sillim Line	Seowon towards Gwanaksan
Location

Sillim Station is a station on Seoul Subway Line 2 and the Sillim Line. It is located in Sillim-dong, Gwanak-gu, Seoul.

== Station layout ==
G	Street level	Exit

L1; Concourse	Lobby	Customer Service, Shops, Vending machines, ATMs

L2; Platform level	Inner circle	← Line 2 Next clockwise (Sindaebang)
L2; Platform level	Island platform, doors will open on the left
L2; Platform level	Outer circle	Line 2 Next counterclockwise (Bongcheon) →

== Vicinity ==
The Sillim area is a crowded area because of many shopping malls and restaurants. Sundae chon is famous among residents. Renaissance shopping mall is located nearby, which sells articles from men's clothes to accessories. Restaurants like Lotteria, Hans Deli, as well as Krispy Kreme are also popular and close to the station. Seoul National University and Soongsil University are not far from here.

== Passenger load ==
In a survey conducted in 2011 by the Ministry of Land, Transport and Maritime Affairs on 92 Administrative divisions across the country, it reported that Sillim Station is the fifth busiest public transit stop following Gangnam Station, Jamsil Station, Sadang Station and Seolleung Station.

== Gallery ==
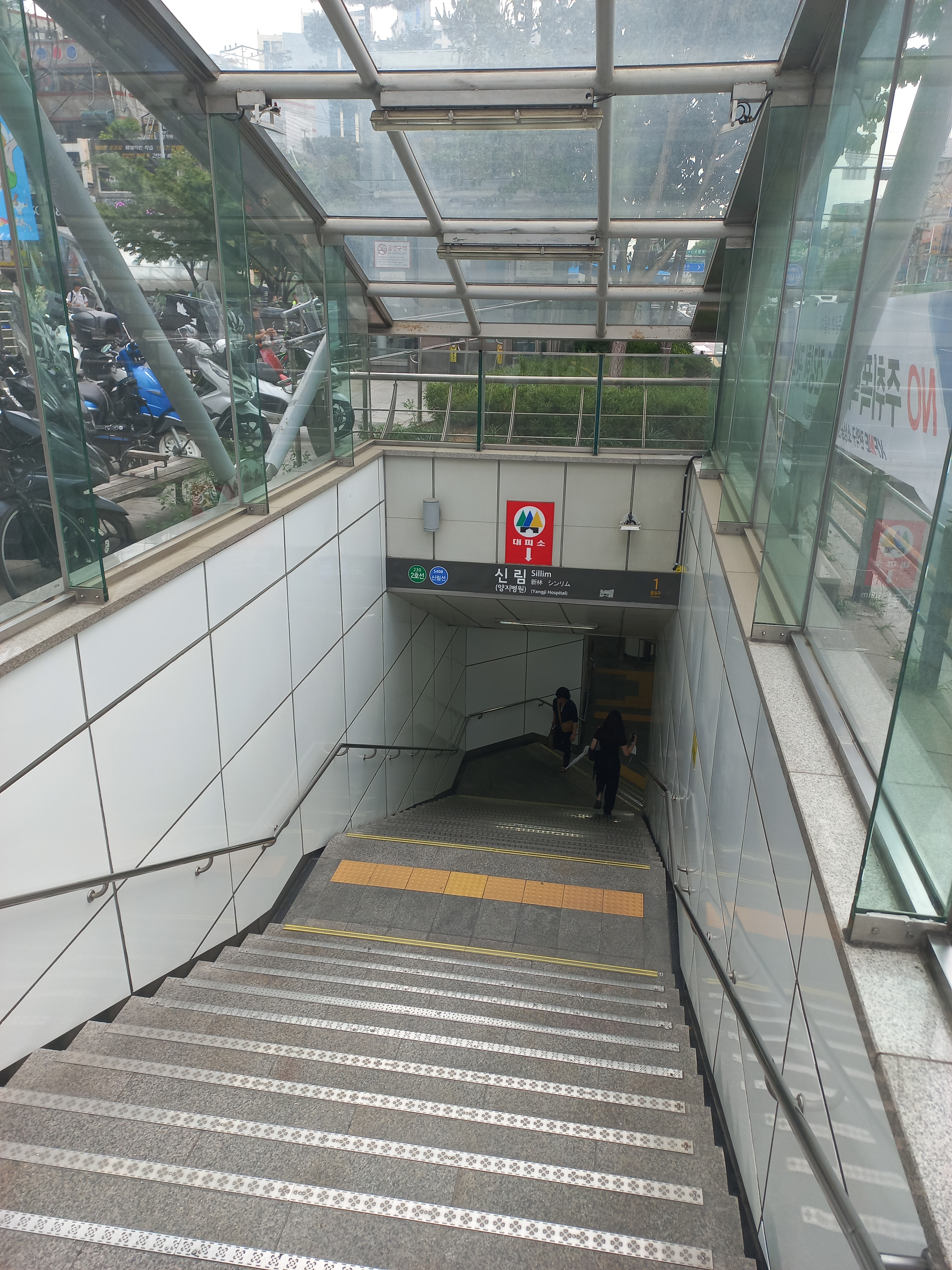
Exit 1

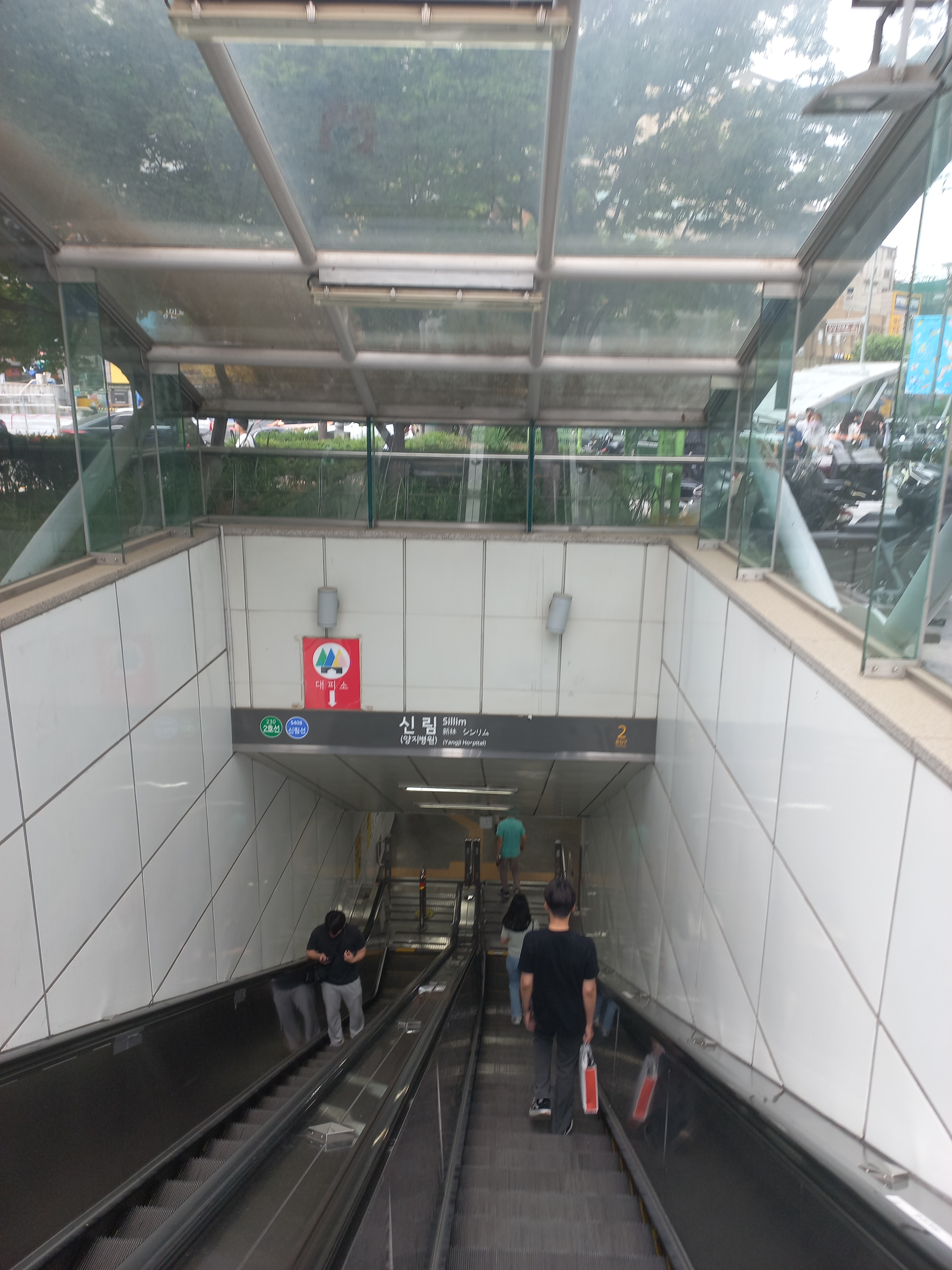
Exit 2

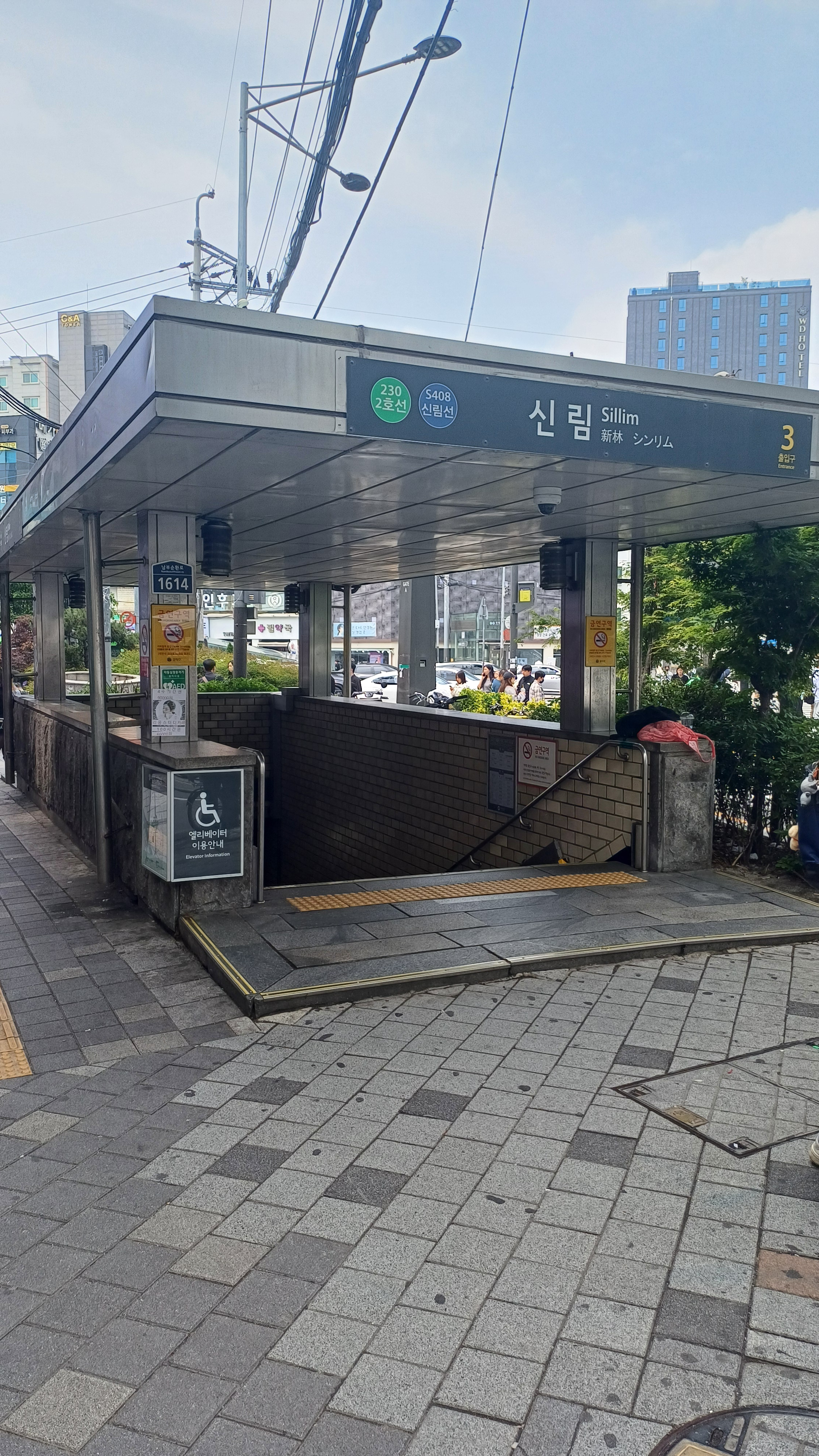
Exit 3

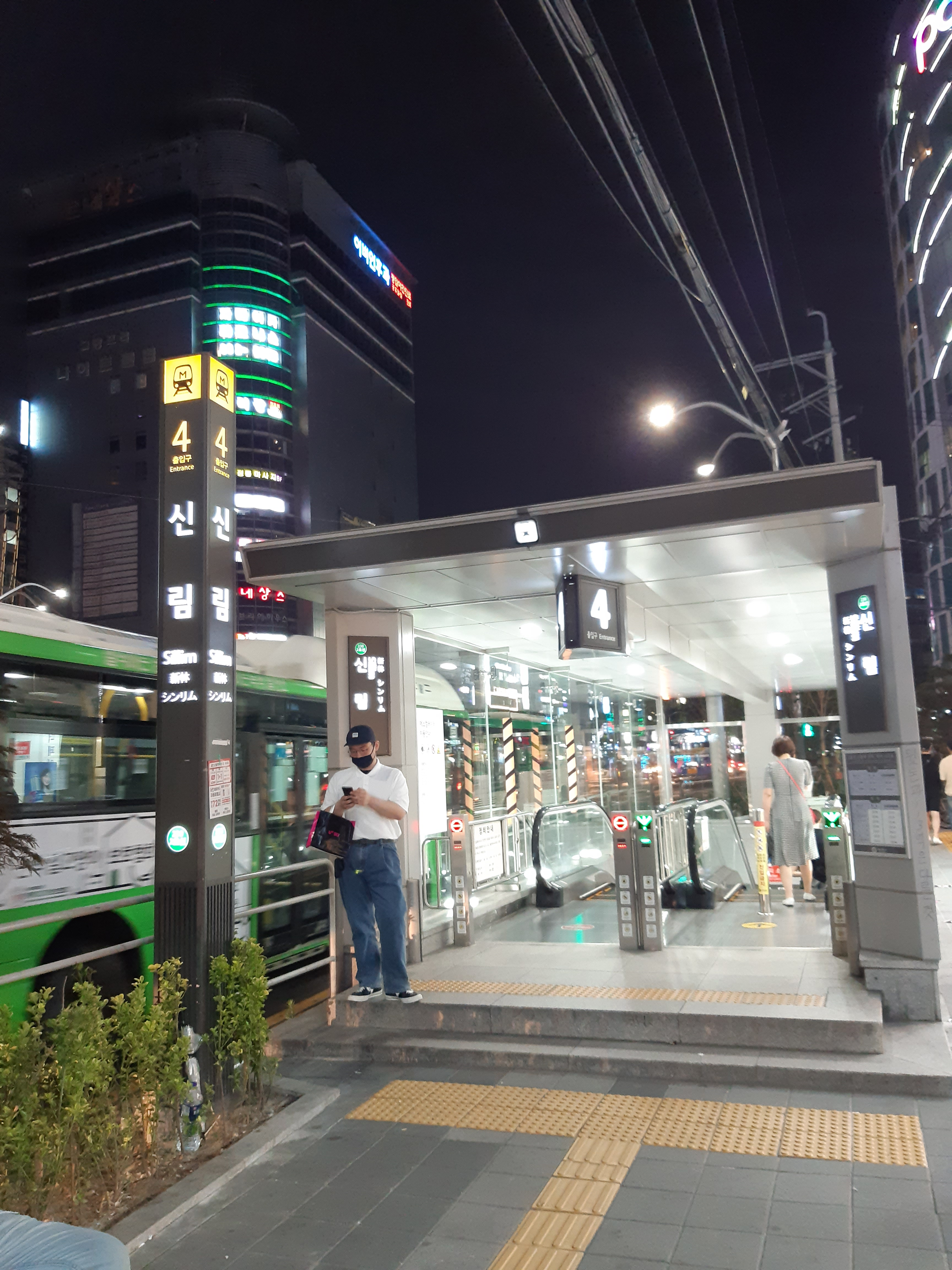
Exit 4

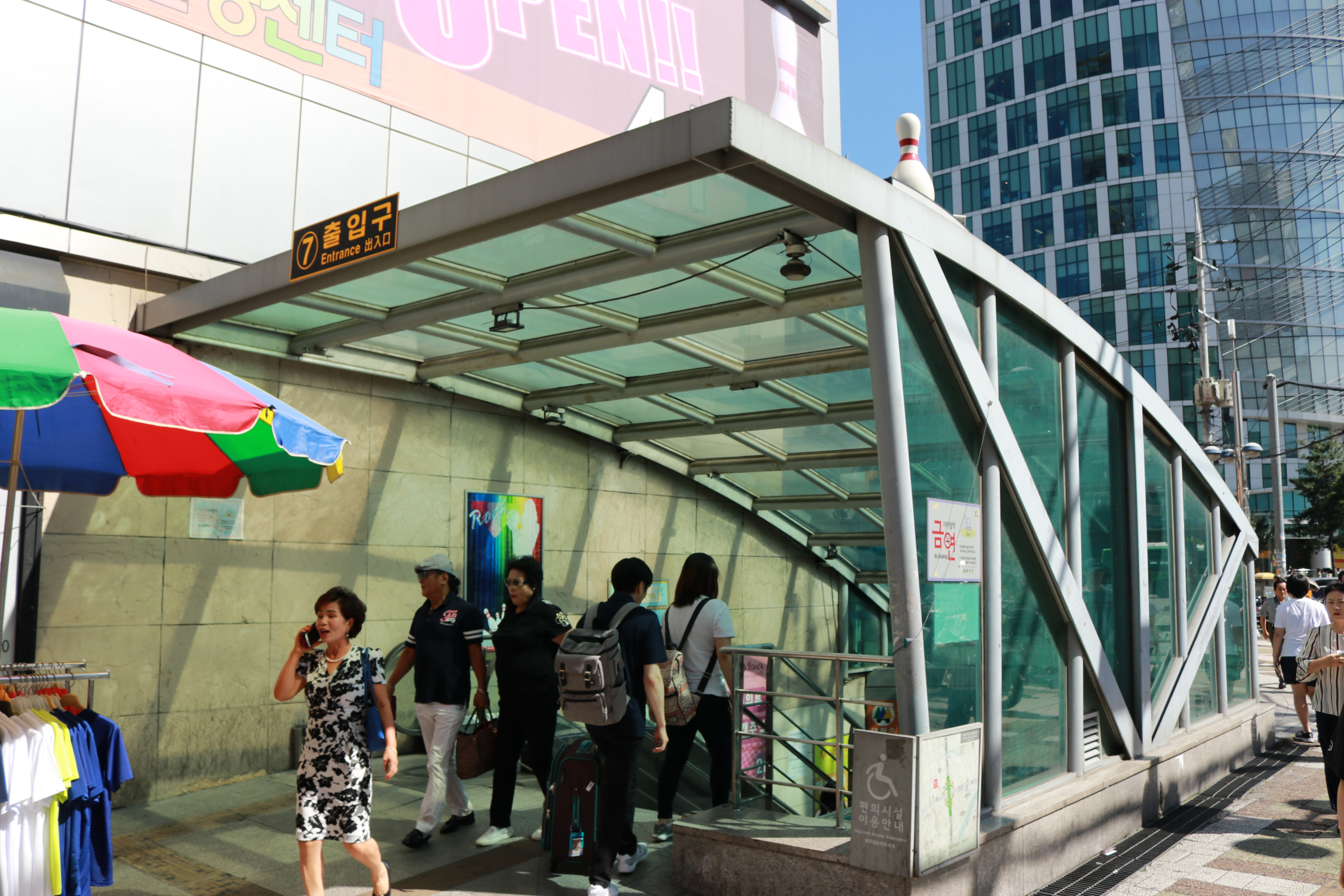
Exit 7

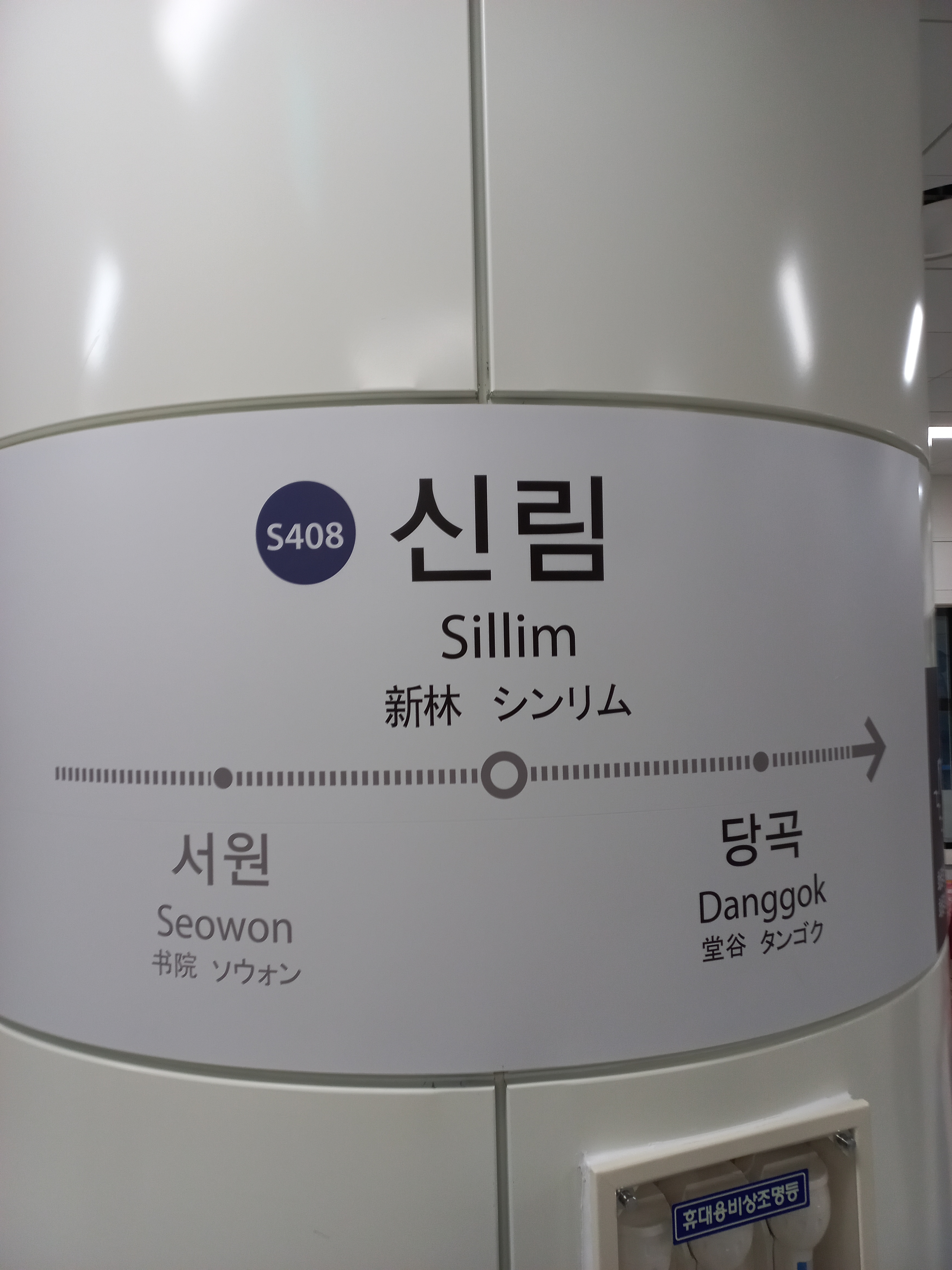
Sillim Line station name platform sign

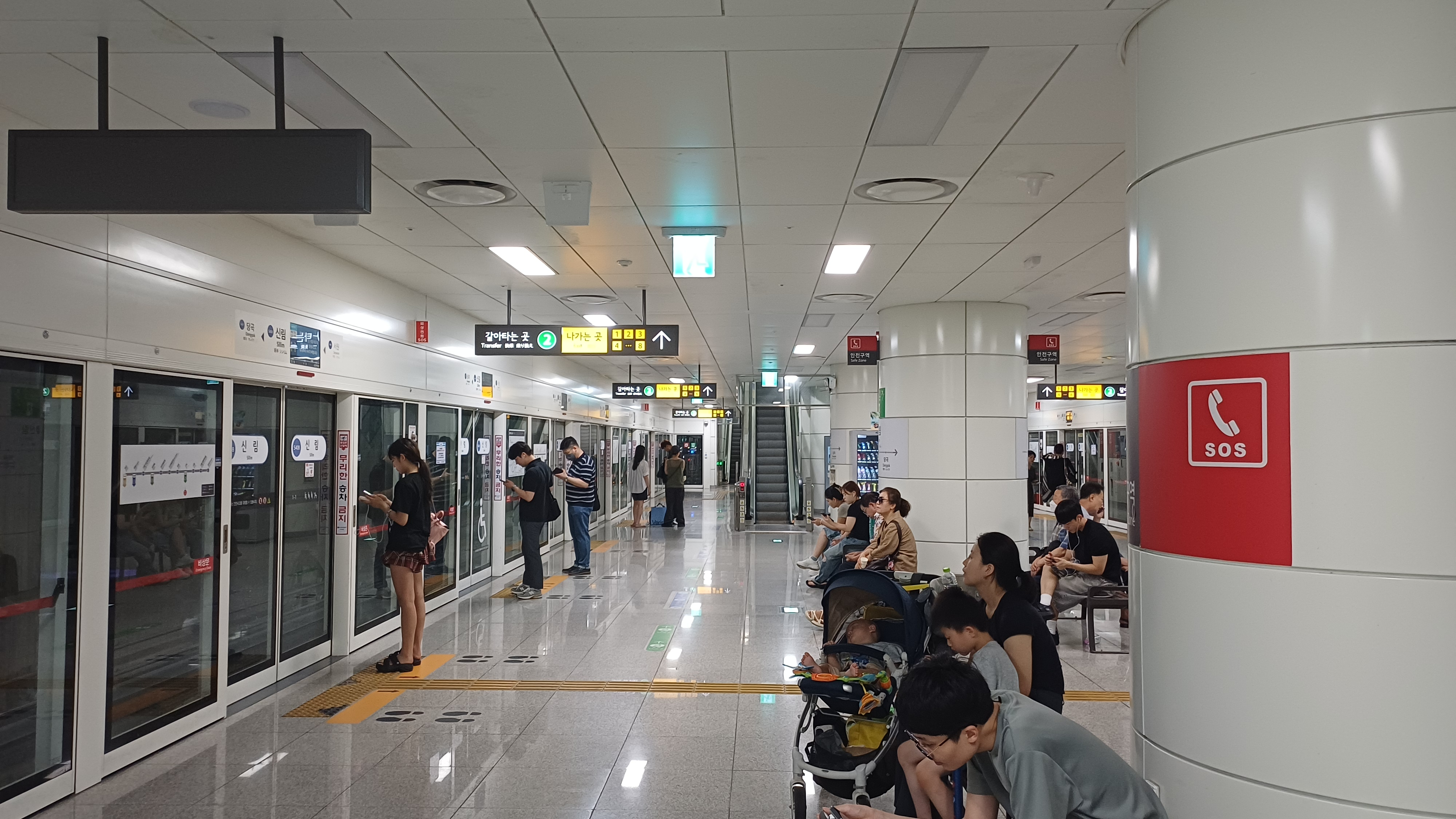
Sillim Line platform
