= Seobu Line =

Railway line in Seoul, South Korea

Overview
- Native name: 서울 경전철 서부선 (西部線)
- Status: Planned
- Termini: Saejeol; Seoul National University
- Stations: 16

History
- Planned opening: 2026

Technical
- Line length: 16.23 km (10.08 mi)

The Seobu Line (Korean: 서부선; Hanja: 西部線) is a future subway line scheduled to open in 2026, in Seoul, South Korea. Construction is scheduled to begin in 2021.

== Stations ==
The names of the stations are not yet final.

Station Number	Station Name English	Station Name Hangul	Station Name Hanja	Transfer	Distance in km	Total Distance	Location	
S510	Saejeol (Sinsa)	새절 (신사)	새절 (新寺)	Seoul Subway Line 6			Seoul	Eunpyeong-gu
S511	Eungamsamgeori	응암삼거리	鷹岩三거리				Seoul	Eunpyeong-gu
S512	Myongji University	명지대	明知大				Seoul	Seodaemun-gu
S513	Yeonhui	연희	延禧				Seoul	Seodaemun-gu
S514	Yonsei University	연세대	延世大				Seoul	Seodaemun-gu
S515	Sinchon	신촌	新村	Seoul Subway Line 2			Seoul	Mapo-gu
S516	Gwangheungchang (Seogang)	광흥창 (서강)	廣興倉 (西江)	Seoul Subway Line 6			Seoul	Mapo-gu
S517	Yeouido Gospel Church	여의도순복음교회	汝矣島純福音敎會				Seoul	Yeongdeungpo-gu
S518	Korea Exchange	한국거래소	韓國去來所				Seoul	Yeongdeungpo-gu
S519	Yeouido St. Mary's Hospital	여의도성모병원	汝矣島聖母病院				Seoul	Yeongdeungpo-gu
S520	Noryangjin	노량진	鷺梁津	Seoul Subway Line 1 Seoul Subway Line 9			Seoul	Dongjak-gu
S521	Jangseungbaegi	장승배기	장승배기	Seoul Subway Line 7			Seoul	Dongjak-gu
S522	Shinsangdo	신상도	新上道				Seoul	Dongjak-gu
S523	Hyundai Market	현대시장	現代市場				Seoul	Gwanak-gu
S524	Euncheon	은천	殷川				Seoul	Gwanak-gu
S525	Seoul National University (Gwanak-gu Office)	서울대입구 (관악구청)	서울大入口 (冠岳區廳)	Seoul Subway Line 2			Seoul	Gwanak-gu

=== Extension ===
Station Number	Station Name English	Station Name Hangul	Station Name Hanja	Transfer	Distance in km	Total Distance	Location	
S525	Seoul National University (Gwanak-gu Office)	서울대입구 (관악구청)	서울大入口 (冠岳區廳)	Seoul Subway Line 2			Seoul	Gwanak-gu
S526	Seoul National University(Sillim Line)	서울대	서울大	Sillim Line			Seoul	Gwanak-gu
