= Boramae station =

Station of the Seoul Metropolitan Subway

보라매 (현대에이치티); Boramae (Hyundai HT)
S404
보라매
Boramae
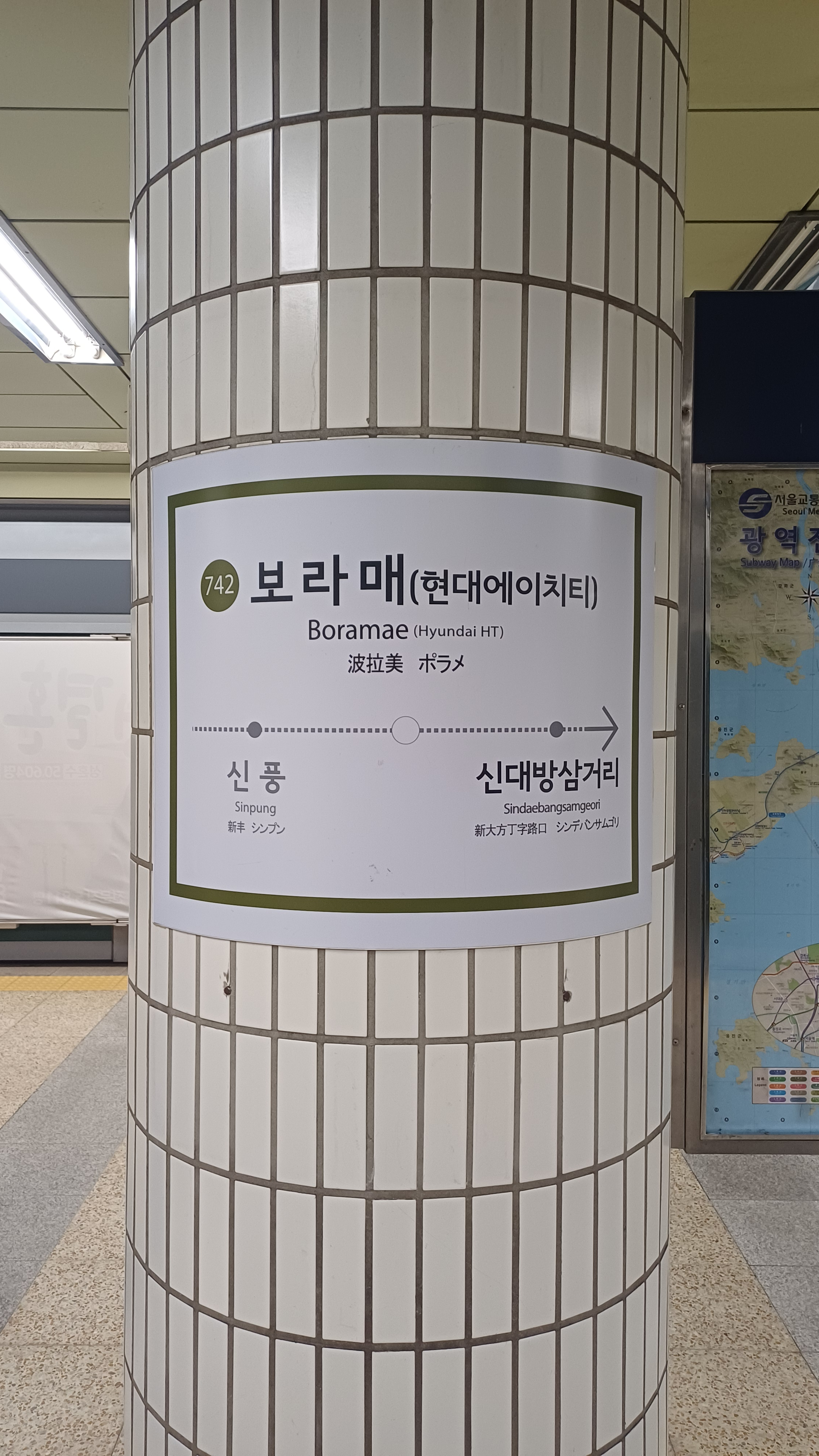
- Line 7 station name platform sign

Korean name
- Hangul: 보라매역
- Hanja: 보라매驛
- Revised Romanization: Boramae-yeok
- McCune–Reischauer: Poramae-yŏk

General information
- Location: 4884 Singil-dong, 121 Sinpungno, Yeongdeungpo-gu, Seoul
- Coordinates: 37°30′00″N 126°55′12″E
- Operator: Seoul Metro; South Seoul LRT Co., Ltd.
- Lines: Line 7 Sillim Line
- Platforms: 3
- Tracks: 4

Construction
- Structure type: Underground

Key dates
- August 1, 2000: Line 7 opened
- May 28, 2022: Sillim Line opened
Location

Boramae Station is a station on Seoul Subway Line 7 and the Sillim Line. It is named after a nearby park with the same name. However, Boramae Park is much closer to Sindaebang Station.

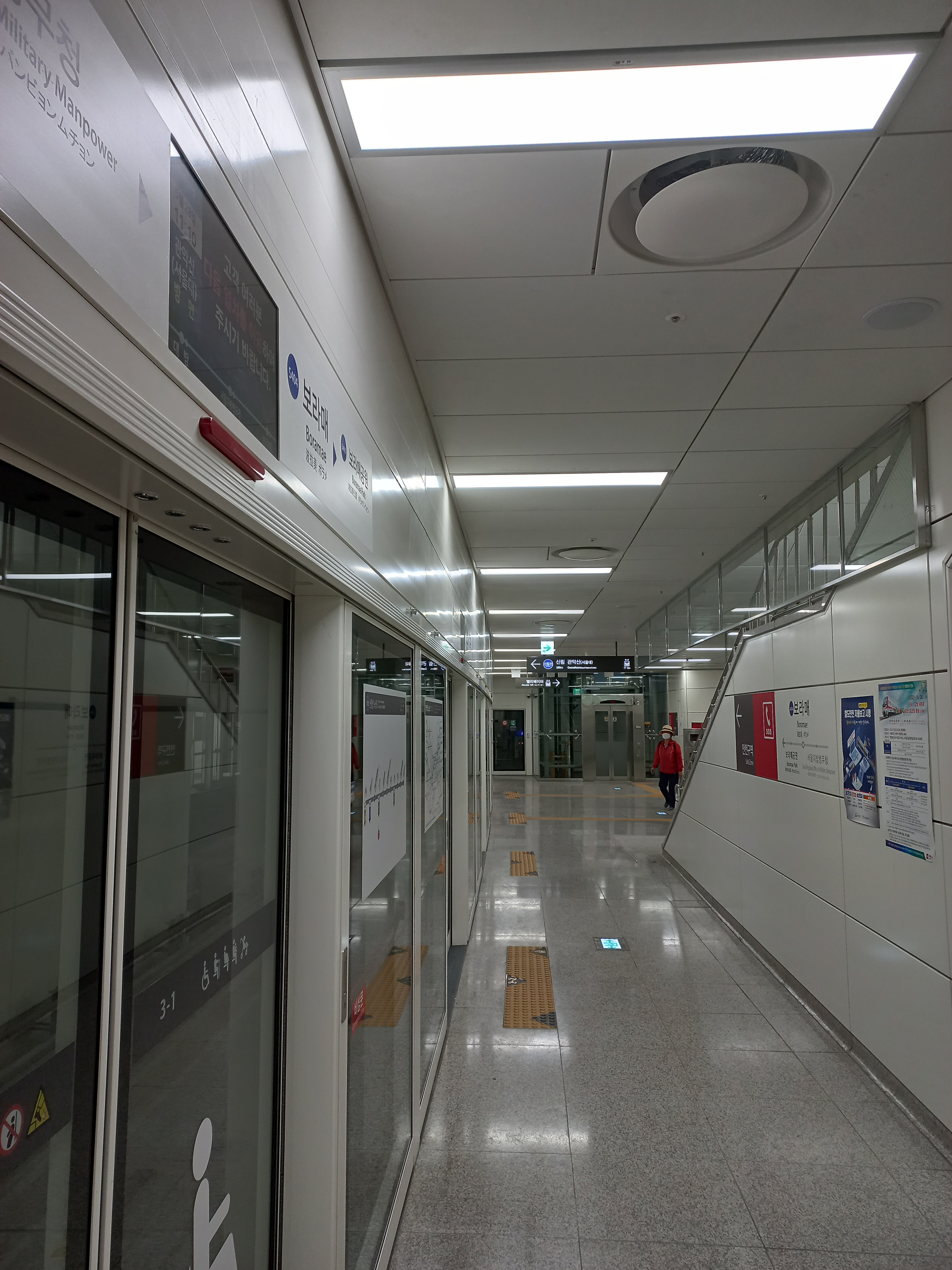
Sillim Line platform

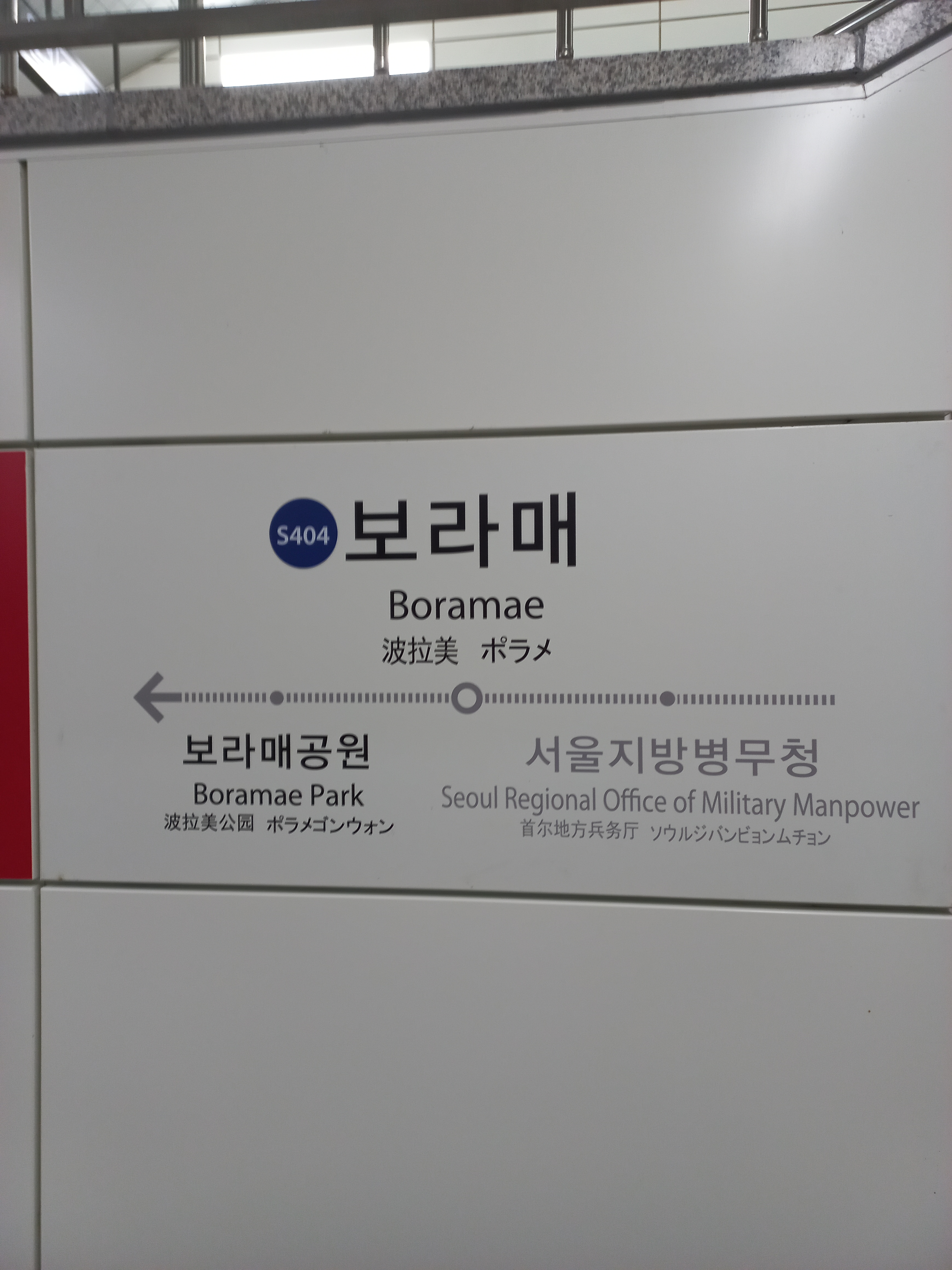
Sillim Line station name platform sign

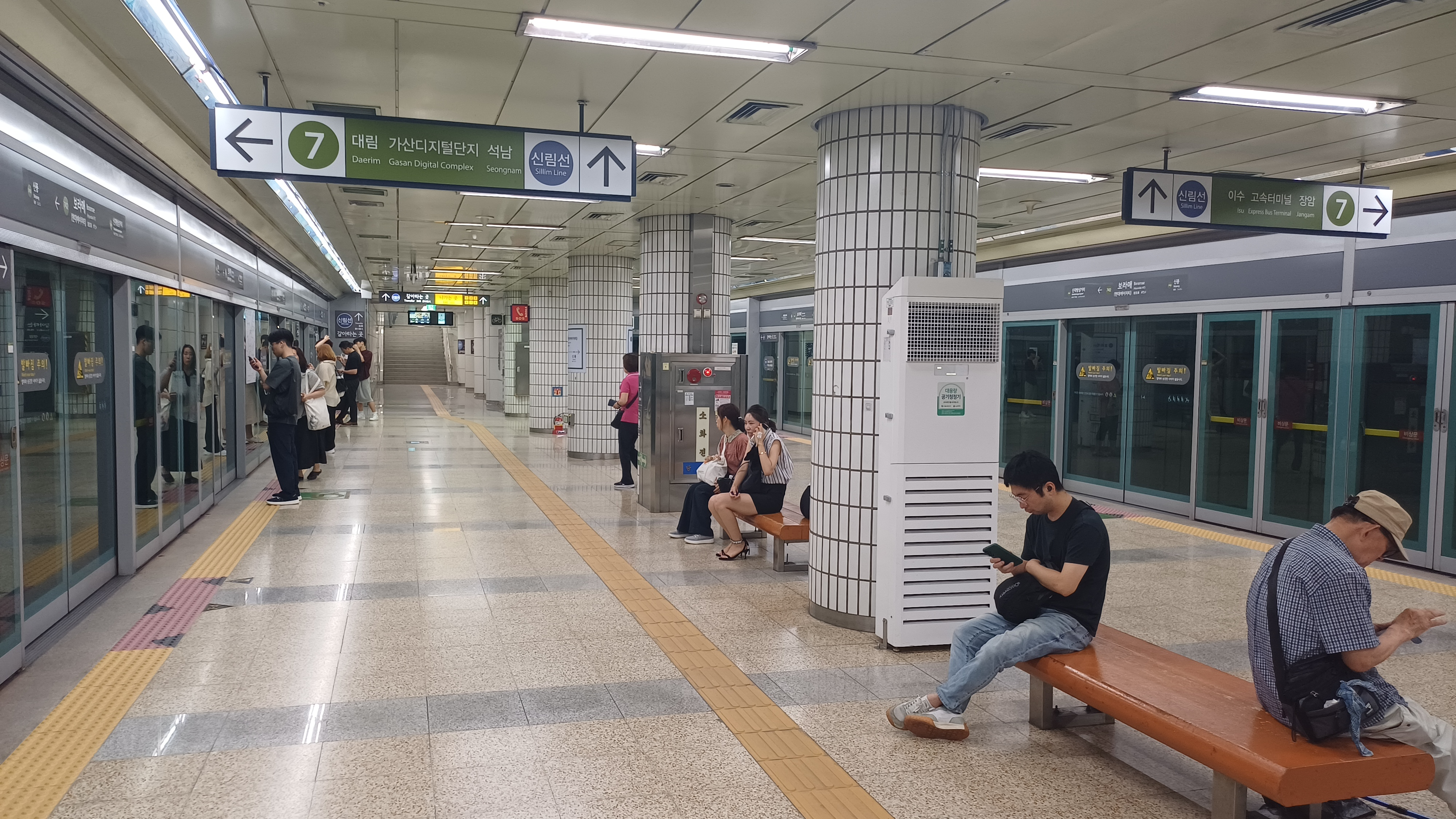
Line 7 platforms

== Station layout ==
Sindaebangsamgeori ↑
| S/B N/B |
↓ Sinpung

Southbound	← ● Line 7 toward Seongnam
Northbound	● Line 7 toward Jangam →

Preceding station	Seoul Metropolitan Subway	Following station
Sindaebangsamgeori towards Jangam	Line 7	Sinpung towards Seongnam
Seoul Regional Office of Military Manpower towards Saetgang	Sillim Line	Boramae Park towards Gwanaksan
