= Sillim Line =

Light rail line in Seoul, South Korea

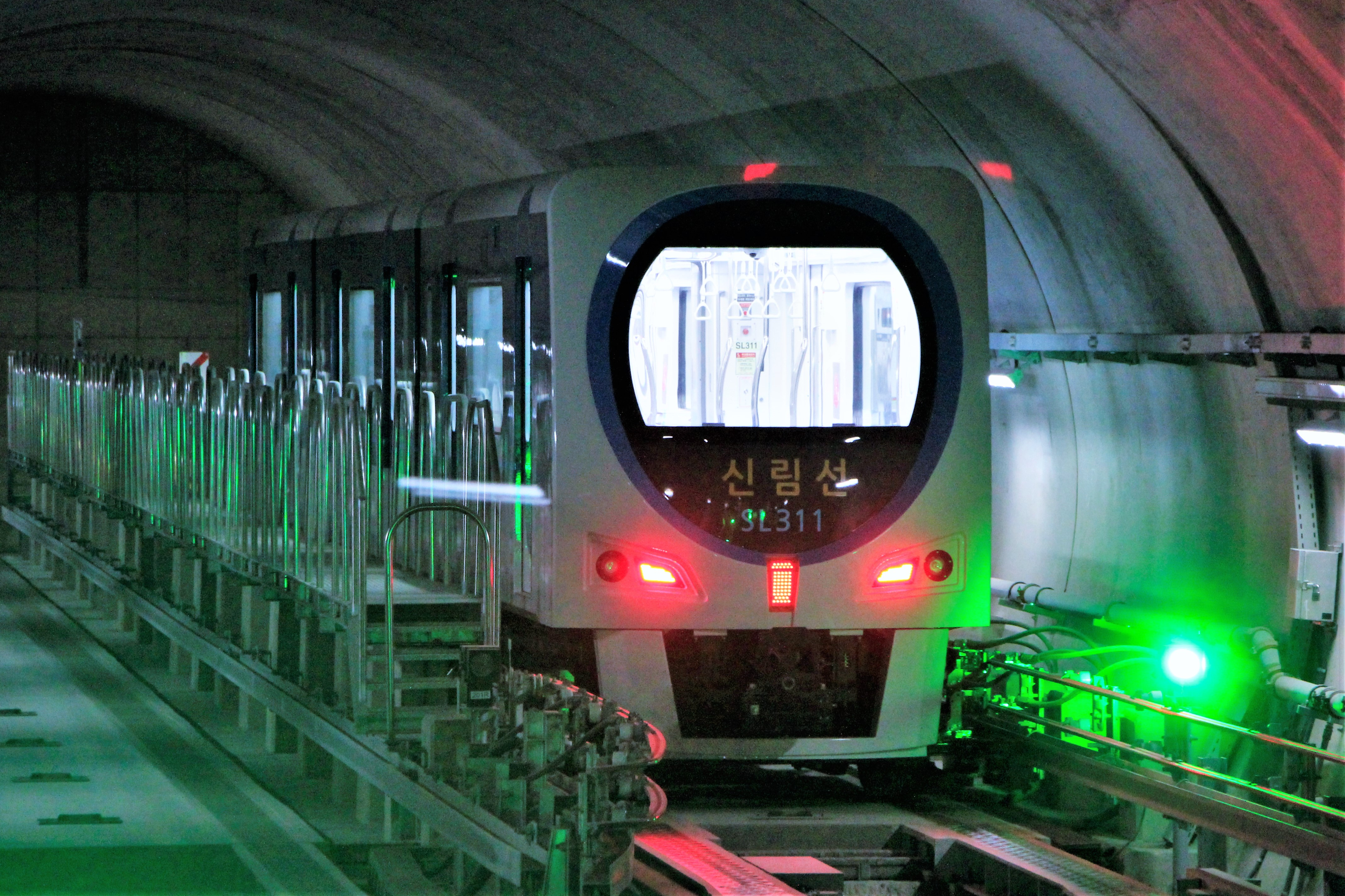

Overview
- Native name: 서울 경전철 신림선 (新林線); Sillimseon
- Status: Operational
- Termini: Saetgang; Gwanaksan
- Stations: 11

Service
- Type: Rubber-tyred light metro
- System: Seoul Metropolitan Subway
- Rolling stock: 12 × 3-car Woojin SL000
- Daily ridership: 78,314 (2024)
- Ridership: 28.66 million (2024) (▲8.2%)

History
- Opened: 28 May 2022

Technical
- Line length: 7.8 km (4.8 mi)
- Number of tracks: 2
- Track gauge: 1,700 mm (5 ft 6 15/16 in)
- Electrification: 750 V DC
- Operating speed: 60 km/h (37 mph)
- Signalling: LS Electric KTCS-M
Route map
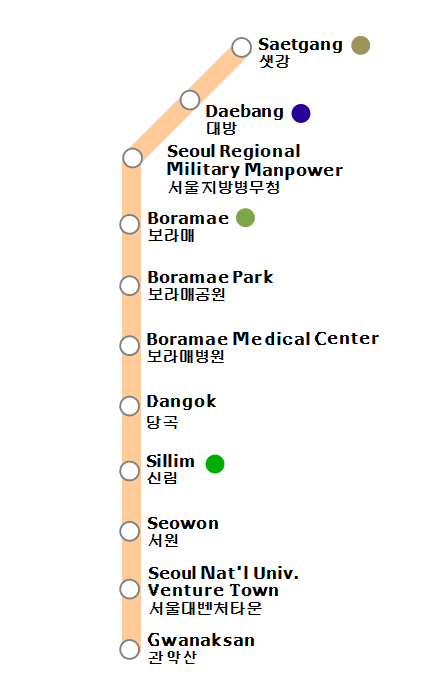

The Sillim Line (Korean: 신림선) is a rubber-tyred light metro which is part of the Seoul Metropolitan Subway. It opened on May 24, 2022.

== Stations ==
=== Main line ===
All stations are in Seoul.

Station Number	Station name English	Station name Hangul	Transfer	Distance in km	Total Distance	Location
S401	Saetgang	샛강	Seoul Subway Line 9	---	0.0	Yeongdeungpo-gu
S402	Daebang (Sungae Hospital)	대방 (성애병원)	Seoul Subway Line 1	0.6	0.6	Yeongdeungpo-gu
S403	Seoul Regional Office of Military Manpower	서울지방병무청		0.9	1.5	Yeongdeungpo-gu
S404	Boramae	보라매	Seoul Subway Line 7	0.6	2.1	Dongjak-gu
S405	Boramae Park	보라매공원	Nangok branch	0.6	2.7	Dongjak-gu
S406	Boramae Medical Center (Korea Specialty Contractor Center)	보라매병원 (전문건설회관)		0.8	3.5	Dongjak-gu
S407	Danggok	당곡		0.5	4.0	Gwanak-gu
S408	Sillim	신림	Seoul Subway Line 2	0.7	4.7	Gwanak-gu
S409	Seowon	서원		0.7	5.4	Gwanak-gu
S410	Seoul National Univ. Venture Town	서울대벤처타운		1.1	6.5	Gwanak-gu
S411	Gwanaksan (Seoul National Univ.)	관악산 (서울대)		1.1	7.6	Gwanak-gu

== Proposed extensions ==
A northern extension towards Dongyeouido (station name is not determined yet) is currently being considered to provide transfers to the Seobu Line.

A five-station branch line from Boramae Park is also currently being considered. Citizens of Geumcheon District have lobbied for a further extension of the branch to Geumcheon-gu Office station. The proposed stations are listed below.

All stations are in Seoul.

Station Number	Station name English	Station name Hangul	Station name Hanja	Transfer	Distance in km	Total Distance	Location
	Boramae Park	보라매공원	보라매公園	Nangok branch			Dongjak-gu
	Sindaebang	신대방	新大方	Seoul Subway Line 2			Dongjak-gu
	Nangoksageori	난곡사거리	蘭谷四거리				Gwanak-gu
	Misung	미성	美星				Gwanak-gu
	Nangok	난곡	蘭谷				Gwanak-gu
	Nanhyang	난향	蘭香				Gwanak-gu

A two-station southern extension of the line into the Seoul National University campus was considered but ultimately cancelled.

== Ridership ==
Sillim Line Ridership
Year	Ridership	Change (%)	Remarks
2026			
2025			
2024	28,663,000	▲8.2	
2023	26,483,000	▲101.1	
2022	13,174,000	-	Operations began on May 24, 2022
