= Singil station =

Train station in Seoul, South Korea

Coordinates: 37°31′01″N 126°55′03″E

신길; Singil
신길; Singil
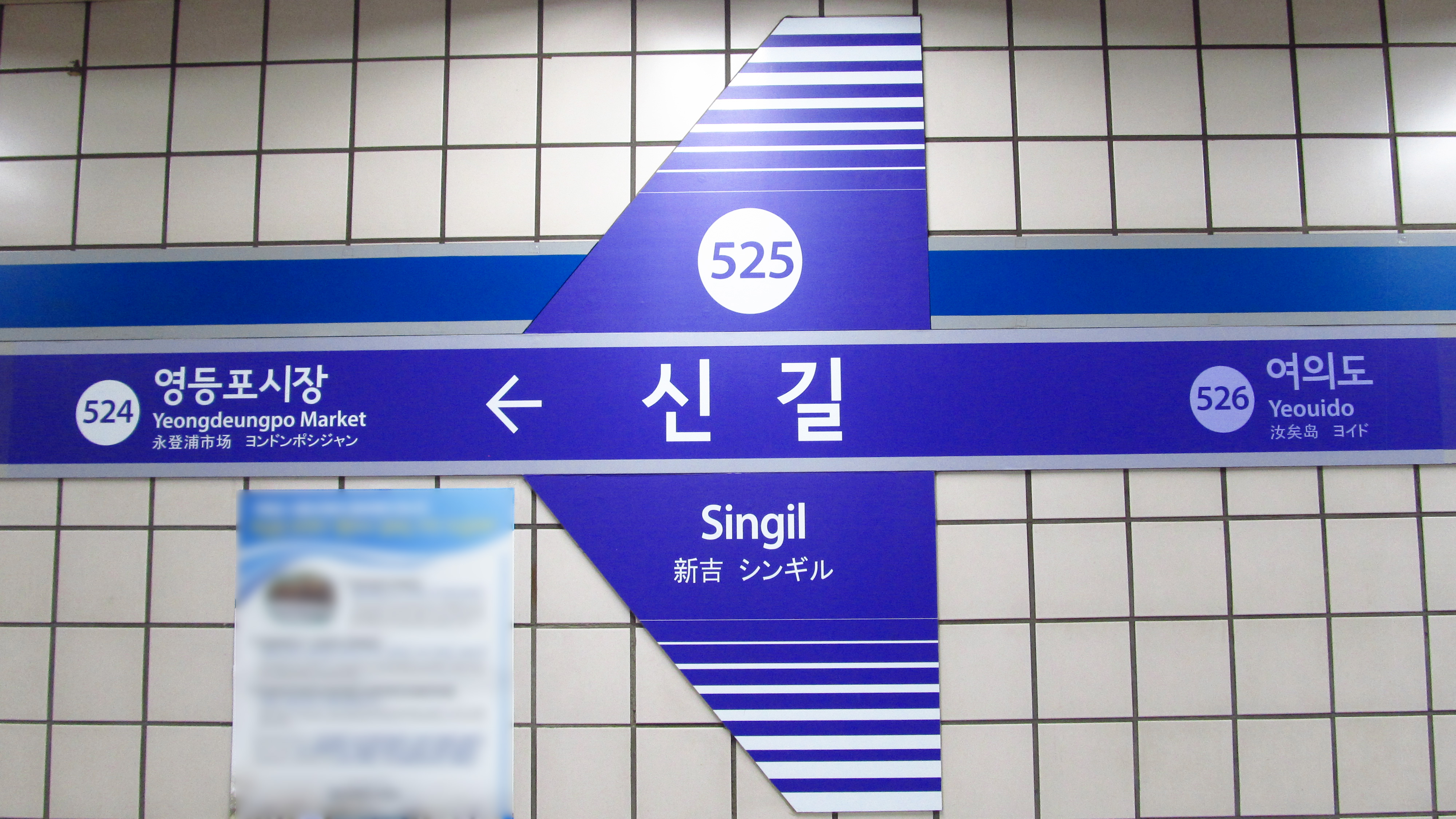

Korean name
- Hangul: 신길역
- Hanja: 新吉驛
- RR: Singil-yeok
- MR: Sin'gil-yŏk

General information
- Location: 327 Yeongdeungporo, Yeongdeungpo-gu, Seoul
- Operator: Korail, Seoul Metro
- Lines: Gyeongbu Line; Line 5
- Platforms: 5
- Tracks: 6

Key dates
- April 30, 1997: Line 1 opened
- August 12, 1996: Line 5 opened

Passengers
- (Daily) Based on Jan-Dec of 2012. Line 1: 20,334; Line 5: 5,130
Services
Preceding station	Seoul Metropolitan Subway	Following station
Daebang towards Kwangwoon University or Yeoncheon	Line 1	Yeongdeungpo towards Incheon, Seodongtan or Sinchang
Daebang towards Dongducheon	Line 1 Gyeongwon Express	Yeongdeungpo towards Incheon
Daebang towards Cheongnyangni	Line 1 Gyeongbu Express	Yeongdeungpo towards Sinchang
Yeongdeungpo Market towards Banghwa	Line 5	Yeouido towards Hanam Geomdansan or Macheon
Location

Singil Station (pronounced shin-gill) is a station on the Seoul Subway's Line 1 and 5.

The transfer distance between the platforms on Lines 1 and 5 are fairly long, around 260 meters. The Line 1 station is the first aboveground station in South Korea to have operating platform screen doors.

On April 14, 2020, at 6:28 a.m., a Korail K1008 express electric train bound for Yongsan station derailed 300 meters near Singil station due to a defect that damaged the axle. There was no casualties, but train operations on Line 1, the Gyeongin Line and the Gyeongbu line were affected.

== Gallery ==
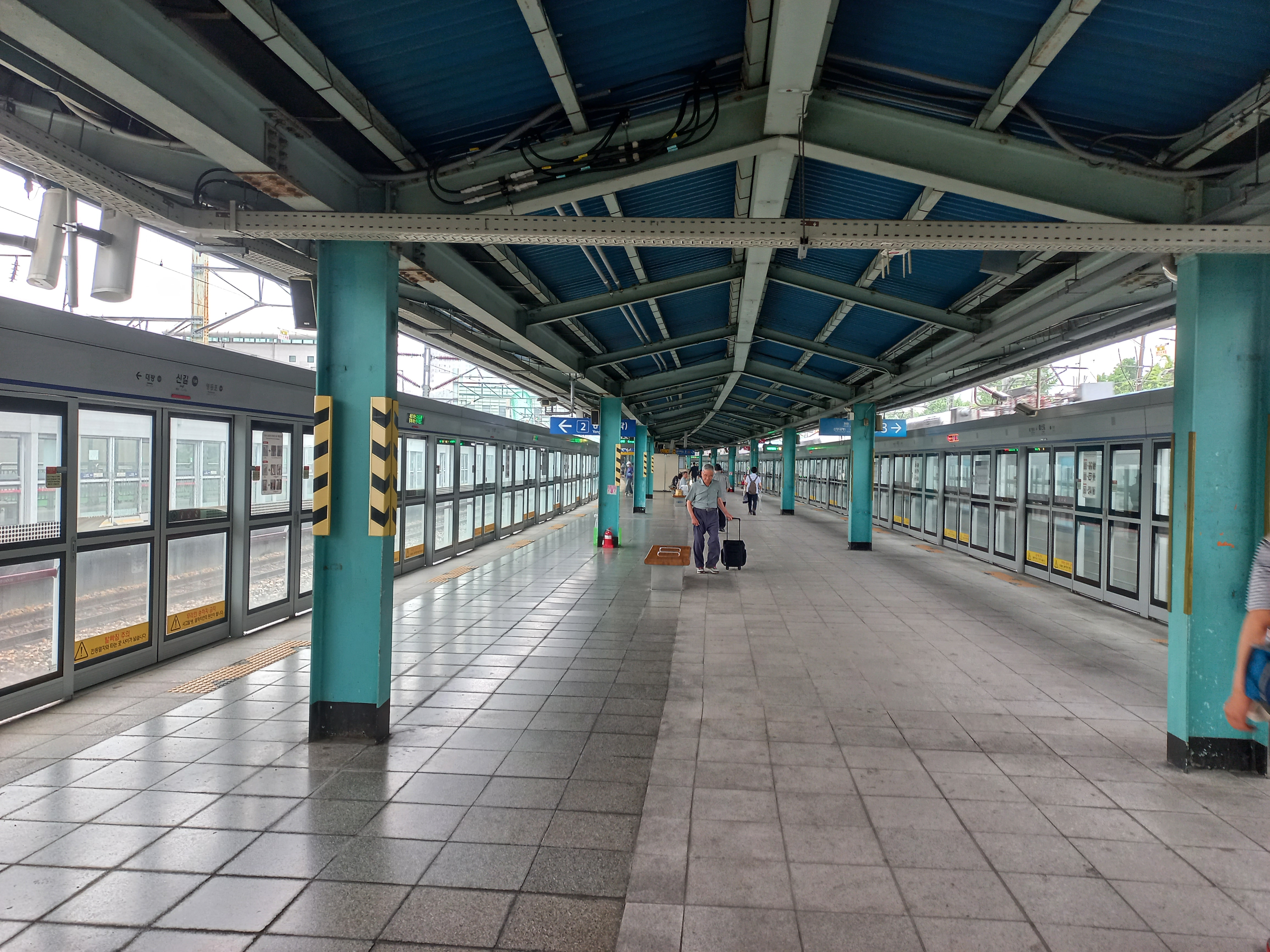
Line 1 platforms

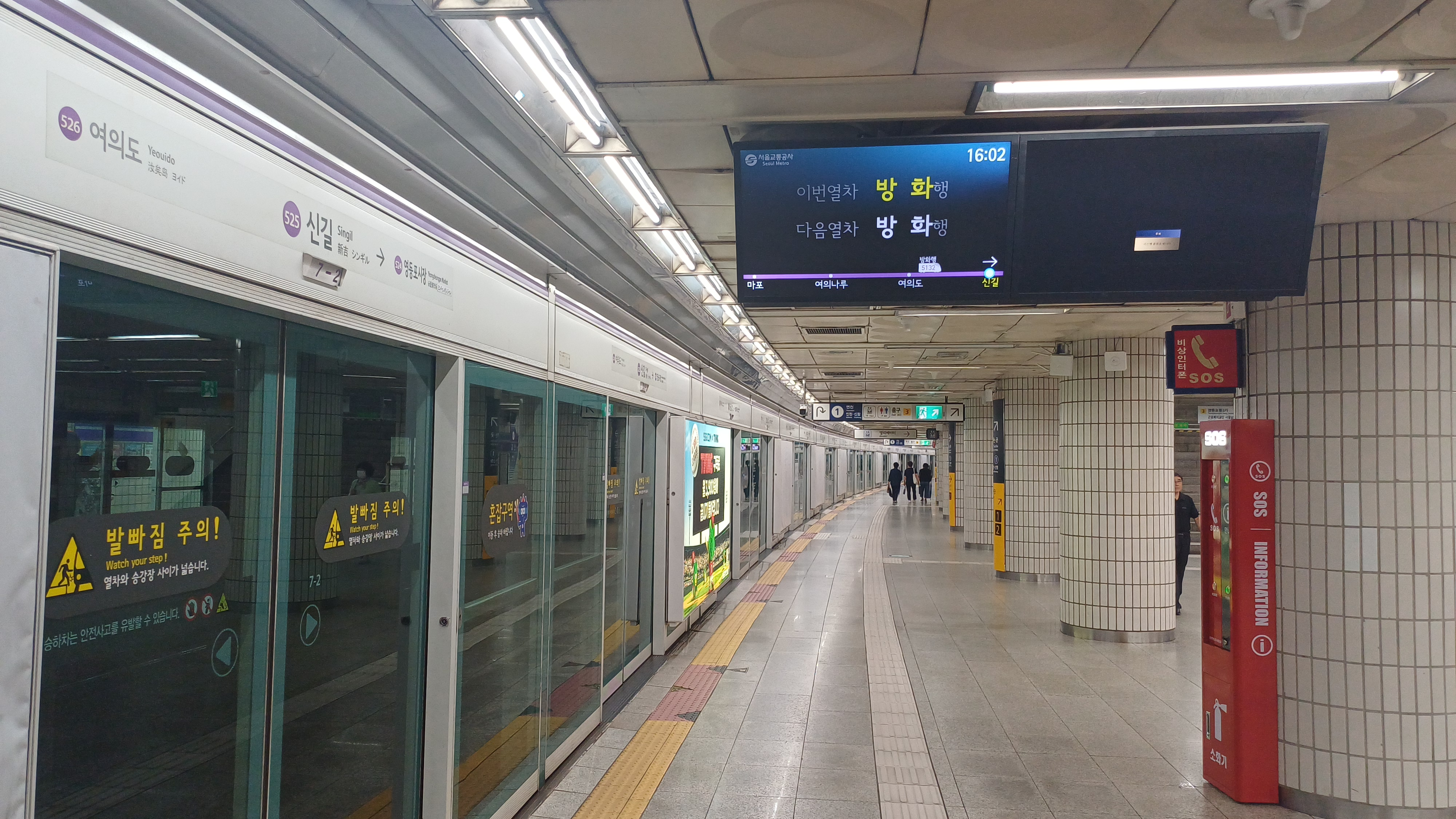
Line 5 platform
