= Daebang-dong =

Neighborhood in Seoul, South Korea

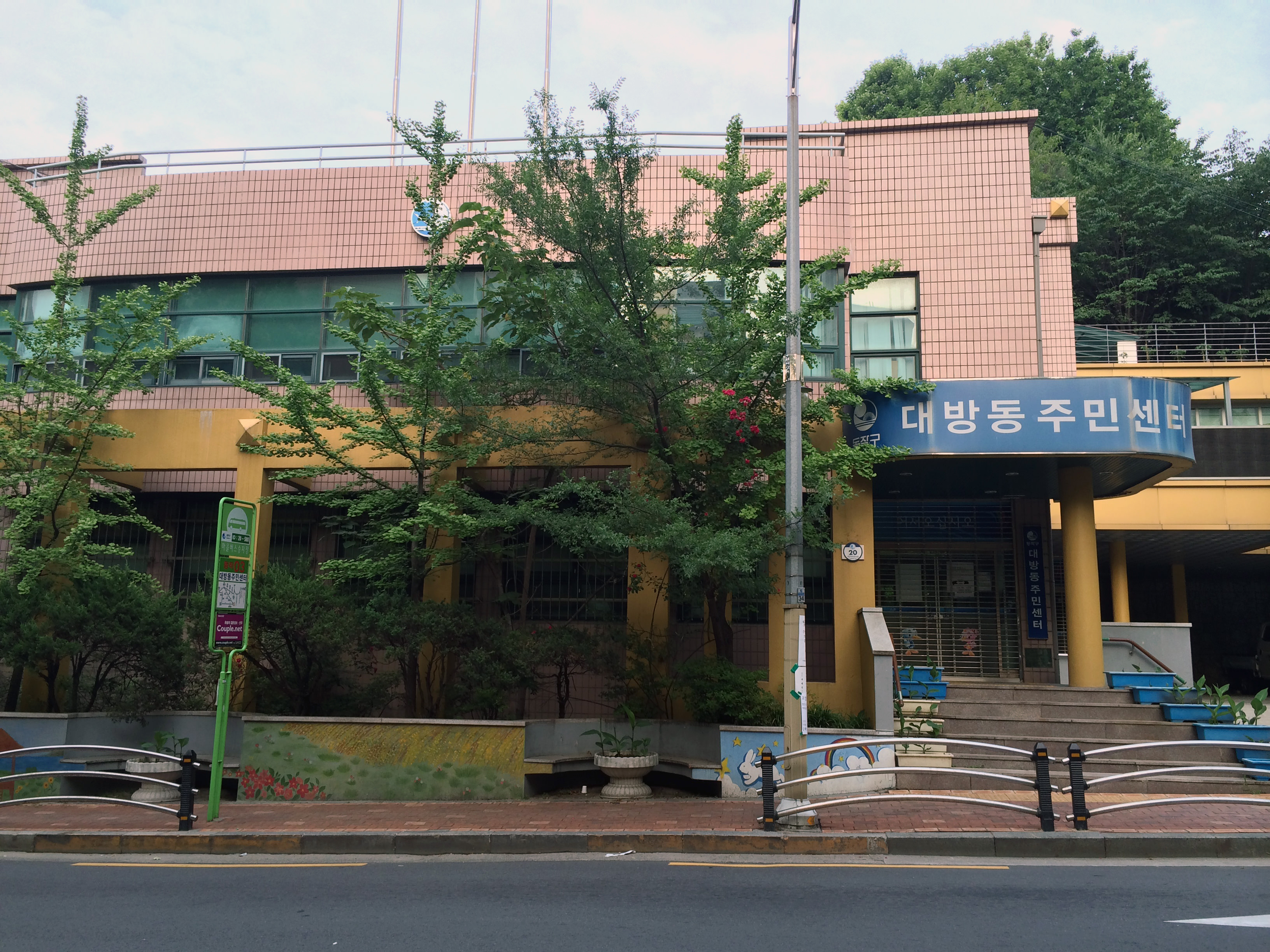
- Daebang-dong Community Service Center
- Interactive map of Daebang-dong
- Country: South Korea

Area
  - Total: 1.55 km^{2} (0.60 sq mi)

Population (2001)
  - Total: 36,652
  - Density: 23,646/km^{2} (61,240/sq mi)

Korean name
- Hangul: 대방동
- Hanja: 大方洞
- RR: Daebang-dong
- MR: Taebang-dong

Daebang-dong (Korean: 대방동) is a dong (neighborhood) of Dongjak District, Seoul, South Korea.

== See also ==
- Administrative divisions of South Korea
