= Noryangjin station =

Metro station in Seoul, South Korea

Coordinates: 37°30′52″N 126°56′34″E

노량진; Noryangjin
노량진; Noryangjin
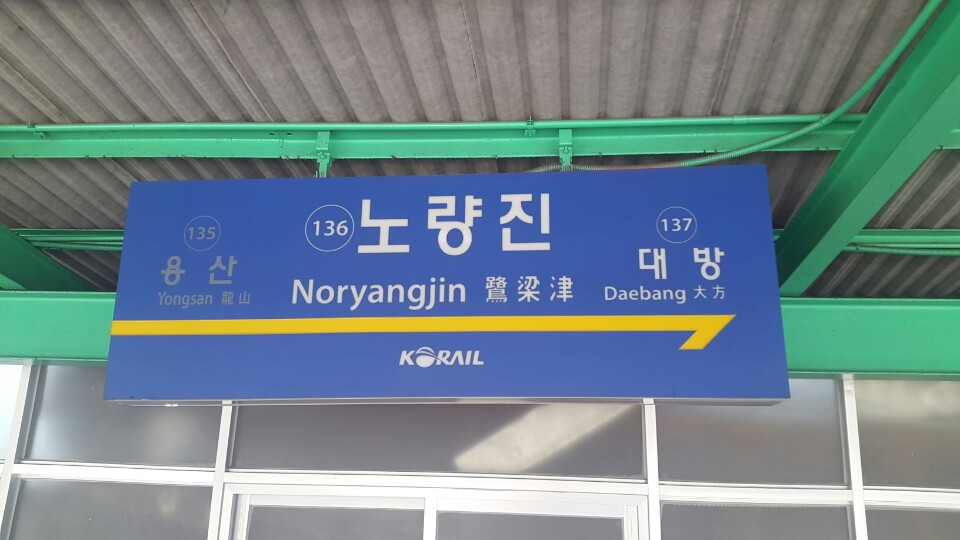
- Station sign (Line 1)

Korean name
- Hangul: 노량진역
- Hanja: 鷺梁津驛
- RR: Noryangjin-yeok
- MR: Noryangjin-yŏk

General information
- Location: 112-1 Noryangjin 1-dong, 151 Noryangjin-ro, Dongjak-gu, Seoul
- Operator: Korail; Seoul Metro Line 9 Corporation
- Lines: Line 1 Line 9
- Platforms: 4 (4 side platforms)
- Tracks: 6

History
- Opened: September 18, 1899; August 15, 1974; July 24, 2009

Passengers
- (Daily) Based on Jan-Dec of 2012. Line 1: 77,070; Line 9: 56,860
Services
Preceding station	Seoul Metropolitan Subway	Following station
Yongsan towards Kwangwoon University or Yeoncheon	Line 1	Daebang towards Incheon, Seodongtan or Sinchang
Yongsan towards Dongducheon	Line 1 Gyeongwon Express	Daebang towards Incheon
Yongsan Terminus	Line 1 Gyeongin Express	Sindorim towards Dongincheon
Yongsan towards Cheongnyangni	Line 1 Gyeongbu Express	Daebang towards Sinchang
Saetgang towards Gaehwa	Line 9	Nodeul towards VHS Medical Center
Yeouido towards Gimpo International Airport	Line 9 Express	Dongjak towards VHS Medical Center
Location

Noryangjin Station (Korean: 노량진역) is a metro station in southwest region of Seoul, South Korea. The station is located in the Noryangjin-dong (neighborhood) of Dongjak-gu (ward) and is also a stop on Seoul Subway Line 1 and Seoul Subway Line 9. This stop is a popular destination for those seeking to eat raw fish, and other assorted seafood, as a large, covered sea food market is located next to the station, accessible by foot bridge. The Line 1 station is also notable in that Exit 1 and 2 have the same number as Exit 1 and 2 of Line 9's station.

== Gallery ==
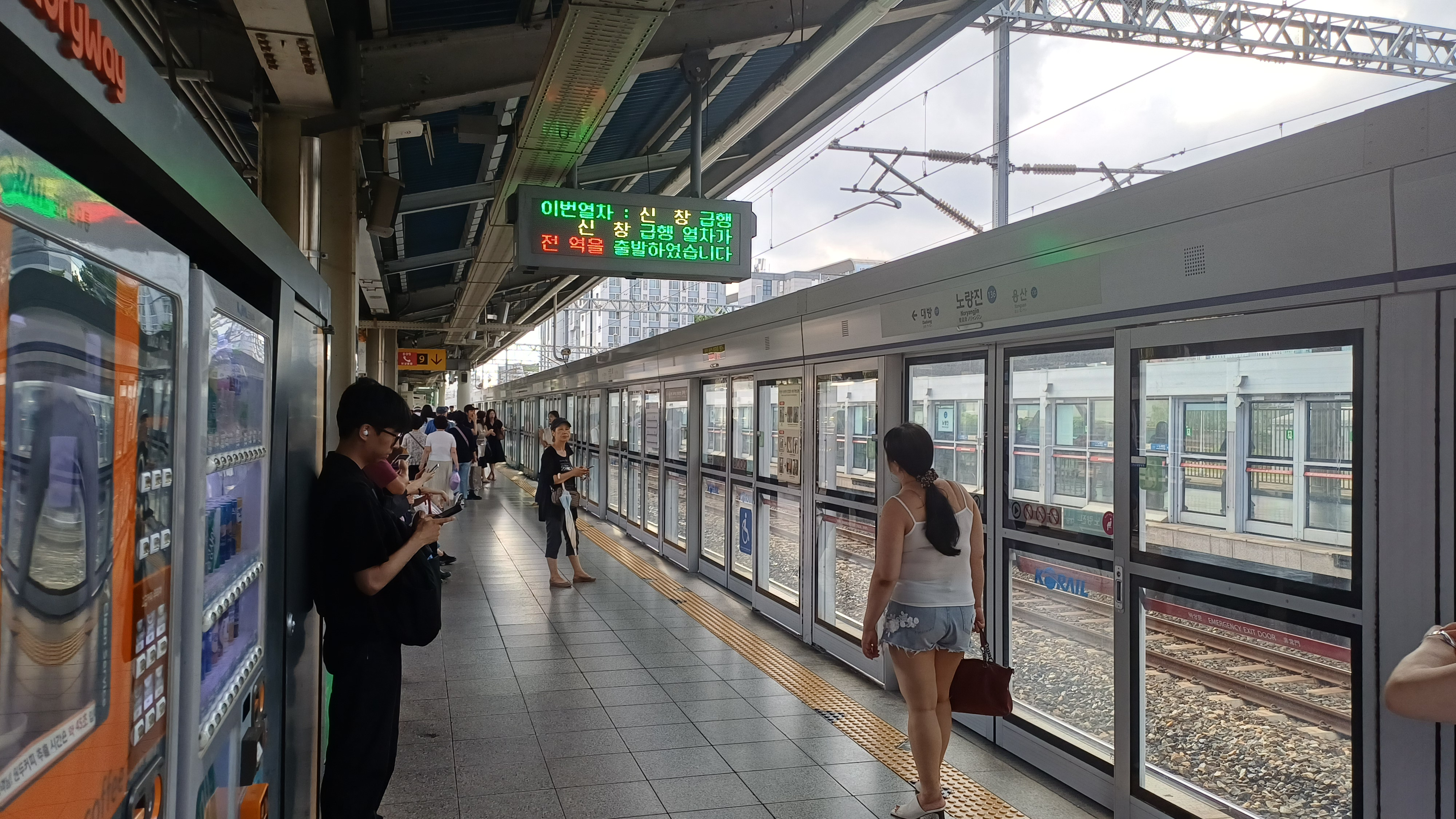
Line 1 platform

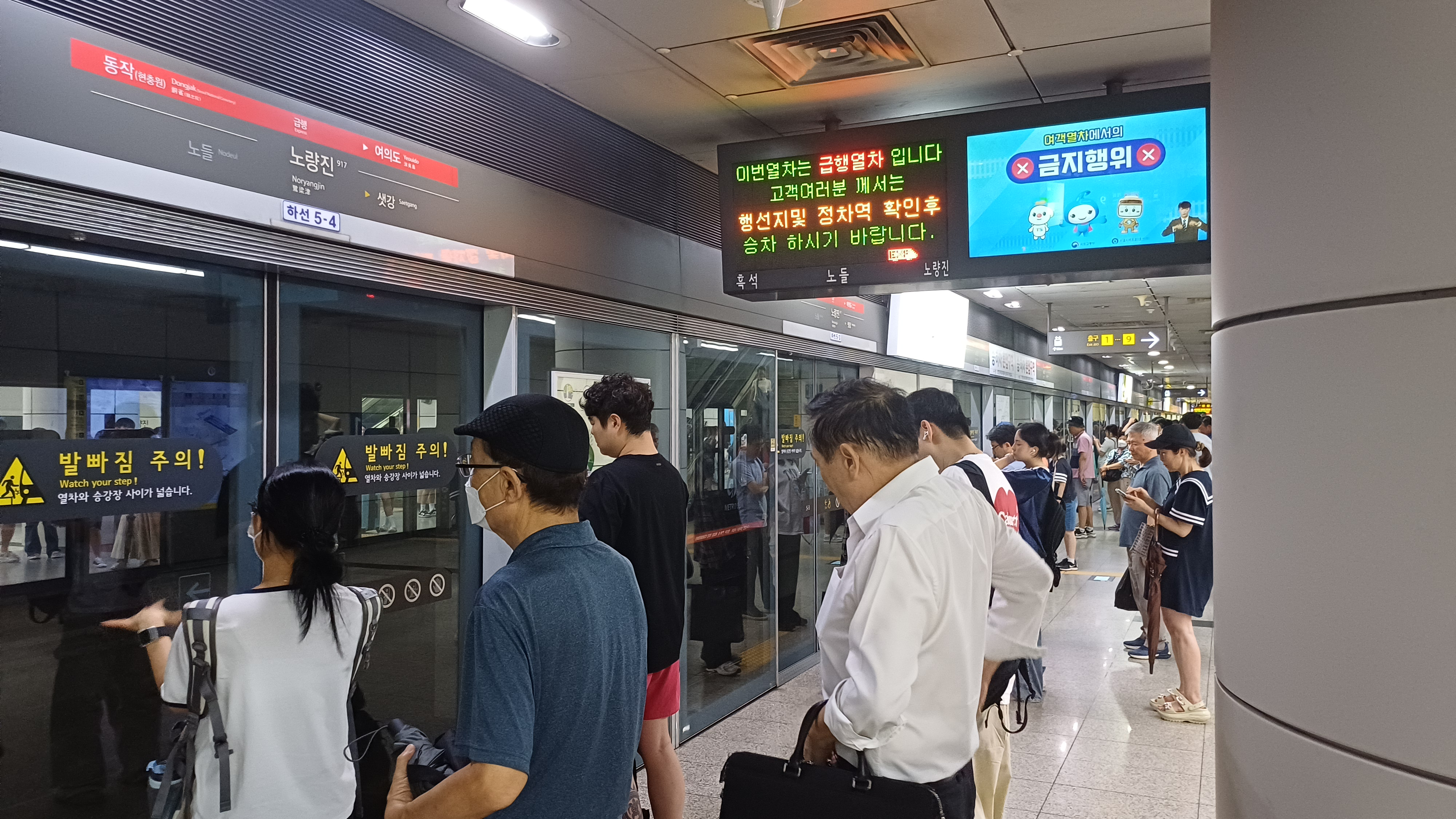
Line 9 platform

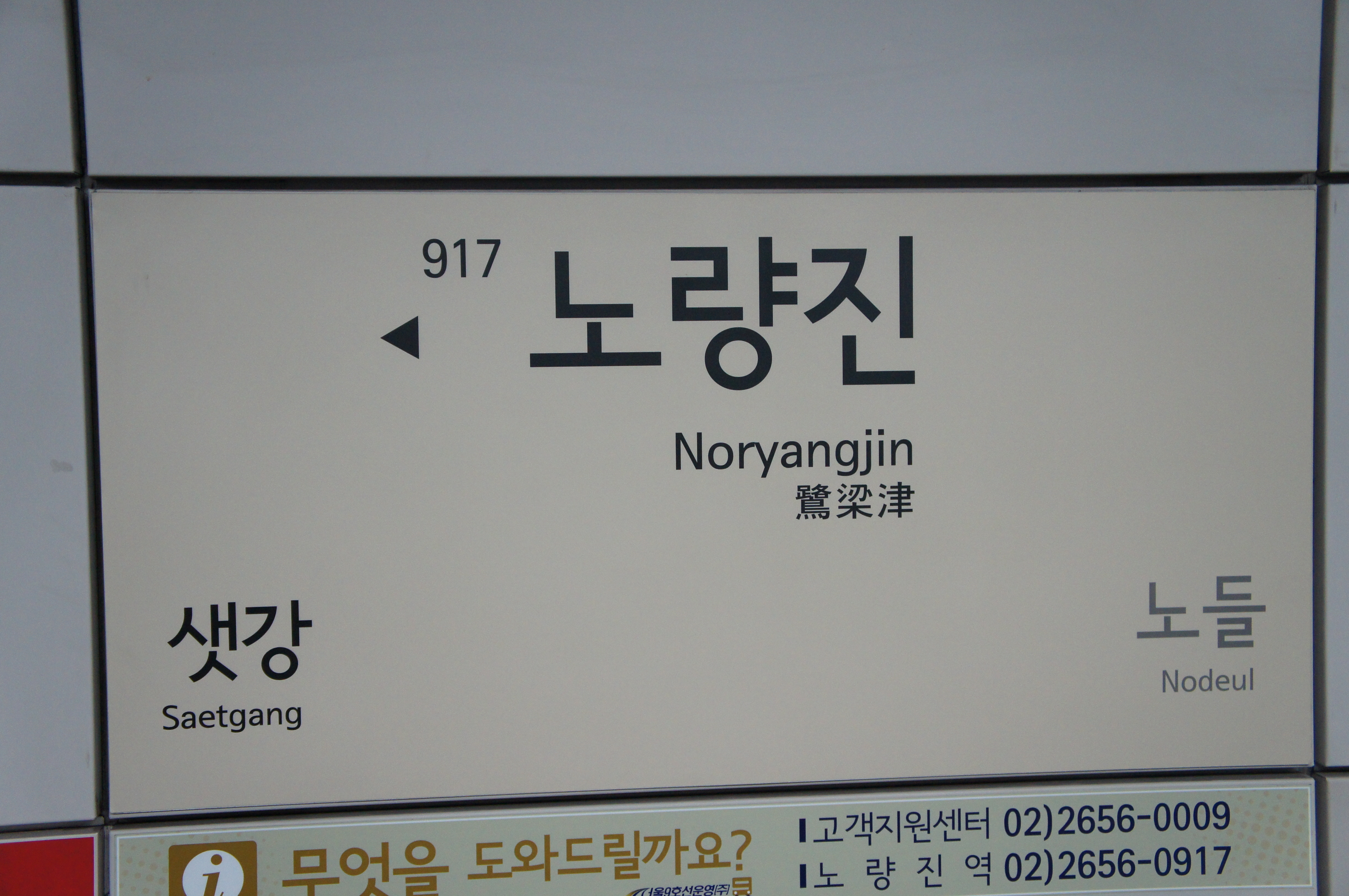
Station sign (Line 9)
