= Sindaebang-dong =

Neighborhood in Seoul, South Korea

- Country: South Korea

Area
  - Total: 1.65 km^{2} (0.64 sq mi)

Population (2001)
  - Total: 43,900
  - Density: 26,606/km^{2} (68,910/sq mi)

Korean name
- Hangul: 신대방동
- Hanja: 新大方洞
- RR: Sindaebang-dong
- MR: Sindaebang-dong

Sindaebang-dong (Korean: 신대방동) is a dong (neighbourhood) of Dongjak District, Seoul, South Korea.

== See also ==
- Administrative divisions of South Korea
