= Saetgang station =

Metro station in Seoul, South Korea

샛강 (KB금융타운); Saetgang (KB Financial Town)
S401
샛강
Saetgang
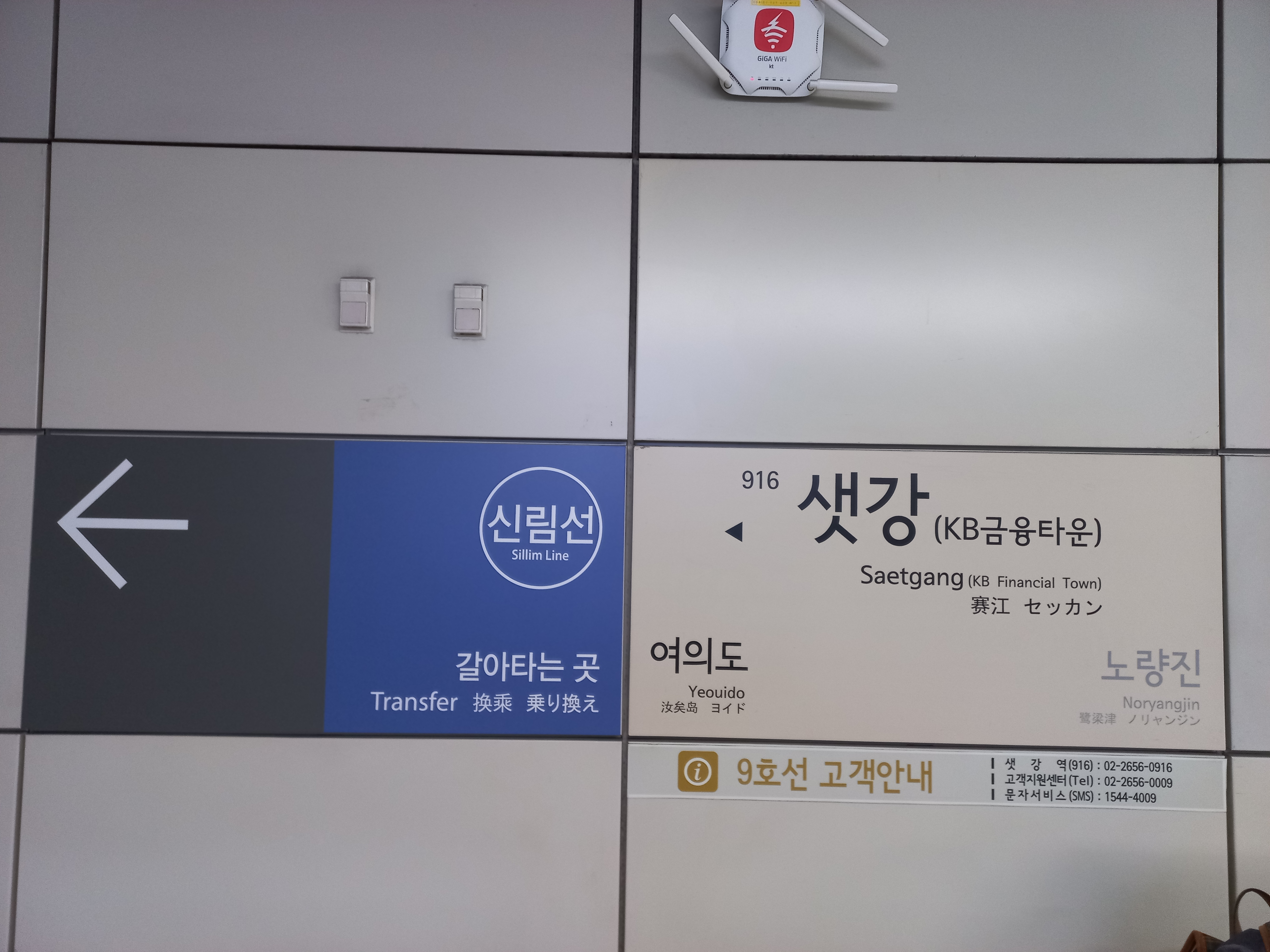
- Line 9 station name platform sign

Korean name
- Hangul: 샛강역
- Revised Romanization: Saetgang-yeok
- McCune–Reischauer: Saetkang-yŏk

General information
- Location: 56 Yeouido-dong; Yeongdeungpo-gu, Seoul
- Coordinates: 37°31′03″N 126°55′41″E
- Operator: Seoul Metro Line 9 Corporation; South Seoul LRT Co., Ltd.
- Lines: Line 9 Sillim Line
- Platforms: 4 side platforms
- Tracks: 6 (2 bypass tracks, Line 9)

Construction
- Structure type: Underground

History
- Opened: July 24, 2009

Key dates
- July 24, 2009: Line 9 opened
- May 28, 2022: Sillim Line opened
Location

Saetgang Station is a railway station on Line 9 and the Sillim Line of the Seoul Subway.

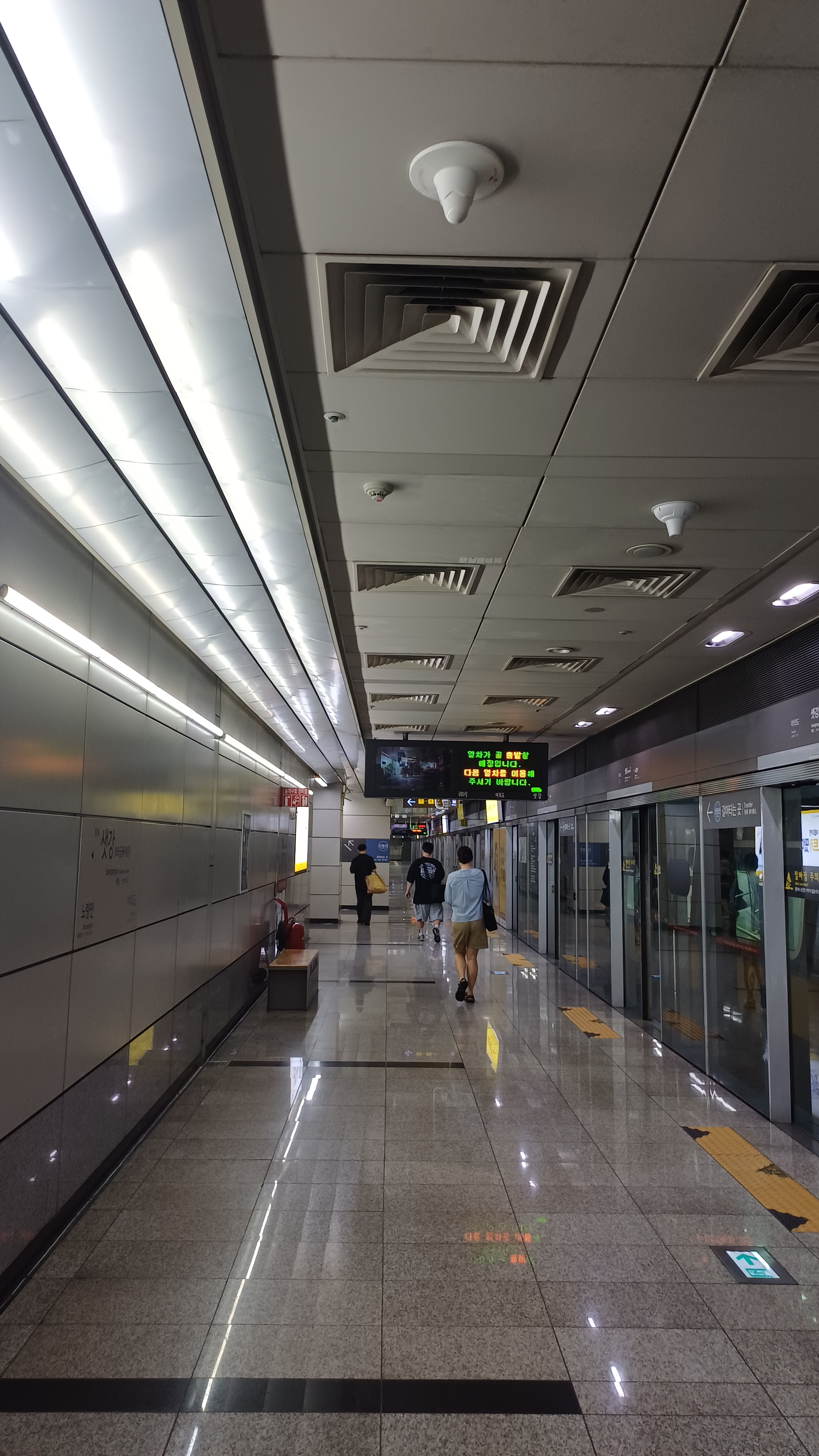
Line 9 platform

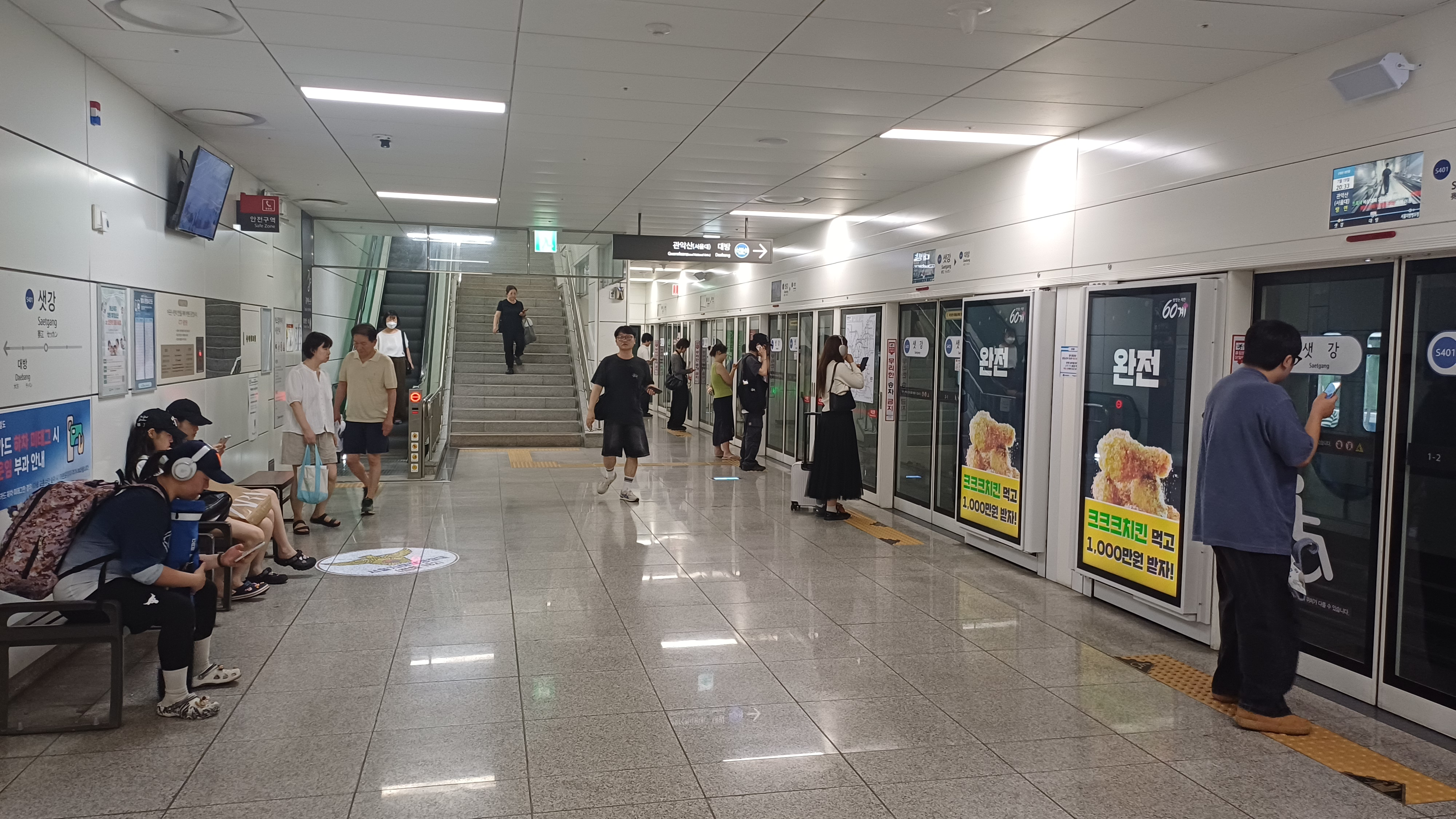
Sillim Line platform

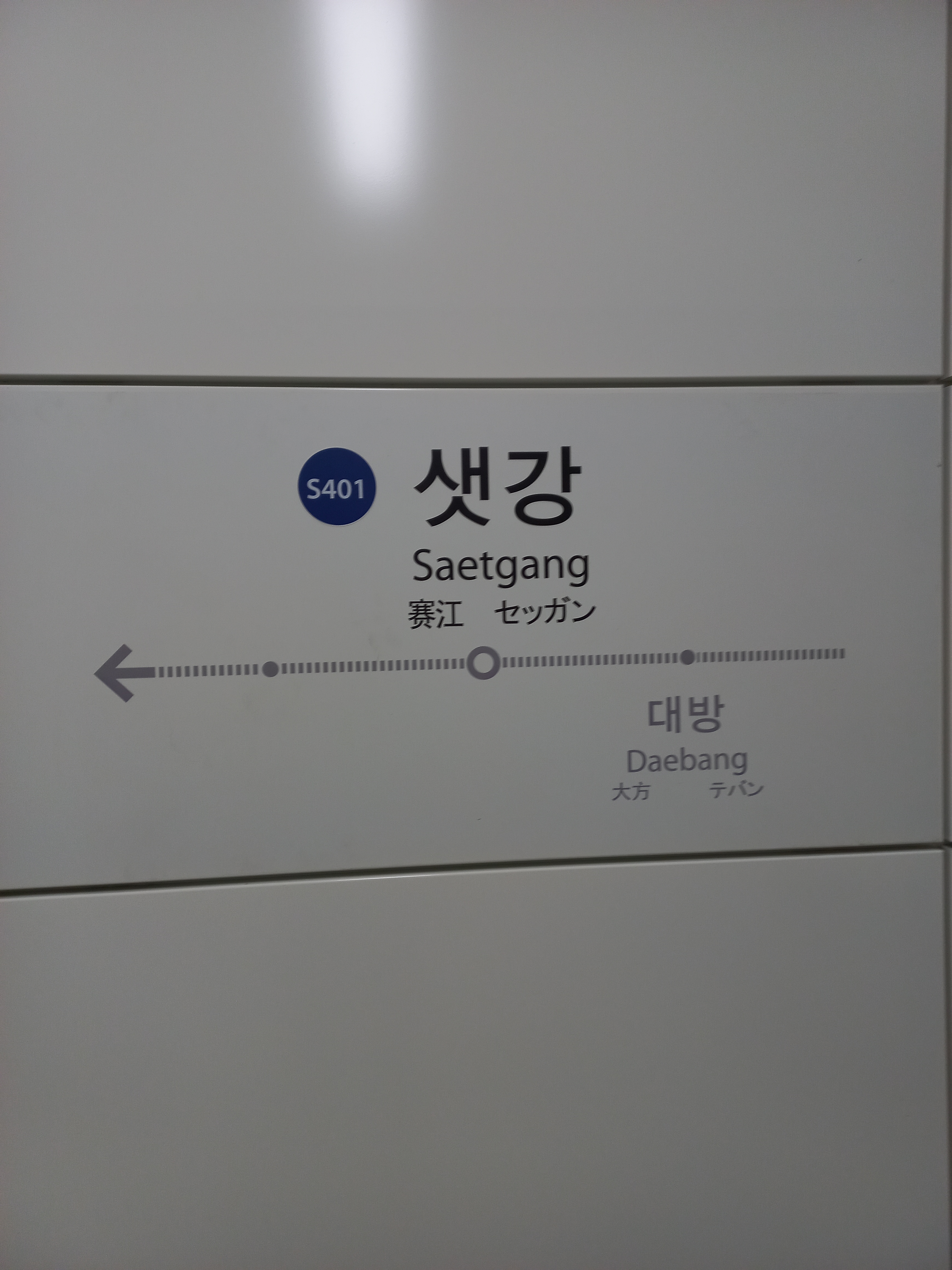
Sillim Line station name platform sign

== Station layout ==
G	Street level	Exit

L1; Concourse	Lobby	Customer Service, Shops, Vending machines, ATMs

L2; Platform level	Side platform, doors will open on the right
L2; Platform level	Westbound local	← Line 9 Local toward Gaehwa (Yeouido)
L2; Platform level	Westbound express	← Line 9 Express does not stop here
L2; Platform level	Eastbound express	Line 9 Express does not stop here →
L2; Platform level	Eastbound local	Line 9 Local toward VHS Medical Center (Noryangjin)→
L2; Platform level	Side platform, doors will open on the right

Preceding station	Seoul Metropolitan Subway	Following station
Yeouido towards Gaehwa	Line 9	Noryangjin towards VHS Medical Center
Terminus	Sillim Line	Daebang towards Gwanaksan
