= Gwanaksan station =

Metro station in Seoul, South Korea

S411 관악산 (서울대) Gwanaksan (Seoul National Univ.)
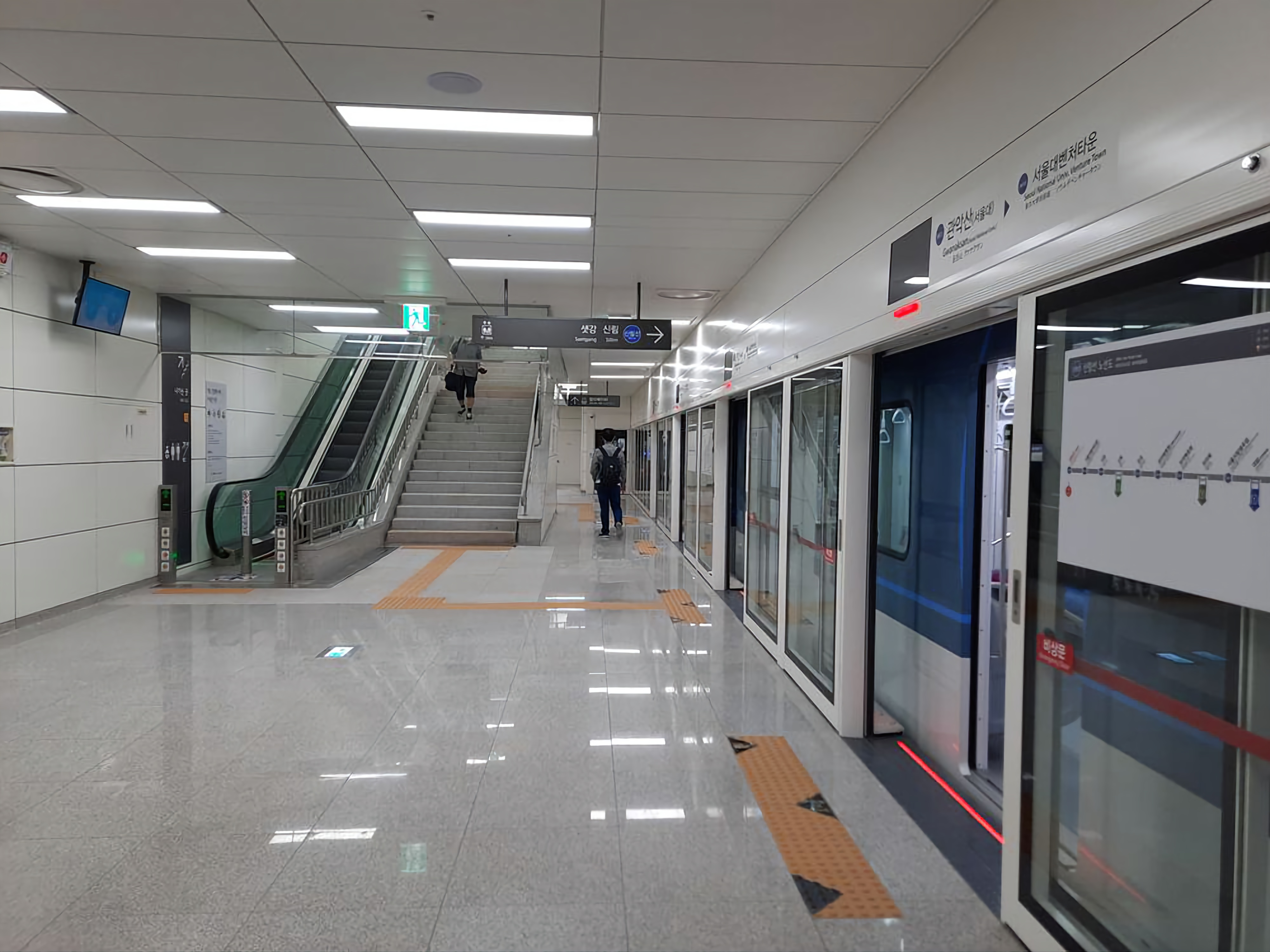
- Station platform

Korean name
- Hangul: 관악산역
- Hanja: 冠岳山驛
- Revised Romanization: Gwanaksan-yeok
- McCune–Reischauer: Kwanaksan-yŏk

General information
- Location: 211, Sillim-dong, Gwanak-gu, Seoul; South Korea
- Coordinates: 37°28′07″N 126°56′43″E
- Operator: South Seoul LRT Co., Ltd.
- Line: Sillim Line
- Platforms: 2
- Tracks: 2

Construction
- Structure type: Underground

Key dates
- May 28, 2022: Sillim Line opened
Location

Gwanaksan station (Korean: 관악산역) is a subway station on the Sillim Line in Gwanak District, Seoul. It will be a transfer station with the Seoul Light Rail West Line in the future. From this station to Saetgang station, all stations are underground. There are two late-night trains that stay at the station overnight.

== History ==
- February 7, 2021: Gwanaksan decided to be the station name
- September 16, 2021: Changed the station name to Gwanaksan (Seoul National Univ.) Station
- May 28, 2022: Opened

== Gallery ==
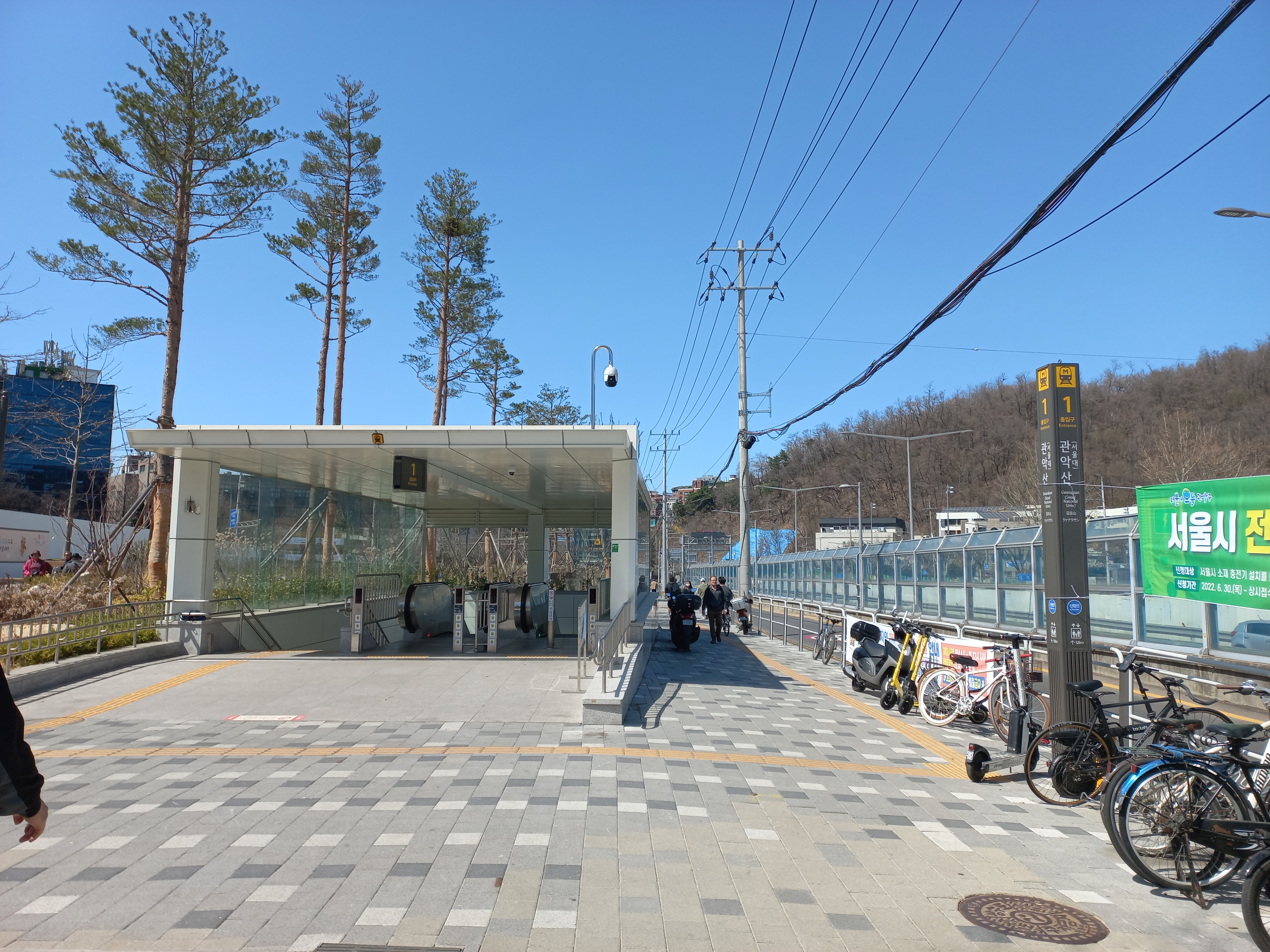
Exit 1

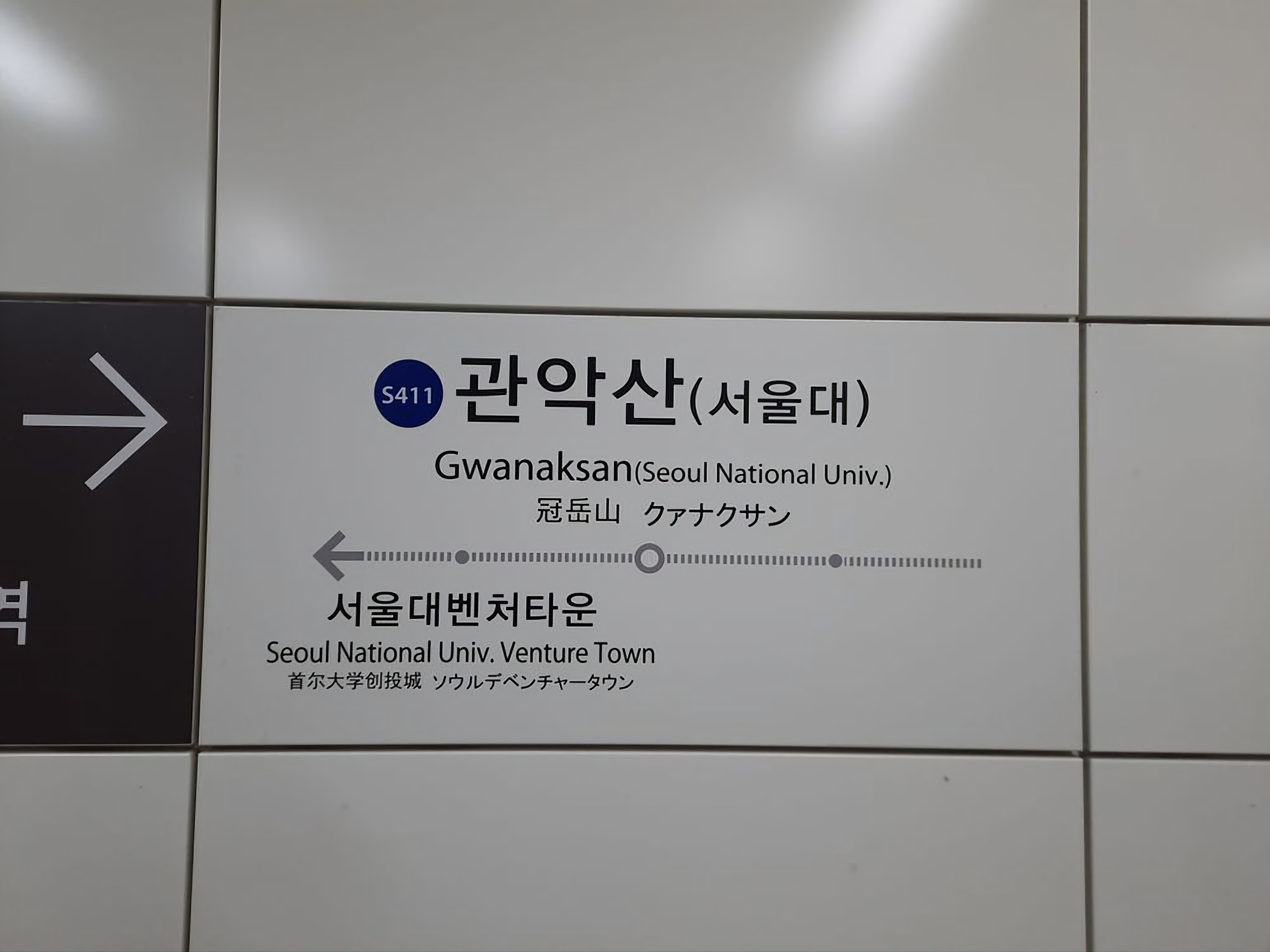
Station nameplate

== See also ==
- Gwanaksan

Preceding station	Seoul Metropolitan Subway	Following station
Seoul National University Venture Town towards Saetgang	Sillim Line	Terminus
