= List of Seoul Subway stations =

Metro stations in Seoul, South Korea

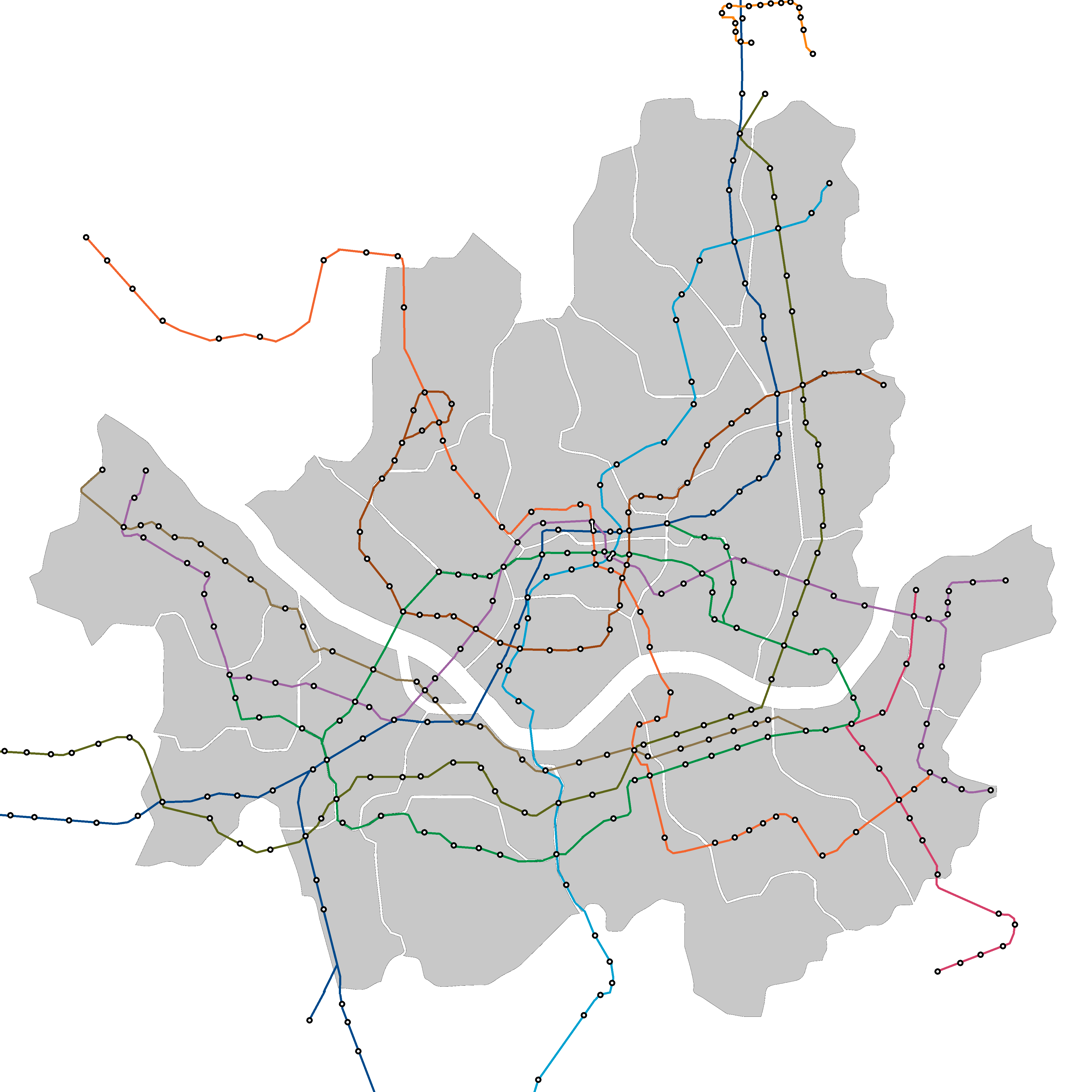
Seoul Subway lines and stations

There are currently 338 stations on the Seoul Subway network operated by Seoul Metro, Seoul Metro Line 9 Corporation and other operators. The first section to open was Line 1, which began operation on August 15, 1974, between Seoul Station and Cheongnyangni Station. As of 2025, the network extends approximately 352.8 km (219.2 mi) and consists of 11 lines; these lines extensively converge in central Seoul at Seoul Station, which serves as a major multimodal hub for the city and surrounding metropolitan area.

The Seoul subway system consists of nine heavy rail lines and several light rail lines, categorized by their operating entities: Seoul Metro, which operates Lines 1 through 8 as well as Phases 2 and 3 of Line 9; Seoul Metro Line 9 Corporation, which manages Phase 1 of Line 9; and various independent operators responsible for the city's light rail lines.

== Stations ==
=== Line 1 ===
Station number	Station name English	Station name Hangul	Station name Hanja	Transfer	Distance in km	Total distance	Location	
124	Cheongnyangni (University of Seoul)	청량리 (서울시립대입구)	淸凉里	Mugunghwa-ho, Nuriro, ITX-Saemaeul, A-Train, DMZ Train & ITX-Cheongchun services	1.4	42.9	Seoul	Dongdaemun-gu
125	Jegi-dong (Korea Association of Health Promotion)	제기동 (한국건강관리협회)	祭基洞		1.0	43.9	Seoul	Dongdaemun-gu
126	Sinseol-dong	신설동	新設洞	(Seongsu Branch)	0.9	44.8	Seoul	Dongdaemun-gu
127	Dongmyo	동묘앞	東廟앞	Seoul Subway Line 6	0.7	45.5	Seoul	Jongno-gu
128	Dongdaemun	동대문	東大門	Seoul Subway Line 4	0.6	46.1	Seoul	Jongno-gu
129	Jongno 5(o)-ga (Samyang Group)	종로5가 (삼양그룹)	鍾路5街		0.8	46.9	Seoul	Jongno-gu
130	Jongno 3(sam)-ga	종로3가	鍾路3街	Seoul Subway Line 3 Seoul Subway Line 5	0.9	47.8	Seoul	Jongno-gu
131	Jonggak (Standard Chartered Bank Korea)	종각 (SC제일은행)	鐘閣		0.8	48.6	Seoul	Jongno-gu
132	City Hall	시청	市廳	Seoul Subway Line 2	1.0	49.6	Seoul	Jung-gu
133	Seoul station	서울역	首尔驛	(Seoul Station branch) Mugunghwa-ho, ITX-Saemaeul, S-Train & DMZ Train services	1.1	50.7	Seoul	Jung-gu

=== Line 2 ===
==== Main Line ====
Station number	Station name			Connections	Distance		Location
Station number	English	Hangul	Hanja	Connections	in km	Total	Location
201	City Hall	시청	市廳	Seoul Subway Line 1	---	0.0	Jung-gu
202	Euljiro 1(il)-ga (Hana Bank)	을지로입구 (하나은행)	乙支路入口 (하나銀行)		0.7	0.7	Jung-gu
203	Euljiro 3(sam)-ga (Shinhan Card)	을지로3가 (신한카드)	乙支路三街 (新韓카드)	Seoul Subway Line 3	0.8	1.5	Jung-gu
204	Euljiro 4(sa)-ga (BC Card)	을지로4가 (BC카드)	乙支路四街 (BC카드)	Seoul Subway Line 5	0.6	2.1	Jung-gu
205	Dongdaemun History & Culture Park (DDP)	동대문역사문화공원 (DDP)	東大門歷史文化公園 (DDP)	Seoul Subway Line 4 Seoul Subway Line 5	1.0	3.1	Jung-gu
206	Sindang	신당	新堂	Seoul Subway Line 6	0.9	4.0	Jung-gu
207	Sangwangsimni	상왕십리	上往十里		0.9	4.9	Seongdong-gu
208	Wangsimni (Seongdong-gu Office)	왕십리 (성동구청)	往十里 (城東區廳)	Gyeongui–Jungang Line Suin–Bundang Line	0.8	5.7	Seongdong-gu
209	Hanyang Univ.	한양대	漢陽大		1.0	6.7	Seongdong-gu
210	Ttukseom	뚝섬	뚝섬		1.1	7.8	Seongdong-gu
211	Seongsu	성수	聖水	(Seongsu branch)	0.8	8.6	Seongdong-gu
212	Konkuk Univ.	건대입구	建大入口	Seoul Subway Line 7	1.2	9.8	Gwangjin-gu
213	Guui (Gwangjin-gu Office)	구의 (광진구청)	九宜 (廣津區廳)		1.6	11.4	Gwangjin-gu
214	Gangbyeon (Dongseoul Bus Terminal)	강변 (동서울터미널)	江邊 (東서울터미널)		0.9	12.3	Gwangjin-gu
215	Jamsillaru (Suhyup Insurance)	잠실나루 (수협중앙회공제보험)	蠶室나루 (水協中央會控除保險)		1.8	14.1	Songpa-gu
216	Jamsil (Songpa-gu Office)	잠실 (송파구청)	蠶室 (松坡區廳)	Seoul Subway Line 8	1.0	15.1	Songpa-gu
217	Jamsilsaenae	잠실새내	蠶室새내		1.2	16.3	Songpa-gu
218	Sports Complex	종합운동장	綜合運動場	Seoul Subway Line 9	1.2	17.5	Songpa-gu
219	Samseong (World Trade Center Seoul)	삼성 (무역센터)	三成 (貿易센터)		1.0	18.5	Gangnam-gu
220	Seolleung (Acuon Savings Bank)	선릉 (애큐온저축은행)	宣陵 (애큐온貯蓄銀行)	Suin–Bundang Line	1.3	19.8	Gangnam-gu
221	Yeoksam (Centerfield)	역삼 (센터필드)	驛三 (센터필드)		1.2	21.0	Gangnam-gu
222	Gangnam	강남	江南	Shinbundang Line	0.8	21.8	Gangnam-gu
223	Seoul National University of Education (Court & Prosecutors' Office)	교대 (법원·검찰청)	敎大 (法院·檢察廳)	Seoul Subway Line 3	1.2	23.0	Seocho-gu
224	Seocho	서초	瑞草		0.7	23.7	Seocho-gu
225	Bangbae (Baekseok Arts Univ.)	방배 (백석예술대)	方背 (白石藝術大)		1.7	25.4	Seocho-gu
226	Sadang	사당	舍堂	Seoul Subway Line 4	1.6	27.0	Dongjak-gu
227	Nakseongdae (Ganggamchan)	낙성대 (강감찬)	落星垈 (姜邯贊)		1.7	28.7	Gwanak-gu
228	Seoul National University (Gwanak-gu Office)	서울대입구 (관악구청)	서울大入口 (冠岳區廳)		1.0	29.7	Gwanak-gu
229	Bongcheon	봉천	奉天		1.0	30.7	Gwanak-gu
230	Sillim (Yangji Hospital)	신림 (양지병원)	新林 (陽地病院)	Sillim Line	1.1	31.8	Gwanak-gu
231	Sindaebang	신대방	新大方		1.8	33.6	Dongjak-gu
232	Guro Digital Complex (Wonkwang Digital Univ.)	구로디지털단지 (원광디지털대)	九老디지털團地 (圓光디지털大)		1.1	34.7	Guro-gu
233	Daerim (Guro-gu Office)	대림 (구로구청)	大林 (九老區廳)	Seoul Subway Line 7	1.1	35.8	Guro-gu
234	Sindorim	신도림	新道林	(Sinjeong branch)	1.8	37.6	Guro-gu
235	Mullae (Kim's Eye Hospital)	문래 (김안과병원)	文來 (金眼科病院)		1.2	38.8	Yeongdeungpo-gu
236	Yeongdeungpo-gu Office	영등포구청	永登浦區廳	Seoul Subway Line 5	0.9	39.7	Yeongdeungpo-gu
237	Dangsan	당산	堂山	Seoul Subway Line 9	1.1	40.8	Yeongdeungpo-gu
238	Hapjeong (Holt Children's Services, Inc)	합정 (홀트아동복지회)	合井 (홀트兒童福祉會)	Seoul Subway Line 6	2.0	42.8	Mapo-gu
239	Hongik Univ. (Eduwill Academy)	홍대입구 (에듀윌학원)	弘大入口 (에듀윌學院)	Gyeongui–Jungang Line	1.1	43.9	Mapo-gu
240	Sinchon	신촌 (지하)	新村		1.3	45.2	Mapo-gu
241	Ewha Womans Univ.	이대	梨大		0.8	46.0	Mapo-gu
242	Ahyeon	아현	阿峴		0.9	46.9	Mapo-gu
243	Chungjeongno (Kyonggi Univ.)	충정로 (경기대입구)	忠正路 (京畿大入口)	Seoul Subway Line 5	0.8	47.7	Seodaemun-gu

==== Seongsu Branch ====
Station number	Station name			Connections	Distance		Location
Station number	English	Hangul	Hanja	Connections	in km	Total	Location
211	Seongsu	성수	聖水	(Main Line)	---	0.0	Seongdong-gu
211-1	Yongdap	용답	龍踏		2.3	2.3	Seongdong-gu
211-2	Sindap	신답	新踏		1.0	3.3	Seongdong-gu
211-3	Yongdu (Dongdaemun-gu Office)	용두 (동대문구청)	龍頭 (東大門區廳)		0.9	4.2	Dongdaemun-gu
211-4	Sinseol-dong	신설동	新設洞	Ui LRT	1.2	5.4	Dongdaemun-gu

==== Sinjeong Branch ====
Station number	Station name			Connections	Distance		Location
Station number	English	Hangul	Hanja	Connections	in km	Total	Location
234	Sindorim	신도림	新道林	(Main Line)	---	0.0	Guro-gu
234-1	Dorimcheon	도림천	道林川		1.0	1.0	Guro-gu
234-2	Yangcheon-gu Office	양천구청	陽川區廳		1.7	2.7	Yangcheon-gu
234-3	Sinjeongnegeori	신정네거리	新亭네거리		1.9	4.6	Yangcheon-gu
234-4	Kkachisan	까치산	까치山	Seoul Subway Line 5	1.4	6.0	Gangseo-gu

=== Line 3 ===
Station number	Station name English	Station name Hangul	Station name Hanja	Transfer	Distance in km	Total distance	Location	
319	Jichuk	지축	紙杻		1.7	19.2		
320	Gupabal (Eunpyeong St. Mary's Hospital)	구파발 (은평성모병원)	舊把撥		1.5	20.7	Seoul	Eunpyeong-gu
321	Yeonsinnae	연신내	연신내	Great Train eXpress	2.0	22.7	Seoul	Eunpyeong-gu
322	Bulgwang	불광	佛光	Seoul Subway Line 6	1.3	24.0	Seoul	Eunpyeong-gu
323	Nokbeon	녹번	碌磻		1.1	25.1	Seoul	Eunpyeong-gu
324	Hongje	홍제	弘濟		1.6	26.7	Seoul	Seodaemun-gu
325	Muakjae	무악재	毋岳재		0.9	27.6	Seoul	Seodaemun-gu
326	Dongnimmun	독립문	獨立門		1.1	28.7	Seoul	Seodaemun-gu
327	Gyeongbokgung (Government Complex-Seoul)	경복궁 (정부서울청사)	景福宮		1.6	30.3	Seoul	Jongno-gu
328	Anguk (Hyundai E & C)	안국 (현대건설)	安國		1.1	31.4	Seoul	Jongno-gu
329	Jongno 3(sam)-ga	종로3가	鍾路3街	Seoul Subway Line 1 Seoul Subway Line 5	1.0	32.4	Seoul	Jongno-gu
330	Euljiro 3(sam)-ga (Shinhan Card)	을지로3가 (신한카드)	乙支路3街	Seoul Subway Line 2	0.6	33.0	Seoul	Jung-gu
331	Chungmuro	충무로	忠武路	Seoul Subway Line 4	0.7	33.7	Seoul	Jung-gu
332	Dongguk Univ.	동대입구	東大入口		0.9	34.6	Seoul	Jung-gu
333	Yaksu	약수	藥水	Seoul Subway Line 6	0.7	35.3	Seoul	Jung-gu
334	Geumho	금호	金湖		0.8	36.1	Seoul	Seongdong-gu
335	Oksu	옥수	玉水	Gyeongui–Jungang Line	0.8	36.9	Seoul	Seongdong-gu
336	Apgujeong (Hyundai Department Store)	압구정 (현대백화점)	狎鷗亭		2.1	39.0	Seoul	Gangnam-gu
337	Sinsa	신사	新沙	Shinbundang Line	1.5	40.5	Seoul	Gangnam-gu
338	Jamwon	잠원	蠶院		0.9	41.4	Seoul	Seocho-gu
339	Express Bus Terminal	고속터미널	高速터미널	Seoul Subway Line 7 Seoul Subway Line 9	1.2	42.6	Seoul	Seocho-gu
340	Seoul Nat'l Univ. of Education (Court & Prosecutors' Office)	교대 (법원·검찰청)	敎大	Seoul Subway Line 2	1.6	44.2	Seoul	Seocho-gu
341	Nambu Bus Terminal (Seoul Arts Center)	남부터미널 (예술의전당)	南部터미널		0.9	45.1	Seoul	Seocho-gu
342	Yangjae (Seocho-gu Office)	양재 (서초구청)	良才	Shinbundang Line	1.8	46.9	Seoul	Seocho-gu
343	Maebong	매봉	매봉		1.2	48.1	Seoul	Gangnam-gu
344	Dogok	도곡	道谷	Suin–Bundang Line	0.8	48.9	Seoul	Gangnam-gu
345	Daechi	대치	大峙		0.8	49.7	Seoul	Gangnam-gu
346	Hangnyeoul	학여울	학여울		0.8	50.5	Seoul	Gangnam-gu
347	Daecheong (SH Corporation)	대청 (서울주택도시공사)	대청		0.9	51.4	Seoul	Gangnam-gu
348	Irwon	일원	逸院		1.2	52.6	Seoul	Gangnam-gu
349	Suseo	수서	水西	Suin–Bundang Line Great Train eXpress	1.8	54.4	Seoul	Gangnam-gu
350	Garak Market	가락시장	可樂市場	Seoul Subway Line 8	1.2	55.6	Seoul	Songpa-gu
351	National Police Hospital	경찰병원	警察病院		0.8	56.4	Seoul	Songpa-gu
352	Ogeum	오금	梧琴	Seoul Subway Line 5	0.6	57.0	Seoul	Songpa-gu

=== Line 4 ===
Station number	Station name English	Station name Hangul	Station name Hanja	EX	Transfer	Line name	Distance in km	Total distance	Location	
409	Buramsan	불암산	佛巖山	Makes all stops		Seoul Metro Line 4	4.4	14.3	Seoul	Nowon-gu
410	Sanggye	상계	上溪	Makes all stops		Seoul Metro Line 4	1.2	15.5	Seoul	Nowon-gu
411	Nowon	노원	蘆原	Makes all stops	Seoul Subway Line 7	Seoul Metro Line 4	1.0	16.5	Seoul	Nowon-gu
412	Chang-dong	창동	倉洞	Makes all stops	Seoul Subway Line 1	Seoul Metro Line 4	1.4	17.9	Seoul	Dobong-gu
413	Ssangmun	쌍문	雙門	Makes all stops		Seoul Metro Line 4	1.3	19.2	Seoul	Dobong-gu
414	Suyu (Gangbuk-gu Office)	수유 (강북구청)	水踰	Makes all stops		Seoul Metro Line 4	1.5	20.7	Seoul	Gangbuk-gu
415	Mia (Seoul Cyber Univ.)	미아 (서울사이버대학)	彌阿	Makes all stops		Seoul Metro Line 4	1.4	22.1	Seoul	Gangbuk-gu
416	Miasageori	미아사거리	彌阿四거리	Makes all stops		Seoul Metro Line 4	1.5	23.6	Seoul	Gangbuk-gu
417	Gireum	길음	吉音	Makes all stops		Seoul Metro Line 4	1.3	24.9	Seoul	Seongbuk-gu
418	Sungshin Women's Univ. (Donam)	성신여대입구 (돈암)	誠信女大入口	Makes all stops	Ui LRT	Seoul Metro Line 4	1.4	26.3	Seoul	Seongbuk-gu
419	Hansung Univ. (Samseongyo)	한성대입구 (삼선교)	漢城大入口	Makes all stops		Seoul Metro Line 4	1.0	27.3	Seoul	Seongbuk-gu
420	Hyehwa (Seoul Nat’l Univ. Hospital)	혜화 (서울대학교병원)	惠化	Makes all stops		Seoul Metro Line 4	0.9	28.2	Seoul	Jongno-gu
421	Dongdaemun	동대문	東大門	Makes all stops	Seoul Subway Line 1	Seoul Metro Line 4	1.5	29.7	Seoul	Jongno-gu
422	Dongdaemun History & Culture Park (DDP)	동대문역사문화공원 (DDP)	東大門歷史文化公園	Makes all stops	Seoul Subway Line 2 Seoul Subway Line 5	Seoul Metro Line 4	0.7	30.4	Seoul	Jung-gu
423	Chungmuro	충무로	忠武路	Makes all stops	Seoul Subway Line 3	Seoul Metro Line 4	1.3	31.7	Seoul	Jung-gu
424	Myeong-dong (Woori Financial Town)	명동 (우리금융타운)	明洞	Makes all stops		Seoul Metro Line 4	0.7	32.4	Seoul	Jung-gu
425	Hoehyeon (Namdaemun Market)	회현 (남대문시장)	會賢	Makes all stops		Seoul Metro Line 4	0.7	33.1	Seoul	Jung-gu
426	Seoul Station	서울역	서울驛	Makes all stops	(Seoul Station branch) Mugunghwa-ho and ITX-Saemaeul services	Seoul Metro Line 4	0.9	34.0	Seoul	Yongsan-gu
427	Sookmyung Women's Univ. (Garwol)	숙대입구 (갈월)	淑大入口	Makes all stops		Seoul Metro Line 4	1.0	35.0	Seoul	Yongsan-gu
428	Samgakji	삼각지	三角地	Makes all stops	Seoul Subway Line 6	Seoul Metro Line 4	1.2	36.2	Seoul	Yongsan-gu
429	Sinyongsan (AMOREPACIFIC)	신용산 (아모레퍼시픽)	新龍山	Makes all stops		Seoul Metro Line 4	0.7	36.9	Seoul	Yongsan-gu
430	Ichon (National Museum of Korea)	이촌 (국립중앙박물관)	二村	Makes all stops	Gyeongui–Jungang Line	Seoul Metro Line 4	1.3	38.2	Seoul	Yongsan-gu
431	Dongjak (Seoul National Cemetery)	동작 (현충원)	銅雀	Makes all stops	Seoul Subway Line 9	Seoul Metro Line 4	2.7	40.9	Seoul	Dongjak-gu
432	Chongshin Univ. (Isu)	총신대입구 (이수)	總神大入口	Makes all stops	Seoul Subway Line 7	Seoul Metro Line 4	1.8	42.7	Seoul	Dongjak-gu
433	Sadang	사당	舍堂	Makes all stops	Seoul Subway Line 2	Seoul Metro Line 4	1.1	43.8	Seoul	Dongjak-gu
434	Namtaeryeong	남태령	南泰嶺	Makes all stops		Seoul Metro Line 4	1.6	45.4	Seoul	Seocho-gu

=== Line 5 ===
==== Main Line ====
Station Number	Station Name English	Station Name Hangul	Station Name Hanja	Transfer	Distance in km	Total Distance	Location	
510	Banghwa	방화	傍花		---	0.0	Seoul	Gangseo-gu
511	Gaehwasan	개화산	開花山		0.9	0.9	Seoul	Gangseo-gu
512	Gimpo Int'l Airport	김포공항	金浦空港	Gimpo Goldline Seohae Line	1.2	2.1	Seoul	Gangseo-gu
513	Songjeong	송정	松亭		1.2	3.3	Seoul	Gangseo-gu
514	Magok (Home & Shopping)	마곡 (홈앤쇼핑)	麻谷		1.1	4.4	Seoul	Gangseo-gu
515	Balsan	발산	鉢山		1.2	5.6	Seoul	Gangseo-gu
516	Ujangsan	우장산	雨裝山		1.1	6.7	Seoul	Gangseo-gu
517	Hwagok	화곡	禾谷		1.0	7.7	Seoul	Gangseo-gu
518	Kkachisan	까치산	까치山	(Sinjeong branch)	1.2	8.9	Seoul	Gangseo-gu
519	Sinjeong (Eunhaengjeong)	신정 (은행정)	新亭		1.3	10.2	Seoul	Yangcheon-gu
520	Mok-dong	목동	木洞		0.8	11.0	Seoul	Yangcheon-gu
521	Omokgyo (Mokdong Stadium)	오목교 (목동운동장앞)	梧木橋		0.9	11.9	Seoul	Yangcheon-gu
522	Yangpyeong	양평	楊坪		1.1	13.0	Seoul	Yeongdeungpo-gu
523	Yeongdeungpo-gu Office	영등포구청	永登浦區廳	Seoul Subway Line 2	0.8	13.8	Seoul	Yeongdeungpo-gu
524	Yeongdeungpo Market	영등포시장	永登浦市場		0.9	14.7	Seoul	Yeongdeungpo-gu
525	Singil	신길	新吉	Seoul Subway Line 1	1.1	15.8	Seoul	Yeongdeungpo-gu
526	Yeouido	여의도	汝矣島	Seoul Subway Line 9	1.0	16.8	Seoul	Yeongdeungpo-gu
527	Yeouinaru	여의나루	汝矣나루		1.0	17.8	Seoul	Yeongdeungpo-gu
528	Mapo	마포	麻浦		1.8	19.6	Seoul	Mapo-gu
529	Gongdeok	공덕	孔德	Gyeongui–Jungang Line	0.8	20.4	Seoul	Mapo-gu
530	Aeogae	애오개	애오개		1.1	21.5	Seoul	Mapo-gu
531	Chungjeongno (Kyonggi Univ.)	충정로 (경기대입구)	忠正路	Seoul Subway Line 2	0.9	22.4	Seoul	Seodaemun-gu
532	Seodaemun (Kangbuk Samsung Hospital)	서대문 (강북삼성병원)	西大門		0.7	23.1	Seoul	Jongno-gu
533	Gwanghwamun (Sejong Center for the Performing Arts)	광화문 (세종문화회관)	光化門		1.1	24.2	Seoul	Jongno-gu
534	Jongno 3(sam)-ga (Tapgol Park)	종로3가 (탑골공원)	鍾路3街	Seoul Subway Line 1 Seoul Subway Line 3	1.2	25.4	Seoul	Jongno-gu
535	Euljiro 4(sa)-ga (BC Card)	을지로4가 (BC카드)	乙支路4街	Seoul Subway Line 2	1.0	26.4	Seoul	Jung-gu
536	Dongdaemun History & Culture Park (DDP)	동대문역사문화공원 (DDP)	東大門歷史文化公園	Seoul Subway Line 2 Seoul Subway Line 4	0.9	27.3	Seoul	Jung-gu
537	Cheonggu	청구	靑丘	Seoul Subway Line 6	0.9	28.2	Seoul	Jung-gu
538	Singeumho	신금호	新金湖		0.9	29.1	Seoul	Seongdong-gu
539	Haengdang	행당	杏堂		0.8	29.9	Seoul	Seongdong-gu
540	Wangsimni (Seongdong-gu Office)	왕십리 (성동구청)	往十里	Gyeongui–Jungang Line Suin–Bundang Line	0.9	30.8	Seoul	Seongdong-gu
541	Majang	마장	馬場		0.7	31.5	Seoul	Seongdong-gu
542	Dapsimni	답십리	踏十里		1.0	32.5	Seoul	Dongdaemun-gu
543	Janghanpyeong	장한평	長漢坪		1.2	33.7	Seoul	Dongdaemun-gu
544	Gunja (Neung-dong)	군자 (능동)	君子	Seoul Subway Line 7	1.5	35.2	Seoul	Gwangjin-gu
545	Achasan (Rear Entrance to Seoul Children's Grand Park)	아차산 (어린이대공원후문)	峨嵯山		1.0	36.2	Seoul	Gwangjin-gu
546	Gwangnaru (Presbyterian Univ. & Theological Seminary)	광나루 (장신대)	광나루		1.5	37.7	Seoul	Gwangjin-gu
547	Cheonho (Pungnaptoseong)	천호 (풍납토성)	千戶	Seoul Subway Line 8	2.0	39.7	Seoul	Gangdong-gu
548	Gangdong (Kangdong Sacred Heart Hospital)	강동 (강동성심병원)	江東	(for Macheon)	0.8	40.5	Seoul	Gangdong-gu
549	Gil-dong	길동	吉洞		0.9	41.4	Seoul	Gangdong-gu
550	Gubeundari (Gangdong Community Center)	굽은다리 (강동구민회관앞)	굽은다리		0.8	42.2	Seoul	Gangdong-gu
551	Myeongil	명일	明逸		0.7	42.9	Seoul	Gangdong-gu
552	Godeok (Kyung Hee Univ. Hospital at Gangdong)	고덕 (강동경희대병원)	高德	Seoul Subway Line 9	1.2	44.1	Seoul	Gangdong-gu
553	Sangil-dong	상일동	上一洞		1.1	45.2	Seoul	Gangdong-gu

==== Macheon Branch ====
Station Number	Station Name English	Station Name Hangul	Station Name Hanja	Transfer	Distance in km	Total Distance	Location	
548	Gangdong (Kangdong Sacred Heart Hospital)	강동 (강동성심병원)	江東	(for Hanam Geomdansan)	0.8	40.5	Seoul	Gangdong-gu
P549	Dunchon-dong	둔촌동	遁村洞		1.2	41.7	Seoul	Gangdong-gu
P550	Olympic Park (Korea National Sport Univ.)	올림픽공원 (한국체대)	奥林匹克公园	Seoul Subway Line 9	1.4	43.1	Seoul	Songpa-gu
P551	Bangi	방이	芳荑		0.9	44.0	Seoul	Songpa-gu
P552	Ogeum	오금	梧琴	Seoul Subway Line 3	0.9	44.9	Seoul	Songpa-gu
P553	Gaerong	개롱	開籠		0.9	45.8	Seoul	Songpa-gu
P554	Geoyeo	거여	巨余		0.9	46.7	Seoul	Songpa-gu
P555	Macheon	마천	馬川		0.9	47.6	Seoul	Songpa-gu

=== Line 6 ===
Station Number	Station Name English	Station Name Hangul	Station Name Hanja	Transfer	Line Name	Distance in km	Total Distance	Location
610	Eungam	응암	鷹岩		Eungam loop of Line 6	---	0.0	Eunpyeong-gu
611	Yeokchon	역촌	驛村		Eungam loop of Line 6	1.1	1.1	Eunpyeong-gu
612	Bulgwang	불광	佛光	Seoul Subway Line 3	Eungam loop of Line 6	0.8	1.9	Eunpyeong-gu
613	Dokbawi	독바위	독바위		Eungam loop of Line 6	0.9	2.8	Eunpyeong-gu
614	Yeonsinnae	연신내	연신내	Seoul Subway Line 3	Eungam loop of Line 6	1.4	4.2	Eunpyeong-gu
615	Gusan	구산	龜山		Eungam loop of Line 6	0.9	5.1	Eunpyeong-gu
610	Eungam	응암	鷹岩		Eungam loop of Line 6	1.5	6.6	Eunpyeong-gu
616	Saejeol (Sinsa)	새절 (신사)	새절		Line 6	0.9	7.5	Eunpyeong-gu
617	Jeungsan (Myongji University)	증산 (명지대앞)	繒山		Line 6	0.9	8.4	Eunpyeong-gu
618	Digital Media City	디지털미디어시티	디지털미디어시티	Gyeongui–Jungang Line	Line 6	1.1	9.5	Eunpyeong-gu
619	World Cup Stadium (Seongsan)	월드컵경기장 (성산)	월드컵競技場		Line 6	0.8	10.3	Mapo-gu
620	Mapo-gu Office	마포구청	麻浦區廳		Line 6	0.8	11.1	Mapo-gu
621	Mangwon	망원	望遠		Line 6	1.0	12.1	Mapo-gu
622	Hapjeong (Holt Children's Services Inc.)	합정 (홀트아동복지회)	合井	Seoul Subway Line 2	Line 6	0.8	12.9	Mapo-gu
623	Sangsu	상수	上水		Line 6	0.8	13.7	Mapo-gu
624	Gwangheungchang (Seogang)	광흥창 (서강)	廣興倉		Line 6	0.9	14.6	Mapo-gu
625	Daeheung (Sogang University)	대흥 (서강대앞)	大興		Line 6	1.0	15.6	Mapo-gu
626	Gongdeok	공덕	孔德	Gyeongui–Jungang Line	Line 6	0.9	16.5	Mapo-gu
627	Hyochang Park	효창공원앞	孝昌公園앞	Gyeongui–Jungang Line	Line 6	0.9	17.4	Yongsan-gu
628	Samgakji	삼각지	三角地	Seoul Subway Line 4	Line 6	1.2	18.6	Yongsan-gu
629	Noksapyeong (Yongsan-gu Office)	녹사평 (용산구청)	綠莎坪		Line 6	1.1	19.7	Yongsan-gu
630	Itaewon	이태원	梨泰院		Line 6	0.8	20.5	Yongsan-gu
631	Hangangjin	한강진	漢江鎭		Line 6	1.0	21.5	Yongsan-gu
632	Beotigogae	버티고개	버티고개		Line 6	1.0	22.5	Jung-gu
633	Yaksu	약수	藥水	Seoul Subway Line 3	Line 6	0.7	23.2	Jung-gu
634	Cheonggu	청구	靑丘	Seoul Subway Line 5	Line 6	0.8	24.0	Jung-gu
635	Sindang	신당	新堂	Seoul Subway Line 2	Line 6	0.7	24.7	Jung-gu
636	Dongmyo	동묘앞	東廟앞	Seoul Subway Line 1	Line 6	0.6	25.3	Jongno-gu
637	Changsin	창신	昌信		Line 6	0.9	26.2	Jongno-gu
638	Bomun	보문	普門	Ui LRT	Line 6	0.8	27.0	Seongbuk-gu
639	Anam (Korea Univ. Hospital)	안암 (고대병원앞)	安岩		Line 6	0.9	27.9	Seongbuk-gu
640	Korea University (Jongam)	고려대 (종암)	高麗大		Line 6	0.8	28.7	Seongbuk-gu
641	Wolgok (Dongduk Women's University)	월곡 (동덕여대)	月谷		Line 6	1.4	30.1	Seongbuk-gu
642	Sangwolgok (KIST)	상월곡 (한국과학기술연구원)	上月谷		Line 6	0.8	30.9	Seongbuk-gu
643	Dolgoji	돌곶이	돌곶이		Line 6	0.8	31.7	Seongbuk-gu
644	Seokgye	석계	石溪	Seoul Subway Line 1	Line 6	1.0	32.7	Nowon-gu
645	Taereung	태릉입구	泰陵入口	Seoul Subway Line 7	Line 6	0.8	33.5	Nowon-gu
646	Hwarangdae (Seoul Women's Univ.)	화랑대 (서울여대입구)	花郞臺		Line 6	0.9	34.4	Nowon-gu
647	Bonghwasan (Seoul Medical Center)	봉화산 (서울의료원)	烽火山		Line 6	0.7	35.1	Jungnang-gu
648	Sinnae	신내	新內	Gyeongchun Line	Line 6	1.3	36.4	Jungnang-gu

=== Line 7 ===
Station number	Station name English	Station name Hangul	Station name Hanja	Transfer	Distance in km	Total distance	Location	
709	Jangam	장암	長岩		---	0.0	Gyeonggi-do	Uijeongbu-si
710	Dobongsan	도봉산	道峰山	Seoul Subway Line 1	1.4	1.4	Seoul	Dobong-gu
711	Suraksan	수락산	水落山		1.6	3.0	Seoul	Nowon-gu
712	Madeul	마들	—		1.4	4.4	Seoul	Nowon-gu
713	Nowon	노원	蘆原	Seoul Subway Line 4	1.2	5.6	Seoul	Nowon-gu
714	Junggye (Korean Bible Univ.)	중계 (한국성서대)	中溪		1.1	6.7	Seoul	Nowon-gu
715	Hagye (Eulji Medical Center)	하계 (을지대 을지병원)	下溪		1.0	7.7	Seoul	Nowon-gu
716	Gongneung (Seoul National Univ. of Science and Technology)	공릉 (서울과학기술대)	孔陵		1.3	9.0	Seoul	Nowon-gu
717	Taereung	태릉입구	泰陵入口	Seoul Subway Line 6	0.8	9.8	Seoul	Nowon-gu
718	Meokgol	먹골	—		0.9	10.7	Seoul	Jungnang-gu
719	Junghwa	중화	中和		0.9	11.6	Seoul	Jungnang-gu
720	Sangbong (Intercity Bus Terminal)	상봉 (시외버스터미널)	上鳳	Gyeongui–Jungang Line Gyeongchun Line	1.0	12.6	Seoul	Jungnang-gu
721	Myeonmok (Seoil Univ.)	면목 (서일대입구)	面牧		0.8	13.4	Seoul	Jungnang-gu
722	Sagajeong (Green Hospital)	사가정 (녹색병원)	四佳亭		0.9	14.3	Seoul	Jungnang-gu
723	Yongmasan (Yongma Falls Park)	용마산 (용마폭포공원)	龍馬山		0.8	15.1	Seoul	Jungnang-gu
724	Junggok	중곡	中谷		0.9	16.0	Seoul	Gwangjin-gu
725	Gunja (Neung-dong)	군자 (능동)	君子	Seoul Subway Line 5	1.1	17.1	Seoul	Gwangjin-gu
726	Children's Grand Park (Sejong Univ.)	어린이대공원 (세종대)	어린이大公園		1.1	18.2	Seoul	Gwangjin-gu
727	Konkuk Univ.	건대입구	建大入口	Seoul Subway Line 2	0.8	19.0	Seoul	Gwangjin-gu
728	Jayang (Ttukseom Hangang Park)	자양 (뚝섬한강공원)	紫陽		1.0	20.0	Seoul	Gwangjin-gu
729	Cheongdam (Cheil Orthopedic Hospital)	청담 (제일정형외과병원)	淸潭		2.0	22.0	Seoul	Gangnam-gu
730	Gangnam-gu Office	강남구청	江南區廳	Suin–Bundang Line	1.1	23.1	Seoul	Gangnam-gu
731	Hak-dong (Nanoori Hospital)	학동 (나누리병원)	鶴洞		0.9	24.0	Seoul	Gangnam-gu
732	Nonhyeon (Gangnam Brand Eye Clinic)	논현 (강남브랜드안과)	論峴	Shinbundang Line	1.0	25.0	Seoul	Gangnam-gu
733	Banpo	반포	盤浦		0.9	25.9	Seoul	Seocho-gu
734	Express Bus Terminal	고속터미널	高速터미널	Seoul Subway Line 3 Seoul Subway Line 9	0.9	26.8	Seoul	Seocho-gu
735	Naebang (uJung Art Center)	내방 (유정아트센터)	內方		2.2	29.0	Seoul	Seocho-gu
736	Isu (Chongshin Univ.)	이수 (총신대입구)	梨水	Chongshin Univ. (Isu) Station	1.0	30.0	Seoul	Dongjak-gu
737	Namseong	남성	南城		1.0	31.0	Seoul	Dongjak-gu
738	Soongsil University (Salpijae)	숭실대입구 (살피재)	崇實大入口		2.0	33.0	Seoul	Dongjak-gu
739	Sangdo	상도	上道		0.9	33.9	Seoul	Dongjak-gu
740	Jangseungbaegi	장승배기	—		0.9	34.8	Seoul	Dongjak-gu
741	Sindaebangsamgeori	신대방삼거리	新大方삼거리		1.2	36.0	Seoul	Dongjak-gu
742	Boramae (Hyundai HT)	보라매 (현대에이치티)	—	Sillim Line	0.8	36.8	Seoul	Yeongdeungpo-gu
743	Sinpung	신풍	新豊		0.9	37.7	Seoul	Yeongdeungpo-gu
744	Daerim (Guro-gu Office)	대림 (구로구청)	大林	Seoul Subway Line 2	1.4	39.1	Seoul	Yeongdeungpo-gu
745	Namguro	남구로	南九老		1.1	40.2	Seoul	Guro-gu
746	Gasan Digital Complex (Mario Outlet)	가산디지털단지 (마리오아울렛)	加山디지털團地	Seoul Subway Line 1	0.8	41.0	Seoul	Geumcheon-gu
747	Cheolsan	철산	鐵山		1.4	42.4	Gyeonggi-do	Gwangmyeong-si
748	Gwangmyeongsageori	광명사거리	光明사거리		1.3	43.7	Gyeonggi-do	Gwangmyeong-si
749	Cheonwang	천왕	天旺		1.7	45.4	Seoul	Guro-gu
750	Onsu (Sungkonghoe Univ.)	온수 (성공회대입구)	溫水	Seoul Subway Line 1	1.5	46.9	Seoul	Guro-gu
751	Kkachiul	까치울	—		2.2	49.1	Gyeonggi-do	Bucheon-si
752	Bucheon Stadium	부천종합운동장	富川綜合運動場	Seohae Line	1.2	50.3	Gyeonggi-do	Bucheon-si
753	Chunui	춘의	春衣		0.9	51.2	Gyeonggi-do	Bucheon-si
754	Sinjung-dong	신중동	新中洞		1.0	52.2	Gyeonggi-do	Bucheon-si
755	Bucheon City Hall (Bucheon Arts Center)	부천시청 (부천아트센터)	富川市廳		1.1	53.3	Gyeonggi-do	Bucheon-si
756	Sang-dong	상동	上洞		0.9	54.2	Gyeonggi-do	Bucheon-si
757	Samsan Gymnasium	삼산체육관	三山體育館		1.1	55.3	Incheon	Bupyeong-gu
758	Gulpocheon	굴포천	掘浦川		0.9	56.2	Incheon	Bupyeong-gu
759	Bupyeong-gu Office (Serim General Hospital)	부평구청 (세림병원)	富平區廳	Incheon Subway Line 1	0.9	57.1	Incheon	Bupyeong-gu
760	Sangok	산곡	山谷		1.6	58.7	Incheon	Seo-gu
761	Seongnam (Geobuk Market)	석남 (거북시장)	石南	Incheon Subway Line 2	2.3	61.0	Incheon	Seo-gu

=== Line 8 ===
Station number	Station name English	Station name Hangul	Station name Hanja	Transfer	Line name	Distance in km	Total distance	Location	
810	Amsa	암사	岩寺		Line 8	1.1	12.4		
811	Cheonho (Pungnaptoseong)	천호 (풍납토성)	千戶	Seoul Subway Line 5	Line 8	1.3	13.7		
812	Gangdong-gu Office	강동구청	江東區廳		Line 8	0.9	14.6		
813	Mongchontoseong (World Peace Gate)	몽촌토성 (평화의문)	夢村土城		Line 8	1.6	16.2	Songpa-gu	
814	Jamsil (Songpa-gu Office)	잠실 (송파구청)	蠶室	Seoul Subway Line 2	Line 8	0.8	17.0	Songpa-gu	
815	Seokchon (Hansol Hospital)	석촌 (한솔병원)	石村	Seoul Subway Line 9	Line 8	1.2	18.2	Songpa-gu	
816	Songpa	송파	松坡		Line 8	0.9	19.1	Songpa-gu	
817	Garak Market	가락시장	可樂市場	Seoul Subway Line 3	Line 8	0.8	19.9	Songpa-gu	
818	Munjeong	문정	文井		Line 8	0.9	20.8	Songpa-gu	
819	Jangji	장지	長旨		Line 8	0.9	21.7	Songpa-gu	
820	Bokjeong	복정	福井	Suin–Bundang Line	Line 8	0.9	22.6	Songpa-gu	
821	Namwirye	남위례	南慰禮		Line 8	1.6	24.2	Gyeonggi-do	Seongnam-si
822	Sanseong	산성	山城		Line 8	1.1	25.3	Gyeonggi-do	Seongnam-si
823	Namhansanseong (Seongnam Court & Prosecutors' Office)	남한산성입구 (성남법원·검찰청)	南漢山城入口		Line 8	1.3	26.6	Gyeonggi-do	Seongnam-si
824	Dandaeogeori (Shingu College)	단대오거리 (신구대학교)	丹岱오거리		Line 8	0.8	27.4	Gyeonggi-do	Seongnam-si
825	Sinheung	신흥	新興		Line 8	0.8	28.2	Gyeonggi-do	Seongnam-si
826	Sujin	수진	壽進		Line 8	0.9	29.1	Gyeonggi-do	Seongnam-si
827	Moran	모란	牡丹	Suin–Bundang Line	Line 8	1.0	30.1	Gyeonggi-do	Seongnam-si

=== Line 9 ===
Station Number	Station name			EX	Transfer	Station distance	Total distance	Location
Station Number	Romanized	Hangul	Hanja	EX	Transfer	in km		Location
901	Gaehwa	개화	開花			---	0.0	Gangseo-gu
902	Gimpo Int'l Airport	김포공항	金浦空港	●	Gimpo Goldline Seohae Line	3.6	3.6	Gangseo-gu
903	Airport Market	공항시장	空港市場	|		0.8	4.4	Gangseo-gu
904	Sinbanghwa	신방화	新傍花	|		0.8	5.2	Gangseo-gu
905	Magongnaru (Seoul Botanic Park)	마곡나루 (서울식물원)	麻谷나루	●	AREX	0.9	6.1	Gangseo-gu
906	Yangcheon Hyanggyo	양천향교	陽川鄕校	|		1.4	7.5	Gangseo-gu
907	Gayang	가양	加陽	●		1.3	8.8	Gangseo-gu
908	Jeungmi	증미	曾米	|		0.7	9.5	Gangseo-gu
909	Deungchon	등촌	登村	|		1.0	10.5	Gangseo-gu
910	Yeomchang	염창	鹽倉	●		0.9	11.4	Gangseo-gu
911	Sinmokdong	신목동	新木洞	|		0.9	12.3	Yangcheon-gu
912	Seonyudo	선유도	仙遊島	|		1.2	13.5	Yeongdeungpo-gu
913	Dangsan	당산	堂山	●	Seoul Subway Line 2	1.0	14.5	Yeongdeungpo-gu
914	National Assembly (KDB Bank)	국회의사당 (KDB산업은행)	國會議事堂	|		1.5	16.0	Yeongdeungpo-gu
915	Yeouido	여의도	汝矣島	●	Seoul Subway Line 5	0.9	16.9	Yeongdeungpo-gu
916	Saetgang (KB Financial Town)	샛강 (KB금융타운)	샛강	|	Sillim Line	0.8	17.7	Yeongdeungpo-gu
917	Noryangjin	노량진	鷺梁津	●	Seoul Subway Line 1	1.2	18.9	Dongjak-gu
918	Nodeul	노들	노들	|		1.1	20.0	Dongjak-gu
919	Heukseok (Chung-Ang Univ.)	흑석 (중앙대입구)	黑石 (中央大入口)	|		1.1	21.1	Dongjak-gu
920	Dongjak (Seoul National Cemetery)	동작 (현충원)	銅雀 (顯忠院)	●	Seoul Subway Line 4	1.4	22.5	Dongjak-gu
921	Gubanpo	구반포	舊盤浦	|		1.0	23.5	Seocho-gu
922	Sinbanpo	신반포	新盤浦	|		0.7	24.2	Seocho-gu
923	Express Bus Terminal	고속터미널	高速터미널	●	Seoul Subway Line 3 Seoul Subway Line 7	0.8	25.0	Seocho-gu
924	Sapyeong	사평	砂平	|		1.1	26.1	Seocho-gu
925	Sinnonhyeon	신논현	新論峴	●	Shinbundang Line	0.9	27.0	Gangnam-gu
926	Eonju (CHA Gangnam Medical Center)	언주 (강남차병원)	彦州	|		0.8	27.8	Gangnam-gu
927	Seonjeongneung	선정릉	宣靖陵	●	Suin–Bundang Line	0.9	28.7	Gangnam-gu
928	Samseong Jungang	삼성중앙	三成中央	|		0.8	29.5	Gangnam-gu
929	Bongeunsa	봉은사	奉恩寺	●		0.8	30.3	Gangnam-gu
930	Sports Complex	종합운동장	綜合運動場	●	Seoul Subway Line 2	1.4	31.7	Songpa-gu
931	Samjeon	삼전	三田	|		1.4	33.1	Songpa-gu
932	Seokchon Gobun	석촌고분	石村古墳	|		0.8	33.9	Songpa-gu
933	Seokchon (Hansol Hospital)	석촌 (한솔병원)	石村	●	Seoul Subway Line 8	1.0	34.9	Songpa-gu
934	Songpanaru	송파나루	松坡나루	|		0.8	35.7	Songpa-gu
935	Hanseong Baekje	한성백제	漢城百濟	|		0.8	36.5	Songpa-gu
936	Olympic Park (Korea National Sport Univ.)	올림픽공원 (한국체대)	올림픽公園	●	Seoul Subway Line 5	1.4	37.9	Songpa-gu
937	Dunchon Oryun	둔촌오륜	遁村五輪	|		1.0	38.9	Gangdong-gu
938	VHS Medical Center	중앙보훈병원	中央報勳病院	●		1.7	40.6	Gangdong-gu

=== Ui-Sinseol Line ===
Station	Station name			Transfer	Distance (km)		Location
Station	English	Hangul	Hanja	Transfer	Station	Total	Location
S110	Bukhansan Ui (Doseonsa)	북한산우이 (도선사입구)	北韓山牛耳		---		Gangbuk-gu
S111	Solbat Park	솔밭공원	솔밭公園		0.8		Gangbuk-gu
S112	April 19th National Cemetery (Duksung Women's University)	4·19민주묘지 (덕성여대)	4·19民主墓地		0.7	1.5	Gangbuk-gu
S113	Gaori	가오리	加五里		0.9	2.4	Gangbuk-gu
S114	Hwagye	화계	華溪		0.8	3.2	Gangbuk-gu
S115	Samyang	삼양	三陽		0.8	4.0	Gangbuk-gu
S116	Samyang Sageori	삼양사거리	三陽四거리		0.7	4.7	Gangbuk-gu
S117	Solsaem	솔샘	솔샘		0.8	5.5	Gangbuk-gu
S118	Bukhansan Bogungmun (Seokyong University)	북한산보국문 (서경대)	北漢山輔國門		1.2	6.7	Seongbuk-gu
S119	Jeongneung	정릉 (국민대)	貞陵		1.2	7.9	Seongbuk-gu
S120	Sungshin Women's University	성신여대입구 (돈암)	誠信女大入口	Seoul Subway Line 4	1.2	9.1	Seongbuk-gu
S121	Bomun	보문	普門	Seoul Subway Line 6	0.9	10.0	Seongbuk-gu
S122	Sinseol-dong	신설동	新設洞	Seoul Subway Line 1 Seoul Subway Line 2	1.0	11.0	Dongdaemun-gu

=== Main line ===
All stations are in Seoul.

Station Number	Station name English	Station name Hangul	Station name Hanja	Transfer	Distance in km	Total Distance	Location
S401	Saetgang	샛강	샛강	Seoul Subway Line 9	---	0.0	Yeongdeungpo-gu
S402	Daebang (Sungae Hospital)	대방 (성애병원)	大方	Seoul Subway Line 1	0.6	0.6	Yeongdeungpo-gu
S403	Seoul Regional Office of Military Manpower	서울지방병무청	서울地方兵務廳		0.9	1.5	Yeongdeungpo-gu
S404	Boramae	보라매	보라매	Seoul Subway Line 7	0.6	2.1	Dongjak-gu
S405	Boramae Park	보라매공원	보라매公園	Nangok branch	0.6	2.7	Dongjak-gu
S406	Boramae Medical Center (Korea Specialty Contractor Center)	보라매병원 (전문건설회관)	보라매病院		0.8	3.5	Dongjak-gu
S407	Danggok	당곡	堂谷		0.5	4.0	Gwanak-gu
S408	Sillim	신림	新林	Seoul Subway Line 2	0.7	4.7	Gwanak-gu
S409	Seowon	서원	書院		0.7	5.4	Gwanak-gu
S410	Seoul National Univ. Venture Town	서울대벤처타운	서울大벤처타운		1.1	6.5	Gwanak-gu
S411	Gwanaksan (Seoul National Univ.)	관악산 (서울대)	冠岳山		1.1	7.6	Gwanak-gu
