= Duksung Women's University =

Private university in Seoul, South Korea

- 덕성여자대학교
- Motto: 자생(自生) · 자립(自立) · 자각(自覺)
- Type: Private
- Established: 1920; 106 years ago
- Founder: Ms. Cha Mirisa
- President: Min Jae Hong (민재홍)
- Academic staff: 469
- Administrative staff: 121
- Students: 6,944
- Location: Seoul, South Korea; 37.6509°N 127.0169°E
- Colors: Duksung burgundy
- Website: www.duksung.ac.kr

Korean name
- Hangul: 덕성여자대학교
- Hanja: 德成女子大學校
- RR: Deokseong yeoja daehakgyo
- MR: Tŏksŏng yŏja taehakkyo

Duksung Women's University (DSWU; Korean: 덕성여자대학교) is a private university in Seoul, South Korea, founded in 1920. Its campus is located in Dobong District, Seoul Metropolitan Government, and a lifelong graduate school and a corporation are located in Jongno District. Duksung Women's University is the first female school founded by a female independence activist. In particular, Duksung Women's University stands out in early childhood education. The English abbreviations of the university are Duksung, DSU, and DSWU. Located around Deokseong Women's University on a transportation route, the subway station has the April 19th National Cemetery (Duksung Women's University) station on Seoul LRT Ui-Sinseol Line.

== History ==
The school was established in 1920 as part of the drive for improved education, which arose out of the March First Movement. Its founder, Cha Mirisa (차미리사, 1880–1955), was an educator and leader of the Joseon Women's Education Society. At the time, it was known as the Geunhwa Academy. Because the name Geunhwa (근화; 槿花) refers to the Korean national flower, it was changed to "Duksung" under pressure from Japanese authorities in 1938.

Duksung was officially founded as a college, on the site of the Unhyeongung palace, in 1950. During this same year, Duksung Woman's Junior College was established along with the opening of a department of Korean literature and a department of domestic science. Dr Song Geum-seon took office as the first president of the school. It became a four-year college in 1952. In 1984, the main campus was moved to its present location in Dobong District. The college became a university in 1987.

In 2020, KoreaPost issued a stamp commemorating the 100th anniversary of the founding of Duksung Women's University.

== Academics ==
At the undergraduate level, courses of study are provided through five colleges: Humanities, Natural Science, Pharmacy, Social Science, and Art and Design. The university also offers specialized graduate courses.

=== Undergraduate ===
- College of Humanities
- College of Social Sciences
- College of Natural Sciences
- College of Information and Media
- College of Pharmacy
- College of Art and Design

=== Graduate ===
Duksung University Graduate School was instituted in 1979. Male students enter the master's and doctorate programs. The master's and doctorate programs for university-research institute collaborative researches are in conjunction with the Korea Food & Drug Administration and Korea Food Research Institute.

The Graduate School was selected as an excellent university in the area of a graduate school, in the general university evaluation conducted by Korean Council for University Education.

== Campus ==
The main campus is situated in Dobong District, a district of northern Seoul. It is close to both Bukhan Mountain and Dobong Mountain. The continuing education center is located at the former campus location, on the site of the Unhyeongung palace.

Ssangmundong Campus

- Colleges, Graduate School
- 33, Samyangro 144-gil, (419 Ssangmun Dong), Dobong Gu, Seoul 132–714, Korea
- Location: 300m toward the direction of Uyi-dong from Suyuri 4.19 tower

Uni-dong Campus

- Graduate School of Education, Graduate School of FTB, School of Continuing Education, the corporate office
- 114, Uni-dong, Jongno-gu, Seoul, Korea
- Location : 300m toward the north from Tabgol Park in Jongno 2-ga(avenue)

== Student life ==
=== Clubs and communities ===
- Archaeology Team - a field-investigation of historic places and studies on cultural heritage and traditions.
- Duk-Yeong-Hoe(DECAS) - English conversation practice.
- Current English Study Club - studies on international affairs and improvement of English skills.
- Byeori-Byeori - observation and studies on the celestial body.

==== Social Branch ====
- Korean History Study Group - studies on the contemporary history of Korea.
- Teo-Sa-Rang - voluntary service for rural community and studies on the life in rural communities.
- KUSA - voluntary social service for the lower income class of the society including after-school-curricular activities.
- Cham-U-Ri - voluntary social service for persons with a visual disability.
- Ho-U-Heo - voluntary social service for persons with a disability in rehabilitation facilities.

==== Religious Branch ====
- Duk-Bul-Hoe - studies on Buddhist thought, and its propagation.
- CAM (Christs Ambassador Mission) - Christianity propagation.
- Deresa (Catholic Student Association) - Catholic propagation.
- CBA - Christianity propagation.
- CCC (Campus Crusade for Christ) - Christianity propagation.
- IVF (Inter-Varsity Christian Fellowship) - Christianity propagation.
- SFC (Student for Christ) - Christianity propagation.
- YWAM (Youth With A Mission) - Christianity propagation.
- JOY - Christianity propagation.

==== Life and Culture Branch ====
- Moon Light - to foster the appreciation of classical music.
- Baek-Wun - training of Korean traditional martial arts.
- Un-San (mountaineering club) - the cultivation of mind and body through climbing.
- HAM (amateur radio operator) - exchange with domestic and foreign members through radio communication.
- Youth Hostel.

==== Performing Art Branch ====
- Sol-Ba-Ram - studies and spread of the people's song.
- Dod-Um - spread of a rhythmic movement of the people's song.
- Hana Puppet Show Club - for promotion of the university culture through puppet shows.
- Han-Dae-Nori - spread of the performances with Korean traditional farmer's musical instruments.
- CADEMU - studies the spread of popular songs.
- Unhyang Classical Guitar Club - learning classical guitar techniques.
- Unhyun Dramatic Art Study Group - promotion of the university culture through dramatic arts.
- Folk - Rock and Roll band.

==== Exhibition and Creation Branch ====
- Yeo-Reum - contribute to the cultural development of the university through cartoons.
- Unji Literary Club - learning the literature theories and creative activities.
- Han-Bit - photograph works and exhibition.
- Unhyeon Calligraphy - to foster calligraphy.
- Mi-Ye-tteul - studies on making a cross-stitch and teddy-bear.
- Ye-Wun - studies on pure arts and creative activities.
- Location of club rooms: The 3rd floor of Student Hall.

== Facilities ==
=== University Library ===
Located in the middle of the campus, the library has 1,589 seats, and holds over 460,000 oriental books, 90,000 western books and 6,848 types of periodicals and collected papers. The library has 100,000 pieces of media data, such as audio/video materials, slides and CD-ROM. Through the Digital Library System, data searching and viewing full texts of web databases are possible on the library web-site. Data which are not in the collection of the library are provided from libraries in Korea and abroad. The library is pursuing a joint list and cross-loan service with private universities in the northeastern part of Seoul.

=== Fitness Center ===
Located in the Hana Nuri Gymnasium, which was newly built in February 2010, the Fitness Center is equipped with treadmills, cycles, steppers, weight training equipment, and aerobic workout equipment. There is also a running track. To manage students' health, the Fitness Center offers individual exercise training program and body composition measuring service.

=== Dormitory ===
Single and double rooms are available in DWU's on-campus student residence. There is a lounge and kitchen per single unit occupied by 10-13 people. In the lounge and kitchen, a refrigerator, electric rice cooker, gas oven, dining table and cooking utensils are available to use. Other convenience facilities include a communal laundromat, TV room to watch TV and VTR, physical training room, reading room and Internet room for information search.

=== International Language Center ===
The International Language Center has a new building, dormitory facility, and research staff of master and doctorate degree professors majoring in English and Korean education, and foreign teaching faculty.

== Facts ==
- History: founded in 1920 as Geun-Hwa School
- Founder: Ms. Cha Mirisa (Melissa), who was a devout Roman Catholic
- Location: Seoul, Korea
  - Ssangmun Campus: Main Office, Undergraduate Programs, Graduate School
  - Jongro Campus: Corporate Office, Graduate School of Professional Studies, School of Adult and Continuing Education
- Enrolled students: 6,944 in 2022 (approx 6% are post-grads)
- Faculty members: 469 in 2022
- Staff members (including contract employees): 121 in 2022
- Academic courses: 2,421, including 17 Master's and 5 Doctorate programmes.

== Notable alumni ==
- Park Jung-soo, actress
- Yeon Min-ji, singer
- Choi Jin-ri, singer, actress, model and dancer

== See also ==
- List of colleges and universities in South Korea
- Education in South Korea
