= Samyang Sageori station =

Train station in South Korea

Coordinates: 37°34′28″N 127°01′22″E

L07 삼양사거리 Samyang Sageori
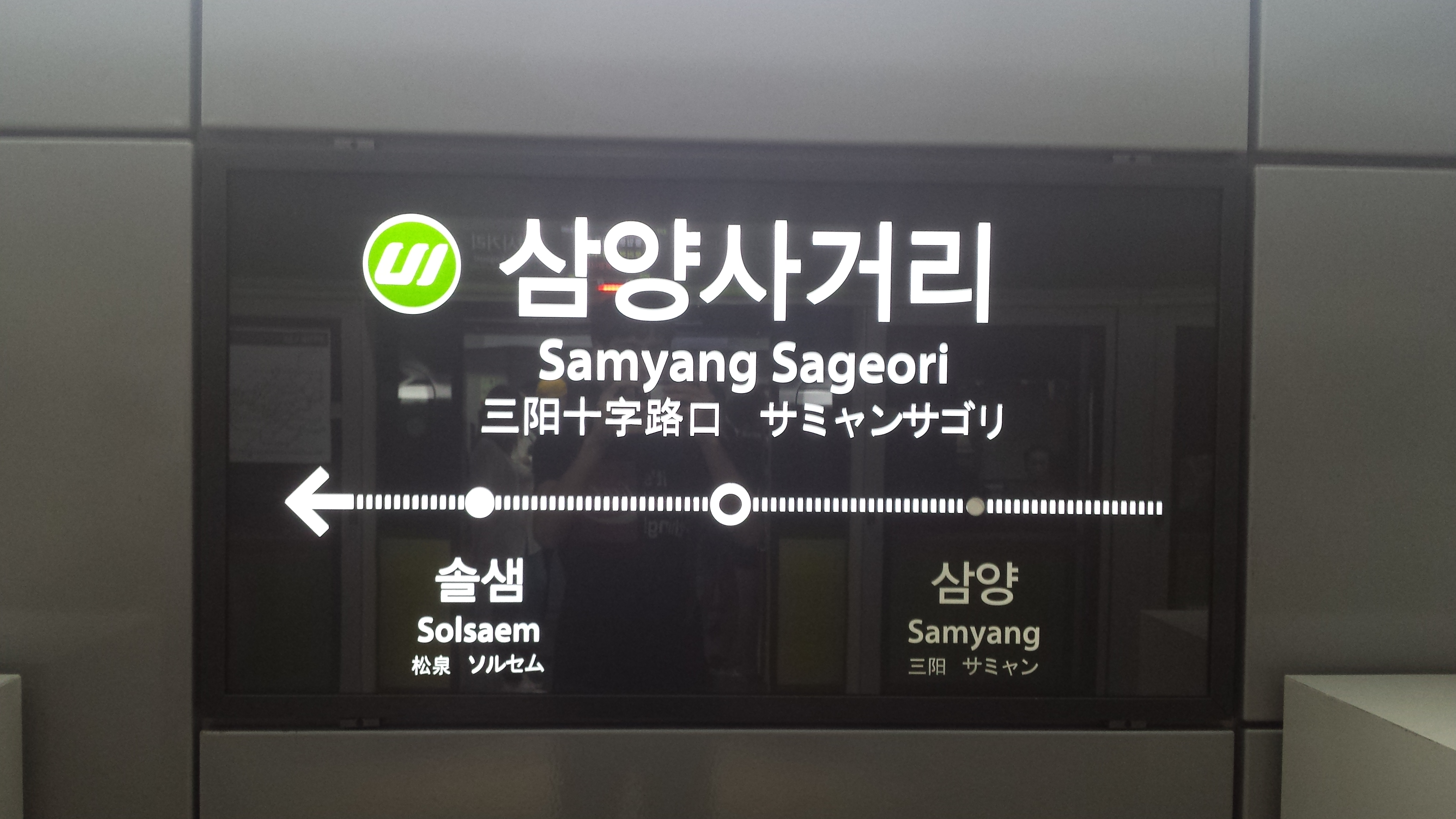

Korean name
- Hangul: 삼양사거리역
- Hanja: 三陽四거리驛
- Revised Romanization: Samyangsageori-yeok
- McCune–Reischauer: Samyangsagŏri-yŏk

General information
- Location: 745-142 Mia-dong, Gangbuk-gu, Seoul
- Operator: UiTrans LRT Co., Ltd.
- Line: Ui LRT
- Platforms: 2
- Tracks: 2

Construction
- Structure type: Underground

History
- Opened: September 2, 2017

Services
Preceding station	Seoul Metropolitan Subway	Following station
Samyang towards Bukhansan Ui	Ui LRT	Solsaem towards Sinseol-dong
Location

Samyang Sageori Station is a station on the Ui LRT located in Mia-dong, Gangbuk-gu, Seoul. It opened on the 2 September 2017.
