= Solbat =

Solbat may refer to:

- Lucas Solbat (born 1971), Papua New Guinean footballer
- Solbat Park station, train station in Seoul
