= Sungshin Women's University station =

Station of the Seoul Metropolitan Subway

Coordinates: 37.59260°N 127.01637°E

성신여대입구 (돈암); Sungshin Women's Univ. (Donam)
L11
성신여대입구 (돈암)
Sungshin Women's Univ.
(Donam)
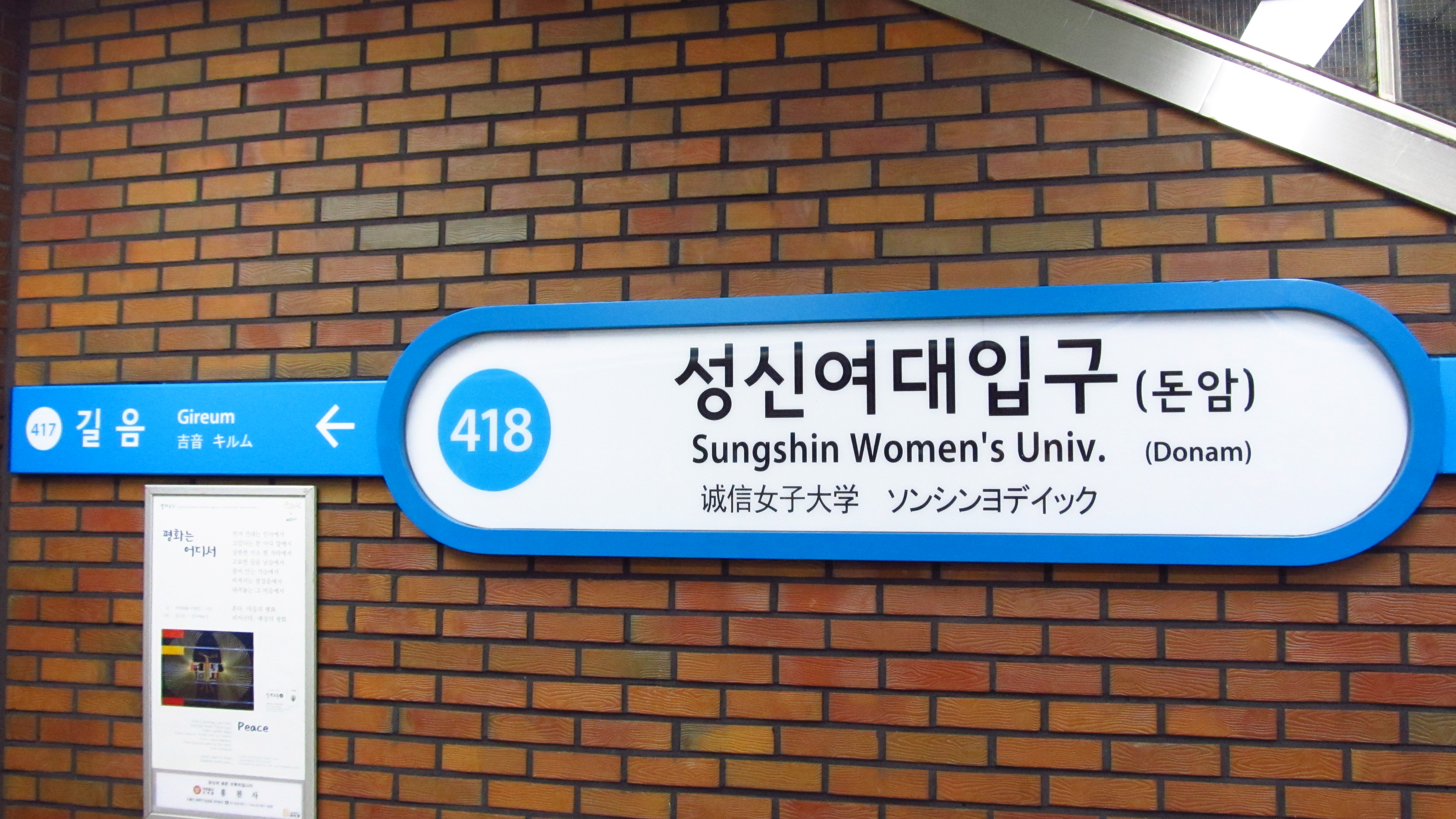
- Station Sign (Line 4)

Korean name
- Hangul: 성신여대입구역
- Hanja: 誠信女大入口驛
- Revised Romanization: Seongsinnyeodaeipgu-yeok
- McCune–Reischauer: Sŏngsinnyŏdaeipku-yŏk

General information
- Location: 65-1 Dongsomun-dong 5-ga, 102 Dongsomunno, Seongbuk-gu, Seoul
- Operator: Seoul Metro; UiTrans LRT Co., Ltd.
- Lines: Line 4 Ui LRT
- Platforms: 2
- Tracks: 2

Construction
- Structure type: Underground

Key dates
- April 20, 1985: Line 4 opened
- September 2, 2017: Ui LRT opened

Passengers
- (Daily) Based on Jan-Dec of 2012. Line 4: 53,200
Services
Preceding station	Seoul Metropolitan Subway	Following station
Gireum towards Jinjeop	Line 4	Hansung University towards Oido
Jeongneung towards Bukhansan Ui	Ui LRT	Bomun towards Sinseol-dong
Location

Sungshin Women's University Station is a station on the Line 4 of the Seoul Subway and Ui LRT in Seoul, South Korea. As its name indicates, it serves the nearby Sungshin Women's University.

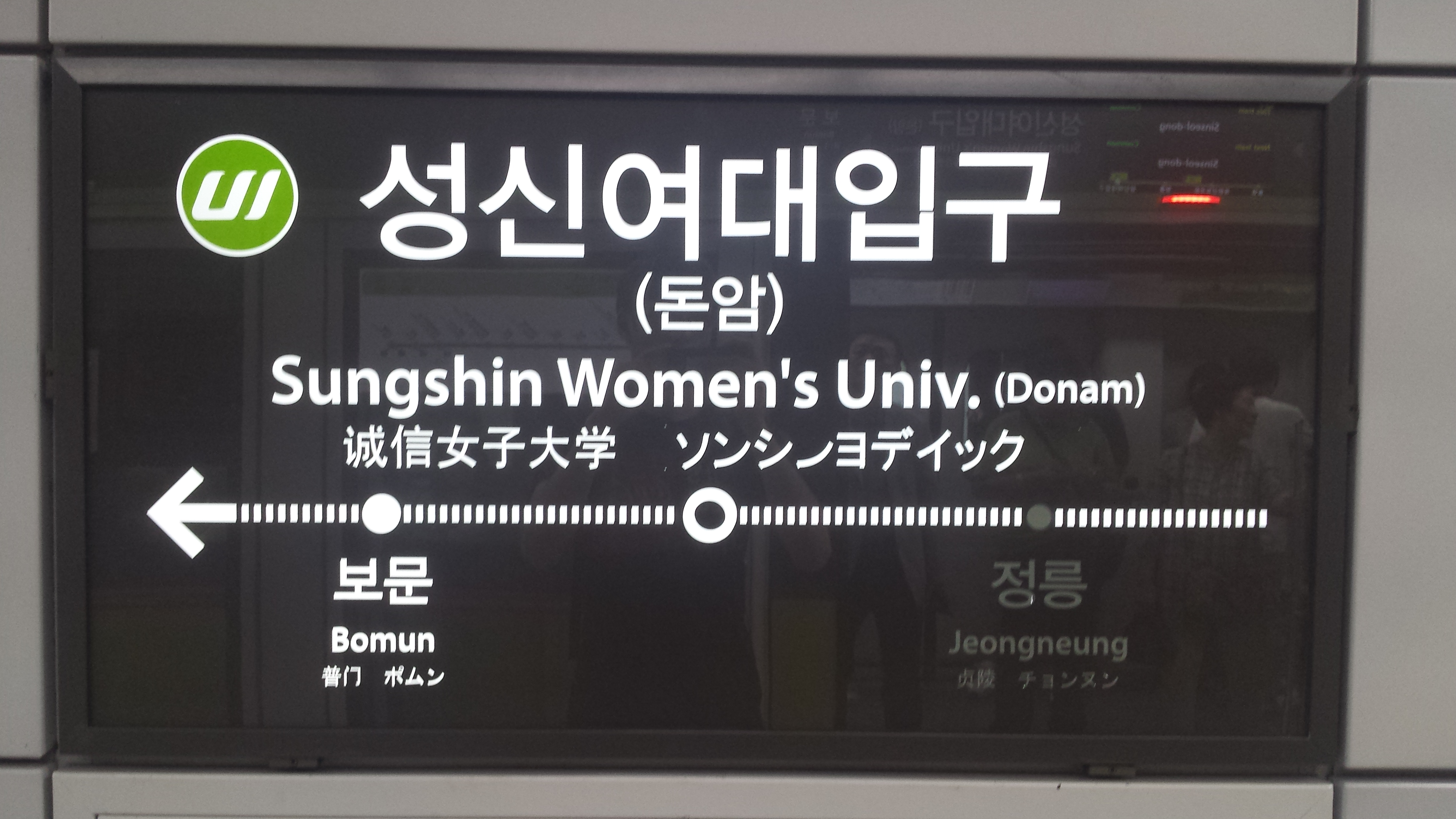
Ui LRT station sign

== Station layout ==
G	Street level	Exit

L1; Concourse	Lobby	Customer Service, Shops, Vending machines, ATMs

L2; Platforms	Side platform, doors will open on the right
L2; Platforms	Northbound	← Line 4 toward Jinjeop (Gireum)
L2; Platforms	Southbound	Line 4 toward Oido (Hansung Univ.) →
L2; Platforms	Side platform, doors will open on the right

== Vicinity ==
- Exit 1 : Sungshin Girls' Middle & High Schools, Mia-ri Pass
- Exit 2 : Sungshin Women's University
- Exit 3 : Seongbuk District Office, Donam Market
- Exit 4 : Donam Elementary School
- Exit 5 : Jeongdeok Elementary School, Hanshin Hyu APT
- Exit 6 :
- Exit 7 : Gomyeong Middle School, Mia-ri Pass
