= Jeongneung station =

Train station in Seoul, South Korea

Coordinates: 37°34′28″N 127°01′22″E

L10 정릉 (국민대) Jeongneung (Kookmin University)
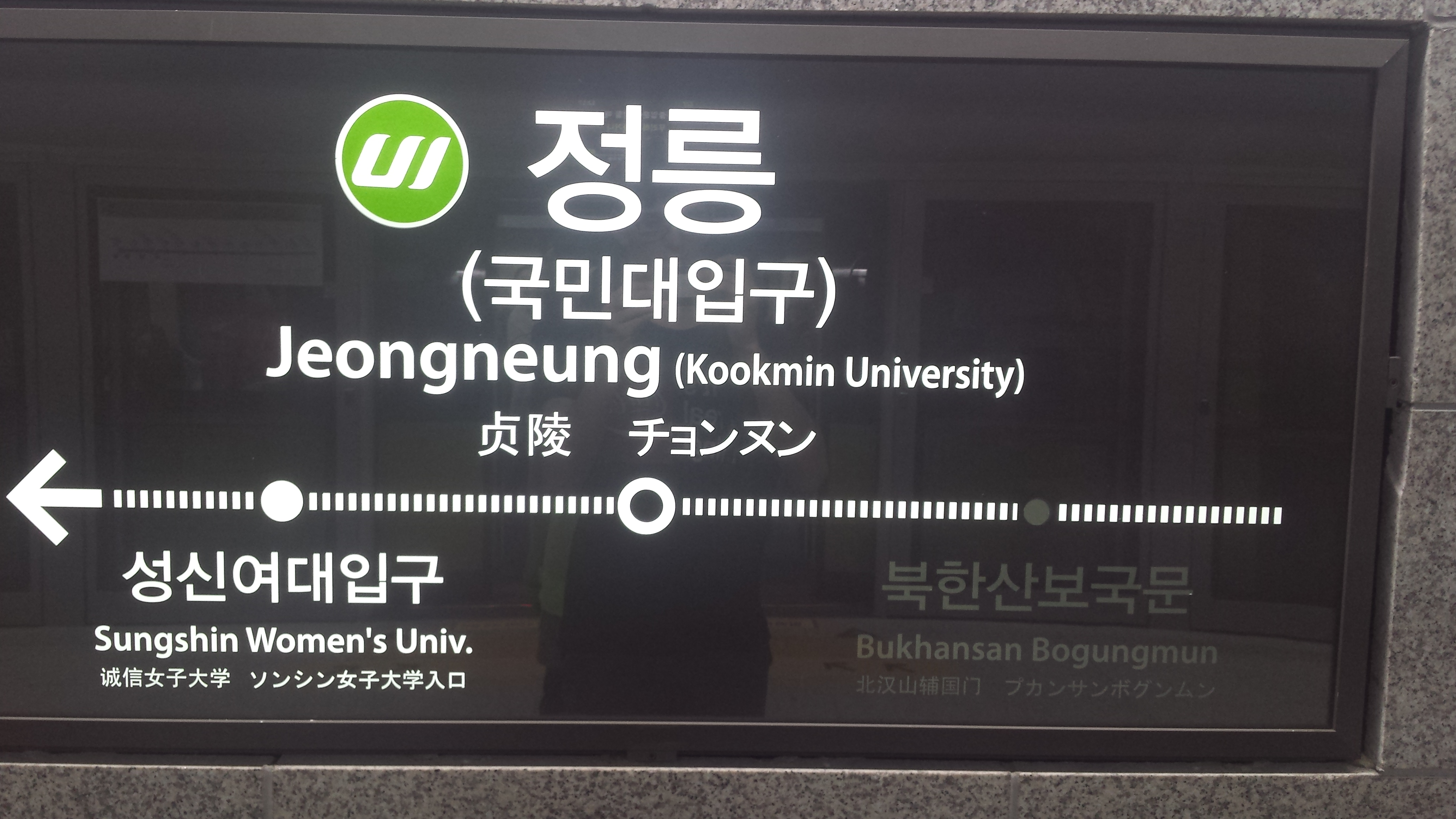

Korean name
- Hangul: 정릉역
- Hanja: 貞陵驛
- Revised Romanization: Jeongneung-yeok
- McCune–Reischauer: Chŏngnŭng-yŏk

General information
- Location: 139-80 Jeongneung-dong, Seongbuk-gu, Seoul
- Operator: UiTrans LRT Co., Ltd.
- Line: Ui LRT
- Platforms: 2
- Tracks: 2

Construction
- Structure type: Underground

History
- Opened: September 2, 2017

Services
Preceding station	Seoul Metropolitan Subway	Following station
Bukhansan Bogungmun towards Bukhansan Ui	Ui LRT	Sungshin Women's University towards Sinseol-dong
Location

Jeongneung Station is a station on the Ui LRT located in Jeongneung-dong, Seongbuk-gu, Seoul. It opened on the 2 September 2017.
