= Gaori station =

Train station in South Korea

Coordinates: 37°34′28″N 127°01′22″E

L04 가오리 Gaori
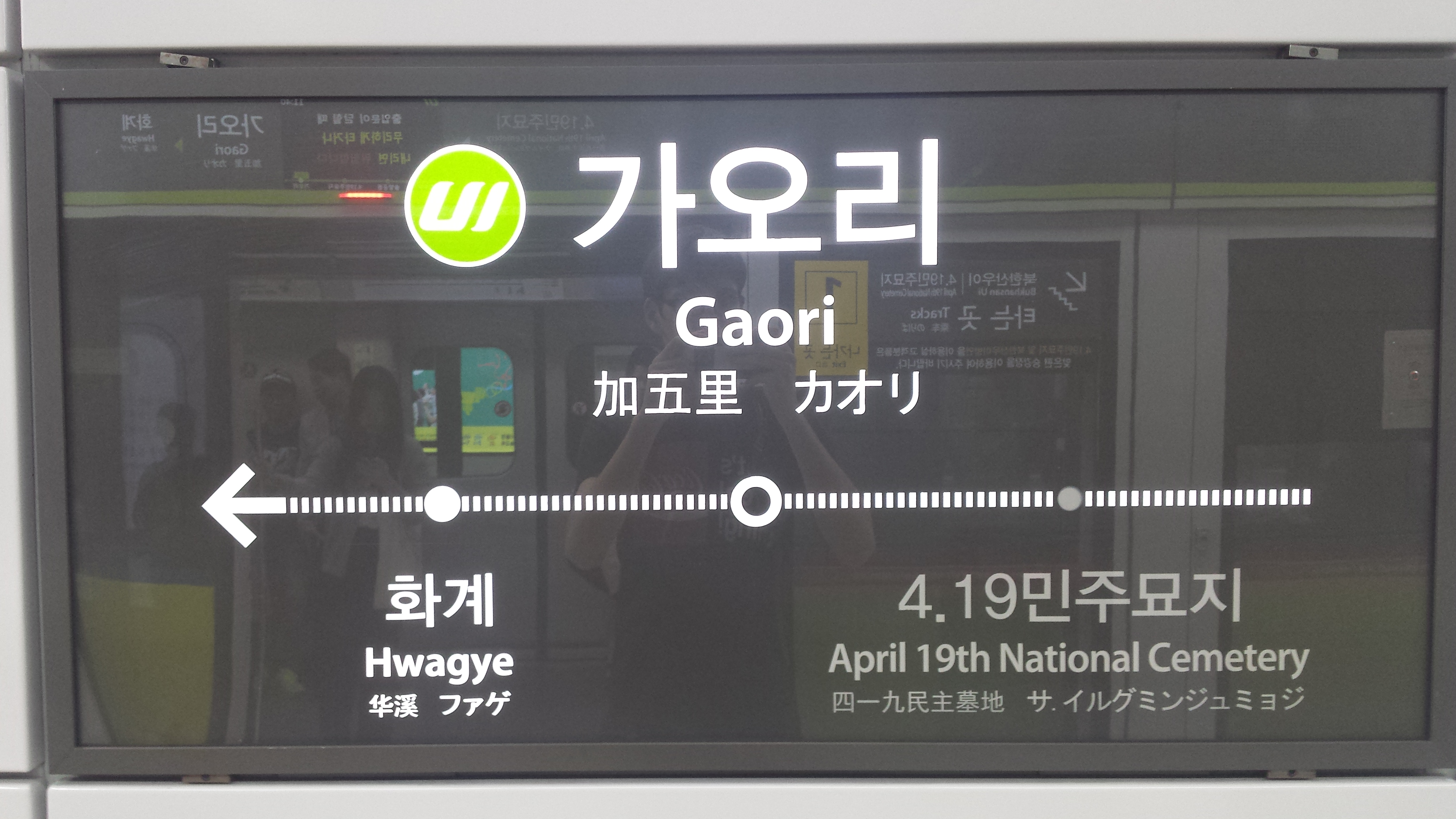

Korean name
- Hangul: 가오리역
- Hanja: 加五里驛
- Revised Romanization: Gaori-yeok
- McCune–Reischauer: Kaori-yŏk

General information
- Location: 338-46 Suyu-dong, Gangbuk-gu, Seoul
- Operator: UiTrans LRT Co., Ltd.
- Line: Ui LRT
- Platforms: 2
- Tracks: 2

Construction
- Structure type: Underground

History
- Opened: September 2, 2017

Services
Preceding station	Seoul Metropolitan Subway	Following station
April 19th National Cemetery towards Bukhansan Ui	Ui LRT	Hwagye towards Sinseol-dong
Location

Gaori station is a station on the Ui LRT located in Suyu-dong, Gangbuk-gu, Seoul, South Korea. It opened on 2 September 2017.
