= Hwagye station =

Train station in South Korea

Coordinates: 37°34′28″N 127°01′22″E

L05 화계 Hwagye
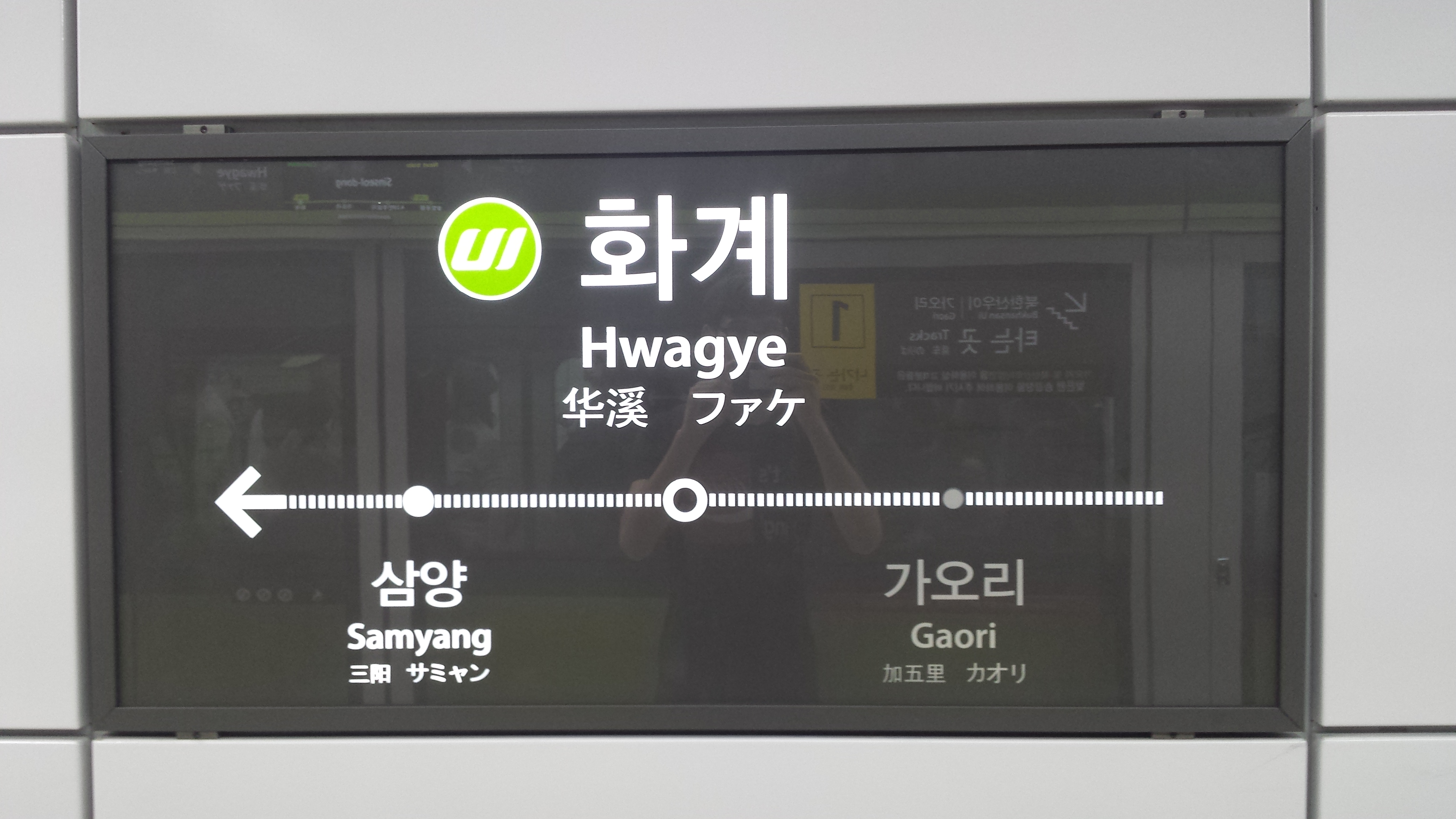

Korean name
- Hangul: 화계역
- Hanja: 華溪驛
- RR: Hwagye-yeok
- MR: Hwagye-yŏk

General information
- Location: 472-677 Suyu-dong, Gangbuk-gu, Seoul
- Operator: UiTrans LRT Co., Ltd.
- Line: Ui LRT
- Platforms: 2
- Tracks: 2

Construction
- Structure type: Underground

History
- Opened: September 2, 2017

Services
Preceding station	Seoul Metropolitan Subway	Following station
Gaori towards Bukhansan Ui	Ui LRT	Samyang towards Sinseol-dong
Location

Hwagye Station is a station on the Ui LRT located in Suyu-dong, Gangbuk District, Seoul. It opened on the 2 September 2017.
