= Solsaem station =

Station of the Seoul Metropolitan Subway

Coordinates: 37°34′28″N 127°01′22″E

L08 솔샘 Solsaem
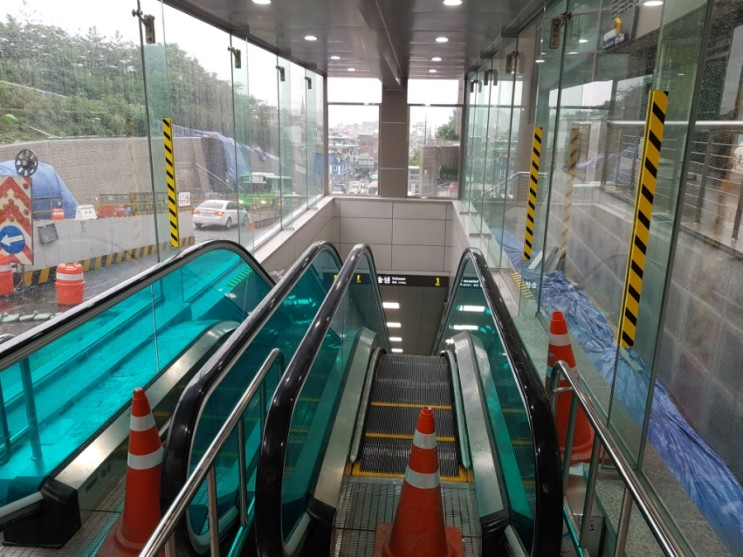

Korean name
- Hangul: 솔샘역
- Hanja: 솔샘驛
- Revised Romanization: Solsaem-yeok
- McCune–Reischauer: Solsaem-yŏk

General information
- Location: 1353-20 Mia-dong, Gangbuk-gu, Seoul
- Operator: UiTrans LRT Co., Ltd.
- Line: Ui LRT
- Platforms: 2
- Tracks: 2

Construction
- Structure type: Underground

History
- Opened: September 2, 2017

Services
Preceding station	Seoul Metropolitan Subway	Following station
Samyang Sageori towards Bukhansan Ui	Ui LRT	Bukhansan Bogungmun towards Sinseol-dong
Location

Solsaem Station is a station on the Ui LRT located in Mia-dong, Gangbuk-gu, Seoul. It opened on the 2 September 2017.

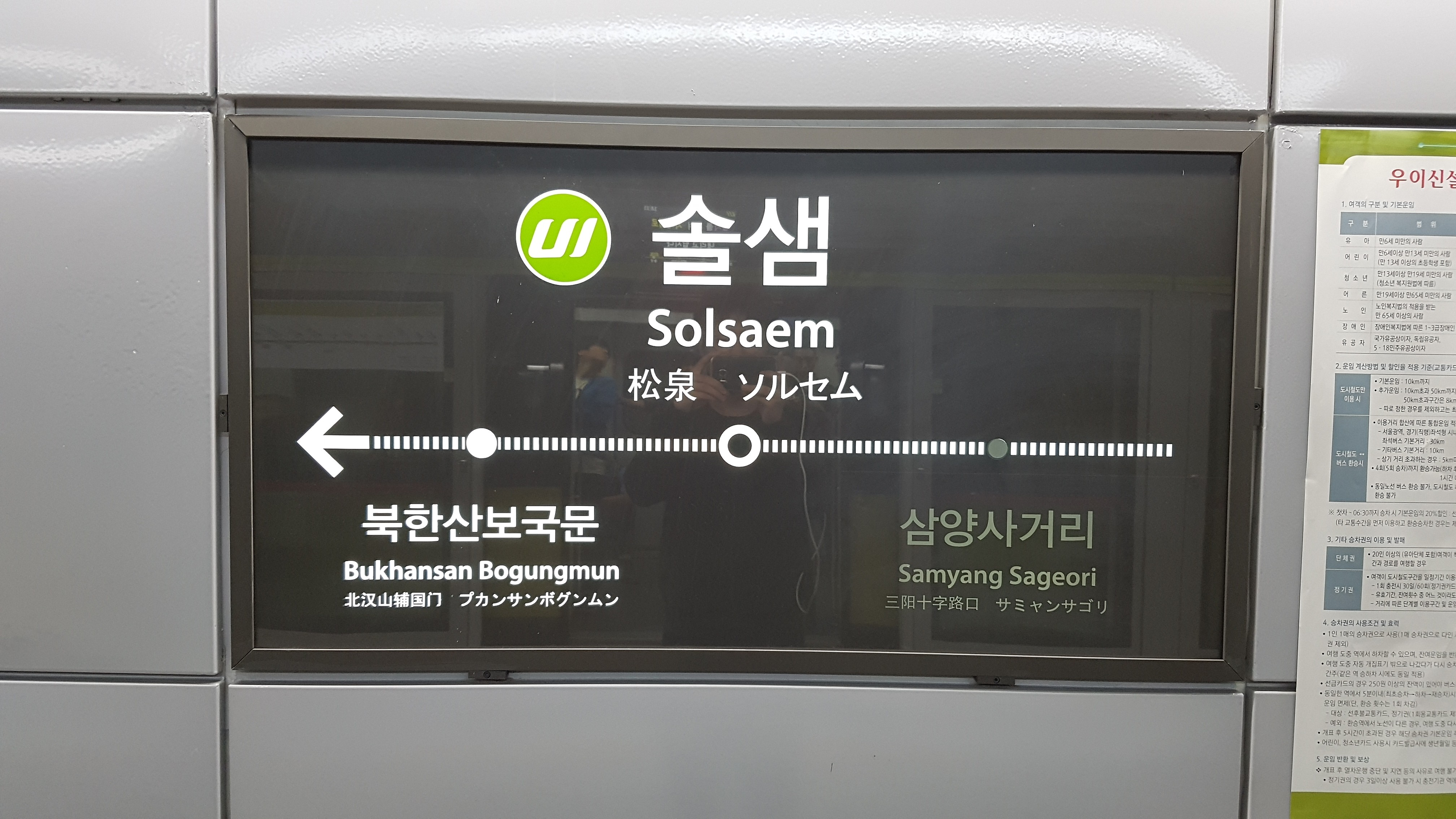
Station name platform sign
