= Samyang station =

Train station in South Korea

Coordinates: 37°34′28″N 127°01′22″E

L06 삼양 Samyang
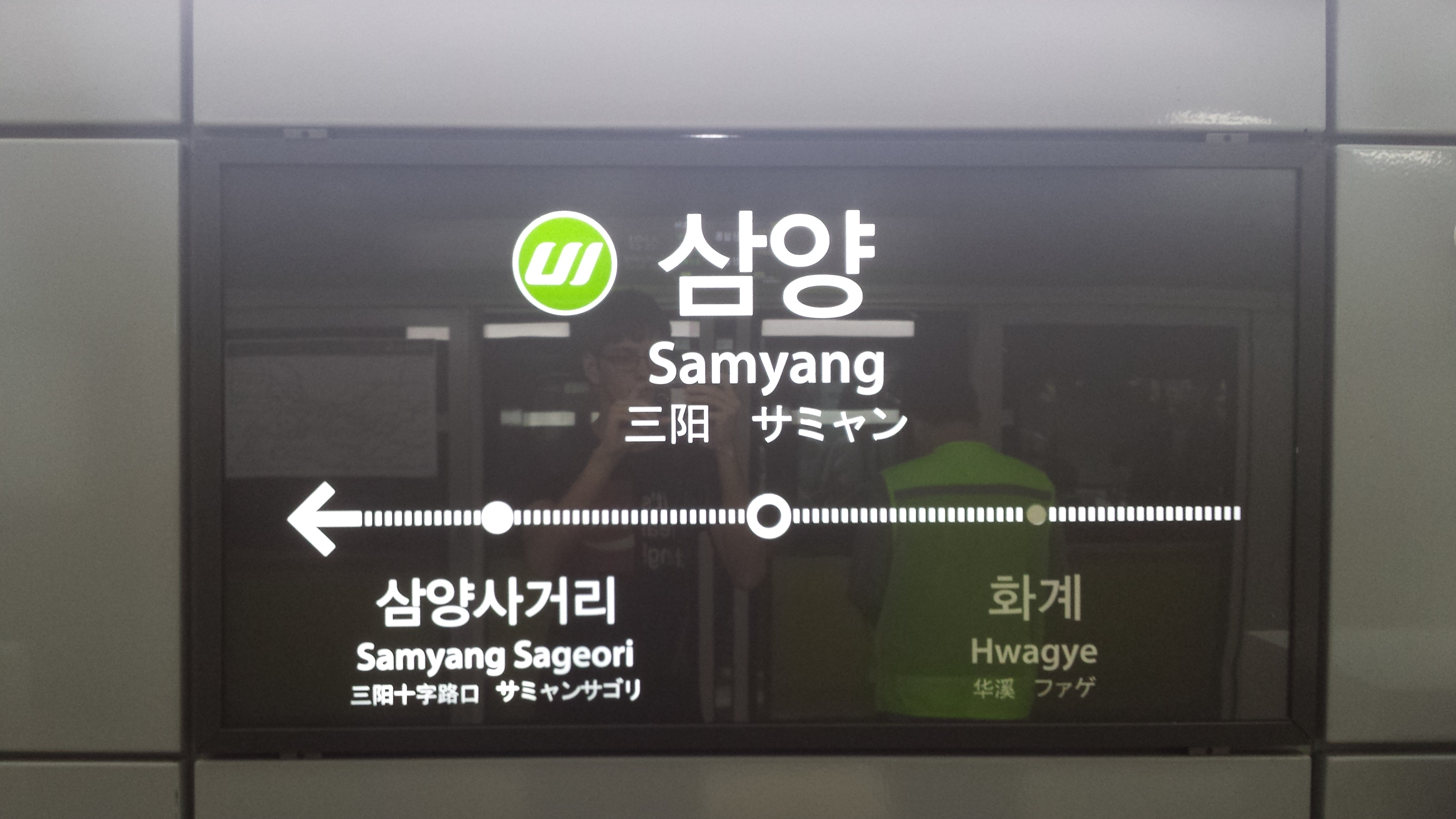

Korean name
- Hangul: 삼양역
- Hanja: 三陽驛
- RR: Samyang-yeok
- MR: Samyang-yŏk

General information
- Location: 791-4703 Mia-dong, Gangbuk-gu, Seoul
- Operator: UiTrans LRT Co., Ltd.
- Line: Ui LRT
- Platforms: 2
- Tracks: 2

Construction
- Structure type: Underground

History
- Opened: September 2, 2017

Services
Preceding station	Seoul Metropolitan Subway	Following station
Hwagye towards Bukhansan Ui	Ui LRT	Samyang Sageori towards Sinseol-dong
Location

Samyang station is a station on the Ui LRT located in Mia-dong, Gangbuk-gu, Seoul. It opened on 2 September 2017.
