= April 19th National Cemetery station =

Station of the Seoul Metropolitan Subway

Coordinates: 37°34′28″N 127°01′22″E

L03 4.19민주묘지(덕성여대) April 19th National Cemetery (Duksung Women's University)
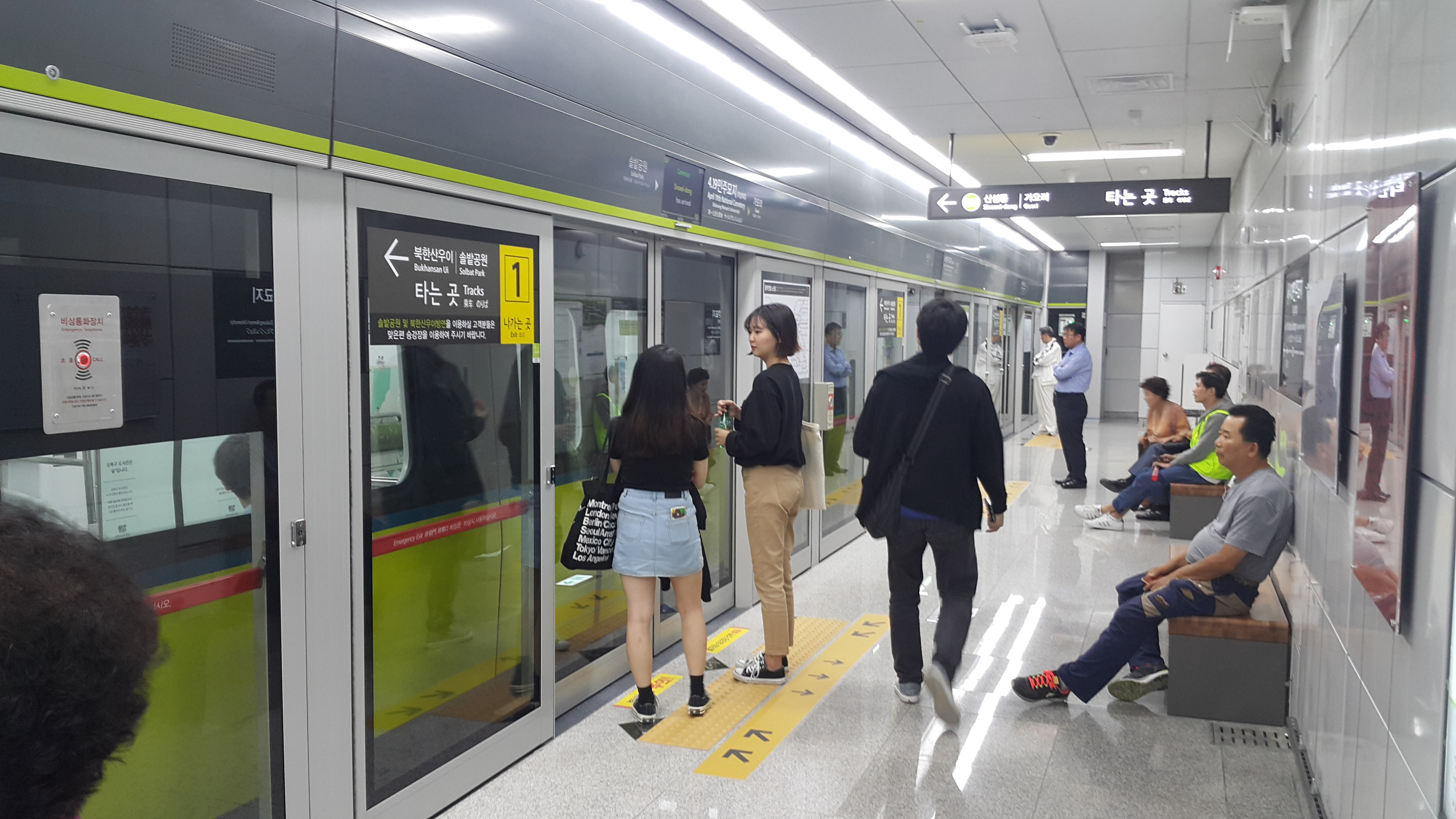
- The station platform in September 2017

Korean name
- Hangul: 4·19민주묘지역
- Hanja: 4·19民主墓地驛
- Revised Romanization: 4·19 (sa-ilgu) minjumyoji-yeok
- McCune–Reischauer: 4·19 (sa-ilgu) minjumyoji-yŏk

General information
- Location: 72-186 Ui-dong, Gangbuk District, Seoul
- Operator: UiTrans LRT Co., Ltd.
- Line: Ui LRT
- Platforms: 2
- Tracks: 2

Construction
- Structure type: Underground

History
- Opened: September 2, 2017

Services
Preceding station	Seoul Metropolitan Subway	Following station
Solbat Park towards Bukhansan Ui	Ui LRT	Gaori towards Sinseol-dong
Location

April 19th National Cemetery station is a station on the Ui LRT located in Ui-dong, Gangbuk District, Seoul. It opened on the 2 September 2017.

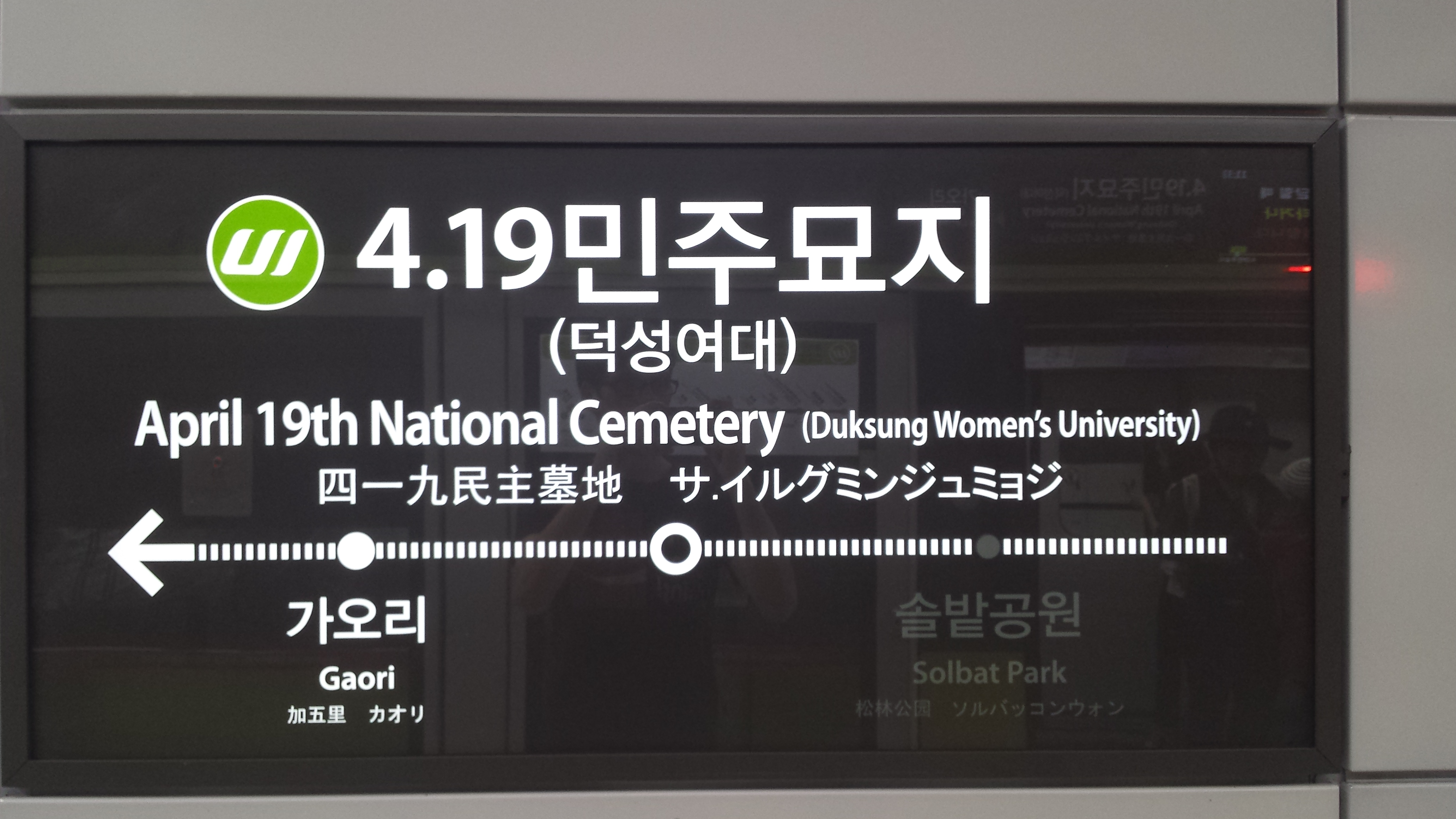
Station name platform sign

== Station layout ==
G	Street level	Exit

B1; Platforms	Side platform, doors will open on the right
B1; Platforms	Northbound	← Ui LRT toward Bukhansan Ui (Solbat Park)
B1; Platforms	Southbound	Ui LRT toward Sinseol-dong (Gaori) →
B1; Platforms	Side platform, doors will open on the right

B2	Underpass

== Vicinity ==
- Exit 1 : Duksung Women's University, Hyomun Middle/High School, Dobong Public Library, Seoul Baegun Elementary School
- Exit 2 : to April 19th National Cemetery, Ui-Dong Community Service Center, Solbat Neighborhood Park
