= Solbat Park station =

Station of the Seoul Metropolitan Subway

Coordinates: 37°34′28″N 127°01′22″E

L02 솔밭공원 Solbat Park
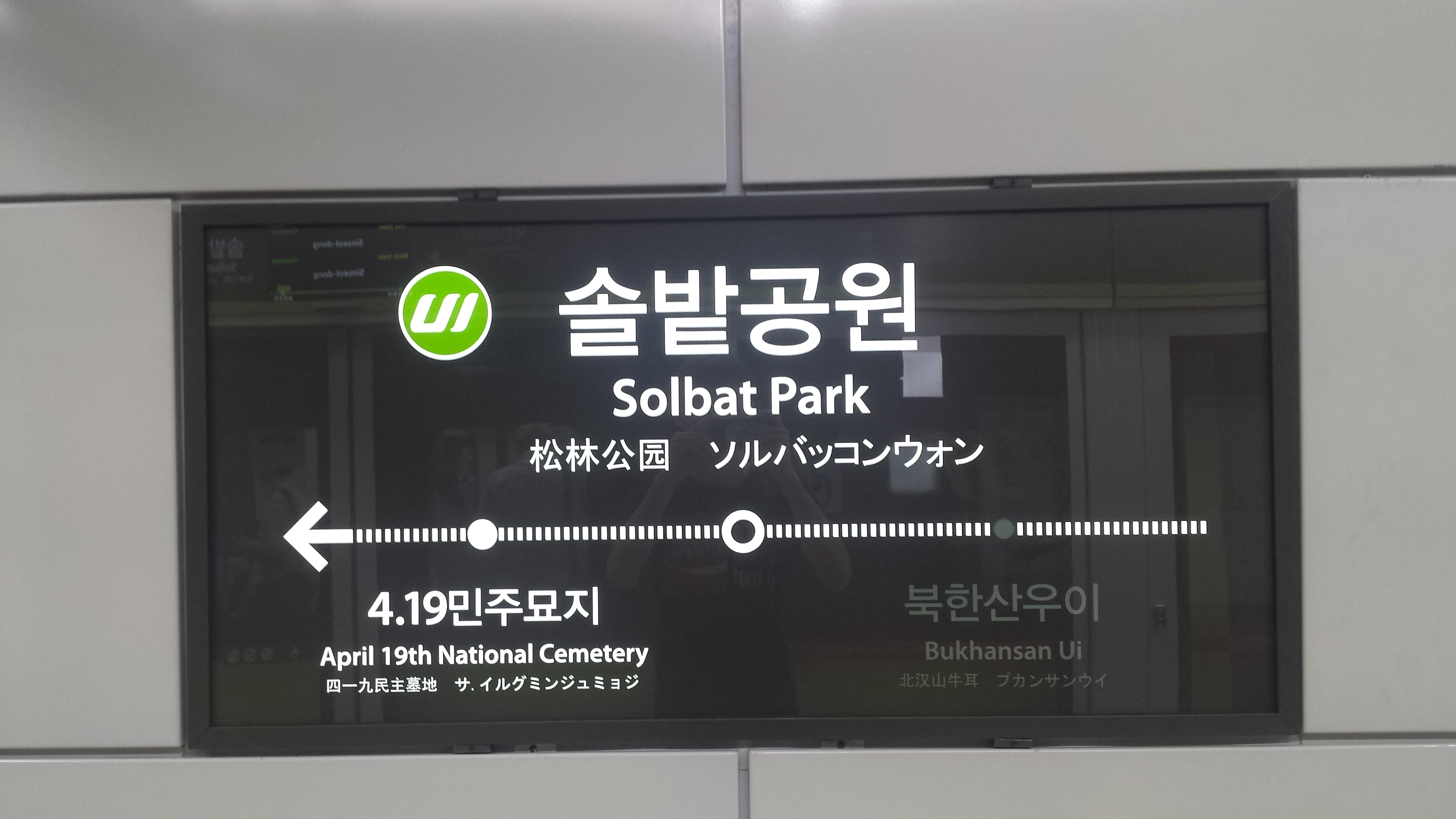

Korean name
- Hangul: 솔밭공원역
- Hanja: 솔밭公園驛
- Revised Romanization: Solbatgongwon-yeok
- McCune–Reischauer: Solbatkongwŏn-yŏk

General information
- Location: 57-28 Ui-dong, Gangbuk-gu, Seoul
- Operator: UiTrans LRT Co., Ltd.
- Line: Ui LRT
- Platforms: 2
- Tracks: 2

Construction
- Structure type: Underground

History
- Opened: 2 September 2017

Services
Preceding station	Seoul Metropolitan Subway	Following station
Bukhansan Ui Terminus	Ui LRT	April 19th National Cemetery towards Sinseol-dong
Location

Solbat Park Station is a station on the Ui LRT located in Ui-dong, Gangbuk-gu, Seoul. It opened on 2 September 2017.

== Station layout ==
G	Street level	Exit

B1; Platforms	Side platform, doors will open on the right
B1; Platforms	Northbound	← Ui LRT toward Bukhansan Ui (Terminus)
B1; Platforms	Southbound	Ui LRT toward Sinseol-dong (April 19th National Cemetery) →
B1; Platforms	Side platform, doors will open on the right

B2	Underpass

== Vicinity ==
- Exit 1 : Dobong Public Library, Seoul Baegun Elementary School
- Exit 2 : Solbat Neighborhood Park, Yeo Un-hyeong's Tomb, Sorabol Middle School
