= Ui LRT =

Light rail line in Seoul, South Korea

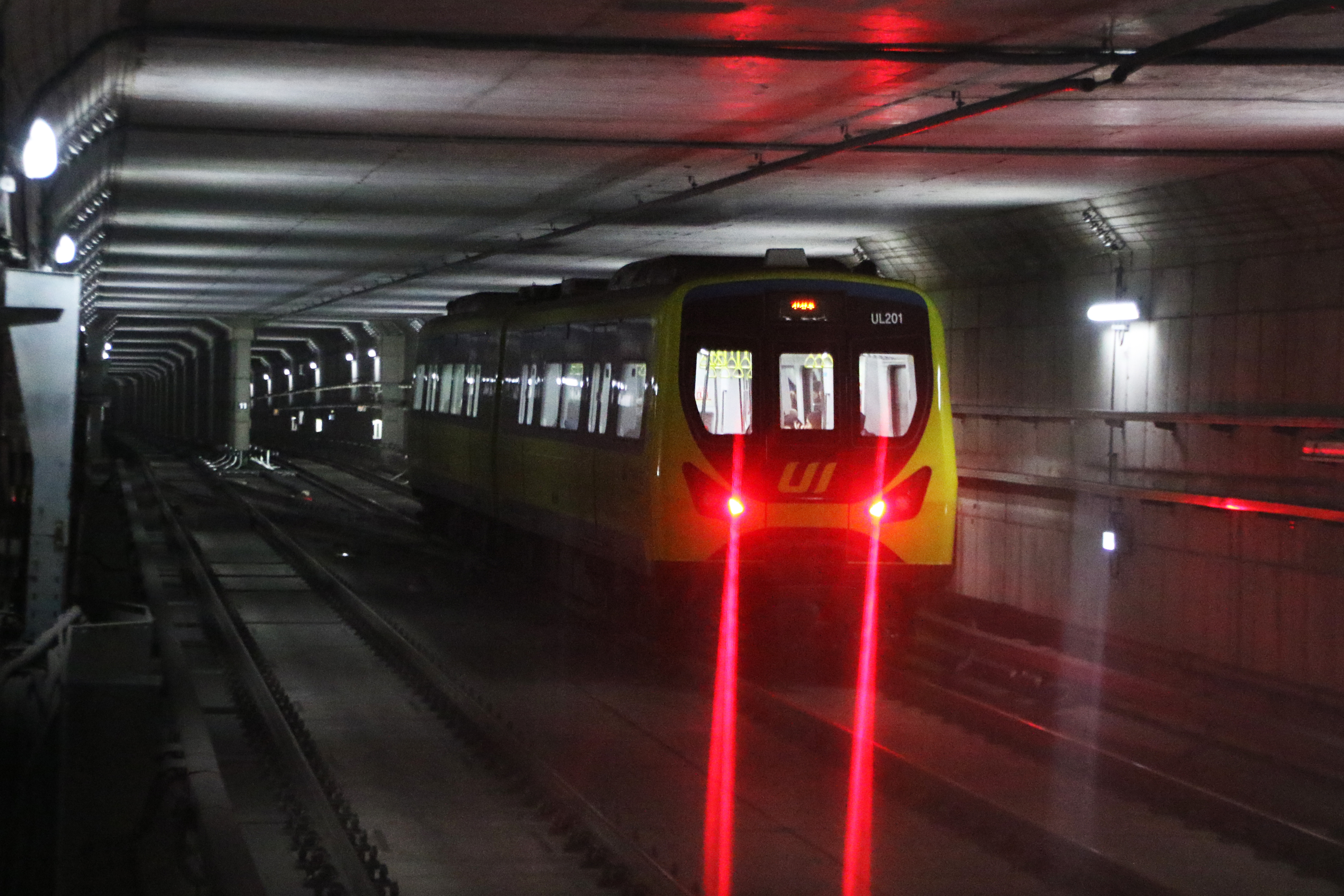

Overview
- Native name: 우이신설선(牛耳新設線); Uisinseolseon
- Status: Operational
- Termini: Bukhansan Ui; Sinseol-dong
- Stations: 13

Service
- Type: Light metro / Commuter rail
- System: Seoul Metropolitan Subway
- Rolling stock: 18 × 2-car Hyundai Rotem UL000
- Daily ridership: 75,055 (2024)
- Ridership: 27.47 million (2024) (▲1.9%)

History
- Opened: 2 September 2017

Technical
- Line length: 11.4 km (7.1 mi)
- Number of tracks: 2
- Track gauge: 1,435 mm (4 ft 8 1/2 in) standard gauge
- Electrification: 750 V DC third rail
- Operating speed: 70 km/h (43 mph)

- Ui LRT
- Hangul: 우이신설선
- Revised Romanization: Uisinseolseon
- McCune–Reischauer: Uisinsŏlsŏn

The Ui LRT, referred to as the Ui-Sinseol LRT or Ui-Sinseol Line (우이신설선) in Korean, is a light metro which is part of Seoul Metropolitan Subway. It is a fully underground 11.4 km (7.1 mi) Light Rapid Transit line from Ui-dong to Sinseol-dong in northern Seoul which opened on September 2, 2017. The line, which is expected to carry 110,000 passengers a day, has 13 stations. It connects to Line 4 at Sungshin Women's University, Line 6 at Bomun and Lines 1 & 2 at Sinseol-dong. The last (northernmost) station is in Ui-dong, hence the name of the line. In 2019, the line carried 27 million passengers or about 75,000 people per day.

== Rolling Stock ==
The line uses a dedicated fleet of 18 trains built by Rotem, a member of Hyundai Motor Group. The trains are very similar to the ones previously built for the Busan–Gimhae Light Rail Transit. Each train consists of single 2-section unit with a Jacobs bogie in the center, similar to many street running high floor light rail vehicles such as the light rail rolling stock of Los Angeles, although it is powered by a bottom contact third rail as opposed to overhead wires most street railways use, making them more similar to the first three generations of Docklands Light Railway rolling stock in London. However, they only run as singles instead of the 2- and 3-car trains used on the DLR.

== Stations ==
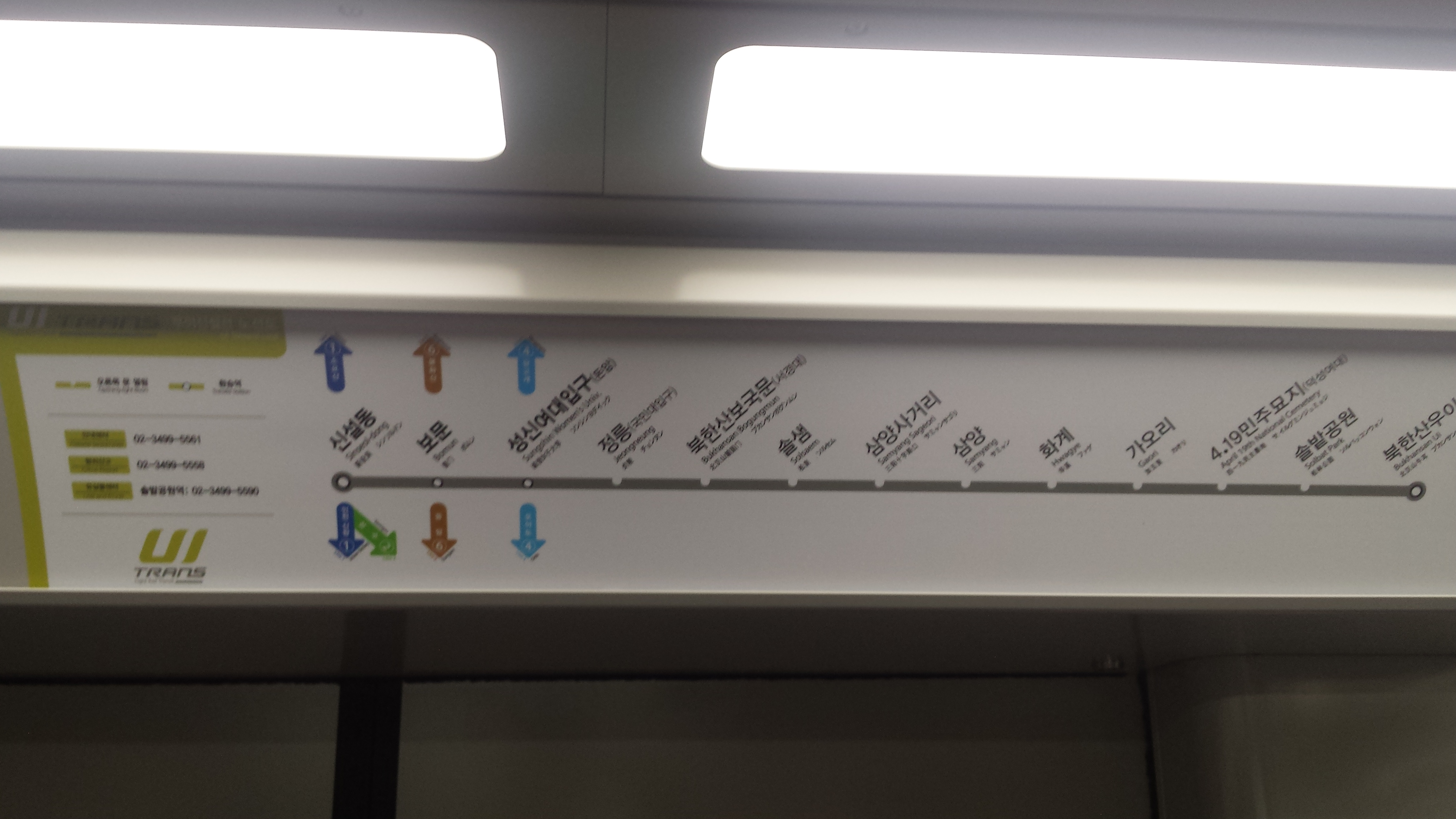
Ui LRT route map in all Ui LRT trains

All stations are located in Seoul.

Station Number (Note: Station Numbers were only used during construction and are not currently being used or written on signs.)	Station name		Transfer	Distance (km)		Location
Station Number	English	Hangul	Transfer	Station	Total	Location
L01	Bukhansan Ui (Doseonsa)	북한산우이 (도선사입구)		---		Gangbuk-gu
L02	Solbat Park	솔밭공원		0.8		Gangbuk-gu
L03	April 19th National Cemetery (Duksung Women's University)	4·19민주묘지 (덕성여대)		0.7	1.5	Gangbuk-gu
L04	Gaori	가오리		0.9	2.4	Gangbuk-gu
L05	Hwagye	화계		0.8	3.2	Gangbuk-gu
L06	Samyang	삼양		0.8	4.0	Gangbuk-gu
L07	Samyang Sageori	삼양사거리		0.7	4.7	Gangbuk-gu
L08	Solsaem	솔샘		0.8	5.5	Gangbuk-gu
L09	Bukhansan Bogungmun (Seokyong University)	북한산보국문 (서경대)		1.2	6.7	Seongbuk-gu
L10	Jeongneung	정릉 (국민대)		1.2	7.9	Seongbuk-gu
L11	Sungshin Women's University	성신여대입구 (돈암)	Seoul Subway Line 4	1.2	9.1	Seongbuk-gu
L12	Bomun	보문	Seoul Subway Line 6	0.9	10.0	Seongbuk-gu
L13	Sinseol-dong	신설동	Seoul Subway Line 1 Seoul Subway Line 2	1.0	11.0	Dongdaemun-gu

== Future Plans ==
The Seoul Metropolitan Government plans to open an extension for the Ui Sinseol Line. It will connect Solbat Park Station to Banghak Station and consist of three new stations.

== Ridership ==
Ui-Sinseol Line Ridership
Year	Ridership	Change (%)	Remarks
2026			
2025			
2024	27,470,000	▲1.9	
2023	26,960,000	▲8.2	
2022	24,906,000	▲12.4	
2021	22,156,000	▲4.9	
2020	21,121,000	▼22.7	
2019	27,310,000	▲6.5	
2018	25,634,000	▲237.6	
2017	7,592,000		Operations began on September 2, 2017
