= Ui-dong =

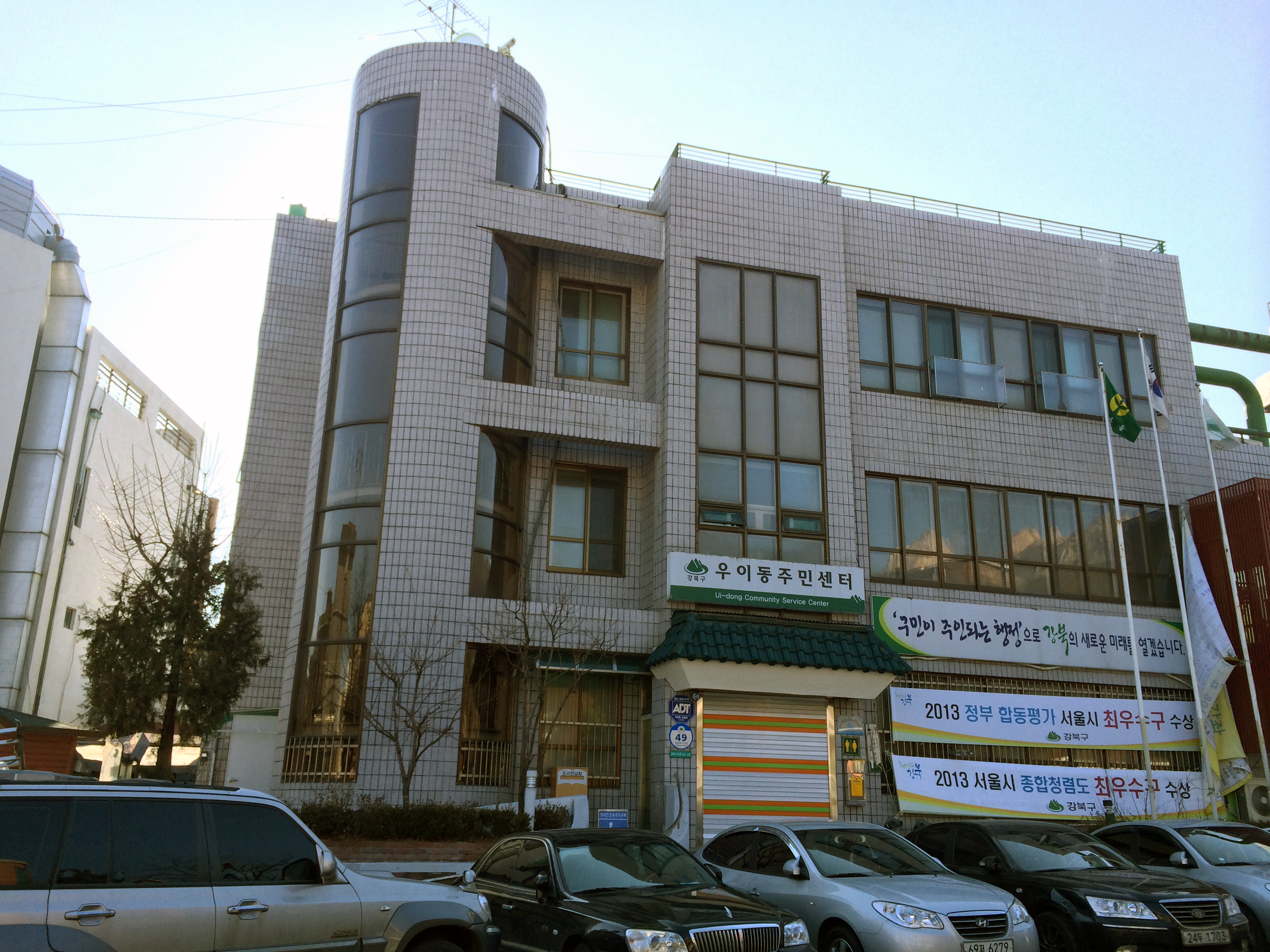
- Interactive map of Ui-dong
- Coordinates: 37°39′27″N 126°59′58″E
- Country: South Korea

Area
  - Total: 10.95 km^{2} (4.23 sq mi)

Population (2008)
  - Total: 21,718
  - Density: 2,061/km^{2} (5,340/sq mi)

Korean name
- Hangul: 우이동
- Hanja: 牛耳洞
- RR: Ui-dong
- MR: Ui-dong

Ui-dong (Korean: 우이동) is a dong (neighbourhood) of Gangbuk District, Seoul, South Korea. On June 30, 2008, former Suyu-4 dong is changed to the administrative dong. Thus Ui-dong can be called either legal dong or administrative dong.

== Etymology ==
Ui-dong is named after the geographical features of the area, where the tributary of the Han River, called Soguinai, flows through a valley, resembling the shape of a cow's ear. This area is also known for the peaks of Baegundae and Insubong in Bukhansan, which resemble the ears of a cow.

== See also ==
- Administrative divisions of South Korea
