= Bukhansan Ui station =

Station of the Seoul Metropolitan Subway

Coordinates: 37°34′28″N 127°01′22″E

L01 북한산우이 (도선사입구) Bukhansan Ui (Doseonsa)
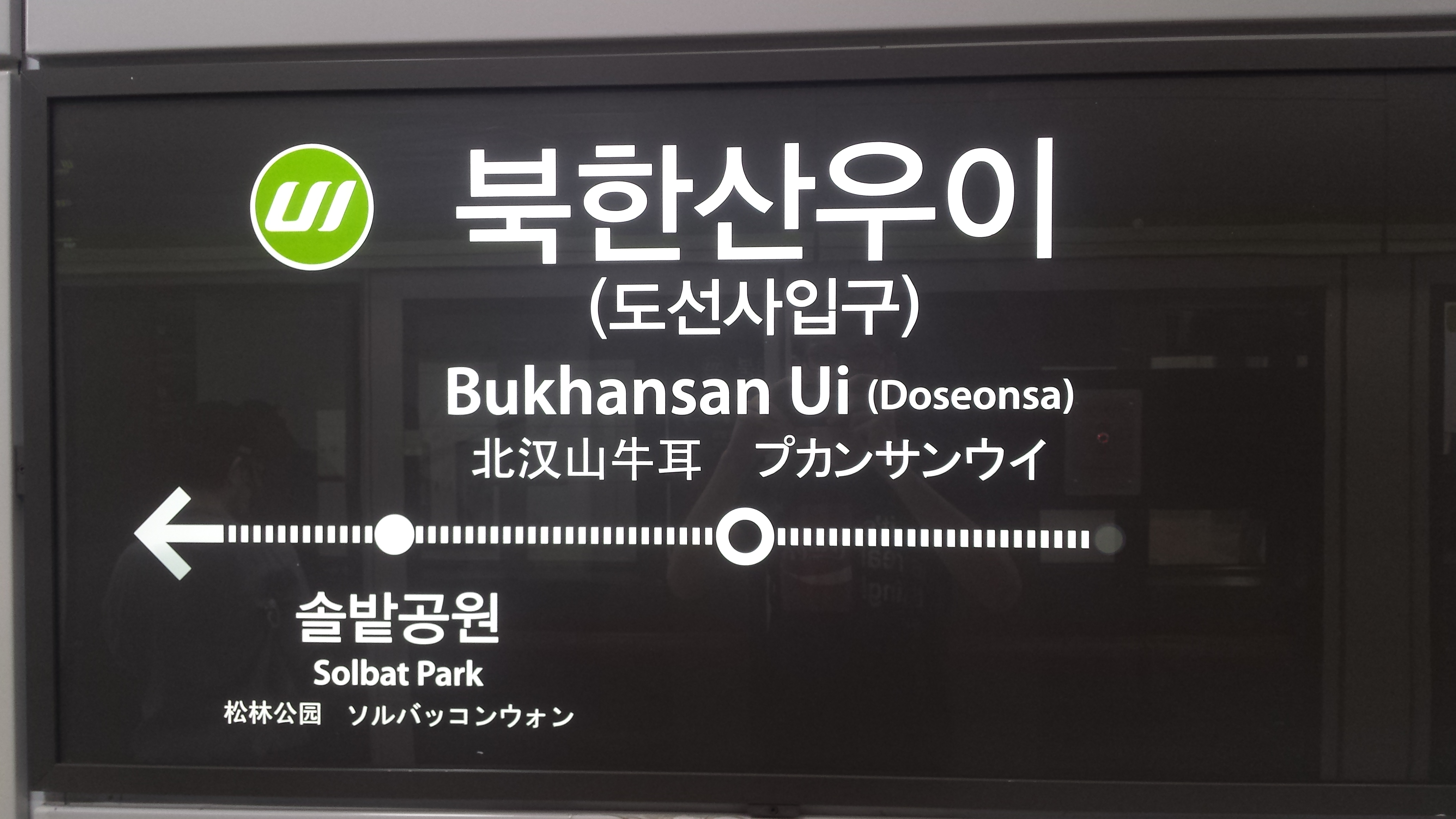

Korean name
- Hangul: 북한산우이역
- Hanja: 北漢山牛耳驛
- Revised Romanization: Bukhansanui-yeok
- McCune–Reischauer: Pukhansanui-yŏk

General information
- Location: 16-20 Ui-dong, Gangbuk-gu, Seoul
- Operator: UiTrans LRT Co., Ltd.
- Line: Ui LRT
- Platforms: 2
- Tracks: 2

Construction
- Structure type: Underground

History
- Opened: September 2, 2017

Services
Preceding station	Seoul Metropolitan Subway	Following station
Terminus	Ui LRT	Solbat Park towards Sinseol-dong
Location

Bukhansan Ui Station is a station on the Ui LRT located in Ui-dong, Gangbuk District, Seoul. It opened on the 2 September 2017. The tracks continue through the station to the Train Depot. The station is located next to the Ui LRT Control centre.

== Station layout ==
G	Street level	Exit

B1; Platforms	Side platform, doors will open on the right
B1; Platforms	Northbound	← Ui LRT Alighting Passengers Only
B1; Platforms	Southbound	Ui LRT toward Sinseol-dong (Solbat Park) →
B1; Platforms	Side platform, doors will open on the right

B2	Underpass

== Vicinity ==
- Exit 1 : Ui Amusement Park, Ganbuk-gu Towed Vehicles Storage Office, Ui-dong Food Village
- Exit 2 : Ui-dong Meeting Plaza, To Doseonsa Temple
