= Sinseol-dong station =

Station of the Seoul Metropolitan Subway

Coordinates: 37°34′28″N 127°01′22″E

신설동; Sinseol-dong
신설동; Sinseol-dong
L13
신설동
Sinseol-dong
- Station Platform (Line 2)

Korean name
- Hangul: 신설동역
- Hanja: 新設洞驛
- Revised Romanization: Sinseoldong-yeok
- McCune–Reischauer: Sinsŏltong-yŏk

General information
- Location: 97-75 Sinseol-dong, Wangsanno Jiha 1, Dongdaemun-gu, Seoul
- Operator: Seoul Metro; UiTrans LRT Co., Ltd.
- Lines: Line 1 Line 2 Ui LRT
- Platforms: 4
- Tracks: 4

Construction
- Structure type: Underground

History
- Opened: August 15, 1974; October 31, 1980; September 2, 2017

Passengers
- (Daily) Based on Jan-Dec of 2012. Line 1: 34,041; Line 2: 7,372
Services
Preceding station	Seoul Metropolitan Subway	Following station
Jegi-dong towards Kwangwoon University or Yeoncheon	Line 1	Dongmyo towards Incheon, Seodongtan or Sinchang
Jegi-dong towards Dongducheon	Line 1 Gyeongwon Express	Dongmyo towards Incheon
Jegi-dong towards Cheongnyangni	Line 1 Gyeongbu Express	Dongmyo towards Sinchang
Yongdu towards Seongsu	Line 2 Seongsu Branch	Terminus
Bomun towards Bukhansan Ui	Ui LRT	Terminus
Location

Sinseol-dong Station is a station on the Seoul Subway Line 1, the Seongsu Branch of Seoul Subway Line 2, and Ui LRT. There is a piece of track that connects the Line 1 and Line 2 stations, and Line 1 trains belonging to Seoul Metro are serviced at the Gunja Train Depot behind Yongdap Station using this connective track.

The B3 floor features an unused one-track platform. This used to be the original Line 2 platform. However, due to intermittent flooding, this platform was closed off, and a new platform on the B2 floor serves as the current Line 2 station. The track passing through this unused platform is currently used by Line 1 trains running light from Dongmyo Station to the Gunja Train Depot.

== Gallery ==
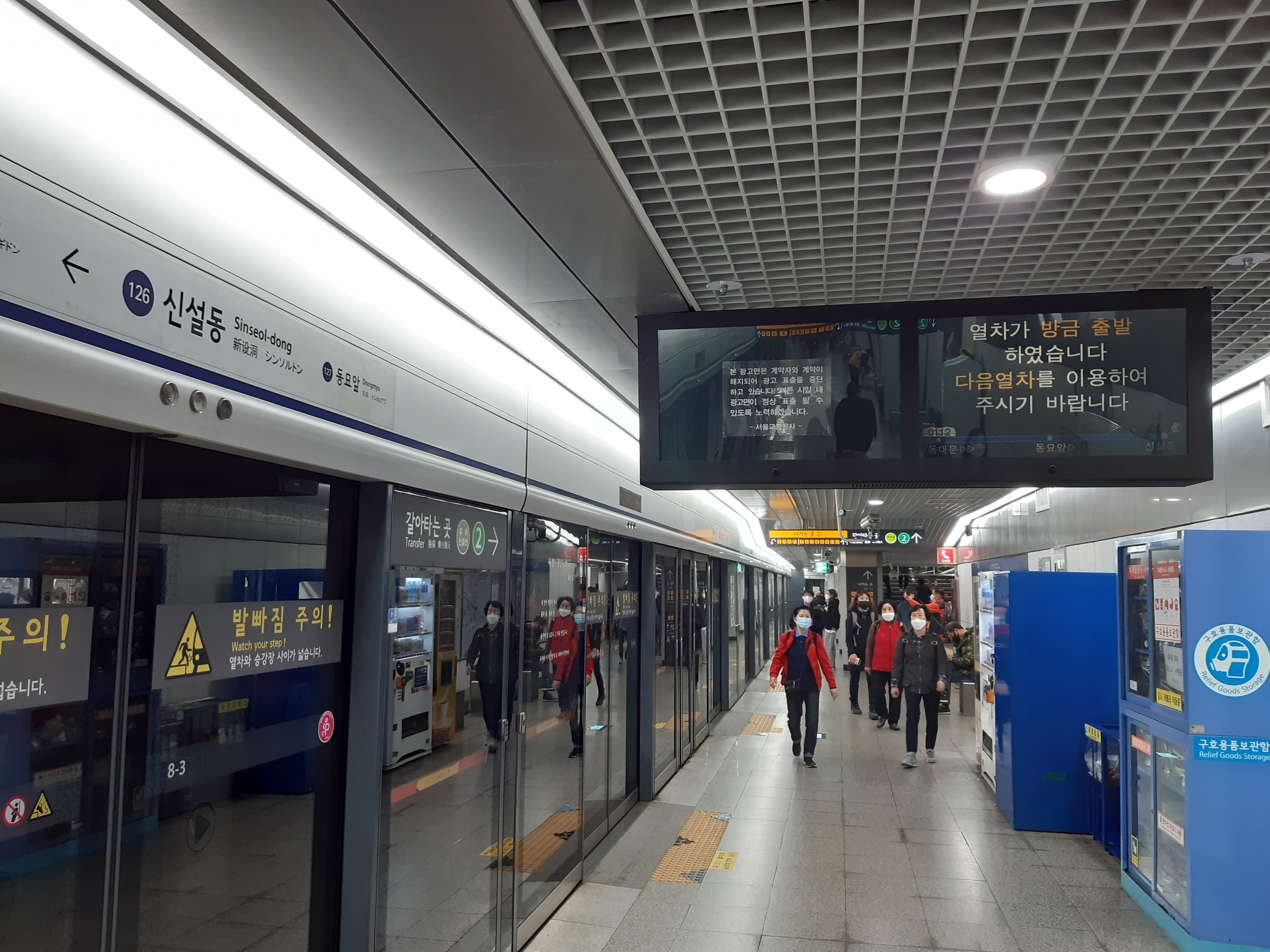
Line 1 platform

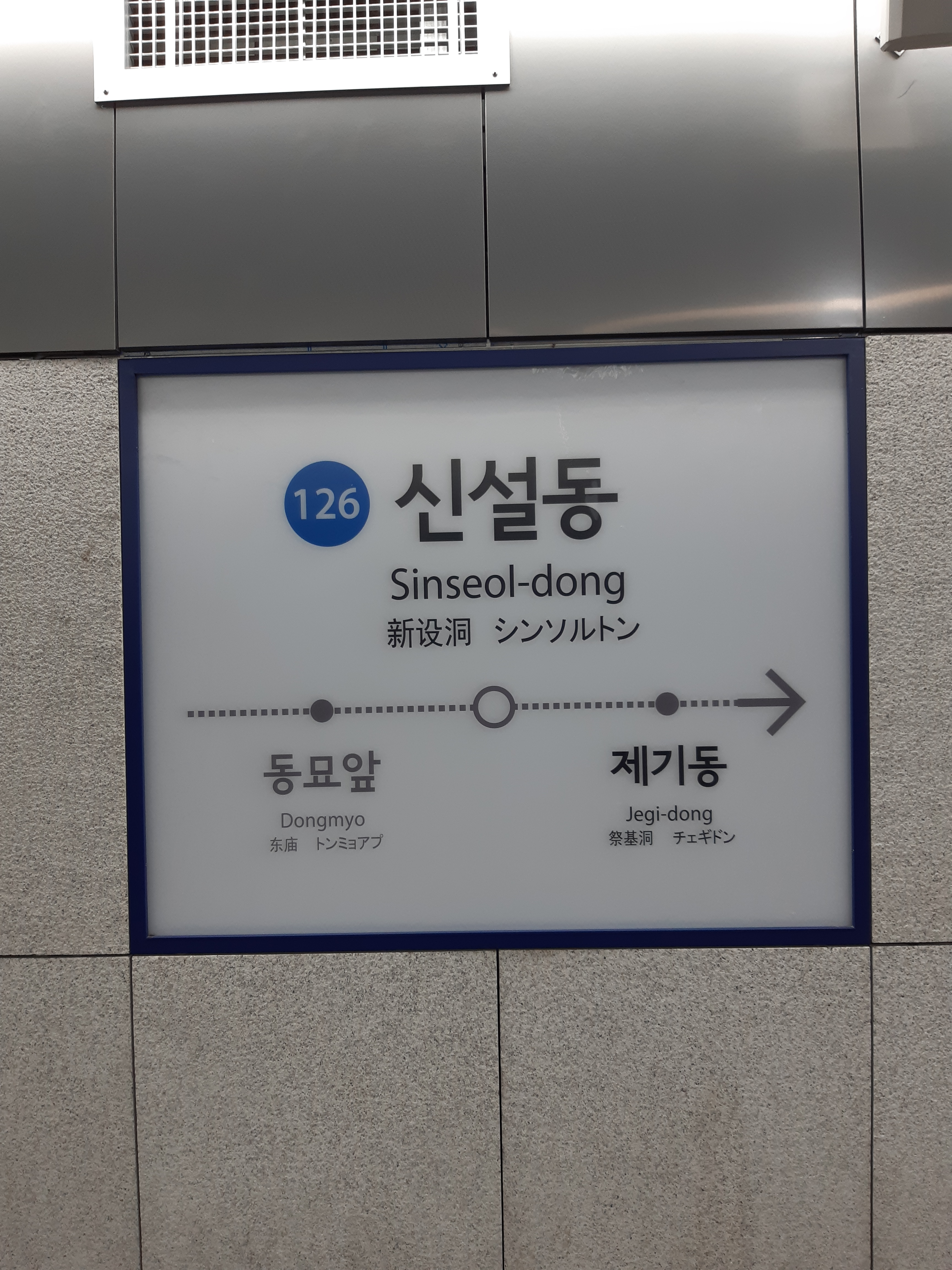
Line 1 station sign

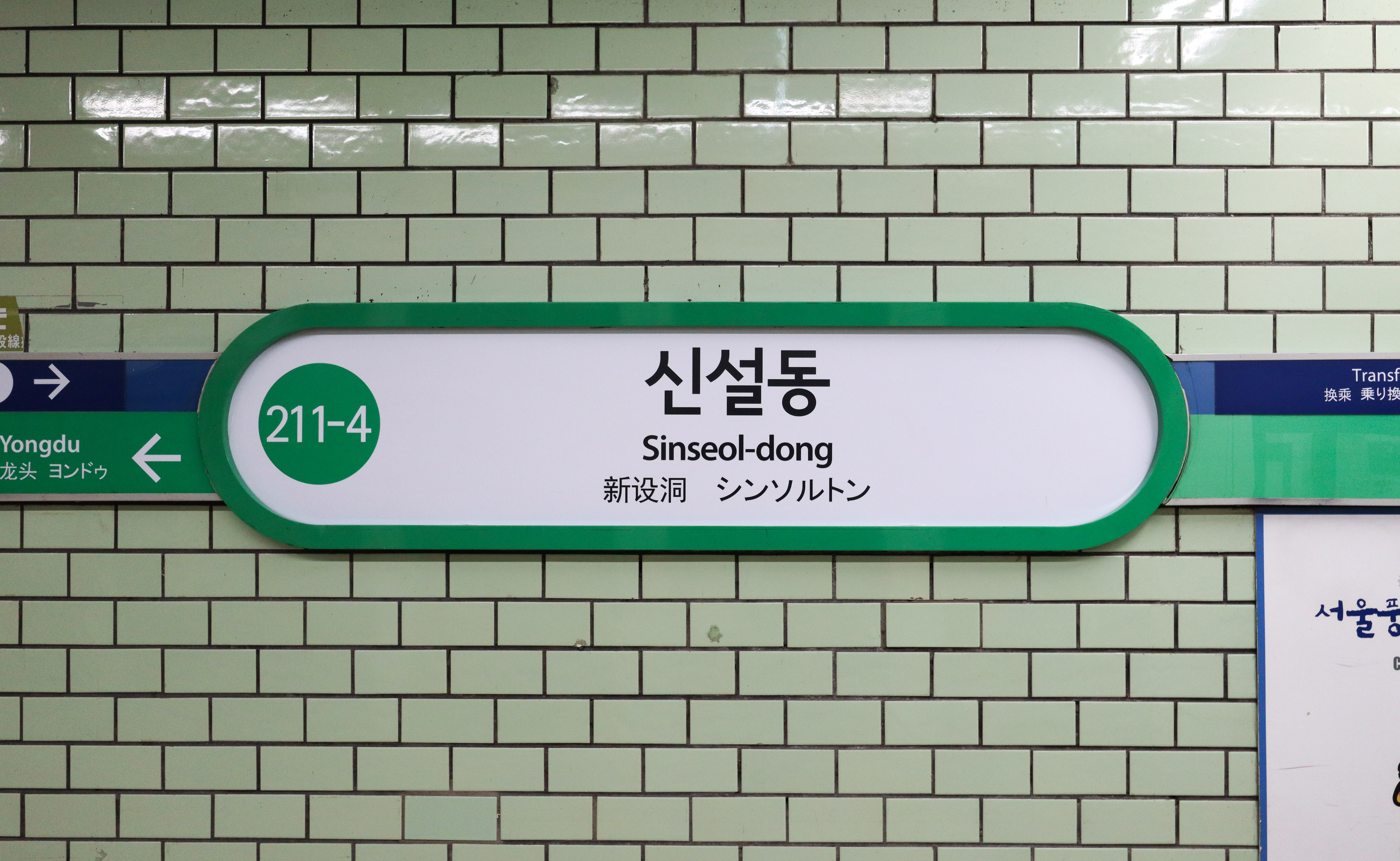
Line 2 station sign

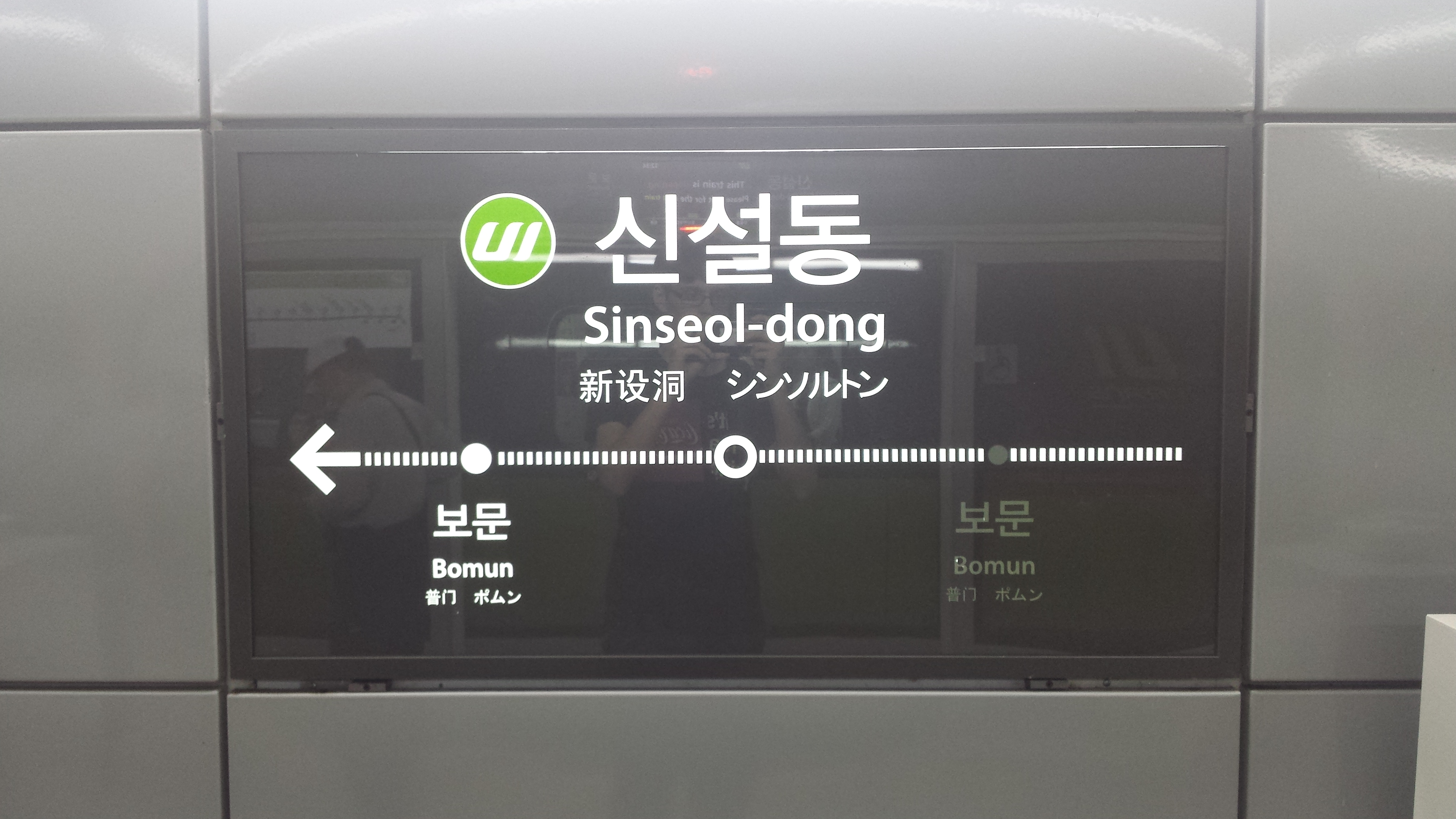
Ui LRT station sign
