= National Route 3 (South Korea) =

Road in South Korea

National Route 3
- 국도 제3호선

Route information
- Length: 1,096.3 km (681.2 mi)
- Existed: 31 August 1971–present

Major junctions
- South end: Namhae, South Gyeongsang
- North end: Chosan, North Pyongan Province (official); North Korean border at Woljeong-ri station, Cheorwon County (unofficial)

Location
- Country: South Korea

Highway system
- Highway systems of South Korea; Expressways; National; Local

National Route 3 is a national highway in South Korea connects Namhae to Chosan. Due to the separation of Korean Peninsula, it de facto ends in Cheorwon. It was established on 31 August 1971.

== History ==
=== 1970s ===
- On 31 December 1971, the section from Sindang-dong to Cheongnyangni opened. At the same time, Seongbuk station was renamed Kwangwoon University station.
- On 15 August 1974, the section from Seoul Station to Cheongnyangni began operation. At the same time, stations at Seoul Station, City Hall, Jonggak, Jongno 3-ga, and Jongno 5-ga opened.
- On 15 August 1974, the line was designated as part of Seoul Subway Line 1.
- On 10 March 1978, the section from Cheongnyangni to Seongbuk opened.

=== 1980s ===
- On 7 January 1981, the section from Seongbuk to Seokgye opened.
- On 22 December 1985, the section from Seokgye to Seongsu opened.
- On 2 September 1986, the section from Seongsu to Wangsimni opened.
- On 23 December 1988, the section from Wangsimni to Gunja opened.
- On 20 October 1989, the section from Gunja to Jungnang opened.

=== 1990s ===
- On 16 November 1991, the section from Jungnang to Mangu opened.
- On 1 April 1994, the section from Mangu to Seongbuk was transferred to Seoul Metropolitan Subway Line 4.
- On 15 November 1995, the section from Jungnang to Deokso opened.
- On 20 March 1996, the section from Deokso to Paldang opened.
- On 27 December 1996, the section from Paldang to Yangpyeong opened.
- On 16 December 1997, the section from Yangpyeong to Yongmun opened.
- On 15 January 1999, the section from Cheongnyangni to Seongbuk was transferred to Seoul Subway Line 6.
- On 1 August 2000, the section from Yongsan to Seongbuk was transferred to the Gyeongui–Jungang Line.

=== 2000s ===
- On 16 December 2005, the section from Seongbuk to Sangbong opened.
- On 20 December 2006, the section from Sangbong to Mangu opened.
- On 16 December 2007, the section from Mangu to Deokso opened.
- On 23 December 2008, the section from Deokso to Paldang opened.
- On 27 December 2008, the section from Paldang to Yongmun opened.

=== 2010s ===
- On 21 December 2010, the section from Yongsan to Seongbuk was formally transferred to the Gyeongui–Jungang Line.
- On 1 October 2011, the section from Cheongnyangni to Sangbong was transferred to Seoul Subway Line 6.
- On 15 December 2012, the section from Sangbong to Mangu was transferred to Seoul Subway Line 6.
- On 27 December 2013, the section from Mangu to Deokso was transferred to Seoul Subway Line 6.
- On 27 December 2014, the section from Deokso to Paldang was transferred to Seoul Subway Line 6.
- On 27 December 2015, the section from Paldang to Yongmun was transferred to Seoul Subway Line 6.
- On 27 December 2016, the section from Yongmun to Jipyeong opened.

=== 2020s ===
- On 30 December 2022, the section from Paldang to Yangpyeong was electrified.
- On 28 September 2023, the section from Yangpyeong to Yongmun was electrified.
- On 27 December 2024, the section from Yongmun to Jipyeong was electrified.
- On 30 June 2025, the section from Jipyeong to Wonju opened.

== Main stopovers ==
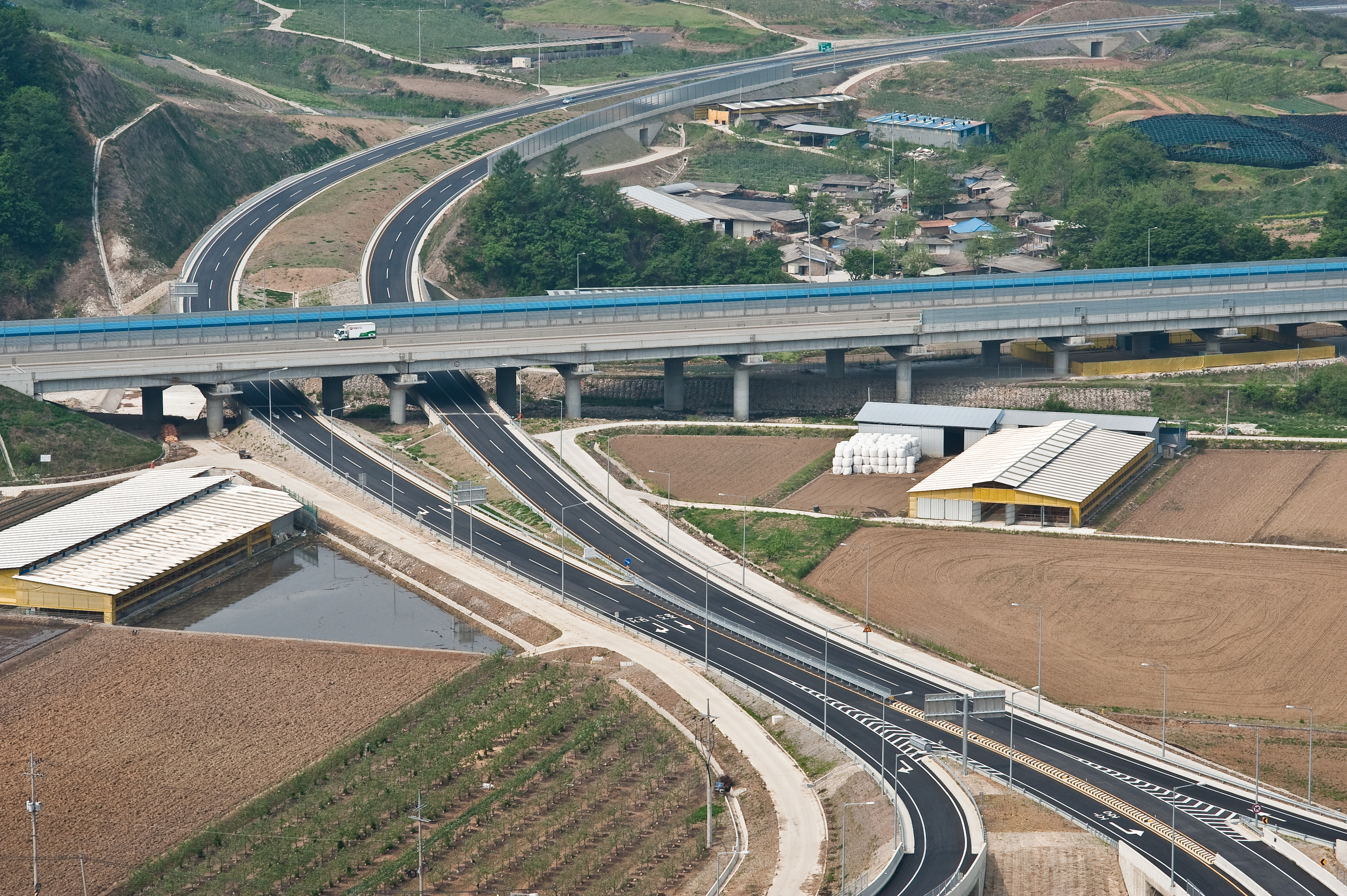
National Route 3 overpassing Jungbu Naeryuk Expressway at Goesan County

=== South Korea section ===
South Gyeongsang Province

- Namhae County - Sacheon - Jinju - Sancheong County - Hamyang County - Geochang County

North Gyeongsang Province

- Gimcheon - Sangju - Mungyeong - Sangju - Mungyeong

North Chungcheong Province

- Goesan County - Chungju - Eumseong County

Gyeonggi Province

- Icheon - Yeoju - Icheon - Gwangju - Seongnam

Seoul

- Songpa District - Jamsil Bridge - Gwangjin District - Jungnang District - Nowon District - Dobong District

Gyeonggi Province

- Uijeongbu - Yangju - Dongducheon - Yeoncheon County

Gangwon Province

- Cheorwon County

=== North Korea section ===
Kangwon Province

- Pyonggang County - Ichon County

Hwanghae Province

- Singye County - Koksan County

South Pyongan Province

- Yangdok County - Maengsan County - Nyongwon County

North Pyongan Province

- Huichon - Chosan County

== Major intersections ==
- (■): Motorway

IS: Intersection, IC: Interchange

=== South Gyeongsang Province ===
Name	Hangul name	Connection	Location		Note
Chojeon IS	초전삼거리	National Route 19; National Route 77 (Namhae-daero)	Namhae County	Mijo-myeon	National Route 77 overlap Terminus
Gainpo Health Center	가인포보건진료소		Namhae County	Mijo-myeon	National Route 77 overlap Terminus
Mulgeon-ri (Dokilma-eul) Samdong Elementary School Hanlyo Youth Hostel Gyeongnam Marine Science High School Namsu Middle School Samdong-myeon Welfare Center	물건리 (독일마을) 삼동초등학교 한려유스호스텔 경남해양과학고등학교 남수중학교 삼동면종합복지회관		Namhae County	Samdong-myeon	National Route 77 overlap Terminus
Jijok IS	지족삼거리	Prefectural Route 1024 (Sami-ro)	Namhae County	Samdong-myeon	National Route 77 overlap Prefectural Route 1024 overlap
Changseon Bridge	창선교		Namhae County	Samdong-myeon	National Route 77 overlap Prefectural Route 1024 overlap
Changseon Bridge			Namhae County	Changseon-myeon	National Route 77 overlap Prefectural Route 1024 overlap
Jijok IS	지족삼거리	Prefectural Route 1024 (Seobu-ro)	Namhae County	Changseon-myeon	National Route 77 overlap Prefectural Route 1024 overlap
Dangjeo Bridge	당저교	Prefectural Route 1024 (Heungseon-ro); Changseon-ro 66beon-gil	Namhae County	Changseon-myeon	National Route 77 overlap
No name	(이름 없음)	Yuldo-ro	Namhae County	Changseon-myeon	National Route 77 overlap
Danhang IS	단항사거리	Prefectural Route 1024 (Seobu-ro); Dongbu-daero 2964beon-gil	Namhae County	Changseon-myeon	National Route 77 overlap
Changseon Bridge	창선대교		Namhae County	Changseon-myeon	National Route 77 overlap
Changseon Bridge			Sacheon City	Dongseo-dong	National Route 77 overlap
Neuk-do	늑도	Neukdo-gil	Sacheon City	Dongseo-dong	National Route 77 overlap
Neukdo Bridge	늑도대교		Sacheon City	Dongseo-dong	National Route 77 overlap
Choyang-do	초양도	Choyang-gil	Sacheon City	Dongseo-dong	National Route 77 overlap
Choyang Bridge	초양대교		Sacheon City	Dongseo-dong	National Route 77 overlap
Mogae-do	모개도		Sacheon City	Dongseo-dong	National Route 77 overlap
Samcheonpo Bridge	삼천포대교		Sacheon City	Dongseo-dong	National Route 77 overlap
Daebang IS	대방 교차로	National Route 77; Prefectural Route 58 (Gaksan-ro)	Sacheon City	Dongseo-dong	National Route 77 ovelrap Prefectural Route 58, 1003 overlap
Haean IS	해안 교차로	Noeul-gil	Sacheon City	Dongseo-dong	Prefectural Route 58, 1003 overlap
Siran IS	실안 교차로	Prefectural Route 1003 (Haeangwangwang-ro)	Sacheon City	Dongseo-dong	Prefectural Route 58, 1003 overlap
Gaksan Tunnel	각산터널		Sacheon City	Dongseo-dong	Prefectural Route 58 overlap Approximately 710m
Gaksan Tunnel			Sacheon City	Namyang-dong	Prefectural Route 58 overlap Approximately 710m
Mochung IS	모충 교차로	Prefectural Route 1003 (Haeangwangwang-ro)	Sacheon City	Namyang-dong	Prefectural Route 58 overlap
Songpo 1 Bridge	송포1교		Sacheon City	Namyang-dong	Prefectural Route 58 overlap
Songpo IS	송포 교차로	Prefectural Route 1003 (Samcheonpodaegyo-ro); Songpogongdan-gil	Sacheon City	Namyang-dong	Prefectural Route 58, 1003 overlap
Norye IS	노례 교차로	Miryong-gil	Sacheon City	Namyang-dong	Prefectural Route 58, 1003 overlap
Jumun IS	주문 교차로	Prefectural Route 58; Prefectural Route 1003 (Sacheondaegyo-ro)	Sacheon City	Yonghyeon-myeon	Prefectural Route 58, 1003 overlap
Geummun IS	금문 교차로	Sicheong-ro; Geummun-gil; Bugok 3-gil	Sacheon City	Yonghyeon-myeon	
Sacheon Chamber of Commerce & Industry	사천상공회의소		Sacheon City	Yonghyeon-myeon	
Songji IS	송지 교차로	Jangsong 1-gil Jangsong 2-gil	Sacheon City	Yonghyeon-myeon	
Onjeong IS	온정 교차로	Onjeong 1-gil Onjeong 2-gil	Sacheon City	Yonghyeon-myeon	
Seonjin 2 IS (Singi IC Bridge)	선진2 교차로 (신기IC교)	Seonjingongwon-gil	Sacheon City	Yonghyeon-myeon	
Seonjin 1 IS	선진1 교차로	Seokgeori-gil; Seonjin-gil	Sacheon City	Yonghyeon-myeon	
Jukcheon Bridge	죽천교		Sacheon City	Yonghyeon-myeon	
Jukcheon Bridge			Sacheon City	Sanam-myeon	
Chojeon IS	초전 교차로	Prefectural Route 1001 (Sanam-ro) (Gongdan 3-ro)	Sacheon City	Sanam-myeon	
Wolseong IS	월성 교차로	Gongdan 2-ro	Sacheon City	Sanam-myeon	
Yucheon IS	유천 교차로	Gongdan 1-ro	Sacheon City	Sanam-myeon	
Saju IS	사주 교차로	Jinsam-ro; Yucheon-gil	Sacheon City	Sacheon-eup	
Sacheon 2 Bridge	사천2교		Sacheon City	Sacheon-eup	
Suseok 5-ri IS	수석5리사거리	Oksan-ro; Hanggong-ro	Sacheon City	Sacheon-eup	
Suseok IS	수석삼거리	Prefectural Route 30; Prefectural Route 1002 (Sacheoneupseong-ro)	Sacheon City	Sacheon-eup	
Suseok IS	수석사거리	Jinsam-ro; Gansan 2-gil	Sacheon City	Sacheon-eup	
Airport IS (Sacheon Airport)	공항삼거리 (사천공항)		Sacheon City	Sacheon-eup	
Sacheon station (Closed)	사천역 (폐역)		Sacheon City	Sacheon-eup	
Baechun IS	배춘삼거리	National Route 33 (Sangjeong-daero)	Sacheon City	Sacheon-eup	National Route 33 overlap
Suseok Bridge	수석교		Sacheon City	Sacheon-eup	National Route 33 overlap
Suseok Bridge			Sacheon City	Chukdong-myeon	National Route 33 overlap
No name	(이름 없음)	Seosam-ro	Sacheon City	Chukdong-myeon	National Route 33 overlap
Ungye IS	운계 교차로	Prefectural Route 1002 (Ungye-gil)	Sacheon City	Chukdong-myeon	National Route 33 overlap Prefectural Route 1002 overlap
Sacheon IC IS	사천IC사거리	Prefectural Route 1002 (Seosam-ro)	Sacheon City	Chukdong-myeon	National Route 33 overlap Prefectural Route 1002 overlap
Sacheon IC IS (Sacheon IC)	사천IC 교차로 (사천 나들목)	Namhae Expressway	Sacheon City	Chukdong-myeon	National Route 33 overlap
Yeha IS	예하 교차로	Gangju-gil	Jinju City	Jeongchon-myeon	National Route 33 overlap
Yeha 1 Overpass	예하1육교	Daechuk-gil	Jinju City	Jeongchon-myeon	National Route 33 overlap
Jeongchon IS	정촌 교차로	Jeongchon-ro	Jinju City	Jeongchon-myeon	National Route 33 overlap
Hwagae IS	화개 교차로	National Route 2 (Jeongchon Bypass Road); Jinju-daero	Jinju City	Jeongchon-myeon	National Route 2, National Route 33 overlap
Naedong IS	내동 교차로	National Route 2 (Gyeongseo-daero)	Jinju City	Naedong-myeon	National Route 2, National Route 33 overlap
(South of Namgang Bridge)	(남강대교 남단)	Manggyeong-ro	Jinju City	Naedong-myeon	Namgang Bridge; National Route 33 overlap
Namgang Bridge (Huimang Bridge)	남강대교 (희망교)		Jinju City	Naedong-myeon	Namgang Bridge; National Route 33 overlap
Namgang Bridge (Huimang Bridge)			Jinju City	Pyeonggeo-dong	Namgang Bridge; National Route 33 overlap
Huimang Bridge IS	희망교 교차로	Namgang-ro	Jinju City	Pyeonggeo-dong	Namgang Bridge; National Route 33 overlap
No name	(이름 없음)	Pyeonggeo-ro; Saepyeonggeo-ro	Jinju City	Pyeonggeo-dong	National Route 33 overlap
10th Square IS	10호광장 교차로	Jinyangho-ro	Jinju City	Pyeonggeo-dong	National Route 33 overlap
Daesa IS	대사 교차로	Seojang-daero; Sunhwan-ro 676 beon-gil	Jinju City	Ihyeon-dong	National Route 33 overlap
Nabulcheon Bridge	나불천교		Jinju City	Ihyeon-dong	National Route 33 overlap
Myeongseok IS	명석 교차로	National Route 33 (Sunhwan-ro); Jinju-daero	Jinju City	Ihyeon-dong	National Route 33 overlap
Myeongseok Tunnel	명석터널		Jinju City	Ihyeon-dong	Approximately 345m
Myeongseok Tunnel			Jinju City	Myeongseok-myeon	Approximately 345m
Usu IS	우수 교차로	Nabul-ro; Panmun-ro	Jinju City	Myeongseok-myeon	
Daepyeong IS	대평진입로	Daepyeong-ro	Jinju City	Myeongseok-myeon	
Oeyul IS	외율 교차로	Prefectural Route 1049 (Seongcheol-ro); Oeyul-gil	Jinju City	Myeongseok-myeon	
Donaegogae	도내고개		Jinju City	Myeongseok-myeon	
Donaegogae			Sancheong County	Sinan-myeon	
Tohyeon Bridge	토현교		Sancheong County	Sinan-myeon	
Hajeong IS	하정 교차로	National Route 20 (Jirisan-daero)	Sancheong County	Sinan-myeon	
Hajeong Overpass	하정육교		Sancheong County	Sinan-myeon	
Sanseong 2 Bridge	산성2교	Jungchongaljeon-ro	Sancheong County	Sinan-myeon	
6.25 Veterans Memorial	6.25참전기념비		Sancheong County	Sinan-myeon	
Simgeo Bridge	심거교	Hoam-ro; Sancheong-daero 1212beon-gil	Sancheong County	Sinan-myeon	
Simgeo Bridge		Hoam-ro; Sancheong-daero 1212beon-gil	Sancheong County	Sancheong-eup	
Oejeong IS	외정 교차로	Prefectural Route 60 (Jeonggokcheokji-ro)	Sancheong County	Sancheong-eup	Prefectural Route 60 overlap
Oejeong Bridge	외정교	Muransil-ro	Sancheong County	Sancheong-eup	Prefectural Route 60 overlap
Ssalgogae	쌀고개	Chinhwangyeong-ro 2720beon-gil	Sancheong County	Sancheong-eup	
Sancheong IS	산청 교차로	National Route 59; Prefectural Route 60 (Chinhwangyeong-ro); Prefectural Route 1026 (Sansu-ro)	Sancheong County	Sancheong-eup	
Huitigogae	희티고개		Sancheong County	Sancheong-eup	
Huitigogae			Sancheong County	Obu-myeon	
Yangchon IS	양촌 교차로	Prefectural Route 1026 (Odong-ro)	Sancheong County	Obu-myeon	
Obu IS	오부 교차로	Sansu-ro	Sancheong County	Saengcho-myeon	
Sinyeon Tunnel	신연터널		Sancheong County	Saengcho-myeon	Approximately 320m
Saengrim Bridge	생림교		Sancheong County	Saengcho-myeon	
Saengcho IS	생초 교차로	Sansu-ro	Sancheong County	Saengcho-myeon	North-bound only
Saengcho Bridge	생초교		Sancheong County	Saengcho-myeon	
Goeup IS	고읍 교차로	Prefectural Route 1034 (Gyeongho-ro)	Sancheong County	Saengcho-myeon	Prefectural Route 1034 overlap
Goeup Bridge	고읍교		Sancheong County	Saengcho-myeon	Prefectural Route 1034 overlap
Saengcho Tunnel	생초터널		Sancheong County	Saengcho-myeon	Prefectural Route 34 overlap Approximately 906m
Saengcho Tunnel			Hamyang County	Sudong-myeon	Prefectural Route 34 overlap Approximately 906m
Bontong Bridge	본통교		Hamyang County	Sudong-myeon	Prefectural Route 1034 overlap
Gangjeong IS	강정 교차로	Sansu-ro	Hamyang County	Sudong-myeon	Prefectural Route 1034 overlap
Bontong IS	본통 교차로	Prefectural Route 1034 (Cheonwangbong-ro)	Hamyang County	Sudong-myeon	Prefectural Route 1034 overlap
Daedong IS	대동 교차로	Sudong 1-gil	Hamyang County	Sudong-myeon	
Hwasan 1 Bridge Hwasan 2 Bridge Sudong Bridge	화산1교 화산2교 수동교		Hamyang County	Sudong-myeon	
Sudong IS	수동 교차로	Sudong 1-gil	Hamyang County	Sudong-myeon	
Wonpyeong IS	원평사거리	Gongbae-gil; Saneopdanji-gil	Hamyang County	Sudong-myeon	
Namgye IS	남계삼거리	Sudong 2-gil	Hamyang County	Sudong-myeon	
Gura IS	구라사거리	Jigokchangchon-gil	Hamyang County	Sudong-myeon	
Donggu IS	동구삼거리	Guradonggu-gil	Hamyang County	Sudong-myeon	
Namhyo IS	남효삼거리	Namhyojungbang-ro	Hamyang County	Sudong-myeon	
Naebaek IS	내백 교차로	Suan-gil	Hamyang County	Sudong-myeon	
Sangbaek IS	상백 교차로	Suan-gil	Hamyang County	Anui-myeon	
Anui IS	안의 교차로	National Route 24 (Hamyang-ro)	Hamyang County	Anui-myeon	National Route 24 overlap
Seokcheon IS	석천 교차로	Hwangma-ro	Hamyang County	Anui-myeon	National Route 24 overlap
Geumcheon IS	금천 교차로	Gwangpung-ro; Anuidojanggol-gil	Hamyang County	Anui-myeon	National Route 24 overlap
Gyobuk IS	교북 교차로	National Route 26 (Yuksimnyeong-ro)	Hamyang County	Anui-myeon	National Route 24, National Route 26 overlap
Yongchu IS	용추 교차로	Yongchugyegok-ro	Hamyang County	Anui-myeon	National Route 24, National Route 26 overlap
Samsan IS	삼산 교차로	Geoan-ro	Hamyang County	Anui-myeon	National Route 24, National Route 26 overlap
Baraegijae	바래기재		Hamyang County	Anui-myeon	National Route 24, National Route 26 overlap
Baraegijae			Geochang County	Mari-myeon	National Route 24, National Route 26 overlap
Samgeori IS	삼거리 교차로	Geoan-ro	Geochang County	Mari-myeon	National Route 24, National Route 26 overlap
Jidong IS	지동 교차로	National Route 37 (Geoan-ro)	Geochang County	Mari-myeon	National Route 24, National Route 26, National Route 37 overlap
Malheul IS	말흘 교차로	Geoan-ro	Geochang County	Mari-myeon	National Route 24, National Route 26, National Route 37 overlap
Jangbaek Tunnel	장백터널		Geochang County	Mari-myeon	National Route 24, National Route 26, National Route 37 overlap Approximately 639m
Jangbaek Tunnel			Geochang County	Geochang-eup	National Route 24, National Route 26, National Route 37 overlap Approximately 639m
Geoyeol Tunnel	거열터널		Geochang County	Geochang-eup	National Route 24, National Route 26, National Route 37 overlap Approximately 544m
Songjeong IS	송정 교차로	National Route 24; National Route 26; National Route 37 (Geoham-daero); Geoan-ro	Geochang County	Geochang-eup	National Route 24, National Route 26, National Route 37 overlap
Songjeong Bridge	송정교		Geochang County	Geochang-eup	
Gaji IS	가지 교차로	Geoyeol-ro 4-gil	Geochang County	Geochang-eup	
Jukdong IS	죽동 교차로	Dongbyeon-gil; Jinae 2-gil	Geochang County	Geochang-eup	
Jusang Tunnel	주상터널		Geochang County	Geochang-eup	Approximately 565m
Jusang Tunnel			Geochang County	Jusang-myeon	Approximately 565m
Dopyeong IS	도평 교차로	Prefectural Route 1089 (Jugok-ro)	Geochang County	Jusang-myeon	
Jusang IS	주상 교차로	Dangdaegogae-gil	Geochang County	Jusang-myeon	
Ungyang Elementary School Ungyang-myeon Office Ungyang Bus stop	웅양초등학교 웅양면사무소 웅양정류소		Geochang County	Ungyang-myeon	
Gangcheon IS	강천삼거리	Prefectural Route 1099 (Uduryeong-ro)	Geochang County	Ungyang-myeon	
Gunam-ri	군암리	Goung-gil	Geochang County	Ungyang-myeon	
Baeteojae (Baetigogae)	배터재(배티고개)		Geochang County	Ungyang-myeon	Continuation into North Gyeongsang Province

=== North Gyeongsang Province ===
Name	Hangul name	Connection	Location		Note
Baeteojae (Baetigogae)	배터재 (배티고개)		Gimcheon City	Daedeok-myeon	South Gyeongsang Province - North Gyeongsang Province border line
(Daedong)	(대동)	Prefectural Route 1099 (Uduryeong-ro)	Gimcheon City	Daedeok-myeon	
Gwangi IS	관기삼거리	National Route 30 (Daedeok-ro)	Gimcheon City	Daedeok-myeon	National Route 30 overlap
Daedeok-myeon Office	대덕면사무소		Gimcheon City	Daedeok-myeon	National Route 30 overlap
Daedeok IS	대덕삼거리	National Route 30 (Jeungsan-ro)	Gimcheon City	Daedeok-myeon	National Route 30 overlap
Jungsan Bridge	중산교		Gimcheon City	Daedeok-myeon	
(Soksu)	(속수)	Prefectural Route 903 (Jeungsan 1-ro)	Gimcheon City	Jirye-myeon	Prefectural Route 903 overlap
Sinpyeong IS	신평 교차로	Prefectural Route 903 (Namgimcheon-daero); Gwandeok-gil	Gimcheon City	Jirye-myeon	Prefectural Route 903 overlap
Sinpyeong 1 Bridge Sinpyeong 2 Bridge Jirye 1 Bridge Jirye 2 Bridge	신평1교 신평2교 지례1교 지례2교		Gimcheon City	Jirye-myeon	
Sangbu IS	상부 교차로	Namgimcheon-daero	Gimcheon City	Jirye-myeon	
Jirye 1 IS	지례1 교차로	Jangteo 1-gil	Gimcheon City	Jirye-myeon	
Jirye 2 IS	지례2 교차로	Hyanggyo-gil	Gimcheon City	Jirye-myeon	
Jirye 3 IS	지례3 교차로	Namgimcheon-daero; Jangteo-gil	Gimcheon City	Jirye-myeon	
Gyori IS	교리 교차로	Namgimcheon-daero	Gimcheon City	Jirye-myeon	
Mureung 1 Bridge Bangsan Bridge	무릉1교 방산교		Gimcheon City	Guseong-myeon	
Mipyeong IS	미평 교차로	Namgimcheon-daero; Mipyeong 1-gil	Gimcheon City	Guseong-myeon	
Jipyeong 1 IS	지평1 교차로	Namgimcheon-daero; Mipyeong 2-gil	Gimcheon City	Guseong-myeon	
Jipyeong 2 IS	지평2 교차로	Namgimcheon-daero	Gimcheon City	Guseong-myeon	
Guseong Bridge	구성교		Gimcheon City	Guseong-myeon	
Undong IS (Undong 1 Bridge)	운동 교차로 (운동1교)	Mipyeong 3-gil	Gimcheon City	Guseong-myeon	
Mipyeong Tunnel	미평터널		Gimcheon City	Guseong-myeon	Approximately 405m
Gwangpyeong Bridge	광평교		Gimcheon City	Guseong-myeon	
Songjuk IS	송죽 교차로	Namgimcheon-daero	Gimcheon City	Guseong-myeon	
Songjuk Tunnel	송죽터널		Gimcheon City	Guseong-myeon	Approximately 266m
Songjuk Bridge	송죽교		Gimcheon City	Guseong-myeon	
Goegok IS	괴곡 교차로	Namgimcheon-daero; Gwangmyeong-gil; Gwangmyeong 1-gil	Gimcheon City	Guseong-myeon	
Daebang Tunnel	대방터널		Gimcheon City	Guseong-myeon	Approximately 207m
Hagang 1 Bridge	하강1교		Gimcheon City	Guseong-myeon	
Hagang IS	하강 교차로	Namgimcheon-daero; Hagang-gil	Gimcheon City	Guseong-myeon	
Hagang 2 Bridge	하강2교		Gimcheon City	Guseong-myeon	
Yanggeum IS	양금 교차로	Namgimcheon-daero	Gimcheon City	Yanggeum-dong	
Gimcheon Joonang High School	김천중앙고등학교		Gimcheon City	Yanggeum-dong	
(North of Joma Bridge)	(조마교 북단)	Prefectural Route 903 (Joma-ro)	Gimcheon City	Yanggeum-dong	
Yangcheon IS	양천 교차로	Yanggeum-ro	Gimcheon City	Yanggeum-dong	
Yanggam Bridge	양감교		Gimcheon City	Yanggeum-dong	
Yanggam Bridge			Gimcheon City	Gamcheon-myeon	
Gamcheon IS	감천 교차로	National Route 59 (Geumgam-ro)	Gimcheon City	Gamcheon-myeon	
Gamcheon Tunnel	감천터널		Gimcheon City	Gamcheon-myeon	Approximately 895m
Gamcheon Tunnel			Gimcheon City	Jijwa-dong	Approximately 895m
Deokgok 1 Bridge	덕곡1교		Gimcheon City	Jijwa-dong	
Deokgok Tunnel	덕곡차도터널		Gimcheon City	Jijwa-dong	Approximately 65m
Deokgok Tunnel			Gimcheon City	Nongso-myeon	Approximately 65m
Deokgok 2 Bridge	덕곡2교		Gimcheon City	Nongso-myeon	
Nongso IS (Nongso IC Overpass)	농소 교차로 (농소IC고가)	National Route 4 (Yeongnam-daero)	Gimcheon City	Nongso-myeon	
Wolgok 2 IS (Wolgok Bridge)	월곡2 교차로 (월곡교)	Yongsi-gil	Gimcheon City	Nongso-myeon	
Yulgokcheon 1 Bridge	율곡천1교		Gimcheon City	Nongso-myeon	
Yulgokcheon 1 Bridge			Gimcheon City	Yulgok-dong	
Hyeoksin Underpass 1	혁신지하차도1		Gimcheon City	Yulgok-dong	
Hyeoksindosi IS (Heoksin Underpass 2)	혁신도시 교차로 (혁신지하차도2)	Unnam-ro	Gimcheon City	Yulgok-dong	
East Gimcheon IC	동김천 나들목	Gyeongbu Expressway	Gimcheon City	Nam-myeon	
Seobu IS	서부 교차로	National Route 59 (Hwangyeong-ro) (Gimseon-ro)	Gimcheon City	Gaeryeong-myeon	
Deokchon IS	덕촌 교차로	Prefectural Route 913 (Gammun-ro)	Gimcheon City	Gaeryeong-myeon	
Deokchon IS		Prefectural Route 913 (Gammun-ro)	Gimcheon City	Eomo-myeon	
Eomo IS	어모 교차로	Sicheong-ro	Gimcheon City	Eomo-myeon	
Okyul IS	옥율 교차로	Eomo-ro	Gimcheon City	Eomo-myeon	
Doam IS	도암 교차로	Doam-gil	Gimcheon City	Eomo-myeon	
Gurye IS	구례 교차로	Eomo-ro; Jakjeom-ro	Gimcheon City	Eomo-myeon	
Yujeom IS	유점 교차로	Eomo-ro	Gimcheon City	Eomo-myeon	
Geochang IS	거창 교차로	Namsangju-ro	Sangju City	Gongseong-myeon	
Gongseong IS	공성 교차로	Prefectural Route 68 (Ungsan-ro)	Sangju City	Gongseong-myeon	
Gongseong Bridge	공성교		Sangju City	Gongseong-myeon	
Choo IS	초오 교차로	Namsangju-ro	Sangju City	Gongseong-myeon	
Cheongni IS	청리 교차로	Magonggongdan-ro	Sangju City	Gongseong-myeon	
Cheongni IS		Magonggongdan-ro	Sangju City	Cheongni-myeon	
No name	(이름 미상)	Magonggongdan-ro	Sangju City	Cheongni-myeon	
Cheongni Bridge	청리교		Sangju City	Cheongni-myeon	
Cheongni Tunnel	청리터널		Sangju City	Cheongni-myeon	Approximately 960m
Yangchon IS	양촌 교차로	Namsangju-ro	Sangju City	Sinheung-dong	
Yangchon Bridge	양촌교		Sangju City	Sinheung-dong	
South Sangju IC	남상주 나들목	Dangjin-Yeongdeok Expressway	Sangju City	Sinheung-dong	
Socheon 2 Bridge	소천2교		Sangju City	Sinheung-dong	
Kyungpook National University Sangju Campus	경북대학교 상주캠퍼스		Sangju City	Sinheung-dong	
No name	(이름 없음)	Sangsan-ro	Sangju City	Sinheung-dong	
Cheonggu Town	청구타운앞	Prefectural Route 997 (Seokdan-ro)	Sangju City	Namwon-dong	
Nakyang IS	낙양사거리	Jungang-ro	Sangju City	Bukmun-dong	
Sangju Central Bus Terminal	상주종합버스터미널	Sambaek-ro	Sangju City	Bukmun-dong	
Bukcheongyo IS	북천교 교차로	National Route 25 (Yeongnamjeil-ro)	Sangju City	Bukmun-dong	National Route 25 overlap
Bukcheon Bridge	북천교		Sangju City	Bukmun-dong	National Route 25 overlap
Bukcheon Bridge IS (Sangju Bukcheon Battleground)	북천교북측삼거리 (상주 임란북천전적지)	Bukcheon-ro	Sangju City	Bukmun-dong	National Route 25 overlap
E-mart Sangju Store Sangju Tax Office	이마트 상주점 상주세무서		Sangju City	Bukmun-dong	National Route 25 overlap
Mansan IS	만산사거리	Mansan 7-gil	Sangju City	Bukmun-dong	National Route 25 overlap
Mansan IS	만산삼거리	Buksangju-ro	Sangju City	Bukmun-dong	National Route 25 overlap
Jukjeon IS	죽전 교차로	Buksangju-ro	Sangju City	Bukmun-dong	National Route 25 overlap
Chosan Overpass	초산육교	National Route 25 (Nakdong-daero)	Sangju City	Bukmun-dong	National Route 25 overlap
Buwon IS	부원 교차로	Buksangju-ro	Sangju City	Bukmun-dong	
Secheon Bridge	세천교		Sangju City	Bukmun-dong	
Secheon Bridge			Sangju City	Sabeol-myeon	
Wonheung IS	원흥 교차로	Buksangju-ro; Wonheung 4-gil	Sangju City	Sabeol-myeon	
Wonheung IS		Buksangju-ro; Wonheung 4-gil	Sangju City	Oeseo-myeon	
Baekwon IS	백원 교차로	Buksangju-ro	Sangju City	Oeseo-myeon	
Yeonbong IS	연봉 교차로	Buksangju-ro; Yeonbong 2-gil	Sangju City	Oeseo-myeon	
Gonggeom IS	공검 교차로	Buksangju-ro	Sangju City	Oeseo-myeon	
Dongcheon Bridge	동천교		Sangju City	Oeseo-myeon	
Hwadong Bridge	화동교		Sangju City	Gonggeom-myeon	
Hwadong IS	화동 교차로	Buksangju-ro	Sangju City	Gonggeom-myeon	
North Sangju IC	북상주 나들목	Jungbu Naeryuk Expressway	Sangju City	Gonggeom-myeon	
Ian IS	이안 교차로	Hamchang-ro	Sangju City	Ian-myeon	
Sinheung IS	신흥 교차로	Yonggok-ro	Sangju City	Hamchang-eup	
Ian Bridge	이안교		Sangju City	Hamchang-eup	
Taebong IS	태봉 교차로	Eopung-ro	Sangju City	Hamchang-eup	
Odong IS	오동 교차로	Gyeongsang-daero	Sangju City	Hamchang-eup	
Saimae IS	사이매 교차로	Hamchang-ro	Sangju City	Hamchang-eup	
Daejo IS	대조 교차로	Prefectural Route 32 (Danggyo-ro)	Sangju City	Hamchang-eup	
Jeomchon-Hamchang IC	점촌함창 나들목	Jungbu Naeryuk Expressway	Sangju City	Hamchang-eup	
Gongpyeong IS	공평 교차로	Jingok-gil	Mungyeong City	Jeomchon-dong	
Yugok IS	유곡 교차로	Yugokbuljeong-ro	Mungyeong City	Jeomchon-dong	
Buljeong 1 Bridge	불정1교		Mungyeong City	Jeomchon-dong	
Buljeong 1 Bridge			Mungyeong City	Hogye-myeon	
North of Buljeong 1 Bridge	불정1교 북단	National Route 34 (Sangmu-ro)	Mungyeong City	Hogye-myeon	National Route 34 overlap
Gyeontan IS	견탄사거리	Taebong 1-gil	Mungyeong City	Hogye-myeon	National Route 34 overlap
Buljeong 2 Bridge	불정2교		Mungyeong City	Hogye-myeon	National Route 34 overlap
Buljeong 2 Bridge			Mungyeong City	Jeomchon-dong	National Route 34 overlap
Buljeong 3 Bridge Jinnam 1 Bridge Jinnam 2 Bridge Jinnam 3 Bridge	불정3교 진남1교 진남2교 진남3교		Mungyeong City	Maseong-myeon	National Route 34 overlap
Sinhyeon IS	신현삼거리	Gurang-ro	Mungyeong City	Maseong-myeon	National Route 34 overlap
Soya Bridge	소야교		Mungyeong City	Maseong-myeon	National Route 34 overlap
Mogok IS	모곡 교차로	Prefectural Route 901 (Saejae-ro)	Mungyeong City	Maseong-myeon	National Route 34 overlap
Mungyeongsaejae IC (Namho IS)	문경새재 나들목 (남호 교차로)	Jungbu Naeryuk Expressway; Bongmyeong-gil	Mungyeong City	Maseong-myeon	National Route 34 overlap
Jinan Overpass	진안육교	Saejae-ro	Mungyeong City	Mungyeong-eup	National Route 34 overlap
Gakseo IS	각서 교차로	Ihwaryeong-ro	Mungyeong City	Mungyeong-eup	National Route 34 overlap
Ihwaryeong Tunnel	이화령터널		Mungyeong City	Mungyeong-eup	National Route 34 overlap Approximately 1600m Continuation into North Chungcheong Province

=== North Chungcheong Province ===
Name	Hangul name	Connection	Location		Note
Ihwaryeong Tunnel	이화령터널		Goesan County	Yeonpung-myeon	National Route 34 overlap Approximately 1600m North Gyeongsang Province - North Chungcheong Province border line
Yeonpung IC IS	연풍IC 교차로	National Route 34 (Jungbu-ro)	Goesan County	Yeonpung-myeon	National Route 34 overlap
Haengchon IS	행촌 교차로	Ihwaryeong-ro	Goesan County	Yeonpung-myeon	
Sinpung IS	신풍 교차로	Wonpung-ro Jeolgol-gil	Goesan County	Yeonpung-myeon	
Suok IS	수옥 교차로	Wonpung-ro	Goesan County	Yeonpung-myeon	
Suokjeong 2 Bridge	수옥정2교		Goesan County	Yeonpung-myeon	
Sojoryeong Tunnel	소조령터널		Goesan County	Yeonpung-myeon	Approximately 1234m
Sojoryeong Tunnel			Chungju City	Suanbo-myeon	Approximately 1234m
Eunhaengjeong IS	은행정 교차로	Saejae-ro; Eunhaengjeong-gil	Chungju City	Suanbo-myeon	
Woraksan IS	월악산 교차로	Suanbo-ro	Chungju City	Suanbo-myeon	Connected with Prefectural Route 597
Josan Bridge Tapdong Bridge	조산교 탑동교		Chungju City	Suanbo-myeon	
Suanbo IS	수안보 교차로	Suanbooncheon-gil	Chungju City	Suanbo-myeon	
Yangji Bridge	양지교		Chungju City	Suanbo-myeon	
Suanbocheon 1 Tunnel	수안보온천1터널		Chungju City	Suanbo-myeon	Approximately 335m
Eumji Bridge	음지교		Chungju City	Suanbo-myeon	
Suanbocheon 2 Tunnel	수안보온천2터널		Chungju City	Suanbo-myeon	Right tunnel: Approximately 321m Left tunnel: Approximately 310m
Jujeong Bridge	주정교		Chungju City	Suanbo-myeon	
North Suanbo (Osan Entrance)	수안보북측(오산진입)	Suanbo-ro	Chungju City	Suanbo-myeon	
Yangbong Bridge Wontong Bridge	양봉교 원통교		Chungju City	Suanbo-myeon	
Suhoe-ri IS	수회리 교차로	Prefectural Route 510 (Palbong-ro) (Suhoeri-ro)	Chungju City	Suanbo-myeon	
Yongcheon IS	용천삼거리	National Route 36; Prefectural Route 82 (Worak-ro)	Chungju City	Salmi-myeon	National Route 36 overlap Prefectural Route 82 overlap
Seseong IS	세성 교차로	National Route 19 (Goesan IC~Salmi Motorway); Prefectural Route 531 (Seseong-ro)	Chungju City	Salmi-myeon	National Route 19, National Route 36 overlap Prefectural Route 82 overlap
Salmi IS	살미삼거리	Seseong-ro	Chungju City	Salmi-myeon	National Route 19, National Route 36 overlap Prefectural Route 82 overlap
Munsan IS	문산삼거리	Mungang-ro	Chungju City	Salmi-myeon	National Route 19, National Route 36 overlap Prefectural Route 82 overlap
Hoeumsil IS	호음실삼거리	Hoeumsil 1-gil	Chungju City	Salmi-myeon	National Route 19, National Route 36 overlap Prefectural Route 82 overlap
Hyangsan IS	향산삼거리	Yujumang-ro	Chungju City	Salmi-myeon	National Route 19, National Route 36 overlap Prefectural Route 82 overlap
Norumok Bridge	노루목교		Chungju City	Salmi-myeon	National Route 19, National Route 36 overlap Prefectural Route 82 overlap
Norumok Bridge			Chungju City	Dalcheon-dong	National Route 19, National Route 36 overlap Prefectural Route 82 overlap
Pungdong IS	풍동 교차로	Prefectural Route 82 (Jungwon-daero)	Chungju City	Dalcheon-dong	National Route 19, National Route 36 overlap Prefectural Route 82 overlap
General Im Gyeong-eop IS	임경업장군 교차로	Sangpung 2-gil	Chungju City	Dalcheon-dong	National Route 19, National Route 36 overlap
Hapung IS	하풍 교차로	Pungdongdongmak-gil	Chungju City	Dalcheon-dong	National Route 19, National Route 36 overlap
Gaju IS	가주 교차로	Sogaju 1-gil	Chungju City	Dalcheon-dong	National Route 19, National Route 36 overlap
Yonggwan Tunnel	용관터널		Chungju City	Dalcheon-dong	National Route 19, National Route 36 overlap Right tunnel: Approximately 435m Left tunnel: Approximately 513m
Yongdu IS	용두 교차로	National Route 19 (Seobusunhwan-daero); Jungwon-daero	Chungju City	Dalcheon-dong	National Route 19, National Route 36 overlap
Yongdu IS	용두사거리	Prefectural Route 525 (Changhyeon-ro)	Chungju City	Dalcheon-dong	National Route 36 overlap Prefectural Route 525 overlap
Dalcheon Station	달천역	Sangyongdu 2-gil	Chungju City	Dalcheon-dong	National Route 36 overlap Prefectural Route 525 overlap
University of Transportation IS	교통대사거리	Korea National University of Transportation Chungju Campus; Gangdong College Chungju Campus	Chungju City	Daesowon-myeon	National Route 36 overlap Prefectural Route 525 overlap
Manjeok Bridge	만적교	Seongjongdudam-gil	Chungju City	Daesowon-myeon	National Route 36 overlap Prefectural Route 525 overlap
Chungju IC (Chungju IS)	충주 나들목 (충주 교차로)	Jungbu Naeryuk Expressway	Chungju City	Daesowon-myeon	National Route 36 overlap Prefectural Route 525 overlap
Taesowon Elementary School Cheomdan IS	대소원초등학교 첨단삼거리	Prefectural Route 599 (Cheomdansaneop-ro)	Chungju City	Daesowon-myeon	National Route 36 overlap Prefectural Route 525, 599 overlap
Daesowon IS	대소원사거리	Prefectural Route 599 (Soesil-ro)	Chungju City	Daesowon-myeon	National Route 36 overlap Prefectural Route 525, 599 overlap
Sinyang IS (Sinyang Overpass)	신양 교차로 (신양육교)	Sinyang-ro	Chungju City	Judeok-eup	National Route 36 overlap Prefectural Route 525 overlap
Judeok IS	주덕 교차로	National Route 36; Prefectural Route 525 (Chungcheong-daero)	Chungju City	Judeok-eup	National Route 36 overlap Prefectural Route 525 overlap
Sinjung IS	신중 교차로	Sindeok-ro	Chungju City	Judeok-eup	
Dopo 1 Bridge	도포1교		Chungju City	Sinni-myeon	
Yongwon IS	용원 교차로	Prefectural Route 49; Prefectural Route 82	Chungju City	Sinni-myeon	Prefectural Route 82 overlap
Songam IS	송암 교차로	Sindeok-ro	Chungju City	Sinni-myeon	Prefectural Route 82 overlap
West Chungju IC (Daehwa IS)	서충주 나들목 (대화 교차로)	Pyeongtaek-Jecheon Expressway; Prefectural Route 306 (Yonggwang-ro)	Chungju City	Sinni-myeon	Prefectural Route 82, 306 overlap
Osaeng 1 IS	오생1 교차로	Prefectural Route 82 (Daegeum-ro)	Chungju City	Sinni-myeon	Prefectural Route 82, 306 overlap
Osaeng 2 IS	오생2 교차로	Osin-ro	Eumseong County	Saenggeuk-myeon	Prefectural Route 306 overlap
Saengni IS	생리 교차로	Osin-ro	Eumseong County	Saenggeuk-myeon	Prefectural Route 306 overlap
Saenggeuk IS	생극 교차로	National Route 21; National Route 37; Prefectural Route 306 (Saengeum-daero)	Eumseong County	Saenggeuk-myeon	National Route 21, National Route 37 overlap Prefectural Route 306 overlap
Chapyeong IS	차평 교차로	Eumseong-ro	Eumseong County	Saenggeuk-myeon	National Route 21, National Route 37 overlap Continuation into Gyeonggi Province
Wondang IS	원당 교차로	Prefectural Route 525 (Wondang-gil)	Eumseong County	Gamgok-myeon	National Route 21, National Route 37 overlap Continuation into Gyeonggi Province
Cheongmicheon Bridge	청미천교		Eumseong County	Gamgok-myeon	National Route 21, National Route 37 overlap Continuation into Gyeonggi Province

=== Gyeonggi Province (South Seoul) ===
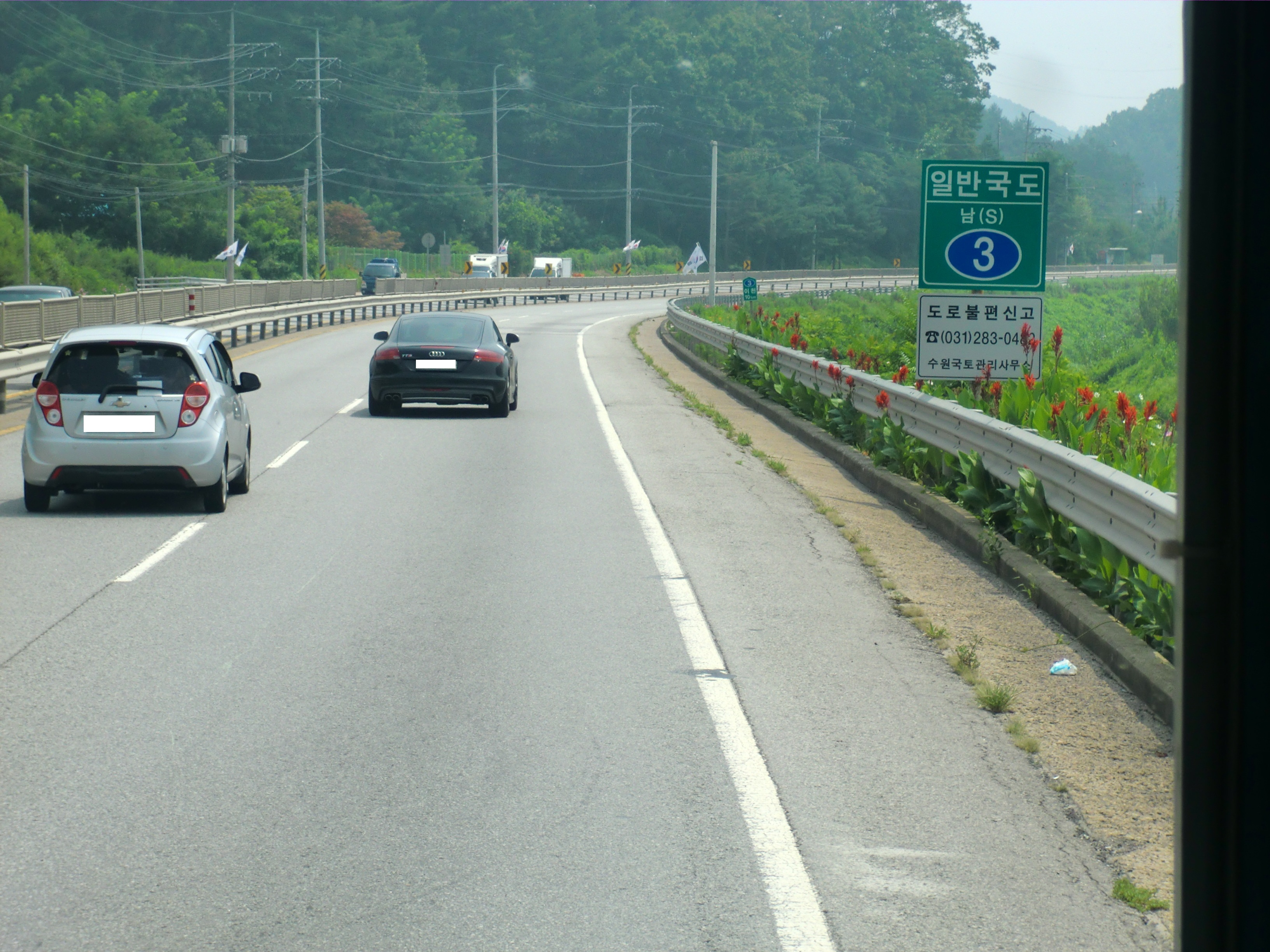
National Road 3 through Chowol-eup, Gwangju City.

Name	Hangul name	Connection	Location		Note
Cheongmicheon Bridge	청미천교		Icheon City	Janghowon-eup	National Route 21, National Route 37 overlap North Chungcheong Province - Gyeonggi Province border line
Jinam IC	진암 나들목	National Route 37; National Route 38 (Seodong-daero)	Icheon City	Janghowon-eup	National Route 21 terminus National Route 37 overlap
Jinam IS	진암삼거리	Gyeongchung-daero	Icheon City	Janghowon-eup	
Songsan IS	송산삼거리	Seoljang-ro	Icheon City	Janghowon-eup	
Wonha IS	원하삼거리	Gyeongchung-daero 307beon-gil Gyeongchung-daero 309beon-gil	Icheon City	Janghowon-eup	
Ihwang Elementary School IS Ihwang 1-ri IS	이황초교삼거리 이황1리삼거리		Icheon City	Janghowon-eup	
Sangseungdae IS	상승대삼거리	Gyeongchung-daero 597beon-gil	Icheon City	Janghowon-eup	
Ihwang Overpass IS	이황육교삼거리	Ipung-ro	Icheon City	Janghowon-eup	
Narae IS	나래삼거리	Gyeongchung-daero 782beon-gil	Icheon City	Janghowon-eup	
Mundeureonigogae	문드러니고개		Icheon City	Janghowon-eup	
Mundeureonigogae			Yeoju City	Ganam-eup	
Eunbong IS	은봉삼거리	Jaseok-ro	Yeoju City	Ganam-eup	
Fire Insurers Laboratories of Korea	방재시험연구원		Yeoju City	Ganam-eup	
Heukseok IS	흑석삼거리	Prefectural Route 84 (Heukseok-ro)	Yeoju City	Ganam-eup	
Segwang-ri Town Apartment	세광리치타운아파트		Yeoju City	Ganam-eup	
Geonjang IS	건장사거리	Yeojunam-ro	Yeoju City	Ganam-eup	
Taepyeong IS	태평사거리	Prefectural Route 333 (Seolga-ro) (Taepyeongjungang 1-gil)	Yeoju City	Ganam-eup	
Sinhae 1-ri IS	신해1리삼거리	Ilsin-ro	Yeoju City	Ganam-eup	
Dongnam Apartment Sinhae 2-ri IS	동남아파트 신해2리사거리		Yeoju City	Ganam-eup	
Jangpyeong IS Gyeonggi Expressway IS	장평삼거리 경기고속삼거리		Icheon City	Daewol-myeon	
Jangpyeong Bridge	장평교		Icheon City	Daewol-myeon	
Jangpyeong Bridge			Icheon City	Bubal-eup	
Eungam IS	응암삼거리	Gyeongchung-daero 1722beon-gil	Icheon City	Bubal-eup	
Eungam IC	응암 나들목	Former National Route 3 (Gyeongchung-daero)	Icheon City	Bubal-eup	
(Bridge) (Bridge) (Bridge)	(교량) (교량) (교량)		Icheon City	Bubal-eup	
Sujeong IC	수정 나들목	Hwangmu-ro 1833beon-gil	Icheon City	Bubal-eup	
(Bridge)	(교량)		Icheon City	Bubal-eup	
Bubal IC	부발 나들목	National Route 42 (Jungbu-daero)	Icheon City	Bubal-eup	
Sinwon 4 Bridge Gosacheon Bridge Sinwon 3 Bridge Sinwon 2 Bridge	신원4교 고사천교 신원3교 신원2교		Icheon City	Bubal-eup	
Sinwon 1 Bridge	신원1교		Icheon City	Bubal-eup	
Sinwon 1 Bridge			Icheon City	Baeksa-myeon	
Doji 3 Bridge	도지3교		Icheon City	Baeksa-myeon	
Doji 2 Bridge Doji IC	도지2교 도지 나들목	Cheongbaengni-ro 228beon-gil	Icheon City	Baeksa-myeon	
Doji 1 Bridge Mojeon Bridge	도지1교 모전교		Icheon City	Baeksa-myeon	
Baeksa IC	백사 나들목	Prefectural Route 70 (Iyeo-ro)	Icheon City	Baeksa-myeon	
Sindae 2 Bridge Sindae 1 Bridge	신대2교 신대1교		Icheon City	Baeksa-myeon	
Dobong 2 Bridge Dobong 1 Bridge	도봉2교 도봉1교		Icheon City	Sindun-myeon	
Doam IC	도암 나들목	Wonjeok-ro	Icheon City	Sindun-myeon	
Suha 2 Bridge Suha 1 Bridge Jiseok 3 Bridge Jiseok 2 Bridge Jiseok 1 Bridge	수하2교 수하1교 지석3교 지석2교 지석1교		Icheon City	Sindun-myeon	
Gyeonggae Tunnel	경개터널		Icheon City	Sindun-myeon	Approximately 1,950m
Gyeonggae Tunnel			Gwangju City	Gonjiam-eup	Approximately 1,950m
Bonghyeon 1 Bridge	봉현1교		Gwangju City	Gonjiam-eup	
Bonghyeon Tunnel	봉현터널		Gwangju City	Gonjiam-eup	Approximately 259m
Seolwol Bridge Bonghyeon IC	설월교 봉현 나들목	Sinman-ro	Gwangju City	Gonjiam-eup	
Silchon 2 Bridge Silchon 1 Bridge	실촌2교 실촌1교		Gwangju City	Gonjiam-eup	
Yeolmi IC	열미 나들목	Prefectural Route 98 (Gwangyeo-ro)	Gwangju City	Gonjiam-eup	
Gwangju 4 Tunnel	광주4터널		Gwangju City	Gonjiam-eup	
Yeolmi 1 Bridge	열미1교		Gwangju City	Gonjiam-eup	
Gwangju 3 Tunnel	광주3터널		Gwangju City	Gonjiam-eup	
Gwangju 3 Tunnel			Gwangju City	Chowol-eup	
Gwangju 2 Tunnel	광주2터널		Gwangju City	Chowol-eup	
Chowol IC	초월 나들목	Gwangju-Wonju Expressway	Gwangju City	Chowol-eup	
Neukhyeon Bridge	늑현교		Gwangju City	Chowol-eup	
Gwangju 1 Tunnel	광주1터널		Gwangju City	Chowol-eup	
(Bridge) (Bridge)	(교량) (교량)		Gwangju City	Chowol-eup	
Ssangdong JCT	쌍동 분기점	Former National Route 3 (Gyeongchung-daero)	Gwangju City	Chowol-eup	
Daessang Bridge	대쌍교		Gwangju City	Chowol-eup	
Baengma Tunnel	백마터널		Gwangju City	Chowol-eup	Right tunnel: Approximately 2,405m Left tunnel: Approximately 2,385m
Baengma Tunnel			Gwangju City	Opo-eup	Right tunnel: Approximately 2,405m Left tunnel: Approximately 2,385m
Gyeongan Bridge	경안대교		Gwangju City	Opo-eup	
Gyeongan Bridge			Gwangju City	Gwangnam-dong	
Taejeon JCT	태전 분기점	National Route 43; National Route 45 (Hoean-daero)	Gwangju City	Gwangnam-dong	
Taejeon Rest Area	태전 졸음쉼터		Gwangju City	Gwangnam-dong	
(Tunnel)	(터널)		Gwangju City	Gwangnam-dong	
Jungdae Rest Area	중대 졸음쉼터		Gwangju City	Gwangnam-dong	
(Saengtae Tunnel)	(생태터널)		Gwangju City	Gwangnam-dong	Approximately 50m
Jikdong IC	직동 나들목	Gobul-ro	Gwangju City	Gwangnam-dong	
Jingni Tunnel	직리터널		Gwangju City	Gwangnam-dong	Approximately 310m
Jungwon Tunnel	중원터널		Gwangju City	Gwangnam-dong	Approximately 1,195m
Jungwon Tunnel			Seongnam City	Jungwon District	Approximately 1,195m
Seommal IC	섬말 나들목	Huimang-ro	Seongnam City	Jungwon District	
Daewon IC Seommal Bridge	대원 나들목 섬말교	Former National Route 3 (Gyeongchung-daero)	Seongnam City	Jungwon District	
Seongnam Bridge	성남교		Seongnam City	Jungwon District	
Jungwon Bridge	중원교	Jeil-ro	Seongnam City	Jungwon District	
Seongnam IC (Yeosu IS)	성남 나들목 (여수사거리)	Seoul Ring Expressway; Seongnam-daero	Seongnam City	Jungwon District	
Moran Market IS	모란시장사거리	Dunchon-daero	Seongnam City	Jungwon District	
Moran station	모란역		Seongnam City	Jungwon District	
Moran IS	모란삼거리	Gwangmyeong-ro	Seongnam City	Jungwon District	
Moran IS	모란사거리	Sanseong-daero	Seongnam City	Jungwon District	
Sujin 2-dong Community Center	수진2동주민센터		Seongnam City	Sujeong District	
Taepyeong Station IS (Taepyeong station)	태평역사거리 (태평역)	Sujeong-ro	Seongnam City	Sujeong District	
Seongnam Sujeong Police Station	성남수정경찰서		Seongnam City	Sujeong District	
Gachon University Station IS (Gachon University station)	가천대역삼거리 (가천대역)	Taepyeong-ro	Seongnam City	Sujeong District	
Gachon University Global Campus	가천대학교 글로벌캠퍼스		Seongnam City	Sujeong District	
Dong Seoul College	동서울대학교	Bokjeong-ro; Tancheon-ro	Seongnam City	Sujeong District	
Bokjeong Bridge	복정교		Seongnam City	Sujeong District	Continuation into Seoul

=== Seoul ===
Name	Hangul name	Connection	Location		Note
Bokjeong Bridge	복정교		Seoul	Songpa District	Gyeonggi Province - Seoul border line
Bokjeong Station IS (Bokjeong station)	복정역 교차로 (복정역)	Seoul City Route 41; Prefectural Route 342 (Heolleung-ro)	Seoul	Songpa District	Seoul City Route 71 overlap
Songpa IC	송파 나들목	Seoul Ring Expressway	Seoul	Songpa District	Seoul City Route 71 overlap
Jangji Bridge IS	장지교 교차로	Tancheondong-ro; Songpa-daero 4-gil	Seoul	Songpa District	Seoul City Route 71 overlap
Jangji Bridge	장지교		Seoul	Songpa District	Seoul City Route 71 overlap
Jangji station (Garden 5)	장지역 (가든파이브)	Chungmin-ro	Seoul	Songpa District	Seoul City Route 71 overlap
Munjeong Station IS (Munjeong station)	문정역 교차로 (문정역)	Munjeong-ro	Seoul	Songpa District	Seoul City Route 71 overlap
Olympic Family Town	올림픽훼밀리타운	Dongnam-ro	Seoul	Songpa District	Seoul City Route 71 overlap
Garak Market Station IS (Garak Market station) (Central Radio Management Service)	가락시장역 교차로 (가락시장역) (중앙전파관리소)	Jungdae-ro	Seoul	Songpa District	Seoul City Route 71 overlap
Garak Market IS (Songpa Underpass)	가락시장 교차로 (송파지하차도)	Seoul City Route 92 (Yangjae-daero)	Seoul	Songpa District	Seoul City Route 71 overlap
Songpa station	송파역		Seoul	Songpa District	Seoul City Route 71 overlap
Songpa IS	송파사거리	Garak-ro	Seoul	Songpa District	Seoul City Route 71 overlap
Seokchon Station IS (Seokchon station)	석촌역 교차로 (석촌역)	Baekjegobun-ro	Seoul	Songpa District	Seoul City Route 71 overlap
Seokchon Lake IS	석촌호수 교차로	Seokchonhosu-ro	Seoul	Songpa District	Seoul City Route 71 overlap
Jamsil Station IS (Jamsil station)	잠실역 교차로 (잠실역)	Seoul City Route 90 (Olympic-ro)	Seoul	Songpa District	Seoul City Route 71 overlap
South of Jamsil Bridge	잠실대교 남단	Olympic-ro 35-gil	Seoul	Songpa District	Seoul City Route 71 overlap
Jamsil Bridge JCT	잠실대교 분기점	Olympic-daero	Seoul	Songpa District	Seoul City Route 71 overlap
Jamsil Bridge	잠실대교		Seoul	Songpa District	Seoul City Route 71 overlap
Jamsil Bridge			Seoul	Gwangjin District	Seoul City Route 71 overlap
Jamsil Bridge IC	잠실대교 북단 나들목	National Route 46; Seoul City Route 70 (Gangbyeonbuk-ro)	Seoul	Gwangjin District	Seoul City Route 71 overlap
Jamsil Bridge IS	잠실대교북단 교차로	Ttukseom-ro	Seoul	Gwangjin District	Seoul City Route 71 overlap
Dong Seoul Mail Center	동서울우편집중국		Seoul	Gwangjin District	Seoul City Route 71 overlap
Jayang IS	자양사거리	Achasan-ro	Seoul	Gwangjin District	Seoul City Route 71 overlap
Gwangjin District Office Konkuk University High School Seoul Gwangjin Police Station	광진구청 건국대학교사범대학 부속중학교 서울광진경찰서		Seoul	Gwangjin District	Seoul City Route 71 overlap
Guui IS	구의사거리	Seoul City Route 60 (Gwangnaru-ro)	Seoul	Gwangjin District	Seoul City Route 71 overlap
Achasan Station IS	아차산역 교차로	Seoul City Route 50 (Cheonho-daero)	Seoul	Gwangjin District	Seoul City Route 50, Seoul City Route 71 overlap
Achasan station	아차산역		Seoul	Gwangjin District	Seoul City Route 50, Seoul City Route 71 overlap
Achasan Station IS	아차산역 교차로	Yongmasan-ro	Seoul	Gwangjin District	
Gunja Station IS (Gunja station)	군자역 교차로 (군자역)	Neungdong-ro	Seoul	Gwangjin District	
Gunja Bridge IS	군자교 교차로	National Route 47 (Dongil-ro)	Seoul	Gwangjin District	National Route 47 overlap
Donggok IS	동곡삼거리	Gingorang-ro	Seoul	Gwangjin District	National Route 47 overlap
Changpyeong Bridge IS	장평교 교차로	Dapsimni-ro	Seoul	Gwangjin District	National Route 47 overlap
Changpyeong Bridge IS		Dapsimni-ro	Seoul	Jungnang District	National Route 47 overlap
Myeonmok Bridge IS	면목교 교차로	Myeonmokcheon-ro	Seoul	Jungnang District	National Route 47 overlap
Jangan Bridge IS	장안교사거리	Sagajeong-ro	Seoul	Jungnang District	National Route 47 overlap
Myeongok 5-dong Community Center	면목5동주민센터		Seoul	Jungnang District	National Route 47 overlap
Myeongok 2-dong IS	면목2동사거리	Gyeomjae-ro	Seoul	Jungnang District	National Route 47 overlap
Seoul Joongmok Elementary School	서울중목초등학교		Seoul	Jungnang District	National Route 47 overlap
Jungnang Telephone Office IS	중랑전화국 교차로	Bongujae-ro	Seoul	Jungnang District	National Route 47 overlap
Dongil-ro Underpass IS	동일로지하차도 교차로	National Route 6 National Route 47 (Mangu-ro)	Seoul	Jungnang District	National Route 47 overlap
Jangan Middle School	장안중학교		Seoul	Jungnang District	
Junghwa Station IS (Junghwa station)	중화역 교차로 (중화역)	Bonghwasan-ro	Seoul	Jungnang District	
Meokgol Station IS (Meokgol station)	먹골역 교차로 (먹골역)	Gongneung-ro	Seoul	Jungnang District	
Mokdong Bridge	목동교		Seoul	Jungnang District	
Mokdong Bridge			Seoul	Nowon District	
Taereung Station IS (Taereung station)	태릉입구역 교차로 (태릉입구역)	Hwarang-ro	Seoul	Nowon District	
Gongneung Station IS (Gongneung station)	공릉역 교차로 (공릉역)	Dongil-ro 191-gil Dongil-ro 192-gil	Seoul	Nowon District	
Seoul National University of Science and Technology Entrance	서울과기대입구	Dongil-ro 197-gil Dongil-ro 198-gil	Seoul	Nowon District	
Hagye Underpass	하계지하차도		Seoul	Nowon District	
Hagye Station IS (Hagye station)	하계역 교차로 (하계역)	Hangeulbiseong-ro	Seoul	Nowon District	
Nowon-gu Community Center	노원구민회관	Dongil-ro 203-gil Dongil-ro 204-gil	Seoul	Nowon District	
Jungye Neighbourhood Park Wisteria Tree Neighbourhood Park	중계근린공원 등나무근린공원		Seoul	Nowon District	
Jungye Neighbourhood Park IS	중계근린공원 교차로	Dongil-ro 205-gil Dongil-ro 206-gil	Seoul	Nowon District	
Junggye Station IS (Junggye station)	중계역 교차로 (중계역)	Deongneung-ro	Seoul	Nowon District	
Danghyeon 1 Bridge	당현1교		Seoul	Nowon District	
Sanggye Paik Hospital IS (Inje University Sanggye Paik Hospital)	상계백병원 교차로 (인제대학교 상계백병원)	Dongil-ro 213-gil Dongil-ro 214-gil	Seoul	Nowon District	
Sanggye 2, 6 Complex IS	상계2, 6단지 교차로	Dongil-ro 215-gil Dongil-ro 216-gil	Seoul	Nowon District	
Nowon Station IS (Nowon station)	노원역 교차로 (노원역)	Nohae-ro; Sanggye-ro	Seoul	Nowon District	
Road Traffic Authority Dobong DMV Yonghwa Girls' High School	도봉운전면허시험장 용화여자고등학교		Seoul	Nowon District	
Onsugol IS	온수골사거리	Nowon-ro	Seoul	Nowon District	
Madeul Station IS (Madeul station)	마들역 교차로 (마들역)	Hangeulbiseong-ro	Seoul	Nowon District	
Sanggye 11-13 Complex	상계11-13단지	Dongil-ro 227-gil Dongil-ro 228-gil	Seoul	Nowon District	
Sangye 14-16 Complex	상계14-16단지	Suraksan-ro	Seoul	Nowon District	
Seoul Noil Elementary School	서울노일초등학교		Seoul	Nowon District	
Suraksan Station IS (Suraksan station)	수락산역 교차로 (수락산역)	Dongil-ro	Seoul	Nowon District	
Korea City Airport Terminal Surak Terminal	한국도심공항 수락터미널		Seoul	Nowon District	
Nowon Bridge	노원교		Seoul	Nowon District	
Nowon Bridge			Seoul	Dobong District	
Nowon Bridge IS	노원교 교차로	Madeul-ro	Seoul	Dobong District	
Dobong station IS	도봉역사거리	Dobong-ro	Seoul	Dobong District	
Dobongsan Station IS	도봉산역 교차로	Dobongsan-gil	Seoul	Dobong District	
Dobongsan station	도봉산역		Seoul	Dobong District	Continuation into Gyeonggi Province

=== Gyeonggi Province (North Seoul) ===
Name	Hangul name	Connection	Location		Note
Darak Bridge	다락교		Uijeongbu City	Howon-dong	
Howon Overpass	호원고가교	Seobu-ro	Uijeongbu City	Howon-dong	
Lotte Apartment	롯데아파트앞	Seogye-ro	Uijeongbu City	Howon-dong	
Mangwolsa Station IS	망월사역 교차로	Mangwol-ro	Uijeongbu City	Howon-dong	
Mangwolsa station	망월사역		Uijeongbu City	Howon-dong	
No name	(이름 없음)	Anmal-ro	Uijeongbu City	Howon-dong	
Hoeryong station	회룡역		Uijeongbu City	Howon-dong	
Hoeryong Station IS	회룡역앞 교차로	Hoeryong-ro	Uijeongbu City	Howon-dong	
Uijeongbu Bridge IS	의정부교앞 교차로	Baekseok-ro	Uijeongbu City	Howon-dong	
Uijeongbu Bridge	의정부교		Uijeongbu City	Howon-dong	
Uijeongbu Bridge			Uijeongbu City	Uijeongbu-dong	
Gyeongui IS	경의 교차로	Gyeongui-ro; Taepyeong-ro	Uijeongbu City	Uijeongbu-dong	
East Uijeongbu Station IS (Uijeongbu station)	의정부역동부 교차로 (의정부역)	Simin-ro; Haengbok-ro	Uijeongbu City	Uijeongbu-dong	
Heungseon Underpass IS	흥선지하차도 교차로	Heungseon-ro	Uijeongbu City	Uijeongbu-dong	
Jungang IS	중앙 교차로	Hoguk-ro	Uijeongbu City	Uijeongbu-dong	
Uijeongbu Veterans Affairs Office	의정부보훈지청		Uijeongbu City	Uijeongbu-dong	
Munhwa IS	문화 교차로	Ganeung-ro	Uijeongbu City	Uijeongbu-dong	
Ganeung station	가능역		Uijeongbu City	Uijeongbu-dong	
Gajaeul IS	가재울 교차로	Sinchon-ro; Taepyeong-ro	Uijeongbu City	Uijeongbu-dong	
Ganeung IS	가능 교차로	Gageum-ro	Uijeongbu City	Ganeung-dong	
Nogyang IS	녹양사거리	National Route 39 (Seobu-ro)	Uijeongbu City	Nogyang-dong	
Nogyang station	녹양역		Uijeongbu City	Nogyang-dong	
Biseok IS	비석사거리	Majeon-ro; Sanseong-ro	Uijeongbu City	Nogyang-dong	
Biseok IS		Majeon-ro; Sanseong-ro	Yangju City	Yangju-dong	
Yangju Station IS	양주역삼거리	Oemi-ro 64beon-gil	Yangju City	Yangju-dong	
Yangju station	양주역		Yangju City	Yangju-dong	
Oemi IS	외미 교차로	Prefectural Route 360 (Buheung-ro)	Yangju City	Yangju-dong	
Yangju City Hall IS	양주시청사거리	Prefectural Route 98; Prefectural Route 360 (Buheung-ro)	Yangju City	Yangju-dong	
Saemnaegogae	샘내고개		Yangju City	Yangju-dong	
Saemnaegogae			Yangju City	Hoecheon-dong	
Deokgye IS	덕계삼거리	Godeok-ro	Yangju City	Hoecheon-dong	
Yangju Deoksan Elementary School	양주덕산초등학교		Yangju City	Hoecheon-dong	
Deokgye Park	덕계공원		Yangju City	Hoecheon-dong	
Deokgye Park IS	덕계공원사거리	Godeok-ro 139beon-gil Pyeonghwa-ro 1475beon-gil	Yangju City	Hoecheon-dong	
Lotte Mart Yangju Store Hoijung Elementary School	롯데마트 양주점 회정초등학교		Yangju City	Hoecheon-dong	
Hoejeong IS	회정삼거리	Hoejeong-ro	Yangju City	Hoecheon-dong	
Yangju Police Station E-mart Yangju Store	양주경찰서 이마트 양주점		Yangju City	Hoecheon-dong	
Deokjeong IS	덕정사거리	Prefectural Route 55 (Hwahap-ro)	Yangju City	Hoecheon-dong	
Bongyang IS	봉양 교차로	Sinpyeonghwa-ro	Yangju City	Hoecheon-dong	
Bongyang IS	봉양사거리	Yongam-ro; Chilbongsan-ro	Yangju City	Hoecheon-dong	
Songnae IS	송내삼거리	Gangbyeon-ro	Dongducheon City	Songnae-dong	
No name	(이름 없음)	Songnae-ro	Dongducheon City	Songnae-dong	
Dongduchon Jungang High School	동두천중앙고등학교		Dongducheon City	Bulhyeon-dong	
Jihaeng station	지행역	Jihaeng-ro	Dongducheon City	Bulhyeon-dong	
Daewon Villa IS	대원빌라사거리	Janggogaet-ro	Dongducheon City	Bulhyeon-dong	
Saenggol IS	생골사거리	Prefectural Route 364; Prefectural Route 379 (Samnyuksa-ro)	Dongducheon City	Bulhyeon-dong	
Yurim IS	유림사거리	Saenggol-ro; Keunsijang-ro	Dongducheon City	Bulhyeon-dong	
Dongducheonjungang station	동두천중앙역		Dongducheon City	Bulhyeon-dong	
Jeongjang IS	정장사거리	Jeongjang-ro	Dongducheon City	Saengyeon-dong	
Dongyeon IS	동연사거리	Donggwang-ro	Dongducheon City	Saengyeon-dong	
Bosan IS	보산사거리	Jungang-ro	Dongducheon City	Saengyeon-dong	
Bosan station	보산역		Dongducheon City	Bosan-dong	
Bosan Square IS	보산광장삼거리	Janggogaet-ro	Dongducheon City	Bosan-dong	
No name	(이름 없음)	Sangpae-ro	Dongducheon City	Bosan-dong	
2nd Dongducheon Bridge	동두천제2교		Dongducheon City	Bosan-dong	
2nd Dongducheon Bridge			Dongducheon City	Soyo-dong	
Dongducheon station Soyo-dong Community Center	동두천역 소요동주민센터		Dongducheon City	Soyo-dong	
Soyosan IS	소요산사거리	Bongdong-ro; Pyeonghwa-ro 2910beon-gil	Dongducheon City	Soyo-dong	
Soyosan station	소요산역		Dongducheon City	Soyo-dong	
Malttukgogae IS	말뚝고개삼거리	Cheongsin-ro	Dongducheon City	Soyo-dong	
Choseong Bridge	초성교		Yeoncheon County	Cheongsan-myeon	
Choseong IS	초성 교차로	Prefectural Route 368 (Cheongsin-ro)	Yeoncheon County	Cheongsan-myeon	
Choseong IS	초성삼거리	Cheongsin-ro	Yeoncheon County	Cheongsan-myeon	
Hakdam IS	학담삼거리	Hakdam-ro 89beon-gil	Yeoncheon County	Cheongsan-myeon	
Daejeon Is	대전삼거리	Prefectural Route 372 (Cheongchang-ro)	Yeoncheon County	Cheongsan-myeon	Prefectural Route 372 overlap
Hantan Bridge IS	한탄대교사거리	Goneung-ro	Yeoncheon County	Cheongsan-myeon	Prefectural Route 372 overlap
Hantan Bridge	한탄대교		Yeoncheon County	Cheongsan-myeon	Prefectural Route 372 overlap
Hantan Bridge			Yeoncheon County	Jeongok-eup	Prefectural Route 372 overlap
Sarang-dong IS	사랑동삼거리		Yeoncheon County	Jeongok-eup	Prefectural Route 372 overlap
Jeongok Entrance IS	전곡입구오거리	Jeongong-ro; Hanyeoul-ro; Jeongong-ro 6beon-gil	Yeoncheon County	Jeongok-eup	Prefectural Route 372 overlap
Paik Hospital IS	백병원앞 교차로	Bamgol-ro	Yeoncheon County	Jeongok-eup	Prefectural Route 372 overlap
No name	(이름 없음)	National Route 37 (Yangyeon-ro)	Yeoncheon County	Jeongok-eup	National Route 37 overlap Prefectural Route 372 overlap
Guseokgi IS	구석기사거리	Jeongokyeok-ro	Yeoncheon County	Jeongok-eup	National Route 37 overlap Prefectural Route 372 overlap
Yeongdo IS	영도사거리	Jeongong-ro 161beon-gil Pyeonghwa-ro 629beon-gil	Yeoncheon County	Jeongok-eup	National Route 37 overlap Prefectural Route 372 overlap
Jeongok Bridge	전곡교	National Route 37 (Jeonyeong-ro); Prefectural Route 372 (Cheongjeong-ro)	Yeoncheon County	Jeongok-eup	National Route 37 overlap Prefectural Route 372 overlap
Taepung Apartment Entrance	태풍아파트입구		Yeoncheon County	Jeongok-eup	
Eundae IS	은대삼거리	Eundae-ro	Yeoncheon County	Jeongok-eup	
Eundae Overpass Baraema-eul Entrance Yeoncheon Fire Station Eosumul Entrance	은대육교 바래마을입구 연천소방서 어수물입구		Yeoncheon County	Jeongok-eup	
Gopo-ri Entrance	고포리입구	Tonghyeon-gil	Yeoncheon County	Yeoncheon-eup	
Tonghyeon IS	통현삼거리	Prefectural Route 78 (Hyeonmun-ro)	Yeoncheon County	Yeoncheon-eup	Prefectural Route 78 overlap
Yeoncheon Entrance IS	연천진입삼거리	Yeoncheon-ro	Yeoncheon County	Yeoncheon-eup	Prefectural Route 78 overlap
Dongmak IS	동막사거리	Dongnae-ro; Yeoncheon-ro 42beon-gil	Yeoncheon County	Yeoncheon-eup	Prefectural Route 78 overlap
Yeoncheon Bridge	연천대교		Yeoncheon County	Yeoncheon-eup	Prefectural Route 78 overlap
Yeoncheon IS	연천 교차로	Under construction	Yeoncheon County	Yeoncheon-eup	Prefectural Route 78 overlap
Joheung Apartment IS	조흥아파트삼거리	Yeoncheonyeok-ro	Yeoncheon County	Yeoncheon-eup	Prefectural Route 78 overlap
Civic Stadium IS	공설운동장삼거리	Munhwa-ro	Yeoncheon County	Yeoncheon-eup	Prefectural Route 78 overlap
Hyeonga IS	현가삼거리	Yeoncheon-ro	Yeoncheon County	Yeoncheon-eup	Prefectural Route 78 overlap
Sangri IS	상리삼거리	Prefectural Route 78 (Gunnam-ro)	Yeoncheon County	Yeoncheon-eup	Prefectural Route 78 overlap
Sinmang-ri station	신망리역		Yeoncheon County	Yeoncheon-eup	
Sangri IS	상리사거리	Sinmang-ro	Yeoncheon County	Yeoncheon-eup	
Wacho IS	와초사거리	Hamnae-ro	Yeoncheon County	Yeoncheon-eup	
Daegwang Bridge	대광교		Yeoncheon County	Yeoncheon-eup	
Daegwang Bridge			Yeoncheon County	Sinseo-myeon	
Naesan-ri Entrance IS	내산리입구 교차로	Prefectural Route 376 (Donae-ro)	Yeoncheon County	Sinseo-myeon	Prefectural Route 376 overlap
Dosin 3-ri IS	도신3리삼거리	Janggeori-gil	Yeoncheon County	Sinseo-myeon	Prefectural Route 376 overlap
Dosin Overpass	도신육교		Yeoncheon County	Sinseo-myeon	Prefectural Route 376 overlap
Bangadari IS	방아다리삼거리	Prefectural Route 376 (Dosin-ro)	Yeoncheon County	Sinseo-myeon	Prefectural Route 376 overlap
Daegwang Elementary School Daegwang-ri station Gyeonggi-do Student Yeoncheon Camp	대광초등학교 대광리역 경기도학생연천야영장		Yeoncheon County	Sinseo-myeon	
Sintan-ri station	신탄리역	Godaesan-gil	Yeoncheon County	Sinseo-myeon	
Sintan Bridge	신탄교		Yeoncheon County	Sinseo-myeon	Continuation into Gangwon Province

=== Gangwon Province ===
Name	Hangul name	Connection	Location		Note
Daema-ri	대마리		Cheorwon County	Cheorwon-eup	Gyeonggi Province - Gangwon Province border line
Baengmagoji station	백마고지역		Cheorwon County	Cheorwon-eup	
Daema IS	대마사거리	National Route 87; Prefectural Route 463 (Myojang-ro)	Cheorwon County	Cheorwon-eup	
Sayo-ri Oechon-ri Naepo-ri	사요리 외촌리 내포리		Cheorwon County	Cheorwon-eup	Civilian Control Zone (CCZ)
Woljeong-ri station	월정리역	Durumi-ro	Cheorwon County	Cheorwon-eup	Civilian Control Zone (CCZ)
Continuation into North Korea
