= Hwarangdae station =

Metro station in South Korea

화랑대 (서울여대입구); Hwarangdae (Seoul Women's Univ.)
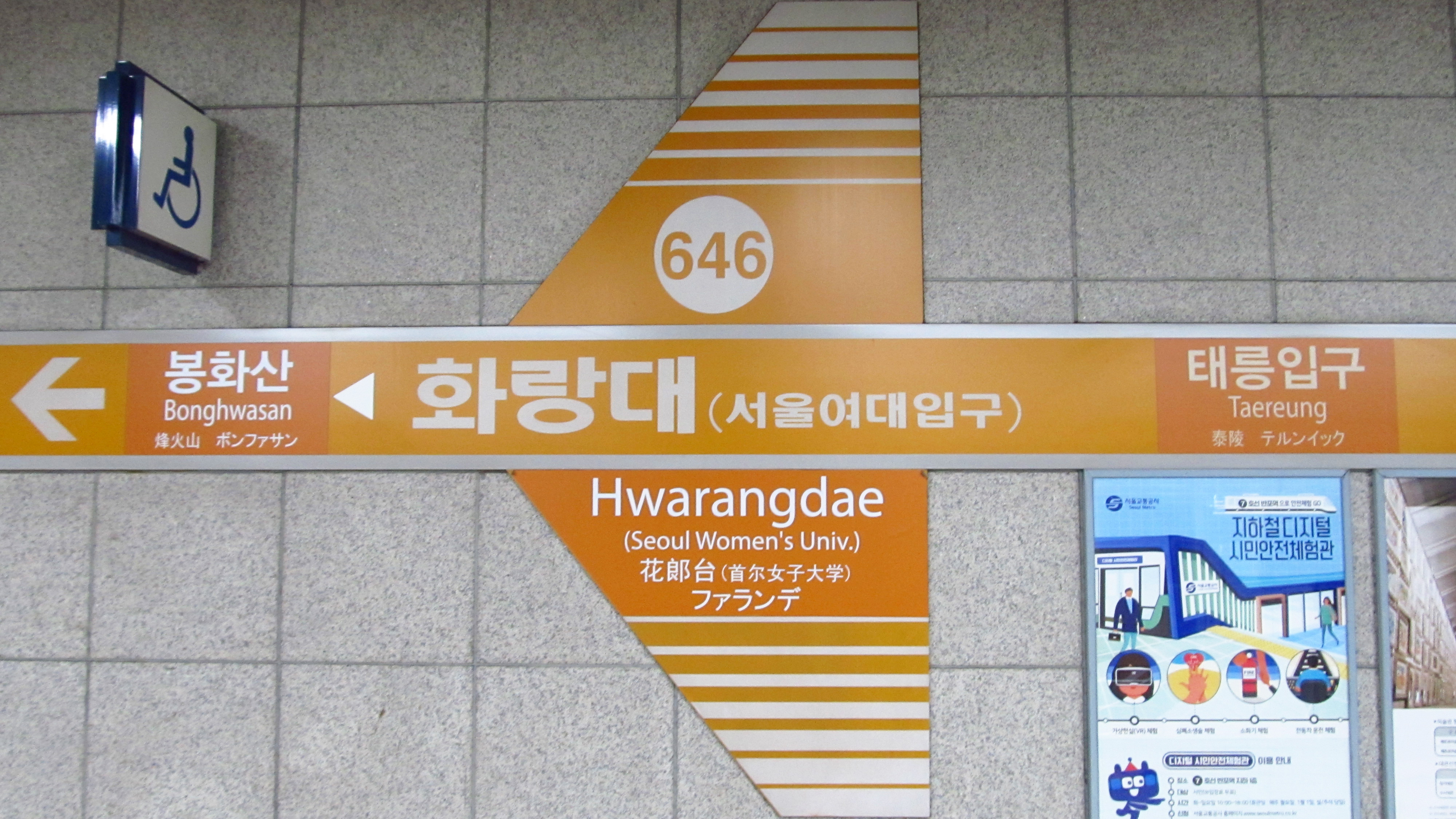
- Station nameplate

Korean name
- Hangul: 화랑대역
- Hanja: 花郞臺驛
- Revised Romanization: Hwarangdae-yeok
- McCune–Reischauer: Hwarangdae-yŏk

General information
- Location: 284-5 Gongneung 2-dong, Nowon-gu, Seoul
- Coordinates: 37°37′12″N 127°05′05″E
- Operated by: Seoul Metro
- Line(s): Line 6
- Platforms: 2
- Tracks: 2

Construction
- Structure type: Underground

Key dates
- August 7, 2000: Line 6 opened

Hwarangdae Station is an underground Metro Seoul station in Seoul, South Korea, served by the line 6. The station is located in Gongneung-2(Yi) dong located near Korea Military Academy, where its name comes from, Seoul Women's University and Sahmyook University, and it opened in 2000.

== Station layout ==
G	Street level	Exit

L1; Concourse	Lobby	Customer Service, Shops, Vending machines, ATMs

L2; Platform level	Side platform, doors will open on the right
L2; Platform level	Westbound	← Line 6 toward Eungam (Taereung)
L2; Platform level	Eastbound	Line 6 toward Sinnae (Bonghwasan) →
L2; Platform level	Side platform, doors will open on the right

== Exits ==
- Exit 1: Taeneung Intersection, Sahmyook University, Gongneung Police Office, Gongneung Fire Hall
- Exit 2: Gongneung 2-dong, Gongneung 2-dong Office
- Exit 3: Taeneung Elementary School, Gongneung Middle School, Seoul Women's University
- Exit 4: Korea Military Academy, Taeneung Training Center, Eastern Castle
- Exit 5: Gongneung-dong Public Park
- Exit 6: Jungnang Public Library, Jungnang Sports Center
- Exit 7: Muk 1-dong, Wonmuk Elementary School, Wonmuk Middle School, Taeneung High School

== See also ==
- Korea Military Academy
- Sahmyook University
- Seoul Women's University
- Subways in South Korea
- Seoul Metropolitan Rapid Transit Corporation
- Seoul Metropolitan Subway

Preceding station	Seoul Metropolitan Subway	Following station
Taereung towards Eungam	Line 6	Bonghwasan towards Sinnae
