= Gongneung station =

Metro station in Nowon-gu, Seoul, South Korea

Coordinates: 37°37′31.9″N 127°4′22.7″E

공릉 (서울과학기술대); Gongneung (Seoul National Univ. of Science and Technology)
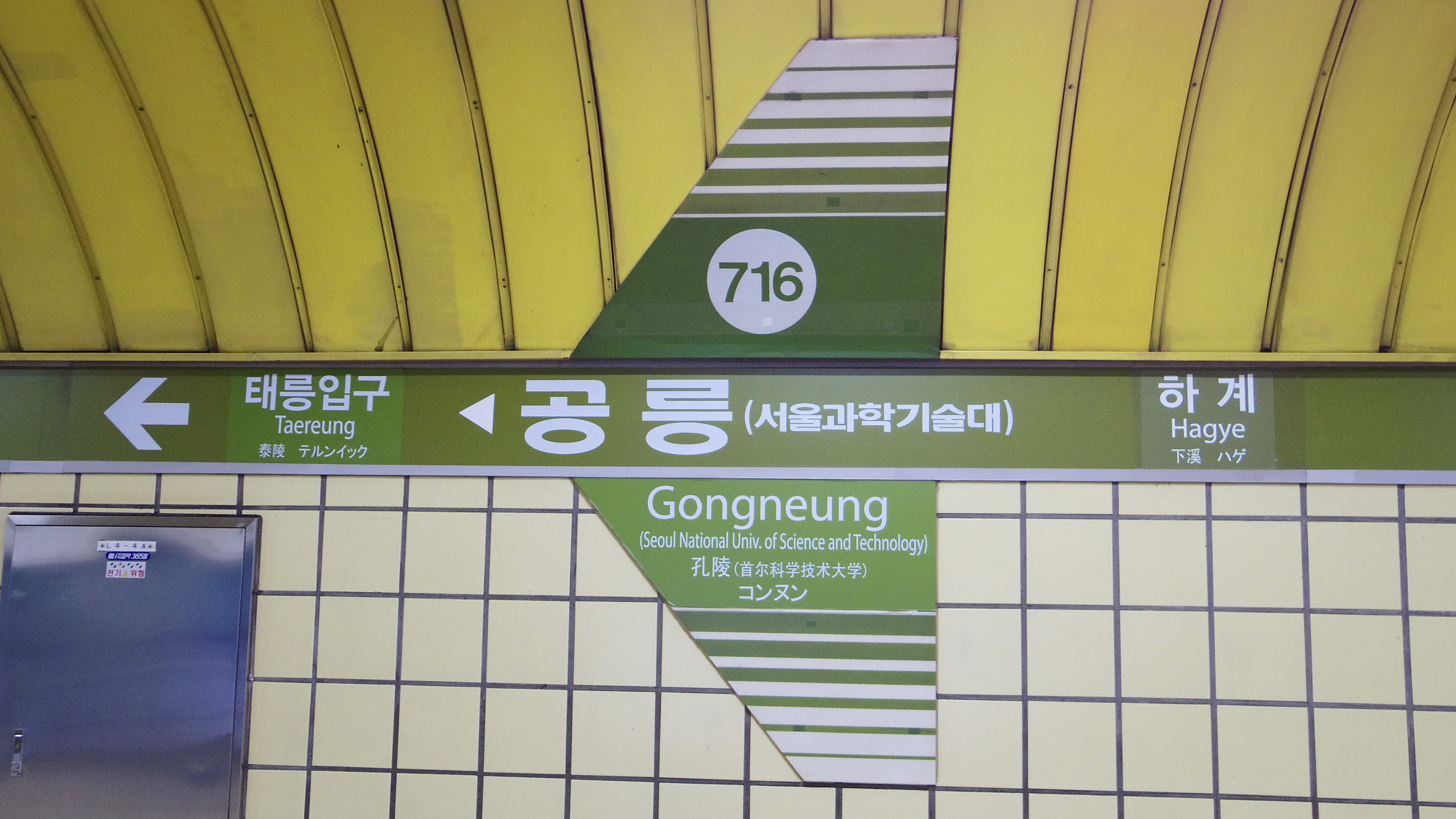
- Station Sign

Korean name
- Hangul: 공릉역
- Hanja: 孔陵驛
- Revised Romanization: Gongneung-yeok
- McCune–Reischauer: Kongnŭng-yŏk

General information
- Location: 395 Gongneung-dong, Nowon-gu, Seoul
- Operator: Seoul Metro
- Line: Line 7
- Platforms: 2
- Tracks: 2

Construction
- Structure type: Underground

Key dates
- October 11, 1996: Line 7 opened
Location

Gongneung Station (Korean: 공릉역) is a station on the Seoul Subway Line 7, having the subname "Seoul National University of Science and Technology".

There are four exits, one at each corner of the crossroads just above the station. No escalators are built on any of the exits yet, but a lift for disabled people is installed near the exit #2. Seoul National University of Science and Technology is located within a distance of 10 minute walk from the station.

== Station layout ==
Hagye ↑
S/B | | N/B
↓ Taereung

Southbound	← ● Line 7 toward Seongnam
Northbound	● Line 7 toward Jangam →

Preceding station	Seoul Metropolitan Subway	Following station
Hagye towards Jangam	Line 7	Taereung towards Seongnam
