= Meokgol station =

Metro station in Jungnang-gu, Seoul, South Korea

Coordinates: 37°36′38″N 127°04′40″E

먹골; Meokgol
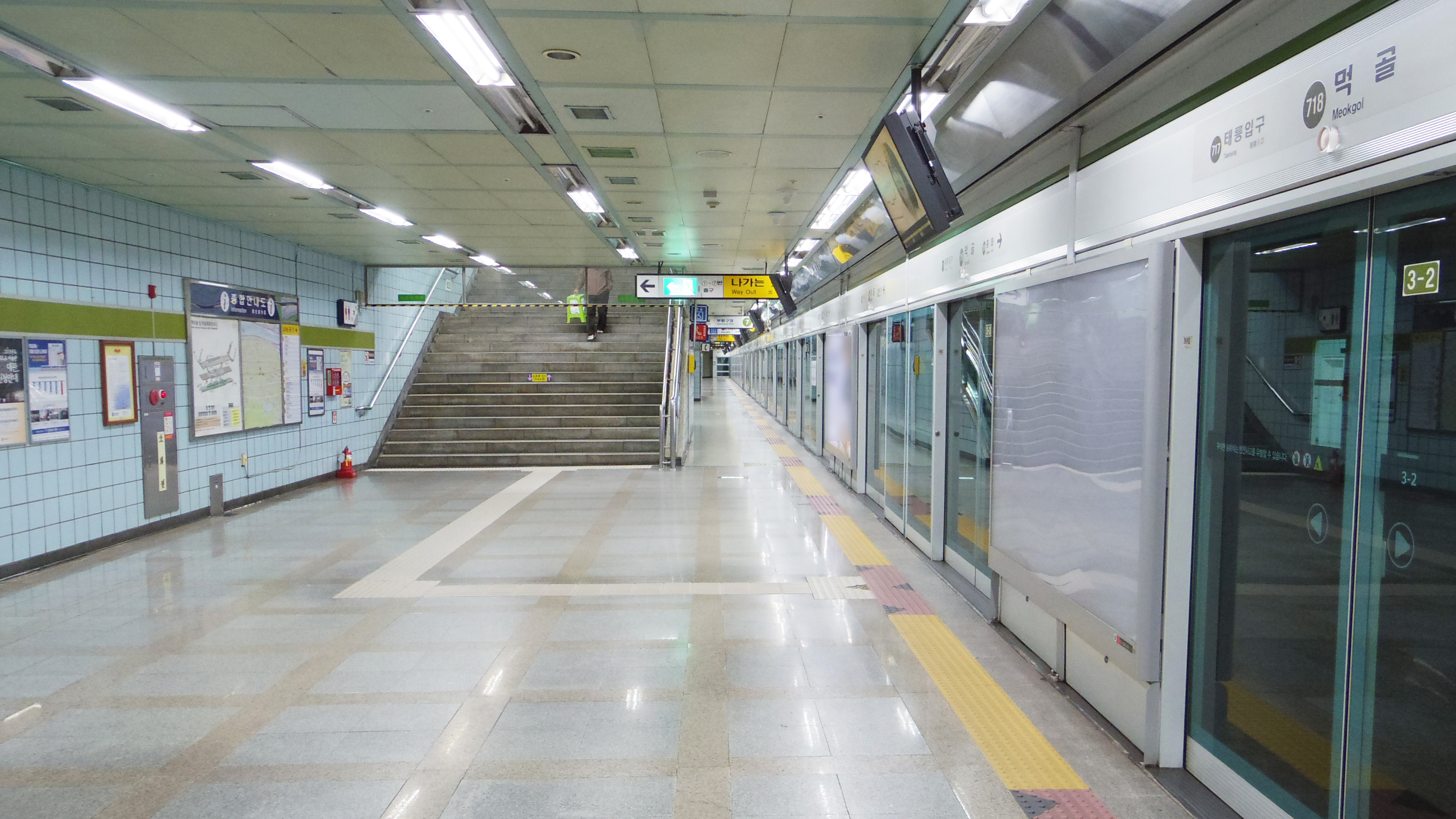
- Station Platform

Korean name
- Hangul: 먹골역
- Hanja: 먹골驛
- Revised Romanization: Meokgol-yeok
- McCune–Reischauer: Mŏkkol-yŏk

General information
- Location: 175-4 Muk-dong, Jungnang-gu, Seoul
- Operated by: Seoul Metro
- Line: Line 7
- Platforms: 2
- Tracks: 2

Construction
- Structure type: Underground

Key dates
- October 11, 1996: Line 7 opened
Location

Meokgol Station is a station on the Seoul Subway Line 7. The name of this station means "Inkstick village" in native Korean, and the neighborhood Muk-dong (묵동, 墨洞) in which the station is located is the Chinese translation of this name.

== Station layout ==
Taereung ↑
| N/B
↓ Junghwa

Southbound	← ● Line 7 toward Seongnam
Northbound	● Line 7 toward Jangam →

Preceding station	Seoul Metropolitan Subway	Following station
Taereung towards Jangam	Line 7	Junghwa towards Seongnam
