= Suraksan station =

Station of the Seoul Metropolitan Subway

수락산; Suraksan
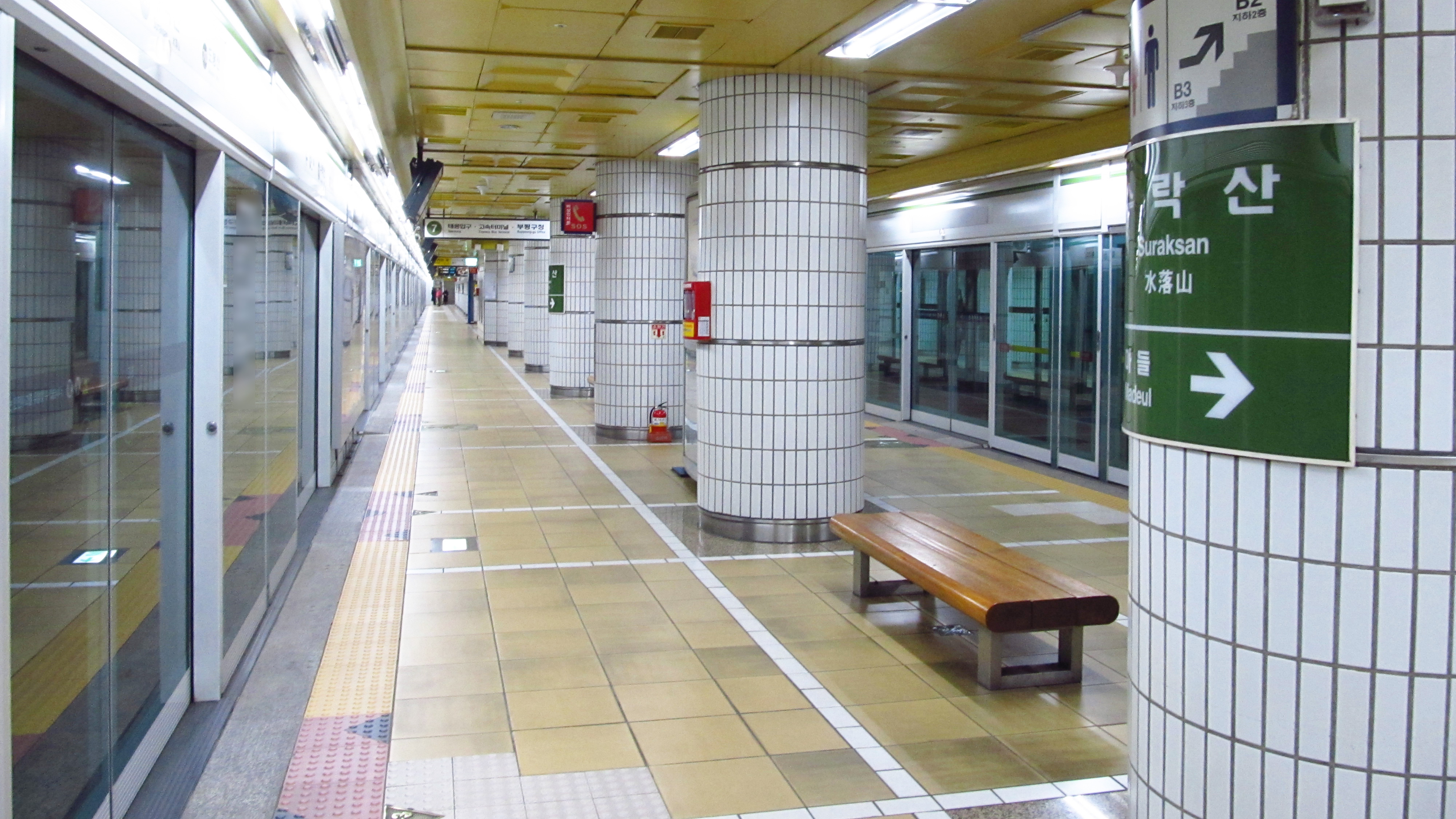
- Station Platforms

Korean name
- Hangul: 수락산역
- Hanja: 水落山驛
- Revised Romanization: Suraksannyeok
- McCune–Reischauer: Suraksannyŏk

General information
- Location: 1662 Dongil-ro Jiha, 1132-9 Sanggye 1-dong, Nowon-gu, Seoul
- Coordinates: 37°40′40″N 127°03′19″E
- Operated by: Seoul Metro
- Line(s): Line 7
- Platforms: 2
- Tracks: 3

Construction
- Structure type: Underground

History
- Opened: October 11, 1996

Suraksan Station is a station on the Seoul Subway Line 7 in Nowon-gu, Seoul. Its name comes from the nearby Suraksan mountain.

== Station layout ==
Dobongsan ↑
S/B | N/B |
↓ Madeul

Southbound	← ● Line 7 toward Seongnam
Northbound	● Line 7 toward Jangam →

Preceding station	Seoul Metropolitan Subway	Following station
Dobongsan towards Jangam	Line 7	Madeul towards Seongnam
