= Hagye station =

Metro station in Nowon-gu, Seoul, South Korea

Coordinates: 37°38′11″N 127°04′05″E

하계 (을지대 을지병원); Hagye (Eulji Medical Center)
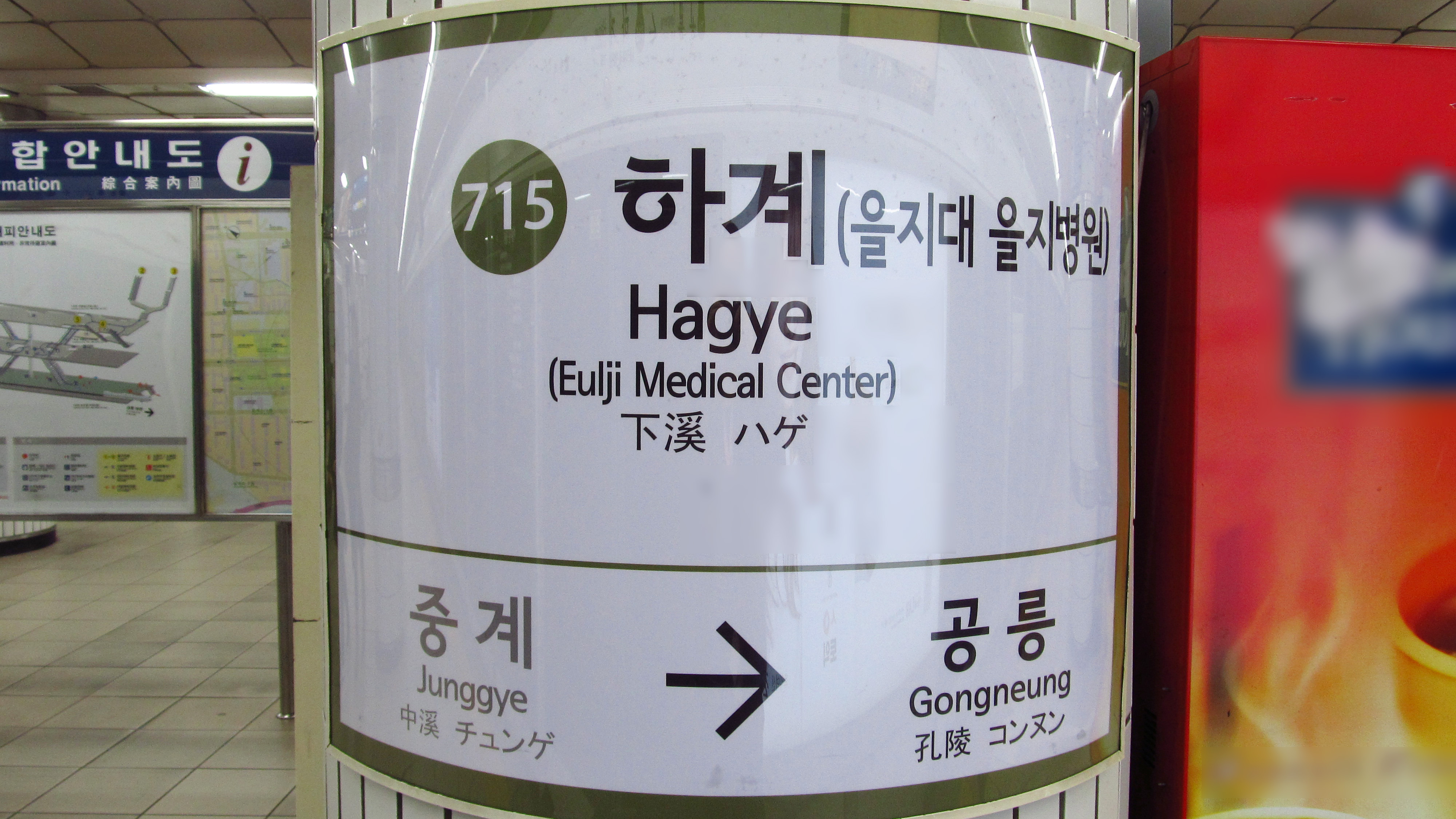
- Station sign

Korean name
- Hangul: 하계역
- Hanja: 下溪驛
- Revised Romanization: Hagye-yeok
- McCune–Reischauer: Hagye-yŏk

General information
- Location: 1196 Dongil-ro Jiha, 273-5 Hagye-dong, Nowon-gu, Seoul
- Operated by: Seoul Metro
- Line: Line 7
- Platforms: 1
- Tracks: 2

Construction
- Structure type: Underground

Key dates
- October 11, 1996: Line 7 opened

Hagye Station (Korean: 하계역) is a station on the Seoul Subway Line 7 in Nowon District, Seoul, South Korea. The name comes from the name of the dong it is located in, and is named after its location at the lower parts of Hancheon.

== Station layout ==
Junggye ↑
S/B N/B |
↓ Gongneung

Southbound	← ● Line 7 toward Seongnam
Northbound	● Line 7 toward Jangam →

Preceding station	Seoul Metropolitan Subway	Following station
Junggye towards Jangam	Line 7	Gongneung towards Seongnam
