= Nowon station =

Subway station in Seoul, South Korea

Coordinates: 37.65637°N 127.06345°E

노원; Nowon
노원; Nowon
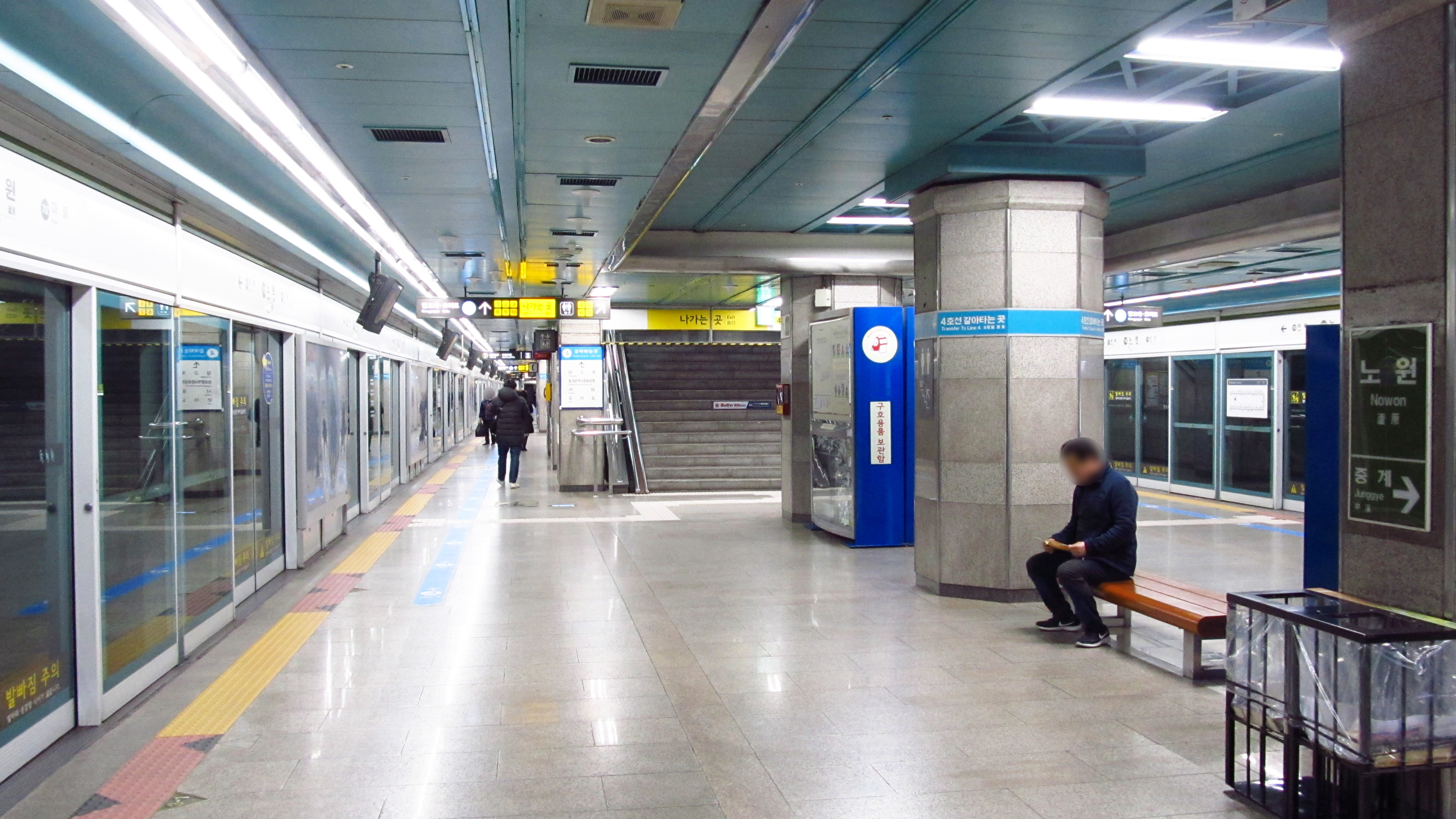
- Station Platform (Line 7)

Korean name
- Hangul: 노원역
- Hanja: 蘆原驛
- Revised Romanization: Nowon-yeok
- McCune–Reischauer: Nowŏn-yŏk

General information
- Location: 69-1 Sanggye-ro, 602-5 Sanggye 2-dong 1409 Dongil-ro Jiha, 729 Sanggye-dong; Nowon-gu, Seoul
- Operator: Seoul Metro
- Lines: Line 4 Line 7
- Platforms: 3
- Tracks: 4

Construction
- Structure type: Aboveground/Underground

Key dates
- April 20, 1985: Line 4 opened
- October 11, 1996: Line 7 opened

Passengers
- (Daily) Based on Jan-Dec of 2012. Line 4: 51,700; Line 7: 46,671

Services
Preceding station	Seoul Metropolitan Subway	Following station
Sanggye towards Jinjeop	Line 4	Chang-dong towards Oido
Madeul towards Jangam	Line 7	Junggye towards Seongnam
Location

Nowon station is a station on the Seoul Subway Line 4 and Line 7. The station on Line 4 is elevated whereas the station on Line 7 is underground, owing to the elevated tracks of Line 4 between Danggogae station and Chang-dong station. In addition, the two stations are far apart, making passengers walk a considerable distance for transfers.

Many restaurants, bars, pubs, as well as many clothing shops, accessory shops, beauty salons are located around Nowon Station. The Lotte Department Store is directly accessible from the Line 7 station.

Both the Line 4 and Line 7 stations are located in Sanggye-dong, Nowon-gu, Seoul.

== Station layout ==
=== Line 4 ===
Sanggye ↑
S/B | | N/B
↓ Chang-dong

Southbound	← ● Line 4 toward Jinjeop
Northbound	● Line 4 toward Oido →

=== Line 7 ===
Madeul ↑
S/B | | N/B
↓ Junggye

Southbound	← ● Line 7 toward Seongnam
Northbound	● Line 7 toward Jangam →

== Gallery ==
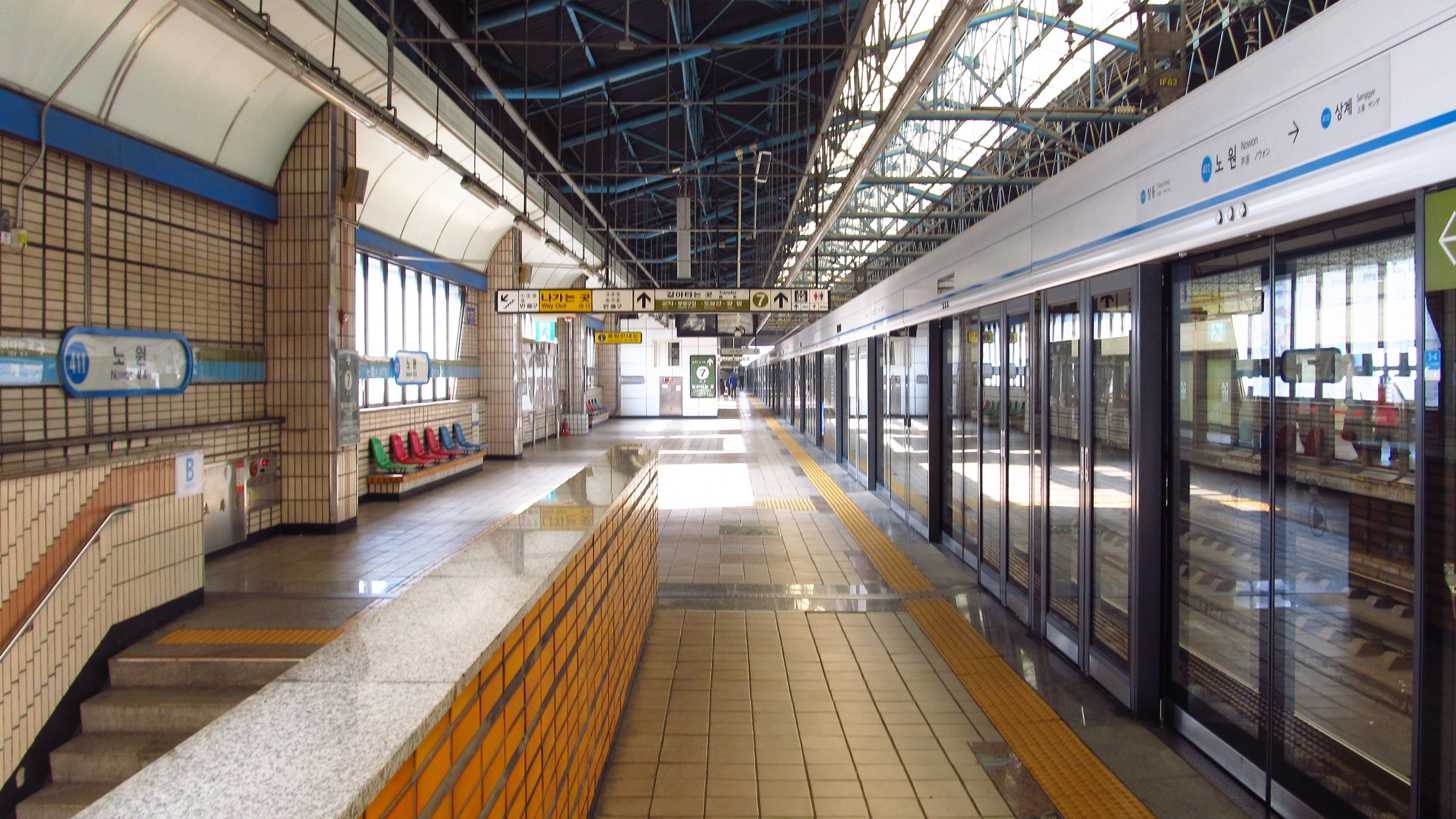
Station Platform (Line 4)
