= Taereung station =

Station of the Seoul Metropolitan Subway

Coordinates: 37°37′31.9″N 127°4′22.7″E

태릉입구; Taereung
태릉입구; Taereung
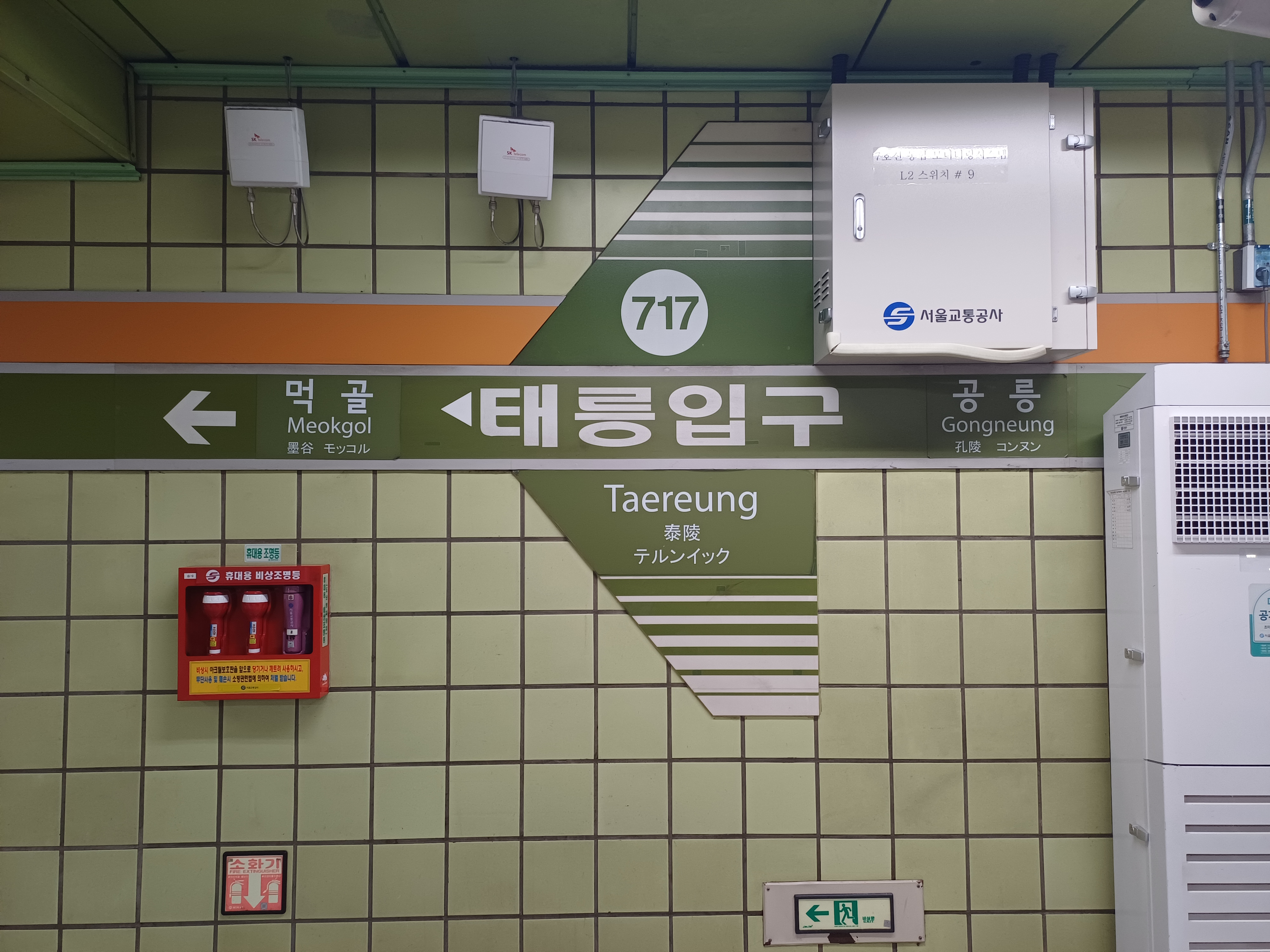
- Station nameplate (Line 7)

Korean name
- Hangul: 태릉입구역
- Hanja: 泰陵入口驛
- Revised Romanization: Taereungipgu-yeok
- McCune–Reischauer: T'aerŭng'ipku-yŏk

General information
- Location: 992-1 Dongil-ro, 616-4 Gongneung-dong, Nowon-gu, Seoul
- Operator: Seoul Metro
- Lines: Line 6 Line 7
- Platforms: 4
- Tracks: 4

Construction
- Structure type: Underground

Key dates
- August 7, 2000: Line 6 opened
- October 11, 1996: Line 7 opened
Location

Taereung station is a transfer station on Line 6 and Line 7 in Seoul, South Korea. The station is located near the entrance of Taereung Shrine, the burial site of Queen Munjeong. The station is also located near Taereung International Rifle Range, which is located in Pureundongsan Amusement Park.

== Station layout ==
=== Line 6 ===
Hwarangdae ↑
S/B | | N/B
↓ Seokgye

Southbound	← ● Line 6 toward Eungam
Northbound	● Line 6 toward Sinnae →

=== Line 7 ===
Gongneung ↑
S/B | | N/B
↓ Meokgol

Southbound	← ● Line 7 toward Seongnam
Northbound	● Line 7 toward Jangam →

== Gallery ==
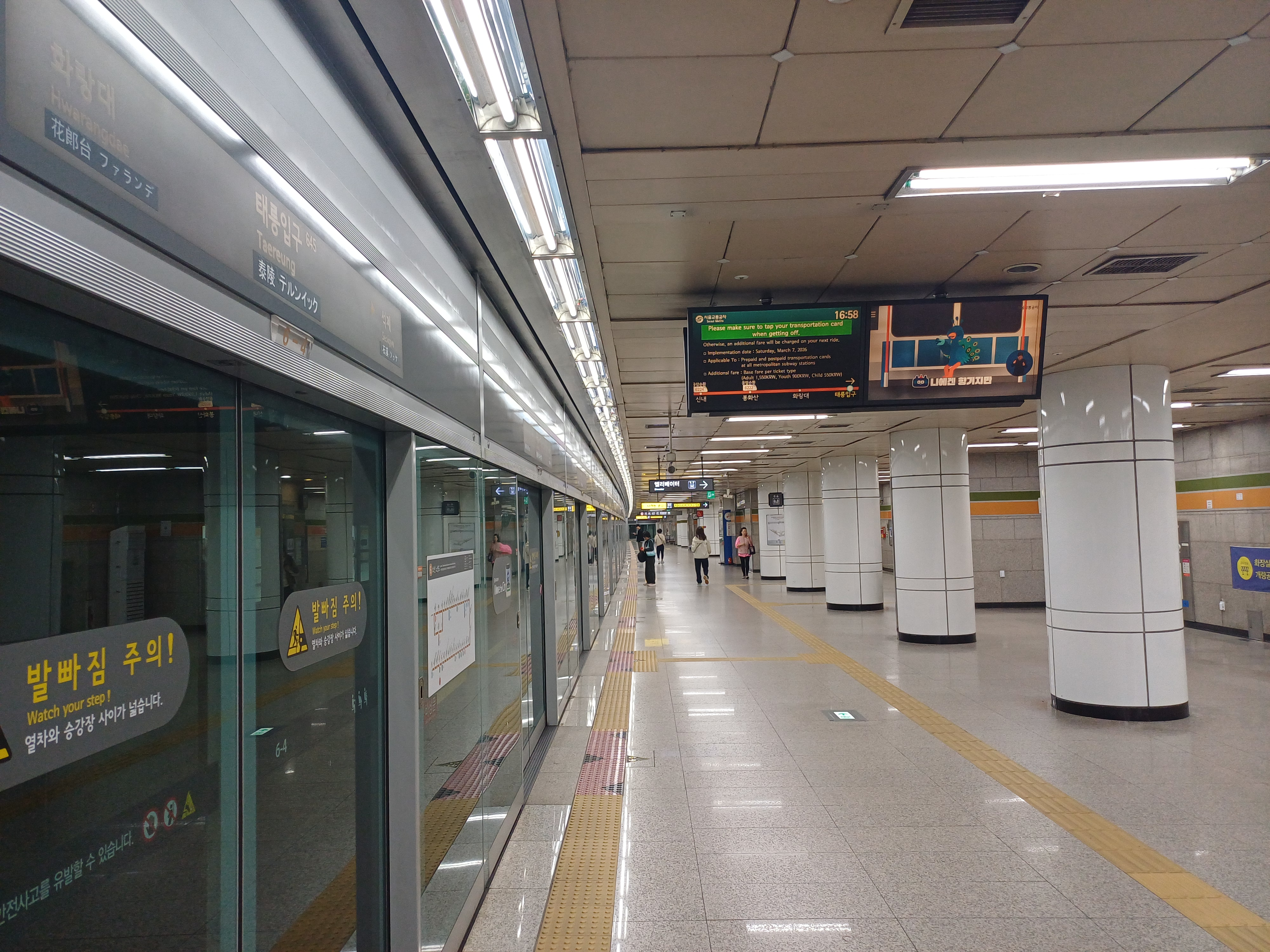
Line 6 platform

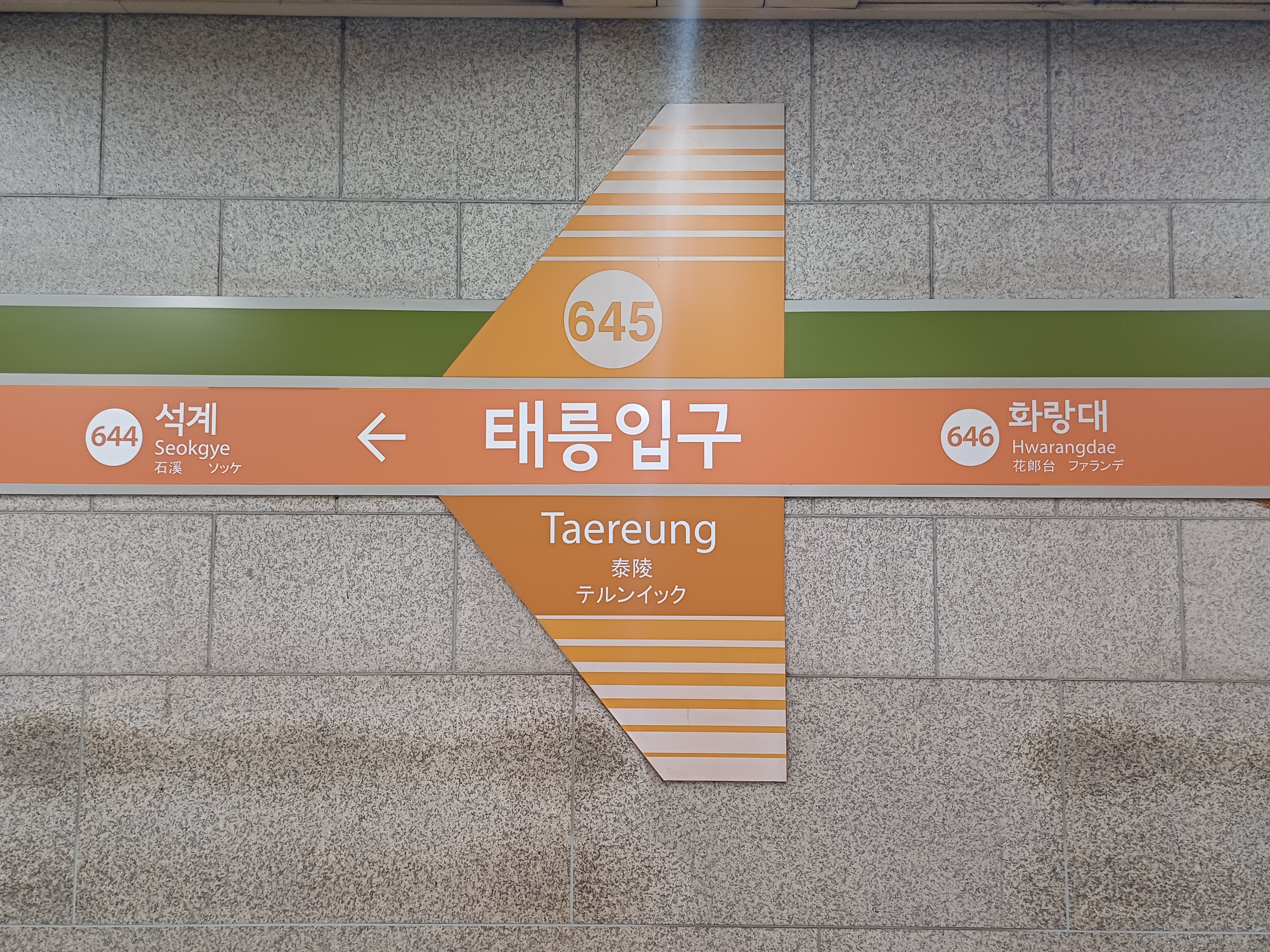
Station nameplate (Line 6)

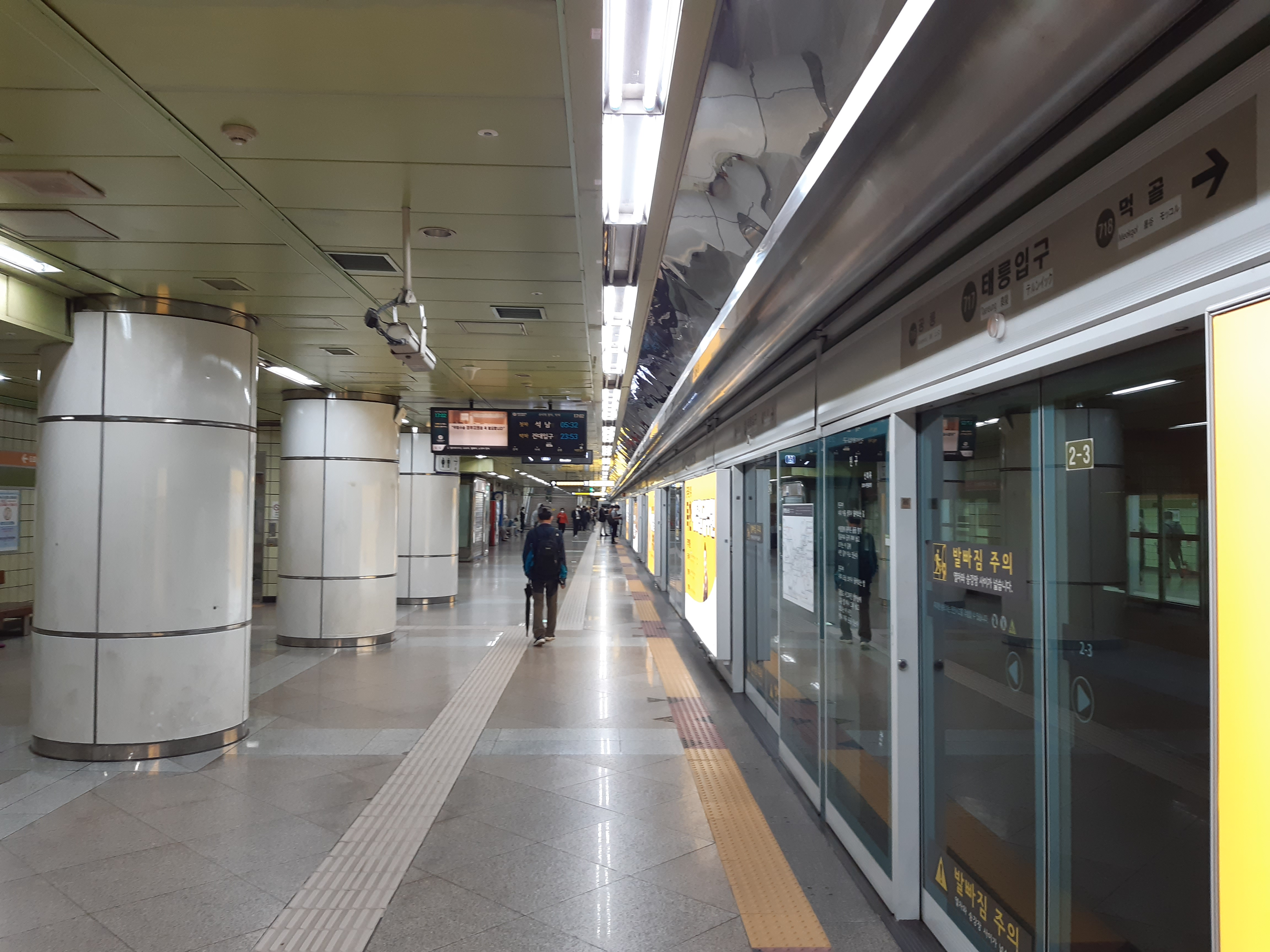
Line 7 platform

Preceding station	Seoul Metropolitan Subway	Following station
Seokgye towards Eungam	Line 6	Hwarangdae towards Sinnae
Gongneung towards Jangam	Line 7	Meokgol towards Seongnam
