= Madeul station =

Metro station in Seoul, South Korea

Coordinates: 37°39′53″N 127°03′28″E

마들; Madeul
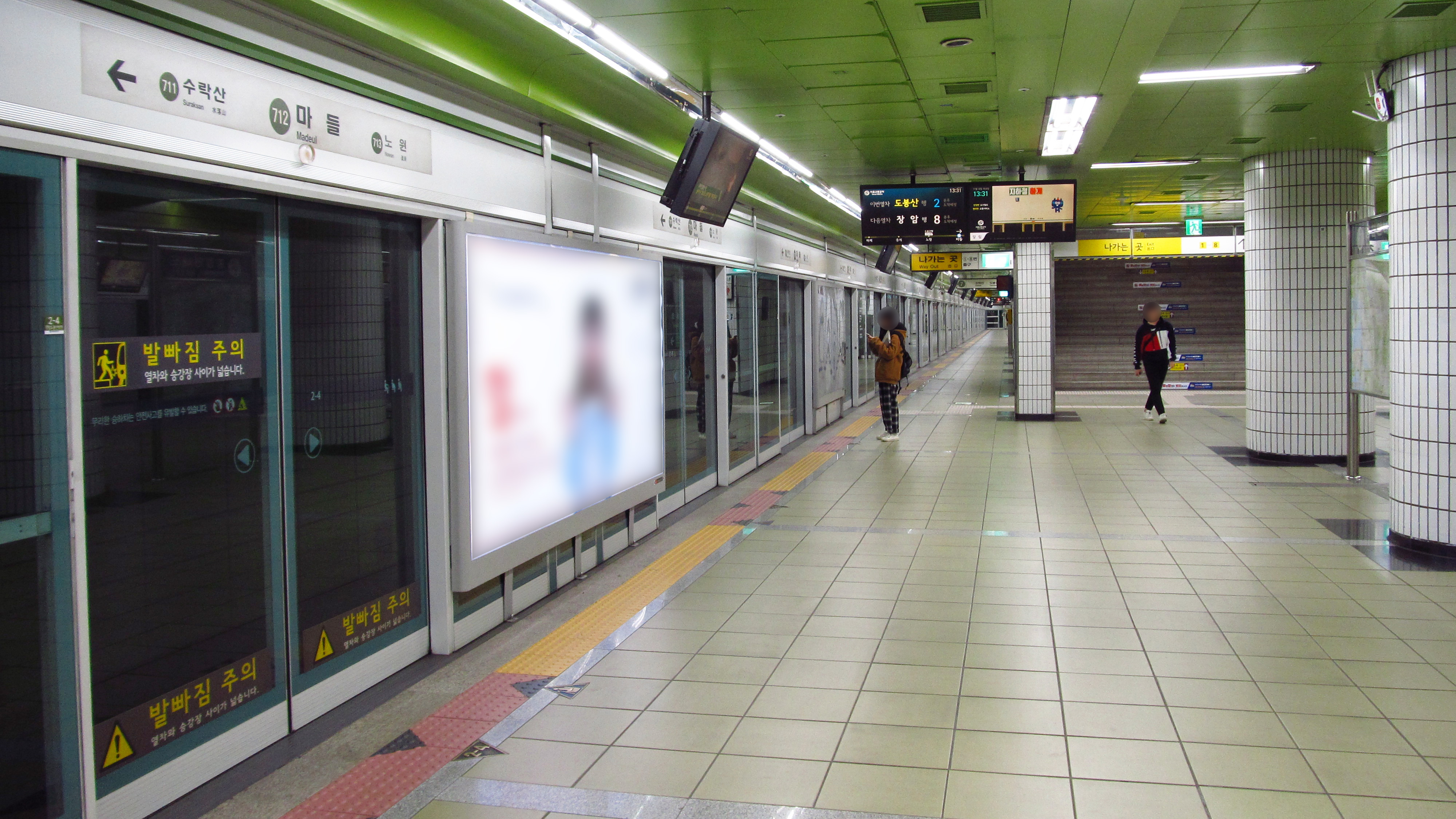
- Platform towards Jangam

Korean name
- Hangul: 마들역
- Hanja: 마들驛
- Revised Romanization: Madeul-yeok
- McCune–Reischauer: Madŭl-yŏk

General information
- Location: 647 Sanggye-dong, Nowon-gu, Seoul
- Operated by: Seoul Metro
- Line(s): Line 7
- Platforms: 1
- Tracks: 2

Construction
- Structure type: Underground

History
- Opened: October 11, 1996

Madeul Station is a station on the Seoul Subway Line 7. Its name is pure Korean, hence there is no Hanja equivalent. The name presumably comes from a nearby place where horses were kept.

== Station layout ==
Suraksan ↑
S/B N/B |
↓ Nowon

Southbound	← ● Line 7 toward Seongnam
Northbound	● Line 7 toward Jangam →

Preceding station	Seoul Metropolitan Subway	Following station
Suraksan towards Jangam	Line 7	Nowon towards Seongnam
