= Junghwa station =

Metro station in Seoul, South Korea

Coordinates: 37°36′09″N 127°04′45″E

중화; Junghwa
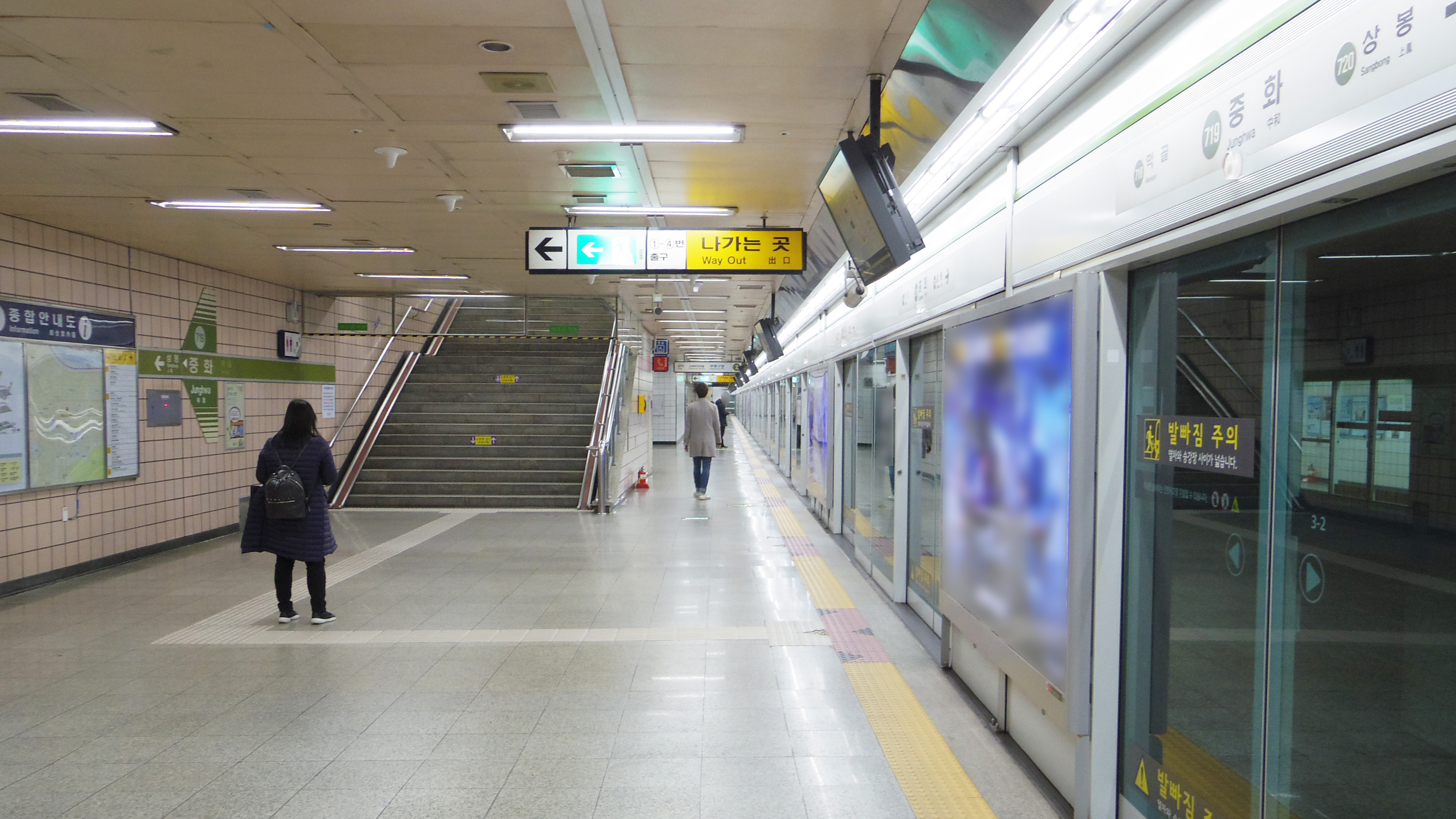
- Station Platform

Korean name
- Hangul: 중화역
- Hanja: 中和驛
- Revised Romanization: Junghwa-yeok
- McCune–Reischauer: Chunghwa-yŏk

General information
- Location: 285 Junghwa-dong, Jungnang-gu, Seoul
- Operated by: Seoul Metro
- Line(s): Line 7
- Platforms: 2
- Tracks: 2

Construction
- Structure type: Underground

Key dates
- October 11, 1996: Line 7 opened

Junghwa Station (Korean: 중화역) is a station on the Seoul Subway Line 7.

The station is located in Junghwa-dong, Jungnang-gu, on a main arterial road running broadly north to south past the western flank of Bonghwasan (a mountain). Joong Rang (sometimes written Jungnang) Middle School and Junghwa High School are situated nearby.

== Station layout ==
Meokgol ↑
| N/B
↓ Sangbong

Southbound	← ● Line 7 toward Seongnam
Northbound	● Line 7 toward Jangam →

Preceding station	Seoul Metropolitan Subway	Following station
Meokgol towards Jangam	Line 7	Sangbong towards Seongnam
