= Junggye station =

Metro station in Seoul, South Korea

중계 (한국성서대); Junggye (Korean Bible Univ.)
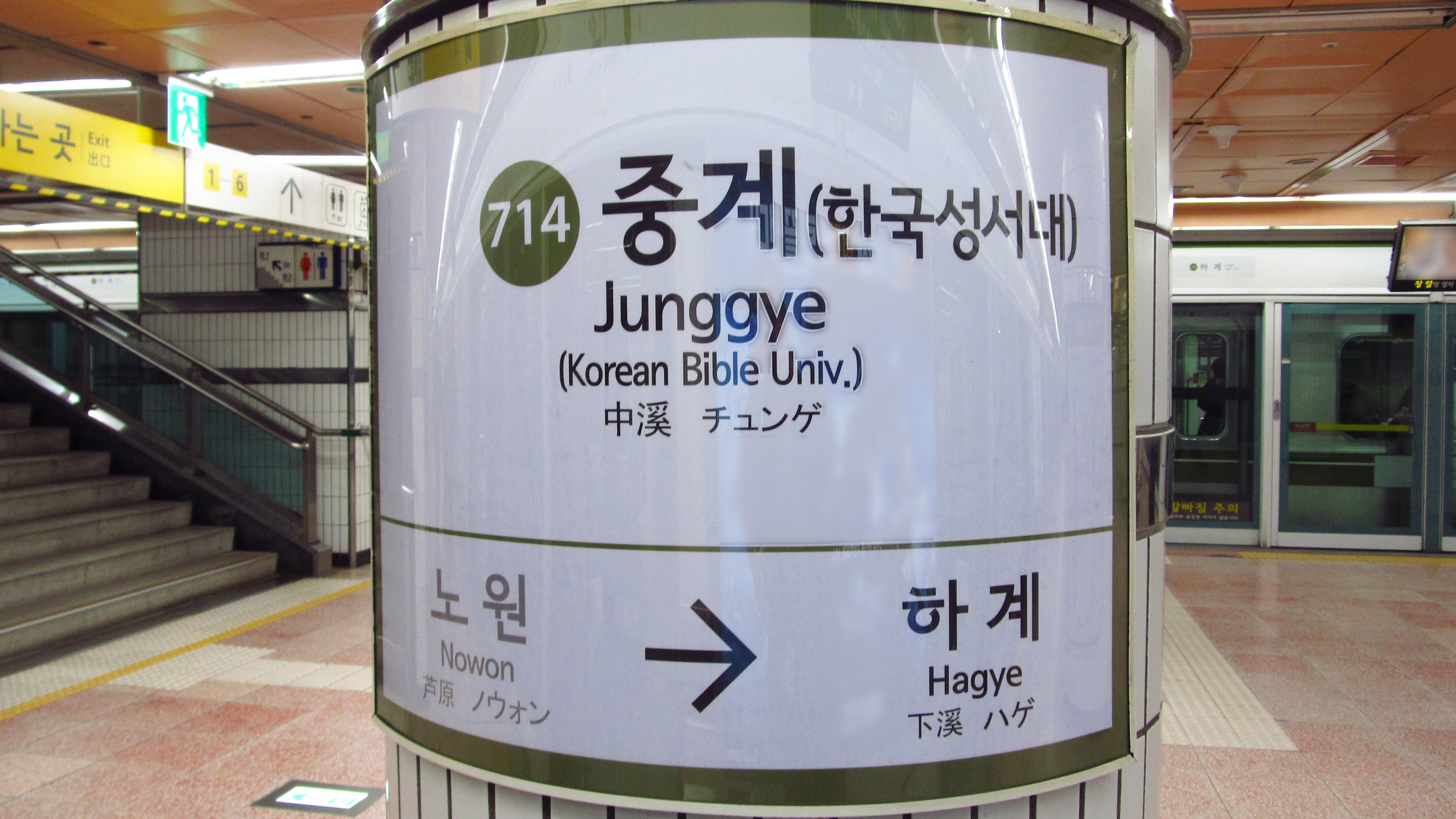
- Station Sign

Korean name
- Hangul: 중계역
- Hanja: 中溪驛
- Revised Romanization: Junggye-yeok
- McCune–Reischauer: Chunggye-yŏk

General information
- Location: 1308-1, Dongil-ro Jiha, 505-3 Junggye-dong, Nowon-gu, Seoul
- Coordinates: 37°38′42″N 127°03′51″E
- Operated by: Seoul Metro
- Line(s): Line 7
- Platforms: 1
- Tracks: 2

Construction
- Structure type: Underground

Key dates
- October 11, 1996: Line 7 opened

Junggye Station (Korean: 중계역) is a station on the Seoul Subway Line 7. Its name comes from Junggye-dong, where it is located, and means "in the middle of Hancheon".

== Station layout ==
Nowon ↑
S/B N/B |
↓ Hagye

Southbound	← ● Line 7 toward Seongnam
Northbound	● Line 7 toward Jangam →

Preceding station	Seoul Metropolitan Subway	Following station
Nowon towards Jangam	Line 7	Hagye towards Seongnam
