= Sindaebangsamgeori station =

Train station in South Korea

신대방삼거리; Sindaebangsamgeori
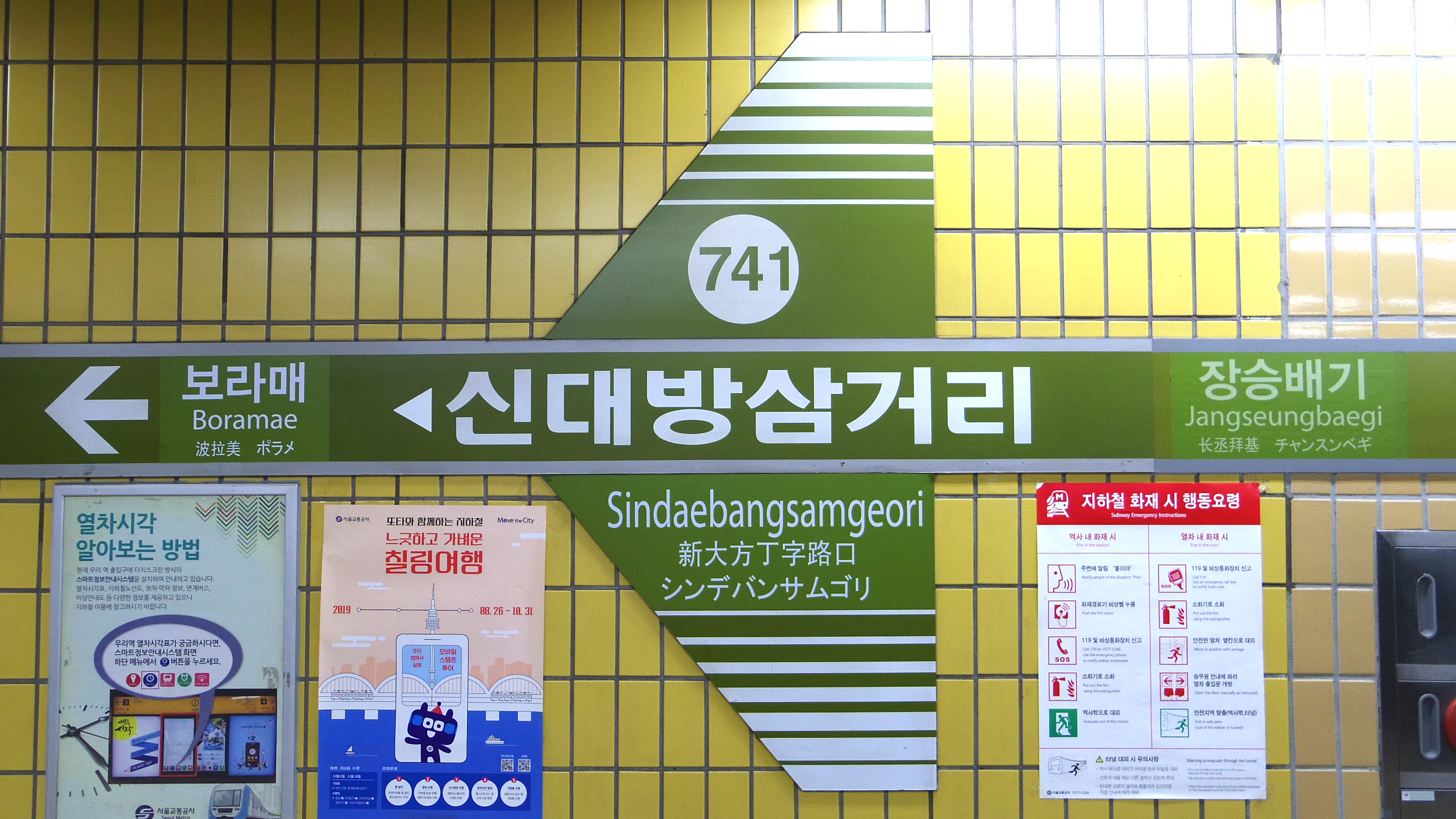

Korean name
- Hangul: 신대방삼거리역
- Hanja: 新大方삼거리驛
- Revised Romanization: Sindaebangsamgeori-yeok
- McCune–Reischauer: Sindaebangsamgŏri-yŏk

General information
- Location: 406-10 Daebang-dong, 76 Sangdoro Jiha, Dongjak-gu, Seoul
- Coordinates: 37°29′59″N 126°55′42″E
- Operated by: Seoul Metro
- Line(s): Line 7
- Platforms: 2
- Tracks: 2

Construction
- Structure type: Underground

Key dates
- August 1, 2000: Line 7 opened

Sindaebangsamgeori Station is a station on the Seoul Subway Line 7.

== Station layout ==
Jangseungbaegi ↑
| N/B
↓ Boramae

Southbound	← ● Line 7 toward Seongnam
Northbound	● Line 7 toward Jangam →

Preceding station	Seoul Metropolitan Subway	Following station
Jangseungbaegi towards Jangam	Line 7	Boramae towards Seongnam
