= List of neighborhoods in South Korea =

- Neighborhood
- Hangul: 동
- Hanja: 洞
- RR: dong
- MR: tong

Administrative neighborhood
- Hangul: 행정동
- Hanja: 行政洞
- RR: haengjeongdong
- MR: haengjŏngdong

Legal-status neighborhood
- Hangul: 법정동
- Hanja: 法定洞
- RR: beopjeongdong
- MR: pŏpchŏngdong

A haengjeongdong, haengchŏngtong, haengchongtong, or administrative neighborhood is an administrative unit in South Korea in cities. Township have smaller populations than towns and represent the rural areas of a county or city.

== List of administrative neighborhoods in South Korea ==
=== Provincial level cities ===
Neighborhood	Korean	Hanja	Provincial	Municipal	Area
Sinsa	신사동	新沙洞	Seoul	Gangnam	1.89
Nonhyeon 1	논현1동	論峴1洞	Seoul	Gangnam	1.25
Nonhyeon 2	논현2동	論峴2洞	Seoul	Gangnam	1.46
Apgujeong	압구정동	狎鷗亭洞	Seoul	Gangnam	2.53
Cheongdam	청담동	淸潭洞	Seoul	Gangnam	2.33
Samseong 1	삼성1동	三成1洞	Seoul	Gangnam	1.94
Samseong 2	삼성2동	三成2洞	Seoul	Gangnam	1.24
Daechi 1	대치1동	大峙1洞	Seoul	Gangnam	0.79
Daechi 2	대치2동	大峙2洞	Seoul	Gangnam	2.00
Daechi 4	대치4동	大峙4洞	Seoul	Gangnam	0.73
Yeoksam 1	역삼1동	驛三1洞	Seoul	Gangnam	2.35
Yeoksam 2	역삼2동	驛三2洞	Seoul	Gangnam	1.15
Dogok 1	도곡1동	道谷1洞	Seoul	Gangnam	1.02
Dogok 2	도곡2동	道谷2洞	Seoul	Gangnam	1.02
Gaepo 1	개포1동	開浦1洞	Seoul	Gangnam	1.27
Gaepo 2	개포2동	開浦2洞	Seoul	Gangnam	2.51
Gaepo 4	개포4동	開浦4洞	Seoul	Gangnam	1.49
Irwon Bon	일원본동	逸院本洞	Seoul	Gangnam	2.58
Irwon 1	일원1동	逸院1洞	Seoul	Gangnam	0.92
Irwon 2	일원2동	逸院2洞	Seoul	Gangnam	1.24
Suseo	수서동	水西洞	Seoul	Gangnam	1.43
Segok	세곡동	細谷洞	Seoul	Gangnam	6.36
Gangil	강일동	江一洞	Seoul	Gangdong	2.80
Sangil	상일동	上一洞	Seoul	Gangdong	2.66
Myeongil Je 1	명일제1동	明逸第1洞	Seoul	Gangdong	0.61
Myeongil Je 2	명일제2동	明逸第2洞	Seoul	Gangdong	0.97
Godeok Je 1	고덕제1동	高德第1洞	Seoul	Gangdong	1.73
Godeok Je 2	고덕제2동	高德第2洞	Seoul	Gangdong	2.01
Amsa Je 1	암사제1동	岩寺第1洞	Seoul	Gangdong	1.01
Amsa Je 2	암사제2동	岩寺第2洞	Seoul	Gangdong	1.18
Amsa Je 3	암사제3동	岩寺第3洞	Seoul	Gangdong	2.51
Cheonho Je 1	천호제1동	千戶第1洞	Seoul	Gangdong	0.71
Cheonho Je 2	천호제2동	千戶第2洞	Seoul	Gangdong	1.57
Cheonho Je 3	천호제3동	千戶第3洞	Seoul	Gangdong	0.79
Seongnae Je 1	성내제1동	城內第1洞	Seoul	Gangdong	0.58
Seongnae Je 2	성내제2동	城內第2洞	Seoul	Gangdong	0.67
Seongnae Je 3	성내제3동	城內第3洞	Seoul	Gangdong	0.71
Gil	길동	吉洞	Seoul	Gangdong	1.61
Dunchon Je 1	둔촌제1동	遁村第1洞	Seoul	Gangdong	0.92
Dunchon Je 2	둔촌제2동	遁村第2洞	Seoul	Gangdong	1.54
Samyang	삼양동	三陽洞	Seoul	Gangbuk	0.95
Mia	미아동	彌阿洞	Seoul	Gangbuk	0.73
Songjung	송중동	松中洞	Seoul	Gangbuk	1.22
Songcheon	송천동	松泉洞	Seoul	Gangbuk	0.88
Samgaksan	삼각산동	三角山洞	Seoul	Gangbuk	0.62
Beon Je 1	번제1동	樊第1洞	Seoul	Gangbuk	0.55
Beon Je 2	번제2동	樊第2洞	Seoul	Gangbuk	1.25
Beon Je 3	번제3동	樊第3洞	Seoul	Gangbuk	0.86
Suyu Je 1	수유제1동	水踰第1洞	Seoul	Gangbuk	1.07
Suyu Je 2	수유제2동	水踰第2洞	Seoul	Gangbuk	0.73
Suyu Je 3	수유제3동	水踰第3洞	Seoul	Gangbuk	0.86
Ui	우이동	牛耳洞	Seoul	Gangbuk	10.95
Insu	인수동	仁壽洞	Seoul	Gangbuk	2.93
Yeomchang	염창동	鹽倉洞	Seoul	Gangseo	1.74
Deungchon Je 1	등촌제1동	登村第1洞	Seoul	Gangseo	0.59
Deungchon Je 2	등촌제2동	登村第2洞	Seoul	Gangseo	0.92
Deungchon Je 3	등촌제3동	登村第3洞	Seoul	Gangseo	0.79
Hwagok Bon	화곡본동	禾谷本洞	Seoul	Gangseo	1.11
Hwagok Je 1	화곡제1동	禾谷第1洞	Seoul	Gangseo	1.12
Hwagok Je 2	화곡제2동	禾谷第2洞	Seoul	Gangseo	0.47
Hwagok Je 3	화곡제3동	禾谷第3洞	Seoul	Gangseo	0.51
Hwagok Je 4	화곡제4동	禾谷第4洞	Seoul	Gangseo	0.82
Hwagok Je 6	화곡제6동	禾谷第6洞	Seoul	Gangseo	1.11
Hwagok Je 8	화곡제8동	禾谷第8洞	Seoul	Gangseo	0.53
Ujangsan	우장산동	雨裝山洞	Seoul	Gangseo	1.36
Gayang Je 1	가양제1동	加陽第1洞	Seoul	Gangseo	4.70
Gayang Je 2	가양제2동	加陽第2洞	Seoul	Gangseo	1.00
Gayang Je 3	가양제3동	加陽第3洞	Seoul	Gangseo	0.99
Balsan Je 1	발산제1동	鉢山第1洞	Seoul	Gangseo	2.96
Gonghang	공항동	空港洞	Seoul	Gangseo	10.88
Banghwa Je 1	방화제1동	傍花第1洞	Seoul	Gangseo	1.04
Banghwa Je 2	방화제2동	傍花第2洞	Seoul	Gangseo	6.41
Banghwa Je 3	방화제3동	傍花第3洞	Seoul	Gangseo	2.38
Boramae	보라매동	洞	Seoul	Gwanak	0.76
Cheongnim	청림동	靑林洞	Seoul	Gwanak	0.30
Haengun	행운동	幸運洞	Seoul	Gwanak	0.72
Nakseongdae	낙성대동	落星垈洞	Seoul	Gwanak	2.27
Jungang	중앙동	中央洞	Seoul	Gwanak	0.39
Inheon	인헌동	仁憲洞	Seoul	Gwanak	1.08
Namhyeon	남현동	南峴洞	Seoul	Gwanak	3.27
Seowon	서원동	書院洞	Seoul	Gwanak	0.65
Sinwon	신원동	新源洞	Seoul	Gwanak	0.55
Seorim	서림동	西林洞	Seoul	Gwanak	0.99
Sinsa	신사동	新士洞	Seoul	Gwanak	0.64
Silim	신림동	新林洞	Seoul	Gwanak	0.54
Nanhyang	난향동	蘭香洞	Seoul	Gwanak	0.80
Jowon	조원동	棗園洞	Seoul	Gwanak	0.67
Daehak	대학동	大學洞	Seoul	Gwanak	8.30
Euncheon	은천동	殷川洞	Seoul	Gwanak	0.78
Seonghyeon	성현동	成賢洞	Seoul	Gwanak	0.68
Cheongryong	청룡동	靑龍洞	Seoul	Gwanak	1.18
Nangok	난곡동	蘭谷洞	Seoul	Gwanak	0.96
Samseong	삼성동	三聖洞	Seoul	Gwanak	2.66
Miseong	미성동	美星洞	Seoul	Gwanak	1.38
Junggok Je 1	중곡제1동	中谷第1洞	Seoul	Gwangjin	0.62
Junggok Je 2	중곡제2동	中谷第2洞	Seoul	Gwangjin	0.55
Junggok Je 3	중곡제3동	中谷第3洞	Seoul	Gwangjin	0.60
Junggok Je 4	중곡제4동	中谷第4洞	Seoul	Gwangjin	2.32
Neung	능동	陵洞	Seoul	Gwangjin	1.10
Guui Je 1	구의제1동	九宜第1洞	Seoul	Gwangjin	0.56
Guui Je 2	구의제2동	九宜第2洞	Seoul	Gwangjin	1.39
Guui Je 3	구의제3동	九宜第3洞	Seoul	Gwangjin	1.02
Gwangjang	광장동	廣壯洞	Seoul	Gwangjin	2.39
Jayang Je 1	자양제1동	紫陽第1洞	Seoul	Gwangjin	0.57
Jayang Je 2	자양제2동	紫陽第2洞	Seoul	Gwangjin	1.68
Jayang Je 3	자양제3동	紫陽第3洞	Seoul	Gwangjin	1.20
Jayang Je 4	자양제4동	紫陽第4洞	Seoul	Gwangjin	1.16
Hwayang	화양동	華陽洞	Seoul	Gwangjin	1.16
Gunja	군자동	君子洞	Seoul	Gwangjin	0.74
Sindorim	신도림동	新道林洞	Seoul	Guro	1.47
Guro Je 1	구로제1동	九老第1洞	Seoul	Guro	1.02
Guro Je 2	구로제2동	九老第2洞	Seoul	Guro	1.76
Guro Je 3	구로제3동	九老第3洞	Seoul	Guro	1.02
Guro Je 4	구로제4동	九老第4洞	Seoul	Guro	0.46
Guro Je 5	구로제5동	九老第5洞	Seoul	Guro	1.03
Garibong	가리봉동	加里峰洞	Seoul	Guro	0.40
Gocheok Je 1	고척제1동	高尺第1洞	Seoul	Guro	1.16
Gocheok Je 2	고척제2동	高尺第2洞	Seoul	Guro	1.02
Gaebong Je 1	개봉제1동	開峰第1洞	Seoul	Guro	1.31
Gaebong Je 2	개봉제2동	開峰第2洞	Seoul	Guro	0.80
Gaebong Je 3	개봉제3동	開峰第3洞	Seoul	Guro	0.81
Oryu Je 1	오류제1동	梧柳第1洞	Seoul	Guro	0.59
Oryu Je 2	오류제2동	梧柳第2洞	Seoul	Guro	4.60
Sugung	수궁동	水宮洞	Seoul	Guro	2.67
Gasan	가산동	加山洞	Seoul	Geumcheon	2.50
Doksan Je 1	독산제1동	禿山第1洞	Seoul	Geumcheon	2.08
Doksan Je 2	독산제2동	禿山第2洞	Seoul	Geumcheon	0.61
Doksan Je 3	독산제3동	禿山第3洞	Seoul	Geumcheon	0.92
Doksan Je 4	독산제4동	禿山第4洞	Seoul	Geumcheon	0.59
Siheung Je 1	시흥제1동	始興第1洞	Seoul	Geumcheon	1.71
Siheung Je 2	시흥제2동	始興第2洞	Seoul	Geumcheon	1.26
Siheung Je 3	시흥제3동	始興第3洞	Seoul	Geumcheon	1.07
Siheung Je 4	시흥제4동	始興第4洞	Seoul	Geumcheon	0.87
Siheung Je 5	시흥제5동	始興第5洞	Seoul	Geumcheon	1.39
Wolgye 1	월계1동	月溪1洞	Seoul	Nowon	1.16
Wolgye 2	월계2동	月溪2洞	Seoul	Nowon	1.94
Wolgye 3	월계3동	月溪3洞	Seoul	Nowon	1.17
Gongneung 1	공릉1동	孔陵1洞	Seoul	Nowon	1.41
Gongneung 2	공릉2동	孔陵2洞	Seoul	Nowon	6.82
Hagye 1	하계1동	下溪1洞	Seoul	Nowon	1.55
Hagye 2	하계2동	下溪2洞	Seoul	Nowon	0.51
Junggye Bon	중계본동	中溪本洞	Seoul	Nowon	1.97
Junggye 1	중계1동	中溪1洞	Seoul	Nowon	0.63
Junggye 2·3	중계2·3동	中溪2·3洞	Seoul	Nowon	1.70
Junggye 4	중계4동	中溪4洞	Seoul	Nowon	0.90
Sanggye 1	상계1동	上溪1洞	Seoul	Nowon	5.62
Sanggye 2	상계2동	上溪2洞	Seoul	Nowon	0.61
Sanggye 3·4	상계3·4동	上溪3·4洞	Seoul	Nowon	5.62
Sanggye 5	상계5동	上溪5洞	Seoul	Nowon	0.44
Sanggye 6·7	상계6·7동	上溪6·7洞	Seoul	Nowon	1.11
Sanggye 8	상계8동	上溪8洞	Seoul	Nowon	0.67
Sanggye 9	상계9동	上溪9洞	Seoul	Nowon	0.81
Sanggye 10	상계10동	上溪10洞	Seoul	Nowon	0.80
Banghak Je 1	쌍문제1동	雙門第1洞	Seoul	Dobong	1.24
Banghak Je 2	쌍문제2동	雙門第2洞	Seoul	Dobong	0.54
Banghak Je 3	쌍문제3동	雙門第3洞	Seoul	Dobong	0.50
Banghak Je 4	쌍문제4동	雙門第4洞	Seoul	Dobong	0.52
Banghak Je 1	방학제1동	放鶴第1洞	Seoul	Dobong	0.69
Banghak Je 2	방학제2동	放鶴第2洞	Seoul	Dobong	0.74
Banghak Je 3	방학제3동	放鶴第3洞	Seoul	Dobong	2.64
Chang Je 1	창제1동	倉第1洞	Seoul	Dobong	0.88
Chang Je 2	창제2동	倉第2洞	Seoul	Dobong	1.07
Chang Je 3	창제3동	倉第3洞	Seoul	Dobong	0.67
Chang Je 4	창제4동	倉第4洞	Seoul	Dobong	0.96
Chang Je 5	창제5동	倉第5洞	Seoul	Dobong	0.70
Dobong Je 1	도봉제1동	道峰第1洞	Seoul	Dobong	8.72
Dobong Je 2	도봉제2동	道峰第2洞	Seoul	Dobong	0.83
Yongsin	용신동	龍新洞	Seoul	Dongdaemun	1.61
Jegi	제기동	祭基洞	Seoul	Dongdaemun	1.18
Jeonnong Je 1	전농제1동	典農第1洞	Seoul	Dongdaemun	1.19
Jeonnong Je 2	전농제2동	典農第2洞	Seoul	Dongdaemun	0.86
Dapsimni Je 1	답십리제1동	踏十里第1洞	Seoul	Dongdaemun	0.86
Dapsimni Je 2	답십리제2동	踏十里第2洞	Seoul	Dongdaemun	0.80
Jangan Je 1	장안제1동	長安第1洞	Seoul	Dongdaemun	1.25
Jangan Je 2	장안제2동	長安第2洞	Seoul	Dongdaemun	1.08
Cheongnyangni	청량리동	淸凉里洞	Seoul	Dongdaemun	1.20
Hoegi	회기동	回基洞	Seoul	Dongdaemun	0.76
Hwigyeong Je 1	휘경제1동	徽慶第1洞	Seoul	Dongdaemun	0.63
Hwigyeong Je 2	휘경제2동	徽慶第2洞	Seoul	Dongdaemun	1.05
Imun Je 1	이문제1동	里門第1洞	Seoul	Dongdaemun	1.04
Imun Je 2	이문제2동	里門第2洞	Seoul	Dongdaemun	0.69
Noryangjin Je 1	노량진제1동	鷺梁津第1洞	Seoul	Dongjak	1.58
Noryangjin Je 2	노량진제2동	鷺梁津第2洞	Seoul	Dongjak	0.65
Sangdo Je 1	상도제1동	上道第1洞	Seoul	Dongjak	1.51
Sangdo Je 2	상도제2동	上道第2洞	Seoul	Dongjak	0.97
Sangdo Je 3	상도제3동	上道第3洞	Seoul	Dongjak	0.60
Sangdo Je 4	상도제4동	上道第4洞	Seoul	Dongjak	0.75
Heukseok	흑석동	黑石洞	Seoul	Dongjak	1.68
Sadang Je 1	사당제1동	舍堂第1洞	Seoul	Dongjak	0.79
Sadang Je 2	사당제2동	舍堂第2洞	Seoul	Dongjak	2.75
Sadang Je 3	사당제3동	舍堂第3洞	Seoul	Dongjak	0.92
Sadang Je 4	사당제4동	舍堂第4洞	Seoul	Dongjak	0.38
Sadang Je 5	사당제5동	舍堂第5洞	Seoul	Donning	0.57
Daebang	대방동	大方洞	Seoul	Dongjak	1.55
Sindaebang Je 1	신대방제1동	新大方第1洞	Seoul	Dongjak	0.62
Sindaebang Je 2	신대방제2동	新大方第2洞	Seoul	Dongjak	1.03
Gongdeok	공덕동	孔德洞	Seoul	Mapo	1.01
Ahyeon	아현동	阿峴洞	Seoul	Mapo	0.76
Dohwa	도화동	桃花洞	Seoul	Mapo	0.62
Yonggang	용강동	龍江洞	Seoul	Mapo	0.84
Daeheung	대흥동	大興洞	Seoul	Mapo	0.88
Yeomni	염리동	鹽里洞	Seoul	Mapo	0.43
Sinsu	신수동	新水洞	Seoul	Mapo	0.78
Seogang	서강동	西江洞	Seoul	Mapo	1.45
Seogyo	서교동	西橋洞	Seoul	Mapo	1.65
Hapjeong	합정동	合井洞	Seoul	Mapo	1.69
Mangwon Je 1	망원제1동	望遠第1洞	Seoul	Mapo	1.14
Mangwon Je 2	망원제2동	望遠第2洞	Seoul	Mapo	0.67
Yeonnam	연남동	延南洞	Seoul	Mapo	0.65
Seongsan Je 1	성산제1동	城山第1洞	Seoul	Mapo	0.80
Seongsan Je 2	성산제2동	城山第2洞	Seoul	Mapo	2.07
Sangam	상암동	上岩洞	Seoul	Mapo	8.40
Chunghyeon	충현동	忠峴洞	Seoul	Seodaemun	1.08
Cheonyeon	천연동	天然洞	Seoul	Seodaemun	0.97
Bugahyeon	북아현동	北阿峴洞	Seoul	Seodaemun	0.46
Sinchon	신촌동	新村洞	Seoul	Seodaemun	2.63
Yeonhui	연희동	延禧洞	Seoul	Seodaemun	3.05
Hongje Je 1	홍제제1동	弘濟第1洞	Seoul	Seodaemun	1.23
Hongje Je 2	홍제제2동	弘濟第2洞	Seoul	Seodaemun	1.06
Hongje Je 3	홍제제3동	弘濟第3洞	Seoul	Seodaemun	0.82
Hongeun Je 1	홍은제1동	弘恩第1洞	Seoul	Seodaemun	1.58
Hongeun Je 2	홍은제2동	弘恩第2洞	Seoul	Seodaemun	2.06
Namgajwa Je 1	남가좌제1동	南加佐第1洞	Seoul	Seodaemun	0.49
Namgajwa Je 2	남가좌제2동	南加佐第2洞	Seoul	Seodaemun	0.78
Bukgajwa Je 1	북가좌제1동	北加佐第1洞	Seoul	Seodaemun	0.54
Bukgajwa Je 2	북가좌제2동	北加佐第2洞	Seoul	Seodaemun	0.85
Seocho 1	서초1동	瑞草1洞	Seoul	Seocho	1.42
Seocho 2	서초2동	瑞草2洞	Seoul	Seocho	1.24
Seocho 3	서초3동	瑞草3洞	Seoul	Seocho	2.93
Seocho 4	서초4동	瑞草4洞	Seoul	Seocho	0.88
Jamwon	잠원동	蠶院洞	Seoul	Seocho	1.76
Banpo Bon	반포본동	盤浦本洞	Seoul	Seocho	1.01
Banpo 1	반포1동	盤浦1洞	Seoul	Seocho	1.00
Banpo 2	반포2동	盤浦2洞	Seoul	Seocho	1.35
Banpo 3	반포3동	盤浦3洞	Seoul	Seocho	1.28
Banpo 4	반포4동	盤浦4洞	Seoul	Seocho	1.43
Bangbae Bon	방배본동	方背本洞	Seoul	Seocho	0.67
Bangbae 1	방배1동	方背1洞	Seoul	Seocho	0.70
Bangbae 2	방배2동	方背2洞	Seoul	Seocho	1.93
Bangbae 3	방배3동	方背3洞	Seoul	Seocho	2.40
Bangbae 4	방배4동	方背4洞	Seoul	Seocho	0.98
Yangjae 1	양재1동	良才1洞	Seoul	Seocho	5.76
Yangjae 2	양재2동	良才2洞	Seoul	Seocho	7.58
Naegok	내곡동	內谷洞	Seoul	Seocho	12.68
Wangsimni Je 2	왕십리제2동	往十里第2洞	Seoul	Seongdong	0.41
Wangsimni Doseon	왕십리도선동	往十里道詵洞	Seoul	Seongdong	0.72
Majang	마장동	馬場洞	Seoul	Seongdong	1.06
Sageun	사근동	沙斤洞	Seoul	Seongdong	1.11
Haengdang Je 1	행당제1동	杏堂第1洞	Seoul	Seongdong	0.59
Haengdang Je 2	행당제2동	杏堂第2洞	Seoul	Seongdong	0.42
Eungbong	응봉동	鷹峰洞	Seoul	Seongdong	0.57
Geumho 1 Ga	금호1가동	金湖1街洞	Seoul	Seongdong	0.46
Geumho 2·3 Ga	금호2·3가동	金湖2·3街洞	Seoul	Seongdong	0.64
Geumho 4 Ga	금호4가동	金湖4街洞	Seoul	Seongdong	0.84
Seongsu 1 Ga Je 1	성수1가제1동	聖水1街第1洞	Seoul	Seongdong	1.98
Seongsu 1 Ga Je 2	성수1가제2동	聖水1街第2洞	Seoul	Seongdong	0.89
Seongsu 2 Ga Je 1	성수2가제1동	聖水2街第1洞	Seoul	Seongdong	1.18
Seongsu 2 Ga Je 3	성수2가제3동	聖水2街第3洞	Seoul	Seongdong	1.03
Songjeong	송정동	松亭洞	Seoul	Seongdong	0.68
Yongdap	용답동	龍踏洞	Seoul	Seongdong	2.32
Oksu	옥수동	玉水洞	Seoul	Seongdong	1.95
Seongbuk	성북동	城北洞	Seoul	Seongbuk	2.85
Samseon	삼선동	三仙洞	Seoul	Seongbuk	0.89
Dongseon	동선동	東仙洞	Seoul	Seongbuk	0.72
Donam Je 1	돈암제1동	敦岩第1洞	Seoul	Seongbuk	0.49
Donam Je 2	돈암제2동	敦岩第2洞	Seoul	Seongbuk	0.55
Anam	안암동	安岩洞	Seoul	Seongbuk	1.32
Bomun	보문동	普門洞	Seoul	Seongbuk	0.55
Jeongneung Je 1	정릉제1동	貞陵第1洞	Seoul	Seongbuk	0.48
Jeongneung Je 2	정릉제2동	貞陵第2洞	Seoul	Seongbuk	1.23
Jeongneung Je 3	정릉제3동	貞陵第3洞	Seoul	Seongbuk	3.58
Jeongneung Je 4	정릉제4동	貞陵第4洞	Seoul	Seongbuk	3.18
Gireum Je 1	길음제1동	吉音第1洞	Seoul	Seongbuk	0.74
Gireum Je 2	길음제2동	吉音第2洞	Seoul	Seongbuk	0.58
Jongam	종암동	鍾岩洞	Seoul	Seongbuk	1.46
Wolgok Je 1	월곡제1동	月谷第1洞	Seoul	Seongbuk	0.83
Wolgok Je 2	월곡제2동	月谷第2洞	Seoul	Seongbuk	1.34
Jangwi Je 1	장위제1동	長位第1洞	Seoul	Seongbuk	0.72
Jangwi Je 2	장위제2동	長位第2洞	Seoul	Seongbuk	0.82
Jangwi Je 3	장위제3동	長位第3洞	Seoul	Seongbuk	0.56
Seokgwan	석관동	石串洞	Seoul	Seongbuk	1.68
Pungnap 1	풍납1동	風納1洞	Seoul	Songpa	0.77
Pungnap 2	풍납2동	風納2洞	Seoul	Songpa	1.59
Geoyeo 1	거여1동	巨餘1洞	Seoul	Songpa	0.67
Geoyeo 2	거여2동	巨餘2洞	Seoul	Songpa	1.69
Macheon 1	마천1동	馬川1洞	Seoul	Songpa	0.55
Macheon 2	마천2동	馬川2洞	Seoul	Songpa	0.92
Bangi 1	방이1동	芳荑1洞	Seoul	Songpa	0.50
Bangi 2	방이2동	芳荑2洞	Seoul	Songpa	0.80
Oryun	오륜동	五輪洞	Seoul	Songpa	3.17
Ogeum	오금동	梧琴洞	Seoul	Songpa	1.65
Songpa 1	송파1동	松坡1洞	Seoul	Songpa	0.79
Songpa 2	송파2동	松坡2洞	Seoul	Songpa	0.53
Seokchon	석촌동	石村洞	Seoul	Songpa	0.95
Samjeon	삼전동	三田洞	Seoul	Songpa	0.95
Garak Bon	가락본동	可樂本洞	Seoul	Songpa	1.13
Garak 1	가락1동	可樂1洞	Seoul	Songpa	1.34
Garak 2	가락2동	可樂2洞	Seoul	Songpa	0.96
Munjeong 1	문정1동	文井1洞	Seoul	Songpa	0.56
Munjeong 2	문정2동	文井2洞	Seoul	Songpa	2.20
Jangji	장지동	長旨洞	Seoul	Songpa	1.37
Wirye	위례동	慰禮洞	Seoul	Songpa	1.23
Jamsil Bon	잠실본동	蠶室本洞	Seoul	Songpa	0.94
Jamsil 2	잠실2동	蠶室2洞	Seoul	Songpa	2.18
Jamsil 3	잠실3동	蠶室3洞	Seoul	Songpa	1.49
Jamsil 4	잠실4동	蠶室4洞	Seoul	Songpa	1.56
Jamsil 6	잠실6동	蠶室6洞	Seoul	Songpa	2.79
Jamsil 7	잠실7동	蠶室7洞	Seoul	Songpa	0.60
Mok 1	목1동	木1洞	Seoul	Yangcheon	1.41
Mok 2	목2동	木2洞	Seoul	Yangcheon	1.03
Mok 3	목3동	木3洞	Seoul	Yangcheon	0.53
Mok 4	목4동	木4洞	Seoul	Yangcheon	0.57
Mok 5	목5동	木5洞	Seoul	Yangcheon	1.80
Sinwol 1	신월1동	新月1洞	Seoul	Yangcheon	0.65
Sinwol 2	신월2동	新月2洞	Seoul	Yangcheon	0.61
Sinwol 3	신월3동	新月3洞	Seoul	Yangcheon	0.87
Sinwol 4	신월4동	新月4洞	Seoul	Yangcheon	0.52
Sinwol 5	신월5동	新月5洞	Seoul	Yangcheon	0.69
Sinwol 6	신월6동	新月6洞	Seoul	Yangcheon	0.41
Sinwol 7	신월7동	新月7洞	Seoul	Yangcheon	1.19
Sinjeong 1	신정1동	新亭1洞	Seoul	Yangcheon	0.70
Sinjeong 2	신정2동	新亭2洞	Seoul	Yangcheon	0.52
Sinjeong 3	신정3동	新亭3洞	Seoul	Yangcheon	2.72
Sinjeong 4	신정4동	新亭4洞	Seoul	Yangcheon	1.01
Sinjeong 6	신정6동	新亭6洞	Seoul	Yangcheon	0.96
Sinjeong 7	신정7동	新亭7洞	Seoul	Yangcheon	1.21
Yeongdeungpo Bon	영등포본동	永登浦本洞	Seoul	Yeongdeungpo	1.02
Yeongdeungpo	영등포동	永登浦洞	Seoul	Yeongdeungpo	1.26
Yeoui	여의동	汝矣洞	Seoul	Yeongdeungpo	8.40
Dangsan Je 1	당산제1동	堂山第1洞	Seoul	Yeongdeungpo	0.75
Dangsan Je 2	당산제2동	堂山第2洞	Seoul	Yeongdeungpo	1.55
Dorim	도림동	道林洞	Seoul	Yeongdeungpo	0.89
Mullae	문래동	文來洞	Seoul	Yeongdeungpo	1.49
Yangpyeong Je 1	양평제1동	楊坪第1洞	Seoul	Yeongdeungpo	0.88
Yangpyeong Je 2	양평제2동	楊坪第2洞	Seoul	Yeongdeungpo	3.00
Singil Je 1	신길제1동	新吉第1洞	Seoul	Yeongdeungpo	0.66
Singil Je 3	신길제3동	新吉第3洞	Seoul	Yeongdeungpo	0.48
Singil Je 4	신길제4동	新吉第4洞	Seoul	Yeongdeungpo	0.35
Singil Je 5	신길제5동	新吉第5洞	Seoul	Yeongdeungpo	0.47
Singil Je 6	신길제6동	新吉第6洞	Seoul	Yeongdeungpo	0.68
Singil Je 7	신길제7동	新吉第7洞	Seoul	Yeongdeungpo	0.64
Daerim Je 1	대림제1동	大林第1洞	Seoul	Yeongdeungpo	0.49
Daerim Je 2	대림제2동	大林第2洞	Seoul	Yeongdeungpo	0.55
Daerim Je 3	대림제3동	大林第3洞	Seoul	Yeongdeungpo	1.00
Huam	후암동	厚岩洞	Seoul	Yongsan	0.86
Yongsan 2 Ga	용산2가동	龍山2街洞	Seoul	Yongsan	1.96
Namyeong	남영동	南營洞	Seoul	Yongsan	1.19
Cheongpa	청파동	靑坡洞	Seoul	Yongsan	0.91
Wonhyoro Je 1	원효로제1동	元曉路第1洞	Seoul	Yongsan	0.59
Wonhyoro Je 2	원효로제2동	元曉路第2洞	Seoul	Yongsan	0.71
Hyochang	효창동	孝昌洞	Seoul	Yongsan	0.44
Yongmun	용문동	龍門洞	Seoul	Yongsan	0.28
Hangangno	한강로동	漢江路洞	Seoul	Yongsan	2.90
Ichon Je 1	이촌제1동	二村第1洞	Seoul	Yongsan	2.86
Ichon Je 2	이촌제2동	二村第2洞	Seoul	Yongsan	1.22
Itaewon Je 1	이태원제1동	梨泰院第1洞	Seoul	Yongsan	0.57
Itaewon Je 2	이태원제2동	梨泰院第2洞	Seoul	Yongsan	0.86
Hannam	한남동	漢南洞	Seoul	Yongsan	3.01
Seobinggo	서빙고동	西氷庫洞	Seoul	Yongsan	2.80
Bogwang	보광동	普光洞	Seoul	Yongsan	0.71
Nokbeon	녹번동	碌磻洞	Seoul	Eunpyeong	1.79
Bulgwang Je 1	불광제1동	佛光第1洞	Seoul	Eunpyeong	3.13
Bulgwang Je 2	불광제2동	佛光第2洞	Seoul	Eunpyeong	1.38
Galhyeon Je 1	갈현제1동	葛峴第1洞	Seoul	Eunpyeong	0.97
Galhyeon Je 2	갈현제2동	葛峴第2洞	Seoul	Eunpyeong	0.96
Gusan	구산동	龜山洞	Seoul	Eunpyeong	1.38
Daejo	대조동	大棗洞	Seoul	Eunpyeong	0.85
Eungam Je 1	응암제1동	鷹岩第1洞	Seoul	Eunpyeong	1.20
Eungam Je 2	응암제2동	鷹岩第2洞	Seoul	Eunpyeong	0.78
Eungam Je 3	응암제3동	鷹岩第3洞	Seoul	Eunpyeong	0.63
Yeokchon	역촌동	驛村洞	Seoul	Eunpyeong	1.16
Sinsa Je 1	신사제1동	新寺第1洞	Seoul	Eunpyeong	0.84
Sinsa Je 2	신사제2동	新寺第2洞	Seoul	Eunpyeong	1.00
Jeungsan	증산동	繒山洞	Seoul	Eunpyeong	0.81
Susaek	수색동	水色洞	Seoul	Eunpyeong	1.29
Jingwan	진관동	津寬洞	Seoul	Eunpyeong	11.52
Cheongun Hyoja	청운효자동	淸雲孝子洞	Seoul	Jongno	2.57
Sajik	사직동	社稷洞	Seoul	Jongno	1.23
Samcheong	삼청동	三淸洞	Seoul	Jongno	1.49
Buam	부암동	付岩洞	Seoul	Jongno	2.27
Pyeongchang	평창동	平倉洞	Seoul	Jongno	8.87
Muak	무악동	毋岳洞	Seoul	Jongno	0.36
Gyonam	교남동	橋南洞	Seoul	Jongno	0.35
Gahoe	가회동	嘉會洞	Seoul	Jongno	0.54
Jongno 1·2·3·4 Ga	종로1·2·3·4가동	鍾路1·2·3·4街洞	Seoul	Jongno	2.36
Jongno 5·6 Ga	종로5·6가동	鍾路5·6街洞	Seoul	Jongno	0.60
Ihwa	이화동	梨花洞	Seoul	Jongno	0.78
Hyehwa	혜화동	惠化洞	Seoul	Jongno	1.11
Changsin Je 1	창신제1동	昌信第1洞	Seoul	Jongno	0.31
Changsin Je 2	창신제2동	昌信第2洞	Seoul	Jongno	0.26
Changsin Je 3	창신제3동	昌信第3洞	Seoul	Jongno	0.23
Sungin Je 1	숭인제1동	崇仁第1洞	Seoul	Jongno	0.23
Sungin Je 2	숭인제2동	崇仁第2洞	Seoul	Jongno	0.35
Sogong	소공동	小公洞	Seoul	Jung	0.95
Hoehyeon	회현동	會賢洞	Seoul	Jung	0.84
Myeong	명동	明洞	Seoul	Jung	0.99
Pil	필동	筆洞	Seoul	Jung	1.14
Jangchung	장충동	奬忠洞	Seoul	Jung	1.36
Gwanghui	광희동	光熙洞	Seoul	Jung	0.74
Euljiro	을지로동	乙支路洞	Seoul	Jung	0.60
Sindang	신당동	新堂洞	Seoul	Jung	0.55
Dasan	다산동	茶山洞	Seoul	Jung	0.51
Yaksu	약수동	藥水洞	Seoul	Jung	0.48
Cheonggu	청구동	靑丘洞	Seoul	Jung	0.34
Sindang	신당5동	新堂5洞	Seoul	Jung	0.39
Donghwa	동화동	東化洞	Seoul	Jung	0.26
Hwanghak	황학동	黃鶴洞	Seoul	Jung	0.33
Jungnim	중림동	中林洞	Seoul	Jung	0.48
Myeonmok Bon	면목본동	面牧本洞	Seoul	Jungnang	1.01
Myeonmok Je 2	면목제2동	面牧第2洞	Seoul	Jungnang	0.73
Myeonmok Je 3·8	면목제3·8동	面牧第3·8洞	Seoul	Jungnang	1.67
Myeonmok Je 4	면목제4동	面牧第4洞	Seoul	Jungnang	1.11
Myeonmok Je 5	면목제5동	面牧第5洞	Seoul	Jungnang	0.64
Myeonmok Je 6	면목제7동	面牧第7洞	Seoul	Jungnang	0.87
Sangbong Je 1	상봉제1동	上鳳第1洞	Seoul	Jungnang	0.85
Sangbong Je 2	상봉제2동	上鳳第2洞	Seoul	Jungnang	0.68
Junghwa Je 1	중화제1동	中和第1洞	Seoul	Jungnang	0.68
Junghwa Je 2	중화제2동	中和第2洞	Seoul	Jungnang	0.98
Muk Je 1	묵제1동	墨第1洞	Seoul	Jungnang	1.20
Muk Je 2	묵제2동	墨第2洞	Seoul	Jungnang	0.70
Mangu Bon	망우본동	忘憂本洞	Seoul	Jungnang	2.88
Mangu Je 3	망우제3동	忘憂第3洞	Seoul	Jungnang	0.99
Sinnae 1	신내1동	新內1洞	Seoul	Jungnang	2.53
Sinnae 2	신내2동	新內2洞	Seoul	Jungnang	0.99
Daejeo 1	대저1동	大渚1洞	Busan	Gangseo	17.80
Daejeo 2	대저2동	大渚2洞	Busan	Gangseo	29.25
Gangdong	강동동	江東洞	Busan	Gangseo	18.49
Myeongji	명지동	鳴旨洞	Busan	Gangseo	15.67
Garak	가락동	駕洛洞	Busan	Gangseo	19.05
Noksan	녹산동	菉山洞	Busan	Gangseo	56.82
Gadeokdo	가덕도동	加德島洞	Busan	Gangseo	24.50
Seo Je 1	서제1동	書第1洞	Busan	Geumjeong	0.36
Seo Je 2	서제2동	書第2洞	Busan	Geumjeong	0.40
Seo Je 3	서제3동	書第3洞	Busan	Geumjeong	0.92
Geumsahoedong	금사동	錦絲洞	Busan	Geumjeong	5.52
Bugok Je 1	부곡제1동	釜谷第1洞	Busan	Geumjeong	0.71
Bugok Je 2	부곡제2동	釜谷第2洞	Busan	Geumjeong	1.20
Bugok Je 3	부곡제3동	釜谷第3洞	Busan	Geumjeong	8.16
Bugok Je 4	부곡제4동	釜谷第4洞	Busan	Geumjeong	0.67
Jangjeon Je 1	장전제1동	長箭第1洞	Busan	Geumjeong	3.27
Jangjeon Je 2	장전제2동	長箭第2洞	Busan	Geumjeong	2.06
Jangjeon Je 3	장전제3동	長箭第3洞	Busan	Geumjeong	0.68
Seondugu	선두구동	仙杜邱洞	Busan	Geumjeong	12.05
Cheongnyeongnopo	청룡노포동	靑龍老圃洞	Busan	Geumjeong	10.91
Namsan	남산동	南山洞	Busan	Geumjeong	3.64
Guseo Je 1	구서제1동	久瑞第1洞	Busan	Geumjeong	3.05
Guseo Je 2	구서제2동	久瑞第2洞	Busan	Geumjeong	3.19
Geumseong	금성동	金城洞	Busan	Geumjeong	8.41
Daeyeon Je 1	대연제1동	大淵第1洞	Busan	Nam	0.97
Daeyeon Je 3	대연제3동	大淵第3洞	Busan	Nam	3.84
Daeyeon Je 4	대연제4동	大淵第4洞	Busan	Nam	1.00
Daeyeon Je 5	대연제5동	大淵第5洞	Busan	Nam	1.11
Daeyeon Je 6	대연제6동	大淵第6洞	Busan	Nam	1.19
Yongho Je 1	용호제1동	龍湖第1洞	Busan	Nam	1.60
Yongho Je 2	용호제2동	龍湖第2洞	Busan	Nam	2.03
Yongho Je 3	용호제3동	龍湖第3洞	Busan	Nam	1.96
Yongho Je 4	용호제4동	龍湖第4洞	Busan	Nam	1.52
Yongdang	용당동	龍塘洞	Busan	Nam	3.63
Gamman Je 1	감만제1동	戡蠻第1洞	Busan	Nam	2.66
Gamman Je 2	감만제2동	戡蠻第2洞	Busan	Nam	0.89
Uam	우암동	牛岩洞	Busan	Nam	1.44
Munhyeon Je 1	문현제1동	門峴第1洞	Busan	Nam	0.83
Munhyeon Je 2	문현제2동	門峴第2洞	Busan	Nam	0.62
Munhyeon Je 3	문현제3동	門峴第3洞	Busan	Nam	0.83
Munhyeon Je 4	문현제4동	門峴第4洞	Busan	Nam	0.69
Choryang Je 1	초량제1동	草梁第1洞	Busan	Dong	0.26
Choryang Je 2	초량제2동	草梁第2洞	Busan	Dong	0.39
Choryang Je 3	초량제3동	草梁第3洞	Busan	Dong	1.13
Choryang Je 6	초량제6동	草梁第6洞	Busan	Dong	1.34
Sujeong Je 1	수정제1동	水晶第1洞	Busan	Dong	0.23
Sujeong Je 2	수정제2동	水晶第2洞	Busan	Dong	1.12
Sujeong Je 4	수정제4동	水晶第4洞	Busan	Dong	0.92
Sujeong Je 5	수정제5동	水晶第5洞	Busan	Dong	0.34
Jwacheon	좌천동	佐川洞	Busan	Dong	0.46
Beomil Je 1	범일제1동	凡一第1洞	Busan	Dong	0.39
Beomil Je 2	범일제2동	凡一第2洞	Busan	Dong	0.83
Beomil Je 4	범일제4동	凡一第4洞	Busan	Dong	0.59
Beomil Je 5	범일제5동	凡一第5洞	Busan	Dong	1.73
Sumin	수민동	壽民洞	Busan	Dongnae	1.21
Boksan	복산동	福山洞	Busan	Dongnae	0.78
Myeongnyun	명륜동	明倫洞	Busan	Dongnae	1.35
Oncheon Je 1	온천제1동	溫泉第1洞	Busan	Dongnae	2.12
Oncheon Je 2	온천제2동	溫泉第2洞	Busan	Dongnae	2.33
Oncheon Je 3	온천제3동	溫泉第3洞	Busan	Dongnae	1.77
Sajik Je 1	사직제1동	社稷第1洞	Busan	Dongnae	0.32
Sajik Je 2	사직제2동	社稷第2洞	Busan	Dongnae	1.86
Sajik Je 3	사직제3동	社稷第3洞	Busan	Dongnae	0.80
Allak Je 1	안락제1동	安樂第1洞	Busan	Dongnae	0.97
Allak Je 2	안락제2동	安樂第2洞	Busan	Dongnae	1.34
Myeongjang Je 1	명장제1동	鳴藏第1洞	Busan	Dongnae	0.90
Myeongjang Je 2	명장제2동	鳴藏第2洞	Busan	Dongnae	0.88
Bujeon Je 1	부전제1동	釜田第1洞	Busan	Busanjin	?.??
Bujeon Je 2	부전제2동	釜田第2洞	Busan	Busanjin	0.71
Yeonji	연지동	蓮池洞	Busan	Busanjin	0.99
Choeup	초읍동	草邑洞	Busan	Busanjin	5.91
Yangjeong Je 1	양정제1동	楊亭第1洞	Busan	Busanjin	1.19
Yangjeong Je 2	양정제2동	楊亭第2洞	Busan	Busanjin	0.89
Jeonpo Je 1	전포제1동	田浦第1洞	Busan	Busanjin	?.??
Jeonpo Je 2	전포제2동	田浦第2洞	Busan	Busanjin	1.14
Buam Je 1	부암제1동	釜岩第1洞	Busan	Busanjin	0.80
Buam Je 3	부암제3동	釜岩第3洞	Busan	Busanjin	1.83
Danggam Je 1	당감제1동	堂甘第1洞	Busan	Busanjin	2.44
Danggam Je 2	당감제2동	堂甘第2洞	Busan	Busanjin	0.86
Danggam Je 4	당감제4동	堂甘第4洞	Busan	Busanjin	0.87
Gaya Je 1	가야제1동	伽倻第1洞	Busan	Busanjin	2.02
Gaya Je 2	가야제2동	伽倻第2洞	Busan	Busanjin	1.17
Gaegeum Je 1	개금제1동	開琴第1洞	Busan	Busanjin	0.58
Gaegeum Je 2	개금제2동	開琴第2洞	Busan	Busanjin	0.92
Gaegeum Je 3	개금제3동	開琴第3洞	Busan	Busanjin	2.03
Beomcheon Je 1	범천제1동	凡川第1洞	Busan	Busanjin	0.55
Beomcheon Je 2	범천제2동	凡川第2洞	Busan	Busanjin	0.97
Beomcheon Je 4	범천제4동	凡川第4洞	Busan	Busanjin	0.80
Gupo Je 1	구포제1동	龜浦第1洞	Busan	Buk	1.14
Gupo Je 2	구포제2동	龜浦第2洞	Busan	Buk	2.91
Gupo Je 3	구포제3동	龜浦第3洞	Busan	Buk	1.47
Geumgok	금곡동	金谷洞	Busan	Buk	8.12
Hwamyeong Je 1	화명제1동	華明第1洞	Busan	Buk	4.73
Hwamyeong Je 2	화명제2동	華明第2洞	Busan	Buk	5.03
Hwamyeong Je 3	화명제3동	華明第3洞	Busan	Buk	2.48
Deokcheon Je 1	덕천제1동	德川第1洞	Busan	Buk	1.44
Deokcheon Je 2	덕천제2동	德川第2洞	Busan	Buk	2.32
Deokcheon Je 3	덕천제3동	德川第3洞	Busan	Buk	0.95
Mandeok Je 1	만덕제1동	萬德第1洞	Busan	Buk	4.76
Mandeok Je 2	만덕제2동	萬德第2洞	Busan	Buk	2.25
Mandeok Je 3	만덕제3동	萬德第3洞	Busan	Buk	1.76
Samnak	삼락동	三樂洞	Busan	Sasang	6.68
Mora Je 1	모라제1동	毛羅第1洞	Busan	Sasang	1.67
Mora Je 3	모라제3동	毛羅第3洞	Busan	Sasang	3.34
Deokpo Je 1	덕포제1동	德浦第1洞	Busan	Sasang	0.56
Deokpo Je 2	덕포제2동	德浦第2洞	Busan	Sasang	1.60
Gwaebeop	괘법동	掛法洞	Busan	Sasang	3.45
Gamjeon	감전동	甘田洞	Busan	Sasang	3.48
Jurye Je 1	주례제1동	周禮第1洞	Busan	Sasang	1.53
Jurye Je 2	주례제2동	周禮第2洞	Busan	Sasang	2.37
Jurye Je 3	주례제3동	周禮第3洞	Busan	Sasang	0.86
Hakjang	학장동	鶴章洞	Busan	Sasang	5.48
eomgung	엄궁동	嚴弓洞	Busan	Sasang	5.04
Goejeong Je 1	괴정제1동	槐亭第1洞	Busan	Saha	1.09
Goejeong Je 2	괴정제2동	槐亭第2洞	Busan	Saha	1.03
Goejeong Je 3	괴정제3동	槐亭第3洞	Busan	Saha	1.90
Goejeong Je 4	괴정제4동	槐亭第4洞	Busan	Saha	0.87
Dangni	당리동	堂里洞	Busan	Saha	3.87
Hadan Je 1	하단제1동	下端第1洞	Busan	Saha	6.50
Hadan Je 2	하단제2동	下端第2洞	Busan	Saha	3.08
Sinpyeong Je 1	신평제1동	新平第1洞	Busan	Saha	1.65
Sinpyeong Je 2	신평제2동	新平第2洞	Busan	Saha	2.65
Jangnim Je 1	장림제1동	長林第1洞	Busan	Saha	2.53
Jangnim Je 2	장림제2동	長林第2洞	Busan	Saha	2.30
Dadae Je 1	다대제1동	多大第1洞	Busan	Saha	5.06
Dadae Je 2	다대제2동	多大第2洞	Busan	Saha	2.69
Gupyeong	구평동	舊平洞	Busan	Saha	3.48
Gamcheon Je 1	감천제1동	甘川第1洞	Busan	Saha	2.38
Gamcheon Je 2	감천제2동	甘川第2洞	Busan	Saha	0.62
Dongdaesin Je 1	동대신제1동	東大新第1洞	Busan	Seo	0.23
Dongdaesin Je 2	동대신제2동	東大新第2洞	Busan	Seo	0.44
Dongdaesin Je 3	동대신제3동	東大新第3洞	Busan	Seo	1.46
Seodaesin Je 1	서대신제1동	西大新第1洞	Busan	Seo	0.63
Seodaesin Je 3	서대신제3동	西大新第3洞	Busan	Seo	1.40
Seodaesin Je 4	서대신제4동	西大新第4洞	Busan	Seo	3.12
Bumin	부민동	富民洞	Busan	Seo	0.41
Ami	아미동	峨嵋洞	Busan	Seo	0.71
Chojang	초장동	草場洞	Busan	Seo	0.44
Chungmu	충무동	忠武洞	Busan	Seo	0.37
Nambumin Je 1	남부민제1동	南富民第1洞	Busan	Seo	0.37
Nambumin Je 2	남부민제2동	南富民第2洞	Busan	Seo	0.71
Amnam	암남동	岩南洞	Busan	Seo	3.59
Namcheon Je 1	남천제1동	南川第1洞	Busan	Suyeong	0.99
Namcheon Je 2	남천제2동	南川第2洞	Busan	Suyeong	0.66
Suyeong	수영동	水營洞	Busan	Suyeong	0.72
Mangmi Je 1	망미제1동	望美第1洞	Busan	Suyeong	1.82
Mangmi Je 2	망미제2동	望美第2洞	Busan	Suyeong	0.81
Gwangan Je 1	광안제1동	廣安第1洞	Busan	Suyeong	1.21
Gwangan Je 2	광안제2동	廣安第2洞	Busan	Suyeong	0.45
Gwangan Je 3	광안제3동	廣安第3洞	Busan	Suyeong	1.18
Gwangan Je 4	광안제4동	廣安第4洞	Busan	Suyeong	0.84
Millak	민락동	民樂洞	Busan	Suyeong	1.52
Geoje Je 1	거제제1동	巨堤第1洞	Busan	Yeonje	0.89
Geoje Je 2	거제제2동	巨堤第2洞	Busan	Yeonje	1.83
Geoje Je 3	거제제3동	巨堤第3洞	Busan	Yeonje	0.62
Geoje Je 4	거제제4동	巨堤第4洞	Busan	Yeonje	0.86
Yeonsan Je 1	연산제1동	蓮山第1洞	Busan	Yeonje	0.85
Yeonsan Je 2	연산제2동	蓮山第2洞	Busan	Yeonje	1.51
Yeonsan Je 3	연산제3동	蓮山第3洞	Busan	Yeonje	0.59
Yeonsan Je 4	연산제4동	蓮山第4洞	Busan	Yeonje	0.92
Yeonsan Je 5	연산제5동	蓮山第5洞	Busan	Yeonje	0.52
Yeonsan Je 6	연산제6동	蓮山第6洞	Busan	Yeonje	1.16
Yeonsan Je 8	연산제8동	蓮山第8洞	Busan	Yeonje	0.70
Yeonsan Je 9	연산제9동	蓮山第9洞	Busan	Yeonje	1.63
Namhang	남항동	南港洞	Busan	Yeongdo	0.74
Yeongseon Je 1	영선제1동	瀛仙第1洞	Busan	Yeongdo	0.17
Yeongseon Je 2	영선제2동	瀛仙第2洞	Busan	Yeongdo	0.63
Sinseon	신선동	新仙洞	Busan	Yeongdo	1.11
Bongnae Je 1	봉래제1동	蓬萊第1洞	Busan	Yeongdo	0.29
Bongnae Je 2	봉래제2동	蓬萊第2洞	Busan	Yeongdo	0.64
Cheonghak Je 1	청학제1동	靑鶴第1洞	Busan	Yeongdo	0.90
Cheonghak Je 2	청학제2동	靑鶴第2洞	Busan	Yeongdo	1.67
Dongsam Je 1	동삼제1동	東三第1洞	Busan	Yeongdo	3.86
Dongsam Je 2	동삼제2동	東三第2洞	Busan	Yeongdo	3.31
Dongsam Je 3	동삼제3동	東三第3洞	Busan	Yeongdo	0.81
Jungang	중앙동	中央洞	Busan	Jung	0.60
Donggwang	동광동	東光洞	Busan	Jung	0.17
Daecheong	대청동	大廳洞	Busan	Jung	0.35
Bosu	보수동	寶水洞	Busan	Jung	0.42
Bupyeong	부평동	富平洞	Busan	Jung	0.21
Gwangbok	광복동	光復洞	Busan	Jung	0.21
Nampo	남포동	南浦洞	Busan	Jung	0.23
Yeongju Je 1	영주제1동	瀛州第1洞	Busan	Jung	0.29
Yeongju Je 2	영주제2동	瀛州第2洞	Busan	Jung	0.34
U Je 1	우제1동	佑第1洞	Busan	Haeundae	7.59
U Je 2	우제2동	佑第2洞	Busan	Haeundae	3.41
Jung Je 1	중제1동	中第1洞	Busan	Haeundae	1.06
Jung Je 2	중제2동	中第2洞	Busan	Haeundae	1.84
Jwa Je 1	좌제1동	佐第1洞	Busan	Haeundae	0.73
Jwa Je 2	좌제2동	佐第2洞	Busan	Haeundae	1.44
Jwa Je 3	좌제3동	佐第3洞	Busan	Haeundae	0.79
Jwa Je 4	좌제4동	佐第4洞	Busan	Haeundae	6.35
Songjeong	송정동	松亭洞	Busan	Haeundae	4.16
Banyeo Je 1	반여제1동	盤如第1洞	Busan	Haeundae	5.30
Banyeo Je 2	반여제2동	盤如第2洞	Busan	Haeundae	1.03
Banyeo Je 3	반여제3동	盤如第3洞	Busan	Haeundae	1.01
Banyeo Je 4	반여제4동	盤如第4洞	Busan	Haeundae	1.24
Bansong Je	반송제1동	盤松第1洞	Busan	Haeundae	5.45
Bansong Je 2	반송제2동	盤松第2洞	Busan	Haeundae	4.59
Bansong Je 3	반송제3동	盤松第3洞	Busan	Haeundae	1.31
Jaesong Je 1	재송제1동	栽松第1洞	Busan	Haeundae	2.37
Jaesong Je 2	재송제2동	栽松第2洞	Busan	Haeundae	1.79
Icheon	이천동	梨川洞	Daegu	Nam	1.09
Bongdeok 1	봉덕1동	鳳德1洞	Daegu	Nam	0.49
Bongdeok 2	봉덕2동	鳳德2洞	Daegu	Nam	3.07
Bongdeok 3	봉덕3동	鳳德3洞	Daegu	Nam	2.69
Daemyeong 1	대명1동	大明1洞	Daegu	Nam	0.45
Daemyeong 2	대명2동	大明2洞	Daegu	Nam	0.83
Daemyeong 3	대명3동	大明3洞	Daegu	Nam	0.94
Daemyeong 4	대명4동	大明4洞	Daegu	Nam	0.71
Daemyeong 5	대명5동	大明5洞	Daegu	Nam	0.92
Daemyeong 6	대명6동	大明6洞	Daegu	Nam	1.50
Daemyeong 9	대명9동	大明9洞	Daegu	Nam	3.38
Daemyeong 10	대명10동	大明10洞	Daegu	Nam	0.50
Daemyeong 11	대명11동	大明11洞	Daegu	Nam	0.87
Seongdang-dong	성당동	聖堂洞	Daegu	Dalseo	1.99
Duryu 1·2	두류1·2동	頭流1·2洞	Daegu	Dalseo	1.33
Duryu 3	두류3동	頭流3洞	Daegu	Dalseo	1.11
Bolli	본리동	本里洞	Daegu	Dalseo	1.09
Gamsam	감삼동	甘三洞	Daegu	Dalseo	1.18
Jukjeon	죽전동	竹田洞	Daegu	Dalseo	0.74
Janggi	장기동	長基洞	Daegu	Dalseo	3.11
Yongsan 1	용산1동	龍山1洞	Daegu	Dalseo	1.22
Yongsan 2	용산2동	龍山2洞	Daegu	Dalseo	1.33
Igok 1	이곡1동	梨谷1洞	Daegu	Dalseo	1.82
Igok 2	이곡2동	梨谷2洞	Daegu	Dalseo	2.04
Sindang	신당동	新塘洞	Daegu	Dalseo	9.38
Weolseong 1	월성1동	月城1洞	Daegu	Dalseo	2.59
Weolseong 2	월성2동	月城2洞	Daegu	Dalseo	6.30
Jincheon	진천동	辰泉洞	Daegu	Dalseo	5.97
Sangin 1	상인1동	上仁1洞	Daegu	Dalseo	1.39
Sangin 2	상인2동	上仁2洞	Daegu	Dalseo	0.90
Sangin 3	상인3동	上仁3洞	Daegu	Dalseo	3.68
Doweon	도원동	桃源洞	Daegu	Dalseo	10.64
Songhyeon 1	송현1동	松峴1洞	Daegu	Dalseo	2.46
Songhyeon 2	송현2동	松峴2洞	Daegu	Dalseo	0.97
Bon	본동	本洞	Daegu	Dalseo	1.10
Sinam 1	신암1동	新岩1洞	Daegu	Dong	0.61
Sinam 2	신암2동	新岩2洞	Daegu	Dong	0.38
Sinam 3	신암3동	新岩3洞	Daegu	Dong	0.61
Sinam 4	신암4동	新岩4洞	Daegu	Dong	1.18
Sinam 5	신암5동	新岩5洞	Daegu	Dong	0.57
Sincheon 1·2	신천1·2동	新川1·2洞	Daegu	Dong	0.47
Sincheon 3	신천3동	新川3洞	Daegu	Dong	0.70
Sincheon 4	신천4동	新川4洞	Daegu	Dong	0.78
Hyomok 1	효목1동	孝睦1洞	Daegu	Dong	1.38
Hyomok 2	효목2동	孝睦2洞	Daegu	Dong	0.72
Dopyeong	도평동	道坪洞	Daegu	Dong	19.23
Bullo·Bongmu	불로·봉무동	不老·鳳舞洞	Daegu	Dong	7.98
Jijeo	지저동	枝底洞	Daegu	Dong	1.94
Dongchon	동촌동	東村洞	Daegu	Dong	5.34
Bangchon	방촌동	芳村洞	Daegu	Dong	1.24
Haean	해안동	解顔洞	Daegu	Dong	13.29
Ansim 1	안심1동	安心1洞	Daegu	Dong	3.34
Ansim 2	안심2동	安心2洞	Daegu	Dong	13.54
Ansim 3·4	안심3·4동	安心3·4洞	Daegu	Dong	25.22
Gongsan	공산동	公山洞	Daegu	Dong	83.70
Goseong	고성동	古城洞	Daegu	Buk	0.53
Chilseong	칠성동	七星洞	Daegu	Buk	1.36
Chimsan 1	침산1동	砧山1洞	Daegu	Buk	1.21
Chimsan 2	침산2동	砧山2洞	Daegu	Buk	0.99
Chimsan 3	침산3동	砧山3洞	Daegu	Buk	1.07
Nowon	노원동	魯院洞	Daegu	Buk	3.09
Sangyeok 1	산격1동	山格1洞	Daegu	Buk	0.91
Sangyeok 2	산격2동	山格2洞	Daegu	Buk	2.29
Sangyeok 3	산격3동	山格3洞	Daegu	Buk	0.80
Sangyeok 4	산격4동	山格4洞	Daegu	Buk	0.74
Bokhyeon 1	복현1동	伏賢1洞	Daegu	Buk	0.39
Bokhyeon 2	복현2동	伏賢2洞	Daegu	Buk	1.87
Daehyeon	대현동	大賢洞	Daegu	Buk	1.22
Geomdan	검단동	檢丹洞	Daegu	Buk	3.91
Mutaejoya	무태조야동	無怠助也洞	Daegu	Buk	23.24
Gwanmun	관문동	關門洞	Daegu	Buk	14.64
Taejeon 1	태전1동	太田1洞	Daegu	Buk	2.70
Taejeon 2	태전2동	太田2洞	Daegu	Buk	1.71
Guam	구암동	鳩岩洞	Daegu	Buk	4.40
Gwaneum	관음동	觀音洞	Daegu	Buk	2.99
Eupnae	읍내동	邑內洞	Daegu	Buk	5.71
Dongcheon	동천동	東川洞	Daegu	Buk	1.12
Gugu	국우동	國優洞	Daegu	Buk	17.19
Naedang 1	내당1동	內唐1洞	Daegu	Seo	0.47
Naedang 2·3	내당2·3동	內唐2·3洞	Daegu	Seo	0.65
Naedang 4	내당4동	內唐4洞	Daegu	Seo	0.76
Bisan 1	비산1동	飛山1洞	Daegu	Seo	0.64
Bisan 2·3	비산2·3동	飛山2·3洞	Daegu	Seo	0.49
Bisan 4	비산4동	飛山4洞	Daegu	Seo	0.39
Bisan 5	비산5동	飛山5洞	Daegu	Seo	0.28
Bisan 6	비산6동	飛山6洞	Daegu	Seo	0.27
Bisan 7	비산7동	飛山7洞	Daegu	Seo	2.74
Pyeongli 1	평리1동	坪里1洞	Daegu	Seo	0.37
Pyeongli 2	평리2동	坪里2洞	Daegu	Seo	0.23
Pyeongli 3	평리3동	坪里3洞	Daegu	Seo	0.65
Pyeongli 4	평리4동	坪里4洞	Daegu	Seo	0.71
Pyeongli 5	평리5동	坪里5洞	Daegu	Seo	0.61
Pyeongli 6	평리6동	坪里6洞	Daegu	Seo	0.91
Sangjungi	상중이동	上中梨洞	Daegu	Seo	6.69
Wondae	원대동	院垈洞	Daegu	Seo	0.62
Beomeo 1	범어1동	泛漁1洞	Daegu	Suseong	1.09
Beomeo 2	범어2동	泛漁2洞	Daegu	Suseong	1.13
Beomeo 3	범어3동	泛漁3洞	Daegu	Suseong	0.57
Beomeo 4	범어4동	泛漁4洞	Daegu	Suseong	1.08
Manchon 1	만촌1동	晩村1洞	Daegu	Suseong	2.88
Manchon 2	만촌2동	晩村2洞	Daegu	Suseong	1.62
Manchon 3	만촌3동	晩村3洞	Daegu	Suseong	1.78
Suseong 1 Ga	수성1가동	壽城1街洞	Daegu	Suseong	0.58
Suseong 2·3 Ga	수성2·3가동	壽城2·3街洞	Daegu	Suseong	0.65
Suseong 4 Ga	수성4가동	壽城4街洞	Daegu	Suseong	0.63
Hwanggeum 1	황금1동	黃金1洞	Daegu	Suseong	2.69
Hwanggeum 2	황금2동	黃金2洞	Daegu	Suseong	1.16
Jung	중동	中洞	Daegu	Suseong	0.91
Sang	상동	上洞	Daegu	Suseong	1.33
Pa	파동	巴洞	Daegu	Suseong	5.82
Dusan	두산동	斗山洞	Daegu	Suseong	1.97
Jisan 1	지산1동	池山1洞	Daegu	Suseong	2.64
Jisan 2	지산2동	池山2洞	Daegu	Suseong	1.97
Beommul 1	범물1동	凡勿1洞	Daegu	Suseong	5.44
Beommul 2	범물2동	凡勿2洞	Daegu	Suseong	2.33
Gosan 1	고산1동	孤山1洞	Daegu	Suseong	8.79
Gosan 2	고산2동	孤山2洞	Daegu	Suseong	24.39
Gosan 3	고산3동	孤山3洞	Daegu	Suseong	5.01
Dongin	동인동	東仁洞	Daegu	Jung	0.99
Samdeok	삼덕동	三德洞	Daegu	Jung	0.64
Seongnae 1	성내1동	城內1洞	Daegu	Jung	0.90
Seongnae 2	성내2동	城內2洞	Daegu	Jung	0.76
Seongnae 3	성내3동	城內3洞	Daegu	Jung	0.79
Daesin	대신동	大新洞	Daegu	Jung	0.52
Namsan 1	남산1동	南山1洞	Daegu	Jung	0.39
Namsan 2	남산2동	南山2洞	Daegu	Jung	0.38
Namsan 3	남산3동	南山3洞	Daegu	Jung	0.40
Namsan 4	남산4동	南山4洞	Daegu	Jung	0.45
Daebong 1	대봉1동	大鳳1洞	Daegu	Jung	0.59
Daebong 2	대봉2동	大鳳2洞	Daegu	Jung	0.25
Hyoseong 1	효성1동	曉星1洞	Incheon	Gyeyang	2.30
Hyoseong 2	효성2동	曉星2洞	Incheon	Gyeyang	2.69
Gyesan 1	계산1동	桂山1洞	Incheon	Gyeyang	1.57
Gyesan 2	계산2동	桂山2洞	Incheon	Gyeyang	1.69
Gyesan 3	계산3동	桂山3洞	Incheon	Gyeyang	0.46
Gyesan 4	계산4동	桂山4洞	Incheon	Gyeyang	0.83
Jakjeon 1	작전1동	鵲田1洞	Incheon	Gyeyang	0.82
Jakjeon 2	작전2동	鵲田2洞	Incheon	Gyeyang	0.98
Jakjeonseoun	작전서운동	鵲田瑞雲洞	Incheon	Gyeyang	3.79
Gyeyang 1	계양1동	桂陽1洞	Incheon	Gyeyang	25.93
Gyeyang 2	계양2동	桂陽2洞	Incheon	Gyeyang	4.52
Gyeyang 3	계양3동	桂陽3洞	Incheon	Gyeyang	?.??
Sungui1· 3	숭의1·3동	崇義1·3洞	Incheon	Nam	0.86
Sungui 2	숭의2동	崇義2洞	Incheon	Nam	0.51
Sungui 4	숭의4동	崇義4洞	Incheon	Nam	0.74
Yonghyeon 1·4	용현1·4동	龍峴1·4洞	Incheon	Nam	1.30
Yonghyeon 2	용현2동	龍峴2洞	Incheon	Nam	0.55
Yonghyeon 3	용현3동	龍峴3洞	Incheon	Nam	0.48
Yonghyeon 5	용현5동	龍峴5洞	Incheon	Nam	1.89
Hagik 1	학익1동	鶴翼1洞	Incheon	Nam	5.07
Hagik 2	학익2동	鶴翼2洞	Incheon	Nam	0.80
Dohwa 1	도화1동	道禾1洞	Incheon	Nam	0.92
Dohwa 2·3	도화2·3동	道禾2·3洞	Incheon	Nam	2.92
Juan 1	주안1동	朱安1洞	Incheon	Nam	0.61
Juan 2	주안2동	朱安2洞	Incheon	Nam	0.99
Juan 3	주안3동	朱安3洞	Incheon	Nam	0.46
Juan 4	주안4동	朱安4洞	Incheon	Nam	0.96
Juan 5	주안5동	朱安5洞	Incheon	Nam	1.18
Juan 6	주안6동	朱安6洞	Incheon	Nam	0.62
Juan 7	주안7동	朱安7洞	Incheon	Nam	0.52
Juan 8	주안8동	朱安8洞	Incheon	Nam	0.84
Gwangyo	관교동	官校洞	Incheon	Nam	0.90
Munhak	문학동	文鶴洞	Incheon	Nam	1.72
Guwol 1	구월1동	九月1洞	Incheon	Namdong	2.69
Guwol 2	구월2동	九月2洞	Incheon	Namdong	1.06
Guwol 3	구월3동	九月3洞	Incheon	Namdong	0.76
Guwol 4	구월4동	九月4洞	Incheon	Namdong	0.91
Ganseok 1	간석1동	間石1洞	Incheon	Namdong	0.87
Ganseok 2	간석2동	間石2洞	Incheon	Namdong	0.41
Ganseok 3	간석3동	間石3洞	Incheon	Namdong	1.84
Ganseok 4	간석4동	間石4洞	Incheon	Namdong	1.07
Nonhyeon 1	논현1동	論峴1洞	Incheon	Namdong	4.51
Nonhyeon 2	논현2동	論峴2洞	Incheon	Namdong	3.31
Nonhyeongojan	논현고잔동	論峴古棧洞	Incheon	Namdong	10.50
Mansu 1	만수1동	萬壽1洞	Incheon	Namdong	0.69
Mansu 2	만수2동	萬壽2洞	Incheon	Namdong	1.34
Mansu 3	만수3동	萬壽3洞	Incheon	Namdong	0.93
Mansu 4	만수4동	萬壽4洞	Incheon	Namdong	0.89
Mansu 5	만수5동	萬壽5洞	Incheon	Namdong	0.54
Mansu 6	만수6동	萬壽6洞	Incheon	Namdong	1.73
Jangsuseochang	장수서창동	長壽西昌洞	Incheon	Namdong	13.20
Namchondorim	남촌도림동	南村桃林洞	Incheon	Namdong	9.76
Manseok	만석동	萬石洞	Incheon	Dong	1.15
Hwasu 1·Hwapyeong	화수1·화평동	花水1·花平洞	Incheon	Dong	0.30
Hwasu 2	화수2동	花水2洞	Incheon	Dong	0.61
Songhyeon 1·2	송현1·2동	松峴1·2洞	Incheon	Dong	0.34
Songhyeon 3	송현3동	松峴3洞	Incheon	Dong	2.21
Songnim 1	송림1동	松林1洞	Incheon	Dong	0.19
Songnim 2	송림2동	松林2洞	Incheon	Dong	0.20
Songnim 3·5	송림3·5동	松林3·5洞	Incheon	Dong	0.55
Songnim 4	송림4동	松林4洞	Incheon	Dong	0.79
Songnim 6	송림6동	松林6洞	Incheon	Dong	0.56
Geumchang	금창동	金昌洞	Incheon	Dong	0.29
Bupyeong 1	부평1동	富平1洞	Incheon	Bupyeong	1.10
Bupyeong 2	부평2동	富平2洞	Incheon	Bupyeong	2.28
Bupyeong 3	부평3동	富平3洞	Incheon	Bupyeong	1.00
Bupyeong 4	부평4동	富平4洞	Incheon	Bupyeong	1.04
Bupyeong 5	부평5동	富平5洞	Incheon	Bupyeong	0.83
Bupyeong 6	부평6동	富平6洞	Incheon	Bupyeong	0.76
Sangok 1	산곡1동	山谷1洞	Incheon	Bupyeong	2.07
Sangok 2	산곡2동	山谷2洞	Incheon	Bupyeong	0.92
Sangok 3	산곡3동	山谷3洞	Incheon	Bupyeong	1.43
Sangok 4	산곡4동	山谷4洞	Incheon	Bupyeong	0.76
Cheongcheon 1	청천1동	淸川1洞	Incheon	Bupyeong	2.16
Cheongcheon 2	청천2동	淸川2洞	Incheon	Bupyeong	2.78
Galsan 1	갈산1동	葛山1洞	Incheon	Bupyeong	1.07
Galsan 2	갈산2동	葛山2洞	Incheon	Bupyeong	0.66
Samsan 1	삼산1동	三山1洞	Incheon	Bupyeong	2.13
Samsan 2	삼산2동	三山2洞	Incheon	Bupyeong	1.26
Bugae 1	부개1동	富開1洞	Incheon	Bupyeong	0.95
Bugae 2	부개2동	富開2洞	Incheon	Bupyeong	0.75
Bugae 3	부개3동	富開3洞	Incheon	Bupyeong	0.86
Ilsin	일신동	日新洞	Incheon	Bupyeong	4.30
Sipjeong 1	십정1동	十井1洞	Incheon	Bupyeong	1.79
Sipjeong 2	십정2동	十井2洞	Incheon	Bupyeong	1.09
Geomamgyeongseo	검암경서동	黔岩景西洞	Incheon	Seo	15.23
Yeonhui	연희동	連喜洞	Incheon	Seo	11.90
Cheongna 1	청라1동	靑羅1洞	Incheon	Seo	2.37
Cheongna 2	청라2동	靑羅2洞	Incheon	Seo	15.4
Gajeong 1	가정1동	佳停1洞	Incheon	Seo	1.89
Gajeong 2	가정2동	佳停2洞	Incheon	Seo	1.50
Gajeong 3	가정3동	佳停3洞	Incheon	Seo	1.09
Sinhyeonwonchang	신현원창동	新峴元倉洞	Incheon	Seo	9.44
Seoknam 1	석남1동	石南1洞	Incheon	Seo	1.12
Seoknam 2	석남2동	石南2洞	Incheon	Seo	2.15
Seoknam 3	석남3동	石南3洞	Incheon	Seo	2.05
Gajwa 1	가좌1동	佳佐1洞	Incheon	Seo	4.04
Gajwa 2	가좌2동	佳佐2洞	Incheon	Seo	0.76
Gajwa 3	가좌3동	佳佐3洞	Incheon	Seo	2.15
Gajwa 4	가좌4동	佳佐4洞	Incheon	Seo	2.01
Geomdan 1	검단1동	黔丹1洞	Incheon	Seo	7.93
Geomdan 2	검단2동	黔丹2洞	Incheon	Seo	10.80
Geomdan 3	검단3동	黔丹3洞	Incheon	Seo	6.59
Geomdan 4	검단4동	黔丹4洞	Incheon	Seo	3.64
Geomdan 5	검단5동	黔丹5洞	Incheon	Seo	13.47
Ongnyeon 1	옥련1동	玉蓮1洞	Incheon	Yeonsu	2.15
Ongnyeon 2	옥련2동	玉蓮2洞	Incheon	Yeonsu	1.93
Seonhak	선학동	仙鶴洞	Incheon	Yeonsu	2.41
Yeonsu 1	연수1동	延壽1洞	Incheon	Yeonsu	1.52
Yeonsu 2	연수2동	延壽2洞	Incheon	Yeonsu	1.00
Yeonsu 3	연수3동	延壽3洞	Incheon	Yeonsu	1.00
Cheonghak	청학동	靑鶴洞	Incheon	Yeonsu	2.39
Dongchun 1	동춘1동	東春1洞	Incheon	Yeonsu	3.40
Dongchun 2	동춘2동	東春2洞	Incheon	Yeonsu	4.55
Dongchun 3	동춘3동	東春3洞	Incheon	Yeonsu	0.70
Songdo 1	송도1동	松島1洞	Incheon	Yeonsu	15.13
Songdo 2	송도2동	松島2洞	Incheon	Yeonsu	12.22
Yeonan	연안동	沿岸洞	Incheon	Jung	4.86
Sinpo	신포동	新浦洞	Incheon	Jung	1.82
Sinheung	신흥동	新興洞	Incheon	Jung	3.52
Dowon	도원동	桃源洞	Incheon	Jung	0.27
Yulmok	율목동	栗木洞	Incheon	Jung	0.18
Dongincheon	동인천동	東仁川洞	Incheon	Jung	0.64
Bukseong	북성동	北城洞	Incheon	Jung	3.02
Songwol	송월동	松月洞	Incheon	Jung	0.22
Yeongjong	영종동	永宗洞	Incheon	Jung	32.76
Unseo	운서동	雲西洞	Incheon	Jung	58.11
Yongyu	용유동	龍游洞	Incheon	Jung	24.90
Songjeong 1	송정1동	松汀1洞	Gwangju	Gwangsan	1.43
Songjeong 1	송정2동	松汀2洞	Gwangju	Gwangsan	1.14
Dosan	도산동	道山洞	Gwangju	Gwangsan	4.01
Sinheung	신흥동	新興洞	Gwangju	Gwangsan	5.51
Eoryong	어룡동	魚龍洞	Gwangju	Gwangsan	17.86
Usan	우산동	牛山洞	Gwangju	Gwangsan	4.55
Wolgok 1	월곡1동	月谷1洞	Gwangju	Gwangsan	0.86
Wolgok 2	월곡2동	月谷2洞	Gwangju	Gwangsan	1.12
Bia	비아동	飛鴉洞	Gwangju	Gwangsan	4.92
Cheomdan 1	첨단1동	尖端1洞	Gwangju	Gwangsan	2.22
Cheomdan 2	첨단2동	尖端2洞	Gwangju	Gwangsan	3.45
Singa	신가동	新佳洞	Gwangju	Gwangsan	1.58
Unnam	운남동	雲南洞	Gwangju	Gwangsan	2.84
Suwan	수완동	水莞洞	Gwangju	Gwangsan	4.62
Hanam	하남동	河南洞	Gwangju	Gwangsan	15.41
Imgok	임곡동	林谷洞	Gwangju	Gwangsan	29.82
Donggok	동곡동	東谷洞	Gwangju	Gwangsan	16.29
Pyeong	평동	平洞	Gwangju	Gwangsan	29.09
Samdo	삼도동	三道洞	Gwangju	Gwangsan	38.74
Bolnyang	본량동	本良洞	Gwangju	Gwangsan	33.48
Sinchang	신창동	新昌洞	Gwangju	Gwangsan	3.98
Yangnim	양림동	楊林洞	Gwangju	Nam	0.63
Bangnim 1	방림1동	芳林1洞	Gwangju	Nam	0.59
Bangnim 2	방림2동	芳林2洞	Gwangju	Nam	0.56
Bongseon 1	봉선1동	鳳仙1洞	Gwangju	Nam	0.83
Bongseon 2	봉선2동	鳳仙2洞	Gwangju	Nam	1.80
Sajik	사직동	社稷洞	Gwangju	Nam	0.61
Wolsan	월산동	月山洞	Gwangju	Nam	0.93
Wolsan 4	월산4동	月山4洞	Gwangju	Nam	0.57
Wolsan 5	월산5동	月山5洞	Gwangju	Nam	0.44
Baegun 1	백운1동	白雲1洞	Gwangju	Nam	0.49
Baegun 2	백운2동	白雲2洞	Gwangju	Nam	0.44
Juwol 1	주월1동	珠月1洞	Gwangju	Nam	1.27
Juwol 2	주월2동	珠月2洞	Gwangju	Nam	1.16
Hyodeok	효덕동	孝德洞	Gwangju	Nam	8.45
Songam	송암동	松岩洞	Gwangju	Nam	6.84
Daechon	대촌동	大村洞	Gwangju	Nam	35.41
Chungjang	충장동	忠壯洞	Gwangju	Dong	1.09
Dongmyeong	동명동	東明洞	Gwangju	Dong	0.43
Gyerim 1	계림1동	鷄林1洞	Gwangju	Dong	0.63
Gyerim 2	계림2동	鷄林2洞	Gwangju	Dong	0.55
Sansu 1	산수1동	山水1洞	Gwangju	Dong	0.73
Sansu 2	산수2동	山水2洞	Gwangju	Dong	0.74
Jisan 1	지산1동	芝山1洞	Gwangju	Dong	1.01
Jisan 2	지산2동	芝山2洞	Gwangju	Dong	1.60
Seonam	서남동	瑞南洞	Gwangju	Dong	1.41
hak	학동	鶴洞	Gwangju	Dong	1.23
Hagun	학운동	鶴雲洞	Gwangju	Dong	10.81
Jiwon 1	지원1동	池元1洞	Gwangju	Dong	1.37
Jiwon 2	지원2동	池元2洞	Gwangju	Dong	27.61
Jungheung 1	중흥1동	中興1洞	Gwangju	Buk	0.62
Jungheung 2	중흥2동	中興2洞	Gwangju	Buk	0.51
Jungheung 3	중흥3동	中興3洞	Gwangju	Buk	0.54
Jungang	중앙동	中央洞	Gwangju	Buk	0.67
Im	임동	林洞	Gwangju	Buk	1.22
Sinan	신안동	新安洞	Gwangju	Buk	1.24
Yongbong	용봉동	龍鳳洞	Gwangju	Buk	3.14
Unam 1	운암1동	雲岩1洞	Gwangju	Buk	1.17
Unam 2	운암2동	雲岩2洞	Gwangju	Buk	1.20
Unam 3	운암3동	雲岩3洞	Gwangju	Buk	1.28
Dongnim	동림동	東林洞	Gwangju	Buk	4.34
Usan	우산동	牛山洞	Gwangju	Buk	0.97
Punghyang	풍향동	豊鄕洞	Gwangju	Buk	0.78
Munhwa	문화동	文化洞	Gwangju	Buk	3.17
Munheung 1	문흥1동	文興1洞	Gwangju	Buk	2.14
Munheung 2	문흥2동	文興2洞	Gwangju	Buk	0.80
Duam 1	두암1동	斗岩1洞	Gwangju	Buk	0.85
Duam 2	두암2동	斗岩2洞	Gwangju	Buk	1.64
Duam 3	두암3동	斗岩3洞	Gwangju	Buk	1.10
Samgak	삼각동	三角洞	Gwangju	Buk	3.35
Ilgok	일곡동	日谷洞	Gwangju	Buk	0.75
Maegok	매곡동	梅谷洞	Gwangju	Buk	3.73
Ochi 1	오치1동	梧峙1洞	Gwangju	Buk	1.87
Ochi 2	오치2동	梧峙2洞	Gwangju	Buk	2.18
Seokgok	석곡동	石谷洞	Gwangju	Buk	48.42
Geonguk	건국동	建國洞	Gwangju	Buk	28.2
Yangsan	양산동	陽山洞	Gwangju	Buk	5.86
Yang	양동	良洞	Gwangju	Seo	0.54
Yang 3	양3동	良3洞	Gwangju	Seo	0.29
Nongseong 1	농성1동	農城1洞	Gwangju	Seo	0.76
Nongseong 2	농성2동	農城2洞	Gwangju	Seo	0.64
Gwangcheon	광천동	光川洞	Gwangju	Seo	1.18
Yudeok	유덕동	柳德洞	Gwangju	Seo	5.48
Chipyeong	치평동	治平洞	Gwangju	Seo	3.27
Sangmu 1	상무1동	尙武1洞	Gwangju	Seo	1.36
Sangmu 2	상무2동	尙武2洞	Gwangju	Seo	1.87
Hwajeong 1	화정1동	花亭1洞	Gwangju	Seo	1.20
Hwajeong 2	화정2동	花亭2洞	Gwangju	Seo	0.81
Hwajeong 3	화정3동	花亭3洞	Gwangju	Seo	0.74
Hwajeong 4	화정4동	花亭4洞	Gwangju	Seo	1.02
Seochang	서창동	西倉洞	Gwangju	Seo	19.67
Geumho 1	금호1동	金湖1洞	Gwangju	Seo	1.86
Geumho 2	금호2동	金湖2洞	Gwangju	Seo	1.19
Pungam	풍암동	楓岩洞	Gwangju	Seo	4.83
Dongcheon	동천동	東川洞	Gwangju	Seo	1.17
Ojeong	오정동	梧井洞	Daejeon	Daedeok	3.08
Daehwa	대화동	大禾洞	Daejeon	Daedeok	3.16
Hoedeok	회덕동	懷德洞	Daejeon	Daedeok	16.80
Birae	비래동	比來洞	Daejeon	Daedeok	3.35
Songchon	송촌동	宋村洞	Daejeon	Daedeok	1.92
Jungri	중리동	中里洞	Daejeon	Daedeok	1.50
Sintanjin	신탄진동	新灘津洞	Daejeon	Daedeok	22.98
Seokbong	석봉동	石峰洞	Daejeon	Daedeok	1.23
Deogam	덕암동	德岩洞	Daejeon	Daedeok	6.23
Moksang	목상동	木上洞	Daejeon	Daedeok	5.78
Beob 1	법1동	法1洞	Daejeon	Daedeok	0.77
Beob 2	법2동	法2洞	Daejeon	Daedeok	1.86
Jungang	중앙동	中央洞	Daejeon	Dong	1.26
Hyo	효동	孝洞	Daejeon	Dong	2.41
Sinin	신인동	新仁洞	Daejeon	Dong	0.84
Panam 1	판암1동	板岩1洞	Daejeon	Dong	5.18
Panam 2	판암2동	板岩2洞	Daejeon	Dong	0.96
Yongun	용운동	龍雲洞	Daejeon	Dong	3.47
Dae	대동	大洞	Daejeon	Dong	0.74
Jayang	자양동	紫陽洞	Daejeon	Dong	1.15
Gayang 1	가양1동	佳陽1洞	Daejeon	Dong	1.85
Gayang 2	가양2동	佳陽2洞	Daejeon	Dong	0.86
Yongjeon	용전동	龍田洞	Daejeon	Dong	1.20
Seongnam	성남동	城南洞	Daejeon	Dong	0.83
Hongdo	홍도동	弘道洞	Daejeon	Dong	0.63
Samseong	삼성동	三省洞	Daejeon	Dong	1.31
Daecheong	대청동	大淸洞	Daejeon	Dong	63.56
Sannae	산내동	山內洞	Daejeon	Dong	50.39
Boksu	복수동	福守洞	Daejeon	Seo	1.78
Doma 1	도마1동	挑馬1洞	Daejeon	Seo	1.63
Doma 2	도마2동	挑馬2洞	Daejeon	Seo	1.77
Jeongrim	정림동	正林洞	Daejeon	Seo	6.04
Byeon	변동	邊洞	Daejeon	Seo	1.48
Yongmun	용문동	龍汶洞	Daejeon	Seo	0.98
Tanbang	탄방동	炭坊洞	Daejeon	Seo	1.65
Goejeong	괴정동	槐亭洞	Daejeon	Seo	1.26
Gajang	가장동	佳狀洞	Daejeon	Seo	0.57
Nae	내동	內洞	Daejeon	Seo	0.99
Galma 1	갈마1동	葛馬1洞	Daejeon	Seo	1.50
Galma 2	갈마2동	葛馬2洞	Daejeon	Seo	0.73
Wolpyeong 1	월평1동	月坪1洞	Daejeon	Seo	2.80
Wolpyeong 2	월평2동	月坪2洞	Daejeon	Seo	0.55
Wolpyeong 3	월평3동	月坪3洞	Daejeon	Seo	0.90
Gasuwon	가수원동	佳水院洞	Daejeon	Seo	10.13
Gwanjeo 1	관저1동	關雎1洞	Daejeon	Seo	1.04
Gwanjeo 2	관저2동	關雎2洞	Daejeon	Seo	4.59
Giseong	기성동	杞城洞	Daejeon	Seo	49.16
Dunsan 1	둔산1동	屯山1洞	Daejeon	Seo	1.07
Dunsan 2	둔산2동	屯山2洞	Daejeon	Seo	2.40
Mannyeon	만년동	萬年洞	Daejeon	Seo	1.71
Dunsan 3	둔산3동	屯山3洞	Daejeon	Seo	0.75
Jinjam	진잠동	鎭岑洞	Daejeon	Yuseong	46.91
Wonsinheung	원신흥동	元新興洞	Daejeon	Yuseong	3.35
Oncheon 1	온천1동	溫泉1洞	Daejeon	Yuseong	14.64
Oncheon 2	온천2동	溫泉2洞	Daejeon	Yuseong	9.01
Noeun 1	노은1동	老隱1洞	Daejeon	Yuseong	9.21
Noeun 2	노은2동	老隱2洞	Daejeon	Yuseong	19.32
Noeun 3	노은3동	老隱3洞	Daejeon	Yuseong	?.??
Sinseong	신성동	新城洞	Daejeon	Yuseong	31.14
Jeonmin	전민동	田民洞	Daejeon	Yuseong	9.02
Gwanpyeong	관평동	官坪洞	Daejeon	Yuseong	7.20
Gujeuk	구즉동	九則洞	Daejeon	Yuseong	27.49
Eunhaengseonhwa	은행선화동	銀杏宣化洞	Daejeon	Jung	1.48
Mok	목동	牧洞	Daejeon	Jung	0.70
Jungchon	중촌동	中村洞	Daejeon	Jung	1.20
Daeheung	대흥동	大興洞	Daejeon	Jung	1.20
Munchang	문창동	文昌洞	Daejeon	Jung	0.46
Seokgyo	석교동	石橋洞	Daejeon	Jung	4.32
Daesa	대사동	大寺洞	Daejeon	Jung	2.02
Busa	부사동	芙沙洞	Daejeon	Jung	1.14
Yongdu	용두동	龍頭洞	Daejeon	Jung	0.80
Oryu	오류동	五柳洞	Daejeon	Jung	0.66
Taepyeong 1	태평1동	太平1洞	Daejeon	Jung	0.70
Taepyeong 2	태평2동	太平2洞	Daejeon	Jung	1.00
Yucheon 1	유천1동	柳川1洞	Daejeon	Jung	0.60
Yucheon 2	유천2동	柳川2洞	Daejeon	Jung	0.70
Munhwa 1	문화1동	文化1洞	Daejeon	Jung	2.17
Munhwa 2	문화2동	文化2洞	Daejeon	Jung	1.46
Sanseong	산성동	山城洞	Daejeon	Jung	41.52
Sinjeong 1	신정1동	新亭1洞	Ulsan	Nam	1.80
Sinjeong 2	신정2동	新亭2洞	Ulsan	Nam	2.67
Sinjeong 3	신정3동	新亭3洞	Ulsan	Nam	1.12
Sinjeong 4	신정4동	新亭4洞	Ulsan	Nam	0.81
Sinjeong 5	신정5동	新亭5洞	Ulsan	Nam	0.60
Dal	달동	達洞	Ulsan	Nam	1.22
Samsan	삼산동	三山洞	Ulsan	Nam	5.78
Samho	삼호동	三湖洞	Ulsan	Nam	2.42
Mugeo	무거동	無去洞	Ulsan	Nam	3.48
Ok	옥동	玉洞	Ulsan	Nam	11.23
Yaeumjangsaengpo	야음장생포동	也音長生浦洞	Ulsan	Nam	13.20
Daehyeon	대현동	大峴洞	Ulsan	Nam	1.08
Suam	수암동	峀岩洞	Ulsan	Nam	0.52
Seonam	선암동	仙岩洞	Ulsan	Nam	26.76
Bangeo	방어동	方魚洞	Ulsan	Dong	6.03
Ilsan	일산동	日山洞	Ulsan	Dong	2.08
Hwajeong	화정동	華亭洞	Ulsan	Dong	1.30
Daesong	대송동	大松洞	Ulsan	Dong	2.53
Jeonha 1	전하1동	田下1洞	Ulsan	Dong	5.13
Jeonha 2	전하2동	田下2洞	Ulsan	Dong	1.00
Nammog 1	남목1동	南牧1洞	Ulsan	Dong	4.99
Nammok 2	남목2동	南牧2洞	Ulsan	Dong	4.37
Nammok 3	남목3동	南牧3洞	Ulsan	Dong	8.59
Nongso 1	농소1동	農所1洞	Ulsan	Buk	14.91
Nongso 2	농소2동	農所2洞	Ulsan	Buk	11.41
Nongso 3	농소3동	農所3洞	Ulsan	Buk	31.07
Gangdong	강동동	江東洞	Ulsan	Buk	60.71
Hyomun	효문동	孝門洞	Ulsan	Buk	16.28
Songjeong	송정동	松亭洞	Ulsan	Buk	10.78
Yangjeong	양정동	楊亭洞	Ulsan	Buk	6.67
Yeompo	염포동	鹽浦洞	Ulsan	Buk	5.54
Hakseong	학성동	鶴城洞	Ulsan	Jung	0.93
Bangu 1	반구1동	伴鷗1洞	Ulsan	Jung	1.12
Bangu 2	반구2동	伴鷗2洞	Ulsan	Jung	0.50
Boksan 1	복산1동	福山1洞	Ulsan	Jung	0.69
Boksan 2	복산2동	福山2洞	Ulsan	Jung	0.68
Jungang	중앙동	中央洞	Ulsan	Jung	1.83
Ujeong	우정동	牛亭洞	Ulsan	Jung	1.50
Taehwa	태화동	太和洞	Ulsan	Jung	5.53
Daun	다운동	茶雲洞	Ulsan	Jung	8.96
Byeongyeong 1	병영1동	兵營1洞	Ulsan	Jung	1.45
Byeongyeong 2	병영2동	兵營2洞	Ulsan	Jung	3.99
Yaksa	약사동	藥泗洞	Ulsan	Jung	2.80
Seongan	성안동	聖安洞	Ulsan	Jung	7.14
Hansol	한솔동	洞	Sejong	none	14.90
Dodam	도담동	洞	Sejong	none	5.0
Areum	아름동	洞	Sejong	none	7.5
Jongchon	종촌동	宗村洞	Sejong	none	1.1

=== Gyeonggi ===
Neighborhood	Korean	Hanja	Provincial	Municipal	Area
Seryu 1	세류1동	細柳1洞	Gyeonggi	Suwon (Gwonseon)	0.93
Seryu 2	세류2동	細柳2洞	Gyeonggi	Suwon (Gwonseon)	3.58
Seryu 3	세류3동	細柳3洞	Gyeonggi	Suwon (Gwonseon)	1.29
Pyeong	평동	坪洞	Gyeonggi	Suwon (Gwonseon)	10.91
Seodun	서둔동	西屯洞	Gyeonggi	Suwon (Gwonseon)	8.84
Guun	구운동	九雲洞	Gyeonggi	Suwon (Gwonseon)	1.94
Geumho	금호동	金好洞	Gyeonggi	Suwon (Gwonseon)	5.44
Gwonseon 1	권선1동	勸善1洞	Gyeonggi	Suwon (Gwonseon)	1.03
Gwonseon 2	권선2동	勸善2洞	Gyeonggi	Suwon (Gwonseon)	1.81
Gokseon	곡선동	谷善洞	Gyeonggi	Suwon (Gwonseon)	4.46
Ipbuk	입북동	笠北洞	Gyeonggi	Suwon (Gwonseon)	7.08
Maetan 1	매탄1동	梅灘1洞	Gyeonggi	Suwon (Yeongtong)	1.23
Maetan 2	매탄2동	梅灘2洞	Gyeonggi	Suwon (Yeongtong)	0.79
Maetan 3	매탄3동	梅灘3洞	Gyeonggi	Suwon (Yeongtong)	2.34
Maetan 4	매탄4동	梅灘4洞	Gyeonggi	Suwon (Yeongtong)	0.78
Woncheon	원천동	遠川洞	Gyeonggi	Suwon (Yeongtong)	3.25
Gwanggyo 1	광교1동	光敎1洞	Gyeonggi	Suwon (Yeongtong)	7.97
Gwanggyo 2	광교2동	光敎2洞	Gyeonggi	Suwon (Yeongtong)	4.18
Yeongtong 1	영통1동	靈通1洞	Gyeonggi	Suwon (Yeongtong)	1.95
Yeongtong 2	영통2동	靈通2洞	Gyeonggi	Suwon (Yeongtong)	1.98
Taejang	태장동	台章洞	Gyeonggi	Suwon (Yeongtong)	3.19
Pajang	파장동	芭長洞	Gyeonggi	Suwon (Jangan)	8.62
Yulcheon	율천동	栗泉洞	Gyeonggi	Suwon (Jangan)	2.98
Jeongja 1	정자1동	亭子1洞	Gyeonggi	Suwon (Jangan)	1.27
Jeongja 2	정자2동	亭子2洞	Gyeonggi	Suwon (Jangan)	1.44
Jeongja 3	정자3동	亭子3洞	Gyeonggi	Suwon (Jangan)	1.44
Yeonghwa	영화동	迎華洞	Gyeonggi	Suwon (Jangan)	1.27
Songjuk	송죽동	松竹洞	Gyeonggi	Suwon (Jangan)	1.68
Jowon 1	조원1동	棗園1洞	Gyeonggi	Suwon (Jangan)	1.84
Jowon 2	조원2동	棗園2洞	Gyeonggi	Suwon (Jangan)	1.05
Yeonmu	연무동	鍊武洞	Gyeonggi	Suwon (Jangan)	11.58
Maegyo	매교동	梅校洞	Gyeonggi	Suwon (Paldal)	0.72
Maesan	매산동	梅山洞	Gyeonggi	Suwon (Paldal)	0.81
Godeung	고등동	高等洞	Gyeonggi	Suwon (Paldal)	1.01
Hwaseo 1	화서1동	華西1洞	Gyeonggi	Suwon (Paldal)	0.84
Hwaseo 2	화서2동	華西2洞	Gyeonggi	Suwon (Paldal)	2.10
Ji	지동	池洞	Gyeonggi	Suwon (Paldal)	0.79
Uman 1	우만1동	牛滿1洞	Gyeonggi	Suwon (Paldal)	1.14
Uman 2	우만2동	牛滿2洞	Gyeonggi	Suwon (Paldal)	0.97
Ingye	인계동	仁溪洞	Gyeonggi	Suwon (Paldal)	2.91
Haenggung	행궁동	行宮洞	Gyeonggi	Suwon (Paldal)	1.57
Bundang	분당동	盆唐洞	Gyeonggi	Seongnam (Bundang)	3.40
Sunae 1	수내1동	藪內1洞	Gyeonggi	Seongnam (Bundang)	1.03
Sunae 2	수내2동	藪內2洞	Gyeonggi	Seongnam (Bundang)	0.81
Sunae 3	수내3동	藪內3洞	Gyeonggi	Seongnam (Bundang)	0.94
Jeongja	정자동	亭子洞	Gyeonggi	Seongnam (Bundang)	?.??
Jeongja 1	정자1동	亭子1洞	Gyeonggi	Seongnam (Bundang)	2.45
Jeongja 2	정자2동	亭子2洞	Gyeonggi	Seongnam (Bundang)	0.54
Jeongja 3	정자3동	亭子3洞	Gyeonggi	Seongnam (Bundang)	1.92
Seohyeon 1	서현1동	書峴1洞	Gyeonggi	Seongnam (Bundang)	7.49
Seohyeon 2	서현2동	書峴2洞	Gyeonggi	Seongnam (Bundang)	0.79
Imae 1	이매1동	二梅1洞	Gyeonggi	Seongnam (Bundang)	2.90
Imae 2	이매2동	二梅2洞	Gyeonggi	Seongnam (Bundang)	0.68
Yatap 1	야탑1동	野塔1洞	Gyeonggi	Seongnam (Bundang)	1.16
Yatap 2	야탑2동	野塔2洞	Gyeonggi	Seongnam (Bundang)	0.64
Yatap 3	야탑3동	野塔3洞	Gyeonggi	Seongnam (Bundang)	5.08
Pangyo	판교동	板橋洞	Gyeonggi	Seongnam (Bundang)	2.93
Sampyeong	삼평동	三坪洞	Gyeonggi	Seongnam (Bundang)	3.34
Baekhyeon	백현동	栢峴洞	Gyeonggi	Seongnam (Bundang)	1.96
Geumgok	금곡동	金谷洞	Gyeonggi	Seongnam (Bundang)	5.37
Gumi 1	구미1동	九美1洞	Gyeonggi	Seongnam (Bundang)	3.05
Gumi	구미동	九美洞	Gyeonggi	Seongnam (Bundang)	4.77
Unjung	운중동	雲中洞	Gyeonggi	Seongnam (Bundang)	18.10
Sinheung 1	신흥1동	新興1洞	Gyeonggi	Seongnam (Sujeong)	0.42
Sinheung 2	신흥2동	新興2洞	Gyeonggi	Seongnam (Sujeong)	1.05
Sinheung 3	신흥3동	新興3洞	Gyeonggi	Seongnam (Sujeong)	0.32
Taepyeong 1	태평1동	太平1洞	Gyeonggi	Seongnam (Sujeong)	1.43
Taepyeong 2	태평2동	太平2洞	Gyeonggi	Seongnam (Sujeong)	0.47
Taepyeong 3	태평3동	太平3洞	Gyeonggi	Seongnam (Sujeong)	0.34
Taepyeong 4	태평4동	太平4洞	Gyeonggi	Seongnam (Sujeong)	0.37
	수진1동	壽進1洞	Gyeonggi	Seongnam (Sujeong)	0.39
	수진2동	壽進2洞	Gyeonggi	Seongnam (Sujeong)	0.86
	단대동	丹垈洞	Gyeonggi	Seongnam (Sujeong)	0.80
	산성동	山城洞	Gyeonggi	Seongnam (Sujeong)	0.58
	양지동	陽地洞	Gyeonggi	Seongnam (Sujeong)	1.26
	복정동	福井洞	Gyeonggi	Seongnam (Sujeong)	6.79
	신촌동	新村洞	Gyeonggi	Seongnam (Sujeong)	5.02
	고등동	高登洞	Gyeonggi	Seongnam (Sujeong)	12.44
	시흥동	始興洞	Gyeonggi	Seongnam (Sujeong)	13.45
	성남동	城南洞	Gyeonggi	Seongnam (Jungwon)	1.99
	중앙동	中央洞	Gyeonggi	Seongnam (Jungwon)	0.68
	금광1동	金光1洞	Gyeonggi	Seongnam (Jungwon)	0.70
	금광2동	金光2洞	Gyeonggi	Seongnam (Jungwon)	1.01
	은행1동	銀杏1洞	Gyeonggi	Seongnam (Jungwon)	0.21
	은행2동	銀杏2洞	Gyeonggi	Seongnam (Jungwon)	2.46
	상대원1동	上大院1洞	Gyeonggi	Seongnam (Jungwon)	6.79
	상대원2동	上大院2洞	Gyeonggi	Seongnam (Jungwon)	0.54
	상대원3동	上大院3洞	Gyeonggi	Seongnam (Jungwon)	0.31
	하대원동	下大院洞	Gyeonggi	Seongnam (Jungwon)	2.34
	도촌동	島村洞	Gyeonggi	Seongnam (Jungwon)	9.35
	주교동	舟橋洞	Gyeonggi	Goyang (Deogyang)	5.62
	원신동	元新洞	Gyeonggi	Goyang (Deogyang)	12.69
	흥도동	興道洞	Gyeonggi	Goyang (Deogyang)	11.32
	성사1동	星沙1洞	Gyeonggi	Goyang (Deogyang)	2.18
	성사2동	星沙2洞	Gyeonggi	Goyang (Deogyang)	0.92
	효자동	孝子洞	Gyeonggi	Goyang (Deogyang)	25.34
	신도동	神道洞	Gyeonggi	Goyang (Deogyang)	6.76
	창릉동	昌陵洞	Gyeonggi	Goyang (Deogyang)	11.57
	고양동	高陽洞	Gyeonggi	Goyang (Deogyang)	25.03
	관산동	官山洞	Gyeonggi	Goyang (Deogyang)	15.05
	능곡동	陵谷洞	Gyeonggi	Goyang (Deogyang)	13.77
	화정1동	花井1洞	Gyeonggi	Goyang (Deogyang)	2.31
	화정2동	花井2洞	Gyeonggi	Goyang (Deogyang)	1.94
	행주동	幸州洞	Gyeonggi	Goyang (Deogyang)	6.01
	행신1동	幸信1洞	Gyeonggi	Goyang (Deogyang)	0.69
	행신2동	幸信2洞	Gyeonggi	Goyang (Deogyang)	4.28
	행신3동	幸信3洞	Gyeonggi	Goyang (Deogyang)	1.94
	화전동	花田洞	Gyeonggi	Goyang (Deogyang)	7.30
	대덕동	大德洞	Gyeonggi	Goyang (Deogyang)	10.79
	식사동	食寺洞	Gyeonggi	Goyang (Ilsandong)	6.82
	중산동	中山洞	Gyeonggi	Goyang (Ilsandong)	2.85
	정발산동	鼎鉢山洞	Gyeonggi	Goyang (Ilsandong)	1.53
	풍산동	楓山洞	Gyeonggi	Goyang (Ilsandong)	5.66
	백석1동	白石1洞	Gyeonggi	Goyang (Ilsandong)	1.77
	백석2동	白石2洞	Gyeonggi	Goyang (Ilsandong)	0.80
	마두1동	馬頭1洞	Gyeonggi	Goyang (Ilsandong)	2.21
	마두2동	馬頭2洞	Gyeonggi	Goyang (Ilsandong)	0.63
	장항1동	獐項1洞	Gyeonggi	Goyang (Ilsandong)	9.42
	장항2동	獐項2洞	Gyeonggi	Goyang (Ilsandong)	2.45
	고봉동	高烽洞	Gyeonggi	Goyang (Ilsandong)	24.96
	일산1동	一山1洞	Gyeonggi	Goyang (Ilsanseo)	0.65
	일산2동	一山2洞	Gyeonggi	Goyang (Ilsanseo)	0.82
	일산3동	一山3洞	Gyeonggi	Goyang (Ilsanseo)	1.12
	탄현동	炭峴洞	Gyeonggi	Goyang (Ilsanseo)	2.19
	주엽1동	注葉1洞	Gyeonggi	Goyang (Ilsanseo)	0.97
	주엽2동	注葉2洞	Gyeonggi	Goyang (Ilsanseo)	0.96
	대화동	大化洞	Gyeonggi	Goyang (Ilsanseo)	3.78
	송포동	松浦洞	Gyeonggi	Goyang (Ilsanseo)	13.16
	송산동	松山洞	Gyeonggi	Goyang (Ilsanseo)	19.15
	신갈동	新葛面	Gyeonggi	Yongin (Giheung)	4.80
	영덕동	靈德洞	Gyeonggi	Yongin (Giheung)	9.60
	구갈동	舊葛洞	Gyeonggi	Yongin (Giheung)	4.21
	상갈동	上葛洞	Gyeonggi	Yongin (Giheung)	12.15
	기흥동	器興洞	Gyeonggi	Yongin (Giheung)	11.70
	서농동	書農洞	Gyeonggi	Yongin (Giheung)	4.21
	구성동	駒城洞	Gyeonggi	Yongin (Giheung)	6.90
	마북동	麻北洞	Gyeonggi	Yongin (Giheung)	5.39
	동백동	東栢洞	Gyeonggi	Yongin (Giheung)	10.34
	상하동	上下洞	Gyeonggi	Yongin (Giheung)	5.52
	보정동	寶亭洞	Gyeonggi	Yongin (Giheung)	6.82
	풍덕천1동	豊德川1洞	Gyeonggi	Yongin (Suji)	3.40
	풍덕천2동	豊德川2洞	Gyeonggi	Yongin (Suji)	3.40
	신봉동	新鳳洞	Gyeonggi	Yongin (Suji)	6.70
	죽전1동	竹田1洞	Gyeonggi	Yongin (Suji)	3.10
	죽전2동	竹田2洞	Gyeonggi	Yongin (Suji)	2.70
	동천동	東川洞	Gyeonggi	Yongin (Suji)	16.50
	상현1동	上峴1洞	Gyeonggi	Yongin (Suji)	3.00
	상현2동	上峴2洞	Gyeonggi	Yongin (Suji)	2.00
	성복동	星福洞	Gyeonggi	Yongin (Suji)	5.00
	중앙동	中央洞	Gyeonggi	Yongin (Cheoin)	7.97
	역삼동	驛三洞	Gyeonggi	Yongin (Cheoin)	12.50
	유림동	柳林洞	Gyeonggi	Yongin (Cheoin)	13.60
	동부동	東部洞	Gyeonggi	Yongin (Cheoin)	23.51
	심곡본1동	深谷本1洞	Gyeonggi	Bucheon (Sosa)	0.80
	심곡본동	深谷本洞	Gyeonggi	Bucheon (Sosa)	1.00
	소사본동	素砂本洞	Gyeonggi	Bucheon (Sosa)	2.00
	소사본3동	素砂本3洞	Gyeonggi	Bucheon (Sosa)	1.00
	범박동	範朴洞	Gyeonggi	Bucheon (Sosa)	2.90
	괴안동	槐安洞	Gyeonggi	Bucheon (Sosa)	1.00
	역곡3동	驛谷3洞	Gyeonggi	Bucheon (Sosa)	1.80
	송내1동	松內1洞	Gyeonggi	Bucheon (Sosa)	1.10
	송내2동	松內2洞	Gyeonggi	Bucheon (Sosa)	1.20
	성곡동	城谷洞	Gyeonggi	Bucheon (Ojeong)	4.10
	원종1동	遠宗1洞	Gyeonggi	Bucheon (Ojeong)	1.60
	원종2동	遠宗2洞	Gyeonggi	Bucheon (Ojeong)	0.80
	고강본동	古康本洞	Gyeonggi	Bucheon (Ojeong)	1.70
	고강1동	古康1洞	Gyeonggi	Bucheon (Ojeong)	1.80
	오정동	梧亭洞	Gyeonggi	Bucheon (Ojeong)	6.90
	신흥동	新興洞	Gyeonggi	Bucheon (Ojeong)	3.10
	심곡1동	深谷1洞	Gyeonggi	Bucheon (Wonmi)	0.50
	심곡2동	深谷2洞	Gyeonggi	Bucheon (Wonmi)	0.60
	심곡3동	深谷3洞	Gyeonggi	Bucheon (Wonmi)	0.40
	원미1동	遠美1洞	Gyeonggi	Bucheon (Wonmi)	1.00
	원미2동	遠美2洞	Gyeonggi	Bucheon (Wonmi)	0.50
	소사동	素砂洞	Gyeonggi	Bucheon (Wonmi)	0.60
	역곡1동	驛谷1洞	Gyeonggi	Bucheon (Wonmi)	1.10
	역곡2동	驛谷2洞	Gyeonggi	Bucheon (Wonmi)	1.10
	춘의동	春衣洞	Gyeonggi	Bucheon (Wonmi)	2.90
	도당동	陶唐洞	Gyeonggi	Bucheon (Wonmi)	2.00
	약대동	若大洞	Gyeonggi	Bucheon (Wonmi)	0.70
	중동	中洞	Gyeonggi	Bucheon (Wonmi)	0.90
	중1동	中1洞	Gyeonggi	Bucheon (Wonmi)	1.30
	중2동	中2洞	Gyeonggi	Bucheon (Wonmi)	1.20
	중3동	中3洞	Gyeonggi	Bucheon (Wonmi)	1.00
	중4동	中4洞	Gyeonggi	Bucheon (Wonmi)	0.30
	상동	上洞	Gyeonggi	Bucheon (Wonmi)	0.90
	상1동	上1洞	Gyeonggi	Bucheon (Wonmi)	0.70
	상2동	上2洞	Gyeonggi	Bucheon (Wonmi)	1.50
	상3동	上3洞	Gyeonggi	Bucheon (Wonmi)	1.40
	와동	瓦洞	Gyeonggi	Ansan (Danwon)	3.23
	고잔1동	古棧1洞	Gyeonggi	Ansan (Danwon)	1.75
	고잔2동	古棧2洞	Gyeonggi	Ansan (Danwon)	1.87
	호수동	湖水洞	Gyeonggi	Ansan (Danwon)	2.48
	원곡본동	元谷本洞	Gyeonggi	Ansan (Danwon)	8.13
	원곡1동	元谷1洞	Gyeonggi	Ansan (Danwon)	0.95
	원곡2동	元谷2洞	Gyeonggi	Ansan (Danwon)	0.56
	초지동	草芝洞	Gyeonggi	Ansan (Danwon)	21.39
	선부1동	仙府1洞	Gyeonggi	Ansan (Danwon)	0.86
	선부2동	仙府2洞	Gyeonggi	Ansan (Danwon)	2.07
	선부3동	仙府3洞	Gyeonggi	Ansan (Danwon)	5.81
	대부동	大阜洞	Gyeonggi	Ansan (Danwon)	42.41
	일동	一洞	Gyeonggi	Ansan (Sangnok)	2.74
	이동	二洞	Gyeonggi	Ansan (Sangnok)	2.09
	사1동	四1洞	Gyeonggi	Ansan (Sangnok)	2.34
	사2동	四2洞	Gyeonggi	Ansan (Sangnok)	3.65
	사3동	四3洞	Gyeonggi	Ansan (Sangnok)	3.68
	본오1동	本五1洞	Gyeonggi	Ansan (Sangnok)	6.49
	본오2동	本五2洞	Gyeonggi	Ansan (Sangnok)	0.82
	본오3동	本五3洞	Gyeonggi	Ansan (Sangnok)	1.10
	부곡동	釜谷洞	Gyeonggi	Ansan (Sangnok)	5.98
	월피동	月陂洞	Gyeonggi	Ansan (Sangnok)	5.80
	성포동	聲浦洞	Gyeonggi	Ansan (Sangnok)	1.70
	반월동	半月洞	Gyeonggi	Ansan (Sangnok)	13.25
	안산동	安山洞	Gyeonggi	Ansan (Sangnok)	8.35
	비산1동	飛山1洞	Gyeonggi	Anyang (Dongan)	1.82
	비산2동	飛山2洞	Gyeonggi	Anyang (Dongan)	0.46
	비산3동	飛山3洞	Gyeonggi	Anyang (Dongan)	5.56
	부흥동	復興洞	Gyeonggi	Anyang (Dongan)	0.50
	달안동	達安洞	Gyeonggi	Anyang (Dongan)	0.44
	관양1동	冠陽1洞	Gyeonggi	Anyang (Dongan)	3.19
	관양2동	冠陽2洞	Gyeonggi	Anyang (Dongan)	1.79
	부림동	富林洞	Gyeonggi	Anyang (Dongan)	0.86
	평촌동	坪村洞	Gyeonggi	Anyang (Dongan)	0.82
	평안동	坪安洞	Gyeonggi	Anyang (Dongan)	0.64
	귀인동	貴仁洞	Gyeonggi	Anyang (Dongan)	0.64
	호계1동	虎溪1洞	Gyeonggi	Anyang (Dongan)	1.03
	호계2동	虎溪2洞	Gyeonggi	Anyang (Dongan)	1.43
	호계3동	虎溪3洞	Gyeonggi	Anyang (Dongan)	0.75
	범계동	범계洞	Gyeonggi	Anyang (Dongan)	0.64
	신촌동	新村洞	Gyeonggi	Anyang (Dongan)	0.66
	갈산동	葛山洞	Gyeonggi	Anyang (Dongan)	0.69
	안양1동	安養1洞	Gyeonggi	Anyang (Manan)	0.67
	안양2동	安養2洞	Gyeonggi	Anyang (Manan)	2.85
	안양3동	安養3洞	Gyeonggi	Anyang (Manan)	1.02
	안양4동	安養4洞	Gyeonggi	Anyang (Manan)	0.31
	안양5동	安養5洞	Gyeonggi	Anyang (Manan)	0.50
	안양6동	安養6洞	Gyeonggi	Anyang (Manan)	1.47
	안양7동	安養7洞	Gyeonggi	Anyang (Manan)	1.04
	안양8동	安養8洞	Gyeonggi	Anyang (Manan)	1.09
	안양9동	安養9洞	Gyeonggi	Anyang (Manan)	6.42
	석수1동	石水1洞	Gyeonggi	Anyang (Manan)	9.22
	석수2동	石水2洞	Gyeonggi	Anyang (Manan)	3.43
	석수3동	石水3洞	Gyeonggi	Anyang (Manan)	0.70
	박달1동	博達1洞	Gyeonggi	Anyang (Manan)	0.93
	박달2동	博達2洞	Gyeonggi	Anyang (Manan)	6.89
	호평동	好坪洞	Gyeonggi	Namyangju	9.13
	평내동	坪內洞	Gyeonggi	Namyangju	7.24
	금곡동	金谷洞	Gyeonggi	Namyangju	6.93
	양정동	養正洞	Gyeonggi	Namyangju	12.50
	지금동	芝錦洞	Gyeonggi	Namyangju	7.48
	도농동	陶農洞	Gyeonggi	Namyangju	2.17
	별내동	別內洞	Gyeonggi	Namyangju	18.62
	진안동	陳雁洞	Gyeonggi	Hwaseong	7.10
	병점1동	餠店1洞	Gyeonggi	Hwaseong	1.50
	병점2동	餠店2洞	Gyeonggi	Hwaseong	1.00
	반월동	半月洞	Gyeonggi	Hwaseong	3.90
	기배동	旗培洞	Gyeonggi	Hwaseong	4.20
	화산동	花山洞	Gyeonggi	Hwaseong	11.50
	동탄1동	東灘1洞	Gyeonggi	Hwaseong	5.38
	동탄2동	東灘2洞	Gyeonggi	Hwaseong	1.86
	동탄3동	東灘3洞	Gyeonggi	Hwaseong	1.91
	동탄4동	東灘4洞	Gyeonggi	Hwaseong	14.19
	의정부1동	議政府1洞	Gyeonggi	Uijeongbu	1.23
	의정부2동	議政府2洞	Gyeonggi	Uijeongbu	2.49
	의정부3동	議政府3洞	Gyeonggi	Uijeongbu	0.72
	호원1동	虎院1洞	Gyeonggi	Uijeongbu	6.58
	호원2동	虎院2洞	Gyeonggi	Uijeongbu	4.19
	장암동	長岩洞	Gyeonggi	Uijeongbu	8.94
	신곡1동	新谷1洞	Gyeonggi	Uijeongbu	2.55
	신곡2동	新谷2洞	Gyeonggi	Uijeongbu	2.82
	송산1동	松山1洞	Gyeonggi	Uijeongbu	16.10
	송산2동	松山2洞	Gyeonggi	Uijeongbu	10.74
	자금동	自金洞	Gyeonggi	Uijeongbu	11.78
	가능1동	佳陵1洞	Gyeonggi	Uijeongbu	3.97
	가능2동	佳陵2洞	Gyeonggi	Uijeongbu	1.08
	가능3동	佳陵3洞	Gyeonggi	Uijeongbu	4.76
	녹양동	綠楊洞	Gyeonggi	Uijeongbu	3.81
	광명1동	光明1洞	Gyeonggi	Gwangmyeong	0.31
	광명2동	光明2洞	Gyeonggi	Gwangmyeong	0.28
	광명3동	光明3洞	Gyeonggi	Gwangmyeong	0.30
	광명4동	光明4洞	Gyeonggi	Gwangmyeong	0.27
	광명5동	光明5洞	Gyeonggi	Gwangmyeong	0.44
	광명6동	光明6洞	Gyeonggi	Gwangmyeong	2.41
	광명7동	光明7洞	Gyeonggi	Gwangmyeong	2.34
	철산1동	鐵山1洞	Gyeonggi	Gwangmyeong	0.52
	철산2동	鐵山2洞	Gyeonggi	Gwangmyeong	0.95
	철산3동	鐵山3洞	Gyeonggi	Gwangmyeong	1.05
	철산4동	鐵山4洞	Gyeonggi	Gwangmyeong	0.32
	하안1동	下安1洞	Gyeonggi	Gwangmyeong	3.95
	하안2동	下安2洞	Gyeonggi	Gwangmyeong	0.51
	하안3동	下安3洞	Gyeonggi	Gwangmyeong	0.53
	하안4동	下安4洞	Gyeonggi	Gwangmyeong	0.38
	소하1동	所下1洞	Gyeonggi	Gwangmyeong	3.80
	소하2동	所下2洞	Gyeonggi	Gwangmyeong	7.25
	학온동	鶴溫洞	Gyeonggi	Gwangmyeong	12.89
	중앙동	中央洞	Gyeonggi	Pyeongtaek	8.14
	서정동	西井洞	Gyeonggi	Pyeongtaek	2.55
	송탄동	松炭洞	Gyeonggi	Pyeongtaek	20.33
	지산동	芝山洞	Gyeonggi	Pyeongtaek	0.66
	송북동	松北洞	Gyeonggi	Pyeongtaek	7.16
	신장1동	新場1洞	Gyeonggi	Pyeongtaek	1.58
	신장2동	新場2洞	Gyeonggi	Pyeongtaek	0.69
	신평동	新平洞	Gyeonggi	Pyeongtaek	6.45
	원평동	原平洞	Gyeonggi	Pyeongtaek	5.02
	통복동	通伏洞	Gyeonggi	Pyeongtaek	0.36
	비전1동	碑前1洞	Gyeonggi	Pyeongtaek	15.48
	비전2동	碑前2洞	Gyeonggi	Pyeongtaek	6.98
	세교동	細橋洞	Gyeonggi	Pyeongtaek	7.96
	생연1동	生淵1洞	Gyeonggi	Dongducheon	2.16
	생연2동	生淵2洞	Gyeonggi	Dongducheon	0.72
	중앙동	中央洞	Gyeonggi	Dongducheon	0.85
	보산동	保山洞	Gyeonggi	Dongducheon	13.68
	불현동	佛峴洞	Gyeonggi	Dongducheon	33.37
	송내동	松內洞	Gyeonggi	Dongducheon	5.52
	소요동	消遙洞	Gyeonggi	Dongducheon	31.31
	상패동	上牌洞	Gyeonggi	Dongducheon	8.05
	중앙동	中央洞	Gyeonggi	Gwacheon	6.99
	갈현동	葛峴洞	Gyeonggi	Gwacheon	4.36
	별양동	別陽洞	Gyeonggi	Gwacheon	0.68
	부림동	富林洞	Gyeonggi	Gwacheon	0.37
	과천동	果川洞	Gyeonggi	Gwacheon	10.77
	문원동	文原洞	Gyeonggi	Gwacheon	12.69
	갈매동	葛梅洞	Gyeonggi	Guri	3.95
	동구동	東九洞	Gyeonggi	Guri	7.32
	인창동	仁倉洞	Gyeonggi	Guri	2.10
	교문1동	橋門1洞	Gyeonggi	Guri	7.55
	교문2동	橋門2洞	Gyeonggi	Guri	1.15
	수택1동	水澤1洞	Gyeonggi	Guri	1.26
	수택2동	水澤2洞	Gyeonggi	Guri	0.62
	수택3동	水澤3洞	Gyeonggi	Guri	9.34
	중앙동	中央洞	Gyeonggi	Osan	3.66
	남촌동	南村洞	Gyeonggi	Osan	6.06
	신장동	新場洞	Gyeonggi	Osan	7.04
	세마동	洗馬洞	Gyeonggi	Osan	13.32
	초평동	楚坪洞	Gyeonggi	Osan	6.48
	대원동	大園洞	Gyeonggi	Osan	6.18
	대야동	大也洞	Gyeonggi	Siheung	9.85
	신천동	新川洞	Gyeonggi	Siheung	3.44
	신현동	新峴洞	Gyeonggi	Siheung	12.59
	은행동	銀杏洞	Gyeonggi	Siheung	5.98
	매화동	梅花洞	Gyeonggi	Siheung	11.20
	목감동	牧甘洞	Gyeonggi	Siheung	17.58
	군자동	君子洞	Gyeonggi	Siheung	18.3
	월곶동	月串洞	Gyeonggi	Siheung	?.??
	정왕본동	正往本洞	Gyeonggi	Siheung	8.32
	정왕1동	正往1洞	Gyeonggi	Siheung	6.51
	정왕2동	正往2洞	Gyeonggi	Siheung	4.81
	정왕3동	正往3洞	Gyeonggi	Siheung	6.64
	정왕4동	正往4洞	Gyeonggi	Siheung	5.88
	과림동	果林洞	Gyeonggi	Siheung	7.65
	연성동	蓮城洞	Gyeonggi	Siheung	13.54
	장곡동	長谷洞	Gyeonggi	Siheung	?.??
	능곡동	陵谷洞	Gyeonggi	Siheung	4.34
	군포1동	軍浦一洞	Gyeonggi	Gunpo	3.84
	군포2동	軍浦二洞	Gyeonggi	Gunpo	5.89
	산본1동	山本一洞	Gyeonggi	Gunpo	0.72
	산본2동	山本二洞	Gyeonggi	Gunpo	1.36
	수리동	修理洞	Gyeonggi	Gunpo	2.73
	궁내동	宮內洞	Gyeonggi	Gunpo	1.82
	광정동	光亭洞	Gyeonggi	Gunpo	1.89
	금정동	衿井洞	Gyeonggi	Gunpo	1.26
	재궁동	齋宮洞	Gyeonggi	Gunpo	0.87
	오금동	五禁洞	Gyeonggi	Gunpo	1.18
	대야동	大夜洞	Gyeonggi	Gunpo	15.34
	고천동	古川洞	Gyeonggi	Uiwang	8.90
	부곡동	富谷洞	Gyeonggi	Uiwang	11.30
	오전동	五全洞	Gyeonggi	Uiwang	6.70
	내손1동	內蓀一洞	Gyeonggi	Uiwang	2.60
	내손2동	內蓀二洞	Gyeonggi	Uiwang	2.50
	청계동	淸溪洞	Gyeonggi	Uiwang	22.10
	천현동	泉峴洞	Gyeonggi	Hanam	34.92
	신장1동	新長1洞	Gyeonggi	Hanam	0.20
	신장2동	新長2洞	Gyeonggi	Hanam	4.14
	덕풍1동	德豊1洞	Gyeonggi	Hanam	1.01
	덕풍2동	德豊2洞	Gyeonggi	Hanam	0.51
	덕풍3동	德豊3洞	Gyeonggi	Hanam	2.32
	풍산동	豊山洞	Gyeonggi	Hanam	?.??
	미사1동	渼沙1洞	Gyeonggi	Hanam	6.74
	미사2동	渼沙2洞	Gyeonggi	Hanam	?.??
	감북동	甘北洞	Gyeonggi	Hanam	15.02
	초이동	草二洞	Gyeonggi	Hanam	7.63
	춘궁동	春宮洞	Gyeonggi	Hanam	15.37
	금촌1동	金村一洞	Gyeonggi	Paju	4.52
	금촌2동	金村二洞	Gyeonggi	Paju	2.72
	금촌3동	金村三洞	Gyeonggi	Paju	17.01
	교하동	交河洞	Gyeonggi	Paju	36.88
	운정1동	雲井一洞	Gyeonggi	Paju	9.69
	운정2동	雲井二洞	Gyeonggi	Paju	3.23
	운정3동	雲井三洞	Gyeonggi	Paju	5.91
	관고동	官庫洞	Gyeonggi	Icheon	7.756
	중리동	中里洞	Gyeonggi	Icheon	22.09
	증포동	增浦洞	Gyeonggi	Icheon	8.92
	창전동	倉前洞	Gyeonggi	Icheon	1.13
	안성1동	安城1洞	Gyeonggi	Anseong	6.55
	안성2동	安城2洞	Gyeonggi	Anseong	10.14
	안성3동	安城3洞	Gyeonggi	Anseong	8.27
	김포1동	金浦一洞	Gyeonggi	Gimpo	11.8
	김포2동	金浦二洞	Gyeonggi	Gimpo	2.88
	사우동	沙隅洞	Gyeonggi	Gimpo	3.32
	풍무동	豊舞洞	Gyeonggi	Gimpo	4.40
	장기동	場基洞	Gyeonggi	Gimpo	4.43
	구래동	九來洞	Gyeonggi	Gimpo	5.06
	운양동	雲陽洞	Gyeonggi	Gimpo	7.13
	경안동	京安洞	Gyeonggi	Gwangju	6.40
	송정동	松亭洞	Gyeonggi	Gwangju	21.88
	광남동	廣南洞	Gyeonggi	Gwangju	28.50
	양주1동	楊州1洞	Gyeonggi	Yangju	23.64
	양주2동	楊州2洞	Gyeonggi	Yangju	19.50
	회천1동	檜泉1洞	Gyeonggi	Yangju	10.54
	회천2동	檜泉2洞	Gyeonggi	Yangju	11.18
	회천3동	檜泉3洞	Gyeonggi	Yangju	3.81
	회천4동	檜泉4洞	Gyeonggi	Yangju	17.13
	포천동	抱川洞	Gyeonggi	Pocheon	11.35
	선단동	仙壇洞	Gyeonggi	Pocheon	23.92
	여흥동	驪興洞	Gyeonggi	Yeoju	38.72
	중앙동	中央洞	Gyeonggi	Yeoju	17.77
	오학동	五鶴洞	Gyeonggi	Yeoju	16.88

=== Gangwon ===
Neighborhood	Korean	Hanja	Provincial	Municipal	Area
Jungang	중앙동	中央洞	Gangwon	Wonju	1.90
Wonin	원인동	園仁洞	Gangwon	Wonju	0.48
Gaeun	개운동	開運洞	Gangwon	Wonju	1.05
Myeongnyun 1	명륜1동	明倫1洞	Gangwon	Wonju	0.92
Myeongnyun 2	명륜2동	明倫2洞	Gangwon	Wonju	0.94
Dangu	단구동	丹邱洞	Gangwon	Wonju	3.91
Ilsan	일산동	一山洞	Gangwon	Wonju	0.80
Hakseong	학성동	鶴城洞	Gangwon	Wonju	0.73
Dangye	단계동	丹溪洞	Gangwon	Wonju	4.16
Usan	우산동	牛山洞	Gangwon	Wonju	7.40
Taejang 1	태장1동	台壯1洞	Gangwon	Wonju	3.04
Taejang 2	태장2동	台壯2洞	Gangwon	Wonju	8.94
Bongsan	봉산동	鳳山洞	Gangwon	Wonju	7.26
Haenggu	행구동	杏邱洞	Gangwon	Wonju	13.44
Musil	무실동	茂實洞	Gangwon	Wonju	8.59
Bangokgwanseol	반곡관설동	盤谷觀雪洞	Gangwon	Wonju	21.00
Gyo	교동	校洞	Gangwon	Chuncheon	0.50
Joun	조운동	朝雲洞	Gangwon	Chuncheon	0.32
Yaksamyeong	약사명동	藥司明洞	Gangwon	Chuncheon	0.52
Geunhwa	근화동	槿花洞	Gangwon	Chuncheon	9.59
Soyang	소양동	昭陽洞	Gangwon	Chuncheon	1.26
Hupyeong 1	후평1동	後坪1洞	Gangwon	Chuncheon	1.86
Hupyeong 2	후평2동	後坪2洞	Gangwon	Chuncheon	0.67
Hupyeong 3	후평3동	後坪3洞	Gangwon	Chuncheon	1.21
Hyoja 1	효자1동	孝子1洞	Gangwon	Chuncheon	0.65
Hyoja 2	효자2동	孝子2洞	Gangwon	Chuncheon	1.16
Hyoja 3	효자3동	孝子3洞	Gangwon	Chuncheon	0.85
Seoksa	석사동	碩士洞	Gangwon	Chuncheon	4.08
Toegye	퇴계동	退溪洞	Gangwon	Chuncheon	4.13
Gangnam	강남동	江南洞	Gangwon	Chuncheon	14.65
Sinsau	신사우동	新史牛洞	Gangwon	Chuncheon	11.62
Hongje	홍제동	洪濟洞	Gangwon	Gangneung	3.76
Jungang	중앙동	中央洞	Gangwon	Gangneung	0.99
Okcheon	옥천동	玉泉洞	Gangwon	Gangneung	0.58
Gyo 1	교1동	校1洞	Gangwon	Gangneung	2.73
Gyo 2	교2동	校2洞	Gangwon	Gangneung	2.57
Ponam 1	포남1동	浦南1洞	Gangwon	Gangneung	1.30
Ponam 2	포남2동	浦南2洞	Gangwon	Gangneung	2.58
Chodang	초당동	草堂洞	Gangwon	Gangneung	2.89
Songjeong	송정동	松亭洞	Gangwon	Gangneung	3.45
Naegok	내곡동	內谷洞	Gangwon	Gangneung	4.96
Gangnam	강남동	江南洞	Gangwon	Gangneung	16.09
Seongdeok	성덕동	城德洞	Gangwon	Gangneung	11.41
Gyeongpo	경포동	鏡浦洞	Gangwon	Gangneung	23.02
Cheongok	천곡동	泉谷洞	Gangwon	Donghae	10.39
Songjeong	송정동	松亭洞	Gangwon	Donghae	5.27
Buksam	북삼동	北三洞	Gangwon	Donghae	16.60
Bugok	부곡동	釜谷洞	Gangwon	Donghae	5.08
Dongho	동호동	東湖洞	Gangwon	Donghae	2.87
Balhan	발한동	發翰洞	Gangwon	Donghae	1.15
Mukho	묵호동	墨湖洞	Gangwon	Donghae	3.35
Bukpyeong	북평동	北坪洞	Gangwon	Donghae	19.31
Mangsang	망상동	望祥洞	Gangwon	Donghae	25.79
Samhwa	삼화동	三和洞	Gangwon	Donghae	90.36
Yeongrang	영랑동	永朗洞	Gangwon	Sokcho	7.60
Dongmyeong	동명동	東明洞	Gangwon	Sokcho	0.78
Geumho	금호동	金琴洞	Gangwon	Sokcho	1.43
Gyo	교동	校洞	Gangwon	Sokcho	0.75
Nohak	노학동	蘆鶴洞	Gangwon	Sokcho	22.3
Joyang	조양동	朝陽洞	Gangwon	Sokcho	5.61
Cheongho	청호동	靑湖洞	Gangwon	Sokcho	0.93
Daepo	대포동	大浦洞	Gangwon	Sokcho	65.89
Namyang	남양동	南陽洞	Gangwon	Samcheok	18.18
Seongnae	성내동	城內洞	Gangwon	Samcheok	22.69
Gyo	교동	校洞	Gangwon	Samcheok	9.52
Jeongna	정라동	汀羅洞	Gangwon	Samcheok	2.96
Hwangji	황지동	黃池洞	Gangwon	Taebaek	8.75
Hwangyeon	황연동	黃蓮洞	Gangwon	Taebaek	38.75
Samsoo	삼수동	三水洞	Gangwon	Taebaek	113.91
Sangjang	상장동	上長洞	Gangwon	Taebaek	9.74
Mungoksodo	문곡소도동	文曲所道洞	Gangwon	Taebaek	71.83
Jangseong	장성동	長省洞	Gangwon	Taebaek	11.84
Gumoonso	구문소동	求文沼洞	Gangwon	Taebaek	27.51
Cheoram	철암동	鐵岩洞	Gangwon	Taebaek	21.11

=== North Chungcheong ===
Neighborhood	Korean	Hanja	Provincial	Municipal	Area
	낭성면	琅城面	North Chungcheong	Cheongju (Sangdang)	59.58
	미원면	米院面	North Chungcheong	Cheongju (Sangdang)	129.64
	가덕면	加德面	North Chungcheong	Cheongju (Sangdang)	49.80
	남일면	南一面	North Chungcheong	Cheongju (Sangdang)	35.18
	문의면	文義面	North Chungcheong	Cheongju (Sangdang)	93.30
	중앙동	中央洞	North Chungcheong	Cheongju (Sangdang)	1.79
	성안동	城安洞	North Chungcheong	Cheongju (Sangdang)	1.16
	탑·대성동	塔·大成洞	North Chungcheong	Cheongju (Sangdang)	0.79
	영운동	永雲洞	North Chungcheong	Cheongju (Sangdang)	0.80
	금천동	金川洞	North Chungcheong	Cheongju (Sangdang)	1.48
	용담·명암·산성동	龍潭·明岩·山城洞	North Chungcheong	Cheongju (Sangdang)	8.52
	용암1동	龍岩一洞	North Chungcheong	Cheongju (Sangdang)	8.87
	용암2동	龍岩二洞	North Chungcheong	Cheongju (Sangdang)	13.64
	남이면	南二面	North Chungcheong	Cheongju (Seowon)	48.84
	현도면	賢都面	North Chungcheong	Cheongju (Seowon)	43.47
	사직1동	社稷一洞	North Chungcheong	Cheongju (Seowon)	1.35
	사직2동	社稷二洞	North Chungcheong	Cheongju (Seowon)	0.88
	사창동	司倉洞	North Chungcheong	Cheongju (Seowon)	1.04
	모충동	慕忠洞	North Chungcheong	Cheongju (Seowon)	1.59
	산남동	山南洞	North Chungcheong	Cheongju (Seowon)	3.70
	분평동	紛坪洞	North Chungcheong	Cheongju (Seowon)	1.90
	수곡1동	秀谷一洞	North Chungcheong	Cheongju (Seowon)	1.41
	수곡2동	秀谷二洞	North Chungcheong	Cheongju (Seowon)	0.48
	성화·개신·죽림동	聖化·開新·竹林洞	North Chungcheong	Cheongju (Seowon)	6.11
	오송읍	五松邑	North Chungcheong	Cheongju (Heungdeok)	40.74
	강내면	江內面	North Chungcheong	Cheongju (Heungdeok)	29.99
	옥산면	玉山面	North Chungcheong	Cheongju (Heungdeok)	65.49
	운천·신봉동	雲泉·新鳳洞	North Chungcheong	Cheongju (Heungdeok)	2.12
	복대1동	福臺一洞	North Chungcheong	Cheongju (Heungdeok)	2.74
	복대2동	福臺二洞	North Chungcheong	Cheongju (Heungdeok)	0.94
	가경동	佳景洞	North Chungcheong	Cheongju (Heungdeok)	3.31
	봉명1동	鳳鳴1洞	North Chungcheong	Cheongju (Heungdeok)	0.78
	봉명2·송정동	鳳鳴2·松亭洞	North Chungcheong	Cheongju (Heungdeok)	4.73
	강서1동	江西1洞	North Chungcheong	Cheongju (Heungdeok)	30.7
	강서2동	江西2洞	North Chungcheong	Cheongju (Heungdeok)	16.61
	내수읍	內秀邑	North Chungcheong	Cheongju (Cheongwon)	55.37
	오창읍	梧倉邑	North Chungcheong	Cheongju (Cheongwon)	80.20
	북이면	北二面	North Chungcheong	Cheongju (Cheongwon)	47.46
	우암동	牛岩洞	North Chungcheong	Cheongju (Cheongwon)	1.75
	내덕1동	內德一洞	North Chungcheong	Cheongju (Cheongwon)	1.48
	내덕2동	內德二洞	North Chungcheong	Cheongju (Cheongwon)	1.36
	율량사천동	栗陽·斜川洞	North Chungcheong	Cheongju (Cheongwon)	8.54
	오근장동	梧根場洞	North Chungcheong	Cheongju (Cheongwon)	18.87
	성내충인동	城內忠仁洞	North Chungcheong	Chungju	0.50
	교현안림동	校峴安林洞	North Chungcheong	Chungju	27.70
	교현2동	校峴2洞	North Chungcheong	Chungju	0.90
	용산동	龍山洞	North Chungcheong	Chungju	1.50
	지현동	之峴洞	North Chungcheong	Chungju	0.60
	문화동	文化洞	North Chungcheong	Chungju	1.00
	호암직동	虎岩直洞	North Chungcheong	Chungju	14.30
	달천동	達川洞	North Chungcheong	Chungju	23.00
	봉방동	鳳方洞	North Chungcheong	Chungju	3.60
	칠금금릉동	漆琴金陵洞	North Chungcheong	Chungju	5.90
	연수동	連守洞	North Chungcheong	Chungju	5.00
	목행용탄동	牧杏龍灘洞	North Chungcheong	Chungju	13.60
	교동	校洞	North Chungcheong	Jecheon	3.75
	의암동	義岩洞	North Chungcheong	Jecheon	12.24
	인성동	仁星洞	North Chungcheong	Jecheon	0.97
	남현동	南峴洞	North Chungcheong	Jecheon	0.85
	영서동	榮西洞	North Chungcheong	Jecheon	10.89
	용두동	龍頭洞	North Chungcheong	Jecheon	15.39
	신백동	新百洞	North Chungcheong	Jecheon	34.53
	청전동	靑田洞	North Chungcheong	Jecheon	2.75
	화산동	花山洞	North Chungcheong	Jecheon	13.02

=== South Chungcheong ===
Neighborhood	Korean	Hanja	Provincial	Municipal	Area
	중앙동	中央洞	South Chungcheong	Cheonan (Dongnam)	0.86
	문성동	文城洞	South Chungcheong	Cheonan (Dongnam)	0.60
	원성1동	院城1洞	South Chungcheong	Cheonan (Dongnam)	7.30
	원성2동	院城2洞	South Chungcheong	Cheonan (Dongnam)	0.84
	신안동	新安洞	South Chungcheong	Cheonan (Dongnam)	11.54
	봉명동	鳳鳴洞	South Chungcheong	Cheonan (Dongnam)	1.57
	일봉동	日峰洞	South Chungcheong	Cheonan (Dongnam)	2.53
	신방동	新芳洞	South Chungcheong	Cheonan (Dongnam)	5.47
	청룡동	淸龍洞	South Chungcheong	Cheonan (Dongnam)	16.89
	성정1동	星井1洞	South Chungcheong	Cheonan (Seobuk)	1.42
	성정2동	星井2洞	South Chungcheong	Cheonan (Seobuk)	2.08
	쌍용1동	雙龍1洞	South Chungcheong	Cheonan (Seobuk)	0.87
	쌍용2동	雙龍2洞	South Chungcheong	Cheonan (Seobuk)	1.88
	쌍용3동	雙龍3洞	South Chungcheong	Cheonan (Seobuk)	1.54
	불당동	佛堂洞	South Chungcheong	Cheonan (Seobuk)	4.50
	백석동	白石洞	South Chungcheong	Cheonan (Seobuk)	4.63
	부성1동	富城1洞	South Chungcheong	Cheonan (Seobuk)	12.1
	부성2동	富城2洞	South Chungcheong	Cheonan (Seobuk)	7.00
	중학동	中學洞	South Chungcheong	Gongju	1.46
	웅진동	熊津洞	South Chungcheong	Gongju	6.61
	금학동	金鶴洞	South Chungcheong	Gongju	29.99
	옥룡동	玉龍洞	South Chungcheong	Gongju	20.41
	신관동	新官洞	South Chungcheong	Gongju	18.77
	월송동	月松洞	South Chungcheong	Gongju	23.65
	대천1동	大川1洞	South Chungcheong	Boryeong	5.22
	대천2동	大川2洞	South Chungcheong	Boryeong	4.06
	대천3동	大川3洞	South Chungcheong	Boryeong	8.45
	대천4동	大川4洞	South Chungcheong	Boryeong	7.53
	대천5동	大川5洞	South Chungcheong	Boryeong	22.04
	온양1동	溫陽1洞	South Chungcheong	Asan	1.44
	온양2동	溫陽2洞	South Chungcheong	Asan	0.76
	온양3동	溫陽3洞	South Chungcheong	Asan	6.27
	온양4동	溫陽4洞	South Chungcheong	Asan	10.06
	온양5동	溫陽5洞	South Chungcheong	Asan	13.01
	온양6동	溫陽6洞	South Chungcheong	Asan	10.75
	부춘동	富春洞	South Chungcheong	Seosan	9.44
	동문1동	東門1洞	South Chungcheong	Seosan	8.76
	동문2동	東門2洞	South Chungcheong	Seosan	?.??
	수석동	壽石洞	South Chungcheong	Seosan	8.78
	석남동	石南洞	South Chungcheong	Seosan	29.39
	취암동	鷲岩洞	South Chungcheong	Nonsan	10.46
	부창동	富倉洞	South Chungcheong	Nonsan	7.55
	금암동	金岩洞	South Chungcheong	Gyeryong	2.88
	당진1동	唐津1洞	South Chungcheong	Dangjin	6.03
	당진2동	唐津2洞	South Chungcheong	Dangjin	29.60
	당진3동	唐津3洞	South Chungcheong	Dangjin	15.60

=== North Jeolla ===
Neighborhood	Korean	Hanja	Provincial	Municipal	Area
	중앙동	中央洞	North Jeolla	Jeonju (Wansan)	1.36
	풍남동	豊南洞	North Jeolla	Jeonju (Wansan)	2.15
	노송동	老松洞	North Jeolla	Jeonju (Wansan)	2.09
	완산동	完山洞	North Jeolla	Jeonju (Wansan)	1.00
	동서학동	東捿鶴洞	North Jeolla	Jeonju (Wansan)	15.67
	서서학동	西捿鶴洞	North Jeolla	Jeonju (Wansan)	2.96
	중화산1동	中華山1洞	North Jeolla	Jeonju (Wansan)	1.22
	중화산2동	中華山2洞	North Jeolla	Jeonju (Wansan)	1.73
	평화1동	平和1洞	North Jeolla	Jeonju (Wansan)	1.49
	평화2동	平和2洞	North Jeolla	Jeonju (Wansan)	15.26
	서신동	西新洞	North Jeolla	Jeonju (Wansan)	2.40
	삼천1동	三川1洞	North Jeolla	Jeonju (Wansan)	1.76
	삼천2동	三川2洞	North Jeolla	Jeonju (Wansan)	0.95
	삼천3동	三川3洞	North Jeolla	Jeonju (Wansan)	26.63
	효자1동	孝子1洞	North Jeolla	Jeonju (Wansan)	0.76
	효자2동	孝子2洞	North Jeolla	Jeonju (Wansan)	0.84
	효자3동	孝子3洞	North Jeolla	Jeonju (Wansan)	2.43
	효자4동	孝子4洞	North Jeolla	Jeonju (Wansan)	15.22
	진북동	鎭北洞	North Jeolla	Jeonju (Deokjin)	1.71
	인후1동	麟後1洞	North Jeolla	Jeonju (Deokjin)	1.27
	인후2동	麟後2洞	North Jeolla	Jeonju (Deokjin)	1.32
	인후3동	麟後3洞	North Jeolla	Jeonju (Deokjin)	1.67
	덕진동	德津洞	North Jeolla	Jeonju (Deokjin)	2.78
	금암1동	金岩1洞	North Jeolla	Jeonju (Deokjin)	1.27
	금암2동	金岩2洞	North Jeolla	Jeonju (Deokjin)	1.25
	팔복동	八福洞	North Jeolla	Jeonju (Deokjin)	7.38
	우아1동	牛牙1洞	North Jeolla	Jeonju (Deokjin)	1.44
	우아2동	牛牙2洞	North Jeolla	Jeonju (Deokjin)	22.93
	호성동	湖城洞	North Jeolla	Jeonju (Deokjin)	7.64
	송천1동	松川1洞	North Jeolla	Jeonju (Deokjin)	4.79
	송천2동	松川2洞	North Jeolla	Jeonju (Deokjin)	12.14
	조촌동	助村洞	North Jeolla	Jeonju (Deokjin)	24.27
	동산동	東山洞	North Jeolla	Jeonju (Deokjin)	16.93
	중앙동	中央洞	North Jeolla	Iksan	0.90
	평화동	平和洞	North Jeolla	Iksan	6.80
	인화동	仁和洞	North Jeolla	Iksan	2.20
	동산동	銅山洞	North Jeolla	Iksan	12.70
	마동	馬洞	North Jeolla	Iksan	1.50
	남중동	南中洞	North Jeolla	Iksan	1.80
	모현동	慕懸洞	North Jeolla	Iksan	3.50
	송학동	松鶴洞	North Jeolla	Iksan	1.50
	신동	新洞	North Jeolla	Iksan	12.4
	영등1동	永登1洞	North Jeolla	Iksan	2.10
	영등2동	永登2洞	North Jeolla	Iksan	1.70
	어양동	於陽洞	North Jeolla	Iksan	1.5
	팔봉동	八峯洞	North Jeolla	Iksan	21.60
	삼성동	三星洞	North Jeolla	Iksan	12.90
	해신동	海新洞	North Jeolla	Gunsan	2.01
	월명동	月明洞	North Jeolla	Gunsan	1.14
	신풍동	新豊洞	North Jeolla	Gunsan	1.22
	삼학동	三鶴洞	North Jeolla	Gunsan	0.57
	중앙동	中央洞	North Jeolla	Gunsan	0.66
	흥남동	興南洞	North Jeolla	Gunsan	0.97
	조촌동	助村洞	North Jeolla	Gunsan	3.11
	경암동	京岩洞	North Jeolla	Gunsan	1.23
	구암동	龜岩洞	North Jeolla	Gunsan	5.64
	개정동	開井洞	North Jeolla	Gunsan	5.11
	수송동	秀松洞	North Jeolla	Gunsan	5.36
	나운1동	羅雲1洞	North Jeolla	Gunsan	10.97
	나운2동	羅雲2洞	North Jeolla	Gunsan	?.??
	나운3동	羅雲3洞	North Jeolla	Gunsan	?.??
	소룡동	小龍洞	North Jeolla	Gunsan	30.87
	미성동	米星洞	North Jeolla	Gunsan	26.8
	수성동	水城洞	North Jeolla	Jeongeup	5.90
	장명동	長明洞	North Jeolla	Jeongeup	6.55
	내장상동	內藏上洞	North Jeolla	Jeongeup	45.17
	시기동	市基洞	North Jeolla	Jeongeup	0.45
	초산동	楚山洞	North Jeolla	Jeongeup	2.90
	연지동	蓮池洞	North Jeolla	Jeongeup	1.71
	농소동	農所洞	North Jeolla	Jeongeup	18.81
	상교동	上橋洞	North Jeolla	Jeongeup	46.16
	요촌동	堯村洞	North Jeolla	Gimje	11.06
	신풍동	新豊洞	North Jeolla	Gimje	23.09
	검산동	劒山洞	North Jeolla	Gimje	14.14
	교월동	校月洞	North Jeolla	Gimje	27.94
	동충동	東忠洞	North Jeolla	Namwon	0.60
	죽항동	竹巷洞	North Jeolla	Namwon	0.70
	노암동	鷺岩洞	North Jeolla	Namwon	8.90
	금동	錦洞	North Jeolla	Namwon	2.00
	왕정동	王亭洞	North Jeolla	Namwon	6.10
	향교동	鄕校洞	North Jeolla	Namwon	18.50
	도통동	道通洞	North Jeolla	Namwon	15.40

=== South Jeolla ===
Neighborhood	Korean	Hanja	Provincial	Municipal	Area
	용당1동	龍塘1洞	South Jeolla	Mokpo	1.45
	용당2동	龍塘2洞	South Jeolla	Mokpo	0.90
	연동	蓮洞	South Jeolla	Mokpo	0.67
	산정동	山亭洞	South Jeolla	Mokpo	0.76
	대성동	大成洞	South Jeolla	Mokpo	0.34
	목원동	木原洞	South Jeolla	Mokpo	1.48
	동명동	東明洞	South Jeolla	Mokpo	0.79
	삼학동	三鶴洞	South Jeolla	Mokpo	0.75
	만호동	萬戶洞	South Jeolla	Mokpo	0.94
	유달동	儒達洞	South Jeolla	Mokpo	12.50
	죽교동	竹橋洞	South Jeolla	Mokpo	0.75
	이로동	二老洞	South Jeolla	Mokpo	1.90
	북항동	北港洞	South Jeolla	Mokpo	0.75
	용해동	龍海洞	South Jeolla	Mokpo	2.11
	연산동	連山洞	South Jeolla	Mokpo	2.88
	원산동	元山洞	South Jeolla	Mokpo	0.62
	상동	上洞	South Jeolla	Mokpo	3.12
	하당동	下塘洞	South Jeolla	Mokpo	1.20
	신흥동	新興洞	South Jeolla	Mokpo	1.79
	삼향동	三鄕洞	South Jeolla	Mokpo	7.7
	옥암동	玉岩洞	South Jeolla	Mokpo	2.58
	부흥동	復興洞	South Jeolla	Mokpo	2.79
	부주동	浮珠洞	South Jeolla	Mokpo	3.44
	동문동	東門洞	South Jeolla	Yeosu	0.90
	한려동	閑麗洞	South Jeolla	Yeosu	0.90
	중앙동	中央洞	South Jeolla	Yeosu	0.50
	충무동	忠武洞	South Jeolla	Yeosu	1.40
	광림동	光林洞	South Jeolla	Yeosu	3.40
	서강동	西崗洞	South Jeolla	Yeosu	0.70
	대교동	大橋洞	South Jeolla	Yeosu	1.60
	국동	菊洞	South Jeolla	Yeosu	1.50
	월호동	月湖洞	South Jeolla	Yeosu	6.80
	여서동	麗西洞	South Jeolla	Yeosu	2.60
	문수동	文水洞	South Jeolla	Yeosu	2.30
	미평동	美坪洞	South Jeolla	Yeosu	3.10
	둔덕동	屯德洞	South Jeolla	Yeosu	4.10
	만덕동	萬德洞	South Jeolla	Yeosu	15.80
	쌍봉동	雙鳳洞	South Jeolla	Yeosu	7.20
	시전동	枾田洞	South Jeolla	Yeosu	6.10
	여천동	麗川洞	South Jeolla	Yeosu	7.50
	주삼동	珠三洞	South Jeolla	Yeosu	11.50
	삼일동	三日洞	South Jeolla	Yeosu	66.80
	묘도동	猫島洞	South Jeolla	Yeosu	11.50
	향동	鄕洞	South Jeolla	Suncheon	18.67
	매곡동	梅谷洞	South Jeolla	Suncheon	1.42
	삼산동	三山洞	South Jeolla	Suncheon	17.72
	조곡동	稠谷洞	South Jeolla	Suncheon	2.15
	덕연동	德蓮洞	South Jeolla	Suncheon	5.11
	풍덕동	豊德洞	South Jeolla	Suncheon	2.98
	남제동	南蹄洞	South Jeolla	Suncheon	2.56
	저전동	楮田洞	South Jeolla	Suncheon	0.97
	장천동	長泉洞	South Jeolla	Suncheon	0.47
	중앙동	中央洞	South Jeolla	Suncheon	0.50
	도사동	道沙洞	South Jeolla	Suncheon	25.4
	왕조1동	旺照1洞	South Jeolla	Suncheon	9.41
	왕조2동	旺照2洞	South Jeolla	Suncheon	1.29
	송월동	松月洞	South Jeolla	Naju	4.73
	영강동	榮江洞	South Jeolla	Naju	6.94
	금남동	錦南洞	South Jeolla	Naju	11.58
	성북동	城北洞	South Jeolla	Naju	8.07
	영산동	榮山洞	South Jeolla	Naju	14.06
	이창동	二倉洞	South Jeolla	Naju	15.55
	빛가람동	洞	South Jeolla	Naju	7.33
	골약동	骨若洞	South Jeolla	Gwangyang	35.62
	중마동	中馬洞	South Jeolla	Gwangyang	9.82
	광영동	廣英洞	South Jeolla	Gwangyang	3.25
	태인동	太仁洞	South Jeolla	Gwangyang	6.10
	금호동	金湖洞	South Jeolla	Gwangyang	18.34

=== North Gyeongsang ===
Neighborhood	Korean	Hanja	Provincial	Municipal	Area
	중앙동	中央洞	North Gyeongsang	Pohang (Buk)	2.33
	양학동	良鶴洞	North Gyeongsang	Pohang (Buk)	1.98
	죽도동	竹島洞	North Gyeongsang	Pohang (Buk)	1.86
	용흥동	龍興洞	North Gyeongsang	Pohang (Buk)	3.95
	우창동	牛昌洞	North Gyeongsang	Pohang (Buk)	6.20
	두호동	斗湖洞	North Gyeongsang	Pohang (Buk)	1.38
	장량동	長良洞	North Gyeongsang	Pohang (Buk)	11.18
	환여동	環汝洞	North Gyeongsang	Pohang (Buk)	2.37
	상대동	上大洞	North Gyeongsang	Pohang (Nam)	3.44
	해도동	海島洞	North Gyeongsang	Pohang (Nam)	1.94
	송도동	松島洞	North Gyeongsang	Pohang (Nam)	1.86
	청림동	靑林洞	North Gyeongsang	Pohang (Nam)	6.74
	제철동	製鐵洞	North Gyeongsang	Pohang (Nam)	19.56
	효곡동	孝谷洞	North Gyeongsang	Pohang (Nam)	5.86
	대이동	大梨洞	North Gyeongsang	Pohang (Nam)	4.94
	중부동	中部洞	North Gyeongsang	Gyeongju	0.93
	황오동	皇吾洞	North Gyeongsang	Gyeongju	1.33
	성건동	城乾洞	North Gyeongsang	Gyeongju	6.44
	황남동	皇南洞	North Gyeongsang	Gyeongju	22.16
	선도동	仙桃洞	North Gyeongsang	Gyeongju	28.02
	월성동	月城洞	North Gyeongsang	Gyeongju	31.37
	용강동	龍江洞	North Gyeongsang	Gyeongju	5.06
	황성동	皇城洞	North Gyeongsang	Gyeongju	3.84
	동천동	東川洞	North Gyeongsang	Gyeongju	5.26
	불국동	佛國洞	North Gyeongsang	Gyeongju	37.26
	보덕동	普德洞	North Gyeongsang	Gyeongju	80.96
	자산동	紫山洞	North Gyeongsang	Gimcheon	1.34
	평화남산동	平和南山洞	North Gyeongsang	Gimcheon	2.27
	양금동	陽金洞	North Gyeongsang	Gimcheon	9.22
	대신동	大新洞	North Gyeongsang	Gimcheon	23.45
	대곡동	大谷洞	North Gyeongsang	Gimcheon	13.93
	지좌동	智佐洞	North Gyeongsang	Gimcheon	9.99
	율곡동	栗谷洞	North Gyeongsang	Gimcheon	4.30
	중구동	中區洞	North Gyeongsang	Andong	3.88
	명륜동	明倫洞	North Gyeongsang	Andong	8.01
	용상동	龍上洞	North Gyeongsang	Andong	26.10
	서구동	西區洞	North Gyeongsang	Andong	1.56
	태화동	太華洞	North Gyeongsang	Andong	2.31
	평화동	平和洞	North Gyeongsang	Andong	0.85
	안기동	安奇洞	North Gyeongsang	Andong	7.29
	옥동	玉洞	North Gyeongsang	Andong	4.43
	송하동	松下洞	North Gyeongsang	Andong	9.65
	강남동	江南洞	North Gyeongsang	Andong	20.03
	형곡1동	荊谷1洞	North Gyeongsang	Gumi	2.30
	형곡2동	荊谷2洞	North Gyeongsang	Gumi	2.56
	신평1동	新坪1洞	North Gyeongsang	Gumi	1.18
	신평2동	新坪2洞	North Gyeongsang	Gumi	0.30
	비산동	飛山洞	North Gyeongsang	Gumi	1.63
	공단1동	工團1洞	North Gyeongsang	Gumi	4.59
	공단2동	工團2洞	North Gyeongsang	Gumi	7.94
	광평동	廣坪洞	North Gyeongsang	Gumi	1.83
	상모사곡동	上毛沙谷洞	North Gyeongsang	Gumi	5.72
	임오동	林烏洞	North Gyeongsang	Gumi	6.99
	인동동	仁同洞	North Gyeongsang	Gumi	20.53
	진미동	眞美洞	North Gyeongsang	Gumi	8.72
	양포동	陽浦洞	North Gyeongsang	Gumi	21.83
	상망동	上望洞	North Gyeongsang	Yeongju	15.78
	하망동	下望洞	North Gyeongsang	Yeongju	2.55
	영주1동	榮州1洞	North Gyeongsang	Yeongju	1.02
	영주2동	榮州2洞	North Gyeongsang	Yeongju	0.49
	휴천1동	休川1洞	North Gyeongsang	Yeongju	5.24
	휴천2동	休川2洞	North Gyeongsang	Yeongju	0.88
	휴천3동	休川3洞	North Gyeongsang	Yeongju	10.32
	가흥1동	可興1洞	North Gyeongsang	Yeongju	7.08
	가흥2동	可興2洞	North Gyeongsang	Yeongju	17.12
	동부동	東部洞	North Gyeongsang	Yeongcheon	10.76
	중앙동	中央洞	North Gyeongsang	Yeongcheon	20.44
	서부동	西部洞	North Gyeongsang	Yeongcheon	16.64
	완산동	完山洞	North Gyeongsang	Yeongcheon	5.07
	남부동	南部洞	North Gyeongsang	Yeongcheon	27.17
	남원동	南院洞	North Gyeongsang	Sangju	27.83
	북문동	北門洞	North Gyeongsang	Sangju	14.44
	계림동	溪林洞	North Gyeongsang	Sangju	11.76
	동문동	東門洞	North Gyeongsang	Sangju	18.14
	동성동	東城洞	North Gyeongsang	Sangju	11.78
	신흥동	新興洞	North Gyeongsang	Sangju	25.77
	점촌1동	店村1洞	North Gyeongsang	Mungyeong	0.87
	점촌2동	店村2洞	North Gyeongsang	Mungyeong	4.58
	점촌3동	店村3洞	North Gyeongsang	Mungyeong	8.94
	점촌4동	店村4洞	North Gyeongsang	Mungyeong	29.60
	점촌5동	店村5洞	North Gyeongsang	Mungyeong	2.09
	중앙동	中央洞	North Gyeongsang	Gyeongsan	0.83
	동부동	東部洞	North Gyeongsang	Gyeongsan	18.46
	서부1동	西部1洞	North Gyeongsang	Gyeongsan	5.64
	서부2동	西部2洞	North Gyeongsang	Gyeongsan	1.49
	남부동	南部洞	North Gyeongsang	Gyeongsan	3.74
	북부동	北部洞	North Gyeongsang	Gyeongsan	9.10
	중방동	中方洞	North Gyeongsang	Gyeongsan	1.24

=== South Gyeongsang ===
Neighborhood	Korean	Hanja	Provincial	Municipal	Area
	현동	顯洞	South Gyeongsang	Changwon (Masanhappo)	19.51
	가포동	架浦洞	South Gyeongsang	Changwon (Masanhappo)	4.47
	월영동	月影洞	South Gyeongsang	Changwon (Masanhappo)	2.62
	문화동	文化洞	South Gyeongsang	Changwon (Masanhappo)	1.71
	반월동	半月洞	South Gyeongsang	Changwon (Masanhappo)	0.68
	중앙동	中央洞	South Gyeongsang	Changwon (Masanhappo)	0.35
	완월동	琓月洞	South Gyeongsang	Changwon (Masanhappo)	2.73
	자산동	玆山洞	South Gyeongsang	Changwon (Masanhappo)	1.16
	동서동	東西洞	South Gyeongsang	Changwon (Masanhappo)	1.01
	성호동	城湖洞	South Gyeongsang	Changwon (Masanhappo)	0.31
	교방동	校坊洞	South Gyeongsang	Changwon (Masanhappo)	2.35
	노산동	鷺山洞	South Gyeongsang	Changwon (Masanhappo)	0.38
	오동동	午東洞	South Gyeongsang	Changwon (Masanhappo)	0.44
	합포동	合浦洞	South Gyeongsang	Changwon (Masanhappo)	0.66
	산호동	山湖洞	South Gyeongsang	Changwon (Masanhappo)	0.76
	회원1동	檜原1洞	South Gyeongsang	Changwon (Masanhoewon)	0.73
	회원2동	檜原2洞	South Gyeongsang	Changwon (Masanhoewon)	3.36
	석전1동	石田1洞	South Gyeongsang	Changwon (Masanhoewon)	0.71
	석전2동	石田2洞	South Gyeongsang	Changwon (Masanhoewon)	0.90
	회성동	檜城洞	South Gyeongsang	Changwon (Masanhoewon)	9.55
	양덕1동	陽德1洞	South Gyeongsang	Changwon (Masanhoewon)	0.77
	양덕2동	陽德2洞	South Gyeongsang	Changwon (Masanhoewon)	1.73
	합성1동	合城1洞	South Gyeongsang	Changwon (Masanhoewon)	5.78
	합성2동	合城2洞	South Gyeongsang	Changwon (Masanhoewon)	1.93
	구암1동	龜岩1洞	South Gyeongsang	Changwon (Masanhoewon)	2.38
	구암2동	龜岩2洞	South Gyeongsang	Changwon (Masanhoewon)	0.74
	봉암동	鳳岩洞	South Gyeongsang	Changwon (Masanhoewon)	6.16
	반송동	盤松洞	South Gyeongsang	Changwon (Seongsan)	2.06
	중앙동	中央洞	South Gyeongsang	Changwon (Seongsan)	4.87
	상남동	上南洞	South Gyeongsang	Changwon (Seongsan)	1.14
	사파동	沙巴洞	South Gyeongsang	Changwon (Seongsan)	8.06
	가음정동	加音丁洞	South Gyeongsang	Changwon (Seongsan)	2.89
	성주동	聖住洞	South Gyeongsang	Changwon (Seongsan)	24.94
	웅남동	熊南洞	South Gyeongsang	Changwon (Seongsan)	38.13
	의창동	義昌洞	South Gyeongsang	Changwon (Uichang)	8.24
	팔룡동	八龍洞	South Gyeongsang	Changwon (Uichang)	14.28
	명곡동	明谷洞	South Gyeongsang	Changwon (Uichang)	6.62
	봉림동	鳳林洞	South Gyeongsang	Changwon (Uichang)	12.18
	용지동	龍池洞	South Gyeongsang	Changwon (Uichang)	2.65
	중앙동	中央洞	South Gyeongsang	Changwon (Jinhae)	12.63
	태평동	太平洞	South Gyeongsang	Changwon (Jinhae)	4.58
	충무동	忠武洞	South Gyeongsang	Changwon (Jinhae)	0.86
	여좌동	餘佐洞	South Gyeongsang	Changwon (Jinhae)	4.54
	태백동	太白洞	South Gyeongsang	Changwon (Jinhae)	1.77
	경화동	慶和洞	South Gyeongsang	Changwon (Jinhae)	2.12
	병암동	屛岩洞	South Gyeongsang	Changwon (Jinhae)	1.71
	석동	石洞	South Gyeongsang	Changwon (Jinhae)	2.24
	이동	泥洞	South Gyeongsang	Changwon (Jinhae)	0.91
	자은동	自隱洞	South Gyeongsang	Changwon (Jinhae)	6.11
	덕산동	德山洞	South Gyeongsang	Changwon (Jinhae)	2.04
	풍호동	豊湖洞	South Gyeongsang	Changwon (Jinhae)	7.38
	웅천동	熊川洞	South Gyeongsang	Changwon (Jinhae)	27.78
	웅동1동	熊東1洞	South Gyeongsang	Changwon (Jinhae)	32.75
	웅동2동	熊東2洞	South Gyeongsang	Changwon (Jinhae)	12.72
	동상동	東上洞	South Gyeongsang	Gimhae	1.80
	회현동	會峴洞	South Gyeongsang	Gimhae	1.14
	부원동	府院洞	South Gyeongsang	Gimhae	2.06
	내외동	內外洞	South Gyeongsang	Gimhae	5.33
	북부동	北部洞	South Gyeongsang	Gimhae	13.94
	칠산서부동	七山西部洞	South Gyeongsang	Gimhae	20.04
	활천동	活川洞	South Gyeongsang	Gimhae	5.88
	삼안동	三安洞	South Gyeongsang	Gimhae	11.29
	불암동	佛岩洞	South Gyeongsang	Gimhae	2.59
	장유1동	長有1洞	South Gyeongsang	Gimhae	54.57
	장유2동	長有2洞	South Gyeongsang	Gimhae	?.??
	장유3동	長有3洞	South Gyeongsang	Gimhae	?.??
	천전동	川前洞	South Gyeongsang	Jinju	6.46
	성북동	城北洞	South Gyeongsang	Jinju	1.16
	중앙동	中央洞	South Gyeongsang	Jinju	2.04
	상봉동	上鳳洞	South Gyeongsang	Jinju	2.62
	상대1동	上大1洞	South Gyeongsang	Jinju	1.49
	상대2동	上大2洞	South Gyeongsang	Jinju	1.70
	하대1동	下大1洞	South Gyeongsang	Jinju	2.21
	하대2동	下大2洞	South Gyeongsang	Jinju	0.74
	상평동	上坪洞	South Gyeongsang	Jinju	3.05
	초장동	草長洞	South Gyeongsang	Jinju	12.26
	평거동	平居洞	South Gyeongsang	Jinju	2.92
	신안동	新安洞	South Gyeongsang	Jinju	1.00
	이현동	二峴洞	South Gyeongsang	Jinju	5.80
	판문동	板門洞	South Gyeongsang	Jinju	17.38
	가호동	加虎洞	South Gyeongsang	Jinju	9.50
	충무공동	忠武公洞	South Gyeongsang	Jinju	4.07
	중앙동	中央洞	South Gyeongsang	Yangsan	11.91
	양주동	梁州洞	South Gyeongsang	Yangsan	1.87
	삼성동	三城洞	South Gyeongsang	Yangsan	15.98
	강서동	江西洞	South Gyeongsang	Yangsan	29.79
	서창동	西倉洞	South Gyeongsang	Yangsan	22.00
	소주동	召周洞	South Gyeongsang	Yangsan	18.39
	평산동	平山洞	South Gyeongsang	Yangsan	10.75
	덕계동	德溪洞	South Gyeongsang	Yangsan	13.37
	고현동	古縣洞	South Gyeongsang	Geoje	5.14
	상문동	上門洞	South Gyeongsang	Geoje	20.97
	수양동	水良洞	South Gyeongsang	Geoje	11.15
	장평동	長坪洞	South Gyeongsang	Geoje	6.98
	능포동	菱浦洞	South Gyeongsang	Geoje	3.21
	마전동	麻田洞	South Gyeongsang	Geoje	1.92
	아주동	鵝州洞	South Gyeongsang	Geoje	12.45
	옥포1동	玉浦1洞	South Gyeongsang	Geoje	2.26
	옥포2동	玉浦2洞	South Gyeongsang	Geoje	8.61
	장승포동	長承浦洞	South Gyeongsang	Geoje	2.15
	도천동	道泉洞	South Gyeongsang	Tongyeong	6.45
	명정동	明井洞	South Gyeongsang	Tongyeong	3.95
	중앙동	中央洞	South Gyeongsang	Tongyeong	0.67
	정량동	貞梁洞	South Gyeongsang	Tongyeong	1.98
	북신동	北新洞	South Gyeongsang	Tongyeong	1.05
	무전동	霧田洞	South Gyeongsang	Tongyeong	1.84
	미수동	美修洞	South Gyeongsang	Tongyeong	2.48
	봉평동	鳳坪洞	South Gyeongsang	Tongyeong	3.79
	동서동	東西洞	South Gyeongsang	Sacheon	9.73
	선구동	仙龜洞	South Gyeongsang	Sacheon	3.38
	동서금동	東西錦洞	South Gyeongsang	Sacheon	0.95
	벌용동	閥龍洞	South Gyeongsang	Sacheon	9.71
	향촌동	香村洞	South Gyeongsang	Sacheon	12.4
	남양동	南陽洞	South Gyeongsang	Sacheon	23.3
	내일동	內一洞	South Gyeongsang	Miryang	12.07
	내이동	內二洞	South Gyeongsang	Miryang	3.06
	교동	校洞	South Gyeongsang	Miryang	4.61
	삼문동	三門洞	South Gyeongsang	Miryang	2.93
	가곡동	駕谷洞	South Gyeongsang	Miryang	6.21

=== Jeju ===
Neighborhood	Korean	Hanja	Provincial	Municipal	Area
Geonip	건입동	健入洞	Jeju	Jeju	2.53
Nohyeong	노형동	老衡洞	Jeju	Jeju	45.24
Dodu	도두동	道頭洞	Jeju	Jeju	4.03
Bonggae	봉개동	奉蓋洞	Jeju	Jeju	47.34
Samdo 1	삼도1동	三徒1洞	Jeju	Jeju	1.27
Samdo 2	삼도2동	三徒2洞	Jeju	Jeju	0.83
Samyang	삼양동	三陽洞	Jeju	Jeju	9.53
Ara	아라동	我羅洞	Jeju	Jeju	70.64
Yeon	연동	連洞	Jeju	Jeju	12.32
Ora	오라동	吾羅洞	Jeju	Jeju	28.74
Oedo	외도동	外都洞	Jeju	Jeju	8.40
Yongdam 1	용담1동	龍潭1洞	Jeju	Jeju	0.61
Yongdam 2	용담2동	龍潭2洞	Jeju	Jeju	4.93
Ido 1	이도1동	二徒1洞	Jeju	Jeju	0.69
Ido 2	이도2동	二徒2洞	Jeju	Jeju	5.40
Iho	이호동	梨湖洞	Jeju	Jeju	2.56
Ildo 1	일도1동	一徒1洞	Jeju	Jeju	0.33
Ildo 2	일도2동	一徒2洞	Jeju	Jeju	2.18
Hwabuk	화북동	禾北洞	Jeju	Jeju	8.29
Daeryun	대륜동	大倫洞	Jeju	Seogwipo	22.24
Daecheon	대천동	大川洞	Jeju	Seogwipo	50.50
Donghong	동홍동	東烘洞	Jeju	Seogwipo	14.30
Seohong	서홍동	西烘洞	Jeju	Seogwipo	14.71
Songsan	송산동	松山洞	Jeju	Seogwipo	4.80
Yeongcheon	영천동	靈泉洞	Jeju	Seogwipo	46.33
Yerae	예래동	猊來洞	Jeju	Seogwipo	37.30
Jeongbang	정방동	正房洞	Jeju	Seogwipo	0.44
Jungmun	중문동	中文洞	Jeju	Seogwipo	56.44
Jungang	중앙동	中央洞	Jeju	Seogwipo	0.35
Cheonji	천지동	天地洞	Jeju	Seogwipo	1.39
Hyodon	효돈동	孝敦洞	Jeju	Seogwipo	6.60

== See also ==
- Administrative divisions of South Korea
