= List of districts of Seoul =

Overview of autonomous districts of Seoul

Districts of Seoul Special Metropolitan City
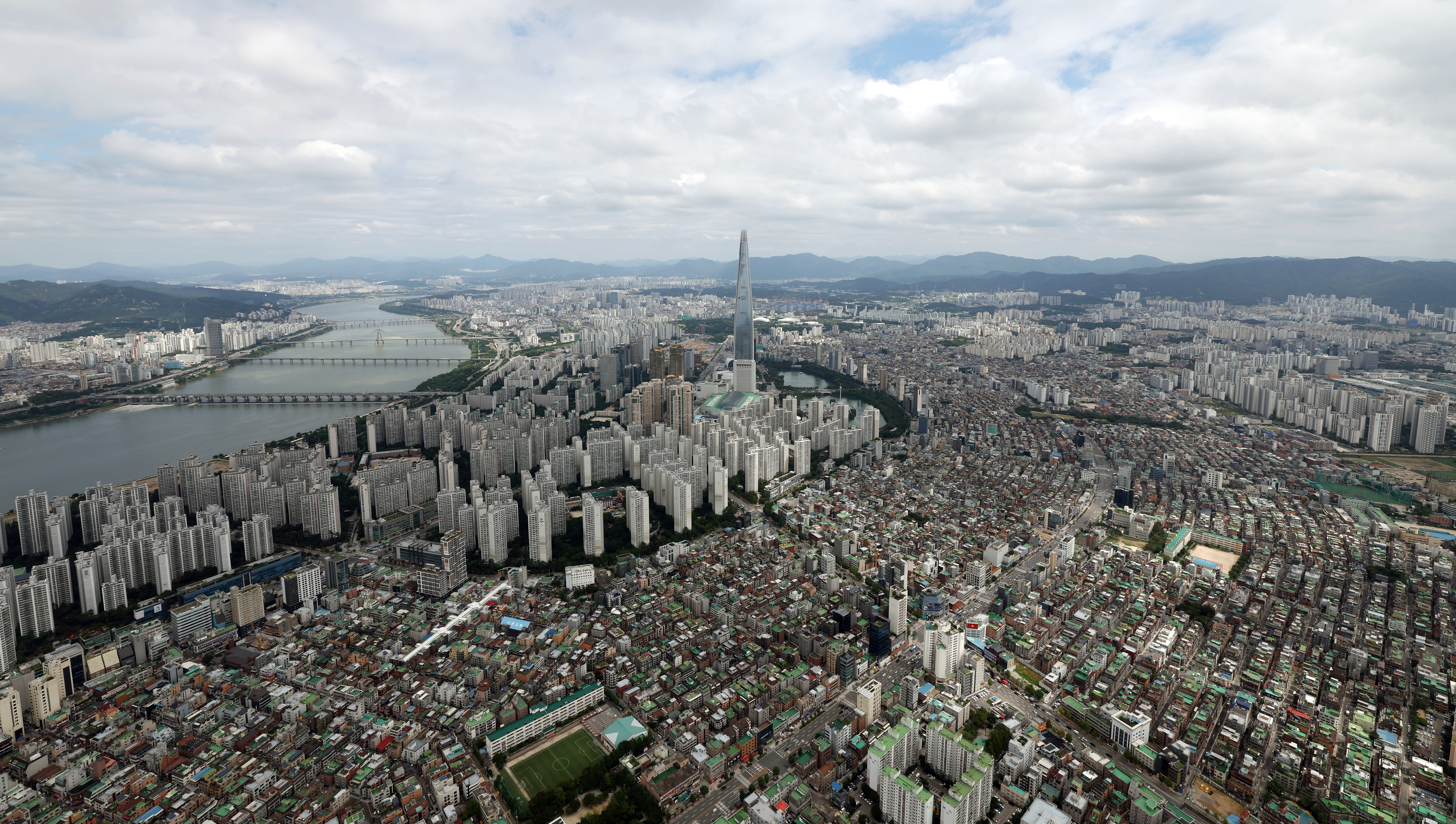
- Songpa-gu, Seoul's largest district by population

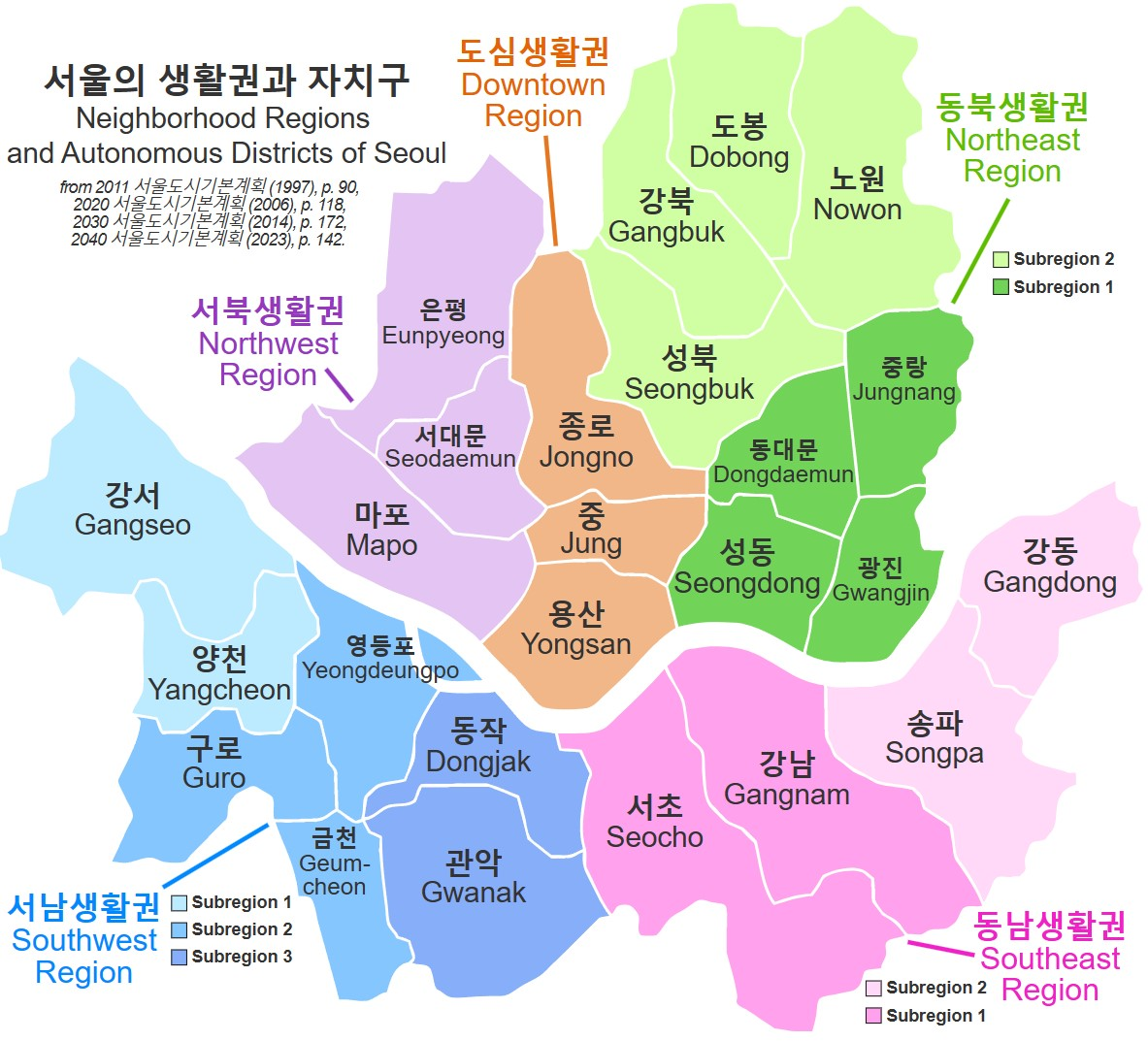
- Map of the districts of Seoul
- Country: South Korea
- Region: Sudogwon
- Districts: 25
- Subdivisions: 467
- Electoral constituencies: 48

Area
  - Total: 605.21 km^{2} (233.67 sq mi)

Population (2023)
  - Total: 9,659,322
  - Density: 16,000/km^{2} (41,000/sq mi)

The districts of Seoul are the twenty-five gu (districts; Korean: 구; Hanja: 區) comprising Seoul, South Korea. The gu vary greatly in area (from 10 to 47 km^{2}) and population (from less than 140,000 to 630,000), fourteen of which are located north of the Han River, and eleven south. Songpa District is the most populated, while Seocho District has the largest area. Gu are similar to London's or New York's boroughs or Tokyo's 23 special wards. Each gu's government handles many of the functions that are handled by city governments in other jurisdictions. This city-like standing is underscored by the fact that each gu has its own legislative council, mayor and sister cities. Each gu is further divided into dong or neighborhoods. Some gu have only a few dong while others (like Jongno District) have a very large number of distinct neighborhoods. Districts of Seoul form a total of 467 legal-status subdivisions.

Jongno-gu, with Dongdaemun famous for its fashion markets, and Jung-gu, form the historic and administrative core of the city, housing palaces, government buildings, cultural sites, and hosting major landmarks like the N Seoul Tower. Yongsan-gu, located just south of central Seoul but still north of the river, is known for Itaewon's international scene. The district also hosts a sizeable amount of the country's foreign embassies. Seodaemun-gu and Mapo-gu are home to Yonsei University, Sogang University, and Hongdae, a hub of youth culture and nightlife. Eunpyeong-gu, Dobong-gu, Nowon-gu, bordered by the Suraksan and Bukhansan mountains to the north, and Gangbuk-gu, are in the northernmost part of the city, offering residential areas and access to Bukhansan National Park. Seongbuk-gu, home of Korea University, and Jungnang-gu, blend traditional neighborhoods with modern infrastructure. Dongdaemun-gu and Seongdong-gu are growing commercial and residential districts.

Gangnam-gu, one of the most significant districts of Seoul, home to many of the country's corporations and businesses, Seocho-gu, the largest district by land area, and Songpa-gu, are among the most affluent areas, with Seocho housing legal institutions, and Songpa featuring major attractions like Lotte World and the Lotte World Tower, one of the tallest buildings in the world. Gwangjin-gu, located along the river, is known for its vibrant university district and shopping centers. Geumcheon-gu, in the southwest, is one of the smaller districts of the city, bordered by the Anyangcheon to the west. Yangcheon-gu, home to some of the tallest residential buildings in the city, Gangseo-gu, Seoul's westernmost district, and Guro-gu in the southwest offer a mix of residential and industrial zones, with Gangseo home to Gimpo International Airport and Guro being an IT hub. Yeongdeungpo-gu and Dongjak-gu are key financial and transportation centers, with Yeongdeungpo hosting major corporate offices and Dongjak known for its universities and military facilities.

== History ==
At the time of national independence in 1945, Seoul was a rapidly growing city, divided into 8 districts (gu) and 268 neighborhoods (dong). In 1949, the city's administrative limits expanded exponentially to 268.353 km^{2}, roughly doubling its size from 1945. This was driven by the need to accommodate rapid population growth and urbanization after independence. With the realignments of si (cities), do (provinces), gu (districts), and gun (counties), the jurisdiction included 45 ri-districts, such as Sungin-myeon, Dokdo-myeon, Eunpyeong-myeon, and Siheung-gun, and Dong-myeon of Goyang-si, Gyeonggi Province. Seongbuk-gu was also included in the original eight, bringing a total of nine, as Seoul Metropolitan Government organization continued to advance to address the city's rapid expansion. When the city kept growing, Seoul annexed 5 gun (counties) and 84 ri-districts in 1963, significantly increasing its administrative area. The city's total area was 595.50 km^{2}, and the population was 2.59 million.

It grew again in 1973 when Seoul incorporated additional territory, including Gupabal-ri, Jingwannae-ri, and Jingwanoe-ri of Goyang-gun, Gyeonggi-do. It raised the overall area of Seoul to 605.33 km^{2}. That year, the administrative districts were once again reorganized, and Gwanak-gu and Dobong-gu were officially declared districts. This increased the number of districts to 11 from 9. As city expansion in Seoul gained momentum, the need for more administrative divisions became more apparent. Gangnam-gu emerged in 1975, increasing the number of districts to 12. The establishment of Gangnam-gu was particularly significant as it marked the beginning of Seoul's expansion south of the Han River, which paved the way for what would become one of the city's most affluent and lively districts. By 1977, another expansion formed Gangseo-gu, increasing the number of districts to 13. This was then followed in 1979 by the establishment of Eunpyeong-gu and Gangdong-gu, increasing the number to 15 districts.

The 1980s also saw additional administrative restructuring with the creation of Guro-gu and Dongjak-gu, bringing the total number of districts to 17. Seoul's population had grown to 9.2 million by then, a testament to the city's rapid growth into a metropolis. In 1988, extensive administrative restructuring resulted in the establishment of Songpa-gu, Jungnang-gu, Nowon-gu, Seocho-gu, and Yangcheon-gu. This expansion increased the number of districts from 17 to 22. The late 1980s also witnessed Seoul's growing international stature, since it was scheduled to host the 1988 Summer Olympics, which further stimulated urban development and modernization. The most recent major reorganization took place in 1995 when Gangbuk-gu, Geumcheon-gu, and Gwangjin-gu were added, bringing Seoul to 25 districts.

== Politics ==
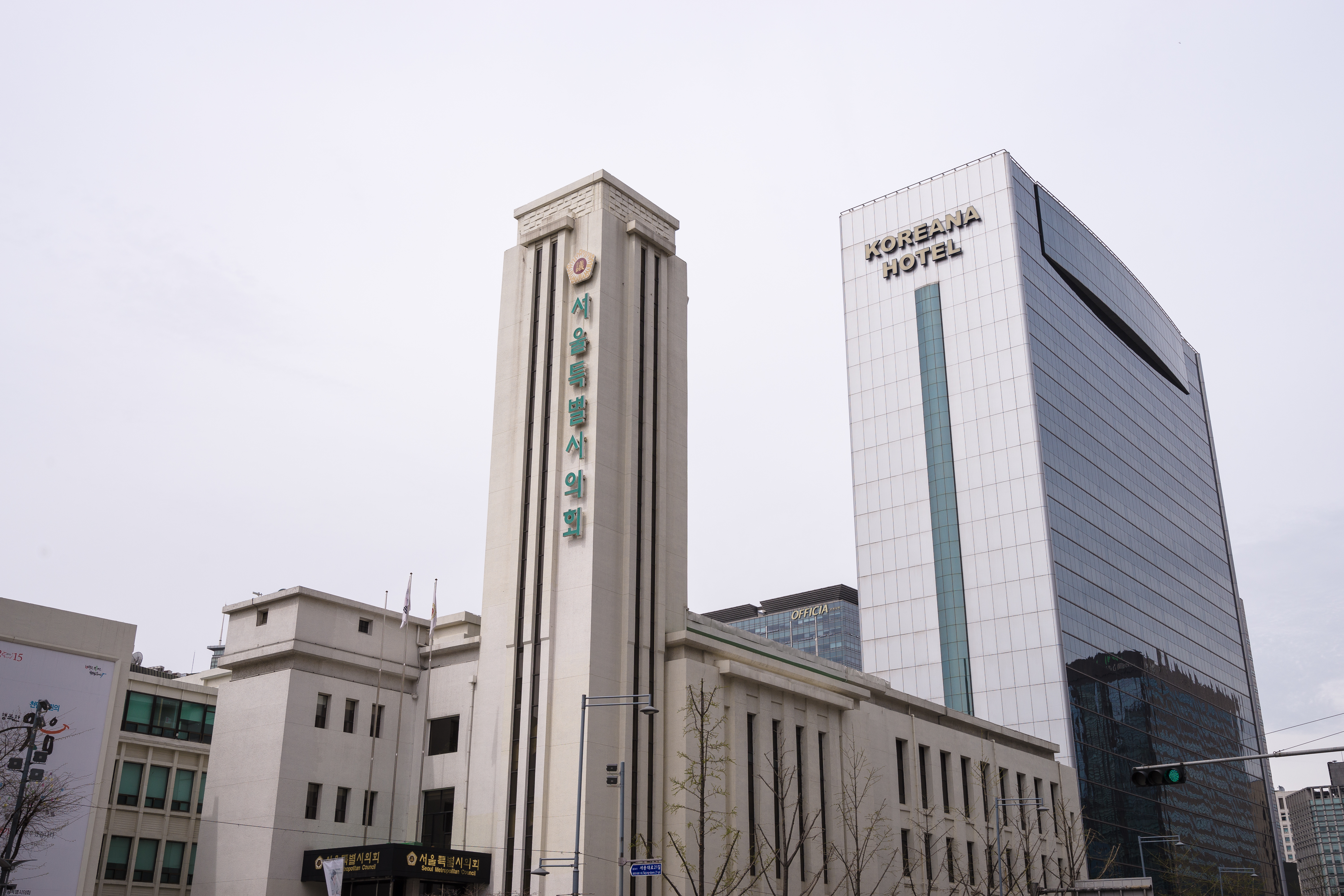
Building of the Seoul Metropolitan Council

The Seoul Metropolitan Council is the legislative body of Seoul, overseeing the city's 25 districts. Council members are elected every four years, with most representing specific districts, while 10 others are elected through proportional representation. The council plays a crucial role in local governance, making decisions on policies, budgets, and legislation that impact the city's administration and development. It consists of standing committees, special committees, and a secretariat, with a chair and two vice-chairs overseeing operations. Council members hold the right to review and approve policies, manage finances, and address residents' petitions. The Seoul Metropolitan Council is empowered to pass ordinances, approve budgets, and review city policies and affairs. Standing committees focus on specific areas like public safety, housing, and transportation, while special committees address urgent city matters or ethical concerns. The council also plays a role in ensuring transparency and citizen participation, organizing public hearings and collecting public opinions on city issues. Members of the Council hold significant power to decide on policy, legislation, residents' complaints, and city affairs related to the Seoul Metropolitan Government and the Seoul Metropolitan Office of Education. They make use of such rights in a wide range of ways, ranging from ordinances, voting, to approval processes. The council can enact, amend, and repeal ordinances, examine and approve budget proposals, approve or disapprove final accounts, and impose and collect local taxes and fees outside the purview of national laws. The council further handles funds, purchases and sells principal properties, installs and removes public installations, and listens to petitions from the people regarding municipal affairs.

The Seoul Metropolitan Council also possesses the power to exercise control over the executive branch (the SMG and Seoul Metropolitan Office of Education) to monitor and correct its actions. This includes calling for attendance, answers, or opinions from the mayor or superintendent, calling for documents, auditing, and investigating administrative affairs. The council may address petitions that are brought up by citizens or other parties having interests in Seoul, complaining about or requesting improvements in city administration. Petitions may involve affairs such as damage relief, penalty against corrupt officials, promulgation or abolition of laws and regulations, administration of public facilities, and other affairs. The Seoul Metropolitan Council also has the power to select its own rules of procedure, regulate meetings, and construct its organization. It is also empowered to determine the legal status of council members and regulate internal affairs independently. With these responsibilities and rights, the Seoul Metropolitan Council has an extremely crucial role in determining Seoul's administration and growth, where the people may provide their inputs in decisions that affect their daily life and the future of the city.

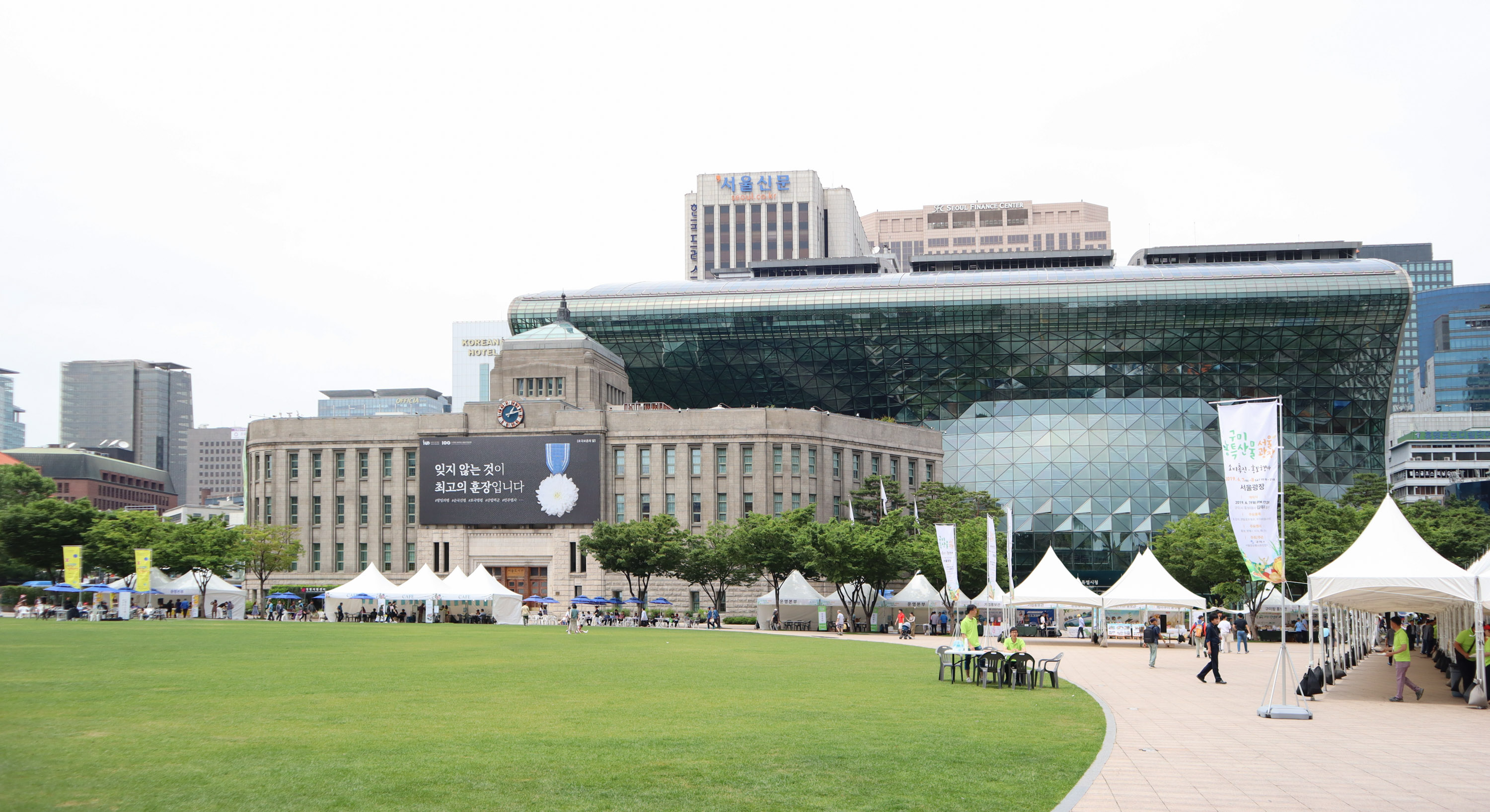
Seoul City Hall serves as the headquarters for the Seoul Metropolitan Government

The Seoul Metropolitan Government, the executive branch, works alongside the Seoul Metropolitan Council. The mayor of Seoul and the mayors of each district serve four-year terms, with vice mayors and various directors of bureaus, offices, and divisions working under them. The dongs, or neighborhoods, provide direct services to residents within their respective areas. The Seoul Metropolitan Government is directly under the jurisdiction of the Prime Minister, with the Seoul Mayor holding a privileged government position and able to report city affairs at cabinet meetings. The status of civil servants within the Seoul Metropolitan Government, including key positions such as the director general of planning and coordination and the heads of bureaus, was elevated by one tier. The Seoul Metropolitan Government oversees several key locations within its jurisdiction, which serve as the administrative centers for the city's operations. These locations include the Seoul City Hall, which serves as the base of operations of the local government, Seoul City Hall Seosomun Building, Seoul City Hall Seosomun Building 2, Seoul City Hall Namsan Building, Seoul City Hall Mugyo-dong Building, Seoul City Hall Cheonggyecheonro Building, and the Press Center.

== List by population and area ==
2014 estimate by Seoul Statistics.

Flag	Name	Korean	Population	Area	Population density
	Dobong District	도봉구; 道峰區	355,712	20.70 km^{2}	17184/km^{2}
	Dongdaemun District	동대문구; 東大門區	376,319	14.21 km^{2}	26483/km^{2}
	Dongjak District	동작구; 銅雀區	419,261	16.35 km^{2}	25643/km^{2}
	Eunpyeong District	은평구; 恩平區	503,243	29.70 km^{2}	16944/km^{2}
	Gangbuk District	강북구; 江北區	338,410	23.60 km^{2}	14339/km^{2}
	Gangdong District	강동구; 江東區	481,332	24.59 km^{2}	19574/km^{2}
	Gangnam District	강남구; 江南區	583,446	39.50 km^{2}	14771/km^{2}
	Gangseo District	강서구; 江西區	591,653	41.43 km^{2}	14281/km^{2}
	Geumcheon District	금천구; 衿川區	258,030	13.02 km^{2}	19818/km^{2}
	Guro District	구로구; 九老區	457,131	20.12 km^{2}	22720/km^{2}
	Gwanak District	관악구; 冠岳區	531,960	29.57 km^{2}	17990/km^{2}
	Gwangjin District	광진구; 廣津區	377,375	17.06 km^{2}	22120/km^{2}
	Jongno District	종로구; 鍾路區	165,344	23.91 km^{2}	6915/km^{2}
	Jung District	중구; 中區	136,227	9.96 km^{2}	13677/km^{2}
	Jungnang District	중랑구; 中浪區	423,411	18.50 km^{2}	22887/km^{2}
	Mapo District	마포구; 麻浦區	395,830	23.84 km^{2}	16604/km^{2}
	Nowon District	노원구; 蘆原區	586,056	35.44 km^{2}	16536/km^{2}
	Seocho District	서초구; 瑞草區	454,288	47.00 km^{2}	9666/km^{2}
	Seodaemun District	서대문구; 西大門區	320,861	17.61 km^{2}	18220/km^{2}
	Seongbuk District	성북구; 城北區	475,961	24.58 km^{2}	19364/km^{2}
	Seongdong District	성동구; 城東區	303,891	16.86 km^{2}	19364/km^{2}
	Songpa District	송파구; 松坡區	671,794	33.88 km^{2}	19829/km^{2}
	Yangcheon District	양천구; 陽川區	490,708	17.40 km^{2}	28202/km^{2}
	Yeongdeungpo District	영등포구; 永登浦區	421,436	24.53 km^{2}	17180/km^{2}
	Yongsan District	용산구; 龍山區	249,914	21.87 km^{2}	11427/km^{2}
Seoul		서울	10,369,593	605.21 km^{2}	17134/km^{2}

== General information ==
Name	Dong	Points of Interest	Image	Location
Dobong District	Dobong-dong; Banghak-dong; Ssangmun-dong; Chang-dong	Dobongsan		
Dongdaemun District	Cheongnyangni-dong; Dapsimni-dong; Hoegi-dong; Hwigyeong-dong; Imun-dong; Jegi-dong; Jangan-dong; Jeonnong-dong; Sinseol-dong; Yongdu-dong	Dongdaemun Design Plaza; Cheongnyangni Station; Gyeongdong Market; Hongneung Arboretum		
Dongjak District	Bon-dong; Daebang-dong; Dongjak-dong; Heukseok-dong; Noryangjin-dong; Sadang-dong; Sangdo-dong; Sindaebang-dong	Seoul National Cemetery; Noryangjin Fish Market; Boramae Park; Sayuksin Park		
Eunpyeong District	Bulgwang-dong; Daejo-dong; Eungam-dong; Galhyeon-dong; Gusan-dong; Jeungsan-dong; Jingwan-dong; Nokbeon-dong; Sinsa-dong; Susaek-dong; Yeokchon-dong	Bongsan Park; Gupabal Fall		
Gangbuk District	Mia-dong; Beon-dong; Suyu-dong; Ui-dong	Dream Forest; Bukhansan National Park		
Gangdong District	Gangil-dong; Godeok-dong; Gil-dong; Dunchon-dong; Myeongil-dong; Sangil-dong; Seongnae-dong; Amsa-dong; Cheonho-dong	Saetmaeul Park; Cheonhodong Park; Dunchun-dong Marsh Area; Gildong Ecological Park		
Gangnam District	Apgujeong-dong; Cheongdam-dong; Daechi-dong; Dogok-dong; Gaepo-dong; Irwon-dong; Jagok-dong; Nonhyeon-dong; Samseong-dong; Segok-dong; Sinsa-dong; Suseo-dong; Yeoksam-dong; Yulhyeon-dong	COEX Mall; Teheran-ro; Gangnam station; Bongeunsa Temple; Garosu-gil; Yangjaecheon; Dosan Park; Kukkiwon		
Gangseo District	Banghwa-dong; Deungchon-dong; Gaehwa-dong; Gayang-dong; Gonghang-dong; Gwahae-dong; Hwagok-dong; Magok-dong; Naebalsan-dong; Oebalsan-dong; Ogok-dong; Osoe-dong; Yeomchang-dong	Gimpo International Airport; Heojun Museum; Maewha Park		
Geumcheon District	Gasan-dong; Doksan-dong; Siheung-dong	Anyangcheon		
Guro District	Cheonwang-dong; Gaebong-dong; Garibong-dong; Gocheok-dong; Gung-dong; Guro-dong; Hang-dong; Onsu-dong; Oryu-dong; Sindorim-dong	Gocheok Sky Dome; Pureun Arboretum; Sindorim Station		
Gwanak District	Bongcheon-dong; Namhyeon-dong; Sillim-dong	Seoul National University; Kyujanggak; Gwaneumsa; Nakseongdae; Gwanaksan; Horim Museum		
Gwangjin District	Gunja-dong; Guui-dong; Gwangjang-dong; Hwayang-dong; Jayang-dong; Junggok-dong; Neung-dong	Techno Mart; Achasan Park; Children's Grand Park, Seoul; Dong Seoul Bus Terminal; Ttukseom Resort		
Jongno District	Cheongun-dong; Hyoja-dong; Sajik-dong; Samcheong-dong; Buam-dong; Pyeongchang-dong; Muak-dong; Gyonam-dong; Gahoe-dong; Ihwa-dong; Hyehwa-dong; Sejongno-dong; Jongno-1.2.3.4 ga-dong; Jongno-5.6 ga-dong; Changsin-dong; Sungin-dong	Cheongwadae; Heunginjimun; Dongmyo Park; Gwanghwamun Plaza; Jogyesa; Naksan Park; Gyeongbokgung; Changdeokgung; Cheonggyecheon; Jongmyo; National Folk Museum of Korea; Bukchon Hanok Village		
Jung District	Sogong-dong; Hoehyeon-dong; Myeong-dong; Pil-dong; Jangchung-dong; Gwanghui-dong; Euljiro-dong; Sindang-dong; Dasan-dong; Yaksu-dong; Cheonggu-dong; Sindang 5(o)-dong; Donghwa-dong; Hwanghak-dong; Jungnim-dong	Seoul City Hall; Seoul Station; Deoksugung; Dongdaemun Design Plaza; Namdaemun; Myeongdong; Hwangudan Park; N Seoul Tower; Seoul Museum of Art		
Jungnang District	Junghwa-dong; Mangu-dong; Muk-dong; Myeonmok-dong; Sangbong-dong; Sinnae-dong	Yongma Land; Nadeuri Park		
Mapo District	Ahyeon-dong; Changjeon-dong; Daeheung-dong; Dangin-dong; Dohwa-dong; Donggyo-dong; Gongdeok-dong; Gusu-dong; Hajung-dong; Hapjeong-dong; Hyeonseok-dong; Jung-dong; Mangwon-dong; Mapo-dong; Nogosan-dong; Sangam-dong; Sangsu-dong; Seogyo-dong; Seongsan-dong; Singongdeok-dong; Sinjeong-dong; Sinsu-dong; Tojeong-dong; Yeomni-dong; Yeonnam-dong; Yonggang-dong	Digital Media City; Seoul World Cup Stadium; Hongdae area; Gyeongui Line Forest Park		
Nowon District	Gongneung-dong; Hagye-dong; Junggye-dong; Sanggye-dong; Wolgye-dong	Seoul National University of Technology; Seoul Women's University		
Seocho District	Bangbae-dong; Banpo-dong; Jamwon-dong; Naegok-dong; Seocho-dong; Sinwon-dong; Umyeon-dong; Wonji-dong; Yangjae-dong; Yeomgok-dong	Samsung Town; Yangjae Citizens' Forest; Seoul Arts Center; Seoul Express Bus Terminal; Some Sevit		
Seodaemun District	Daesin-dong; Bongwon-dong; Daehyeon-dong; Sinchon-dong; Bukgajwa-dong; Bugahyeon-dong; Changcheon-dong; Cheonyeon-dong; Hyeonjeo-dong; Naengcheon-dong; Yeongcheon-dong; Okcheon-dong; Chungjeongno-dong; Hap-dong; Migeun-dong; Hongeun-dong; Hongje-dong; Namgajwa-dong; Yeonhui-dong	Bongwonsa; Seodaemun prison; Dongnimmun; Yonsei University; Ewha Womans University; Sinchon; Independence Park		
Seongbuk District	Anam-dong; Bomun-dong; Donam-dong; Dongseon-dong; Dongsomun-dong; Gireum-dong; Jangwi-dong; Jeongneung-dong; Jongam-dong; Samseon-dong; Sangwolgok-dong; Seokgwan-dong; Seongbuk-dong; Wolgok-dong; Hawolgok-dong	Korea University		
Seongdong District	Doseon-dong; Hongik-dong; Eungbong-dong; Haengdang-dong; Geumho-dong; Majang-dong; Oksu-dong; Sageun-dong; Seongsu 1ga 1 dong; Seongsu 1ga 2 dong; Seongsu 2ga 1-dong; Seongsu 2ga 3-dong; Songjeong-dong; Yongdap-dong; Wangsimni-dong; Sangwangsimni-dong; Hawangsimni-dong	Eungbongsan; Seoul Forest; Wangsimni Station		
Songpa District	Bangi-dong; Garak-dong; Geoyeo-dong; Jamsil-dong; Jangji-dong; Macheon-dong; Munjeong-dong; Ogeum-dong; Pungnap-dong; Samjeon-dong; Seokchon-dong; Sincheon-dong; Songpa-dong	Olympic Park; Bangi-dong Marsh Area; Lotte World; Lotte World Tower; Seokchon Lake; Seoul Sports Complex; Garak Market; Tancheon; Wiryeseong		
Yangcheon District	Mok-dong; Sinjeong-dong; Sinwol-dong	Mokdong Stadium; Hyperion Tower; SBS Headquarters; CBS Headquarters		
Yeongdeungpo District	Dangsan-dong; Daerim-dong; Dorim-dong; Mullae-dong; Singil-dong; Yangpyeong-dong; Yeongdeungpo-dong; Yeouido-dong	Bamseom; Yeouido; Yeouido Park; National Assembly of South Korea; Seonyudo; 63 Building; International Financial Center Seoul		
Yongsan District	Cheongpa-dong; Hangangno-dong; Hannam-dong; Huam-dong; Hyochang-dong; Ichon-dong; Itaewon; Namyoung-dong; Seobinggo-dong; Wonhyoro-dong; Yongmun-dong; Yongsan-dong	Itaewon; War Memorial of Korea; National Museum of Korea; Yongsan Electronics Market; Yongsan Garrison; Yongsan Park; Yongsan Station		

== See also ==
- Administrative Divisions of South Korea
- Districts of South Korea
- Special wards of Tokyo
- Boroughs of New York City
- London borough
- Arrondissements of Paris
- Municipalities of the Brussels-Capital Region
- Districts of Madrid
