= Oh Hwa-sup =

South Korean writer (1916–1979)

- 오화섭
- Born: 1916; Incheonbu, Gyeonggi Province, Korea Under Japanese Rule
- Died: May 20, 1979 (aged 62–63); Daesin-dong, Seoul, South Korea
- Education: Waseda University, (B.A, M.A.)
- Occupations: Literary critic, translator, professor, theatrician, and scholar of English Literature
- Spouse(s): Hyung-sun Kim (1958–1979); No-gyeong Park (?–1950)
- Children: Two sons and three daughters, including: Hye-ryeong Oh (오혜령); Se-cheol Oh (오세철)

Oh Hwa-sup (Korean: 오화섭; Korean: [o. hwa. sʌb]; 1916 – May 20, 1979) was a South Korean literary critic, translator, professor, theatrician, and scholar of English literature. Born in Incheon, Oh became a pioneer in English literature studies and is most known for translating many modern American plays into daily Korean vernacular. His translated works include Long Day’s Journey Into Night (1956) by Eugene O’Neill and Who’s Afraid of Virginia Woolf (1962) by Edward Albee. He was the founding member and contributor of Theatre Livre and Women’s Little Theater, co-founded by his first wife. He also was the director of the English Language and Literature Association of Korea (ELLAK) from 1963 to 1965.

== Life ==
=== Formative years (1916–1941) ===
Oh was born in Incheon when Korea was under Japanese rule in 1916. His father, Hyeokgeun Oh (오혁근; 吳赫根) was a village leader and scholar who served as the chair of the Discipline and Qualification Committee of the First Incheon City Council.

Oh graduated from Sorae Public Primary School in 1929 and enrolled in the Joong-dong School in Seoul in 1935. After graduating, he enrolled in the Department of English Language and Literature at Waseda University in Japan, graduating in 1940. In the following year, he graduated from Waseda’s graduate program in the same department.

=== Later years (1941–1979) ===
During his studies in Japan, he met his first wife, No-gyeong Park (박노경), who was the founder of the theater group “Women’s Small Theatre” (여인소극장) and was the first female director in Korea. Park was killed by bomb shrapnel near her house in Bugahyeon-dong on September 28, 1950, during the Second Battle of Seoul in the Korean War. Oh later remarried to his student, Hyung-sun Kim (김형순) in 1958.

One of Oh’s translations, I Remember Mama, was performed by the August Theatre (팔월극장) as their organization's launch performance in the middle of October 1959. The August Theatre was a group consisting of both professional and amateur actors, wanting to promote the New Play Movement (신극운동) of Korea.

Oh suffered from the aftereffects of stomach cancer surgery in his later years and died in his house in Daesin-dong, Seodaemun-gu, Seoul on May 20, 1979.

==== Reception of suspended sentence ====
Oh received a suspended sentence due to his brother-in-law, Yeon-cheol Jeong (정연철), who visited his house 10 years after defecting to North Korea on October 11, 1960. Jeong confessed to Oh that he was sent by North Korea’s ruling Workers’ Party in an attempt to win over Oh. Although Oh chased his brother-in-law out of his house at the time, he was put on trial and received a suspended sentence on January 18, 1961 for not reporting Jeong to the police.

Oh was initially sentenced to two years in prison after the first trial on January 11, 1961. Oh claimed that he did not know it was a crime to fail to report spies from North Korea although he chose to chase Jeong from his house.

Oh was then given a suspended sentence on January 18, 1961. Afterwards, Oh was declared innocent in the High Court but was then given a suspended sentence by the Supreme Court on October 5, 1961.

===== Literary and academic career =====
- 1946–1950: Associate professor at Korea University
- 1952–1953: Associate professor at Pusan National University
- 1962, 1965–1979: Professor at Yonsei University
- 1964: Professor at Sookmyung Women’s University
- 1965: Professor at Sungkyunkwan University
- 1963–1965: President of the Korean Society of English Language and Literature
- 1970–1972: Dean of the College of Liberal Arts of Yonsei University
- 1975–1979: Dean of Yonsei University’s Graduate School of Education

==== Contribution to theater arts ====
After the Korean War, Oh started to contribute to theatre arts by sponsoring and founding multiple theatre societies in Korea. He was a founding member of Theatre Livre (떼아뜨르 리브르), the Yonhee Theater Art Research Club (연희극예술연구회) in 1953, and the Theatre Group Sanha (극단 산하) in 1963. He was also the director of the Korean Shakespeare Society from 1963 to 1979.

At Theatre Livre, Oh’s translations were performed frequently with Geun-young Jeon (전근영) as the director. The performed works include Eugene O’Neill’s Beyond the Horizon and the lecture series New Year’s First Regular Theatre Course (신년제일회정기연극강좌). In particular, the production of Beyond the Horizon holds a significant place in South Korean theatre history, as it was the debut performance of the legendary Korean actor Lee Soon-jae.

Oh also contributed to theatre arts by delivering lectures at many venues. In the New Year’s First Regular Theatre Course hosted by Theatre Livre and held at the Freedom Theater (자유극장) on February 14 and 15, 1958, Oh gave a lecture titled Monologue Theory (독백론). This lecture holds its significance in Korean literature and theatre history as an early example of a Korean scholar showcasing research and criticism about English theatre.

Oh said in an interview during his active years in theater with The Chosun Ilbo, one of South Korea’s daily newspapers, “I don’t want to settle for just the title of an English literature scholar for two reasons. First, I am not worthy of being an English literature scholar and secondly, the title alone is not enough to place oneself even in a corner of a page in history, participating in Korea’s artistic movements”. Oh expressed his passion for the theater arts movement in Korea and said that he wanted to pass on the governance of Theatre Livre to the eager younger generation and let them lead the society with their autonomous leadership.

== Awards ==
Oh received the third annual Korean Translation Literary Award in 1962 for his translation of American playwright Eugene O’Neill’s Long Day’s Journey into Night (1956). The award was given by the Korean Headquarters of the International Pen Club (국제펜클럽 한국본부), sponsored by Eulyoo Publishing (을유문화사). The translation was published by Sudomunhwasa (수도문화사) in 1962. The award holds its significance as the Korean Headquarters of the International Pen Club society’s acknowledgement of a quality translation of an American play. The society has been giving such awards since its establishment in 1954.

== Publications ==
=== Essays ===
- Appreciation of Modern English and American Short Stories ((현대) 영미 단편 소설 감상, 1959)
- Testimonials of Professor, Dol-i, and Poet: Collection of Essays (敎授와 乭伊와 詩人의 증言, 1963)
- This Small Passion (이 조그만 情熱을, 1973)
- There are Many Ways (거기 수많은 길이, 1978)
- Come like Water, Gone like Wind (물같이 와서 바람같이 가다, 1979)

==== Translations ====
- Long Day’s Journey into Night (1956) by Eugene O’Neill
- Beyond the Horizon (1920) by Eugene O’Neill
- Our Town (1938) by Thornton Wilder
- The Matchmaker (1954) by Thornton Wilder
- The Glass Menagerie (1944) by Tennessee Williams
- A Streetcar Named Desire (1947), by Tennessee Williams
- A Cat on a Hot Tin Roof (1955) by Tennessee Williams
- Death of a Salesman (1949) by Arthur Miller
- Watch on the Rhine (1941) by Lillian Hellman
- Othello (1603) by William Shakespeare
- The Merry Wives of Windsor (1602) by William Shakespeare
- Tempest (1611) by William Shakespeare
- I Remember Mama (1944) by John Van Druten (based on the novel Mama’s Bank Account by Kathryn Forbes)
- The Hasty Heart (1944) by John Patrick
- Who’s Afraid of Virginia Woolf? (1962) by Edward Albee
- Pride and Prejudice (1813) by Jane Austen

===== Books =====
- Appreciation of Modern English and American Short Stories ((현대) 영미 단편 소설 감상, 1970)
- Appreciation of Modern English and American Short Stories ((현대) 영미 단편 소설 감상, 1961)
