= Chung Doo-un =

South Korean politician (1957–2019)

- 정두언
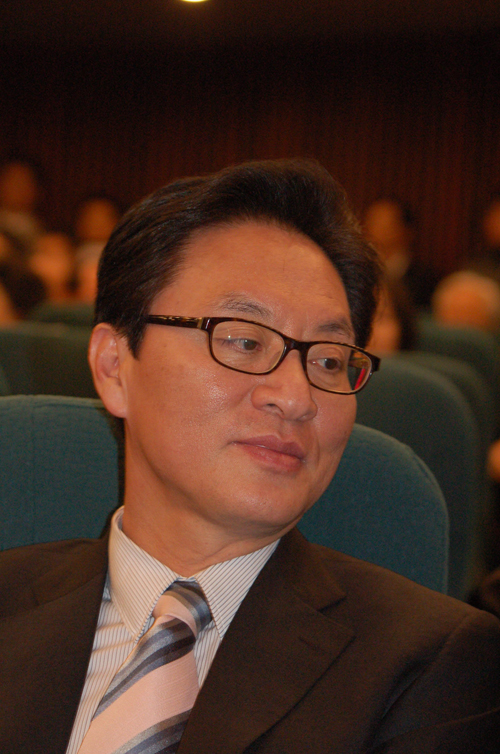

Member of the National Assembly
- In office 30 May 2004 – 29 May 2016
- Preceded by: Jang Se-sik
- Succeeded by: Kim Young-ho
- Constituency: Seodaemun B (Seoul)

Vice Mayor of Seoul
- In office 1 July 2002 – 1 November 2003

Personal details
- Born: 6 March 1957 Hongeun-dong, Seodaemun District, Seoul, South Korea
- Died: 16 July 2019 (aged 62) Seoul, South Korea
- Party: Grand National Party (2000–2002, 2003–2012); Independent (2002–2003); Saenuri Party (2012–2016); Independent (2016–2019)
- Education: Seoul National University; Georgetown University; Kookmin University
- Website: Official Website

Korean name
- Hangul: 정두언
- Hanja: 鄭斗彦
- RR: Jeong Dueon
- MR: Chŏng Tuŏn

Chung Doo-un (Korean: 정두언, 6 March 1957 – 16 July 2019) was a South Korean politician who served as a Member of the National Assembly from 2004 to 2016.

Chung, along with Chu ho-young and Park Heong-joon, was a close associate of President Lee Myung-bak but later became critical of him and the leadership of the Grand National Party after Lee's election. On 26 August 2011, he described Lee Myung-bak's fair society governance as a failure due to the prime minister-led surveillance against civilians in 2010.

The Minjoo Party's Kim Young-ho took his seat in the National Assembly at the 20th general election, held on 13 April 2016.

== Election results ==
Year	Elections	Constituency	Political party	Votes (%)	Results
2000	16th National Assembly General Election	Seodaemun B (Seoul)	GNP	31,304 (42.68%)	Defeated
2004	17th National Assembly General Election	Seodaemun B (Seoul)	GNP	39,734 (45.59%)	Won
2008	18th National Assembly General Election	Seodaemun A (Seoul)	GNP	36,931 (59.07%)	Won
2012	19th National Assembly General Election	Seodaemun B (Seoul)	Saenuri	35,380 (49.39%)	Won
2016	20th National Assembly General Election	Seodaemun B (Seoul)	Saenuri	33,852 (39.87%)	Defeated

== Death ==
Chung committed suicide, aged 62, in a park in Seoul on 16 July 2019.

National Assembly of the Republic of Korea
Preceded by Jang Se-sik	Member of the Assembly for Seodaemun-eul; 2004–2016	Succeeded by Kim Young-ho
