= 漢城 (disambiguation) =

漢城 or 汉城 may refer to:

- Hancheng Subdistrict (汉城街道), Xinye County, Nayang, Henan Province, People's Republic of China
- Hancheng Subdistrict (汉城街道), Weiyang District, Xi'an, Shaanxi Province, People's Republic of China
- Seoul, South Korea, once known in Hanja as Hanseong (漢城)
  - Hanseong High School
  - Hansung University
