= Who In-jung =

South Korean volleyball player (born 1974)

Personal information
- Nationality: South Korean
- Born: 19 April 1974 (age 52) Suwon, South Korea

Sport
- Sport: Volleyball

Who In-jung (Korean: 후인정; born 19 April 1974) is a South Korean volleyball player and coach. He competed in the men's tournament at the 2000 Summer Olympics. He is the current director of KB Insurance Stars.

Originally a citizen of the Republic of China, Hu became a naturalized Korean citizen in 1995, becoming the founder of the Suwon Hu clan, in order to play on the South Korean national volleyball team.

== As a Player ==
Who In-jung was born on April 19, 1974, in Suwon, South Korea. He spent his childhood in his father's hometown, Ganggyeong-eup, Nonsan County, South Chungcheong Province. His family were originally Korean-Chinese Chinese nationals of the Republic of China. Grandpa Hu Bae-hang came to the Korean Peninsula from Shandong Province in China in the 1920s and opened a Chinese restaurant in Daeheung-ri, Ganggyeong-myeon, Nonsan County, South Chungcheong Province. His father, Hu Guk-ki, started playing volleyball when he was in Ganggyeong Commercial High School, and after working as a player in the industrial team Geumseong News in the 1970s, he served as the manager of the business team Seon-kyung (later renamed to SK Chemicals). His father, Hu Guk-ki, was unable to become naturalized due to opposition from his father, Hu Bae-hang, so he played for the Chinese Taipei national team instead of the Korean national team. After becoming naturalized to the Republic of Korea, Who In-jung became the progenitor of the Suwon Hu clan, taking Suwon-si, Gyeonggi-do as the main building, where the main building of Kyonggi University was located.

After graduating from Inchang Middle School and Inchang High School in Seoul, he graduated from Kyonggi University and joined the Hyundai Motor Service Volleyball Team (currently Cheonan Hyundai Capital Skywalkers) in 1996. His team, Hyundai Capital Skywalkers, won the regular league championship in 2005, the first year of their career.

On December 2, 2009, he became the lucky hero of the team's 2,000th blocking in the match against the NH Nonghyup 2009-2010 V-League Shin Hyeop Sangmu.

At the end of the V-League 2012-13 season, he became a free agent, but his contract with the team was unsuccessful and he announced his retirement. After that, coach Shin Young-cheol moved to Suwon KEPCO Big Storm and returned to the courts.

After the first half of the V-League 2015-16 season ended and KEPCO exceeded the number of players in a 2:1 trade with Korean Air, he announced his retirement in 2016 and started working as a trainer. The new captain is Seo Jae-duk.

== Post-retirement ==
He worked as a coach at KEPCO Big Storm in Suwon until 2017, then moved to his alma mater, Kyonggi University, and worked as a coach under manager Lee Sang-ryeol.
