= Okcheon-dong =

- Country: South Korea

Korean name
- Hangul: 옥천동
- Hanja: 玉川洞
- RR: Okcheon-dong
- MR: Okch'ŏn-dong

Okcheon-dong (Korean: 옥천동) is a legal dong (neighbourhood) of Seodaemun District, Seoul, South Korea. It is administered by its administrative dong, Cheonyeon-dong's office.

== See also ==
- Administrative divisions of South Korea
