= Seodaemun Art Hall =

Former movie theater in Seoul, South Korea

Seodaemun Art Hall (Korean: 서대문 아트홀) was a South Korean movie theater located in Seodaemun District, Seoul. South Korea. Originally called Hwayang Theater, it opened in 1964 and was demolished in 2012.

== History ==
Seodaemun Art Hall opened in 1964 as Hwayang Theater. In its early years the theater screened classic Hollywood films such as Ben-Hur and The Sound of Music, and in the 1980s was a hotspot for Hong Kong cinema, hosting premieres and drawing actors such as Leslie Cheung and Chow Yun-fat. It went into decline with the increasing popularity of multiplex movie theaters, and despite changing its name to Dream Cinema in 1999, this attempt to rebrand its image was unsuccessful. In recent years the theater has been limited to screening free previews or films that are long past their opening dates. As of 2008, Seodaemun Art Hall was the last remaining single screen movie theater in Seoul.

== Closure ==
With plans to redevelop the area and the building facing demolition, Seodaemun Art Hall announced in October 2007 that it would be closing. To give the theater an appropriate farewell, Kim Eun-joo, the head of Seodaemun Art Hall, invested ₩100 million in upgrading the movie screen and sound system for the purpose of screening her favourite film, Dirty Dancing, for which she translated subtitles herself. The theater was given a retro 1980s look, and a 24 m (79 ft) hand painted advertising board for the film was created to decorate the entrance. Painted by local artist Kim Young-jun, the board took him and his assistants one week to complete.

Dirty Dancing opened at Seodaemun Art Hall in November 2007, and with low priced tickets costing ₩3,500 it attracted 700 to 1,000 viewers per day, several times more than the theater's average audience numbers. The popularity of the screening allowed the film's run to extend into early 2008. Although the theater still remains due to close, it has continued to screen films throughout the year, with a re-release of Hong Kong film A Better Tomorrow opening on 8 August 2008.

As of 2012, Seodaemun Art Hall is demolished.

== Location ==
Seodaemun Art Hall is located directly outside exit 8 of Seodaemun Station on Seoul Subway Line 5.
