= Migeun-dong =

- Country: South Korea

Korean name
- Hangul: 미근동
- Hanja: 渼芹洞
- RR: Migeun-dong
- MR: Migŭn-dong

Migeun-dong (Korean: 미근동) is a legal dong (neighbourhood) of Seodaemun District, Seoul, South Korea and is governed by its administrative dong, Cheonyeon-dong's office.

The Korean National Police Agency has its headquarters in the neighbourhood.

== See also ==
- Administrative divisions of South Korea
