= Naengcheon-dong =

- Country: South Korea

Korean name
- Hangul: 냉천동
- Hanja: 冷泉洞
- RR: Naengcheon-dong
- MR: Naengch'ŏn-dong

Naengcheon-dong (Korean: 냉천동) is a legal dong (neighbourhood) of Seodaemun District, Seoul, South Korea. It is governed by its administrative dong, Cheonyeon-dong's office.

== See also ==
- Administrative divisions of South Korea
