= Hap-dong =

- Country: South Korea

Korean name
- Hangul: 합동
- Hanja: 蛤洞
- RR: Hap-dong
- MR: Hap-tong

Hap-dong (Korean: 합동) is a legal dong (neighborhood) of Seodaemun District, Seoul, South Korea and is governed by its administrative dong, Chungjeongno-dong's office.

== See also ==
- Administrative divisions of South Korea
