= Seodaemun Museum of Natural History =

Coordinates: 37°34′36″N 126°56′16″E

Seodaemun Museum of Natural History 서대문 자연사박물관
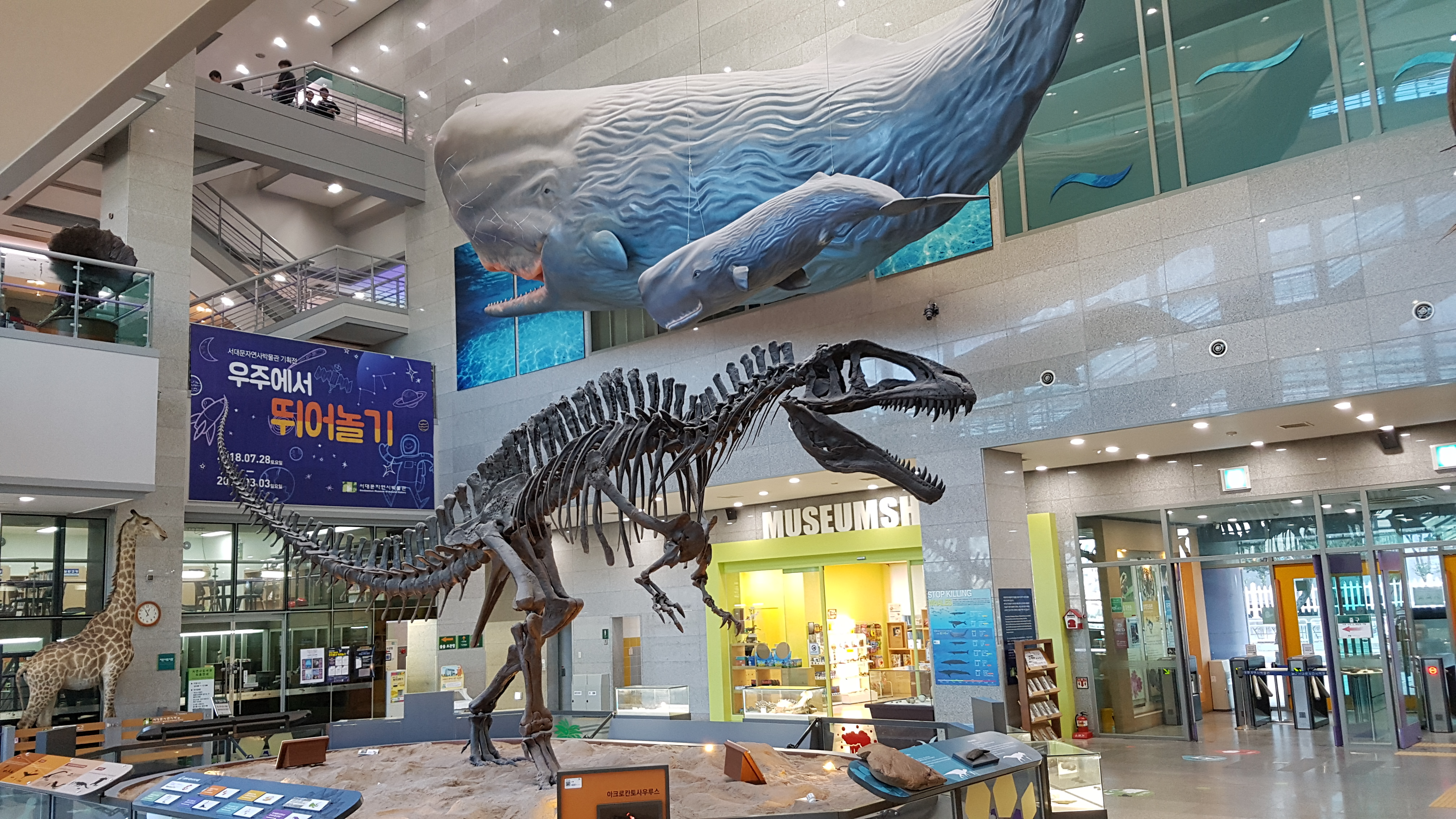
- Established: July 2003
- Location: San 5-58 Yeonhui-3 dong, Seodaemun-gu; Seoul, South Korea
- Type: Natural history museum
- Website: https://namu.sdm.go.kr/

Seodaemun Museum of Natural History is a first public museum of natural history in South Korea, located in a metropolitan area, Seodaemun-gu, Seoul. It was founded in 2003 and operated by Seodaemun-gu Administration. The purpose of the foundation is to preserve, to study, and to exhibit geological and biological records about the local environment.

== Popular culture ==
Seodaemun Museum of Natural History was used as the main filming location in episode 84 of the South Korean variety show Running Man filmed in 2012.

== See also ==
- List of museums in Seoul
