= Baengnyeonsan =

Mountain in Seoul, South Korea

- Location within Seoul Location within South Korea

Highest point
- Elevation: 216 m (709 ft)
- Coordinates: 37°35′30″N 126°55′39″E

Geography
- Location: South Korea

Korean name
- Hangul: 백련산
- Hanja: 白蓮山
- RR: Baengnyeonsan
- MR: Paengnyŏnsan

Baengnyeonsan is a mountain in Seoul, South Korea, lying on the border between Eunpyeong District and Seodaemun District. It has an elevation of 216 m (709 ft). The name "Baengnyeonsan" means "White Lotus Mountain".
