= Yeongcheon-dong =

- Interactive map of Yeongcheon-dong
- Country: South Korea

Korean name
- Hangul: 영천동
- Hanja: 靈泉洞
- RR: Yeongcheon-dong
- MR: Yŏngch'ŏn-dong

Yeongcheon-dong (Korean: 영천동) is a legal dong (neighbourhood) of Seodaemun District, Seoul, South Korea. It is administered by its administrative dong, Cheonyeon-dong's office.

== See also ==
- Administrative divisions of South Korea
