= Chunghyeon-dong =

Coordinates: 37.564°N 126.958°E

- Interactive map of Chunghyeon-dong
- Country: South Korea

Korean name
- Hangul: 충현동
- Hanja: 忠峴洞
- RR: Chunghyeon-dong
- MR: Ch'unghyŏn-dong

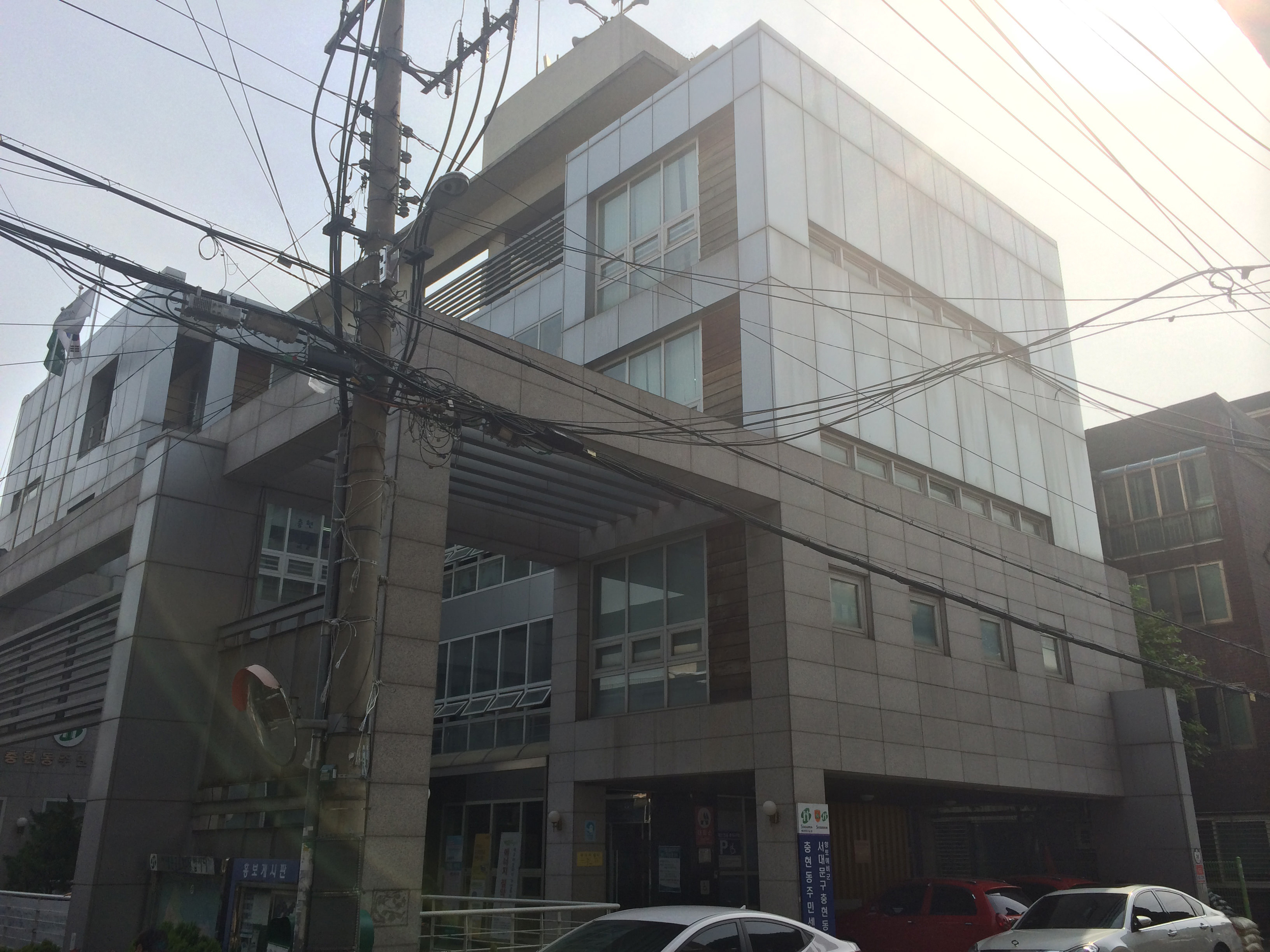
Chunghyeon-dong Comunity Service Center

Chunghyeon-dong (Korean: 충현동) is a dong (neighborhood) of Seodaemun District, Seoul, South Korea.

== Overview ==
Uiryeongwon, located within the present-day grounds of Jungang Girls' High School, was the tomb of Prince Uiso, the eldest son of Crown Prince Sado. It was also known as "Aegineung" (literally "the baby royal tomb").

During the Japanese colonial period, the area was known as Bukahyeonjeong, and in 1946 it was renamed Bukahyeon-dong. In 1964, following the completion of the Daehyeon land readjustment project, most of the area north of Sinchon-ro, along with parts of Ahyeon-dong in Mapo-gu, was incorporated into Bukahyeon-dong. In 1955, Bukahyeon-dong was divided into Bukahyeon 1-dong, 2-dong, and 3-dong. In May 2008, Chungjeongno-dong and Bukahyeon 3-dong were merged, and the newly integrated administrative district was named Chunghyeon-dong.

== See also ==
- Administrative divisions of South Korea
