= Hongneung Arboretum =

Arboretum in Seoul, South Korea

Coordinates: 37.59306°N 127.04372°E

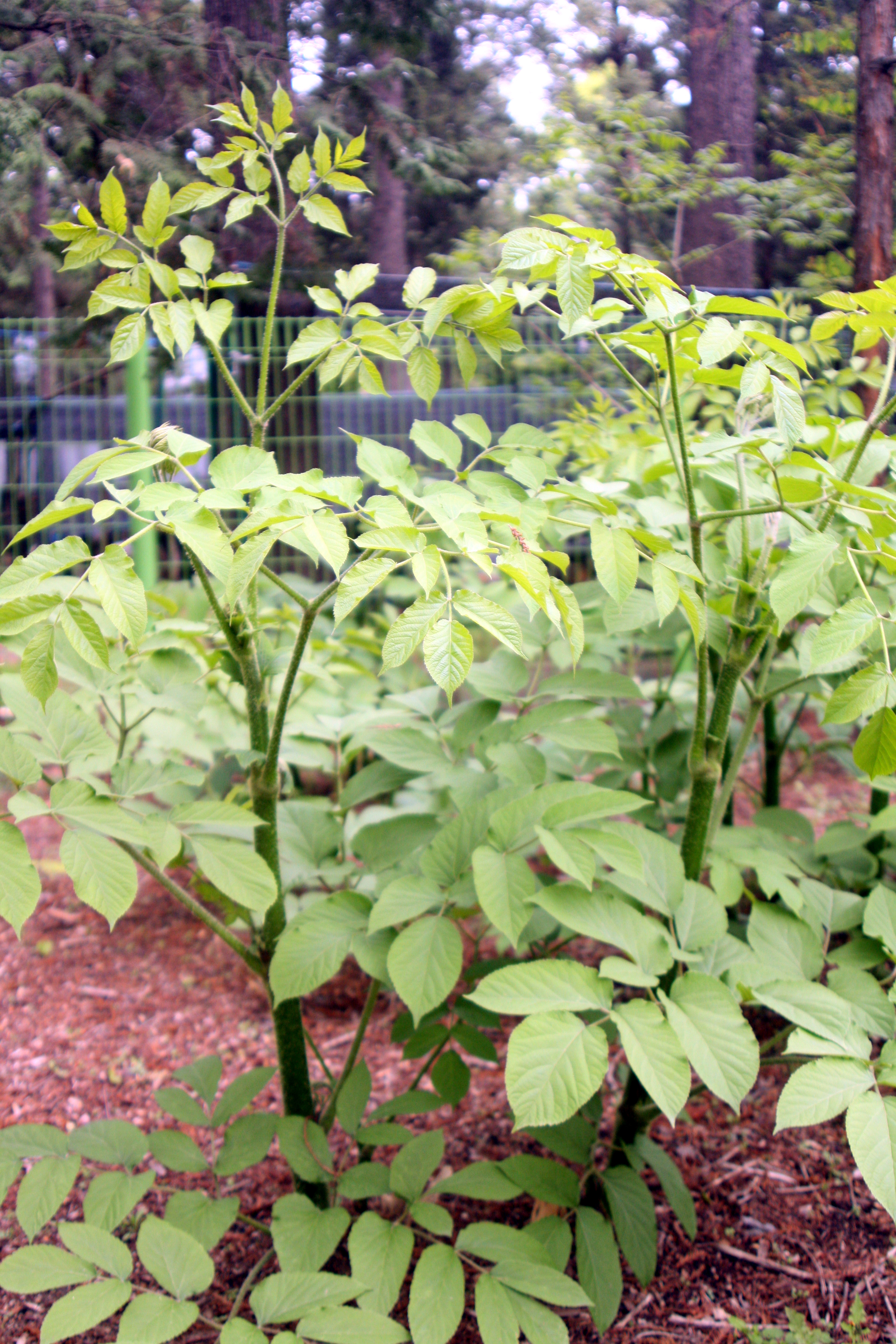
Hongneung Arboretum, Aralia cordata, 2009.

Hongneung Arboretum (Korean: 홍릉수목원; Hanja: 洪陵樹木園) is an arboretum in Dongdaemun District, Seoul, served by Seoul Subway Line 6. The grounds are freely open to the public on weekend, but picnics are not allowed.
