= Changcheon-dong =

Coordinates: 37.558°N 126.935°E

- Interactive map of Changcheon-dong
- Country: South Korea

Area
  - Total: 0.61 km^{2} (0.24 sq mi)

Population (2001)
  - Total: 11,915
  - Density: 20,000/km^{2} (51,000/sq mi)

Korean name
- Hangul: 창천동
- Hanja: 滄川洞
- RR: Changcheon-dong
- MR: Ch'angch'ŏn-dong

Changcheon-dong (Korean: 창천동) is a dong (neighborhood) of Seodaemun District, Seoul, South Korea. It is home to the only Mormon Temple in the country.

The Synnara Record Shop in Changcheon was one of the main filming locations for Seoul Broadcasting System's 2001 drama Beautiful Days, starring Lee Byung-hun, Choi Ji-woo, Ryu Si-won, Shin Min-a, Lee Jung-hyun and Lee Yoo-jin

The area also features a 66 m^{2} store of the Korean cosmetics brand Skin Food, which has been open since June 2004. Additionally, it sells Traditional Korean medicine or hanbang.

== See also ==
- Administrative divisions of South Korea
