= Gusu-dong =

Coordinates: 37°12′N 127°12′E

- Interactive map of Gusu-dong
- Country: South Korea

Korean name
- Hangul: 구수동
- Hanja: 舊水洞
- RR: Gusu-dong
- MR: Kusu-dong

Gusu-dong (Korean: 구수동) is a dong (neighborhood) of Mapo District, Seoul, South Korea.

== See also ==
- Administrative divisions of South Korea
