= Namgajwa-dong =

- Country: South Korea

Area
  - Total: 1.27 km^{2} (0.49 sq mi)

Population (2008)
  - Total: 48,349
  - Density: 38,100/km^{2} (98,600/sq mi)

Korean name
- Hangul: 남가좌동
- Hanja: 南加佐洞
- RR: Namgajwa-dong
- MR: Namgajwa-dong

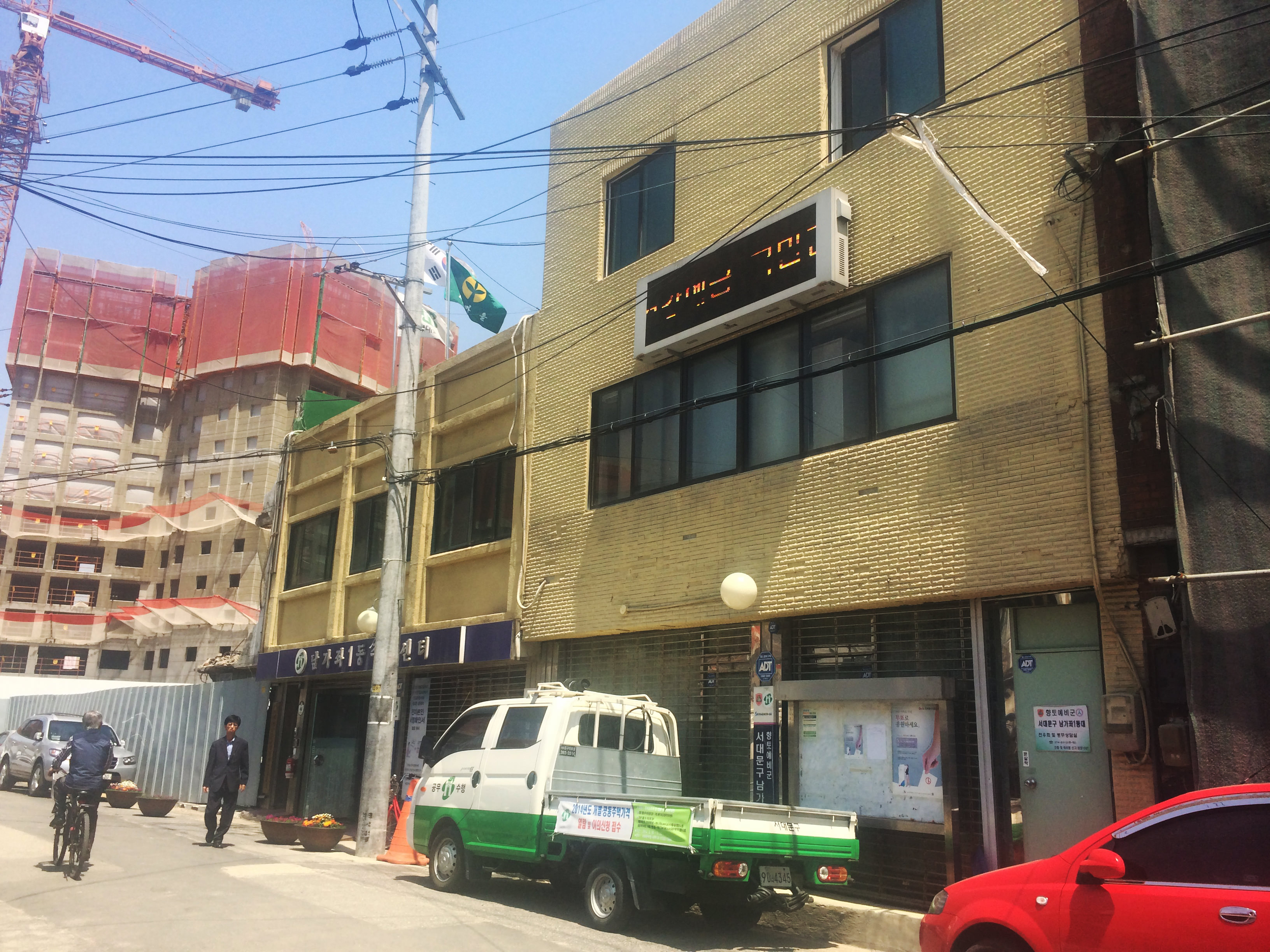
Namgajwa 1-dong Community Service Center (Seodaemun-gu).

Namgajwa-dong (Korean: 남가좌동) is a dong (neighbourhood) of Seodaemun District, Seoul, South Korea.

== Overview ==
The name "Gajwa”" in Namgajwa-dong originated from the area's former name, "Gajaeul", meaning "the village of crayfish." The area was surrounded by mountains and was known for having many crayfish, so it was also written in Sino-Korean characters as Gajwari. Later, when the area was divided into Bukgajwa-dong and Namgajwa-dong, the name Namgajwa-dong was adopted to indicate that it was located south of Gajaeul.

== See also ==
- Administrative divisions of South Korea
