= Bongwon-dong =

Coordinates: 37.573°N 126.947°E

- Interactive map of Bongwon-dong
- Country: South Korea

Korean name
- Hangul: 봉원동
- Hanja: 奉元洞
- RR: Bongwon-dong
- MR: Pongwŏn-dong

Bongwon-dong (Korean: 봉원동) is a legal dong (neighborhood) of Seodaemun District, Seoul, South Korea and is governed by its administrative dong, Sinchon-dong's office. Bongwon-dong has the Bongwon-Temple(Bongwonsa) built by Great master Doseon (827–898) in 889, 3rd year of Jinseong Queen, the 51st of the Silla Dynasty.

Bongwon-Temple gives opportunities for visitors to experience "Seoul Lotus Festival" and "Yeongsamjae ritual" annually.

== See also ==
- Administrative divisions of South Korea
