= Bugahyeon-dong =

Coordinates: 37.561°N 126.954°E

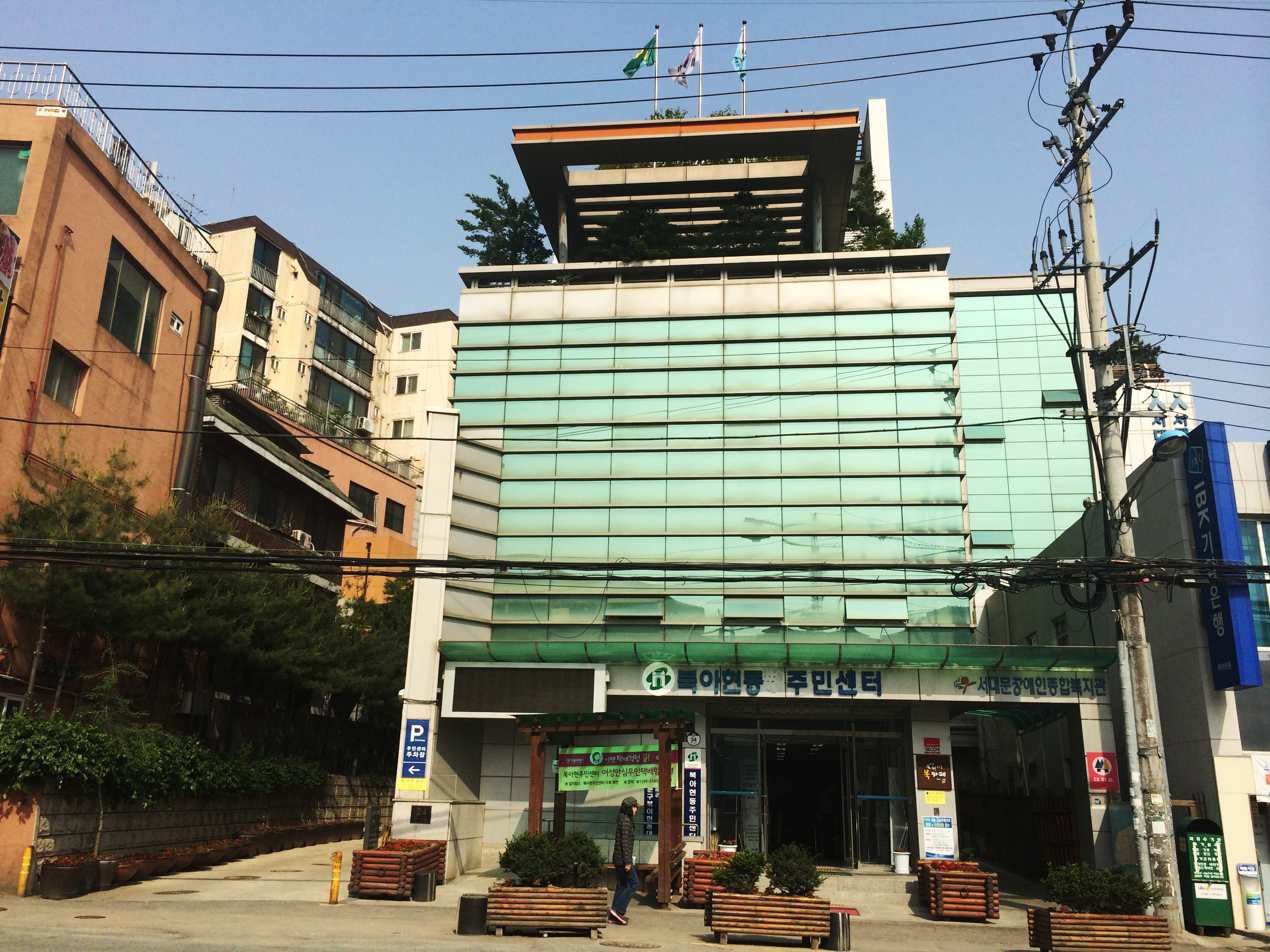
- Bugahyeon-dong Community Service Center
- Interactive map of Bugahyeon-dong
- Country: South Korea

Area
  - Total: 1.07 km^{2} (0.41 sq mi)

Korean name
- Hangul: 북아현동
- Hanja: 北阿峴洞
- RR: Bugahyeon-dong
- MR: Pugahyŏn-dong

Bugahyeon-dong (Korean: 북아현동) is a dong (neighborhood) of Seodaemun District, Seoul, South Korea.

== Overview ==
During the Japanese colonial period, the area was known as Bugahyeonjeong. In 1946, its name was changed to Bugahyeon-dong. As a result, most of the area north of Sinchon-ro, along with Ahyeon-dong in Mapo-gu, was incorporated into Bugahyeon-dong.

In 1955, Bugahyeon-dong was divided into Bugahyeon 1-dong, 2-dong, and 3-dong. Later, on 6 May 2008, Bugahyeon 1-dong and Bugahyeon 2-dong were merged, forming the administrative district as it exists today.

During the Joseon Dynasty, this area belonged to the Western District of Hanseong (present-day Seoul) and was part of the administrative units of Ahyeon-gye, Chajarigye, and Gwonjeongseung-gye within Bansongbang.

In 1936, after the area was incorporated into Gyeongseong (the former name of Seoul during the Japanese colonial period), it was renamed Bugahyeonjeong.

On June 1, 1943, it was incorporated into Seodaemun-gu.

In 1964, the Daehyeon Land Readjustment Project was completed. As a result, the area north of Sinchon-ro, which had previously belonged to Ahyeon-dong in Mapo-gu, was incorporated into Bugahyeon-dong.

== See also ==
- Administrative divisions of South Korea
