= Hanseong High School =

Hansung High School 한성고등학교 漢城高等學校

Location
- 24 Bugahyeon-ro 3-gil, Seodaemun-gu; Seoul; South Korea
- Coordinates: 37°33′35″N 126°57′16″E

Information
- Type: Private
- Motto: Habit is stronger than will. Let's build up a good habit. (습관은 의지보다 강하다. 좋은 습관을 들이자)
- Established: 1928
- Principal: Lee Jaejin (이재진)
- Deputy Principal: Lee Woon-yong (이운용)
- Tree: Taxus
- Flower: Forythia
- Website: www.hanseong.hs.kr

Hansung High School (Korean: 한성고등학교; Hanja: 漢城高等學校) is a boys high school. The founder Ju-yik Kim opened the high school in Seodaemun District, 1928.
