= Hyeonjeo-dong =

Neighborhood of Seoul, South Korea

- Country: South Korea

Korean name
- Hangul: 현저동
- Hanja: 峴底洞
- RR: Hyeonjeo-dong
- MR: Hyŏnjŏ-dong

Hyeonjeo-dong (Korean: 현저동) is a legal dong (neighborhood) of Seodaemun District, Seoul, South Korea and is governed by its administrative dong, Cheonyeon-dong's office. There are in the Historic Sites "Dongnimmun (Independence Gate)" and Yeongeunmunjucho (Plinths of Yeongeunmun Gate).

== Overview ==
During the Joseon Dynasty, this area lay outside the Hanyang City Wall, and belonged to the Jihagye administrative district of Bansongbang. It was known as Mohwahyeon.

The name Hyeonjeo-dong was officially adopted on 1 April 1914, when the Japanese Government-General of Korea reorganized the administrative districts of Gyeongseong (Seoul).

== See also ==
- Administrative divisions of South Korea
