= Daehyeon-dong, Seoul =

Daehyeon-dong
- Country: South Korea

Korean name
- Hangul: 대현동
- Hanja: 大峴洞
- RR: Daehyeon-dong
- MR: Taehyŏn-dong

Daehyeon-dong (Korean: 대현동) is a legal dong (neighborhood) of Seodaemun District, Seoul, South Korea and is governed by its administrative dong, Sinchon-dong's office.

== Overview ==
During the Joseon Dynasty, this area belonged to Yeonhui-bang in the northern part of Hanseong. In 1914, following an administrative reorganization, the village of Saeteomal was incorporated into Yeonhui-myeon, Goyang County, Gyeonggi Province, and was renamed Sinchon-ri. In January 1936, with the expansion of Gyeongseong-bu, the area was incorporated into the city and renamed Sinchon-jeong.

In July 1940, Sinchon-jeong was under the jurisdiction of Gyeongseong-bu, and in June 1943 it became part of Seodaemun District. In October 1945, following the implementation of the district system, it was incorporated into Seodaemun-gu. In October 1946, as part of administrative reforms, the designation "jeong" was changed to "dong", resulting in the name Sinchon-dong.

The area included natural villages such as Daegol and Hongbudwitgol, as well as passes including Beorigogae and Aljeotgogae. The name Beorigogae is associated with the nearby burial site of Lady Yeongbin Yi, the mother of Crown Prince Jangheon, located at Sugyeongwon.

The name "Sinchon" derives from the Korean term "Saeteomal" ("new settlement"), which was later rendered in Chinese characters as "Sinchon" ("new village").

== See also ==
- Administrative divisions of South Korea
