= Hongje-dong =

Coordinates: 37°45′N 128°52′E

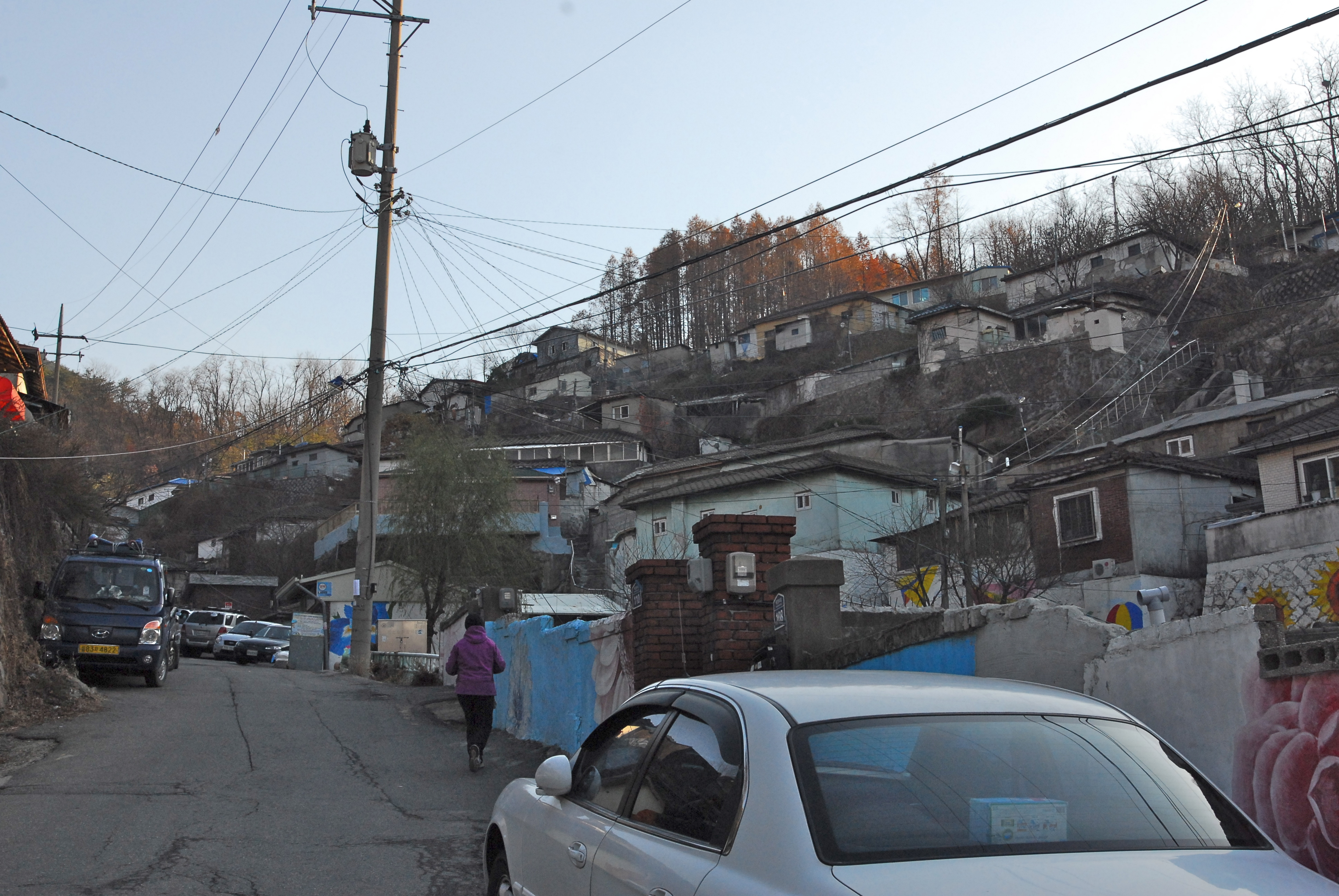
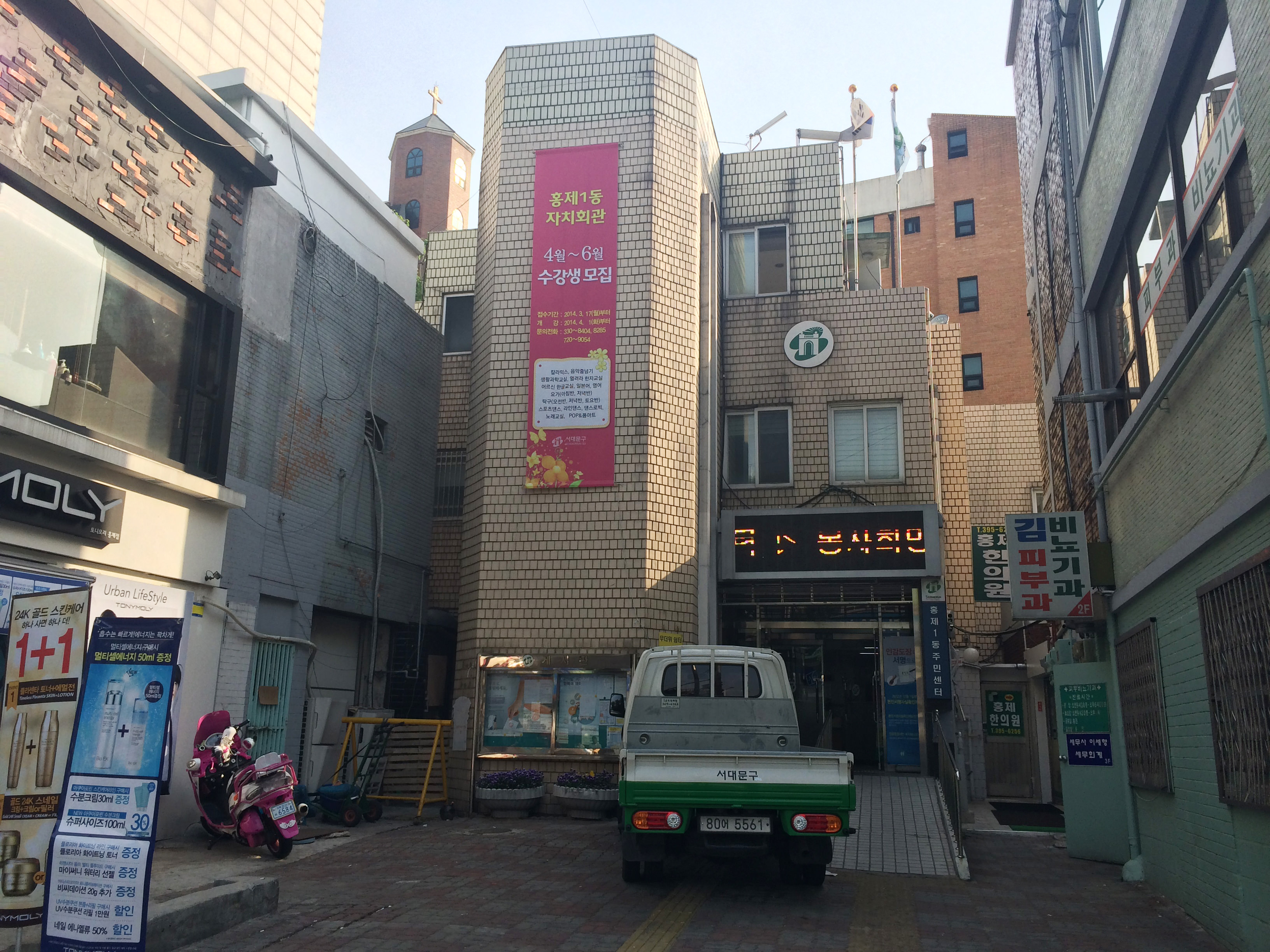
- Gaemi Village in Hongje-dong Hongje-dong Community Service Center
- Interactive map of Hongje-dong
- Country: South Korea

Area
  - Total: 3.09 km^{2} (1.19 sq mi)

Population (2008)
  - Total: 82,433
  - Density: 26,700/km^{2} (69,100/sq mi)

Korean name
- Hangul: 홍제동
- Hanja: 弘濟洞
- RR: Hongje-dong
- MR: Hongje-dong

Hongje-dong (Korean: 홍제동) is a dong (neighborhood) of Seodaemun District, Seoul, South Korea.

== Overview ==
The area was located along an important land route used by Chinese envoys traveling to and from Joseon. Hongjewon, a government guesthouse where Chinese envoys and travelers stayed, was located in this area, giving rise to the name of the district. It was originally called Hongjenaeri, meaning "the village inside Hongjewon," and after liberation the name was changed to Hongje-dong.

== See also ==
- Administrative divisions of South Korea
