= Ahyeon-dong =

- Ahyeon-dong Community Service Center (Mapo District)

- Location within Seoul Location within South Korea
- Coordinates: 37.555°N 126.957°E
- Country: South Korea

Area
  - Total: 0.79 km^{2} (0.31 sq mi)

Population (2001)
  - Total: 36,519
  - Density: 46,000/km^{2} (120,000/sq mi)

Korean name
- Hangul: 아현동
- Hanja: 阿峴洞
- RR: Ahyeon-dong
- MR: Ahyŏn-dong

Ahyeon-dong (Korean: 아현동) is a dong (neighborhood) of Mapo District, Seoul, South Korea.

== History ==
During the Joseon Dynasty, the area was part of Seobu Bansongbang in Hansungbu and belonged to the Ahyeon-gye (阿峴契), Chajari-gye (車子里契), and Gwonjeongseung-gye (權政丞契) communities. In 1914, it became Ahyeon-ri (阿峴里) in Yonggang-myeon (龍江面), Goyang-gun, Gyeonggi-do. In 1936, it was reorganized as Ahyeon-jeong (阿峴町) under Gyeongseongbu. On June 1, 1943, it was incorporated into Seodaemun-gu, and on October 23, 1944, into Mapo-gu.

On October 1, 1946, the area was renamed Ahyeon-dong. On April 18, 1955, it was divided into administrative districts Ahyeon 1, 2, 3, and 4-dong. On May 18, 1970, Ahyeon 4-dong was abolished. On January 2, 2007, Ahyeon 2 and 3-dong were merged into Ahyeon 2-dong. On January 7, 2008, Ahyeon 2-dong and Gongdeok 2-dong were merged to form the current Ahyeon-dong.

== See also ==
- Administrative divisions of South Korea
