= Hyeonseok-dong =

- Country: South Korea

Korean name
- Hangul: 현석동
- Hanja: 玄石洞
- RR: Hyeonseok-dong
- MR: Hyŏnsŏk-tong

Hyeonseok-dong (Korean: 현석동) is a dong (neighborhood) of Mapo District, Seoul, South Korea.

== See also ==
- Administrative divisions of South Korea
