= Bukgajwa-dong =

Coordinates: 37.578°N 126.910°E

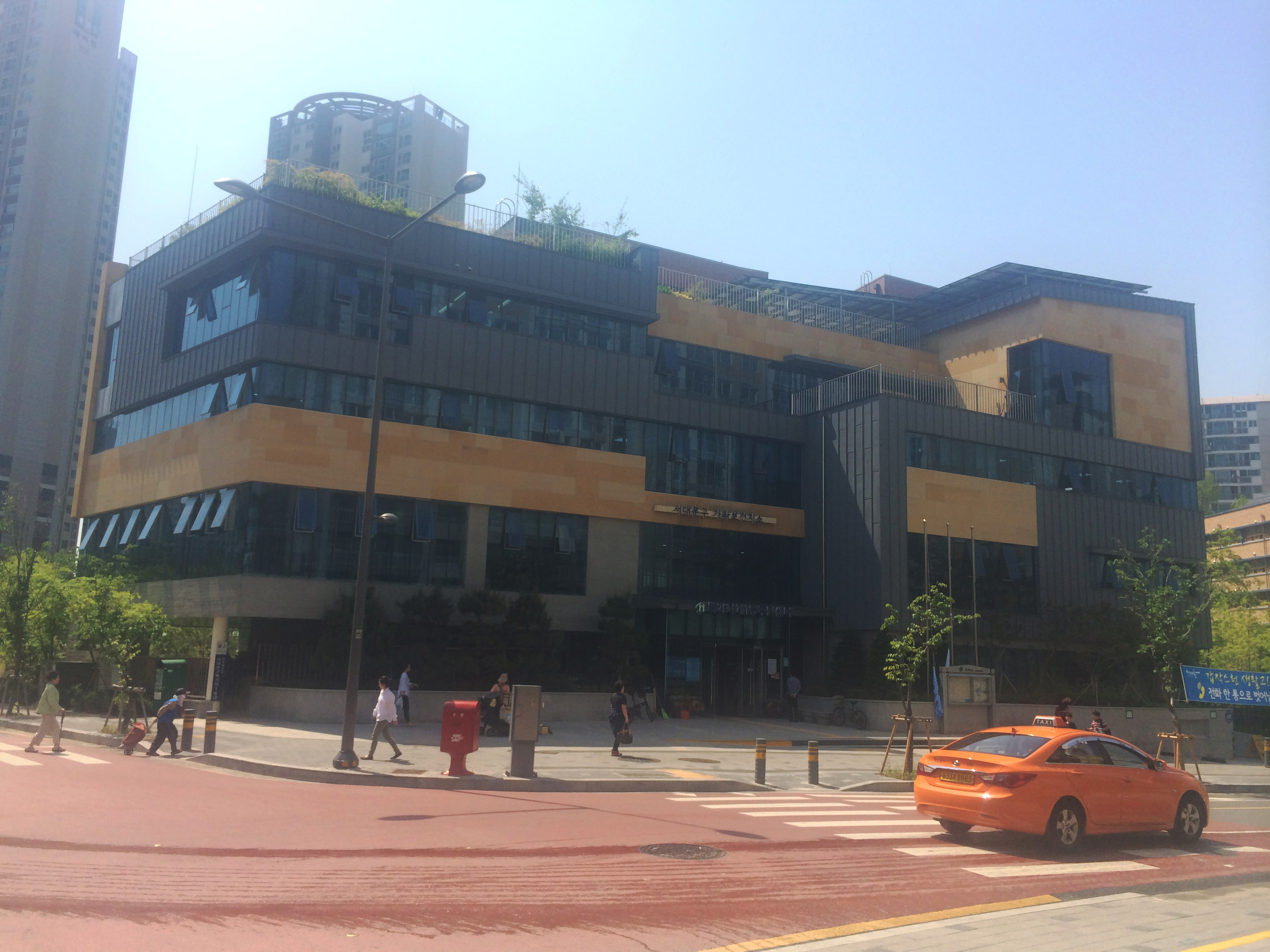
- Bukgajwa 1-dong Community Service Center
- Interactive map of Bukgajwa-dong
- Country: South Korea

Korean name
- Hangul: 북가좌동
- Hanja: 北加佐洞
- RR: Bukgajwa-dong
- MR: Pukkajwa-dong

Bukgajwa-dong (Korean: 북가좌동) is a dong (neighborhood) of Seodaemun District, Seoul, South Korea. Seoul Metropolitan City Tangible Cultural Heritage Number 41, Hwasangunsindobi (Prince Hwasangun's tomb monument), is located here.

== Overview ==
The name Bukgajwa-dong comes from the name Gajwa. The area was originally surrounded by mountains and had many crayfish, so it was called Gajaeul (meaning "crayfish village"). Later, when the area was divided into Bukgajwa-dong (North Gajwa-dong) and Namgajwa-dong (South Gajwa-dong), the name Bukgajwa-dong was given to indicate that it was located to the north of Gajaeul.

== See also ==
- Administrative divisions of South Korea
