= Daesin-dong, Seoul =

Daesin-dong
- Country: South Korea

Area
  - Total: 2.02 km^{2} (0.78 sq mi)

Population (2001)
  - Total: 8,397
  - Density: 4,160/km^{2} (10,800/sq mi)

Korean name
- Hangul: 대신동
- Hanja: 大新洞
- RR: Daesin-dong
- MR: Taesin-dong

Daesin-dong (Korean: 대신동) is a legal dong (neighborhood) of Seodaemun District, Seoul, South Korea and is governed by its administrative dong, Sinchon-dong's office. National Route 48 runs through this neighborhood, flanked by the nearby grounds of Yonsei University's Sinchon campus and Ewha Womans University.

== See also ==
- Administrative divisions of South Korea
