= Hongeun-dong =

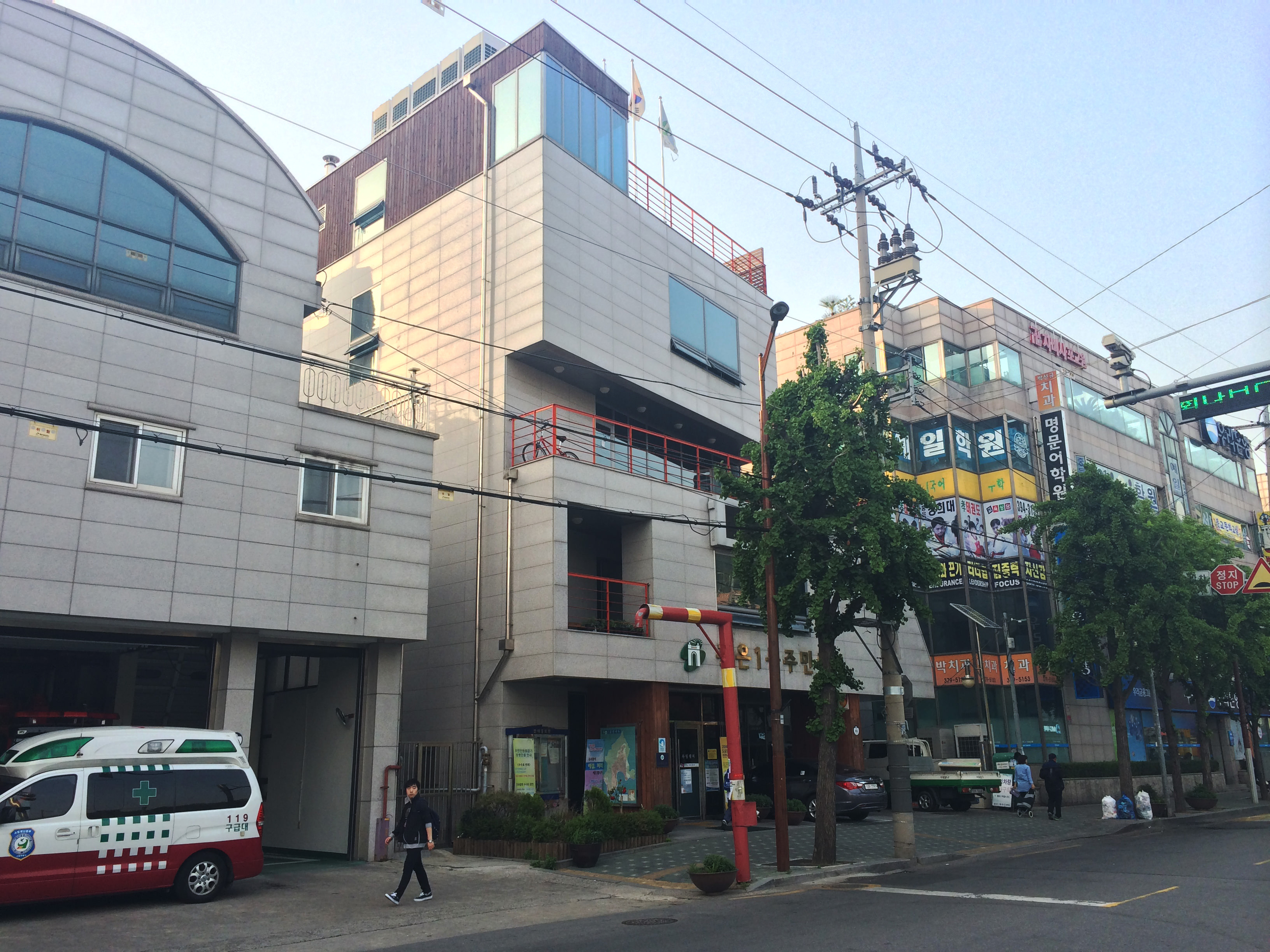
- Country: South Korea

Area
  - Total: 3.64 km^{2} (1.41 sq mi)

Population (2008)
  - Total: 58,281
  - Density: 16,000/km^{2} (41,500/sq mi)

Korean name
- Hangul: 홍은동
- Hanja: 弘恩洞
- RR: Hongeun-dong
- MR: Hongŭn-dong

Hongeun-dong (Korean: 홍은동) is a dong (neighborhood) of Seodaemun District, Seoul, South Korea.

== See also ==
- Administrative divisions of South Korea
