= Inchang High School =

- 인창고등학교
- Seoul; South Korea

Information
- Type: Private school
- Motto: Be Truthful, Steady, and Wise 참되게 줄기차게 슬기롭게
- Established: 1922
- Principal: Won Seung-Ho(원승호)
- Faculty: 80
- Grades: 10-12
- Enrollment: approx. 1,000
- Campus: City
- Tree: Pagoda Tree
- Flower: Korean Forsythia
- Website: http://www.inchang.ne.kr/

Inchang High School (Korean: 인창고등학교; RR: Inchang Godeung Hakgyo), also known as Inchang-Go(Korean: 인창고) or Seoul Inchang-Go(Korean: 서울 인창고) is one of the oldest private high schools in Seoul, South Korea founded in 1922.
