= Yeonhui-dong, Seoul =

Yeonhui-dong
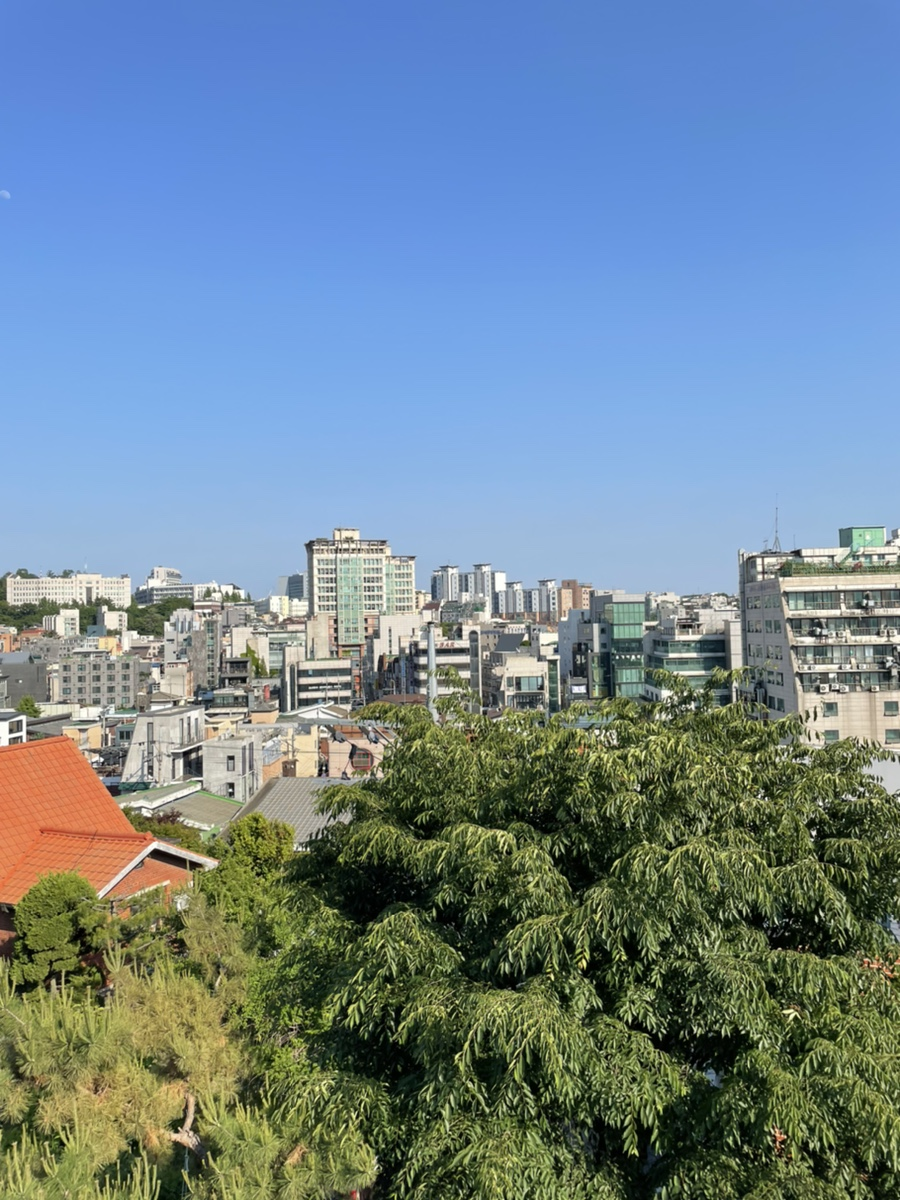
- Interactive map of Yeonhui-dong
- Country: South Korea

Area
  - Total: 3.05 km^{2} (1.18 sq mi)

Population (2001)
  - Total: 41,308
  - Density: 13,500/km^{2} (35,100/sq mi)

Korean name
- Hangul: 연희동
- Hanja: 延禧洞
- RR: Yeonhui-dong
- MR: Yŏnhŭi-dong

Yeonhui-dong (Korean: 연희동) is a dong (neighbourhood) at the center of Seodaemun District, Seoul, South Korea. It is an area in Seoul near Yonsei university, and actually the name Yonsei comes from the combination of Yeonhui (the former Yonhee College) and Severance (the former Severance Union Medical College, Severance Hospital).

A strategic position during the Korean War (Hill 104), the area is bordered by Hongjecheon to the West (a stream overlooked by an important expressway), Ansan to the East (the mountain where Yonsei University is located), and Yeonnam-dong (Mapo District) to the South.

Seodaemun District office is situated at the top of this triangle, along with the Seodaemun Health Center (서대문 보건소) and the Seodaemun Youth Center (서대문청소년수련관), with its public swimming pool.

== Names ==
During the Joseon period, the neighborhood had different names (Jeongja-dong, Yeom-dong, Gung-dong, Eumwol-ri). Under the Japanese occupation, it was sent to Gyeonggi Province, and returned to Gyeongseong-bu (Seoul) as Yeonhui-jeong (延禧町). In 1946 it became Yeonhui-dong.

Note that the Southern ('nam') part of Yeonhui-dong that joined Mapo District in 1975 – the section on the other side of the Southern section of the Gyeongui Line – was logically named Yeonnam-dong.

The name is a tribute to the Yeonhuigung palace praised by early Joseon kings, most notably King Sejong, who often stayed there on week-ends, and had the first Korean silk made in that palace.

== An international educational and residential area ==
Two major foreign schools, Seoul Foreign School and Seoul Chinese School, seat in Yeonhui-dong, which also hosts many hagwon. Note that if Yonsei owes its name to the area, the university is actually located in Sinchon-dong.

Many expat families live in this essentially low rise and residential area. If the Chinese community is less visible than a couple of years ago, some restaurants and shops subsist, particularly along Yeonhuimat-gil.

Among famous residents or former residents:

- Two former South Korean presidents: Chun Doo-hwan and Roh Tae-woo.
- Singer, Actors, Artists and Writers: Jeon Somi, Matthew Douma, Seo Taiji, Kim Young-ha, Choe U-ram, Park Seo-bo.

== Attractions and landmarks ==
- Seodaemun Museum of Natural History
- Seodaemun-gu office, Seodaemun Health Center, Seodaemun Youth Center
- Ansan Park, Ansan forest
- Seoul Art Space Yeonhui (writers residence)
- Site of Yeonhuigung palace – a well has been restored in the Western half of the neighborhood
- Site of the Yeonhui Hill 104 Battleground (연희 104고지 전적지), a strategic position during the Korean War, claimed by the South on September 21, 1950, defended from a counterattack by the North Korean forces the next day. A monument was erected on September 28, 1958.

== See also ==
- Yonsei University
- Seoul Foreign School
- Administrative divisions of South Korea
