= Seodaemun District =

District of Seoul, South Korea

Seodaemun
- Autonomous District
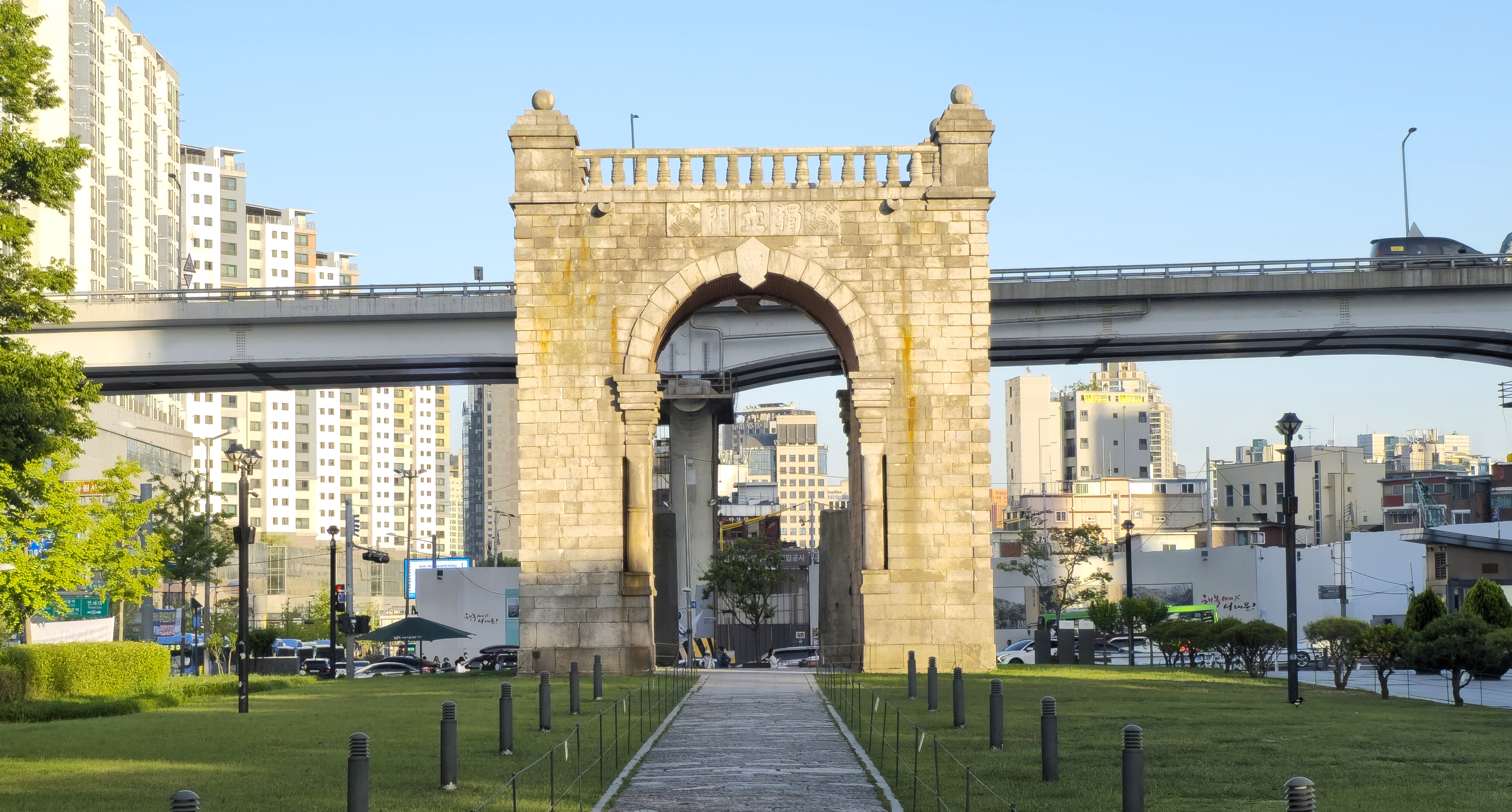
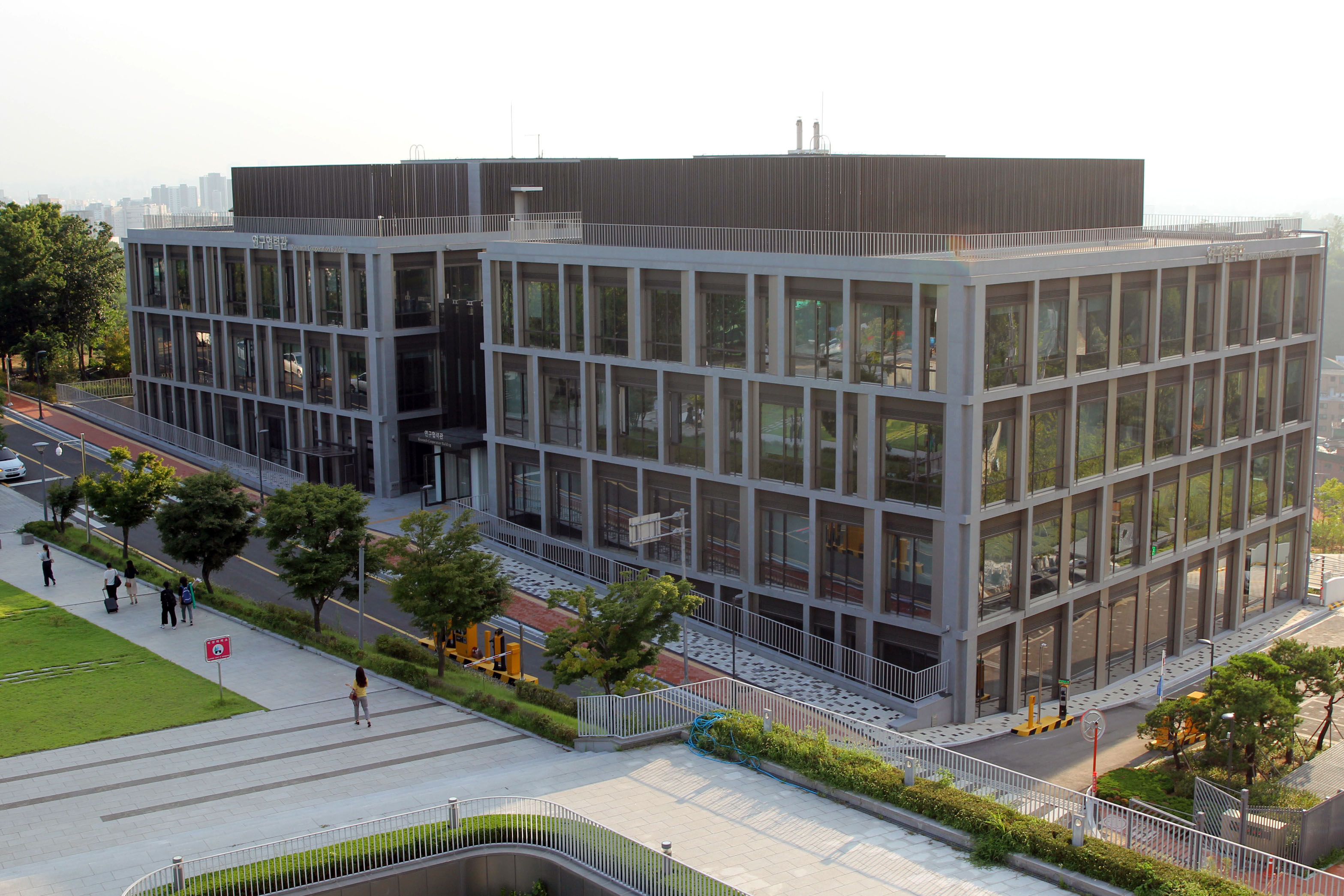
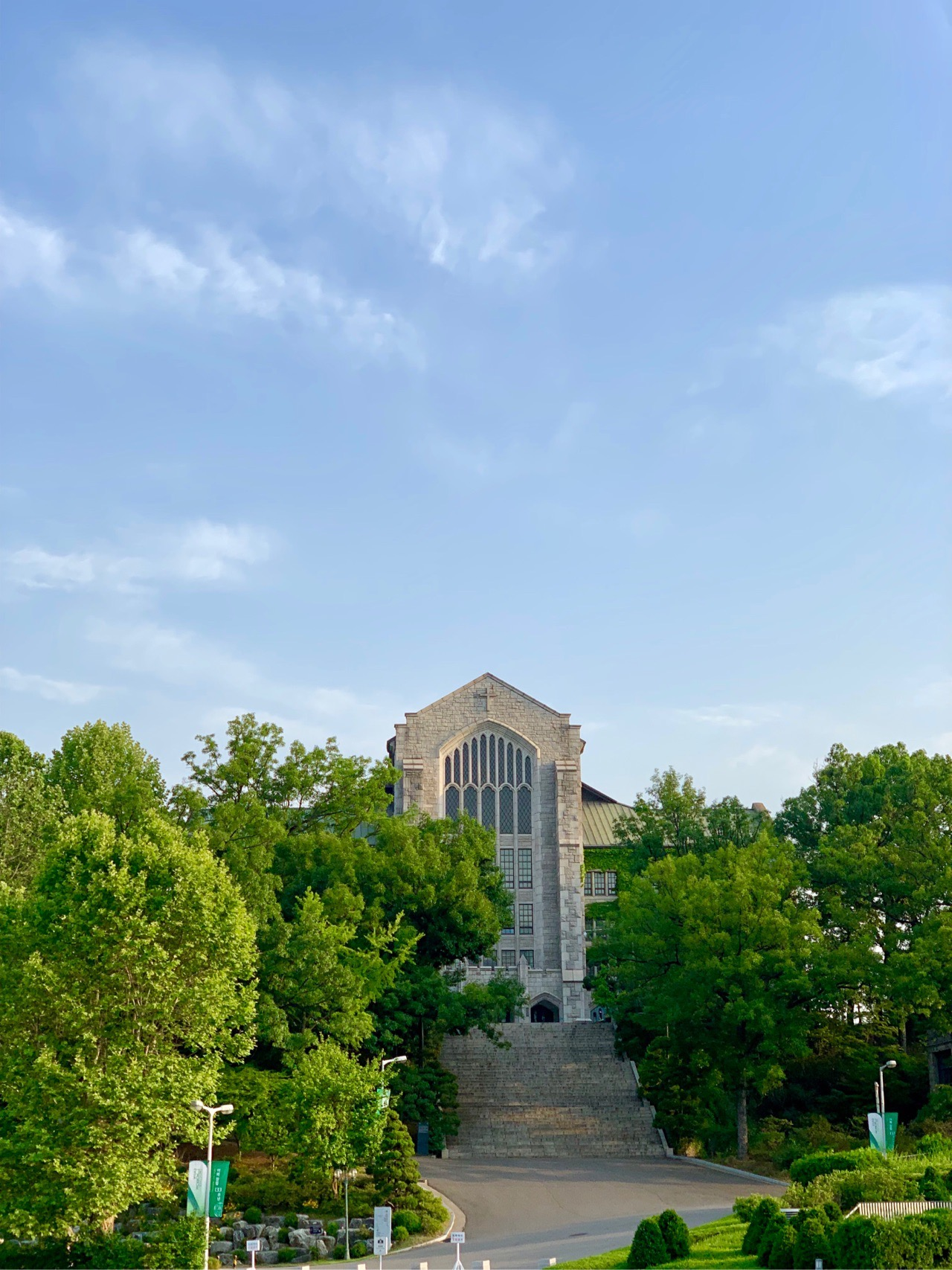
- Independence Gate Center for Quantum Nanoscience Ewha Womans University Inwangsan

- Flag

- Location of Seodaemun District in Seoul
- Coordinates: 37°34′45″N 126°56′12″E
- Country: South Korea
- Region: Sudogwon
- Special City: Seoul
- Administrative dong: 14

Government
  - Body: Seodaemun District Council
  - Mayor: Park Woon-ki (Democratic)
  - MNAs: List of MNAs: Woo Sang-ho (Democratic); Kim Yeong-ho (Democratic)

Area
  - Total: 17.61 km^{2} (6.80 sq mi)

Population (2010)
  - Total: 313,814
  - Density: 17,820/km^{2} (46,150/sq mi)
- Demonym: 서대문구민 (Seodaemun gumin)
- Time zone: UTC+9 (Korea Standard Time)
- Postal code: 03600 – 03899
- Area code: +82-2,300,700,3150~
- Flower: Rose
- Tree: Pine tree
- Bird: Korean magpie
- Website: Seodaemun District official website

Korean name
- Hangul: 서대문구
- Hanja: 西大門區
- RR: Seodaemun-gu
- MR: Sŏdaemun-gu

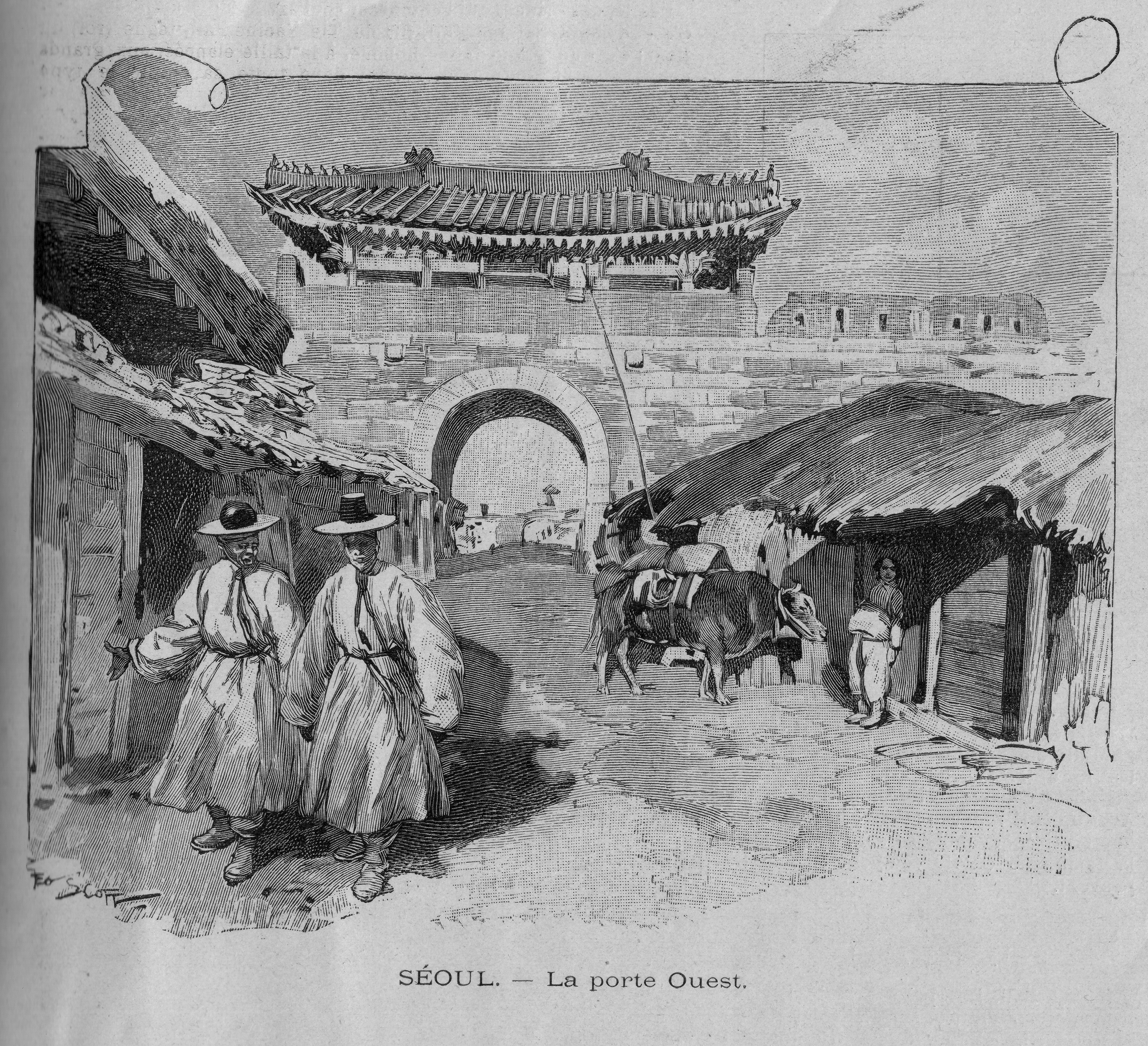
A sketch of the Seodaemun (Great West Gate) around 1894.

Seodaemun District (Korean: 서대문구) is one of the 25 districts of Seoul, South Korea. It has a population of 313,814 (2010) and has a geographic area of 17.61 km^{2} (6.8 sq mi), and is divided into 14 dong (administrative neighborhoods). Seodaemun is located in northwestern Seoul, bordering the city districts of Eunpyeong to the northwest, Mapo to the southwest, Jung to the southeast, and Jongno to the east.

Seodaemun is part of the Seongjeosimni (Outer old Seoul) area and is named after Donuimun, one of the Eight Gates of Seoul which was formerly located within the district. Seodaemun is home to Seodaemun Independence Park, which contains several historic monuments and buildings such as the Seodaemun Prison museum and the Independence Gate.

== Administrative divisions ==
Administrative divisions

Seodaemun District consists of 14 "administrative dong"s (haengjeong-dong 행정동).

- Sinchon-dong (신촌동 新村洞)
  - Daesin-dong (대신동 大新洞)
  - Bongwon-dong (봉원동 奉元洞)
  - Daehyeon-dong (대현동 大峴洞)
  - Changcheon-dong (창천동 滄川洞)
- Bukgajwa-dong (북가좌동 北加佐洞) 1~2
- Bugahyeon-dong (북아현동 北阿峴洞)
- Cheonyeon-dong (천연동 天然洞)
  - Hyeonjeo-dong (현저동 峴底洞)
  - Naengcheon-dong (냉천동 冷泉洞)
  - Yeongcheon-dong (영천동 靈泉洞)
  - Okcheon-dong (옥천동 玉川洞)
- Chunghyeon-dong (충현동 忠峴洞)
  - Chungjeongno-dong (충정로동 忠正路洞)
  - Hap-dong (합동 蛤洞)
  - Migeun-dong (미근동 渼芹洞)
- Hongeun-dong (홍은동 弘恩洞) 1~2
- Hongje-dong (홍제동 弘濟洞) 1~3
- Namgajwa-dong (남가좌동 南加佐洞) 1~2
- Yeonhui-dong (연희동 延禧洞)

== Infrastructure ==
- Total length of roads: 308 km
- Pavement area: 2,641 km
- Waterworks system: 589 km
- Sewerage system: 396 km

== Government and infrastructure ==
At one time the Korean Maritime Safety Tribunal (KMST) had its headquarters in the district.

== Education ==
Seobu District Office of Education under the Seoul Metropolitan Office of Education operates public schools in Seodaemun District.

- Hansung Science High School - 279–79, Tongil-ro (Hyeonjeo-dong)
  - Hongeun Middle School - 94, Yeonhui-ro 41-gil (Hongeun 2-dong)
  - Inwang Middle School - 69, Segeomjeong-ro 4-gil (Hongje-dong)
  - Seoyun Middle School - 9–6, Yeonhui-ro 11ma-gil (Yeonhui-dong)
  - Sinyeon Middle School - 408, Moraenae-ro (Yeonhui-dong)
  - Yeonbuk Middle School - 32, Yeonhui-ro 36-gil (Yeonhui-dong)
  - Yonhi Middle School - 170, Jeungga-ro (Namgajwa-dong)
    - Ansan Elementary School - 321, Tongil-ro (Hongje-dong)
    - Bukgajwa Elementary School - 20, Geobukgol-ro 19-gil (Bukgajwa-dong)
    - Buksung Elementary School - 84, Bugahyeon-ro 5na-gil (Bugahyeon-dong)
    - Changsea Elementary School - 30–3, Yonsei-ro 5na-gil (Changcheon-dong)
    - Daesin Elementary School - 27, Ewhayeodae 2-gil (Daesin-dong)
    - Geumhwa Elementary School - 165, Tongil-ro (Cheonyeon-dong)
    - Goeun Elementary School - 441, Moraenae-ro (Hongje-dong)
    - Hongeun Elementary School - 105, Segeomjeong-ro (Hongje-dong)
    - Hongje Elementary School - 13, Hongeunjungang-ro (Hongeun-dong)
    - Hongyeon Elementary School - 55, Baekryeonsa-gil (Hongeun-dong)
    - Inwang Elementary School - 33–9, Semuseo-gil (Hongje-dong)
    - Midong Elementary School - 52, Chungjeong-ro (Migeun-dong)
    - Yeonga Elementary School - 49–50, Jeungga-ro 12ga-gil (Namgajwa-dong)
    - Yeonhui Elementary School - 136, Yeonhui-ro (Yeonhui-dong)

There are also numerous private institutions in Seodaemun District offering education for primary and secondary levels.

- Ewha Womans University High School
- Hanseong High School
- Inchang High School
- Jungang Girls High School
- Myongji High School
  - Dongmyung Girls Middle School
  - Ewha Womans University Middle School
  - Hanseong Middle School
  - Inchang Middle School
  - Jungang Girls Middle School
  - Jungwon Girls Middle School
  - Myongji Middle School
    - Chugye Elementary School
    - Ewha Womans University Elementary School
    - Kyonggi Elementary School
    - Myongji Elementary School

Private primary and secondary schools:

- Seoul Overseas Chinese High School
- Seoul Foreign School

Private institutions offering higher education in Seodaemun District are Chugye University for the Arts, Ewha Womans University, Kyonggi University, Methodist Theological University, Myongji College, Myongji University, Seoul School of Integrated Sciences & Technologies, Seoul Women's College of Nursing, and Yonsei University.

Seodaemun District also has a public library called Lee Jin Ah Memorial Library. The construction of the library was made possible through a generous donation by the parents of the namesake Lee. Lee's Parents, after losing Lee in a tragic lethal accident, wanted to commemorate the life of their daughter who enjoyed reading. Since the opening on Lee's anniversary in 2005, the main library now has approximately over 76,000 books.

== Facilities ==
- Public Institutions - total 84 (1 Seodaemun-gu Office, 21 Dong offices, 1 Korean National Police Agency, 1 police station, 16 police boxes, 4 fire stations, 10 post offices, 30 others)
- Schools - total 46 (8 universities, 6 high schools, 12 middle schools, 18 elementary schools, 2 foreign schools)
- Medical Facilities- total 402 (2 General Hospitals, 317 hospitals and clinics including dental clinics, 83 oriental clinics)
- Official Cultural Assets: total 32 (1 national treasure, 10 treasures, 6 historic sites, 4 important intangible cultural properties, 3 folklore materials, 8 tangible and intangible cultural properties
- Welfare facilities: total 308 (3 social welfare centers, 173 childcare centers, 86 facilities for the aged, 36 others including study rooms)

== Government and infrastructure ==
The Korean National Police Agency has its headquarters in Migeun-dong, Seodaemun District.

== Attractions ==
The district covers 17.6 square kilometers, approximately 2.9% of the total area of Seoul. Seodaemun District is populated by middle and upper-income families.

Seodaemun District incorporates residential areas and historical areas including Bongwon Temple, Sinchon Railway Station (the oldest train station in Seoul) and Seodaemun Prison History Hall. Also it has a historic culture site "Seodaemun Independence Park." This place located at Dongnimmun station, includes a 3.1 independence memorial statue, Independence Gate and more. This educational park is a major tourist attraction of Seodaemun District. Seodaemun District is a Rest Place together with nature surrounded by Mt. Ansan, Mt. Baengnyeonsan and Hongjecheon stream in the city. Also known as Mt. Muaksan, Mt. Ansan has many steep slopes, but because it has an altitude of only 295.5m, it is a favorite hiking trail among locals. There are about ten climbing courses. At the summit, there is Ansan Beacon Mound, with views of Mt. Bukhansan, Mt. Inwangsan, Haegjusanseong Fortress and Hangang River. Mt. Ansan is a highly popular tourist attraction of Seodaemun District. Also, on the Mt. Ansan path, the Seodaemun Museum of Natural History, built by the local governing body, exhibits various geological and biological relics and records. Named after Hongjewon, which was where Chinese envoys were greet and entertained, Hongjecheon Stream was where the women who were forcefully taken to the Qing Dynasty cleansed their bodies upon returning home. The once dried stream was restored and today there is a musical fountain, a water mill, a man-made waterfall and hiking trails.

There are shopping streets for the young, "Walking street" in Sinchon and "Fashion street" near Ewha Womans University. The area has a 66m^{2} store of Korean cosmetics brand Skin Food, which has been opened since June 2004 in Changcheon-dong and it also sells Traditional Korean medicine or hanbang.

- Bongwonsa Buddhist temple
- Dongnimmun
- Dream Cinema
- Seodaemun Prison History Hall
- Sinchon-dong
- Seodaemun Museum of Natural History

== Sister cities ==
- Haidian, China
- Mokpo, South Korea

== Notable people from Seodaemun District ==
- Kim Jae-kyung (김재경), singer, dancer, model, actress and K-pop idol, leader and member of K-pop girlgroup Rainbow and its sub-unit Rainbow Blaxx
- Yoon Seok-youl, South Korean lawyer, prosecutor, former Prosecutor General of South Korea, and former President of South Korea.
- Kim Tae-won, South Korean rock musician, leader and member of K-rock band Boohwal
- Bobby, born Kim Ji-win, South Korean rapper and member of K-pop group IKon.
