= Chungjeongno-dong =

- Country: South Korea

Area
  - Total: 0.51 km^{2} (0.20 sq mi)

Population (2001)
  - Total: 8,729
  - Density: 17,000/km^{2} (44,000/sq mi)

Korean name
- Hangul: 충정로동
- Hanja: 忠正路洞
- RR: Chungjeongno-dong
- MR: Ch'ungjŏngno-dong

Chungjeongno-dong (Korean: 충정로동) is a dong (neighborhood) of Seodaemun District, Seoul, South Korea.

== Subway ==
Chungjeongno-dong has two subway stations called Chungjeongno Station, which are Seoul Subway Line 2 and Seoul Subway Line 2. These two subway lines allow people to travel everywhere in city of Seoul.

== Notable Places ==
- Mi-dong Elementary school - Mi-Dong is one of the earliest elementary school established in South Korea. The school was established in 1895, started as a primary school and changed its format to Elementary school and had its first graduation in 1906
- Korean Salvation Army Building - cost of construction was estimated to 50 Million. Many criticisms are being targeted to its organization and the fundings of the construction.

== See also ==
- Administrative divisions of South Korea
