= Cheonyeon-dong =

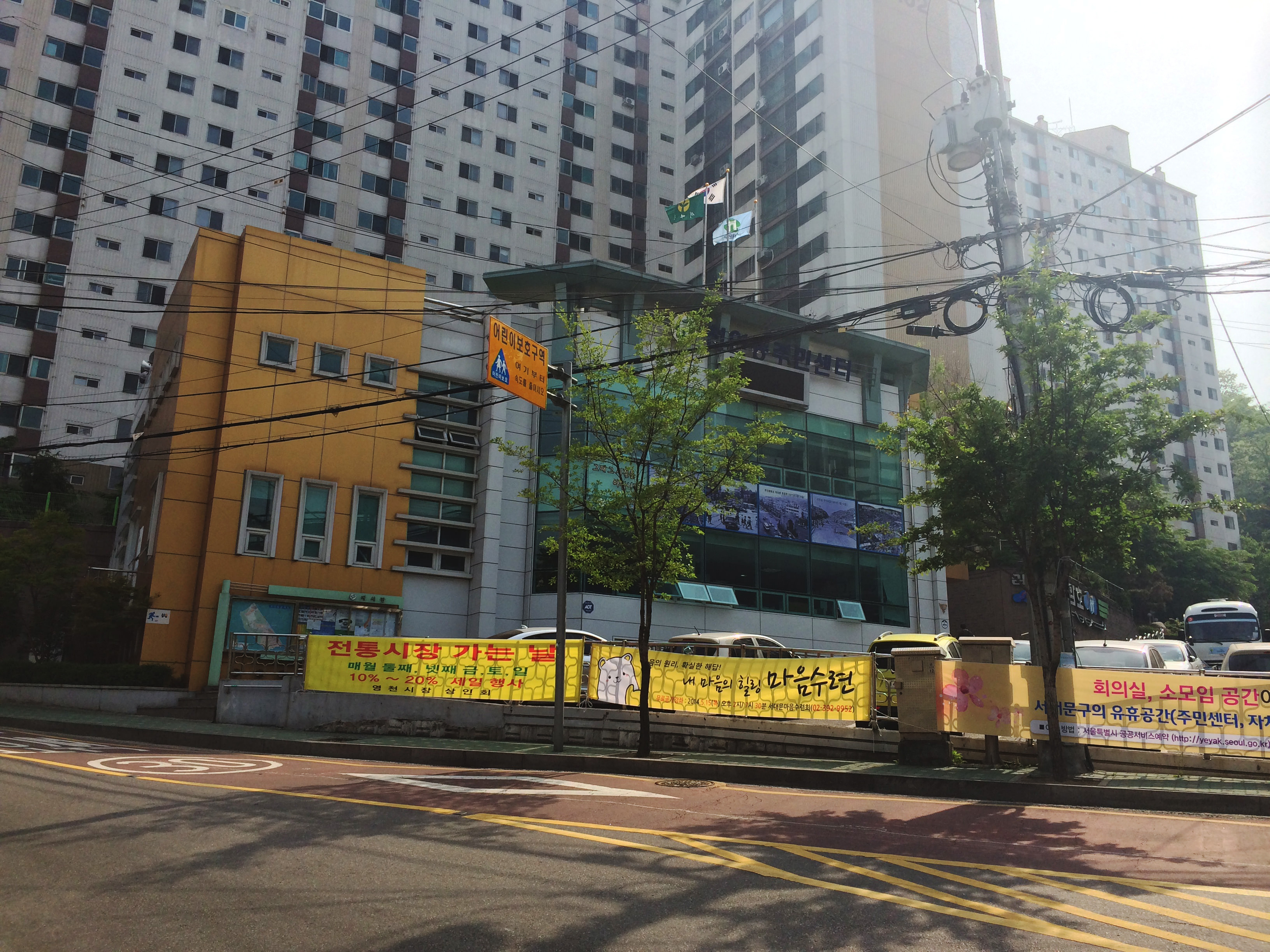
- Cheonyeon-dong Community Service Center
- Interactive map of Cheonyeon-dong
- Coordinates: 37.568°N 126.959°E
- Country: South Korea

Area
  - Total: 0.97 km^{2} (0.37 sq mi)

Population (2008)
  - Total: 19,492
  - Density: 20,000/km^{2} (52,000/sq mi)

Korean name
- Hangul: 천연동
- Hanja: 天然洞
- RR: Cheonyeon-dong
- MR: Ch'ŏnyŏn-dong

Cheonyeon-dong (Korean: 천연동) is a dong (neighborhood) of Seodaemun District, Seoul, South Korea.

== Overview ==
The area was named after Cheonyeonjeong, a pavilion that was built in the 17th year of King Yeongjo's reign (1741) during the Joseon Dynasty. The pavilion served as the site where government officials traveling to and from Muakjae Pass were formally welcomed and seen off.

In 1911, the area was known as Ipan-dong and Seokgyo-dong. In 1914, it was renamed Cheonyeon-dong.

In 1975, most of the area west of Uiju-ro that had previously belonged to Gyoam-dong was incorporated into Cheonyeon-dong.

== See also ==
- Administrative divisions of South Korea
