= Dongbuk Line =

Future metro line in Seoul, South Korea

Overview
- Native name: 서울 경전철 동북선 (東北線)
- Status: Under construction
- Owner: Seoul Metropolitan Government
- Termini: Wangsimni; Sanggye
- Stations: 16

Service
- Operator(s): Dongbuk LRT Co., Ltd.
- Depot(s): Buramsan Train Depot

History
- Planned opening: November 2027

Technical
- Line length: 13.4 km (8.3 mi)

The Dongbuk Line (Korean: 동북선; Hanja: 東北線) is a future LRT line of the Seoul Metropolitan Subway, scheduled to open in November 2027. Construction began in October 2019.

== Stations ==
Station Number	Station Name English	Station Name Hangul	Station Name Hanja	Transfer	Distance in km	Total Distance	Location	
S301	Wangsimni (Seongdong-gu Office)	왕십리 (성동구청)	往十里 (城東區廳)	Gyeongui–Jungang Line Suin–Bundang Line	---	0.0	Seoul	Seongdong-gu
S302	Dongmyeongchogyo	동명초교	東明初校		0.92	0.92	Seoul	Seongdong-gu
S303	Jegi-dong	제기동	祭基洞	Seoul Subway Line 1	0.97	1.89	Seoul	Dongdaemun-gu
S304	Korea University (Jongam)	고려대 (종암)	高麗大 (鐘岩)	Seoul Subway Line 6	1.25	3.14	Seoul	Dongdaemun-gu
S305	Jongam Post Office	종암우체국	鍾岩郵遞局		0.67	3.81	Seoul	Seongbuk-gu
S306	Jongam Police	종암경찰서	鍾岩警察署		0.82	4.63	Seoul	Seongbuk-gu
S307	Miasageori	미아사거리	彌阿사거리	Seoul Subway Line 4	0.62	5.25	Seoul	Seongbuk-gu
S308	Jangwi	장위	長位		0.83	6.08	Seoul	Seongbuk-gu
S309	North Seoul Dream Forest	북서울꿈의숲	北서울꿈의숲		0.97	7.05	Seoul	Seongbuk-gu
S310	Uicheon	우이천	牛耳川		0.86	7.91	Seoul	Nowon-gu
S311	Wolgye	월계	月溪	Seoul Subway Line 1	1.18	9.09	Seoul	Nowon-gu
S312	Hagye	하계	下溪	Seoul Subway Line 7	0.74	9.83	Seoul	Nowon-gu
S313	Seoul Science Center	서울시립과학관	서울市立科學館		0.70	10.53	Seoul	Nowon-gu
S314	Eunhaengsageori	은행사거리	銀杏四거리		1.32	11.85	Seoul	Nowon-gu
S315	Buramsan	불암산	佛巖山		0.66	11.85	Seoul	Nowon-gu
S316	Sanggye	상계	上溪	Seoul Subway Line 4	0.74	13.25	Seoul	Nowon-gu
