= Bomun station =

Station of the Seoul Metropolitan Subway

보문; Bomun
L12
보문
Bomun
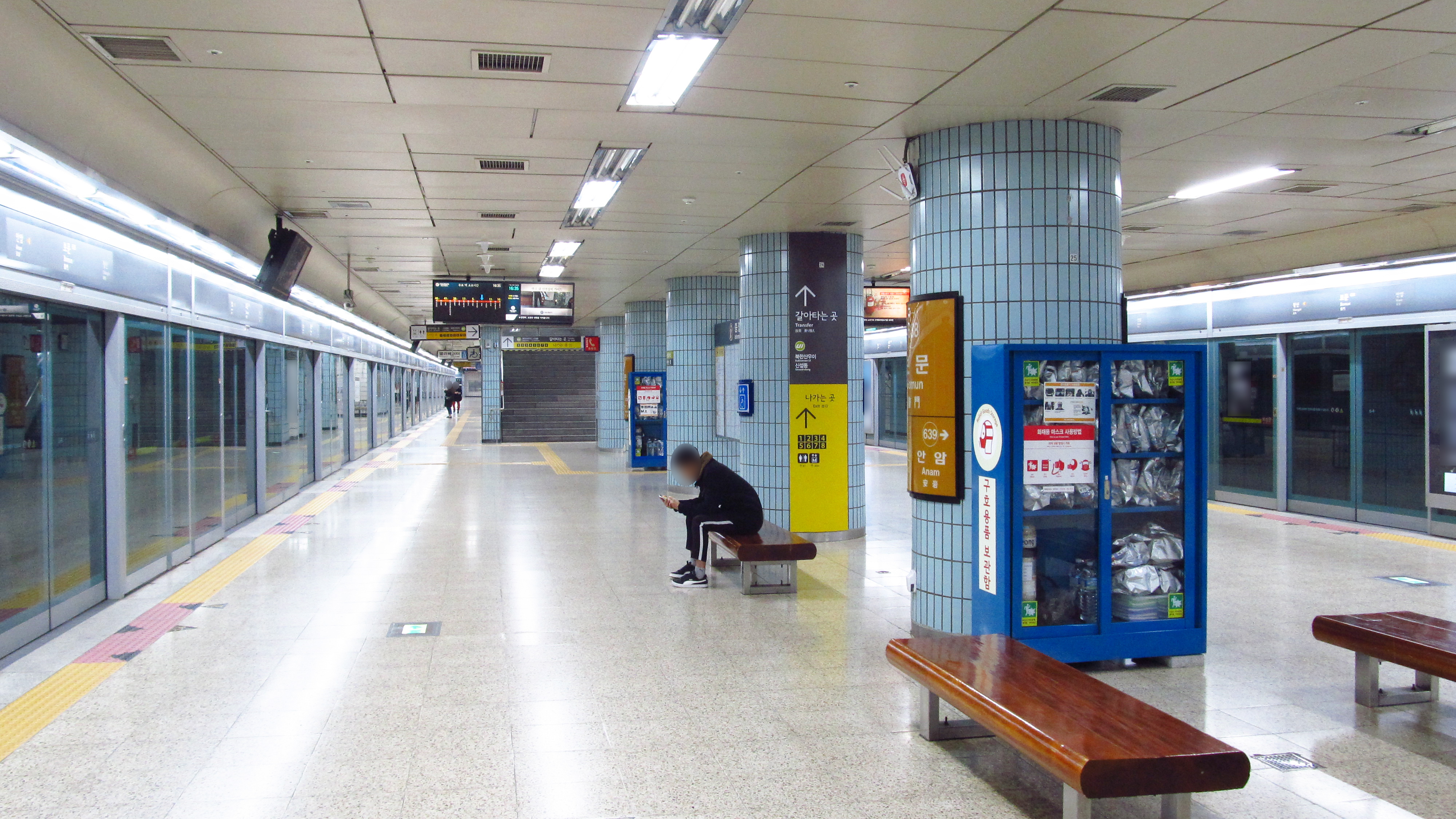

Korean name
- Hangul: 보문역
- Hanja: 普門驛
- Revised Romanization: Bomunnyeok
- McCune–Reischauer: Pomunnyŏk

General information
- Location: 127-1 Bomun-dong 1-ga, 115 Bomunno, Seongbuk-gu, Seoul
- Coordinates: 37°35′08″N 127°01′11″E
- Operator: Seoul Metro; UiTrans LRT Co., Ltd.
- Lines: Line 6 Ui LRT
- Platforms: 1
- Tracks: 2

Construction
- Structure type: Underground

Key dates
- December 15, 2000: Line 6 opened
- September 2, 2017: Ui LRT opened
Services
Preceding station	Seoul Metropolitan Subway	Following station
Changsin towards Eungam	Line 6	Anam towards Sinnae
Sungshin Women's University towards Bukhansan Ui	Ui LRT	Sinseol-dong Terminus
Location

Bomun Station is a railway station on Seoul Subway Line 6 and Ui LRT in Seongbuk District, Seoul, South Korea.

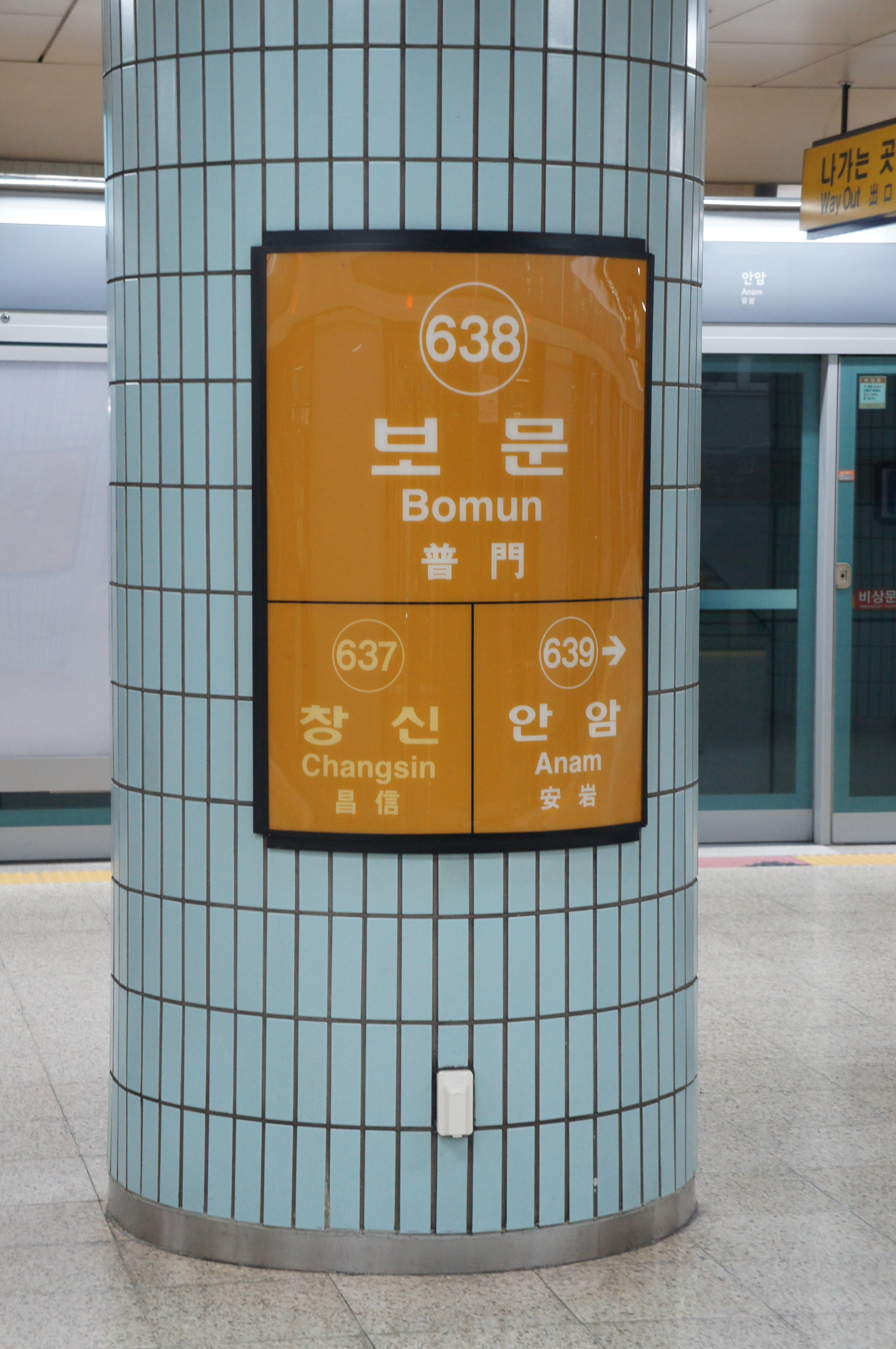
Line 6 station sign

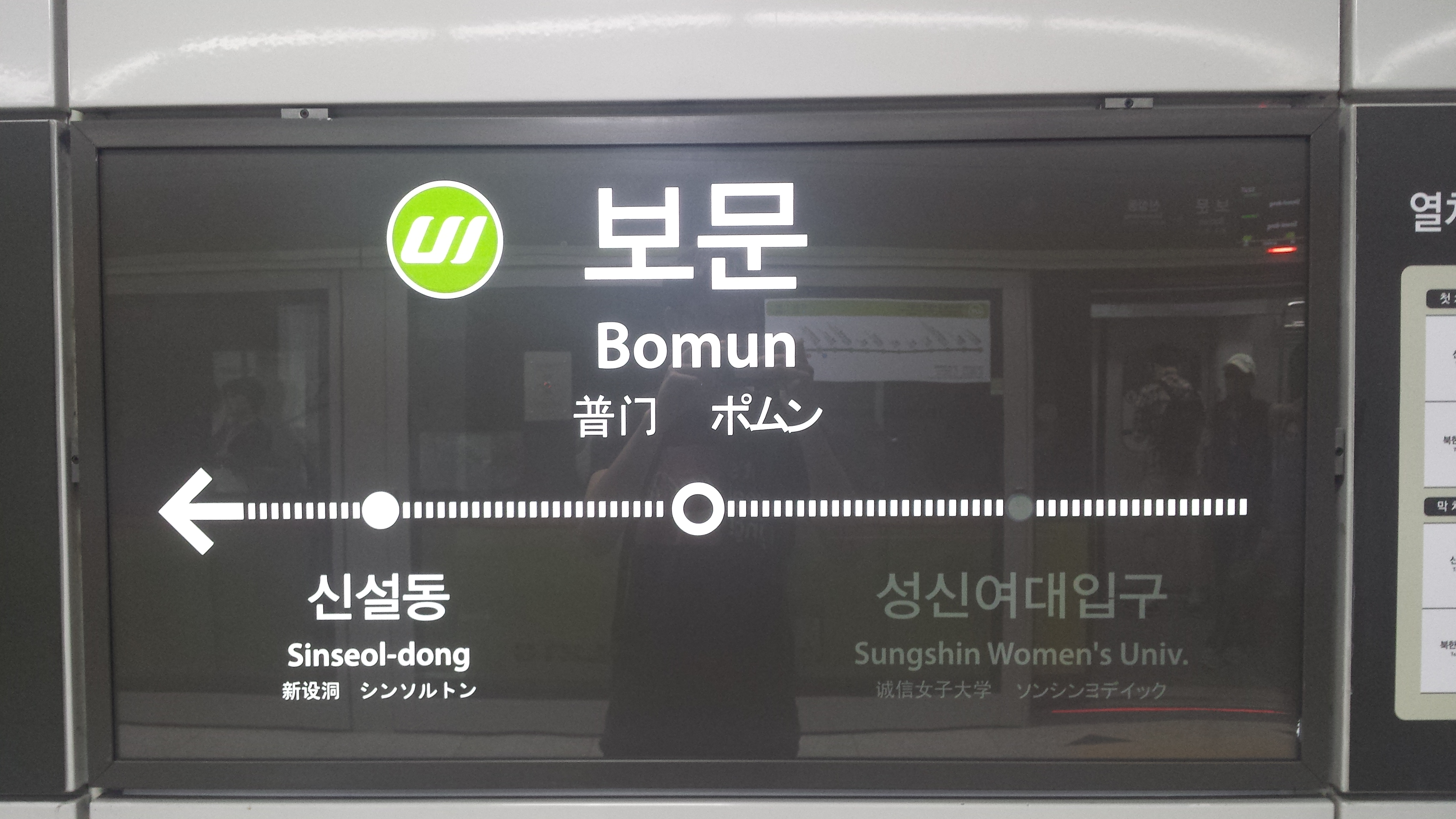
Ui LRT station sign

== Station layout ==
G	Street level	Exit

L1; Concourse	Lobby	Customer Service, Shops, Vending machines, ATMs

L2; Platform level	Westbound	← Line 6 toward Eungam (Changsin)
L2; Platform level	Island platform, doors will open on the left
L2; Platform level	Eastbound	Line 6 toward Sinnae (Anam) →
