= Wolgok station =

Station of the Seoul Metropolitan Subway

월곡 (동덕여대); Wolgok (Dongduk Women's Univ.)
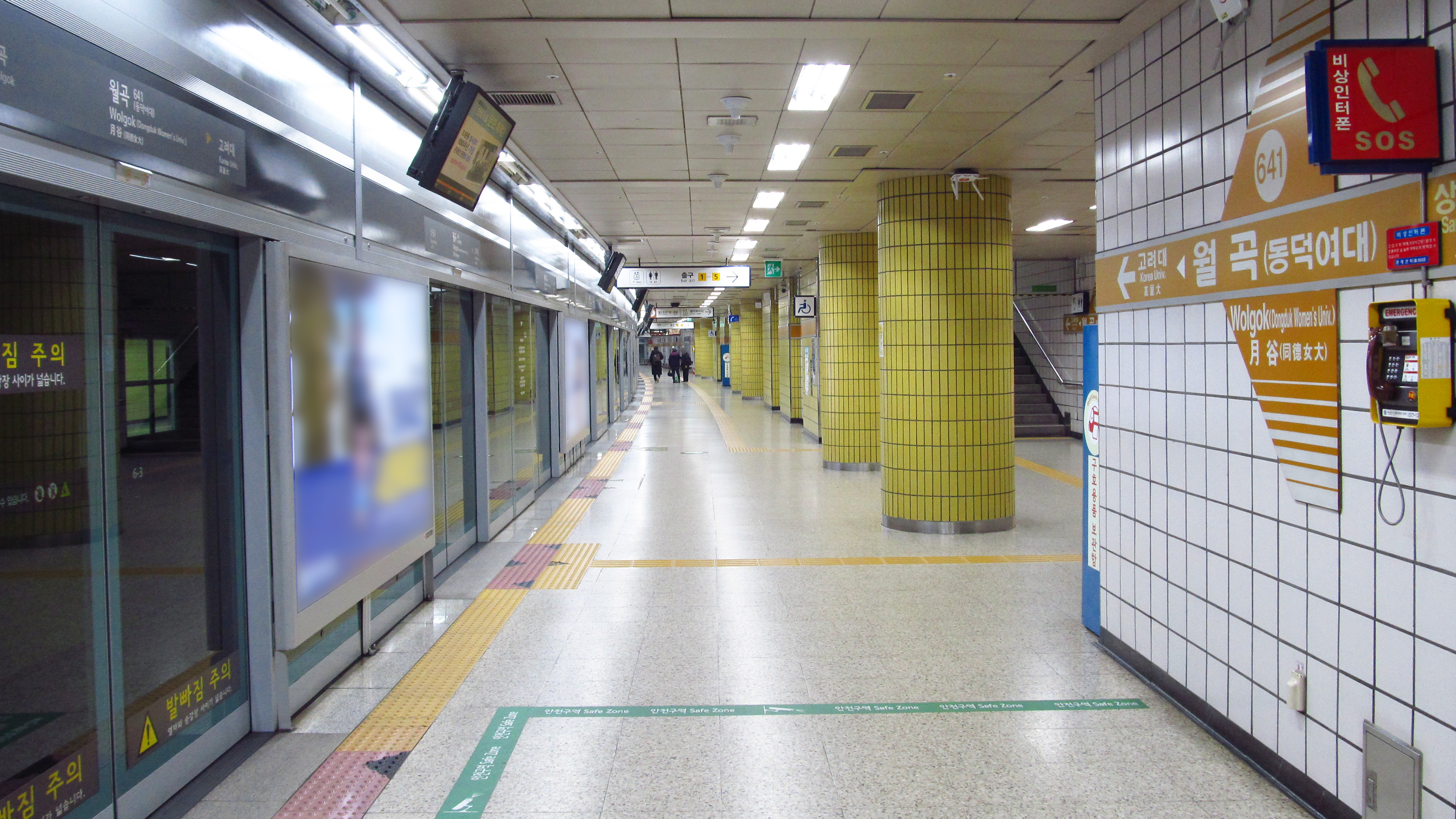

Korean name
- Hangul: 월곡역
- Hanja: 月谷驛
- Revised Romanization: Wolgongnyeok
- McCune–Reischauer: Wŏlgongnyŏk

General information
- Location: 35-1 Hawolgok-dong, 107 Wolgongno, Seongbuk-gu, Seoul
- Coordinates: 37°36′07″N 127°02′30″E
- Operated by: Seoul Metro
- Line(s): Line 6
- Platforms: 2
- Tracks: 2

Construction
- Structure type: Underground

Key dates
- December 15, 2000: Line 6 opened

Wolgok station is a railway station on Seoul Subway Line 6 located in Hawolgok-dong, Seongbuk-gu, Seoul. Its station subname is Dongduk Women's University, as it is within the vicinity of Dongduk Women's University.

== Station layout ==
G	Street level	Exit

L1; Concourse	Lobby	Customer service, shops, vending machines, ATMs

L2; Platform level	Side platform, doors will open on the right
L2; Platform level	Westbound	← Line 6 toward Eungam (Korea University)
L2; Platform level	Eastbound	Line 6 toward Sinnae (Sangwolgok) →
L2; Platform level	Side platform, doors will open on the right

Preceding station	Seoul Metropolitan Subway	Following station
Korea University towards Eungam	Line 6	Sangwolgok towards Sinnae
