= Anam station =

Station of the Seoul Metropolitan Subway

Coordinates: 37°35′11″N 127°01′45″E

안암 (고대병원앞); Anam (Korea Univ. Hospital)
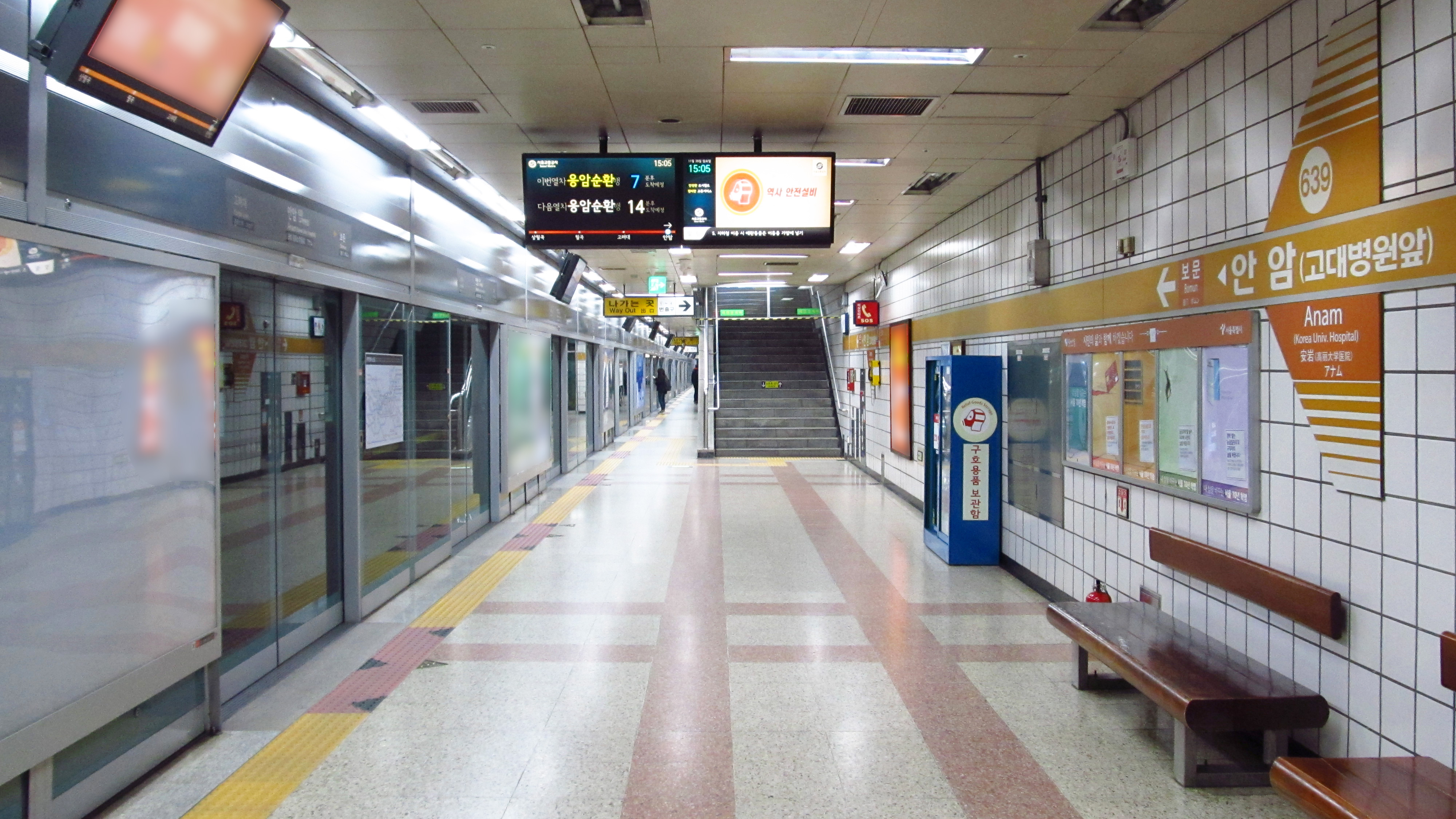
- Station platform

Korean name
- Hangul: 안암역
- Hanja: 安岩驛
- RR: Anam-yeok
- MR: Anam-yŏk

General information
- Location: 101-84 Anam-dong 5-ga, 89 Goryeodaero Jiha, Seongbuk-gu, Seoul
- Operator: Seoul Metro
- Line: Line 6
- Platforms: 2
- Tracks: 2

Construction
- Structure type: Underground

Key dates
- December 15, 2000: Line 6 opened
Location

Anam station (Korean: 안암; Hanja: 安岩), which has the subname Korea University Hospital (고대병원앞), is a subway station on the Line 6 of the Seoul Metropolitan Subway. The station is located between the Korea University Anam Campus and the Korea University Anam Hospital.

== Station layout ==
G	Street level	Exit

L1; Concourse	Lobby	Customer Service, Shops, Vending machines, ATMs

L2; Platform level	Westbound	← Line 6 toward Eungam (Bomun)
L2; Platform level	Side platform, doors will open on the right
L2; Platform level	Eastbound	Line 6 toward Sinnae (Korea University) →

== Vicinity ==
- Exit 1 : Korea University Anam Hospital & Life Sciences Campus, Sungshin Women's University
- Exit 2 : Korea University Humanities & Social Sciences Campus
- Exit 3 : Anam ogeori (5-way intersection), Jongam Elementary School
- Exit 4 : Korea University Natural Sciences & Engineering Campus

== Gallery ==
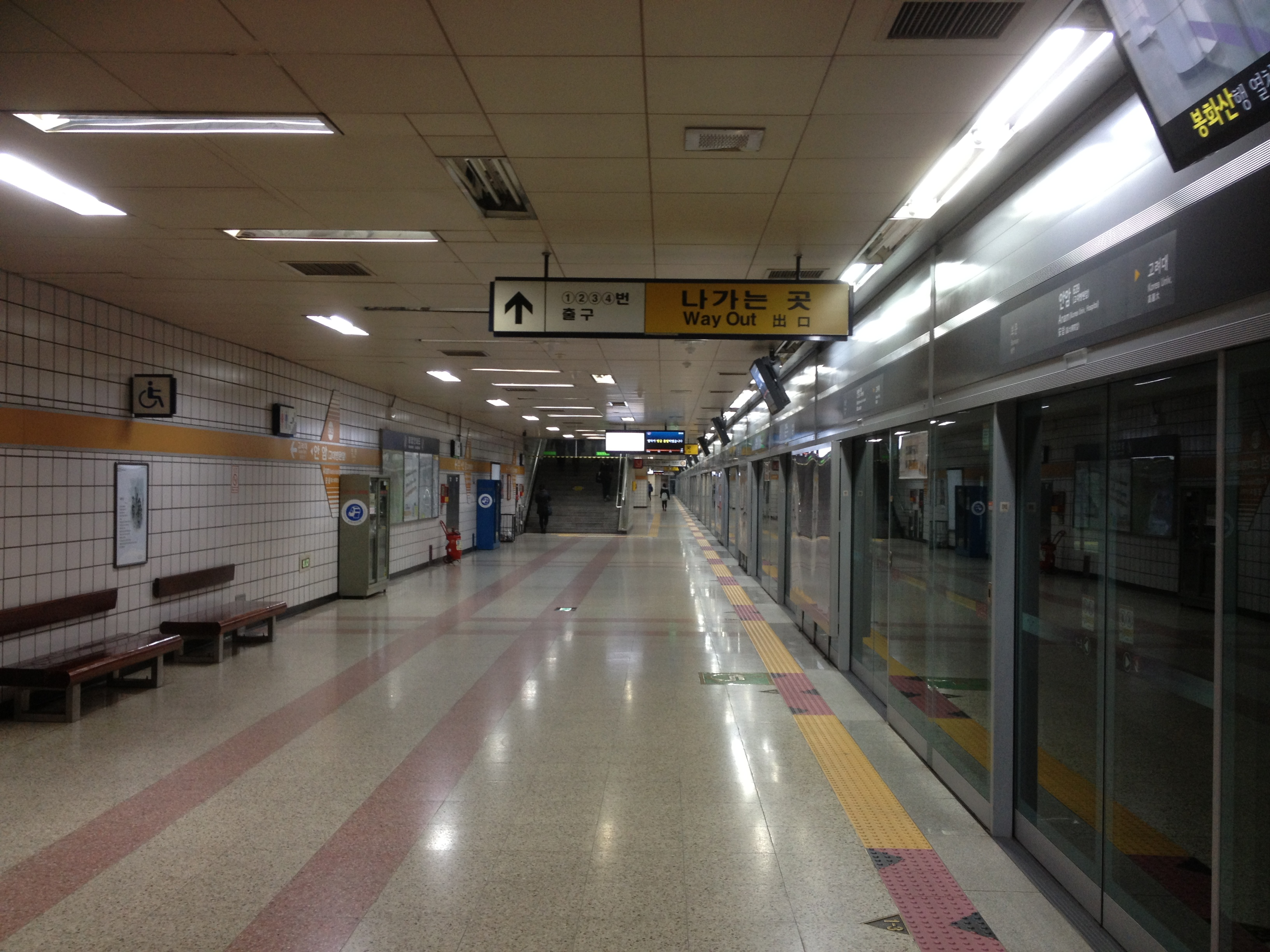
An Anam Station platform in 2012

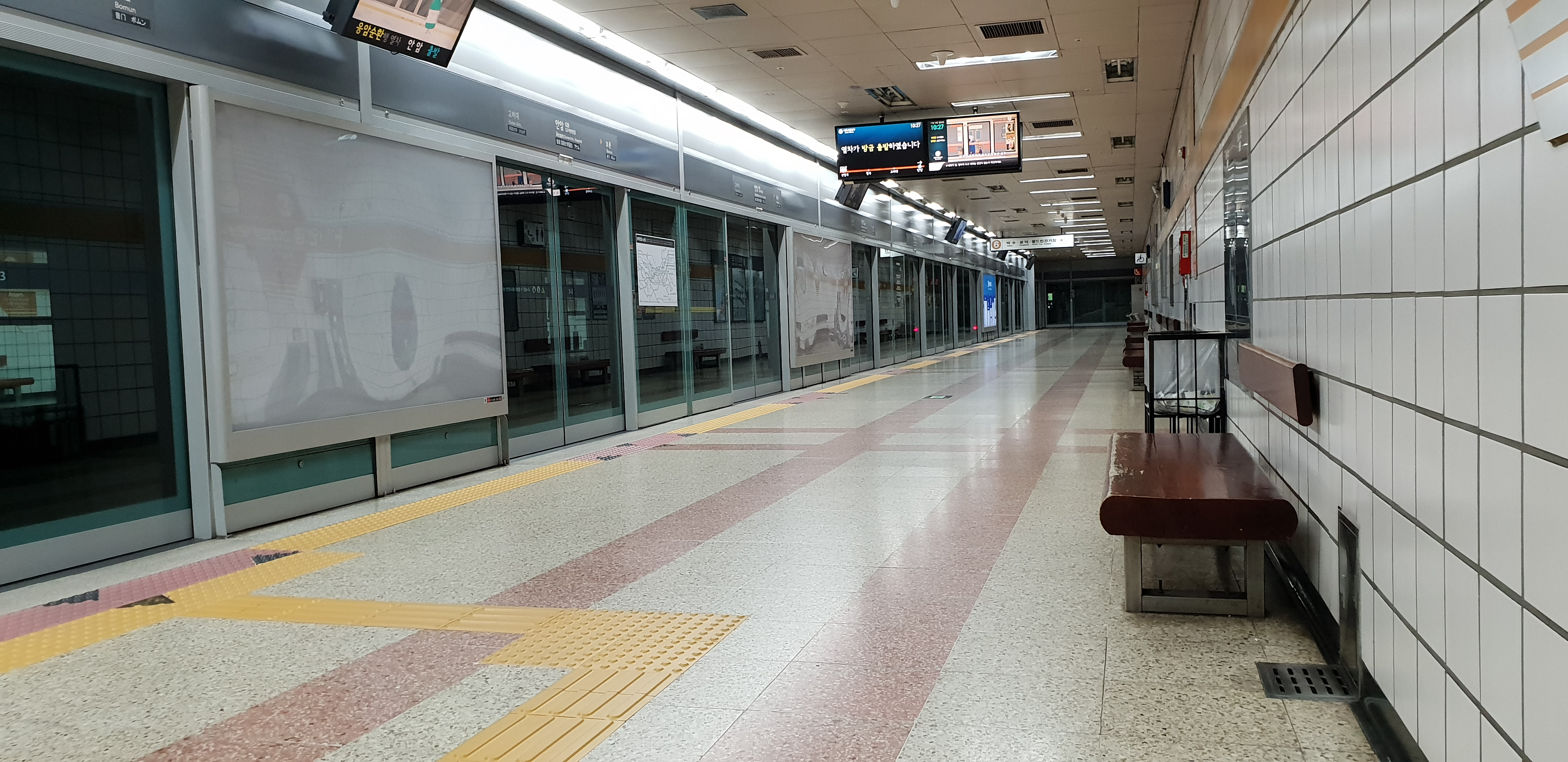
An Anam Station platform in 2018

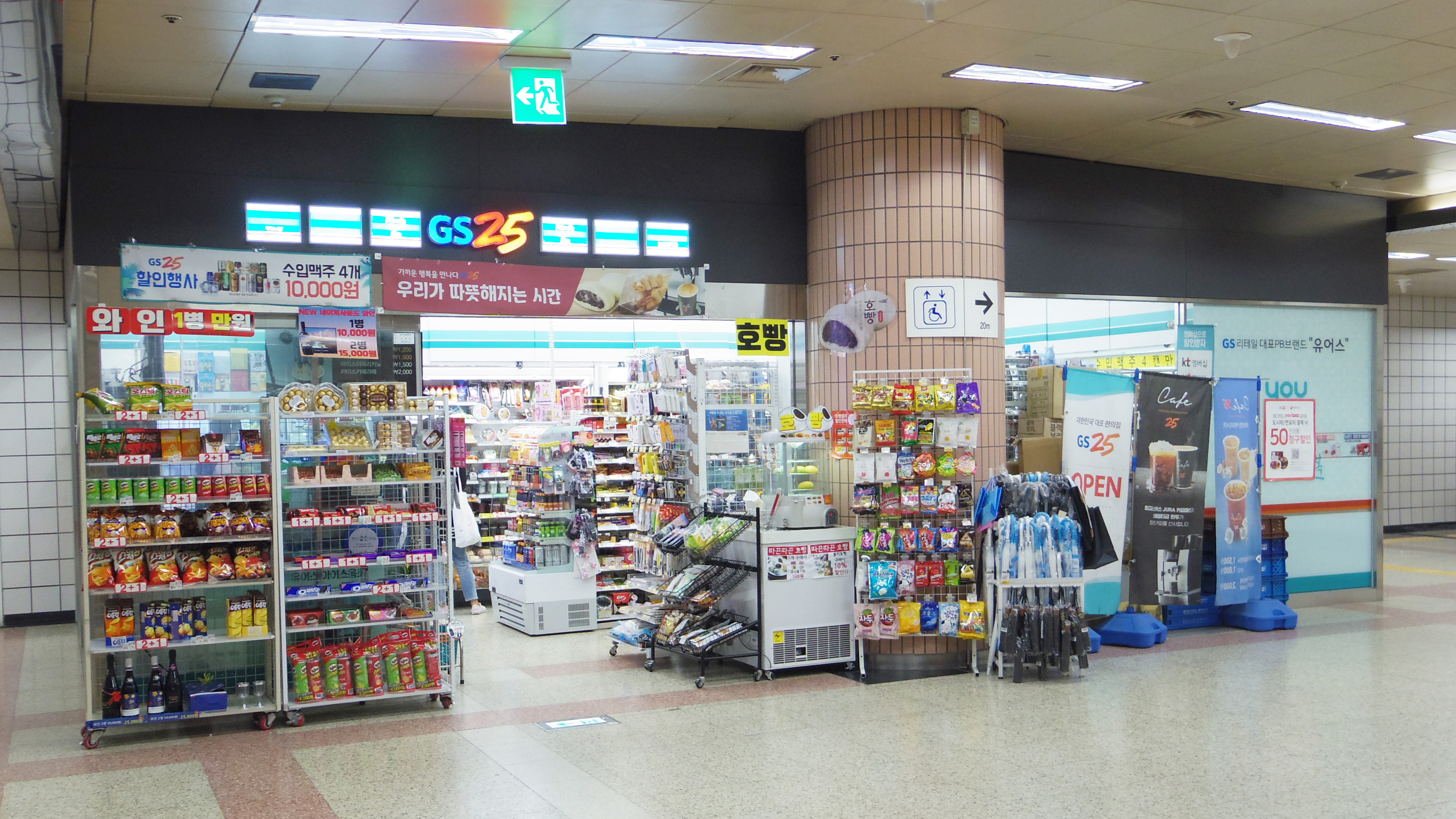
A shop in Anam Station 2018

Preceding station	Seoul Metropolitan Subway	Following station
Bomun towards Eungam	Line 6	Korea University towards Sinnae
