= Sangwolgok station =

Metro station in South Korea

| 상월곡 (한국과학기술연구원); Sangwolgok (KIST) |
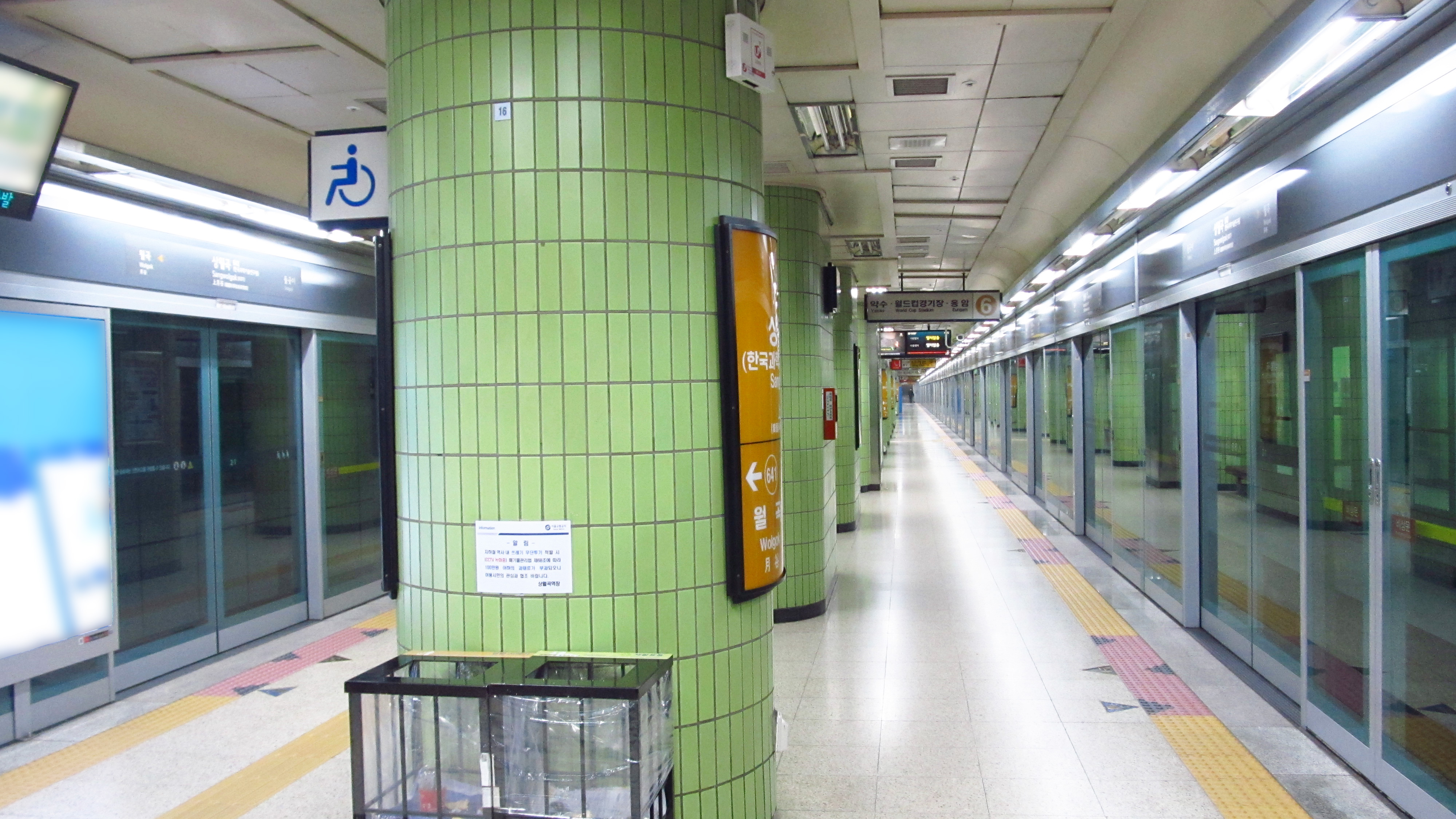

Korean name
- Hangul: 상월곡역
- Hanja: 上月谷驛
- Revised Romanization: Sangwolgongnyeok
- McCune–Reischauer: Sangwŏlgongnyŏk

General information
- Location: 26-1 Sangwolgok-dong, 157 Hwarangno, Seongbuk-gu, Seoul
- Coordinates: 37°36′23″N 127°02′54″E
- Operated by: Seoul Metro
- Line: Line 6
- Platforms: 2
- Tracks: 3

Construction
- Structure type: Underground

Key dates
- August 7, 2000: Line 6 opened
Location

Sangwolgok Station is a railway station on Seoul Subway Line 6 in Seongbuk-gu, Seoul. The Korea Institute of Science and Technology is near this station.

== Station layout ==
Sangwolgok's layout is unusual. It has two platforms, but both of its active tracks go on the outside of the platforms. A third track runs between the platforms, splitting the island in two. This irregular layout is due to plans to make Sangwolgok a passing loop to cut down travel times falling through.

| G | Street level | Exit |

| L1; Concourse | Lobby | Customer Service, Shops, Vending machines, ATMs |

| L2; Platform level | Westbound | ← Line 6 toward Eungam (Wolgok) |
| L2; Platform level | Island platform, doors will open on the left, right |
| L2; Platform level | Center track | No Service |
| L2; Platform level | Island platform, doors will open on the left |
| L2; Platform level | Eastbound | Line 6 toward Sinnae (Dolgoji) → |

| Preceding station | Seoul Metropolitan Subway | Following station |
|---|---|---|
| Wolgok towards Eungam | Line 6 | Dolgoji towards Sinnae |
