= Jongam-dong =

Jongam-dong 종암동
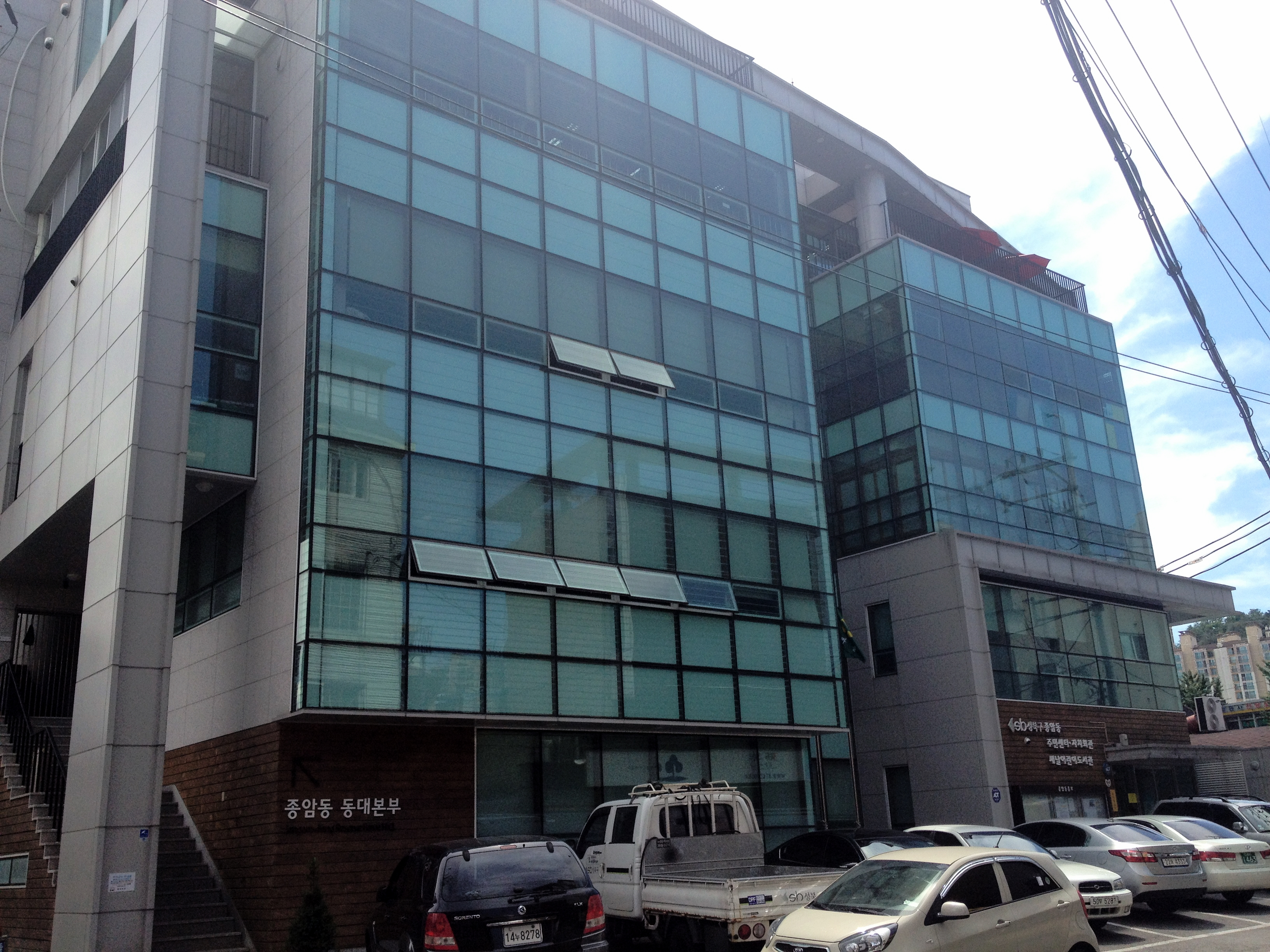
- Seongbuk Jongam-dong Community Service Center
- Interactive map of Jongam-dong
- Country: South Korea

Area
  - Total: 1.46 km^{2} (0.56 sq mi)

Population (2001)
  - Total: 38,366
  - Density: 26,300/km^{2} (68,100/sq mi)

Korean name
- Hangul: 종암동
- Hanja: 鍾岩洞
- RR: Jongam-dong
- MR: Chongam-dong

Jongam-dong (Korean: 종암동) is a dong, neighbourhood of Seongbuk District, Seoul, South Korea.

== Demographic data and population characteristics ==
The demographic structure of Jeongam-dong is characterized by several unique features related to the urban nature of the neighborhood. Statistical data recorded for the neighborhood indicates that the number of males reaches 19,787, while the number of females is 21,158.

== See also ==
- Administrative divisions of South Korea
