= Dongseon-dong =

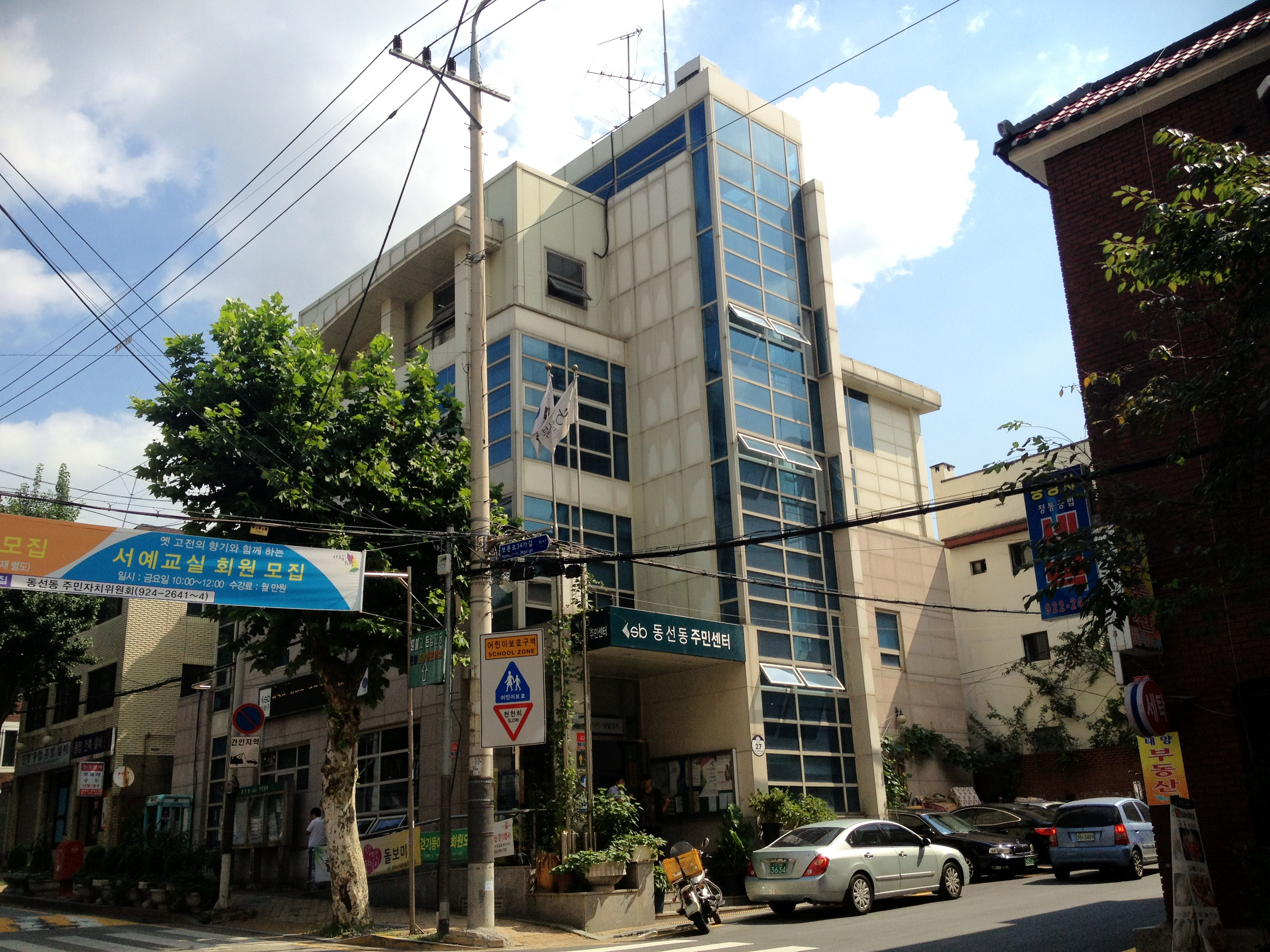
- Dongseon-dong 4-ga Dongseon-dong Community Service Center
- Interactive map of Dongseon-dong
- Coordinates: 37.594°N 127.018°E
- Country: South Korea

Area
  - Total: 0.73 km^{2} (0.28 sq mi)

Population (2001)
  - Total: 15,531
  - Density: 21,000/km^{2} (55,000/sq mi)

Korean name
- Hangul: 동선동
- Hanja: 東仙洞
- RR: Dongseon-dong
- MR: Tongsŏn-dong

Dongseon-dong (Korean: 동선동) is a dong in the district of Seongbuk District, in Seoul, South Korea.

== Notable places ==
- Sungshin Women's University
- Sungshin Women's University station
- Seongbuk stream

== See also ==
- Administrative divisions of South Korea
