= Samcheonggak =

Resort in Seoul, South Korea

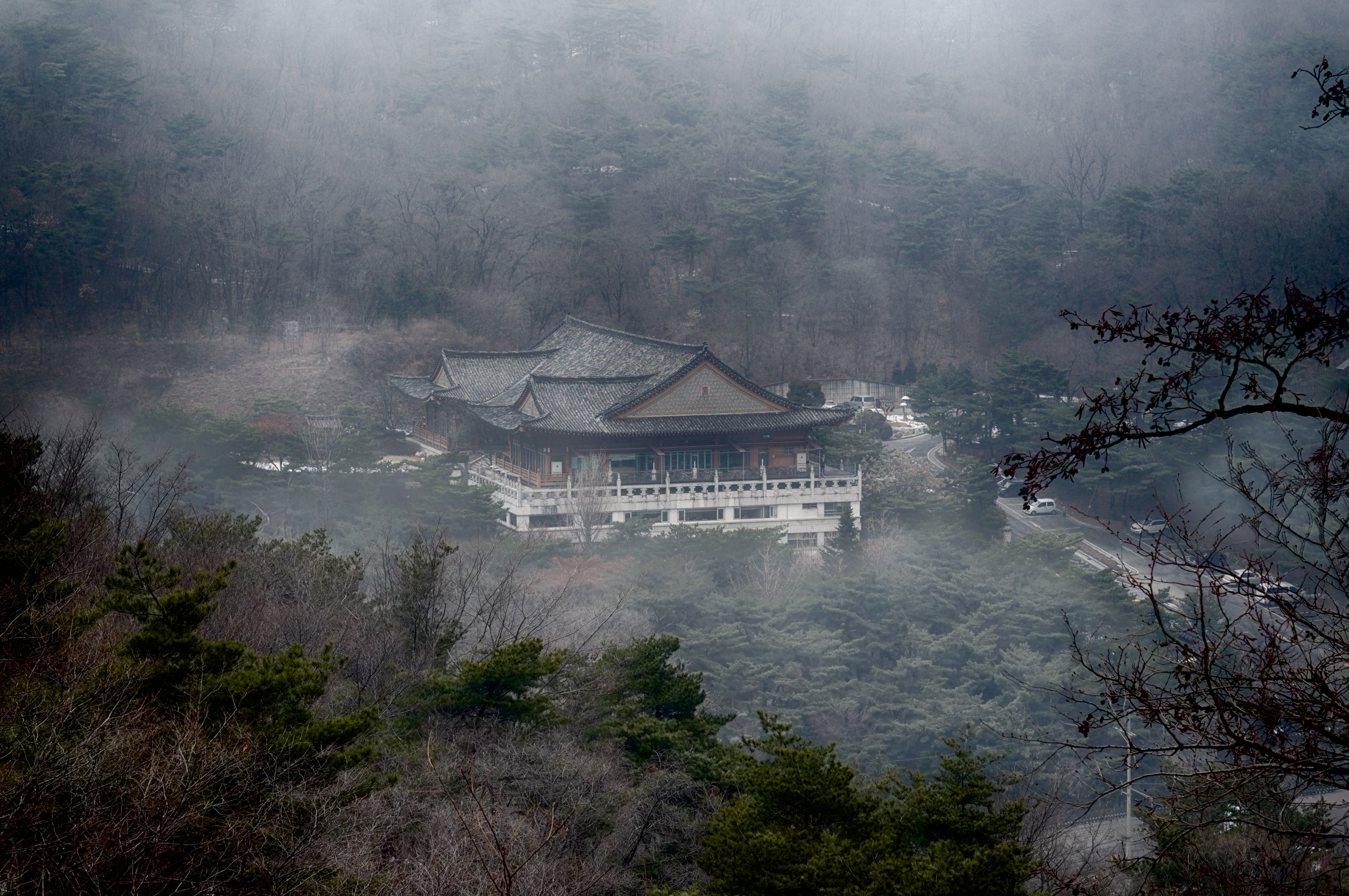
- Samcheonggak (2014)
- Interactive map of Samcheonggak

General information
- Location: 3 Daesagwan-ro, Seongbuk District, Seoul, South Korea
- Coordinates: 37.5972°N 126.9841°E

Korean name
- Hangul: 삼청각
- Hanja: 三淸閣
- RR: Samcheonggak
- MR: Samch'ŏnggak

Samcheonggak (Korean: 삼청각) is a small Korean-style mountainside resort in Seongbuk-dong, Seongbuk District, Seoul. Samcheonggak is near Cheong Wa Dae, the official residence of the President of South Korea, so the surrounding forest remained undeveloped during Korea's miraculous economic growth.

== Name ==
The name "Samcheonggak" comes from Chinese characters meaning "the pavilion of the three purities." The "three purities" (三淸) are pure water (淸水), pure mountains (淸山), and pure humanity (淸人). The name evokes a dwelling place for shinseon, a Taoist hermit with supernatural powers (신선; 神仙).

== History ==
Samcheonggak was first established in 1972 by the authoritarian Park Chung Hee government as a traditional Korean entertainment venue (Kisaeng house) for high-ranking government officials, especially the meeting between the respective Red Cross groups of South and North Korea. After the assassination of Park Chung Hee by Kim Jae-kyu in 1979, Samcheonggak operated as a private restaurant. Samcheonggak was closed due to financial problems in December 1999 and purchased by the Seoul Metropolitan Government in May 2000. The site was opened to the public on October 29, 2001. In August 2005, Samcheonggak was entrusted to Paradise Co., Ltd. The site contains a performance hall, a Korean restaurant, a tea house, and guest accommodations. There are six hanok. Samcheonggak is one of the most famous places in Seoul for traditional performances and fine dining.
