= Korea University station =

Train station in Seoul, South Korea

Coordinates: 37°35′26″N 127°02′11″E

고려대 (종암); Korea Univ. (Jongam)
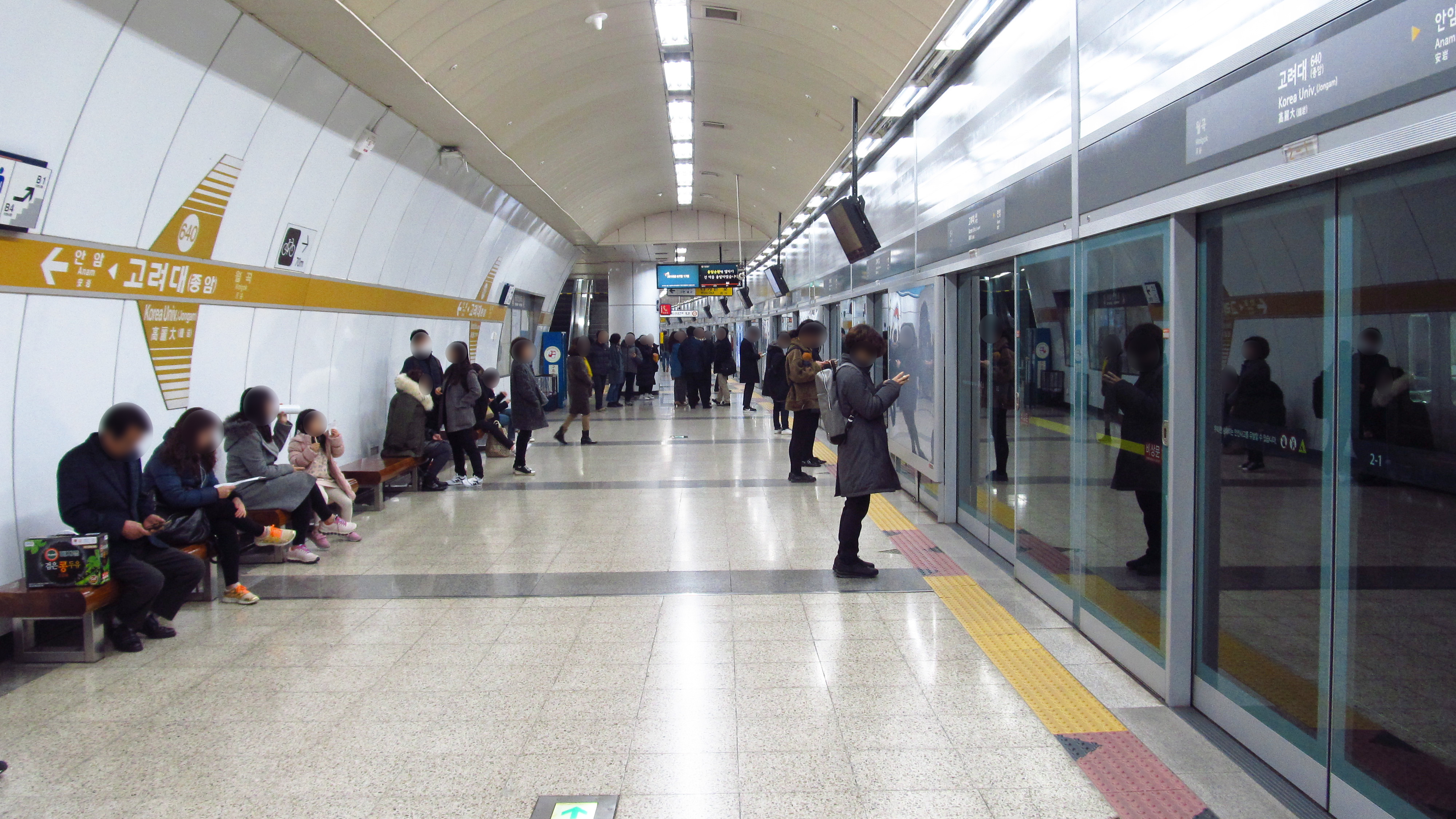

Korean name
- Hangul: 고려대역
- Hanja: 高麗大驛
- Revised Romanization: Goryeodae-yeok
- McCune–Reischauer: Koryŏdae-yŏk

General information
- Location: 1-2 Anam-dong 5-ga, 145 Anamno, Seongbuk-gu, Seoul
- Operated by: Seoul Metro
- Line(s): Line 6
- Platforms: 2
- Tracks: 2

Construction
- Structure type: Underground

Key dates
- December 15, 2000: Line 6 opened

Korea University Station is a subway station on the Seoul Subway Line 6. This station is located in front of the main entrance of Korea University.

City of Seoul has a plan to develop campus town in front of main entrance of Korea University. Furthermore, new commercial districts will be constructed between Korea University Station and Anam Station. This district is expected to be a fresh and active campus town.

== Station layout ==
G	Street level	Exit

L1; Concourse	Lobby	Customer Service, Shops, Vending machines, ATMs

L2; Platform level	Side platform, doors will open on the right
L2; Platform level	Westbound	← Line 6 toward Eungam (Anam)
L2; Platform level	Eastbound	Line 6 toward Sinnae (Wolgok) →
L2; Platform level	Side platform, doors will open on the right

Preceding station	Seoul Metropolitan Subway	Following station
Anam towards Eungam	Line 6	Wolgok towards Sinnae
