= Dongsomun-dong =

- Dongsomun-ro 2-gil, Dongsomun-dong
- Interactive map of Dongsomun-dong
- Coordinates: 37.592°N 127.011°E
- Country: South Korea

Area
  - Total: 0.29 km^{2} (0.11 sq mi)

Population (2001)
  - Total: 12,072
  - Density: 42,000/km^{2} (110,000/sq mi)

Korean name
- Hangul: 동소문동
- Hanja: 東小門洞
- RR: Dongsomun-dong
- MR: Tongsomun-dong

Dongsomun-dong (Korean: 동소문동) is a dong (neighborhood) of Seongbuk District, Seoul, South Korea.
