= Jangwi-dong =

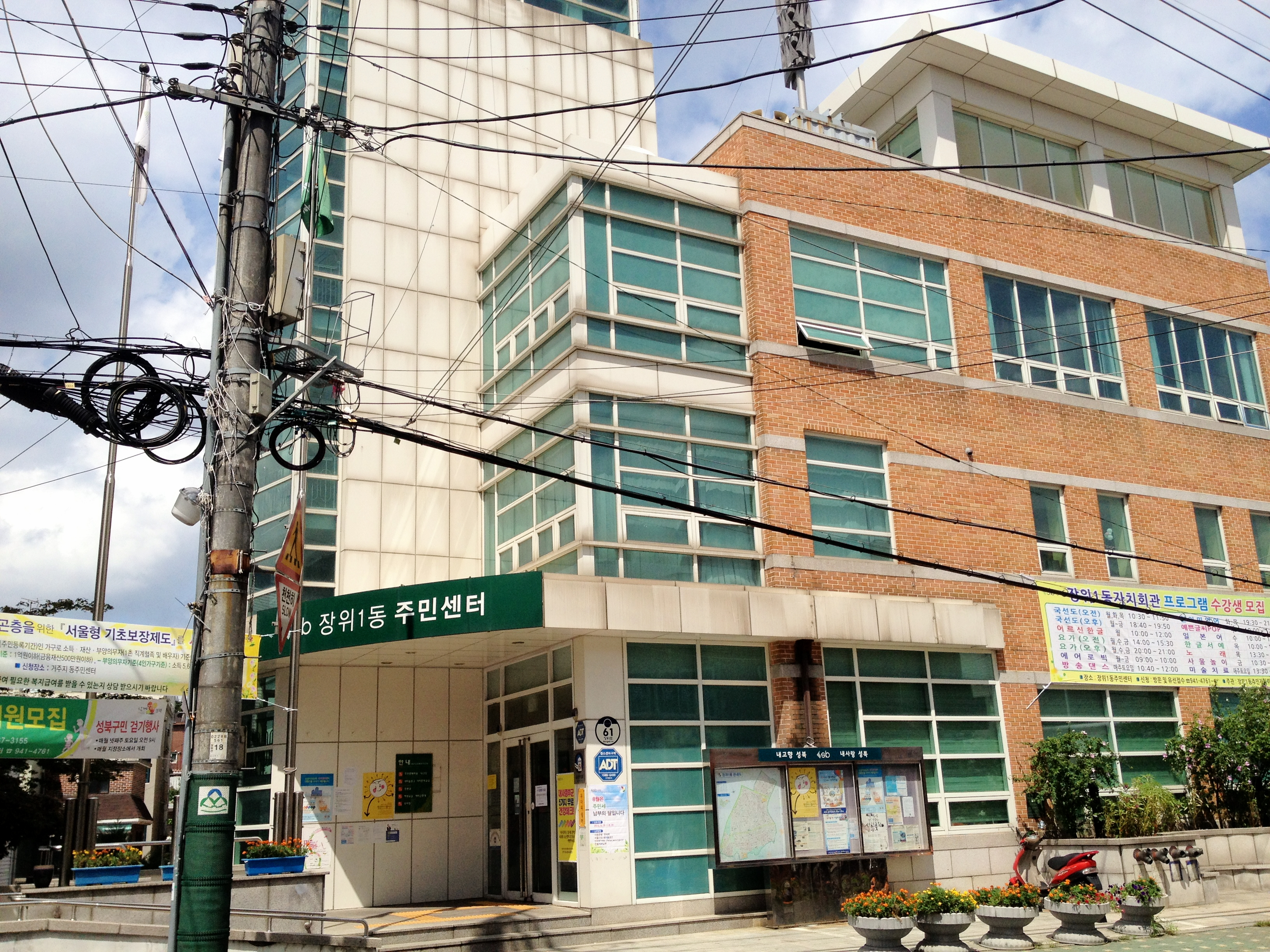
- Country: South Korea

Area
  - Total: 2.10 km^{2} (0.81 sq mi)

Population (2001)
  - Total: 74,467
  - Density: 35,500/km^{2} (91,800/sq mi)

Korean name
- Hangul: 장위동
- Hanja: 長位洞
- RR: Jangwi-dong
- MR: Changwi-dong

Jangwi-dong (Korean: 장위동) is a dong (neighborhood) of Seongbuk District, Seoul, South Korea.

== See also ==
- Administrative divisions of South Korea
