= Gilsangsa =

Buddhist temple in Seoul, South Korea

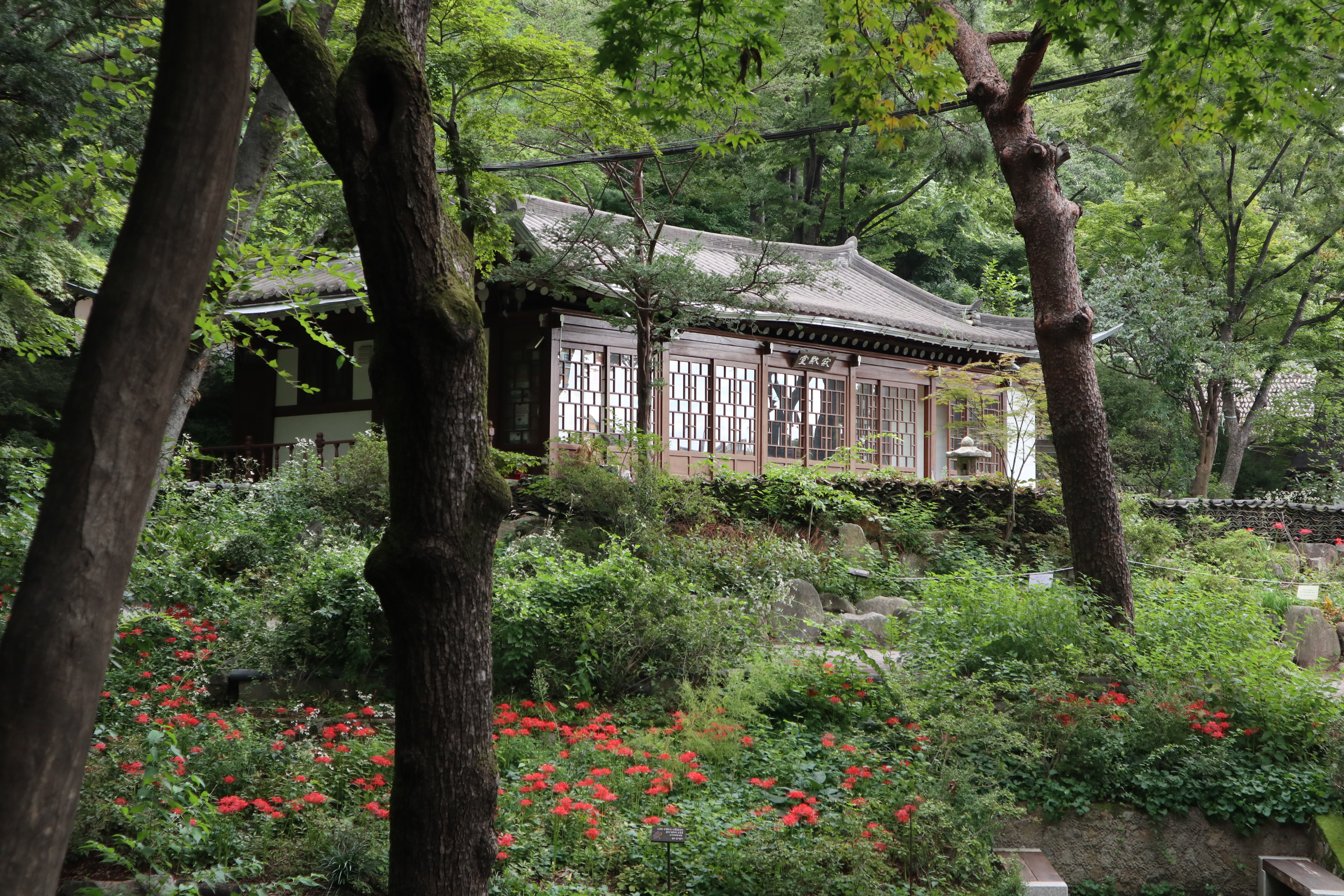
- Part of the temple in 2022

- Location within Seoul Location within South Korea

Religion
- Affiliation: Korean Buddhism

Location
- Location: Seongbuk-dong, Seongbuk District, Seoul, South Korea
- Interactive map of Gilsangsa
- Coordinates: 37.59913°N 126.99427°E

Architecture
- Established: December 14, 1997

Website
- kilsangsa.info/home/default_in.asp (in Korean)

Gilsangsa (Korean: 길상사; Hanja: 吉祥寺) is a Buddhist temple in Seongbuk-dong, Seongbuk District, Seoul, South Korea. The temple is of the Jogye Order of Korean Buddhism. It was established on December 14, 1997, and is located on the Samgaksan mountain.

The temple is relatively new. It was established via a donation of 100 billion won from Kim Yeong-hwa. It has a seven-story stone pagoda. It participates in the Templestay program, where guests can participate in activities at the temple and experience Korean Buddhist culture.

When the Mayor of Seoul Park Won-soon went missing, shortly before his 2020 suicide, his last mobile phone signal was near the temple.

== Gallery ==
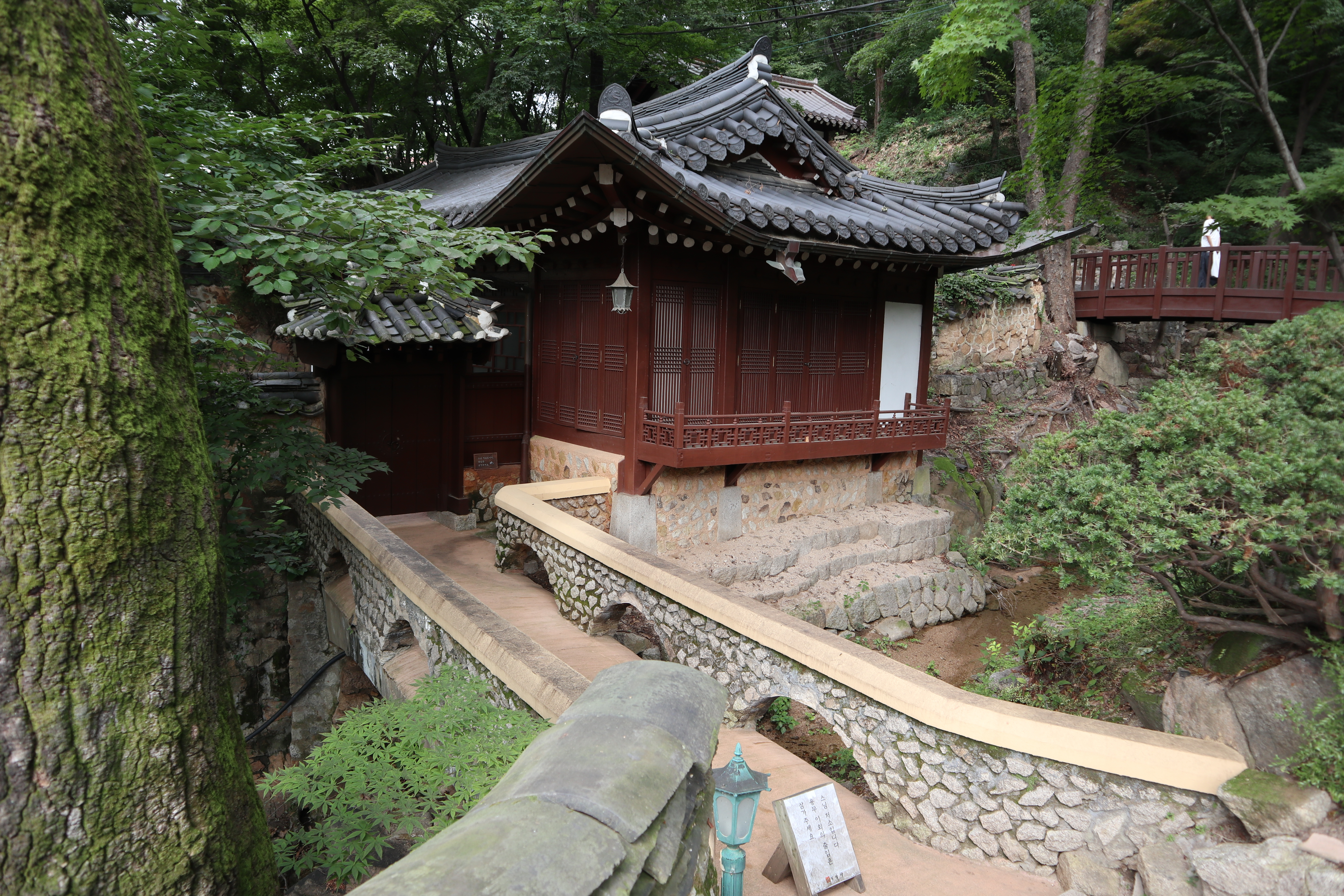
A building of the temple (2022)

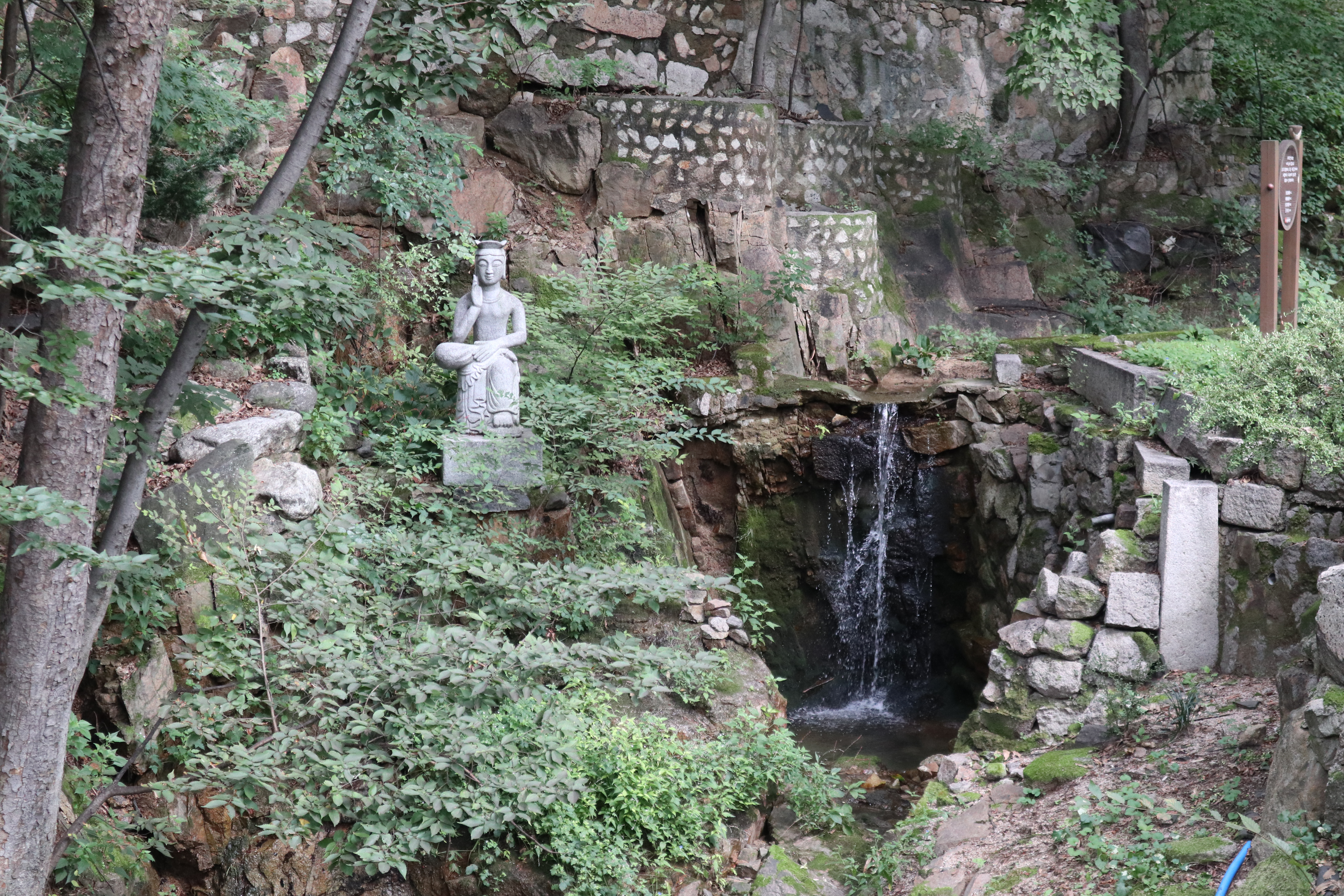
A statue and waterfall in the complex (2022)
