= Seokgwan-dong =

- Interactive map of Seokgwan-dong
- Country: South Korea

Area
  - Total: 1.66 km^{2} (0.64 sq mi)

Population (2001)
  - Total: 45,967
  - Density: 27,700/km^{2} (71,700/sq mi)

Korean name
- Hangul: 석관동
- Hanja: 石串洞
- RR: Seokgwan-dong
- MR: Sŏkkwan-dong

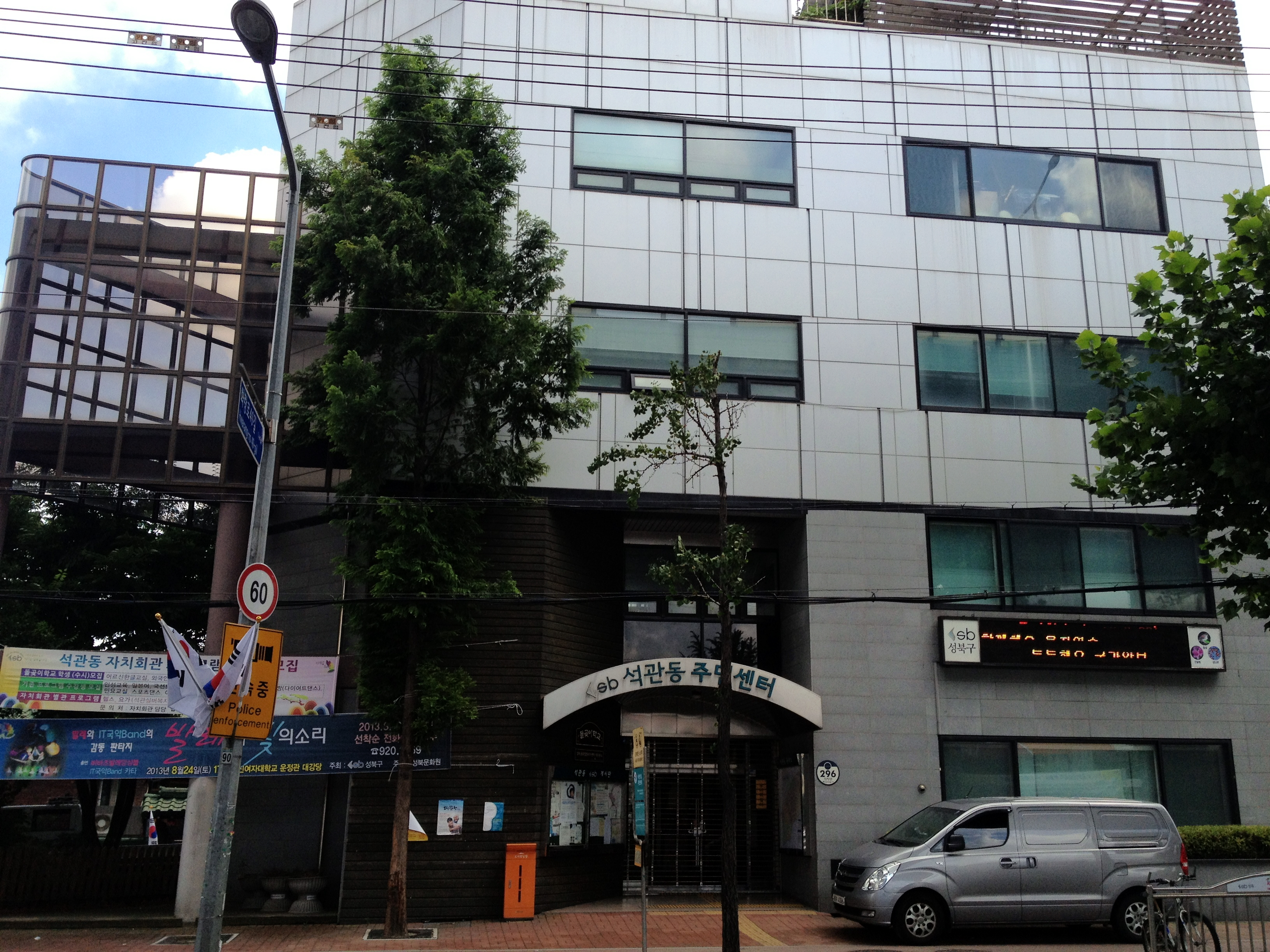
Seokgwan-dong Comunity Service Center(Seongbuk-gu)

Seokgwan-dong (Korean: 석관동) is a dong (neighbourhood) of Seongbuk District, Seoul, South Korea.

== Notable places ==
- Uireung (의릉 懿陵)

== See also ==
- Administrative divisions of South Korea
