= Samseon-dong =

- Interactive map of Samseon-dong
- Country: South Korea

Area
  - Total: 0.84 km^{2} (0.32 sq mi)

Population (2001)
  - Total: 29,176
  - Density: 35,000/km^{2} (90,000/sq mi)

Korean name
- Hangul: 삼선동
- Hanja: 三仙洞
- RR: Samseon-dong
- MR: Samsŏn-dong

Samseon-dong Comunity Service Center(Seongbuk-gu)

Samseon-dong (Korean: 삼선동) is a dong (neighbourhood) of Seongbuk District, Seoul, South Korea.

== See also ==
- Administrative divisions of South Korea
