= Sangwolgok-dong =

- Country: South Korea

Area
  - Total: 0.49 km^{2} (0.19 sq mi)

Population (2001)
  - Total: 7,493
  - Density: 15,000/km^{2} (40,000/sq mi)

Korean name
- Hangul: 상월곡동
- Hanja: 上月谷洞
- RR: Sangwolgok-dong
- MR: Sangwŏlgok-tong

Sangwolgok-dong (Korean: 상월곡동) is a legal dong (neighbourhood) of Seongbuk District, Seoul, South Korea.

== See also ==
- Administrative divisions of South Korea
