= Hawolgok-dong =

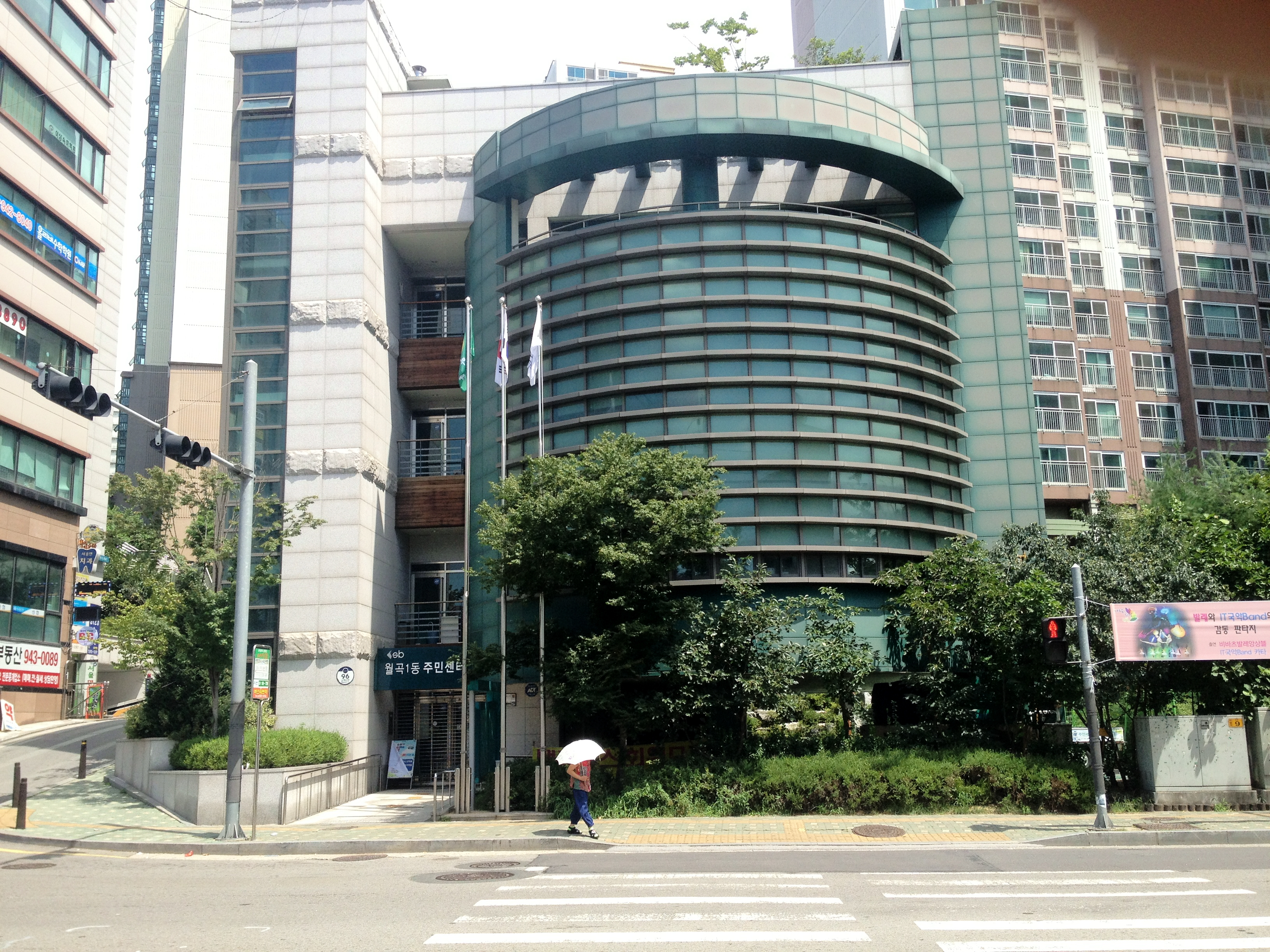
- Wolgok 1-dong Community Service Center (Seongbuk-gu)
- Country: South Korea

Korean name
- Hangul: 하월곡동
- Hanja: 下月谷洞
- RR: Hawolgok-dong
- MR: Hawŏlgok-tong

Hawolgok-dong (Korean: 하월곡동) is a dong (neighborhood) of Seongbuk District, Seoul, South Korea.

== See also ==
- Administrative divisions of South Korea
