= Seongbuk District =

District of Seoul, South Korea

Seongbuk
- Autonomous District
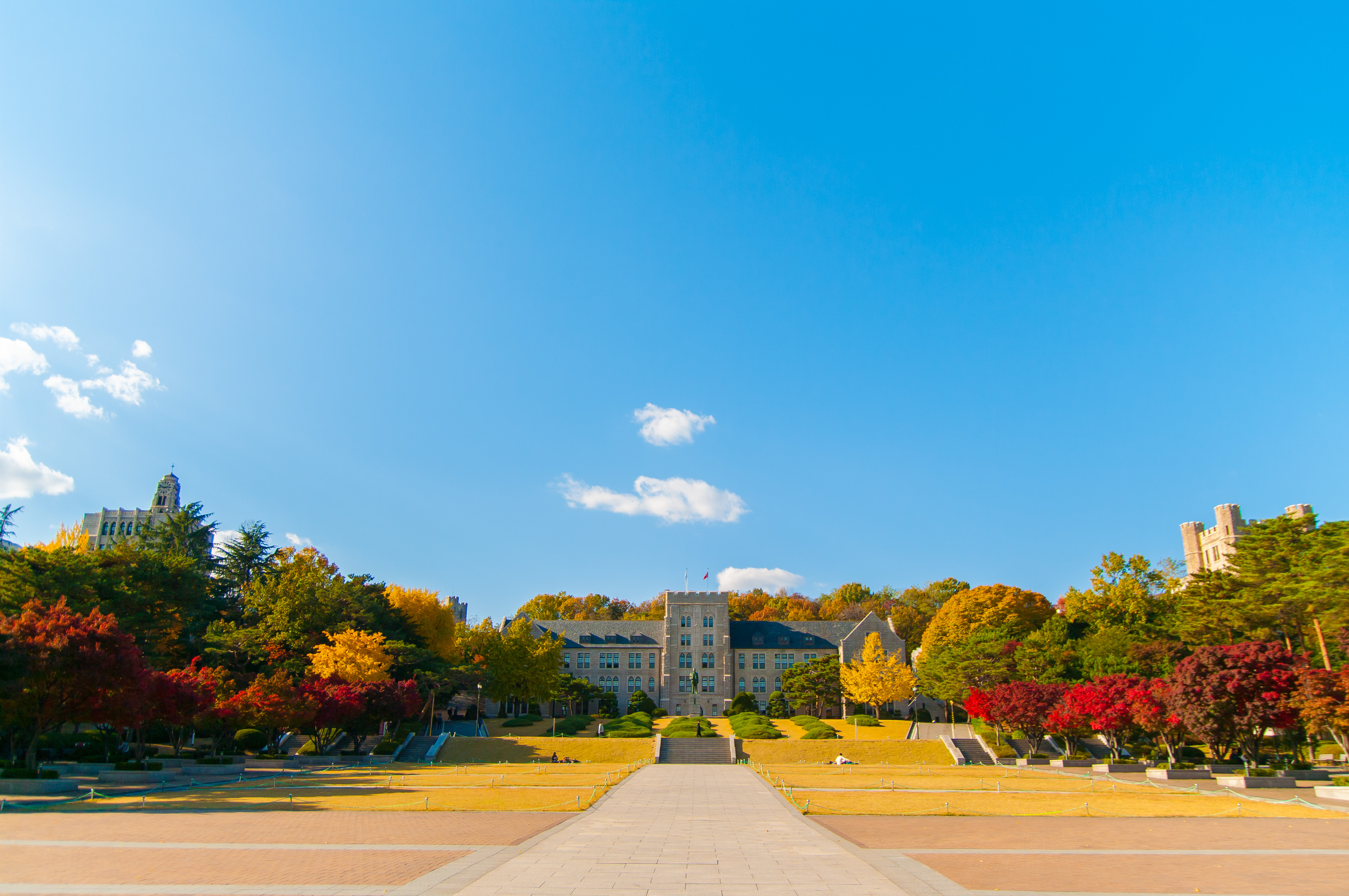
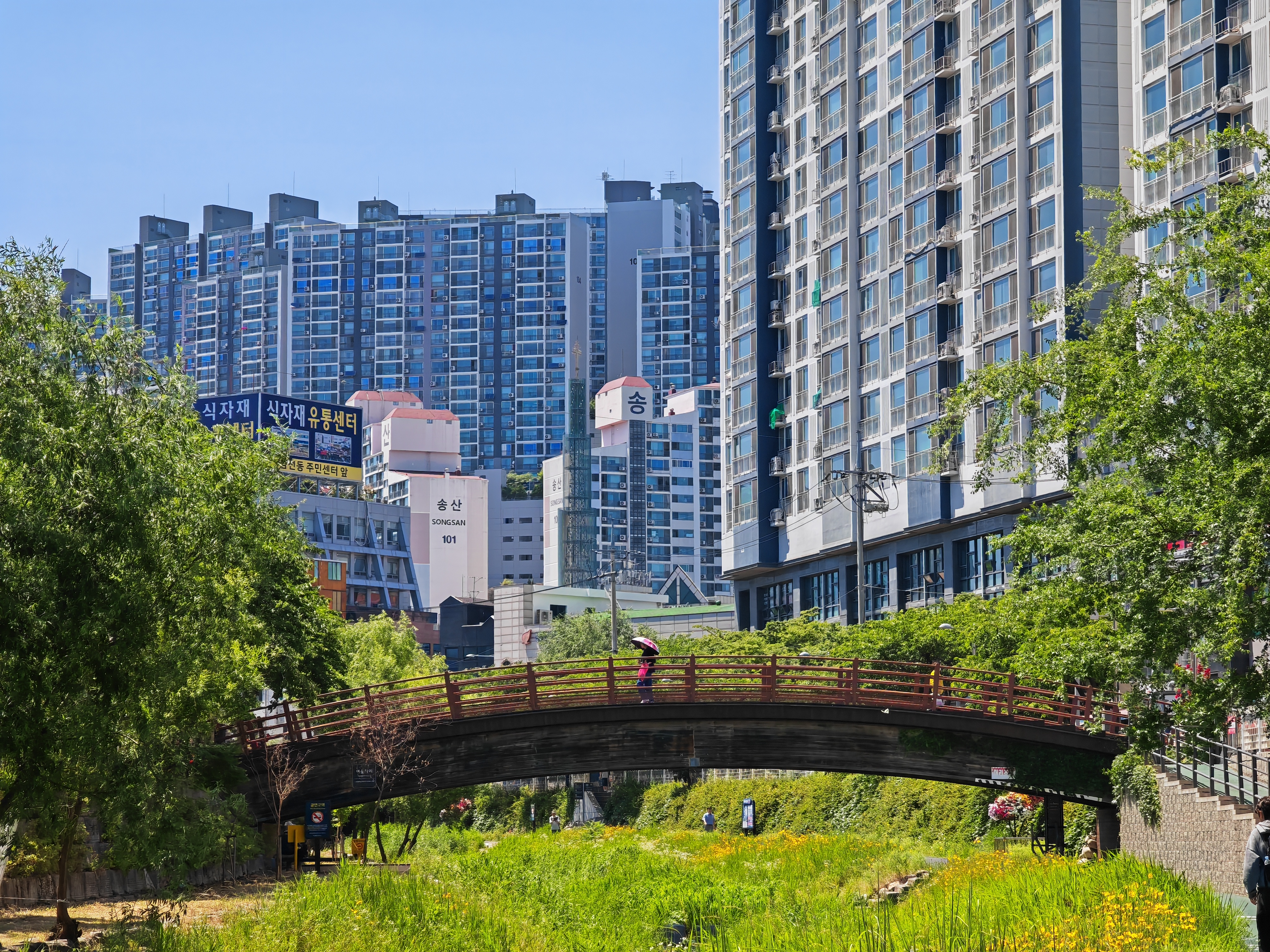
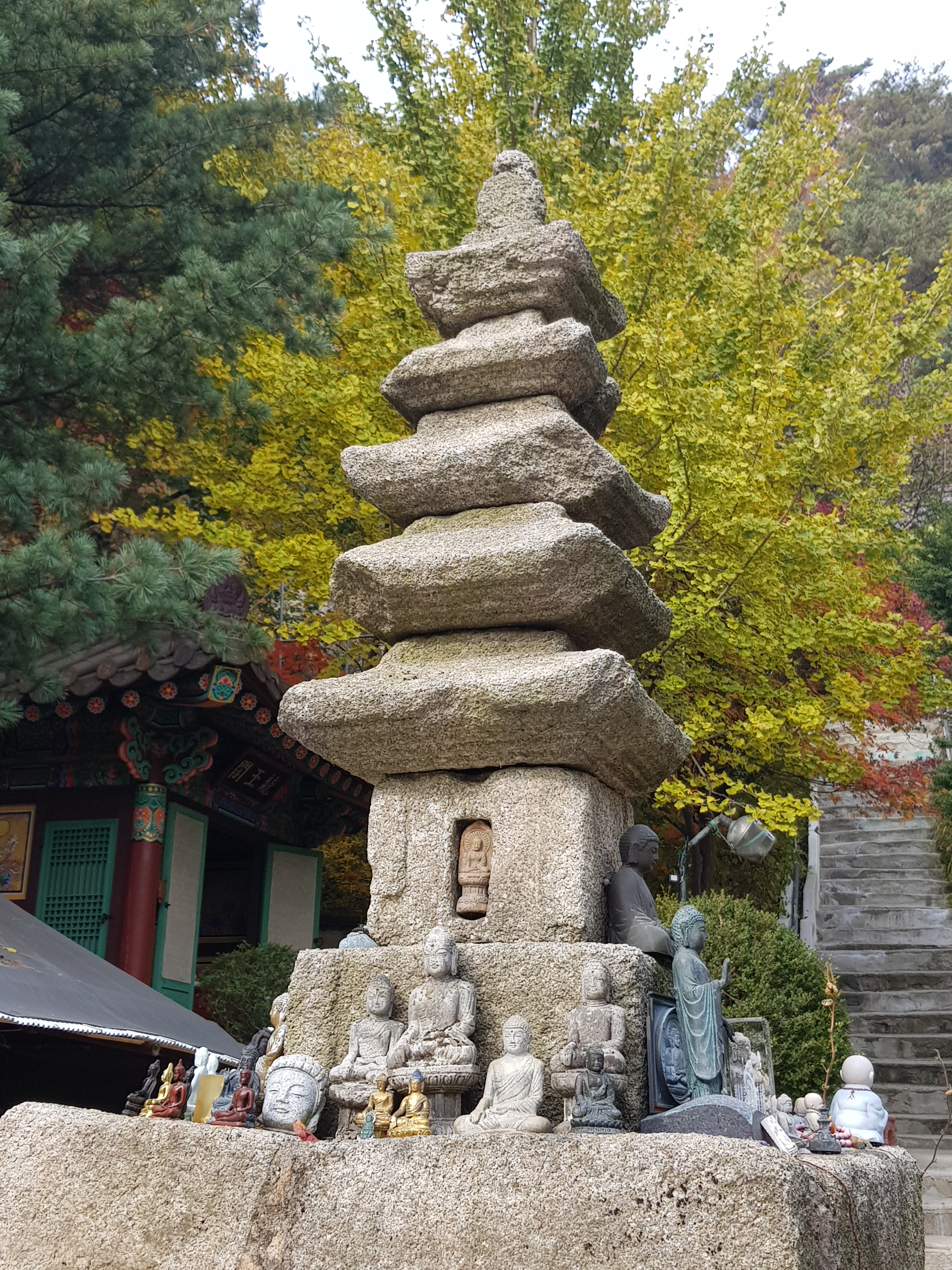
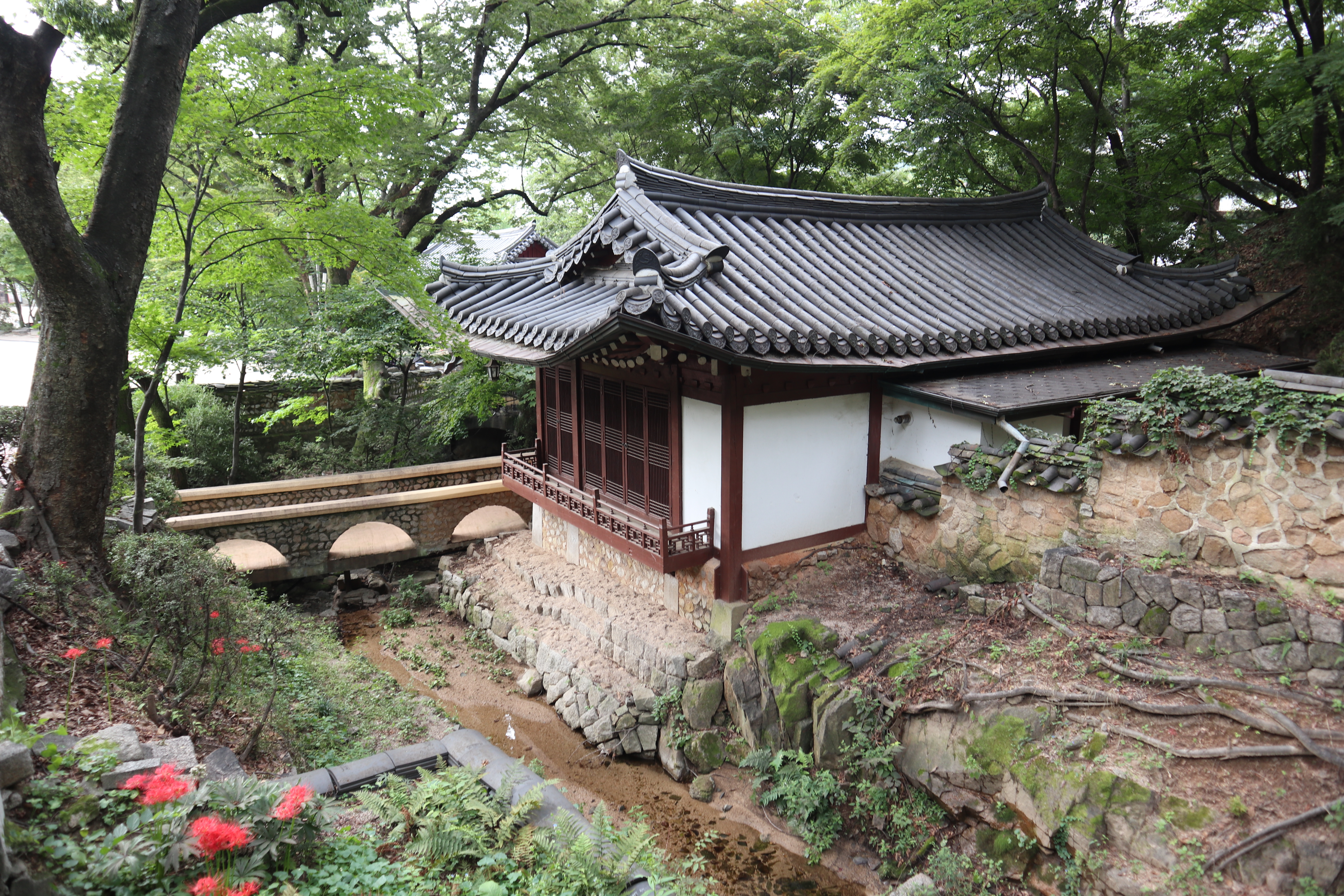
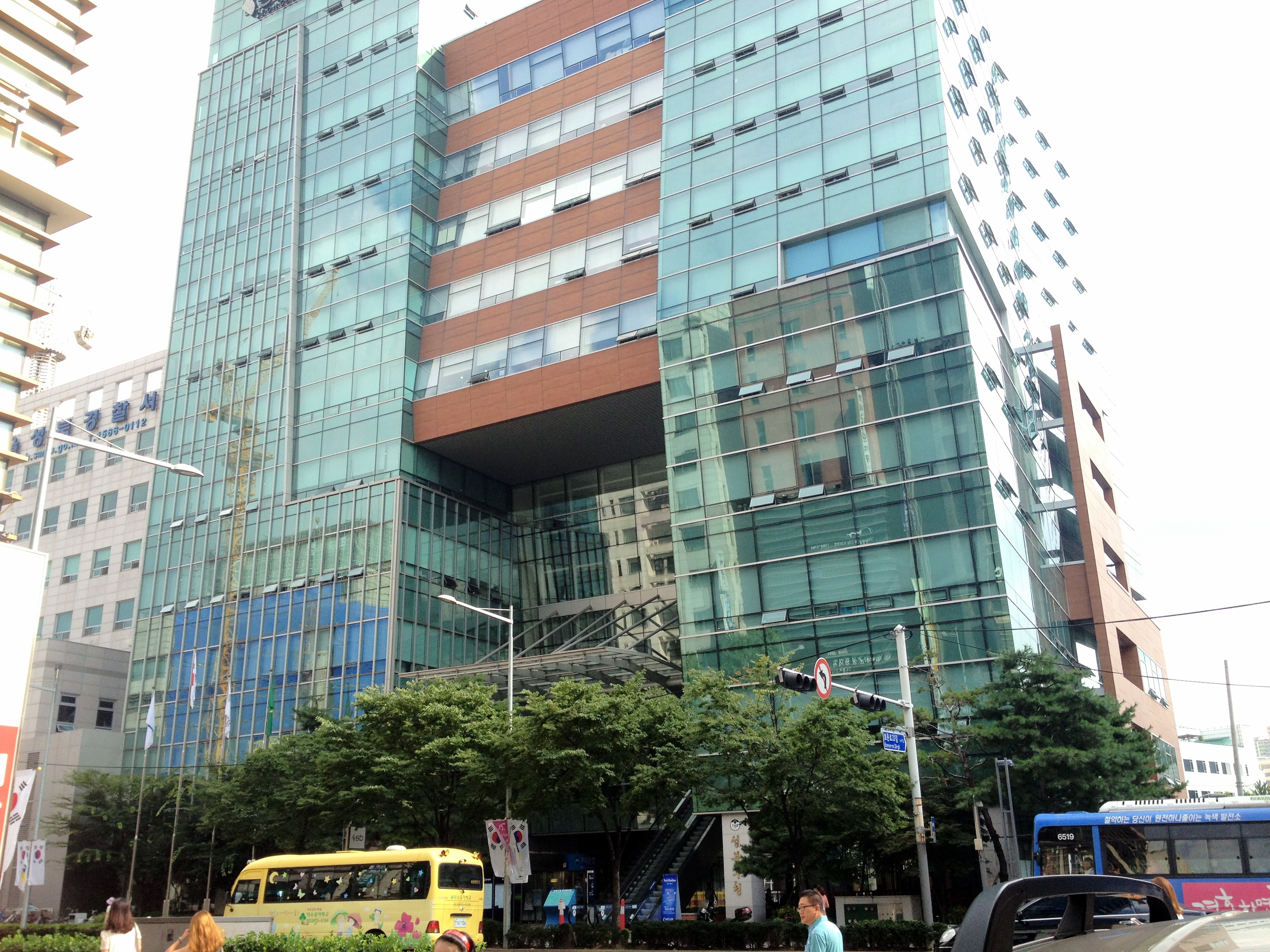
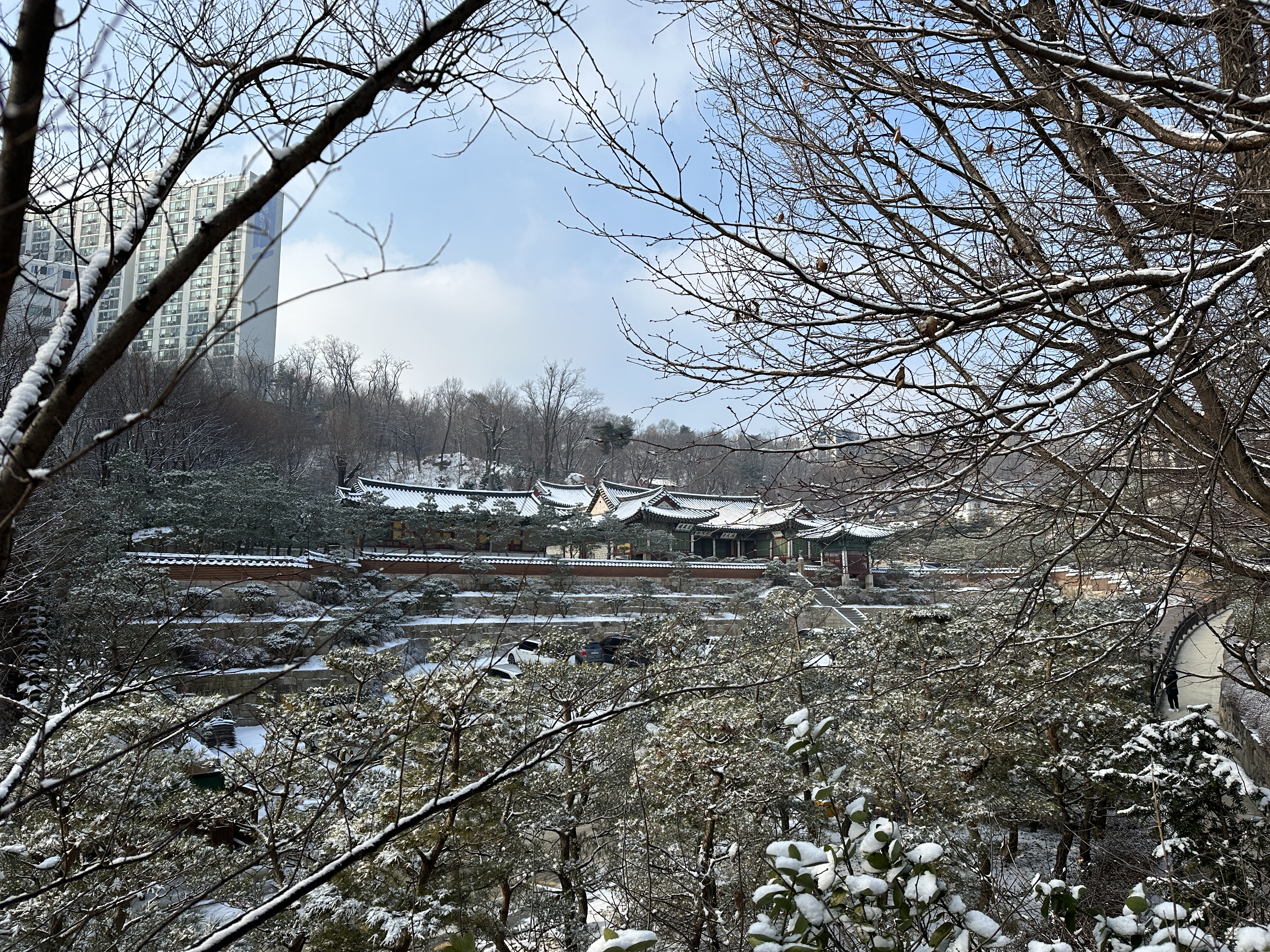
- Korea University Dongsomun-ro Yeongchwisa Gilsangsa Temple Seongbuk-gu Office Heungcheonsa

- Flag

- Location of Seongbuk District in Seoul
- Coordinates: 37°35′21″N 127°01′06″E
- Country: South Korea
- Region: Sudogwon
- Special City: Seoul
- Administrative dong: 30

Government
  - Body: Seongbuk-gu Council
  - Mayor: Lee Seung-ro (Democratic)
  - MNAs: List of MNAs: Kim Young-bae (Democratic); Ki Dong-min (Democratic)

Area
  - Total: 24.57 km^{2} (9.49 sq mi)

Population (June 2025)
  - Total: 424,030
  - Density: 17,260/km^{2} (44,700/sq mi)
- Time zone: UTC+9 (Korea Standard Time)
- Postal code: 02700~02999
- Area code: 02-700,900
- Website: Seongbuk District official website

Korean name
- Hangul: 성북구
- Hanja: 城北區
- RR: Seongbuk-gu
- MR: Sŏngbuk-ku

Seongbuk District (Korean: 성북구) is one of the 25 districts of Seoul, South Korea. The district is located in the mid-north part of the city. The current mayor is Lee Seung-ro, who has been mayor since July 2018. Seongbuk District was established under Presidential Decree No. 159 on August 13, 1949 (including some areas of Dongdaemun District and some areas of Sungin-myeon, Goyang-gun), and was promoted to an autonomous district by implementing a Gu-level local government on May 1, 1988.

== Etymology ==
The name Seongbuk derives from the Korean term meaning "the north of the capital city," which originally referred to the area situated to the north of the city walls of Hanyang, the former name of Seoul. The designation is believed to have originated during the Joseon Dynasty, a period when the region's location relative to the capital's fortifications gave rise to the name. Over time, the geographical reference to the northern part of the capital has endured, and today is used as the official name of Seongbuk District. Although the district's name changed over the years, Seongbuk was officially adopted as the name in 1949.

== History ==
Archaeological excavations have not uncovered any prehistoric artifacts or relics in Seongbuk District. However, the area features a typical baesanimsu geographical structure, with Bukhansan and Bugaksan mountains to the northwest and streams such as Jeongneungcheon and Seongbukcheon flowing from the valleys of these mountains. Given this natural environment, it is presumed that people may have settled and lived in the region. During the Three Kingdoms period, the Goguryeo, Baekje, and Silla dynasties engaged in continuous territorial conflicts over the Han River basin. It is likely that the Seongbuk District area also experienced shifts in ruling powers during this period. After Silla unified the Korean Peninsula, the region, including present-day Seoul, was incorporated into Hansanju, one of the administrative districts of Silla. During the reign of King Gyeongdeok, Hansanju was renamed Hanju, and the area was designated as Hanyang-gun, placing Seongbuk District under Hanju's jurisdiction. In 1967, in Samyang-dong, an area adjacent to Seongbuk District and now part of Gangbuk District, the Gilt-bronze Standing Avalokitesvara Bodhisattva of Samyang-dong, Seoul (National Treasure No. 127) was discovered. The statue is believed to date back to the early 7th century, and is attributed to Silla.

Following the establishment of Goryeo by Taejo of Goryeo in 918, the area encompassing present-day Seongbuk District was referred to as Yangju until the reign of King Jeongjong (r. 1035–1046). From the reign of King Munjong (r. 1046–1083) until the reign of King Chungnyeol (r. 1275–1308), the region was designated as Namgyeong. After King Chungseon (r. 1308–1313), and throughout the late Goryeo period, it was referred to as Hanyang-bu. A major transportation route connecting the Goryeo capital, Gaegyeong, with Namgyeong (modern-day Seoul) passed through Seongbuk District. The route is believed to have followed the modern-day road connecting Miasageori, Korea University, Sinseol-dong, and Dongdaemun. Several Buddhist relics and temples from the Goryeo period remain along the route, including the Rock-carved Seated Buddha of Botasa Temple, Bomunsa Temple, and Mita Temple. as well as the Gyeongguksa Temple, established in the late Goryeo period, located in Jeongneung-dong.

During the Joseon Dynasty, the Seongbuk District area was part of the Seongjeo Ship-ri, located outside the city walls of Hanseong (modern-day Seoul). In the late Joseon period, the region fell under the jurisdiction of Sungsin-bang and Inchang-bang. The name "Seongbuk" reflects the meaning "the north of the capital city," referring to the area located to the north of the city walls of Hanyang (modern-day Seoul). This name has persisted into modern times. In the 1840 map of Hanyang, Suseon Jeondo, the term "Seongbuk-dong" appears, marking the area. The southern foothills of Bukhansan, which are now part of Seongbuk District, were heavily forested, so much so that wild tigers once roamed the area, prompting the king to lead hunting expeditions to the region. During the Joseon Dynasty, the area now known as Seongbuk was a significant gateway to the northeast of Seoul. The main route connecting Seoul to Gangwon-do and ultimately to Hamgyeong-do passed through the region. This road served as an important trade route, linking merchants and facilitating the exchange of goods, such as daily necessities from Hanyang and various marine products from Hamgyeong-do.

In the late Joseon period, the military unit Eoyeongcheong established a northern garrison (Bukdun) in Seongbuk-dong to protect the city. Soldiers and civilians were tasked with cultivating the land, although the area's poor soil and limited arable land posed challenges. To sustain the population and support the military, the government established systems like the Pobaek and Hunjo industries. These involved the production of unbleached hemp and raw cloth, as well as the preparation of fermented soybeans to supply the royal court.

Seongbuk, which had been located outside the city walls until the Joseon Dynasty, became part of Gyeongseong (now Seoul) in 1936. In the early Japanese colonial era, Seongbuk originally was in Goyang County but later fell under incorporation by Gyeongseong. Between 1914 and 1929, when Seongbuk was not yet part of Gyeongseong, a communal cemetery was established in the area. Due to poor transportation, the inhabitants ended up burying the dead in places relatively close to cities. In addition, traditional funeral practices, like the decoration of the funeral procession and accompanying the corpse to the cemetery, determined where the cemetery was to be located. The Mia-ri communal cemetery, established during this time, was demolished in the mid-1950s, and the area became home to displaced individuals and the poor. The Japanese colonial administration in 1937 began implementing land-redistribution programs in the Donam district, leading to an increase in the district's population. Although the Japanese government finished the reorganization of the land, it was concerned that the suburbs would remain underdeveloped since there was no interest in settlement. To fight this, the government conducted wide-ranging propaganda efforts promoting the idea that living in the suburbs would improve one's living standards, whereas urban life would lead to poverty. This resulted in the construction of what became known as "Joseon-style houses" or urban hanok, which was a blend of traditional Korean architecture and Western-style housing.

As the Donam district expanded into a residential area, the majority of the early residents, who were often poorer families, were relegated to the fringes of the district, namely in the areas around Jeongneung-ri and the Jeongneungcheon stream. Displaced families established temporary settlements referred to as "Tommok-chon" (shantytowns), in which disaster victims built simple houses along riverbanks, embankments, and underneath bridges. With more and more displaced people moving there, the government of Japan formally declared Jeongneung-ri a place for resettling them. It was subsequently leveled in around 1942 when the Japanese army, suffering labor shortages in the middle of World War II, relocated these people to Hokkaido and elsewhere by force. When more people moved to Seongbuk, educational institutions began opening in the area. In the mid-1930s, several schools including Boseong College, which would go on to become Korea University, Gyeongseong Commercial High School, and a few Japanese residents' schools were built. The schools played an important role in the educational history of the district and in establishing the presence of different universities in the area of Seongbuk today. Public transportation such as buses and trams began operating n the district. In 1941, a tram station had been established in Donam-dong near Mia-ri and the city gate to the east.

Seongbuk District officially adopted its current name in 1949, following the end of Japanese colonial rule and the liberation of Korea. At that time, several neighborhoods from different districts were merged to form Seongbuk, including Donam-dong and Anam-dong from Dongdaemun District, Seongbuk-dong from Jongno District, and various areas that were previously part of Gyeonggi Province, such as Seokgwan-ri, Jangwi-ri, Uiwang-ri, Suyu-ri, Sangwolgok-ri, Hahwolgok-ri, Mia-ri, and Jeongneung-ri. As the population continued to grow, several administrative changes occurred. In 1973, some neighborhoods north of Mia-ri and Mia-ri itself were transferred to Dobong District. In 1975, portions of Seokgwan-dong, Jongam-dong, and Anam-dong were incorporated into Dongdaemun District, while parts of Jeongneung-dong and Hawolgok-dong were assigned to Dobong District. Conversely, the neighborhood of Bomun-dong, previously part of Dongdaemun District, was reallocated to Seongbuk In the post-Korean War period, Seongbuk District underwent immense change, particularly in its population. The population of Seongbuk grew at a very high level compared to the rest of Seoul from 1953 through to the early 1970s. As the population grew, the demand for housing increased. Many neighborhoods in Seongbuk, such as those with names derived from the Chinese character '암' (meaning 'rock' or 'stone'), required significant land reclamation to build residential areas. During the post-colonial era, many of the urban-style hanok (traditional Korean houses) built during the Japanese occupation were demolished to make way for modern brick apartment buildings.

== Administrative divisions ==
Administrative divisions

Seongbuk District consists of 20 administrative dongs (haengjeong-dong, 행정동) and 39 legal dongs (beopjeong-dong, 법정동).

- Anam-dong (안암동 安岩洞)
- Bomun-dong (보문동 普門洞)
- Donam-dong (돈암동 敦岩洞) 1~2
- Dongseon-dong (동선동 東仙洞) 1~2
- Dongsomun-dong (동소문동 東小門洞)
- Gireum-dong (길음동 吉音洞) 1~3
- Jangwi-dong (장위동 長位洞) 1~3
- Jeongneung-dong (정릉동 貞陵洞) 1~4
- Jongam-dong (종암동 鍾岩洞) 1~2
- Samseon-dong (삼선동 三仙洞) 1~2
- Sangwolgok-dong (상월곡동 上月谷洞)
- Seokgwan-dong (석관동 石串洞) 1~2
- Seongbuk-dong (성북동 城北洞) 1~2
- Wolgok-dong (월곡동 月谷洞) 1~4동
  - Hawolgok-dong (하월곡동 下月谷洞), beopjeong-dong administered by the haengjeong-dong offices of Wolgok 1 ~2 dong

== Education ==
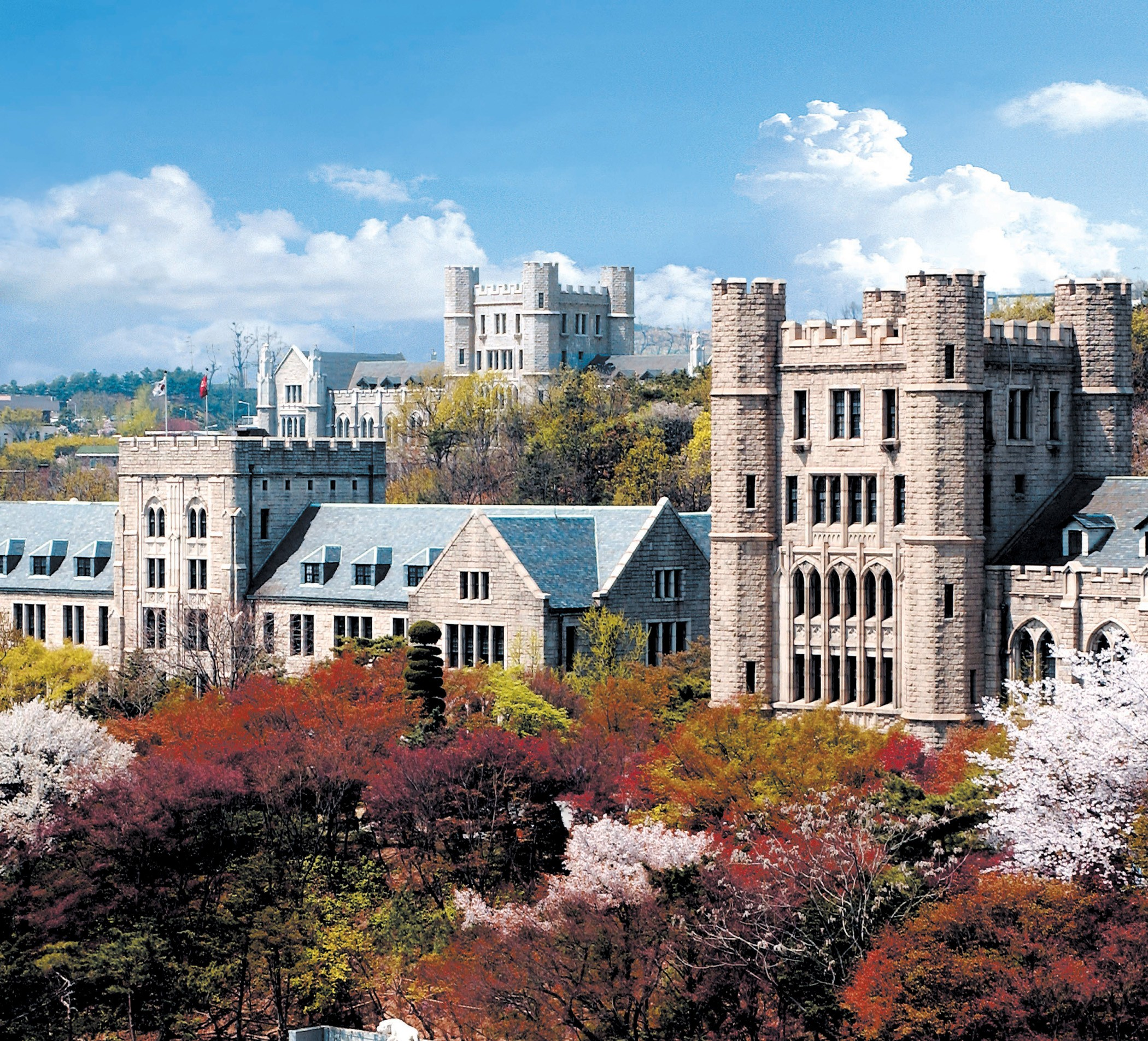
Seoul campus of Korea University is located at Anam-ro in Seongbuk-gu

Seongbuk-gu is known for housing several prestigious universities. It accommodates Korea University, which is among South Korea's SKY top three, with a brilliant reputation for scholarship, particularly in fields such as law, business, and international studies. The district also hosts Kookmin University, which is well-regarded for its programs in design, engineering, and business, Hansung University, acknowledged as a pioneer in academic-industry collaboration, as well as Sungshin Women's University, a leading institution specializing in liberal arts, education, and fashion studies. Seongbuk and nearby Seongdong-gu also host Hanyang University, another top school with highly respected engineering and business courses. The presence of such universities has changed Seongbuk into an active student quarter, with abundant libraries, coffee shops, and cultural centers accommodating academic life.

== Attractions ==
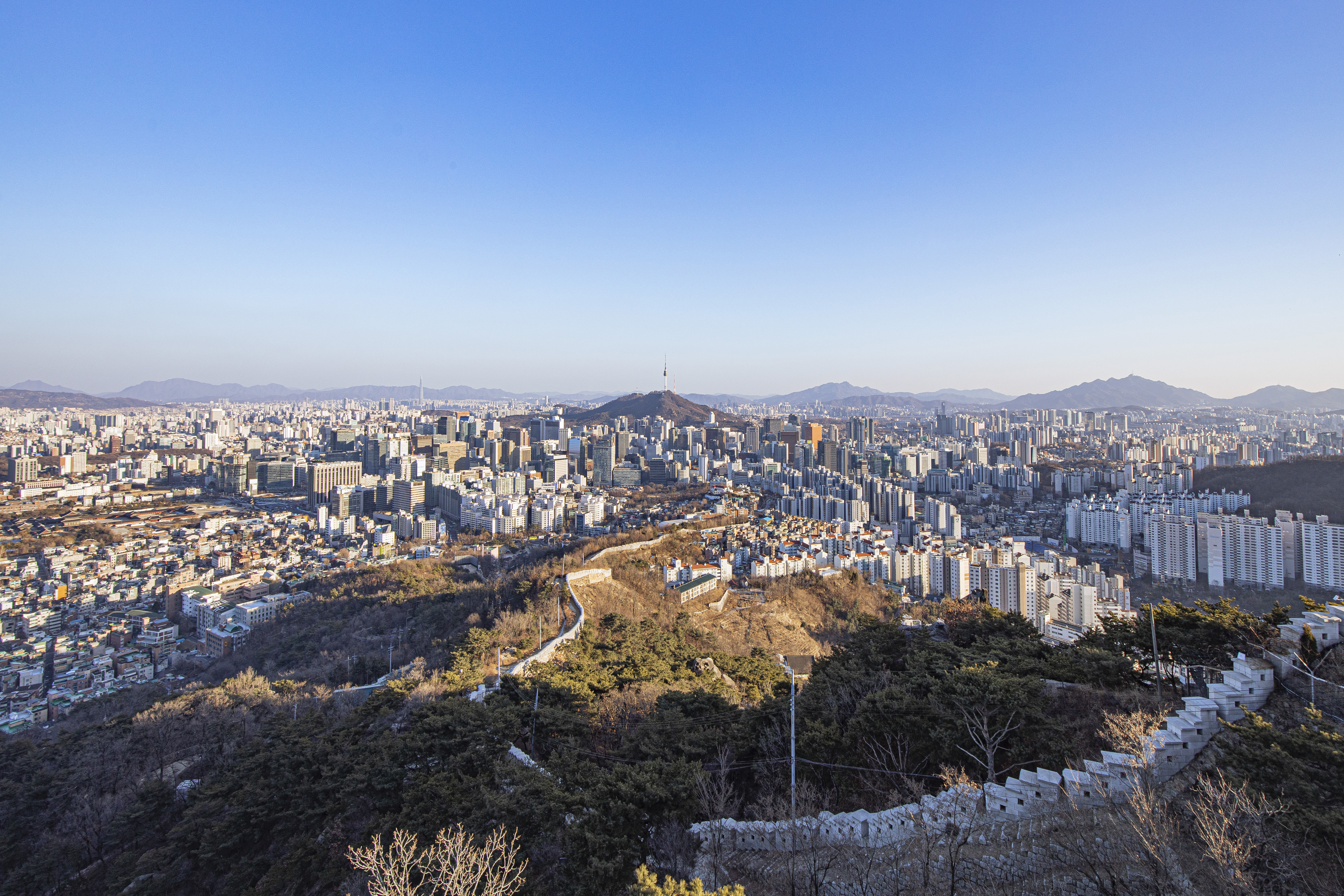
Seoul City Wall, with Downtown Seoul seen in the distance

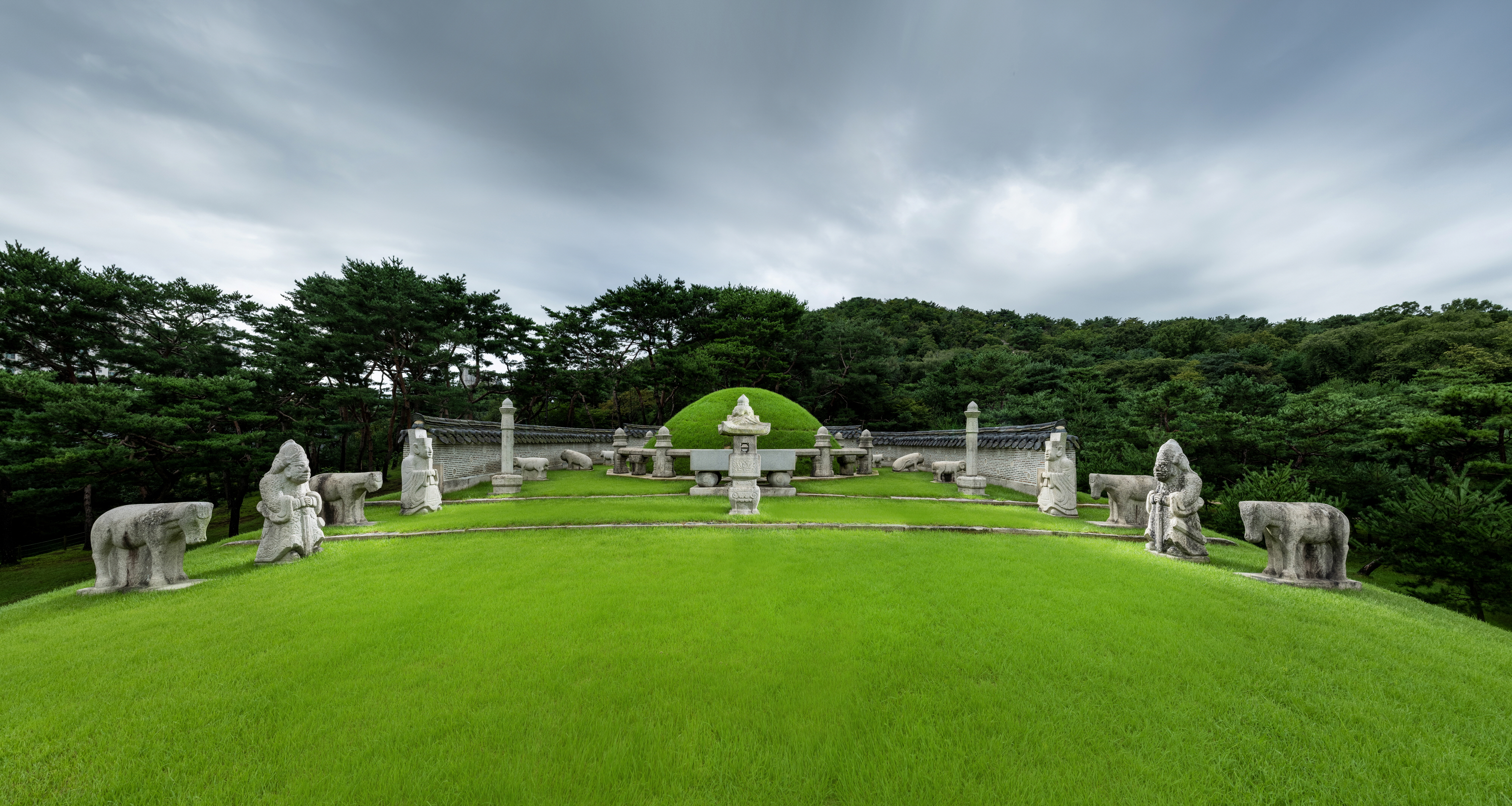
Uireung is one of the Royal Tombs of the Joseon Dynasty

Seongbuk-gu is home to several historical and cultural landmarks that highlight Seoul's rich heritage. Uireung and Jeongneung are royal tombs from the Joseon Dynasty, both part of the UNESCO-listed Royal Tombs of the Joseon Dynasty. Uireung is the burial site of King Gyeongjong, the 20th King of Joseon, as well as his queen consort, Queen Seonui, while Jeongneung houses the tomb of Queen Sindeok, the second wife of King Taejo, who founded the Joseon Dynasty. The district is also notable for its connections to Seoul's ancient fortifications. Hanyangdoseong, or the Seoul City Wall, runs through Seongbuk and includes two of its historic gates, Sukjeongmun and Hyehwamun. Sukjeongmun, also known as the North Gate, was one of the four main gates of the city wall and played a strategic role in protecting the northern entrance to Seoul. Hyehwamun, originally called Honghwamun, served as one of the four auxiliary gates and remains a well-preserved historical site.

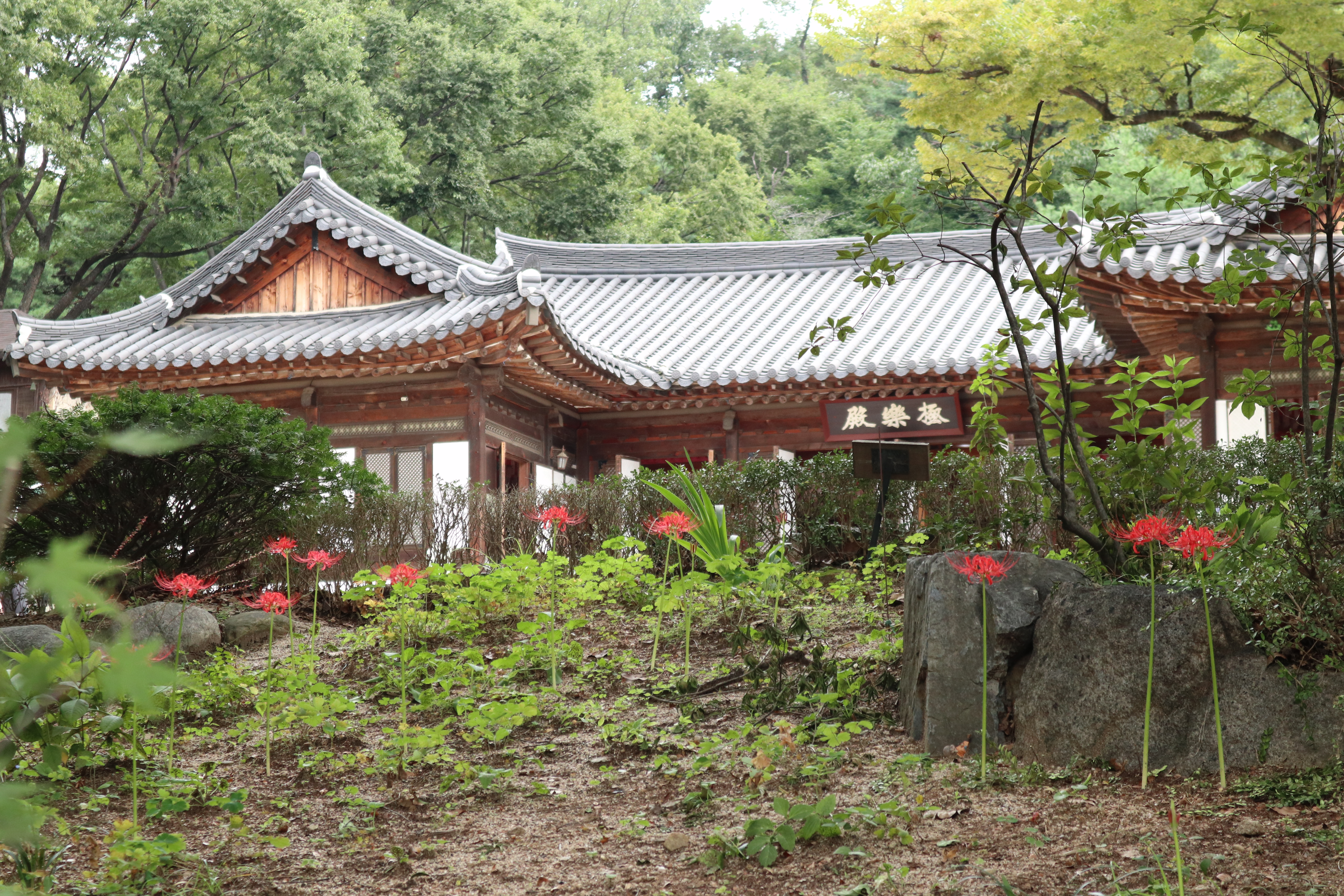
Gilsangsa Temple, established in 1997

Seongbuk is known for its cultural and literary heritage. The Manhae Han Yong-un Simujang Residence was the home of Han Yong-un, a prominent independence activist, Buddhist reformer, and poet. Han was among the 33 national representatives who led the March First Movement in 1919, a turning point in Korea's struggle against Japanese colonial rule. He is also famous for his poem collection Silence of Love (Nim-ui Chimmuk). Han lived here from 1933 until his death in 1944, during which time he continued his political and literary activities. The Lee Tae-jun Residence and the Choi Sun-u Residence in Seongbuk-dong, former homes of prominent literary and artistic figures, are also significant. The Choi Sun-u Residence, in particular, was the home of Choi Sunu, a scholar and former director of the National Museum of Korea. The district is also home to Gilsangsa Temple, and the Korea Furniture Museum, which displays approximately 550 pieces of wooden furniture. Gilsangsa is a unique Buddhist temple with a modern history. Originally a high-end restaurant, the site was later donated and converted into a temple, which now serves as a place for meditation, spiritual study, and cultural programs. Seongbuk also features Samcheonggak, a traditional Korean cultural complex established in 1972, known for its beautiful architecture and serene surroundings.

== Transportation ==
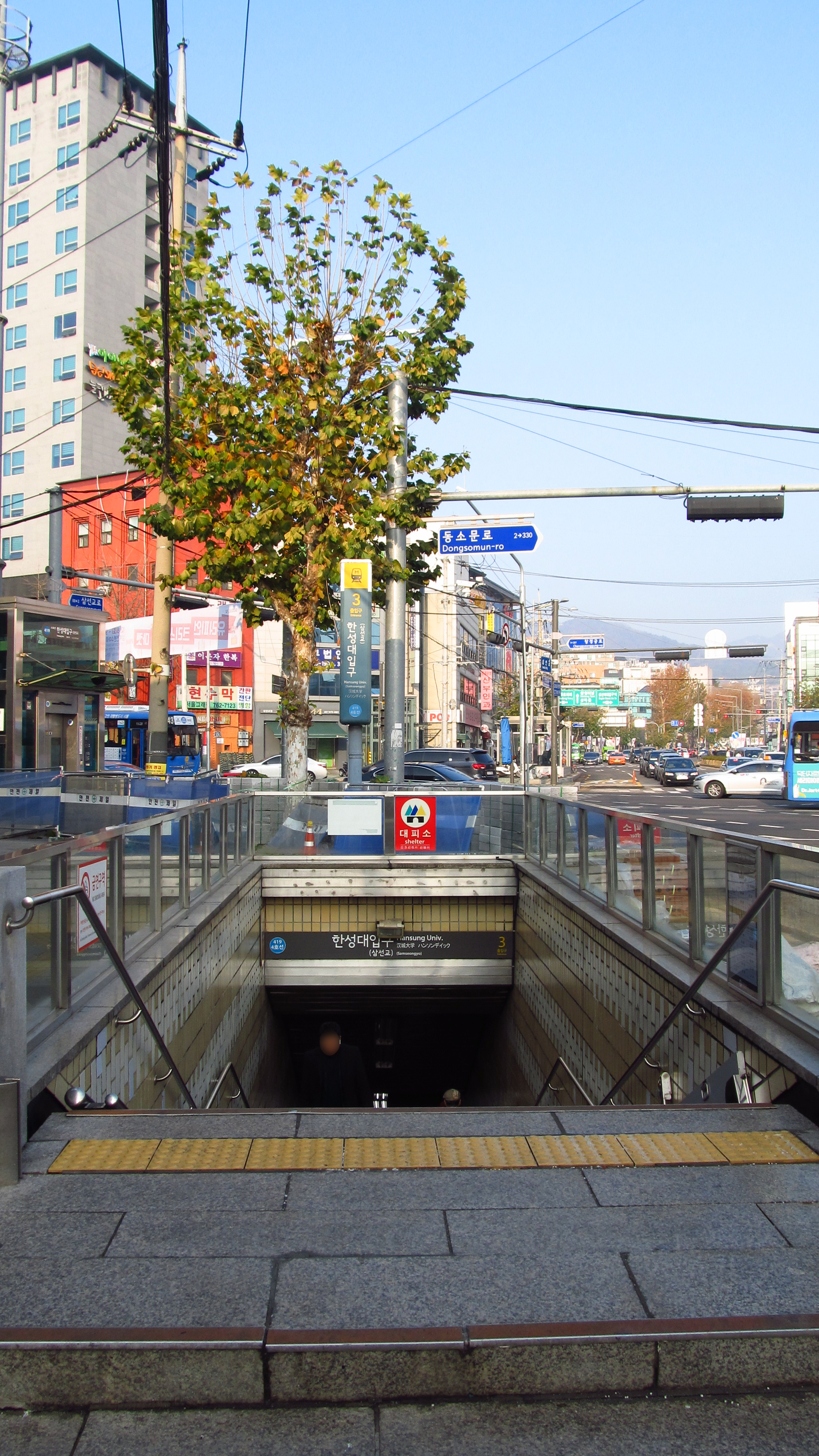
Entrance 3 of Hansung University station

=== Railroad ===
==== Seoul Subway Line 4 (Seoul Metro) ====
Seoul Subway Line 4 passes through areas such as Gireum, Sungshin Women's University, and Hansung University, connecting Seongbuk and Jongno Districts.

(Gangbuk-gu) ← Gireum — Sungshin Women's University — Hansung University → (Jongno-gu)

==== Seoul Subway Line 6 (SMRT) ====
Seoul Subway Line 6 runs through Jongno and Nowon Districts, with key stations including Bomun, Anam, Korea University, Wolgok, Sangwolgok, and Dolgoji. The line links the eastern and northern parts of the city.

(Jongno-gu) ← Bomun — Anam — Korea University — Wolgok — Sangwolgok — Dolgoji → (Nowon-gu)

==== Ui LRT ====
The Ui LRT, a light rail transit system, passes through Bukhansan Bogungmun, also known as Seokyeong University, Jeongneung, Sungshin Women's University, and Bomun, connecting the district to Gangbuk and Dongdaemun.

(Gangbuk-gu) ← Bukhansan Bogungmun — Jeongneung — Sungshin Women's University — Bomun → (Dongdaemun-gu)

== Sister cities ==
- Shunyi, China
- Buena Park, CA, United States

== Notable people ==
- Um Ki-joon (엄기준), South Korean actor
- Bumkey (Real Name: Kwon Ki-bum, 권기범), South Korean R&B singer-songwriter (born in Seongbuk District)
- Wendy (Real Name: Shon Seung-wan or Son Seung-wan, 손승완), singer, dancer, model, MC and K-pop idol, member of K-pop girlgroup Red Velvet (born in Seongbuk District)
- Lee Jin-hyuk, singer, rapper and actor, member of Up10tion (born in Seongbuk District)
- Yoon Suk-yeol, 13th President of South Korea (born in Seongbuk District)
- Hwang Yun-seong, singer, dancer, idol and member of Drippin (born in Seongbuk District)
- Sim Jae-Yun (known as Jake), singer, rapper, dancer, songwriter, a member of ENHYPEN (born in Seongbuk District)
- Yeonjun (Real Name: Choi Yeon-jun, 최연준), rapper, singer-songwriter, dancer, Ambassador, MC and member of TXT (born in Seongbuk District, Seoul, South Korea)
