= Bomun-dong =

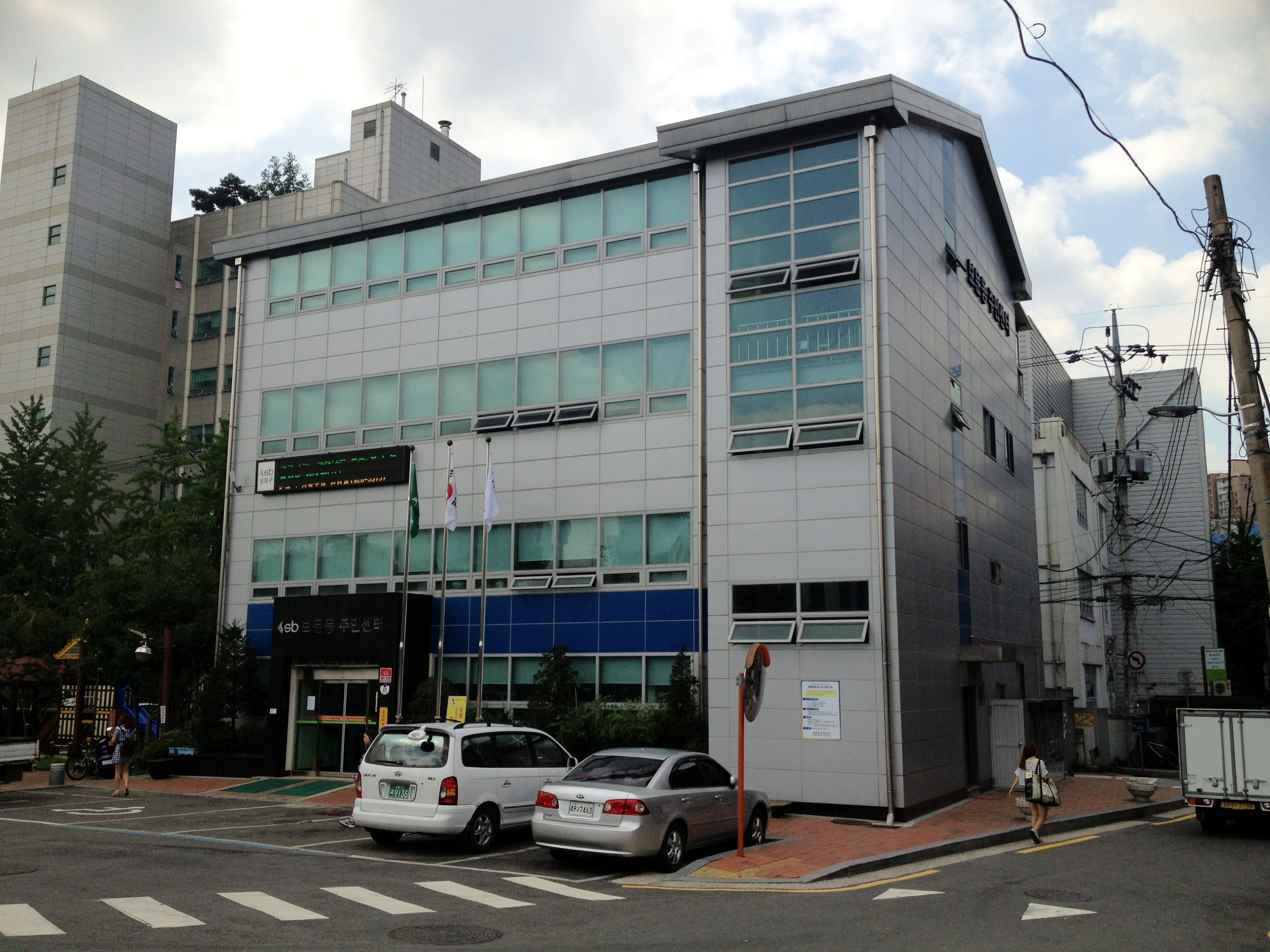
- Bomun-dong Community Service Center
- Interactive map of Bomun-dong
- Coordinates: 37.580°N 127.023°E
- Country: South Korea
- Region: Sudogwon
- Special City: Seoul
- District: Seongbuk

Area
  - Total: 0.55 km^{2} (0.21 sq mi)

Population (2001)
  - Total: 18,181
  - Density: 33,000/km^{2} (86,000/sq mi)

Korean name
- Hangul: 보문동
- Hanja: 普門洞
- RR: Bomun-dong
- MR: Pomun-dong

Bomun-dong (Korean: 보문동) is a dong (neighborhood) of Seongbuk District, Seoul, South Korea.

== See also ==
- Administrative divisions of South Korea
