= Anam-dong =

Coordinates: 37.586°N 127.021°E

- Anam-dong Community Service Center
- Interactive map of Anam-dong
- Country: South Korea

Area
  - Total: 1.32 km^{2} (0.51 sq mi)

Population (2001)
  - Total: 18,368
  - Density: 13,900/km^{2} (36,000/sq mi)

Korean name
- Hangul: 안암동
- Hanja: 安岩洞
- RR: Anam-dong
- MR: Anam-dong

Anam-dong (Korean: 안암동) is a dong, in the district of Seongbuk District, in Seoul, South Korea.

== Notable places ==
- Korea University
- Gaeunsa (개운사 開運寺)
- Botasa (보타사 普陀寺)
- Seongbuk stream (성북천)

== See also ==
- Administrative divisions of South Korea
