= 世運 =

世運 (pinyin: shìyùn), meaning “world, destiny”, may refer to:

- Seun (disambiguation), the Korean transliteration
  - Seun Sangga (세운상가; 世運商街), a shopping area in Jongno-gu, Seoul
- Shiyun (disambiguation), the Chinese transliteration
  - World Games metro station (世運/國家體育園區站), Kaohsiung Metro, Taiwan
  - Li Qi (314–338), courtesy name Shiyun (世運), an emperor of the Cheng-Han dynasty of China
