= Noryangjin Fisheries Wholesale Market =

Fish market in Seoul, South Korea

Coordinates: 37°30′54.83″N 126°56′27.83″E

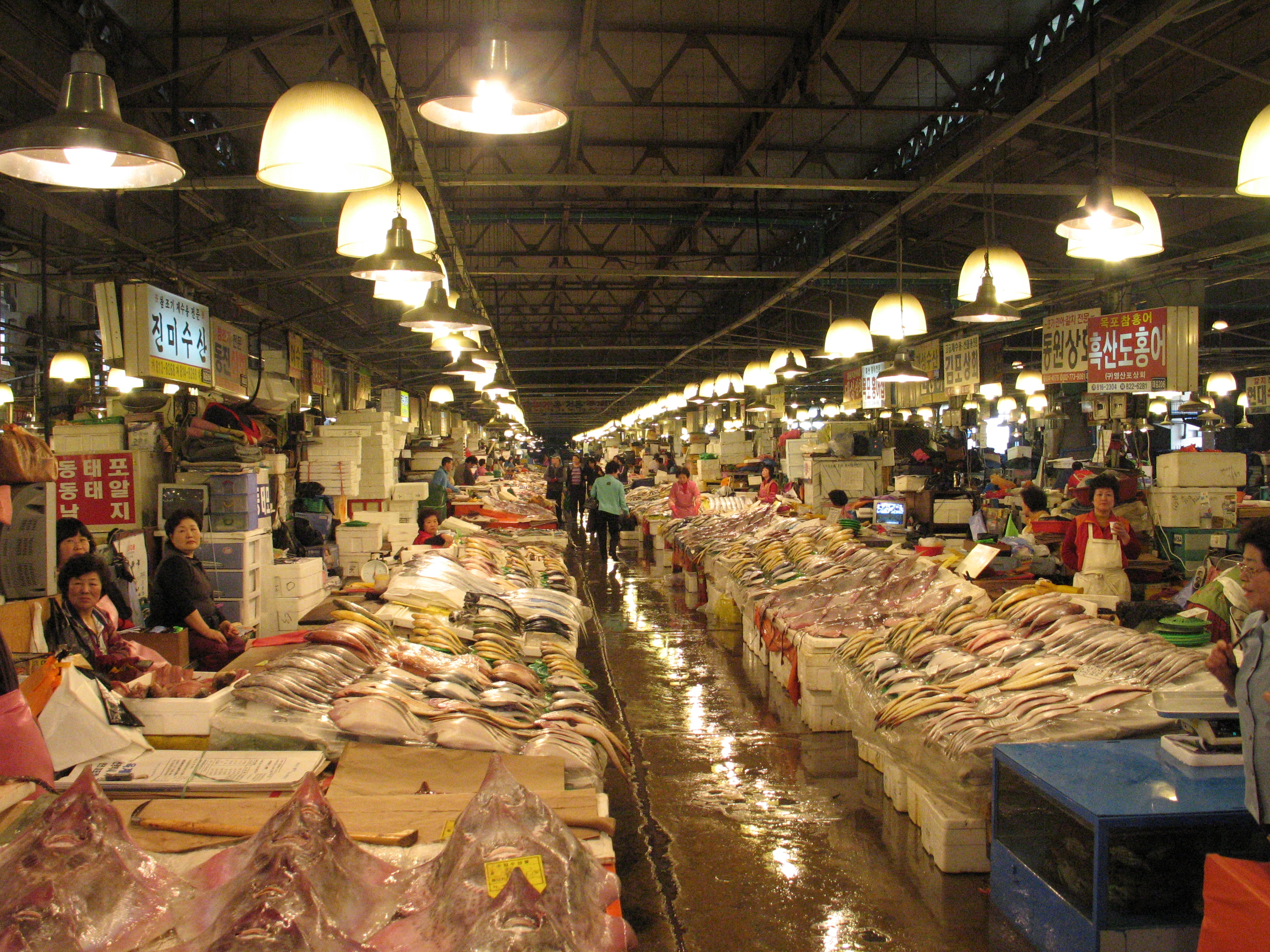
- View of the market

Korean name
- Hangul: 노량진수산시장
- Hanja: 鷺梁津水産市場
- RR: Noryangjin susan sijang
- MR: Noryangjin susan sijang

Noryangjin Fisheries Wholesale Market or shortly Noryangjin Fish Market (Korean: 노량진 수산시장) is an extensive farmers fish market in the neighborhood of Noryangjin-dong in Dongjak District, Seoul, South Korea. It is located east of 63 Building, and just south of the Han River. Metro line 1 passes through at Noryangin station near-by. Exit the station at exit 1 and walk under the bridge. It is open 24/7.

Noryangjin Fish Market was established in 1927 as Gyeongseong Susan (경성수산) on Uijuro (의주로) in Jung District near Seoul Station and moved to its current location in central Seoul in 1971.

In a poll of nearly 2,000 foreign visitors, conducted by the Seoul Metropolitan Government in November 2011, stated that visiting the Market is one of their favorite activities in Seoul.

== Gallery ==
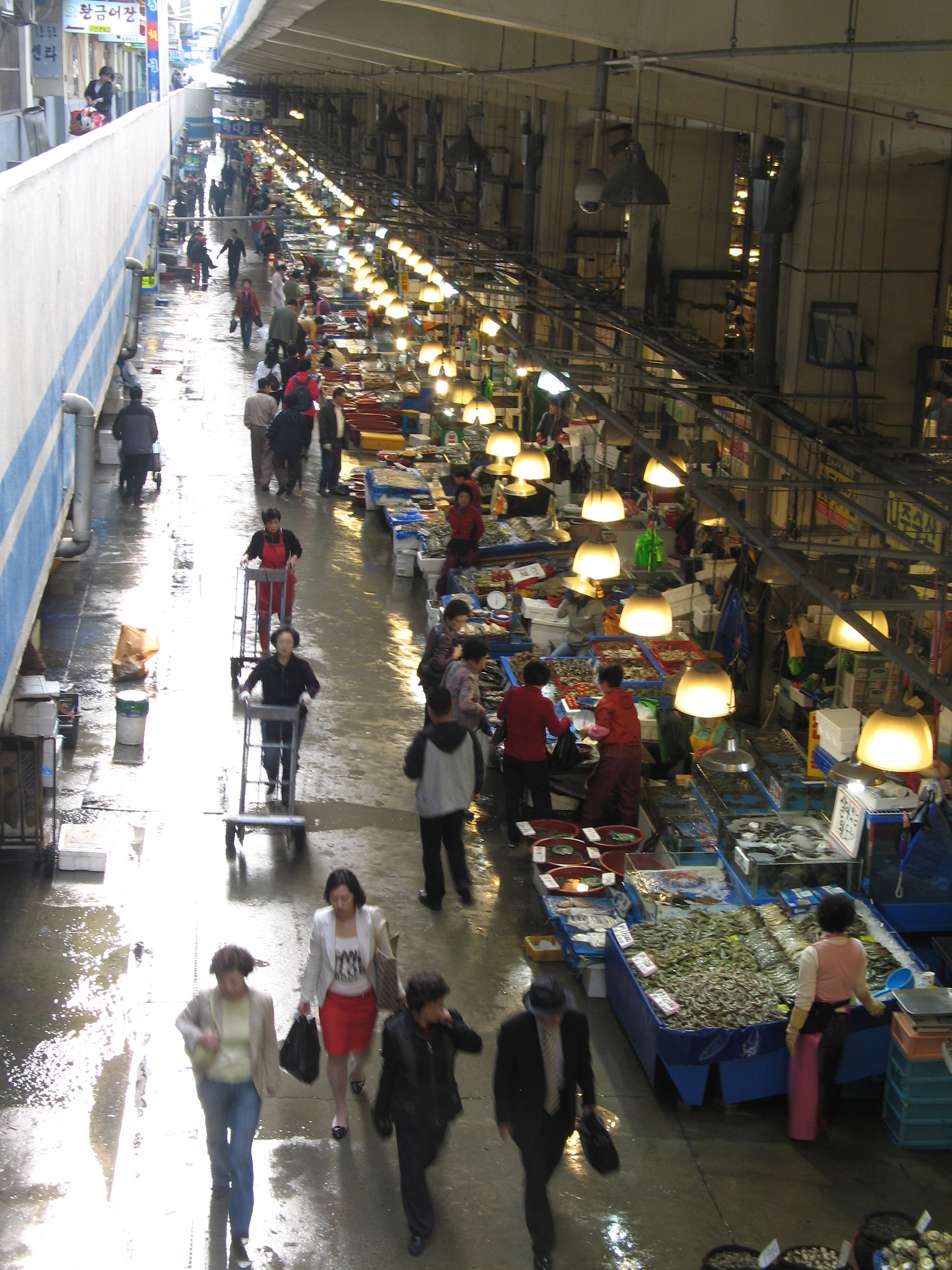

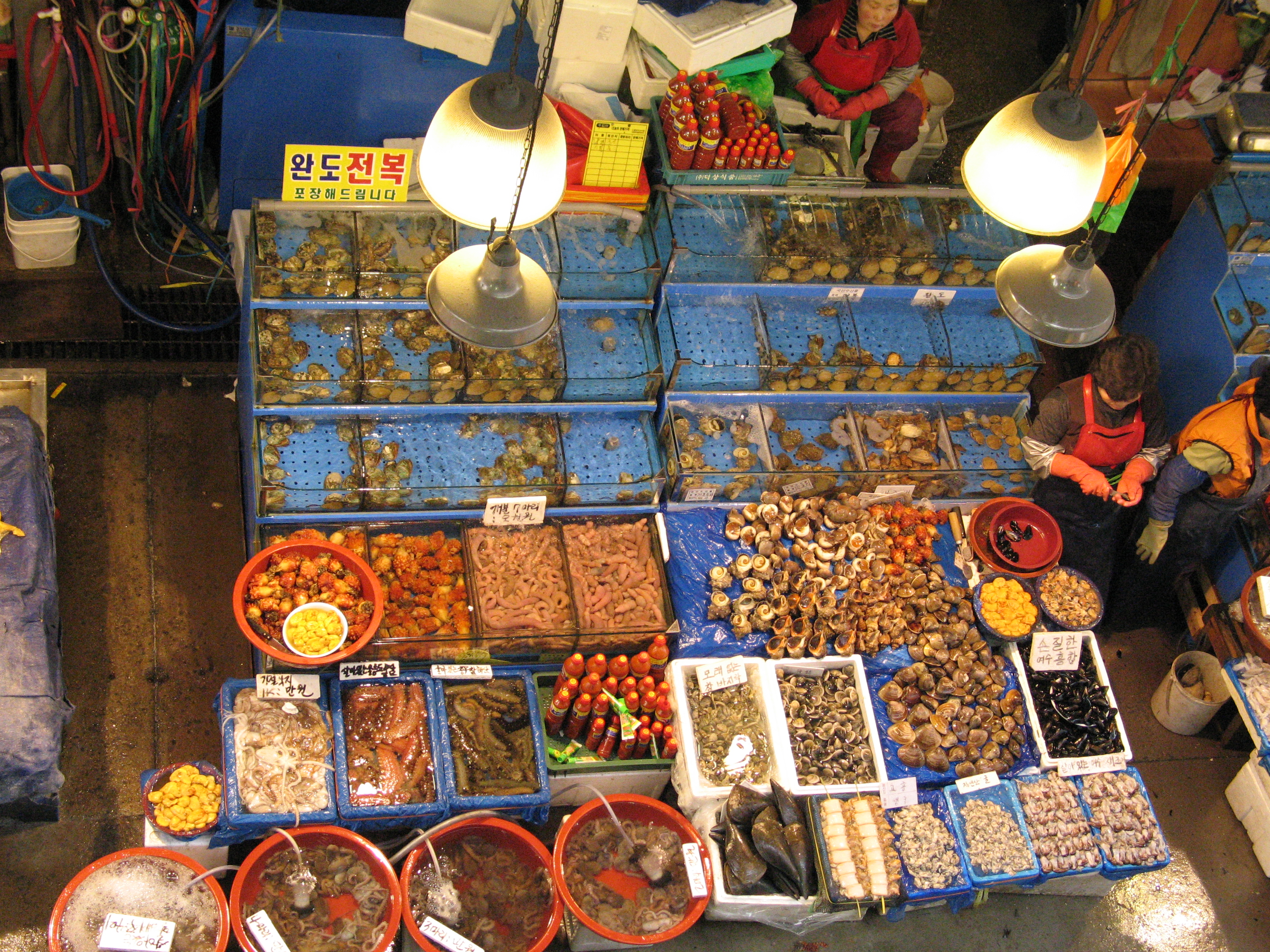

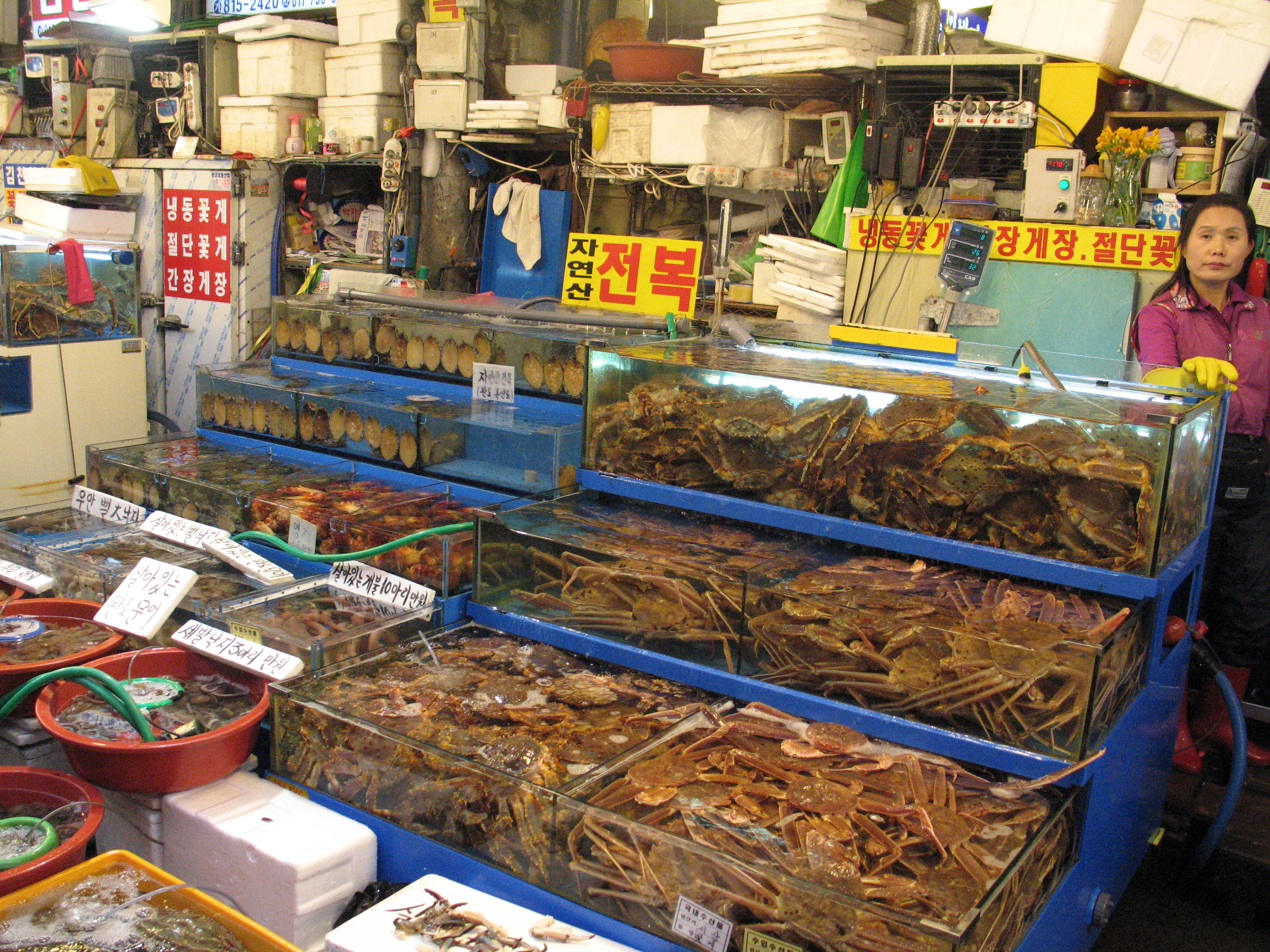

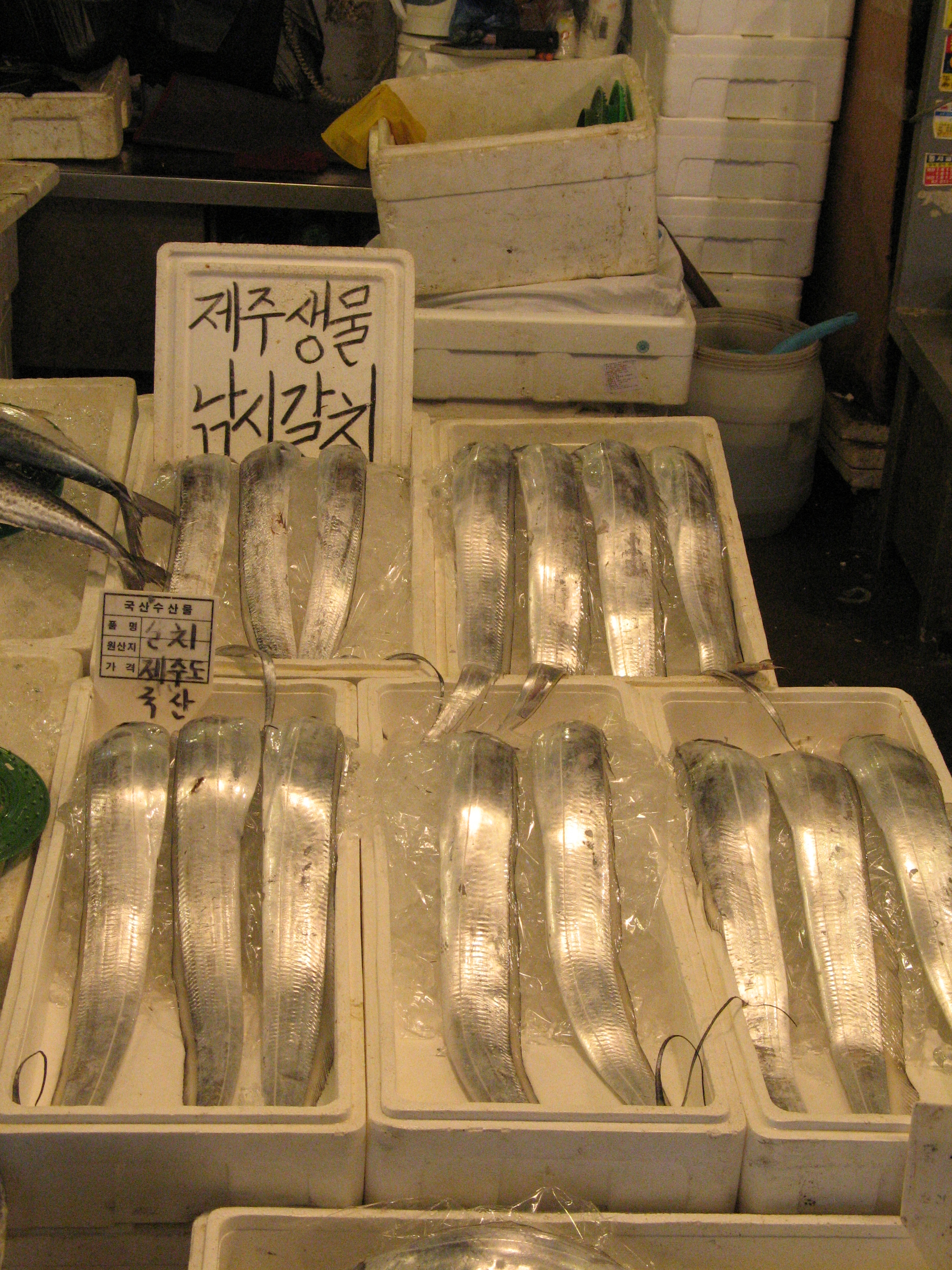

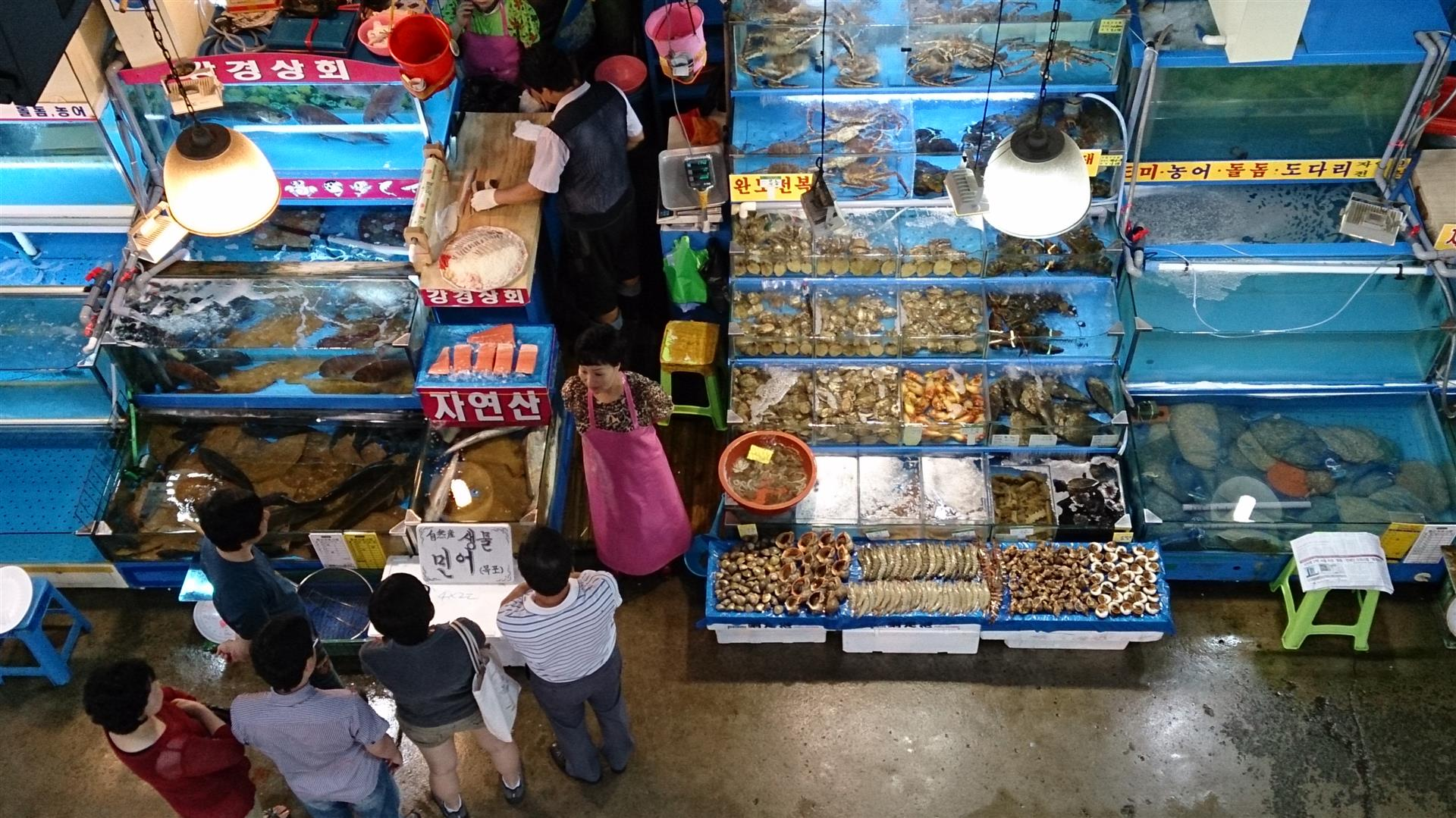

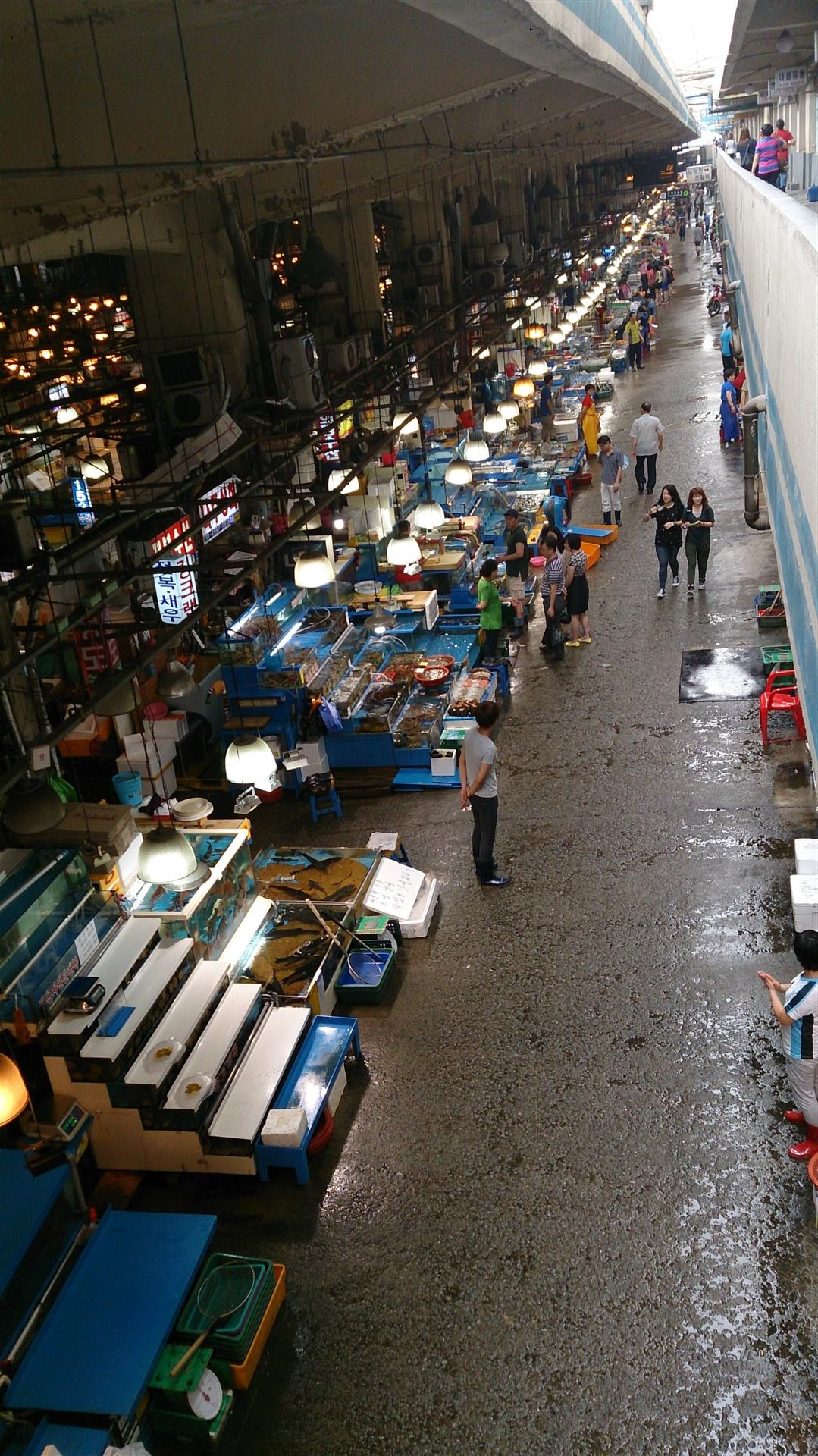

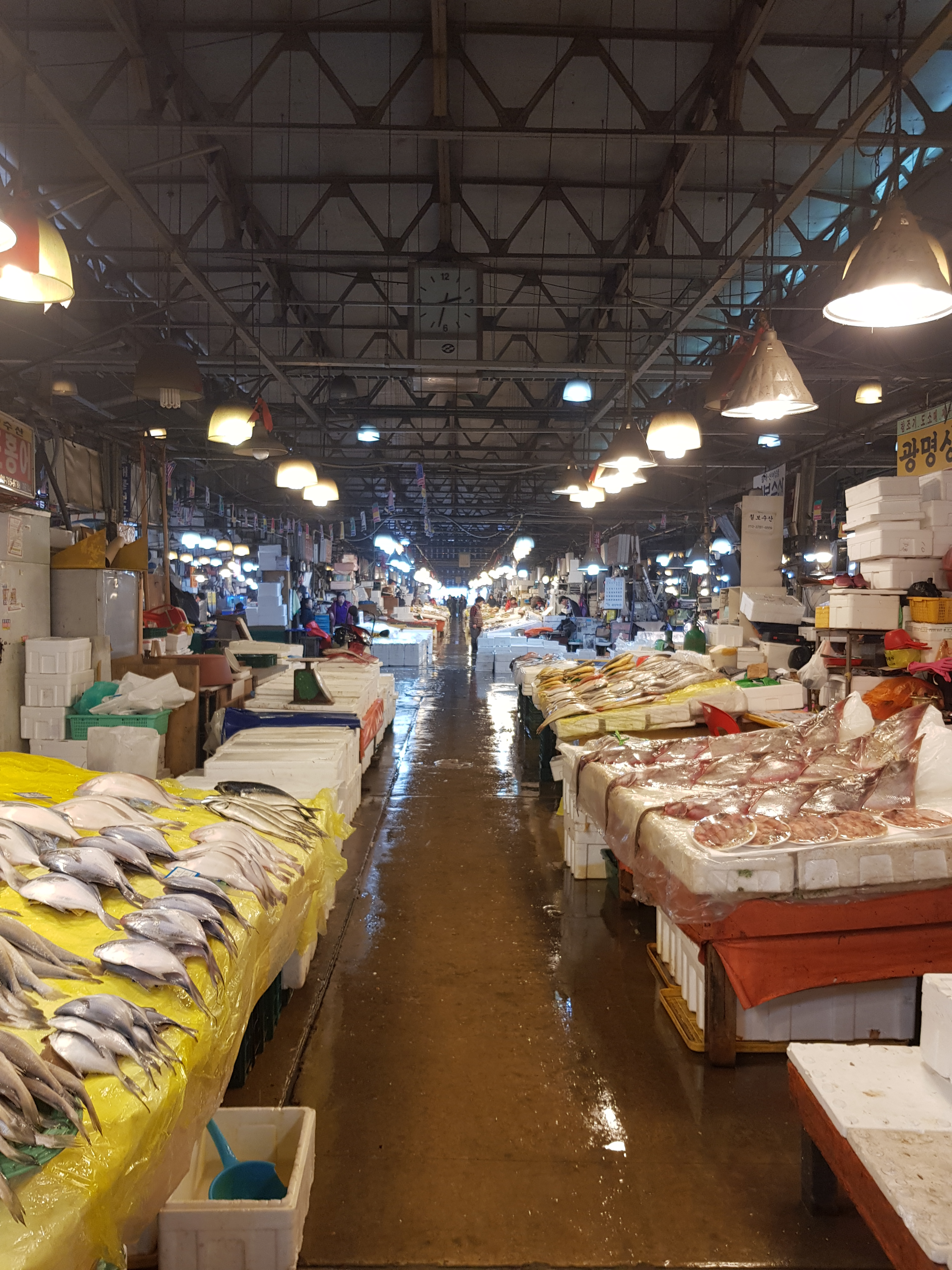

== See also ==
- List of markets in South Korea
- List of South Korean tourist attractions
