= Yakhyeon Catholic Church =

First modern building in Korea

Coordinates: 37.5591°N 126.9673°E

- 약현성당
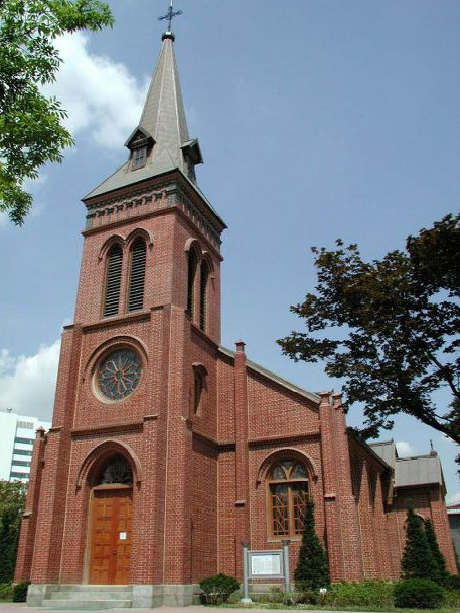
- Yakhyeon Catholic Church
- Location: Seoul
- Country: South Korea
- Denomination: Roman Catholic Church

Architecture
- Heritage designation: Historic Site
- Designated: 1977-11-22

Yakhyeon Catholic Church (Korean: 약현성당; Hanja: 藥峴聖堂) is a historic church in Jungnim-dong, Jung District, Seoul, South Korea. It is the first modern Western-style building to be built in Korea, having been completed in 1892.

The parish is a part of the Archdiocese of Seoul. The official name is Church of St. Joseph. It is a designated Historic Site of South Korea.

== History ==
The church's congregation was initially established in 1891; it was based in a traditional hanok-style building. It initially went by the name Pansŏkpang (반석방; 盤石坊; Banseokbang). It was built on the site of the home of Yi Sŭnghun (이승훈), who was beheaded during the Catholic Persecution of 1801. After the congregation outgrew the premises, they moved to build a larger church.

The new church building was established in 1892 by the French Catholic missionary Fr. Eugene Jean Georges Coste of the Society of Foreign Missions of Paris, as a result of Korea gaining religious freedom in 1886. It was the first modern Western-style building in Korea and the first Catholic church building in Seoul. Its shape is cruciform (cross-shaped).

The building measures 12 by 32 meters. The structure was damaged by an arson attack in 1998, but restored. Its doors are reportedly never locked, as it is meant to be a public sanctuary.

Pope Francis visited the church in 2014. The church is reportedly the most popular site for Catholic marriages in the city. On Christmas Eve in 2022, the President of South Korea Yoon Suk Yeol attended mass here; he is a baptized Catholic.
