= Uijuro =

Korean transcription(s)
  - Hangul: 의주로
  - Hanja: 義州路
  - Revised Romanization: Uijuro
  - McCune–Reischauer: Ŭijuro
- Country: South Korea

Uijuro (Korean: 의주로) is a legal dong (neighbourhood) of Jung District, Seoul, South Korea. It is administered by its administrative dongs, Sogong-dong and Jungnim-dong.

== See also ==
- Administrative divisions of South Korea
