= KMST =

KMST may refer to:

- KMST (FM), a radio station (88.5 FM) licensed to Rolla, Missouri, United States
- KMST (Monterey), a local educational cable channel in Monterey, California, United States
- KION-TV, a television station (channel 46 analog/32 digital) licensed to Monterey, California, United States, which held the call sign KMST until October 1993
- Korean Maritime Safety Tribunal
- KMST, the Indian Railways station code for Kamshet railway station, Pune, Maharashtra, India
