= Sunhwa-dong =

Neighbourhood in Seoul, South Korea

- Country: South Korea

Korean name
- Hangul: 순화동
- Hanja: 巡和洞
- RR: Sunhwa-dong
- MR: Sunhwa-dong

Sunhwa-dong (Korean: 순화동) is a legal dong (neighbourhood) of Jung District, Seoul, South Korea. It is administered by its administrative dong, Sogong-dong and Hoehyeon-dong.

MIAT Mongolian Airlines has its Seoul Branch Office in the Soonhwa Building.

The Korean Maritime Safety Tribunal (KMST) formerly had its headquarters in the S1 Building in the community. Its offices are now in Sejong City.

== See also ==
- Administrative divisions of South Korea
