= Russian Embassy School in Seoul =

International school in Seoul, South Korea

Russian Embassy School in Seoul (Russian: Средняя общеобразовательная школа с углубленным изучением иностранного языка при Посольстве России в Республике Корея) is a Russian international school in Seosomun-ro, Jung-gu, Seoul, South Korea. It was created as of May 31, 2002 as a part of the Russian Ministry of Foreign Affairs. It serves up to secondary school.
