= Seun =

Seun is a unisex Nigerian name that means "thanks". The full form is usually "Oluwaseun" which means "thank God".

Given name

Seun Adigun (born in march 2011), Nigerian runner [Seun , Nigerian musician

- Seun Omojola, Nigerian singer, songwriter and actress
- Seun Osewa, Nigerian internet entrepreneur
- Seun Ogunkoya (born 1977), Nigerian sprinter

Surname

- Abayomi Owonikoko Seun (born 1992), Nigerian-Georgian football player
- Olulayo Seun (born 1996), Nigerian football player

== See also ==
- Seun Sangga a shopping area in Seoul, South Korea
