= Dasan-dong =

Neighborhood in Seoul, South Korea

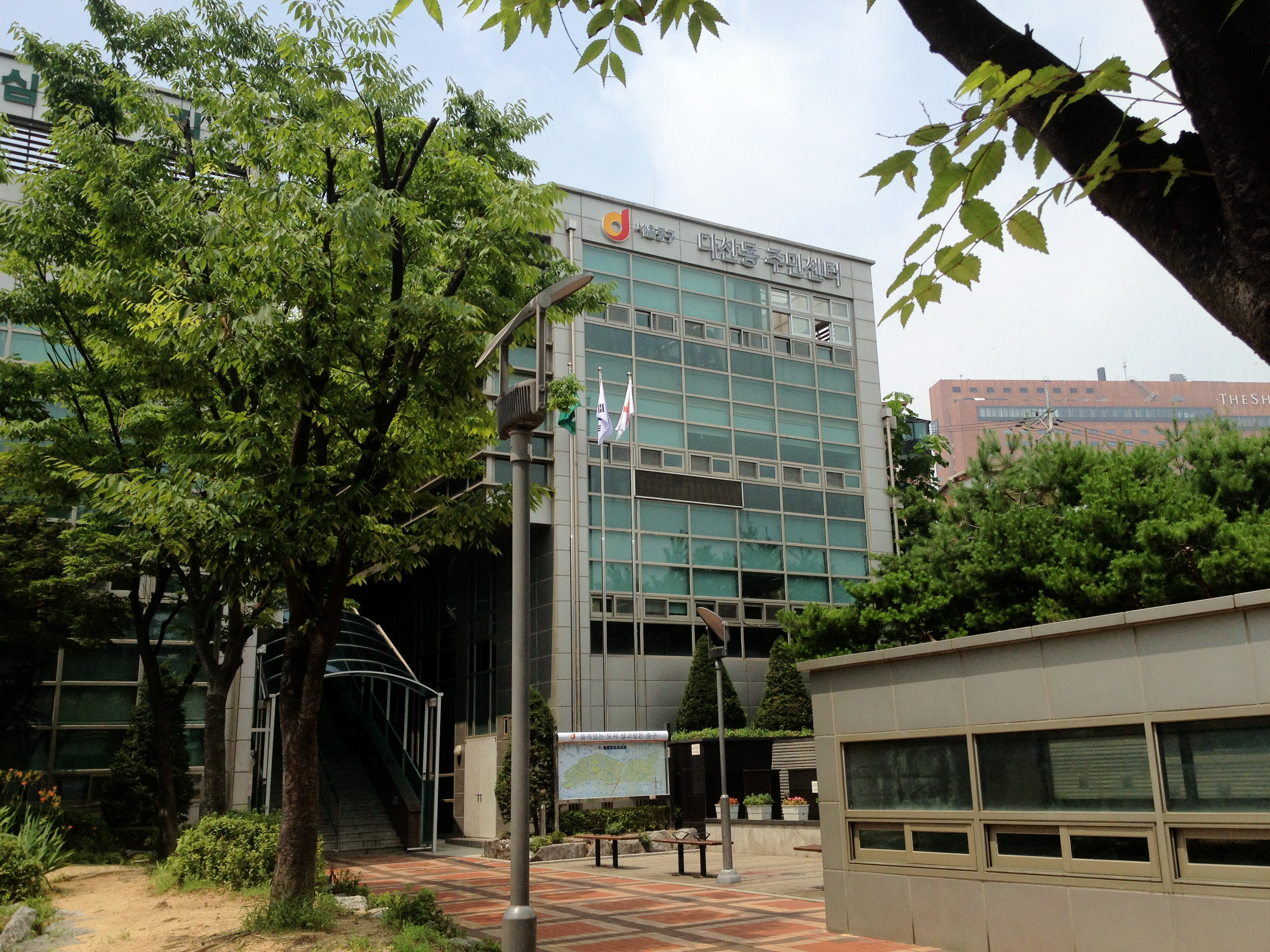
- Dasan-dong Resident Office

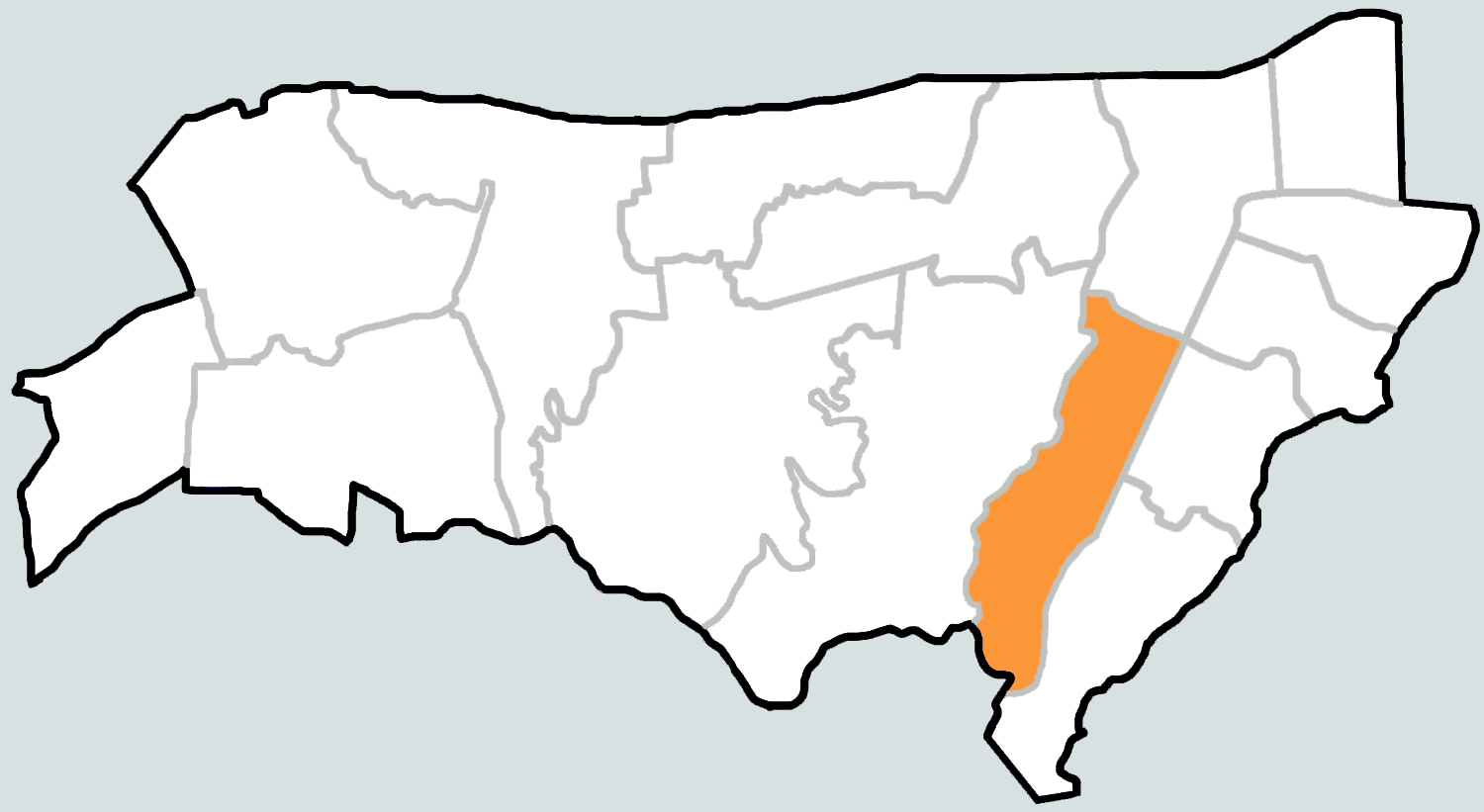
- Dasan-dong within Jung-gu
- Country: South Korea

Area
  - Total: 0.51 km^{2} (0.20 sq mi)

Population (2013)
  - Total: 16,246
  - Density: 32,000/km^{2} (83,000/sq mi)

Korean name
- Hangul: 다산동
- Hanja: 茶山洞
- RR: Dasan-dong
- MR: Tasan-dong

Dasan-dong (Korean: 다산동) is a dong (neighborhood) of Jung District, Seoul, South Korea.

== Transportation ==
- Cheonggu Station of and of
- Yaksu Station of and of
- Beotigogae Station of

== See also ==
- Administrative divisions of South Korea
