= Sindang 5-dong =

Neighbourhood in Seoul, South Korea

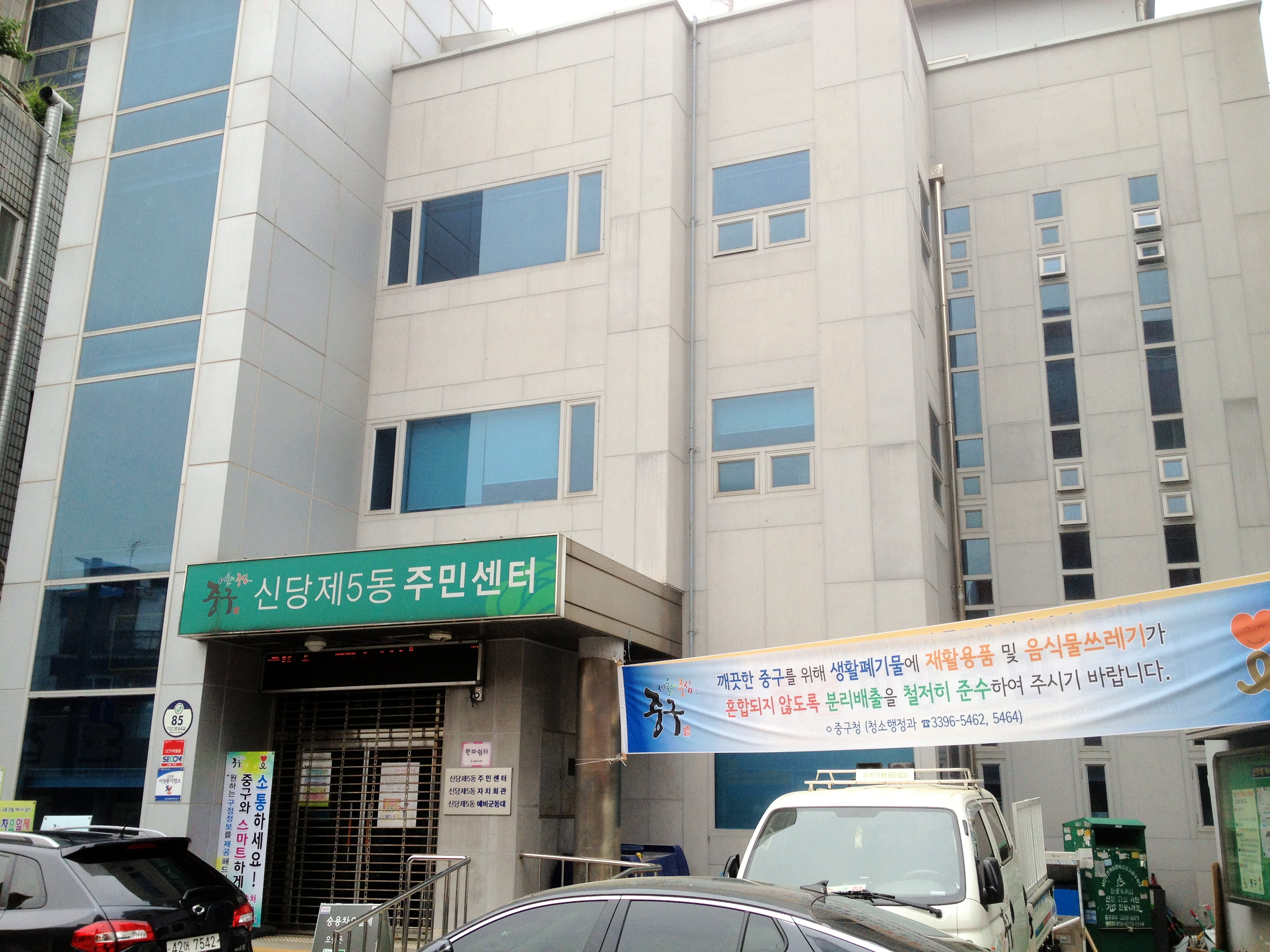
- Sindang 5-dong Resident Office

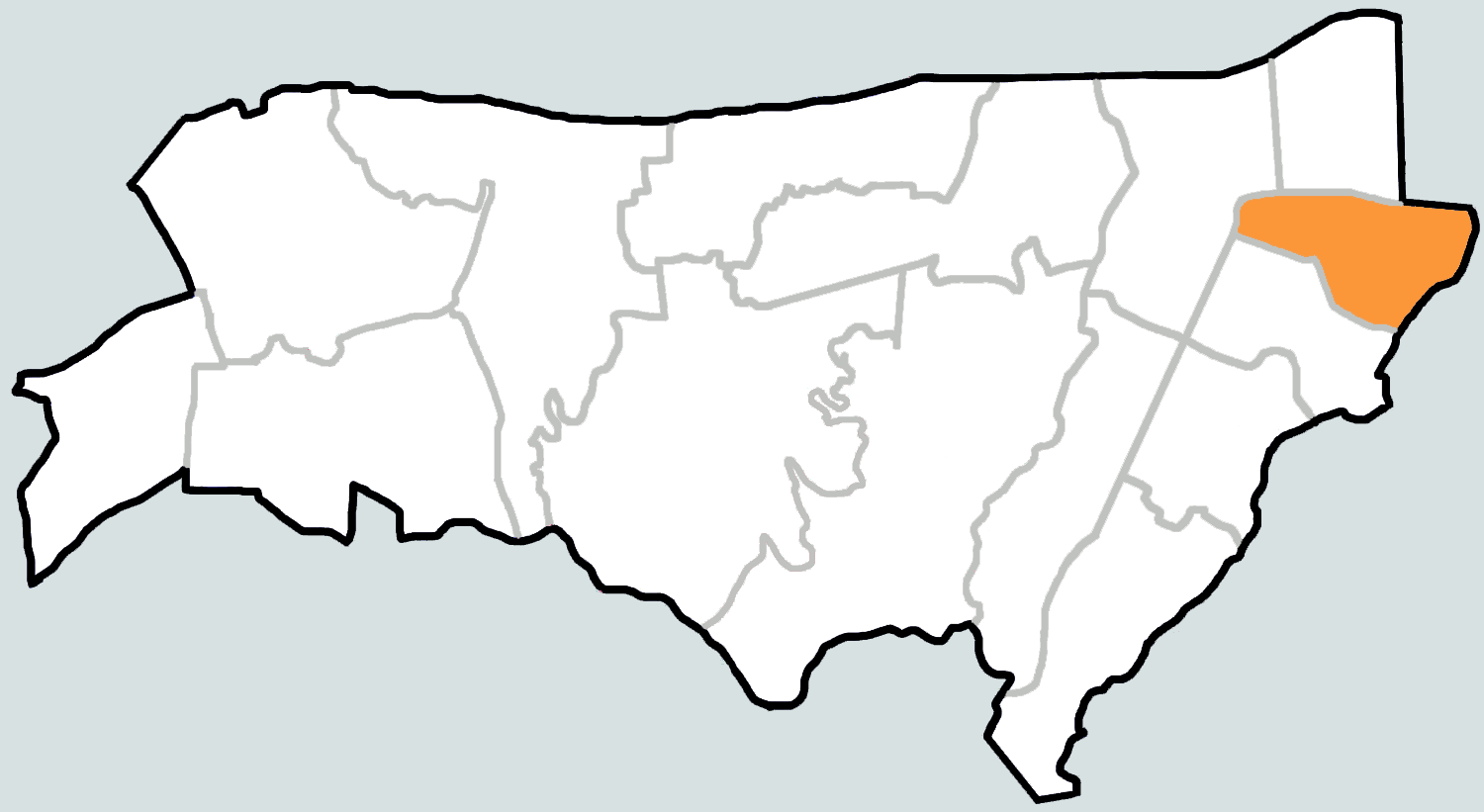
- Sindang 5-dong within Jung-gu
- Country: South Korea

Area
  - Total: 0.39 km^{2} (0.15 sq mi)

Population (2013)
  - Total: 10,386
  - Density: 27,000/km^{2} (69,000/sq mi)

Korean name
- Hangul: 신당제5동
- Hanja: 新堂第5洞
- RR: Sindang je5-dong
- MR: Sindang che5-dong

Sindang 5-dong (Korean: 신당제5동) is a dong (neighbourhood) of Jung District, Seoul, South Korea.

== Name origin ==
The name of the neighborhood called Sindang-dong originated from an old village where there was a shrine to worship gods.

== Transportation ==
- Sindang Station of and of

== See also ==
- Administrative divisions of South Korea
