= Noryangjin-dong =

Neighborhood in Seoul, South Korea

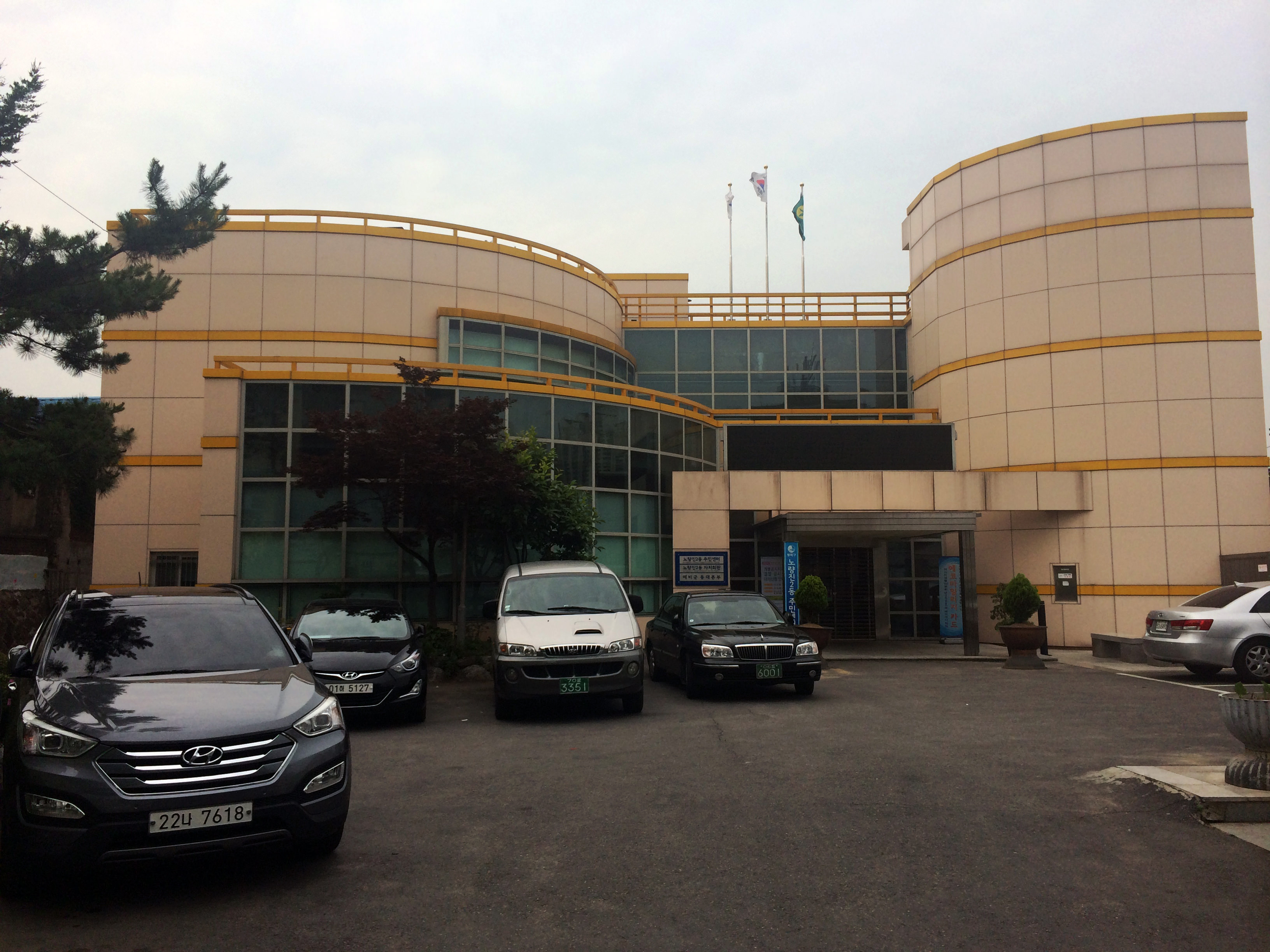
- Noryangjin 2-dong Community Service Center
- Country: South Korea

Area
  - Total: 1.48 km^{2} (0.57 sq mi)

Population (2001)
  - Total: 45,500
  - Density: 30,743/km^{2} (79,620/sq mi)

Korean name
- Hangul: 노량진동
- Hanja: 鷺梁津洞
- RR: Noryangjin-dong
- MR: Noryangjin-dong

Noryangjin-dong (Korean: 노량진동) is a dong (neighborhood) of Dongjak District, Seoul, South Korea.

The district is known as the location of Noryangjin Fisheries Wholesale Market, one of the largest wholesale seafood markets in the country.

== See also ==
- Administrative divisions of South Korea
