= Donghwa-dong =

Neighborhood in Seoul, South Korea

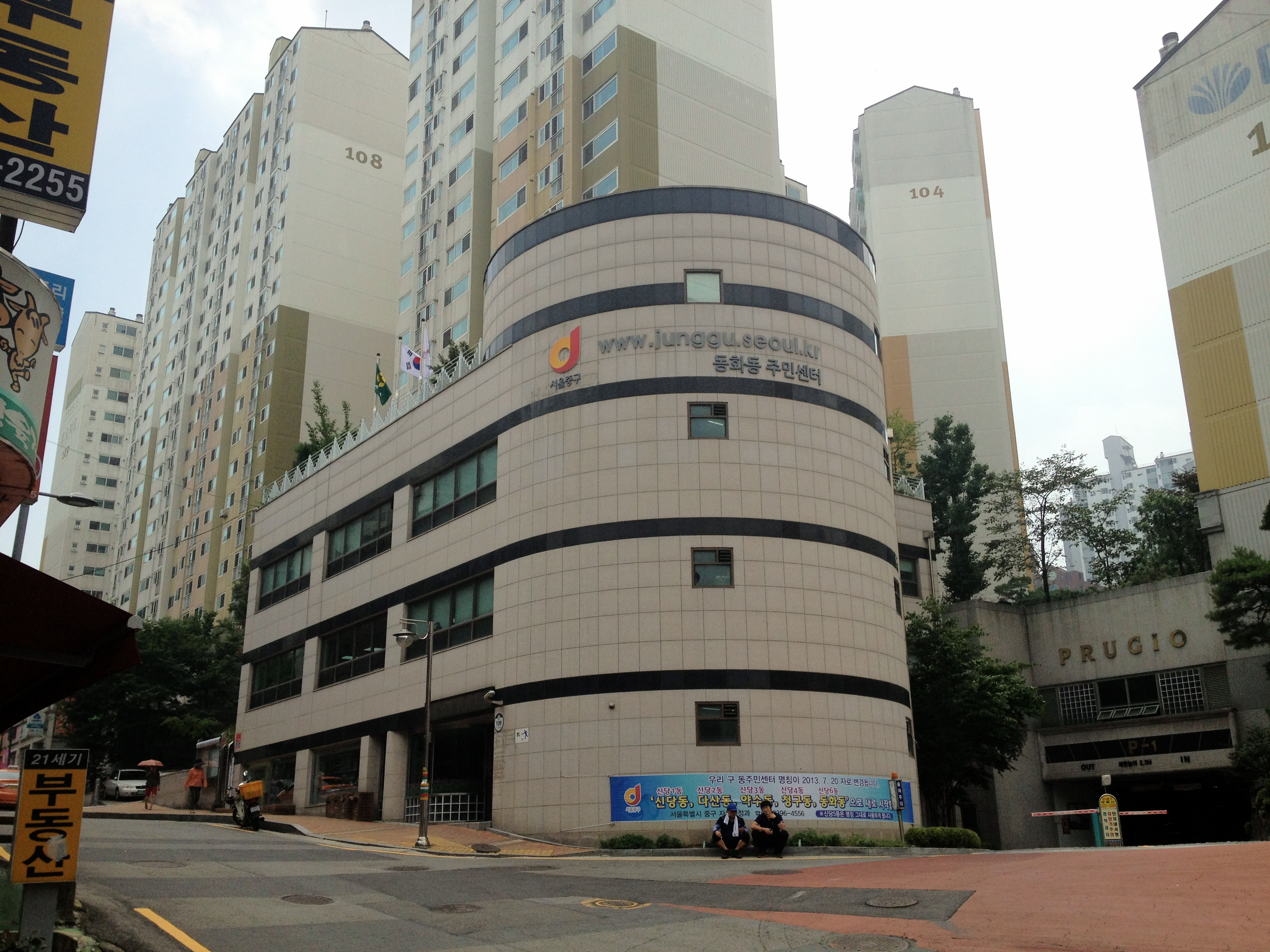
- Donghwa-dong Resident Office

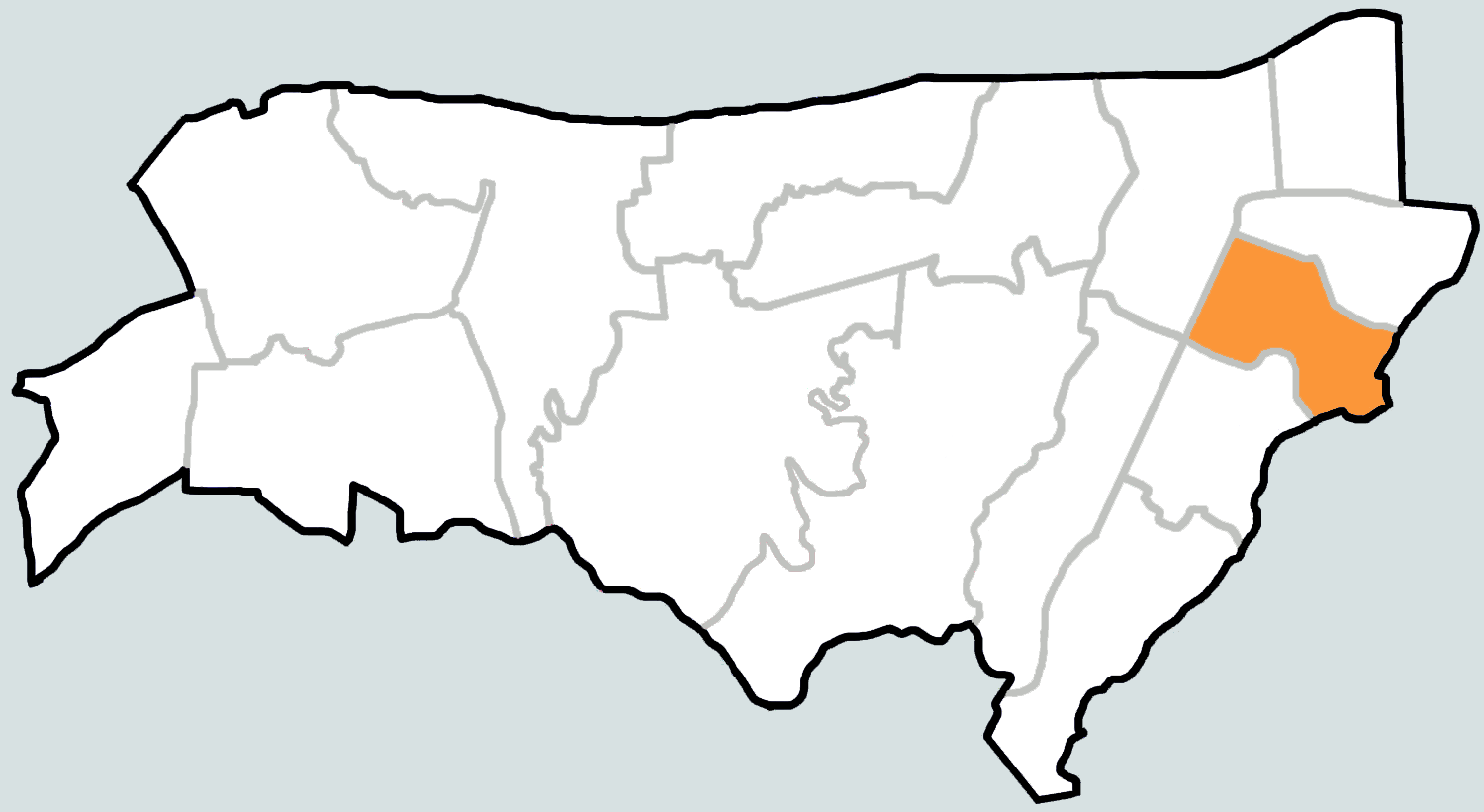
- Donghwa-dong within Jung-gu
- Coordinates: 37.561°N 127.018°E
- Country: South Korea

Area
  - Total: 0.26 km^{2} (0.10 sq mi)

Population (2013)
  - Total: 11,953
  - Density: 46,000/km^{2} (120,000/sq mi)

Korean name
- Hangul: 동화동
- Hanja: 東化洞
- RR: Donghwa-dong
- MR: Tonghwa-dong

Donghwa-dong (Korean: 동화동) is a dong (neighborhood) of Jung District, Seoul, South Korea.

== Overview ==
Donghwa-dong is an administrative dong located in the eastern part of Jung-gu. It shares its eastern border with Seongdong District and is connected to Ahyeok-dong to the south within the same district. To the west, it borders Sindong-dong, and to the north, it is adjacent to Sindong 5-dong. Originally, the administrative dongs in this area were designated with numerical names from Sindong 1-dong to Sindong 6-dong, assigned by the government in a mechanical manner. Subsequently, a resident survey was conducted to select new names from publicly solicited candidates. Consequently, on July 20, 2013, all dongs, except Sindong 5-dong, underwent a simultaneous name change, with Sindong 6-dong being renamed as "Donghwa-dong."

== Transportation ==
- Cheonggu Station of and of

== See also ==
- Administrative divisions of South Korea
