= Seun Sangga =

Coordinates: 37.5693°N 126.9952°E

- Hangul: 세운상가
- Hanja: 世運商街
- Revised Romanization: Seun Sangga
- McCune–Reischauer: Seun Sangga
- Variously translated as Seun Sangga, Sewoon Sangga, Seun Shopping Centre, Sewoon Shopping Centre, Seun Shopping Mall, Sewoon Shopping Mall, etc.

Seun Sangga is a shopping area located between Jongno 3-ga and Toegyero 3-ga, Jongno-gu, Seoul. Consisting of eight Brutalist buildings in a row, the tallest of which reached 17 floors, it was designed by Kim Swoo-geun and built in 1966 on top of cleared slums, in what The Hankyoreh described in an editorial as "a symbol of the indiscriminate redevelopment that occurred during the dictatorship years". In the 1970s, it became known for its pornography vendors; however, in the late 1990s, business declined due to the rise of internet pornography.

== Redevelopment ==
There have been several redevelopment plans about this shopping area. In 2006, Jung-gu suggested a plan to build a megatall skyscraper with the height of 960m and 220-storied, known as Tour Financial Hub Center, but due to the height restrictions in central Seoul, the project was abandoned.

== Other information ==
Hours of Operation

- Daily: 09:00 – 19:00 (Varies by store)
- Closed: Sundays
- Public Holidays: Closed

Location

- Address: 03194, 159, Cheonggyecheon-ro, Jongno-gu, Seoul, South Korea

Transportation

- Subway: Lines 1, 3, 5, Jongno 3(sam)-ga Station
