= Cheonggu-dong =

Neighborhood in Seoul, South Korea

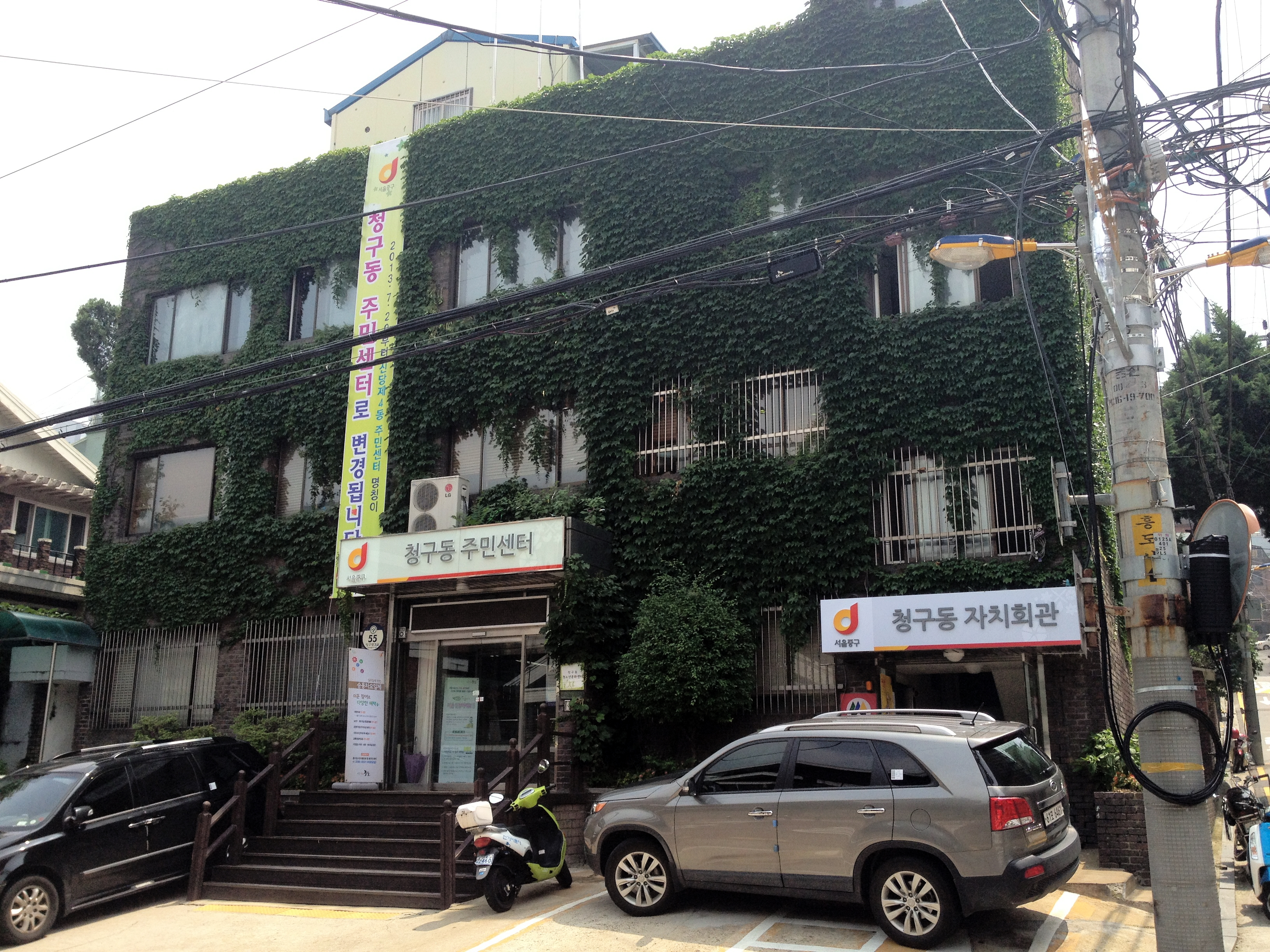
- Cheonggu-dong Resident Office

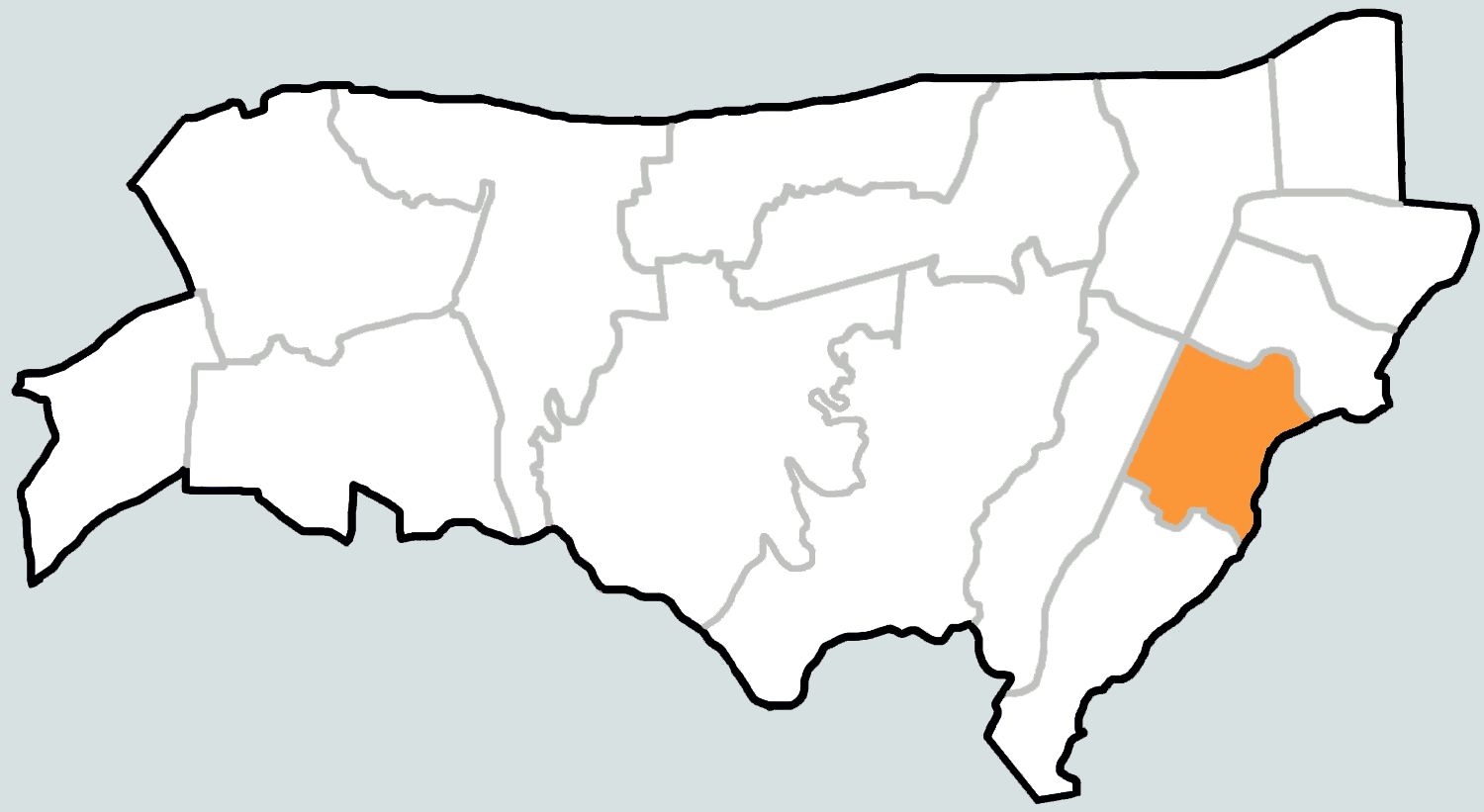
- Cheonggu-dong within Jung-gu
- Coordinates: 37.557°N 127.015°E
- Country: South Korea

Area
  - Total: 0.34 km^{2} (0.13 sq mi)

Population (2013)
  - Total: 15,886
  - Density: 47,000/km^{2} (120,000/sq mi)

Korean name
- Hangul: 청구동
- Hanja: 靑丘洞
- RR: Cheonggu-dong
- MR: Ch'ŏnggu-dong

Cheonggu-dong (Korean: 청구동) is a dong (neighborhood) of Jung District, Seoul, South Korea.

== Overview ==
Cheonggu-dong is a designated administrative neighborhood situated in the eastern region of Jung-gu. It shares its eastern boundary with Joto Ward, while Yaksu-dong lies to the south, Chasan-dong to the west, and Donghwa-dong to the north, all falling within the same administrative ward. Originally, the administrative divisions in this locality were known as Shindang 1-dong through Shindang 6-dong, designated by numerical order without historical significance. Following a resident survey, a new name was selected from various options. Consequently, on 20 July 2013, all cave names were simultaneously changed, with the exception of Shindang 5-dong, which was renamed as "Cheongkyu-dong."

== Transportation ==
- Cheonggu Station of and of

== See also ==
- Administrative divisions of South Korea
