= Korea Maritime Safety Tribunal =

- Hangul: 해양안전심판원
- Hanja: 海洋安全審判院
- RR: Haeyang anjeon simpanwon
- MR: Haeyang anjŏn simp'anwŏn

The Korea Maritime Safety Tribunal (KMST, Korean: 해양안전심판원) is an agency of the government of South Korea that investigates maritime accidents. Its head office is in the Sejong Government Office in Sejong City. It is subordinate to the Ministry of Oceans and Fisheries (MOF). It is also known as the Korean Maritime Safety Tribunal.

At one time its head office was located in the Seodaemun District of Seoul.

At a later period head office was previously located in the S1 Building in Sunhwa-dong, Jung-gu, Seoul.

== See also ==
- Aviation and Railway Accident Investigation Board
