= Tour Financial Hub Center =

General information
- Status: Visionary
- Type: Office
- Location: Seoul, South Korea
- Estimated completion: 2013

Height
- Antenna spire: 960 meters
- Roof: 960 m (3,150 ft)

Technical details
- Floor count: 220

Tour Financial Hub Center (Korean: 금융관광허브빌딩) is a proposed skyscraper in Seoul, South Korea. It was planned by Jung-gu, Seoul in 2006, with the height of 960m (higher than Burj Khalifa). The completion was planned in 2013.

However, due to the height restrictions in Seoul, construction wasn't allowed and it seems unsure in 2016.
