= Shiyun =

Shiyun may refer to:

- Shiyun Township (什运乡), Qiongzhong Li and Miao Autonomous County, Hainan Province, China

== Names ==
Real people

- Shiyun (しゆん), former member of Japanese boy band Strawberry Prince
- Shiyun M. Smith (born 1998), an American football wide receiver
- Shiyun Nakamura (中村シユン; born 1959), a Japanese actor cast in Japanese film Ju-On: Origins and NHK Taiga drama Idaten
- Pan Shiyun (born 1989), a Chinese swimmer
- Sima Shiyun (司馬世雲; died 548), an Eastern Wei official supported Hou Jing
- Fiona Ma (馬世雲; pinyin: Mǎ Shìyún; born 1966), an American accountant and politician
- Ji Yun (1724–1805), other name Shiyun, a Chinese philosopher, politician, and writer
- Li Qi (314–338), courtesy name Shiyun, an emperor of the Cheng-Han dynasty of China
- Selena Lee (born 1981), former stage name Selena Lee Sze-Wan (李詩韻; pinyin: Lǐ Shīyùn), a Canadian actress

Fictional characters

- Peng Shiyun (彭诗韵), a character in Chinese television drama Babies On Board
- Zhang Shiyun (张诗云), a character in Singapore television drama Game Plan
- Zeng Shiyun, a character who portrayed by Hong Huifang in Singapore television drama Viva Le Famille

== See also ==
- World Games metro station, Kaohsiung Metro, Taiwan
