= Jungnim-dong =

Neighbourhood in Seoul, South Korea

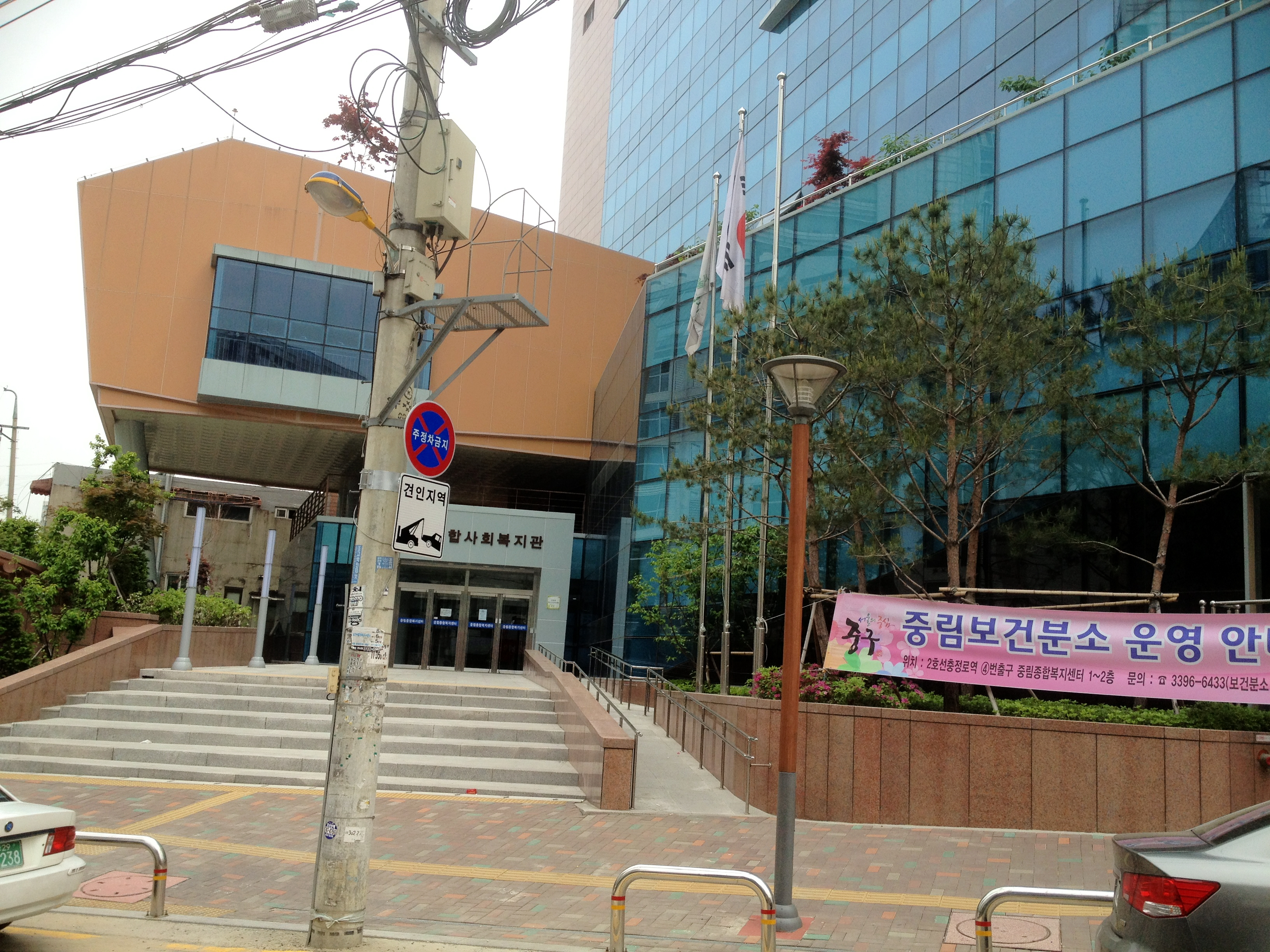
- Jungnim-dong Resident Office

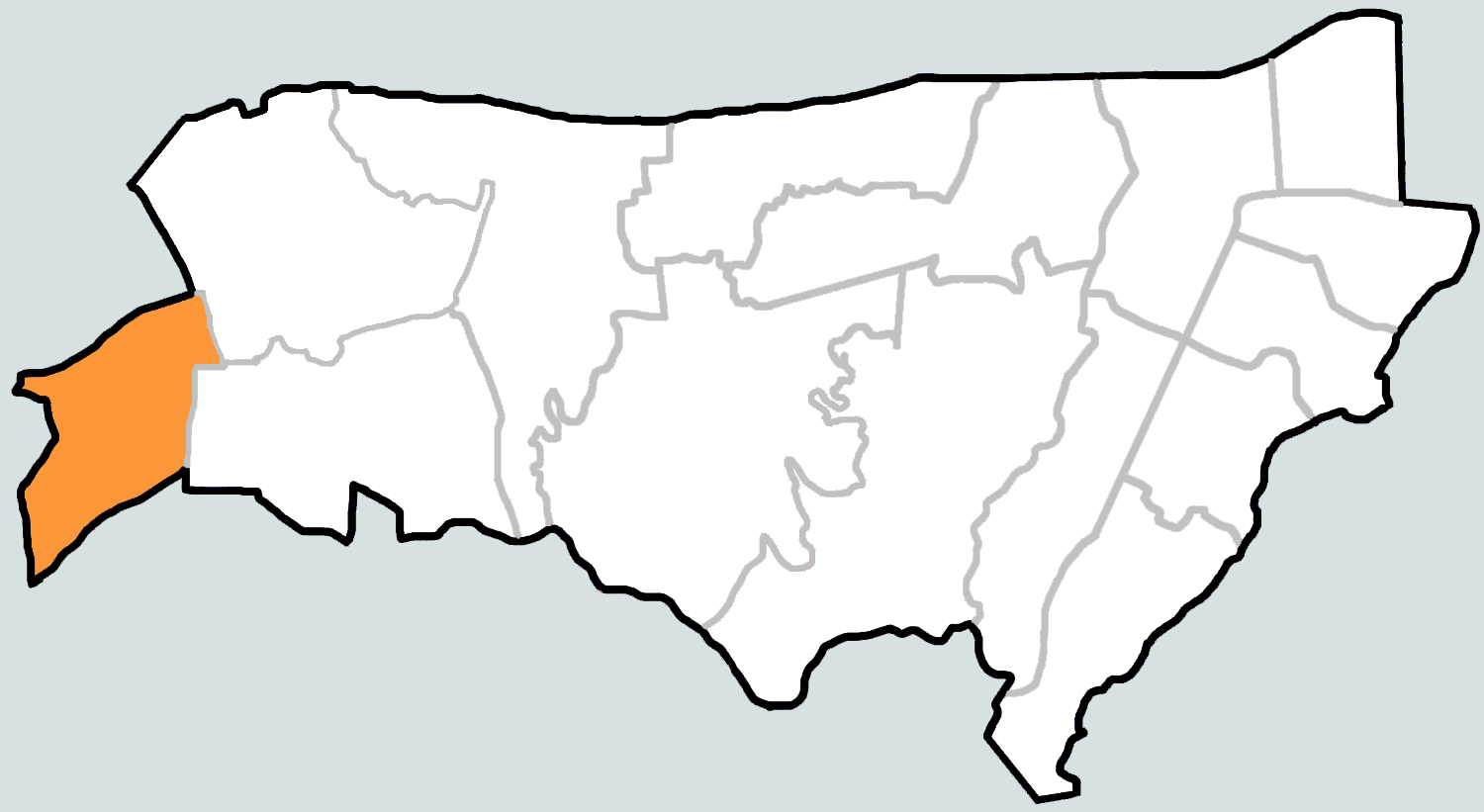
- Coordinates: 37°33′16″N 126°57′54″E
- Country: South Korea

Area
  - Total: 0.48 km^{2} (0.19 sq mi)

Population (2013)
  - Total: 9,986
  - Density: 21,000/km^{2} (54,000/sq mi)

Korean name
- Hangul: 중림동
- Hanja: 中林洞
- RR: Jungnim-dong
- MR: Chungnim-dong

Jungnim-dong (Korean: 중림동) is a dong (neighbourhood) of Jung District, Seoul, South Korea.

== Overview ==
The neighborhood Jungnim-dong got its name by combining parts of "Yakjeonjung-dong" and "Hanrim-dong". Yakjeonjung-dong was named after its historical role as a medicine supplier in Jangan during the Joseon period. Hanrim-dong was named after the Lee Jung-am family, whose three brothers all resided there and served in the Hanrim government during the same period. Other old village names in the area include Gaundong-mal, Hanrim-gol, and Hyungjeumulgol.

== Attractions ==
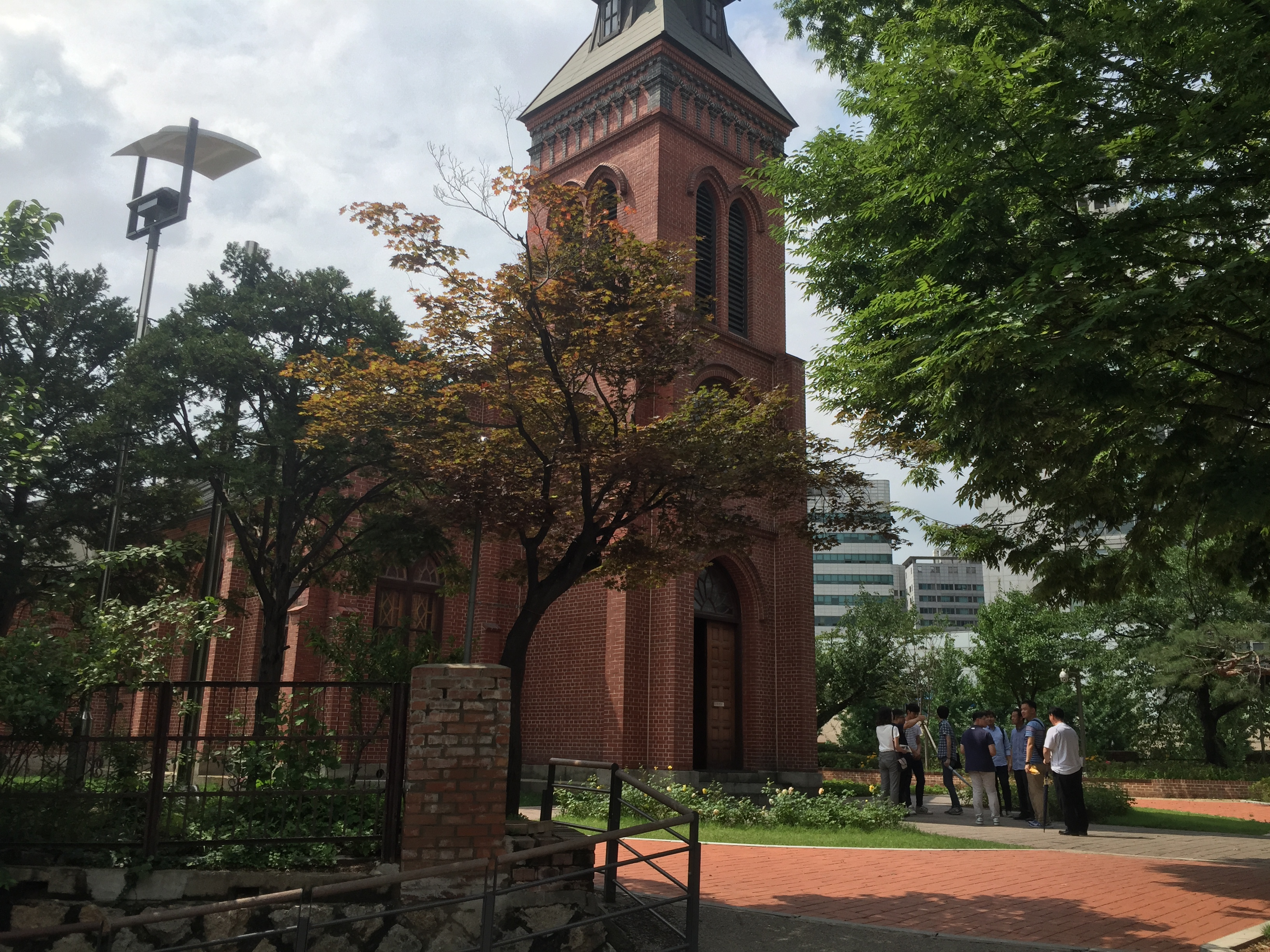
Jungnim-dong Yakhyeon Catholic church Outside

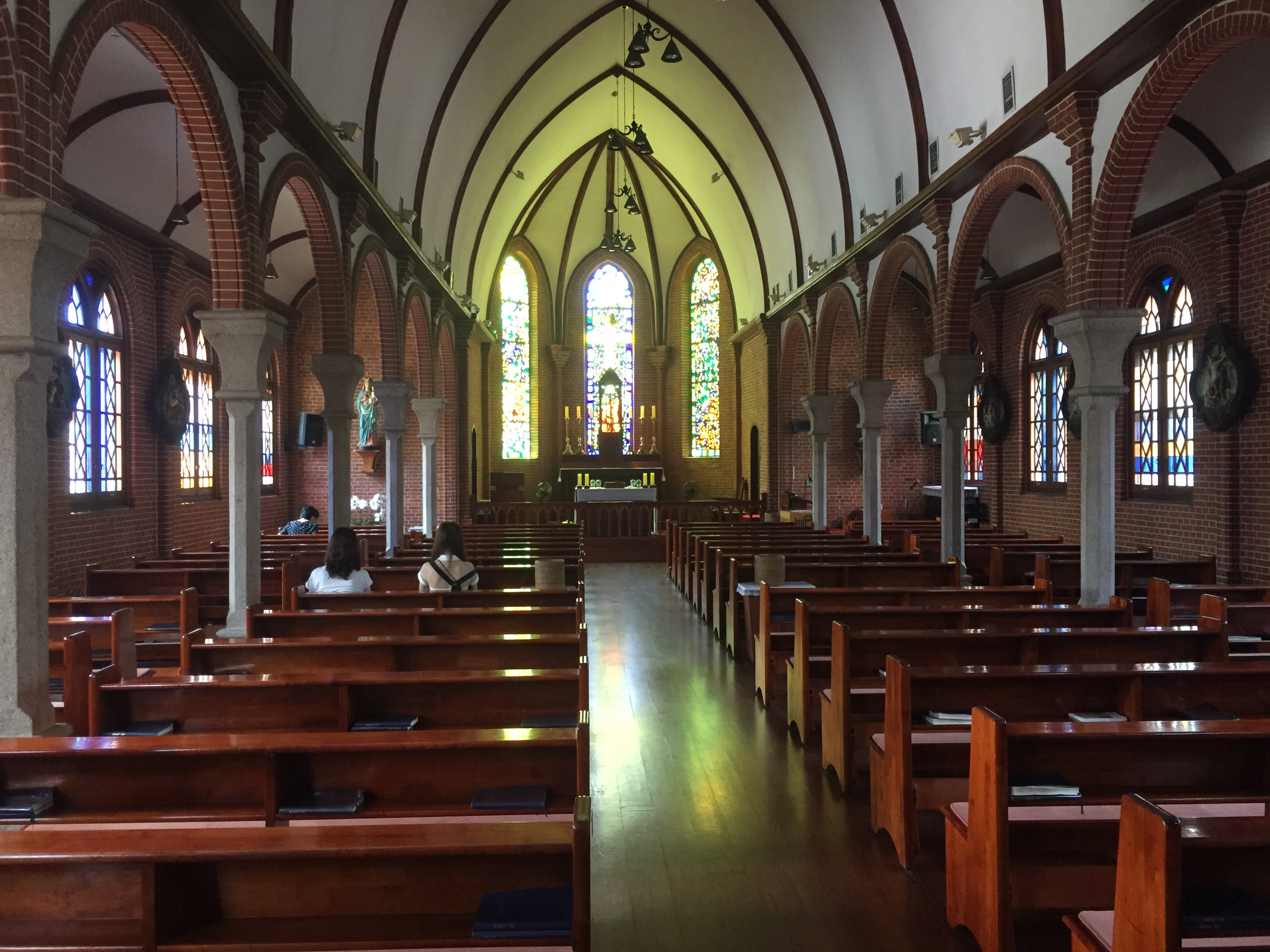
Jungnim-dong Yakhyeon Catholic church Inside

- Yakhyeon Catholic Church (약현성당 藥峴聖堂)
- Son Gi-jeong Park

== Transportation ==
- Chungjeongno Station of

== See also ==
- Administrative divisions of South Korea
- Kim Jeong-ho
