= Jung District, Seoul =

District in South Korea

Jung District
- Autonomous District
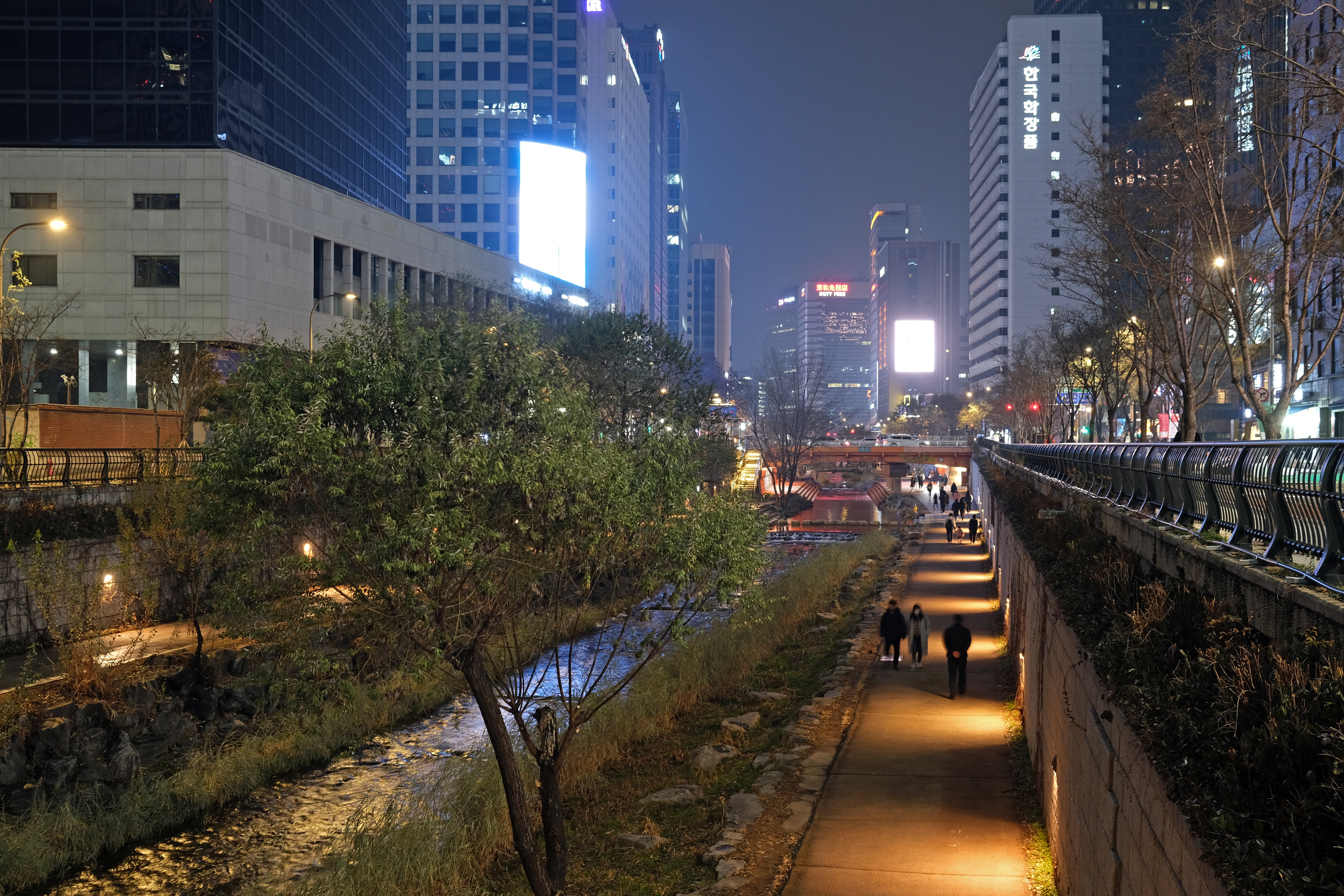
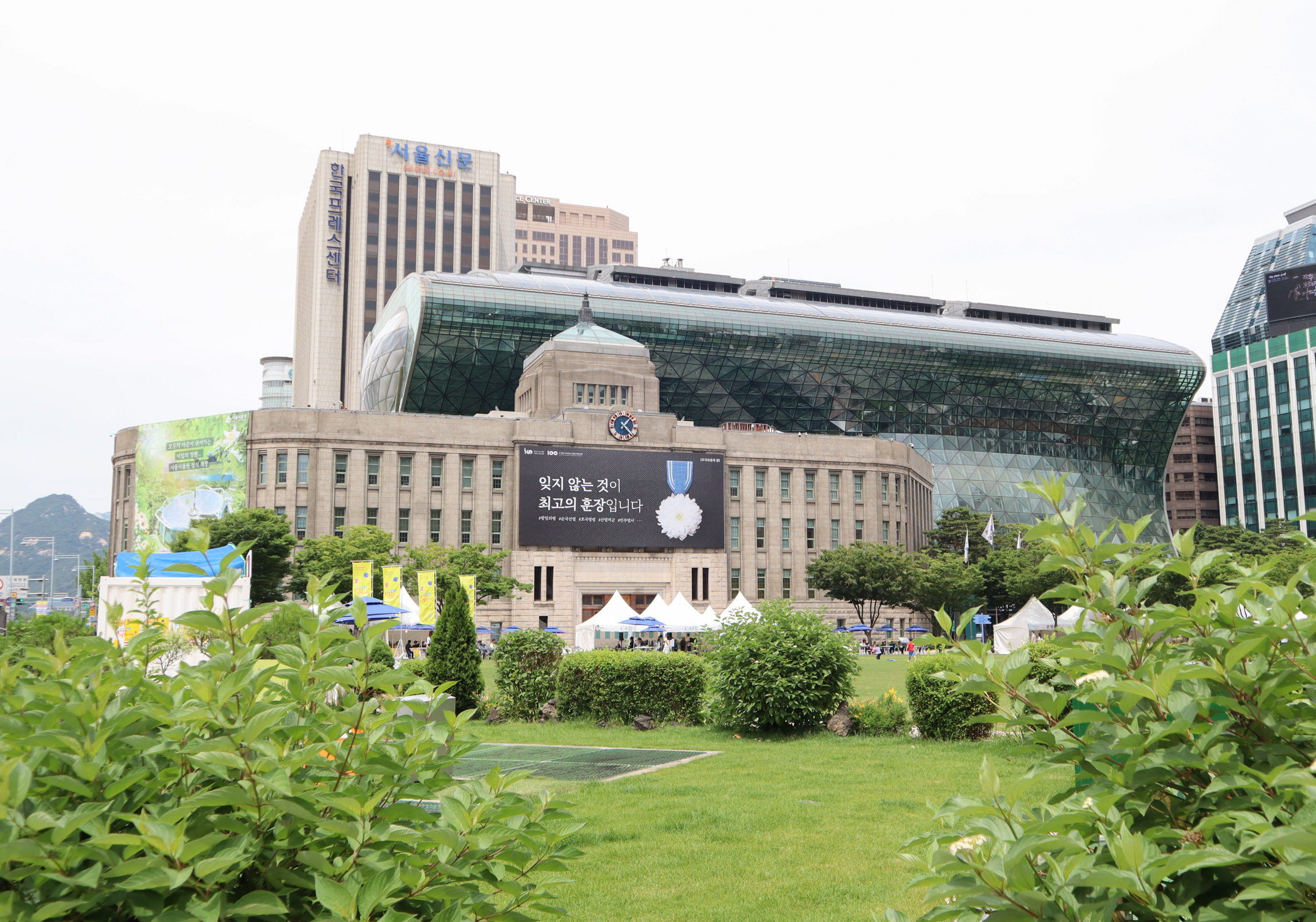
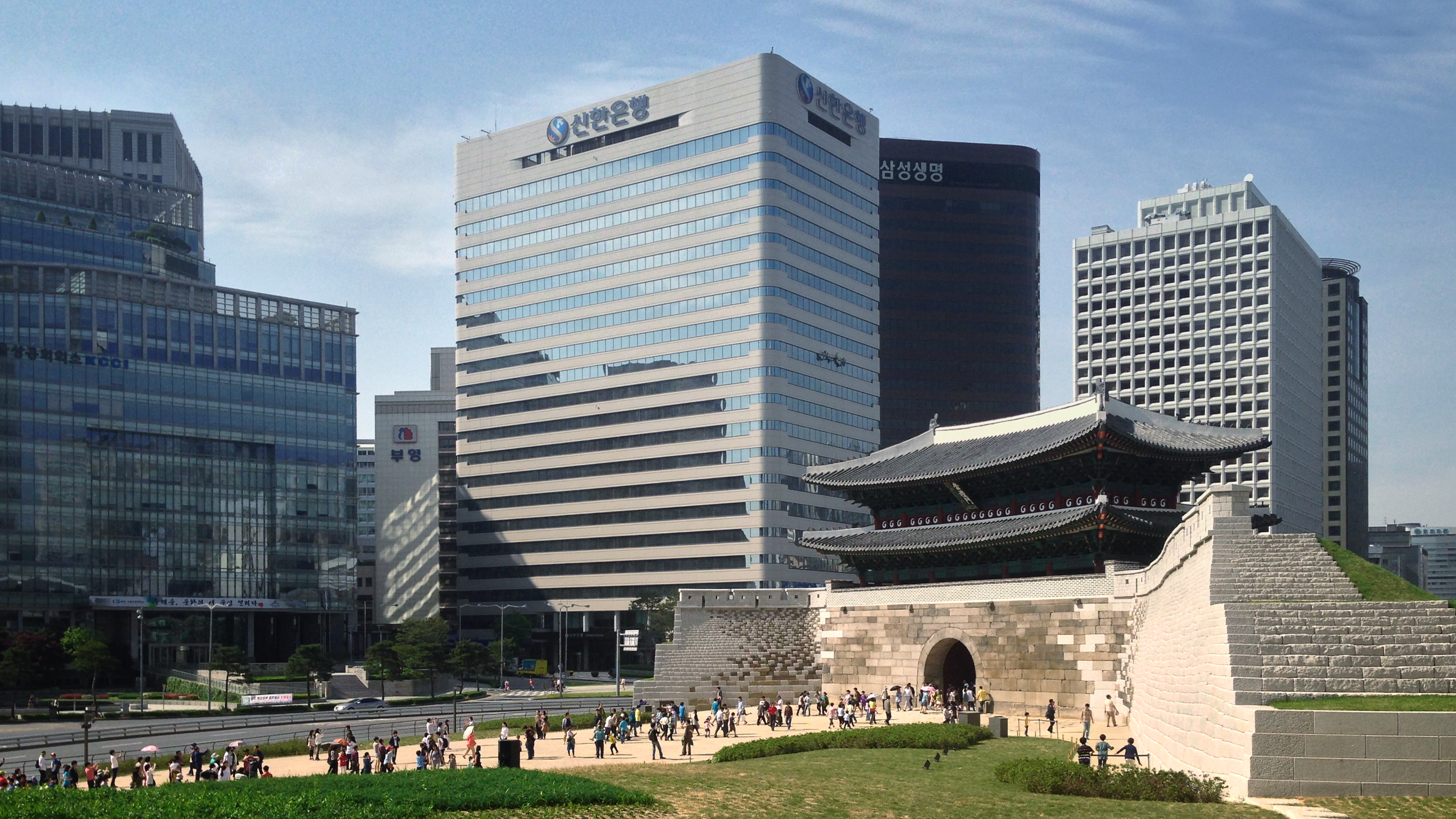
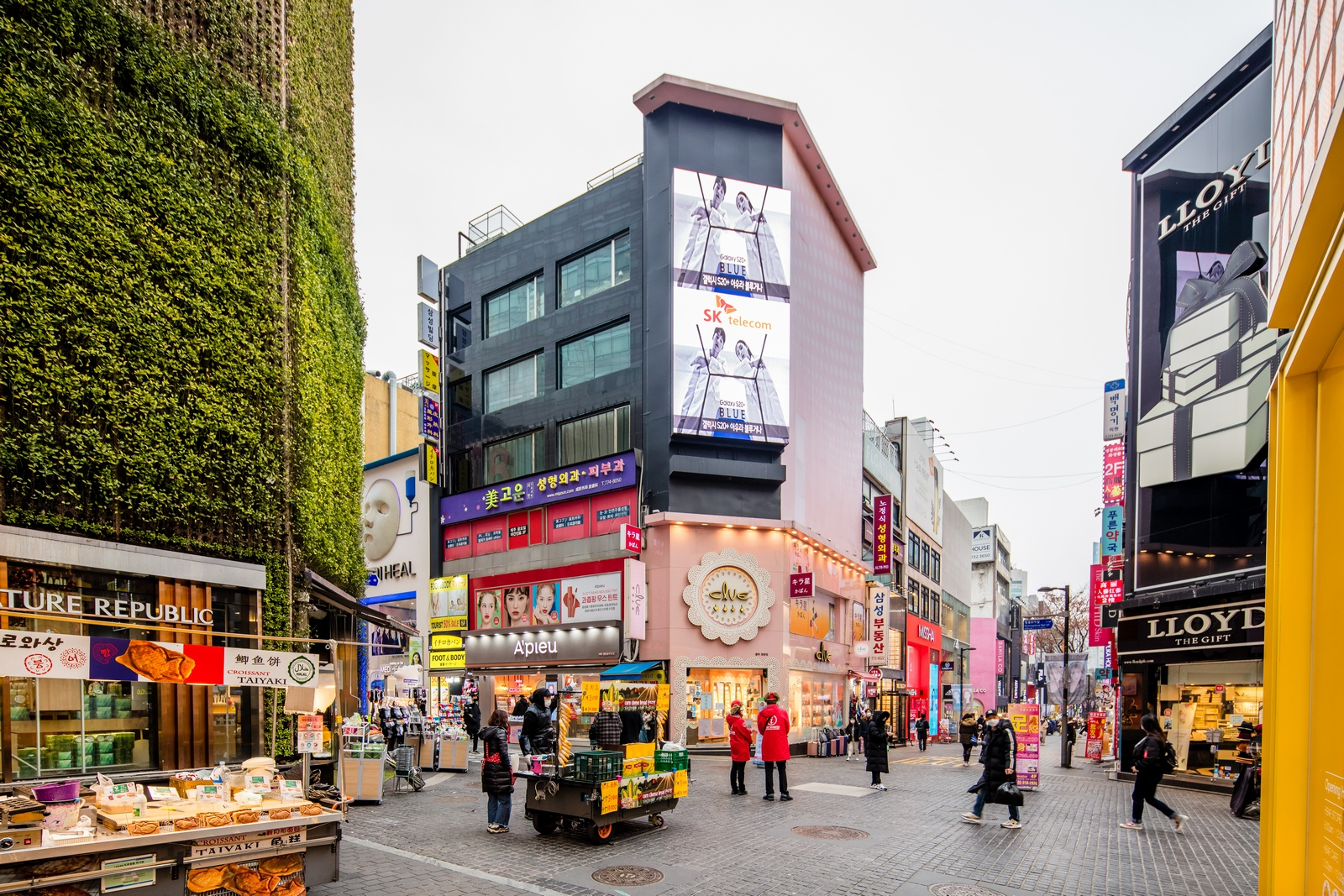
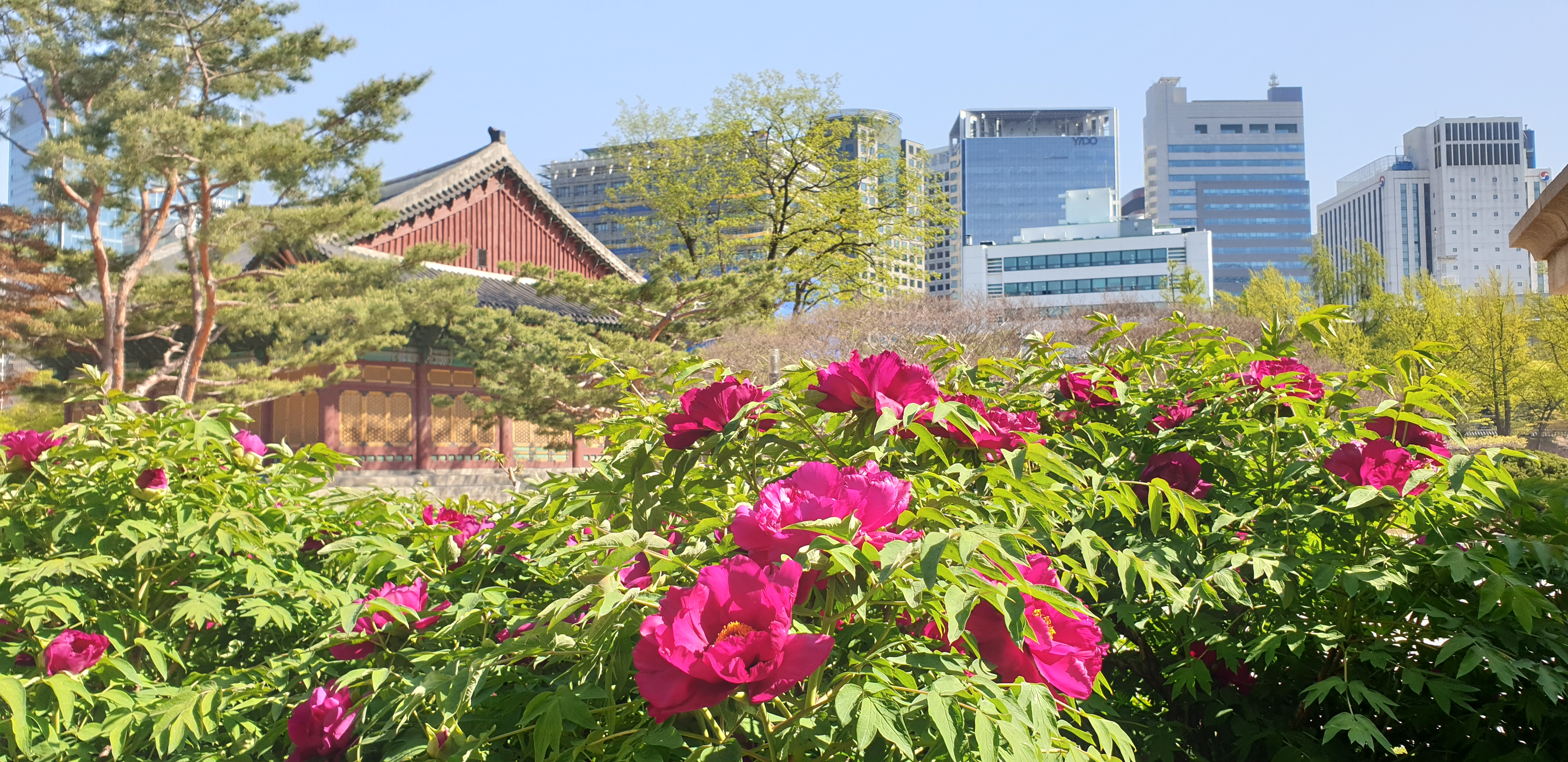
- Namsan Tower (N Seoul Tower) Cheonggyecheon Seoul City Hall Namdaemun Myeong-dong Deoksugung

- Flag

- Location of Jung-gu in Seoul
- Interactive map of Jung District
- Coordinates: 37.556°N 126.970°E
- Country: South Korea
- Region: Sudogwon
- Special City: Seoul
- Administrative dong: 15

Government
  - Body: Jung-gu Council
  - Mayor: Kim Kil-sung (People Power)
  - MNA: Park Sung-joon (Democratic)

Area
  - Total: 9.96 km^{2} (3.85 sq mi)

Population (September 2024)
  - Total: 121,324
  - Density: 12,200/km^{2} (31,500/sq mi)
- Time zone: UTC+9 (Korea Standard Time)
- Postal code..: 04500 – 04699
- Area code(s): +82-2-2200,700
- Bird: Korean magpie
- Flower: Rose
- Tree: Korean red pine
- Website: Jung-gu official website

Korean name
- Hangul: 중구
- Hanja: 中區
- RR: Jung-gu
- MR: Chung-gu

Jung District (Korean: 중구; lit. 'Central District') is one of the 25 districts of Seoul, South Korea. It has a population of 131,452 (2013) and has a geographic area 9.96 km^{2} (3.85 mi^{2}), making it both the least-populous and the smallest district of Seoul, and is divided into 15 dong (administrative neighborhoods). Jung is located at the centre of Seoul on the northern side of the Han River, bordering the city districts of Jongno to the north, Seodaemun to the northwest, Mapo to the west, Yongsan to the south, Seongdong to the southeast, and Dongdaemun to the northeast.

Jung is the historical city center of Seoul with a variety of old and new, including modern facilities such as high rise office buildings, department stores and shopping malls clustered together, and also a center of tradition where historic sites such as Deoksugung and Namdaemun can be found. Jung is home to cultural sites such as the landmark N Seoul Tower on Namsan, the Myeongdong Cathedral, the Bank of Korea Museum, and the Gwangtonggwan, the oldest continuously-operating bank building in Korea and one of city's protected monuments since March 5, 2001. The Myeongdong neighborhood is one of the most famous shopping areas and popular tourist destinations in South Korea. The district has undergone significant redevelopment in the recent decades, especially with the remodeling of Seoul Plaza and the opening up of Cheonggyecheon, previously covered by an elevated highway.

== Administrative divisions ==
Administrative divisions

Neighborhood	Hangul	Hanja
Cheonggu-dong	청구동	靑丘洞
Dasan-dong	다산동	茶山洞
Donghwa-dong	동화동	東化洞
Euljiro-dong	을지로동	乙支路洞
Gwanghui-dong	광희동	光熙洞
Hoehyeon-dong	회현동	會賢洞
Hwanghak-dong	황학동	黃鶴洞
Jangchung-dong	장충동	奬忠洞
Jungnim-dong	중림동	中林洞
Myeong-dong	명동	明洞
Pil-dong	필동	筆洞
Sindang-dong	신당동	新堂洞
Sindang 5-dong	신당제5동	新堂第5洞
Sogong-dong	소공동	小公洞
Yaksu-dong	약수동	藥水洞

== Economy ==
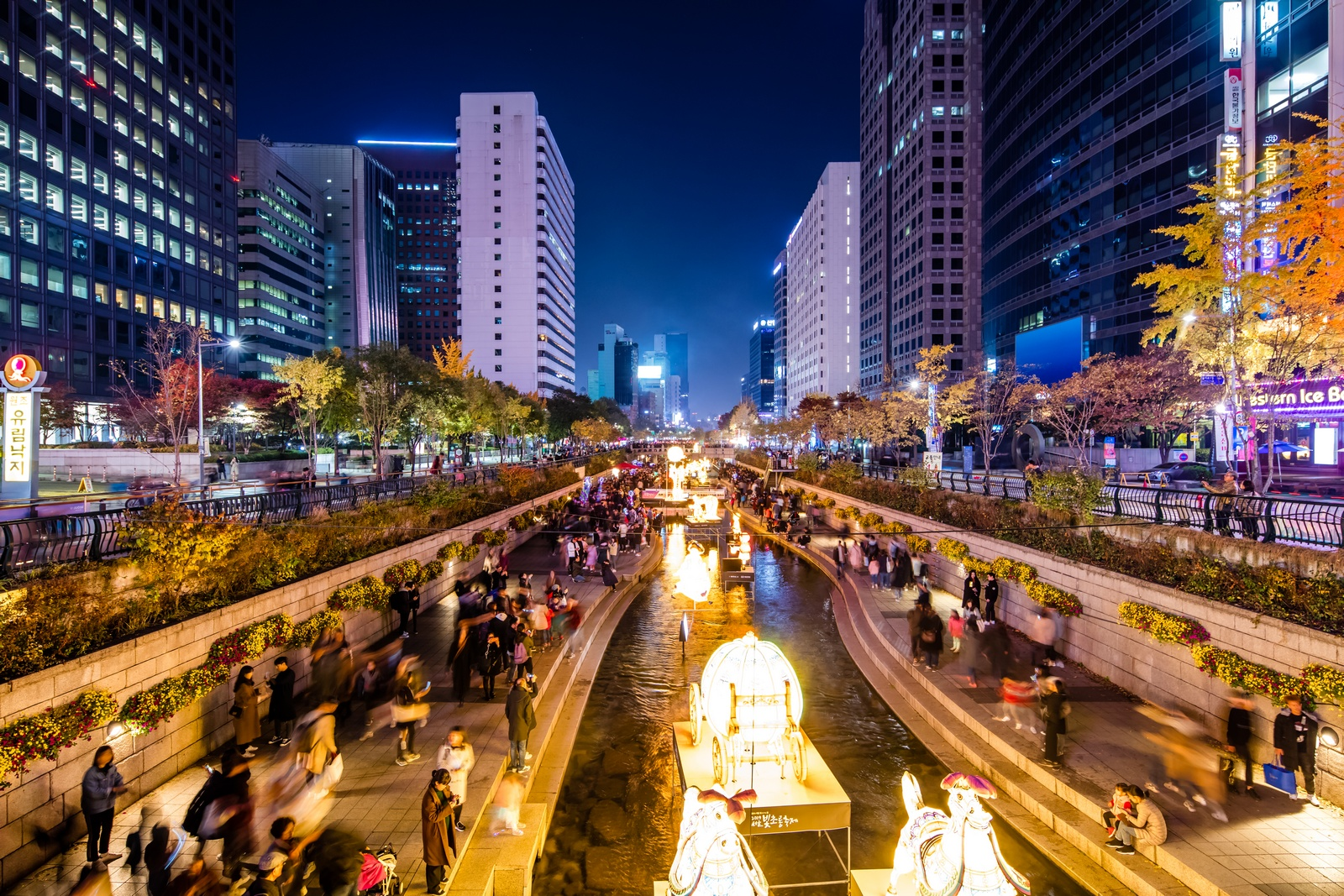
Cheonggyecheon, 2019

Jung District is one of the most significant business cores of Seoul with many companies being based around Sejong-daero or Eulji-ro. Notable companies based in Jung District include Hanhwa, Shinsegae, Hanjin, Doosan Corporation, SK Telecom, LG U+, Daewoo International, Daehan Logistics, Ssangyong Cement, Daewoo Shipbuilding & Marine Engineering, Lotte Shopping and many more. Also, many banking and other financial companies have headquarters in Jung District, such as KB Financial Group, Woori Financial Group, Shinhan Financial Group, Hana Financial Group, Korea Life Insurance, Samsung Life Insurance, Industrial Bank of Korea, Korean Exchange Bank, Samsung Card. Major newspapers such as The Chosun Ilbo and JoongAng Ilbo, The Dong-A Ilbo are also based in Jung District.

The headquarters of South Korean food company CJ Cheil Jedang is in the CJ Cheiljedang Building in Ssangnim-dong, near the Dongdaemun History & Culture Park Station.

=== Tourism ===
Jung-Gu contains numerous popular tourist spots, both modern historical & modern. These include Deoksugung, Cheonggyecheon, Seoul Plaza, Namsan Tower, Dongdaemun Design Plaza, the Myeongdong Cathedral, the Bank of Korea Museum and the popular shopping district of Myeongdong. To support tourists visiting the district there are tour buses which operate from Sejong-daero and the Seoul Metropolitan Government provide tourist support services.

Jung District also hosts several major duty free stores, including Shilla, Shinsegae & Lotte. These, along with Myeongdong, constitute the busiest tourist shopping area in the city.

One of the most recent tourist developments in the district in Seoullo 7017. The development, also known as the Seoul Skygarden or Skypark, is an elevated, linear park built atop a former highway overpass connecting the western and eastern sides of Seoul Station. The development was modeled on the High Line in New York City.

Air France operates a ticketing office on the 11th floor of the Korean Air Building in Jung District. Air China has an office on the 1st and 2nd floors of the Hansuang Building in Seosomun-dong in Jung District. All Nippon Airways operates the Seoul Office in Room 1501 on the 15th floor of the Center Building in Sogong-dong, Jung District. Hainan Airlines operates its South Korea office in Suite 1501 of the Samyoung Building in Sogong-dong. MIAT Mongolian Airlines has its Seoul Branch Office in the Soonhwa Building in Sunhwa-dong.

=== Former operations ===
In the 1980s Korean Air had its headquarters in Jung District. Its current headquarters are located in Gonghang-dong, Gangseo-gu.

== Transport ==
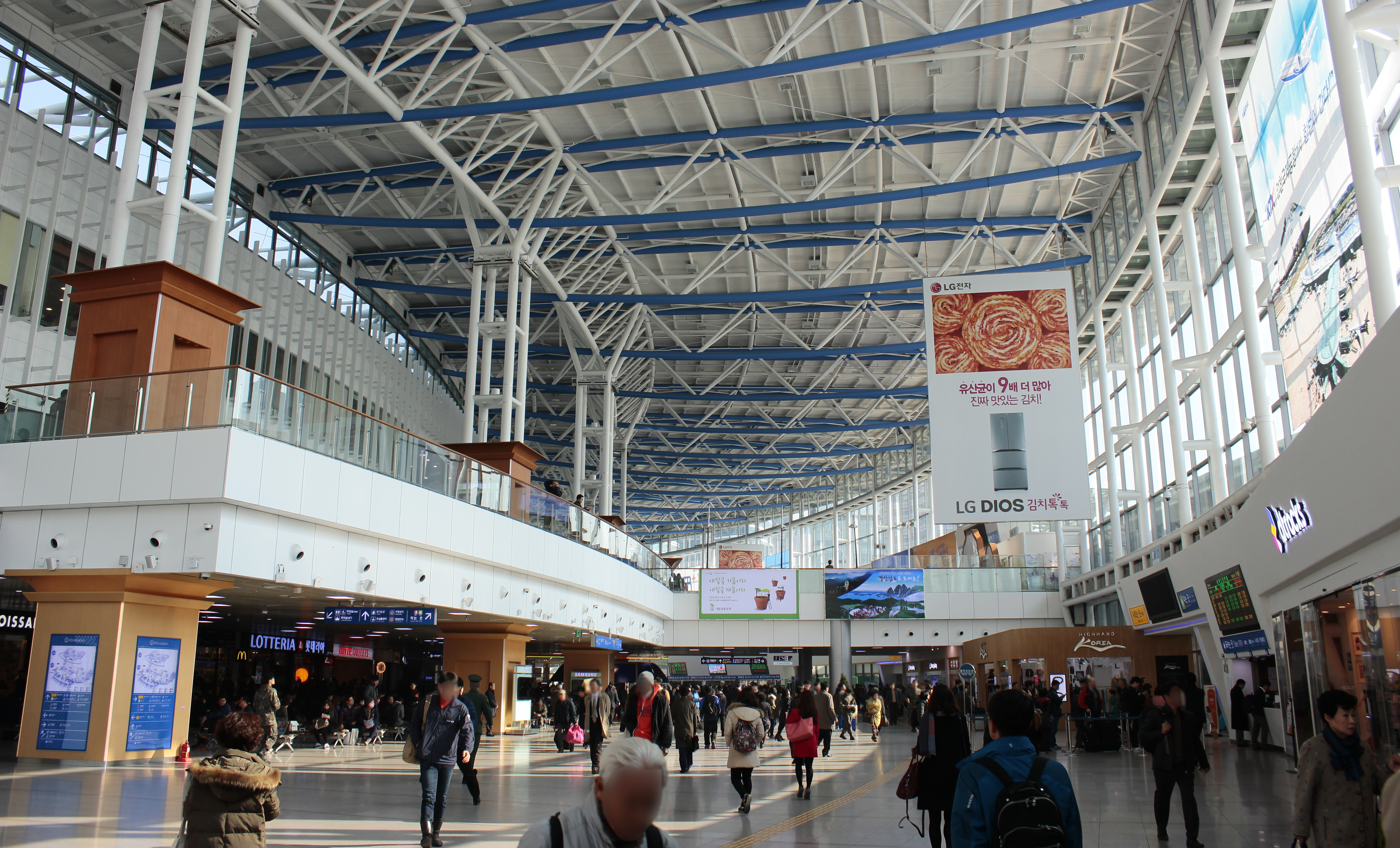
Seoul Station concourse

=== Rail and Metro ===
Being the central district of the city, Jung District is connected to numerous subway lines and shares Seoul Station with Yongsan District (the station straddles the border between the two districts). Seoul Station is served by intercity rail services run by KORAIL (KTX, ITX, Mugunghwa & tourist services) as well as AREX Airport Railroad services. Seoul Station is also served by Lines 1 and 4 of the Seoul Metro. the station also features a large multi-lane bus station immediately adjacent to the eastern (main) entrance.

=== Buses ===
Aside from Seoul station, the district is well served by both buses and subway lines. Lines 1, 2, 3, 4, 5 and 6 all run through the district. Local (green), city (blue) and express (red) buses operate throughout the district.

== Government ==
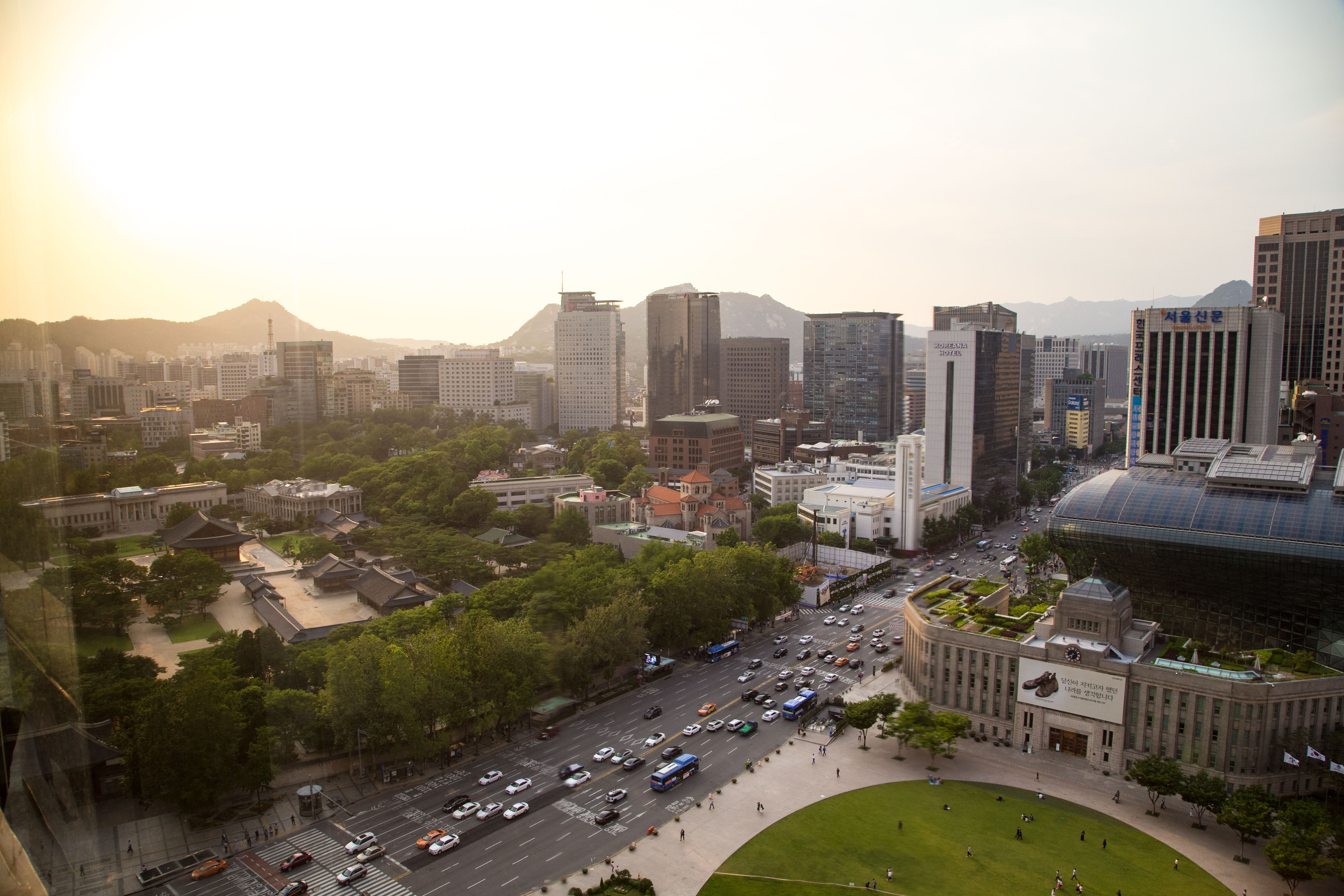
Seoul Plaza, Deoksugung, Seoul Anglican Cathedral and the British Embassy.

Seoul City Hall is located within Jung District. The current building, which was opened in 2012, sits beside the former building, which is now home to Seoul Metropolitan Library. The National Human Rights Commission of Korea has its headquarters in the Gumsegi Building in Jung District.

The Korean Maritime Safety Tribunal (KMST) formerly had its headquarters in the S1 Building in Sunhwa-dong, Jung District. The offices of the KMST are now in Sejong City.

== Diplomatic missions ==
Being at the center of the city, the district hosts numerous foreign embassies.

- Bolivia
- Cambodia
- Canada
- Chile
- China
- Costa Rica
- Croatia
- Denmark
- Dominican Republic
- El Salvador
- Estonia
- France
- Germany
- Greece
- Guatemala
- Ivory Coast
- Lithuania
- Netherlands
- New Zealand
- Nicaragua
- Norway
- Paraguay
- Peru
- Russia
- Senegal
- Serbia
- Singapore
- Sri Lanka
- Sweden
- Turkey
- United Kingdom
- Uruguay

== Education ==
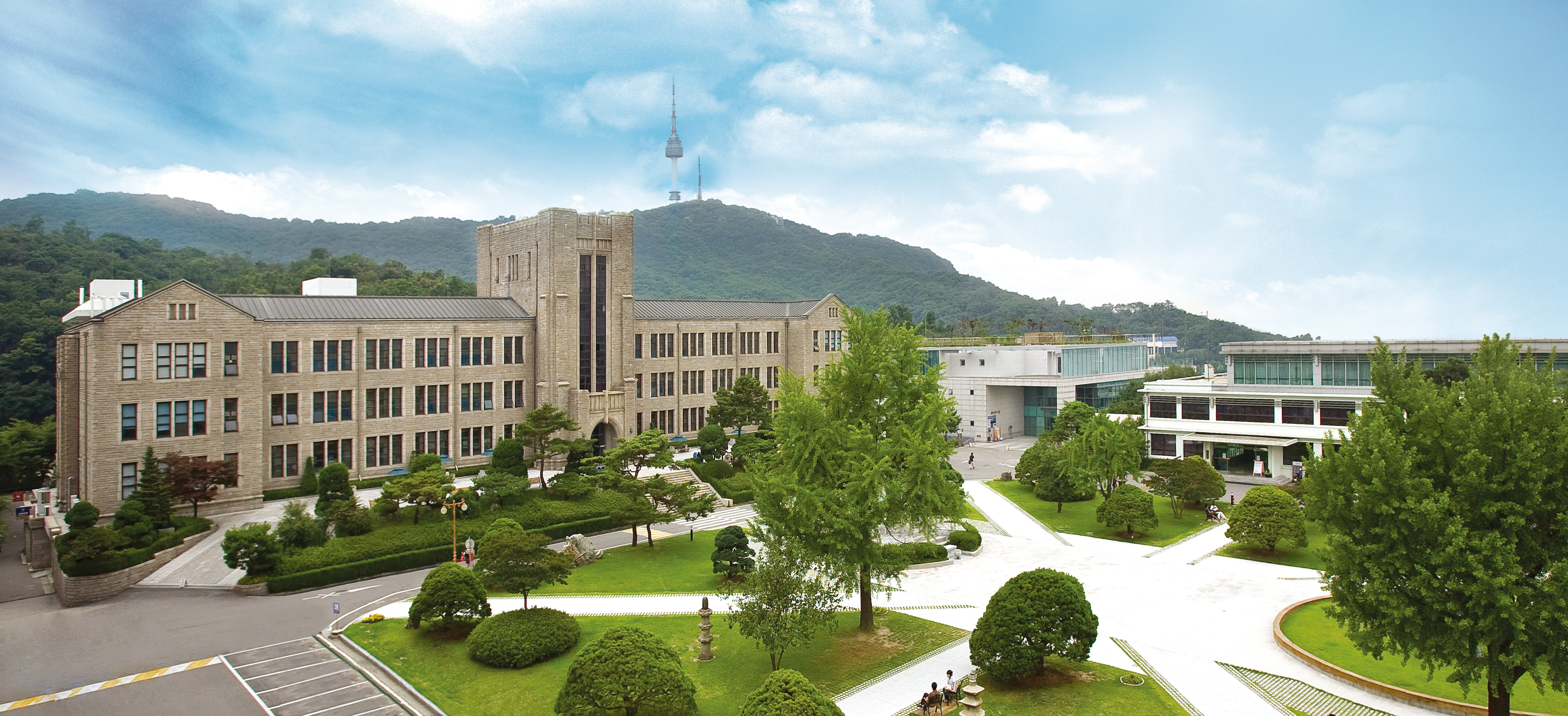
Dongguk University

=== Tertiary education ===
Dongguk University, a private university established in 1906, is located in Jung District. The University achieved full university status in 1953 and is one of the few Buddhist-affiliated universities in the world.

=== Primary & Secondary Education ===
The Russian Embassy School in Seoul was established on May 31, 2002 and operates as part of the Russian Ministry of Foreign Affairs. Seoul Chinese Primary School (also known as Hanxiao Chinese Primary School), a Taiwanese-oriented international primary school, is located in Myeong-dong.

== Symbol ==
- Color: Green
- Tree: Pine tree
- Flower: Rose
- Bird: Korean magpie

== Historic figures ==
Jung District has long been considered the center of Seoul. As a result, historically it was considered a fitting place for many scholars who stayed in Seoul to discuss and pursue crucial academic or political subjects during the Joseon period.

- Han Myŏnghoe: A scholar and tactician in the early Joseon Dynasty
- Namgung Uk: Activist for the Korean independence movement

== Landmarks ==
- Deoksugung
- Namdaemun
- Bank of Korea Museum
- Global Village Folk Museum
- Grand Ambassador Seoul hotel
- Gwangtonggwan
- Koreana Hotel (Seoul)
- National Theater of Korea
- Seoul Museum of Art
- Myeongdong Cathedral
- N Seoul Tower
- Namsan
- Chungmu Arts Hall
- Lotte Hotel Seoul
- Tour Financial Hub Center

== Sister cities ==
- Parramatta, New South Wales, Australia
- Hunchun, People's Republic of China
- Xicheng District, People's Republic of China
