= Jeongja-dong, Suwon =

Coordinates: 37°16′46″N 126°59′41″E

Jeongja-dong
- Interactive map of Jeongja-dong
- Country: South Korea
- Region: Sudogwon
- Administrative divisions: Jeongja-1-dong, Jeongja-2-dong, Jeongja-3-dong

Area
  - Total: 4.37 km^{2} (1.69 sq mi)

Population (2014)
  - Total: 117,194
  - Density: 26,818/km^{2} (69,460/sq mi)
- Dialect: Seoul

Korean name
- Hangul: 정자동
- Hanja: 亭子洞
- RR: Jeongja-dong
- MR: Chŏngja-dong

Jeongja-dong (Korean: 정자동) is a group of three administrative neighbourhoods of Jangan-gu, Suwon, Gyeonggi Province, South Korea. Jeongja-dong is also a legal status neighbourhood, though the administrative neighbourhoods' boundaries are wider. The three administrative neighbourhoods comprising Jeongja-dong are Jeongja-1-dong, Jeongja-2-dong, and Jeongja-3-dong. Jeongja-3-dong incorporates part of the legal status neighbourhood Cheoncheon-dong. Jeongja-dong is in central Jangan-gu, though it shares a short border with the city of Uiwang.

== History ==
Jeongja (정자/亭子) means pavilion, and it is thought that the name comes from local pavilions such as Yeongyeongjeong (영영정/迎華亭) (also known as Gyogujeong [교구정/交龜亭]). Jeongja-dong was originally in Ilyong-myeon, Gwangju-bu (광주부 일용면), and was incorporated into Suwon-bu (수원부) in 1789 as Jeongja-ri (亭子里) according to the Suwon Gazette (Suwon-gun Eupji), published in 1899.

On April 1, 1914, when the colonial Japanese changed locales' names and administrative districts, so Jinmok-dong and Cheoncheon-dong were grouped and renamed Cheoncheon-ri, and then fell under the jurisdiction of Ilhyeong-myeon. On October 1, 1936, Ilhyeong-myeon and Uiwang-myeon were merged into Ilwang-myeon, and Cheoncheon-ri became Jeongjeong-ri.

On the fourth anniversary of liberation, August 15, 1949, when the Suwon-eup area was promoted to Suwon-bu (Suwon City), the area was reorganised as Jeongja-ri, Ilwang-myeon, Hwaseong-gun. On January 1, 1963, by Law No. 1175, the area was incorporated into Suwon City from Ilwang-myeon, Hwaseong-gun. It then fell under the jurisdiction of Pajeong-dong, along with Pajeong-ri, Imok-ri, and Yuljeon-ri. According to Suwon City Ordinance No. 1139, on October 1, 1983, Pajeong-dong was then separated into Pajeong-dong and Jeongja-dong. On January 1, 1990, according to Suwon City Ordinance No. 1607, Jeongja-dong was divided into Jeongja 1-dong and Jeongja 2-dong. On December 31, 1997, when apartments were built in the area, the population surged, and on February 10, 2003, Jeongja 3-dong separated from Jeongja 1-dong.

In 1987, SKC opened a chemical factory in Jeongja-1-dong. This has contributed significantly to Suwon's tax revenue. The area is today, however, becoming more residential, and the factory is the cause of the greatest number of complaints from Suwon residents.

== Geography ==
The Seohocheon stream flows SSE through Jeongja-dong. Its source is on the south west slopes below Gwanggyo Helipad on the nearby mountain Gwanggyosan, and this stream joins the Hwanggujicheon further south, by Suwon Air Base. The Seohocheon is joined in Jeongja-dong by the Jeongjacheon (also sometimes known as the Yeonghwacheon), which flows SSW from Ilwang Reservoir in Manseok Park.

== Industry ==
Jeongja-dong contains an SKC chemical plant producing window film. The plant was reduced in size to create the 3,498-unit 117.7m-tall SK Sky View apartment complex, which opened in 2013.

== Education ==
Jeongja-dong has nine elementary schools: Cheoncheon, Cheonil, Daepyeong, Dasol, Dongsin, Hyocheon, Jeongja, Myeongin, and Songnim. There are three middle schools: Cheoncheon, Daepyeong and Myeongin. Cheoncheon, Daepyeong, Gyeonggi Sports High School, Suseong, Jangan, and Yeongsaeng High Schools are also in Jeongja-dong, as is Dongnam Health University.

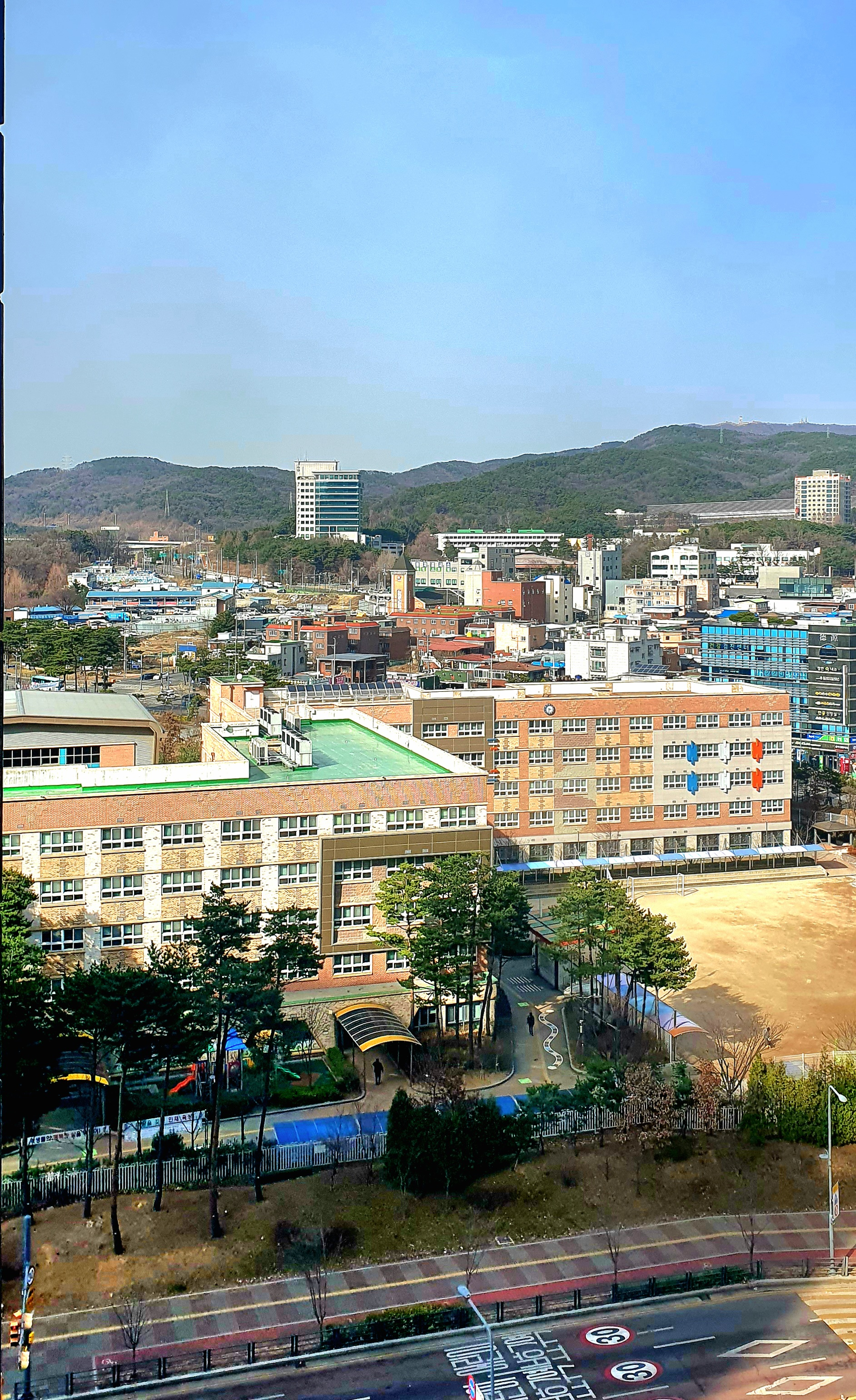
Dasol Elementary School

== Housing ==
As is typical of urban South Korea, Suwon has many apartment complexes. The city has been affected greatly by real estate price fluctuations.

== Facilities ==
Jeongja-dong has a major sports centre—Life Sports—with multiple swimming pools, a gym, and other leisure facilities, e.g., a sauna. There are also a trampoline centre (Jumping Park) and a roller skating centre (Roller Park), both for children.

The 1250-seat performing arts centre Suwon SK Artrium opened in 2014 beside SK Sky View Apartments in northern Jeongja-1-dong.

Starfield, a large entertainment, dining, and shopping mall, is under construction in southern Jeongja-2-dong, and is expected to open by early 2024. Other shopping facilities are centred around two main parts of Jeongja-3-dong: near the fire station, and by the railway between Sungkyunkwan University and Hwaseo stations, where there is a branch of Lotte Mart.

Suwon Central Police Station, Suwon Fire Station, and the main Suwon Post Office are all in Jeongja-3-dong.

== Transport ==
=== Rail ===
The Gyeongbu Railway Line passes briefly through Jeongja-dong between Sungkyunkwan University and Hwaseo stations on Seoul Subway Line 1, though there are no stations actually in Jeongja-dong. Since several Korean cities have a Jeongja-dong, some confusion can arise, especially regarding transport. Travellers should thus be aware that Jeongja station is in Jeongja-dong in the nearby city of Seongnam, not in Suwon.

=== Road ===
No major roads pass through the area, but National Route 1 lies just outside its boundaries, and the North Suwon Interchange on the Yeongdong Expressway is nearby.

== Religion ==
The Roman Catholic diocese of Suwon, incorporating much of southern Gyeonggi Province, was established on October 7, 1963. Its headquarters are in Jeongja-dong at 39 Imok-ro.
