= Ipbuk-dong =

Coordinates: 37°17′36″N 126°57′35″E

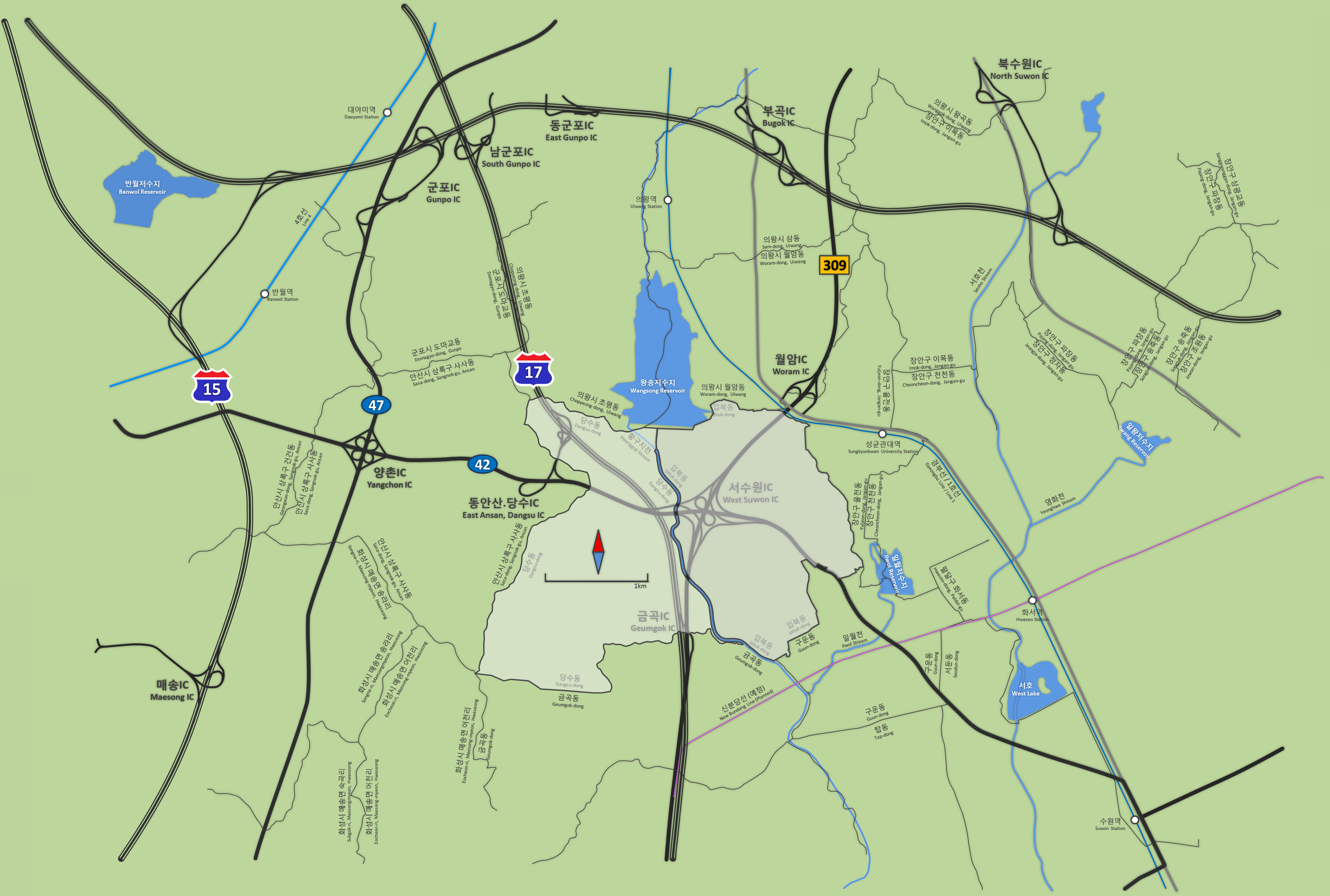
- Map of Ipbuk-dong
- Country: South Korea
- Region: Sudogwon
- Administrative divisions: Ipbuk-dong, Dangsu-dong

Government
  - Mayor: Lee Wonbok

Area
  - Total: 7.08 km^{2} (2.73 sq mi)

Population (2019)
  - Total: 17,435
  - Density: 2,463/km^{2} (6,380/sq mi)
- Dialect: Seoul

Korean name
- Hangul: 입북동
- Hanja: 笠北洞
- RR: Ipbuk-dong
- MR: Ippuk-tong

Ipbuk-dong (Korean: 입북동) is an administrative neighbourhood in Gwonseon-gu, Suwon, Gyeonggi Province, South Korea. Ipbuk-dong is divided into two different legal-status neighbourhoods, namely Ipbuk-dong (same name) and Dangsu-dong (당수동; 堂樹洞), which are separated by the Hwanggujicheon—a stream which flows south from Wangsong Reservoir on their northern boundary with the city of Uiwang, through Suwon, eventually to Asan Bay. Dangsu-dong has Suwon's sole boundary with Ansan, and meets Hwaseong further south. The neighbourhood is 96% green belt.

== History ==
Ipbuk-dong's history can be traced to the Joseon Dynasty, at which time it was administered as part of Wolgok-myeon, Gwangju-gun (광주군 월곡면). By 1895, "Ipbuk-ri" had been listed as a village, and on 1 April 1914 both Dangsu-ri and Ipbuk-ri were listed as villages in Suwon-gun. However, they by now belonged to different administrative districts, the Hwanggujicheon dividing Wolgokmyeon to the west from Banwol-myeon (반월면) to the east. On 15 August 1949, Wolgok-myeon was incorporated into Banwol-myeon, but under the jurisdiction of Hwaseong-gun (화성군), and on 26 December 1994 they became part of Gwonseon-gu, Suwon-si, namely as Ipbuk-dong and Dangsu-ri. In 2012, the part of Wangsong Reservoir in Ipbuk-dong was transferred to Uiwang City as part of a land exchange.

== Geography ==
Ipbuk-dong lies to the south of Wangsong Reservoir, and is divided into Ipbuk-dong (same name) and Dangsu-dong by the Hwanggujicheon, which is crossed by nine bridges within the dong's limits (four of which, including Dangsu Bridge, form part of Seosuwon Interchange) and a further bridge immediately to the north at the western end of Wangsong Dam. The highest point in the neighbourhood is over 160m above sea level, at the northern end of Chilbosan, where Dangsu-dong meets the city of Ansan to the west.

Ipbuk-dong is on the flight path from Suwon Air Base.

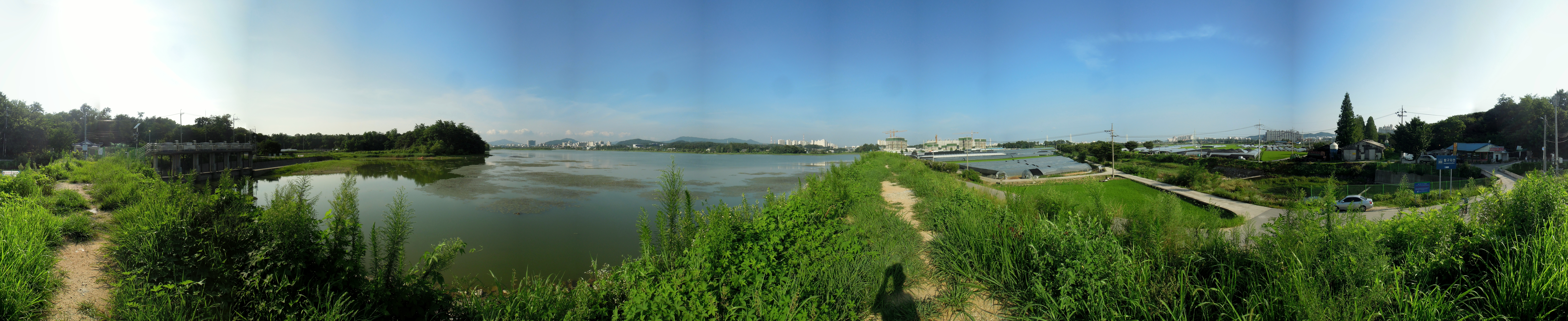
Wangsong Reservoir, Ipbuk-dong, the Hwanggujicheon and Dangsu-dong - 360° Panorama prior to construction of Uiwang Railbike

== Administration ==
Ipbuk-dong is administered from the Community Centre at 17 Ipbuk-ro. The head of the dong office (2019) is Lee Wonbok (이원복).

== Demographics ==
There are 17435 residents in Ipbuk-dong (2019), 99 (0.6%) of whom hold foreign nationality. A small majority of the Korean population (8746) are male (8590 female). There are 6119 households, with on average 2.9 people. There was a 25% population increase between 2011 and 2014, largely due to the opening of Prugio Apartments.

== Education ==
Ipbuk-dong has three public schools:

=== Ipbuk Elementary School ===
Established in 2004 in Ipbuk-dong proper, Ipbuk Elementary School caters to 616 children, with a further 64 in the kindergarten. The head of the school is Kim Gwangsu (김광수), and there are 57 members of staff in total.
Address: 10 Yuljeon-ro, Gwonseon-gu, Suwon, Gyeonggi-do

=== Dangsu Elementary School (Dangsu-dong) ===
Situated in Dangsu-dong, Dangsu Elementary School opened on 1 March 1969, and is therefore the oldest school in Ipbuk-dong. It is also the largest, catering to 1083 children, 27 more of whom are in the kindergarten class. The current head of the school is Lee Yonggil, and there are 66 members of staff.
Address: 6 Dangjin-ro, Gwonseon-gu, Suwon, Gyeonggi-do

=== Gyeonggi Daemyeong High School ===
Established in 2002 to the north of Road 42 in Dangsu-dong, Gyeonggi Daemyeong High School is an alternative school. The school has 78 male and 21 female students. The current head is Oh Cheolhyeon (오철현), and there are 33 staff on site.
Address: 3-24 Suin-ro 598-beon-gil, Gwonseon-gu, Suwon, Gyeonggi-do

== Housing ==
Though there are many individual houses and smaller units, there are also several large apartment complexes. Ipbuk-dong itself has two major complexes, while Dangsu-dong has a number of older developments. In Ipbuk-dong, Seosuwon Xii Apartments, a 41,978.30m² development with 17 15-storey buildings comprising 921 units, was completed on Feb 26, 2009, while Lakeside Prugio, a 13 30-storey building development of 1366 units at the south-east corner of Wangsong Reservoir, opened in 2014. Other residents are housed in older accommodation, primarily Ungbi Apartments.

Dangsu-dong houses several older complexes, namely Samjeong Green View (Opened Feb. 1997), Injeong Prince (Nov. 1998), Halla Vivaldi (Jan. 2005; two complexes), and Seosuwon Ssangyong Sweet Dot Home (Sep. 2005). A new housing development between this built-up area and Homaesil to the south is expected to be completed in 2021.

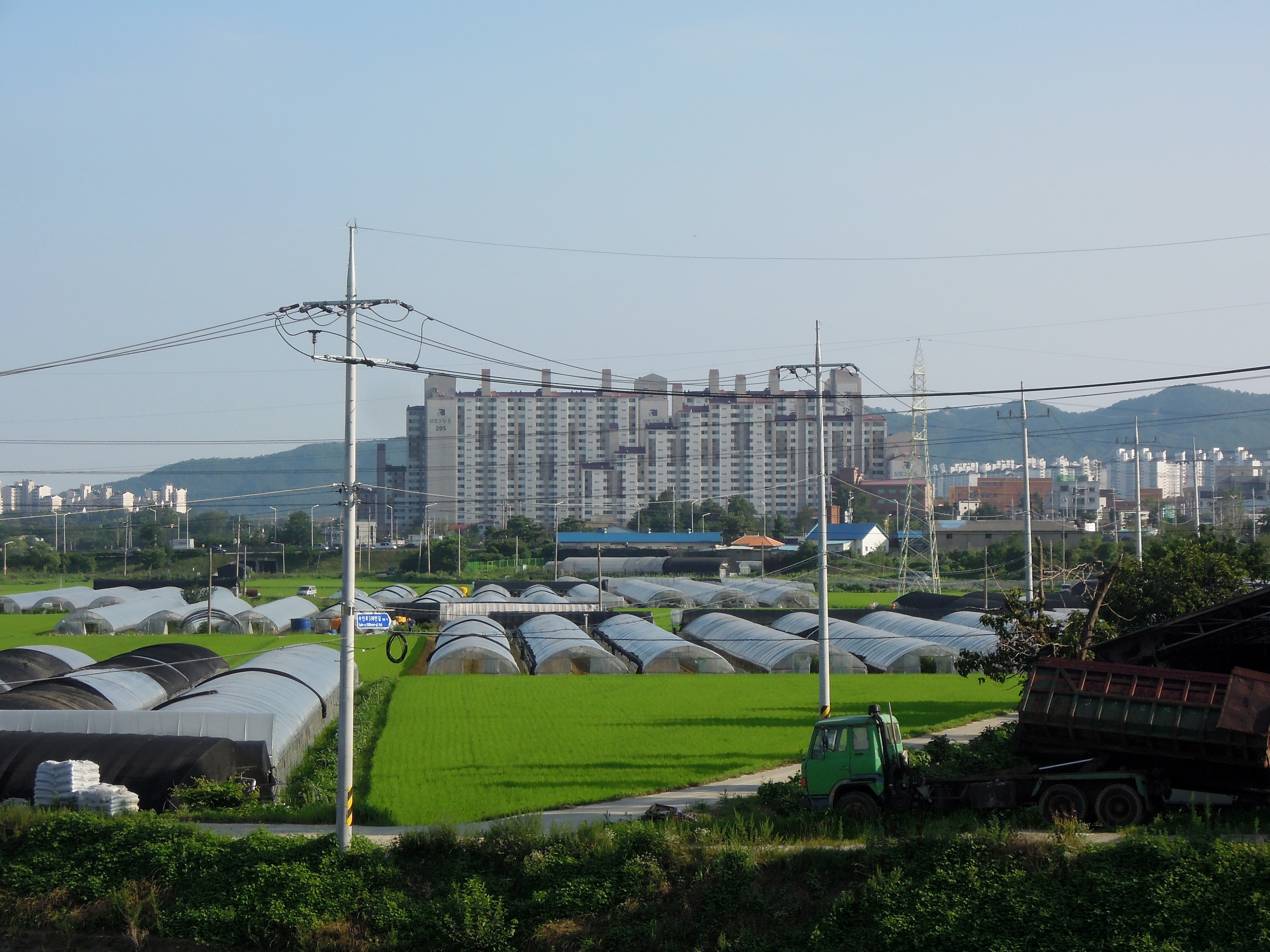
Samjeong Green View seen from Wangsong Dam

== Transportation ==
Seosuwon I.C., a major interchange, is in the heart of Ipbuk-dong. Road 42, from Ansan to Suwon, meets the Gwacheon-Bongdam highway here. The Suwon-Munsan Expressway (17) opened in 2016, with the Geumgok and East Ansan-Dangsu interchanges both partially in Dangsu-dong.

Regarding public transport, Ipbuk-dong is close to Sungkyunkwan University Station on the Seoul Subway network, while the Shinbundang Line is planned to pass to the south of the neighbourhood in 2019.

In line with government policy to increase the number of roundabouts, one was constructed from August to November 2013 to replace the traffic signals by Ipbuk Primary School, while another was constructed on the Ipbuk-ro/Ipbuk-ro-77beongil junction in 2019.

== Recreation and leisure ==
Dangsu-dong Citizens' Farm features an agricultural park.

There are a number of public footpaths, including those either side of the Hwanggujicheon, and several outdoor gyms.

== Agriculture ==
Being 96% green belt, Ipbuk-dong has a lot of farmland. Most of this takes the form of smallholdings.
