= Jowon-dong, Suwon =

Coordinates: 37°18′20″N 127°00′34″E

Jowon-dong
- Interactive map of Jowon-dong
- Country: South Korea
- Region: Sudogwon
- Administrative divisions: Jowon-1-dong, Jowon-2-dong

Area
  - Total: 3.12 km^{2} (1.20 sq mi)

Population (2011)
  - Total: 54,258
  - Density: 17,390/km^{2} (45,000/sq mi)
- Dialect: Seoul

Korean name
- Hangul: 조원동
- Hanja: 棗園洞
- RR: Jowon-dong
- MR: Chowŏn-dong

Jowon-dong (Korean: 조원동) is a dong in Jangan-gu, Suwon, Gyeonggi-do, South Korea. Divided into two "dongs", namely Jowon-1-dong and Jowon-2-dong, Jowon-dong lies in the north of the city, backing onto Gwanggyosan, a mountain to the north.

== Demographics ==
There are 54258 residents in Jowon-dong, with males and females in almost equal numbers.

== Housing ==
Though there are many individual houses and smaller units, there are also several large apartment complexes, the most notable of which is Hanil Town.

== Transportation ==
Jowon-dong is situated on Route 1, a major road stretching the length of the Korean Peninsula. An extension of the Shinbundang subway line is intended to open in the dong, with construction currently underway, as is Suwon's own proposed metro.

== See also ==
- Jangan-gu
- Suwon
