= Jungbocheon =

River in South Korea

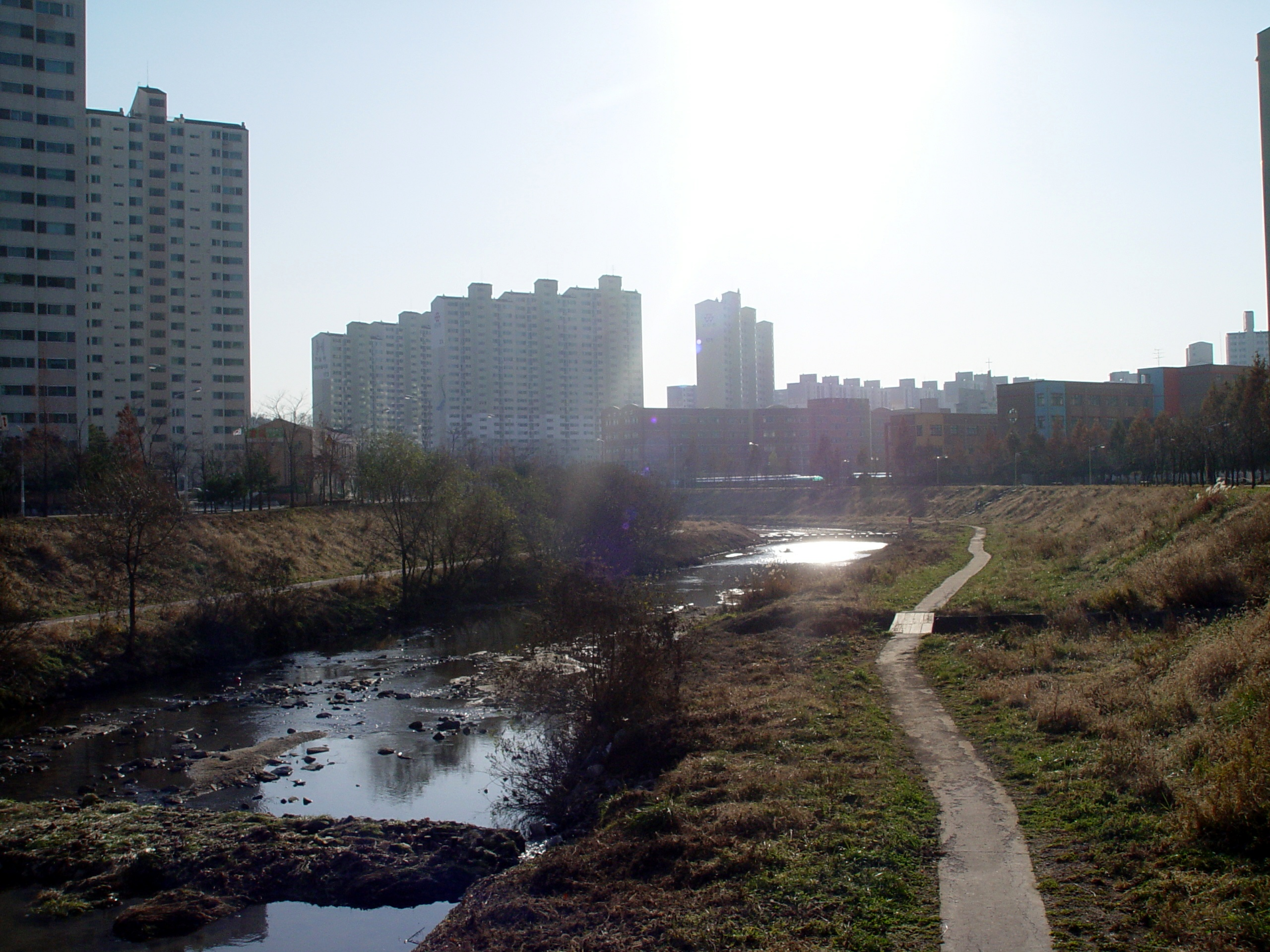
- Looking downstream in Suwon

Korean name
- Hangul: 중보천
- RR: Jungbocheon
- MR: Chungboch'ŏn

Jungbocheon (Korean: 중보천) is a stream in South Korea. It is a tributary of Hwanggujicheon, which in turn empties into the Yellow Sea at Asan Bay. Its source is Eupjang Reservoir, also known as Pajang Reservoir, near the North Suwon exit of the Yeongdong Expressway and at the bottom of the southwest slope of Gwanggyosan, on the border between Yongin and Suwon. It then flows south through the city of Suwon, being fed from the east by Ilwang Reservoir. It passes by Hwaseo station and then forms Seoho, meaning West Lake. It then passes out of urban Suwon, still flowing south, till it joins the Hwanggujicheon.

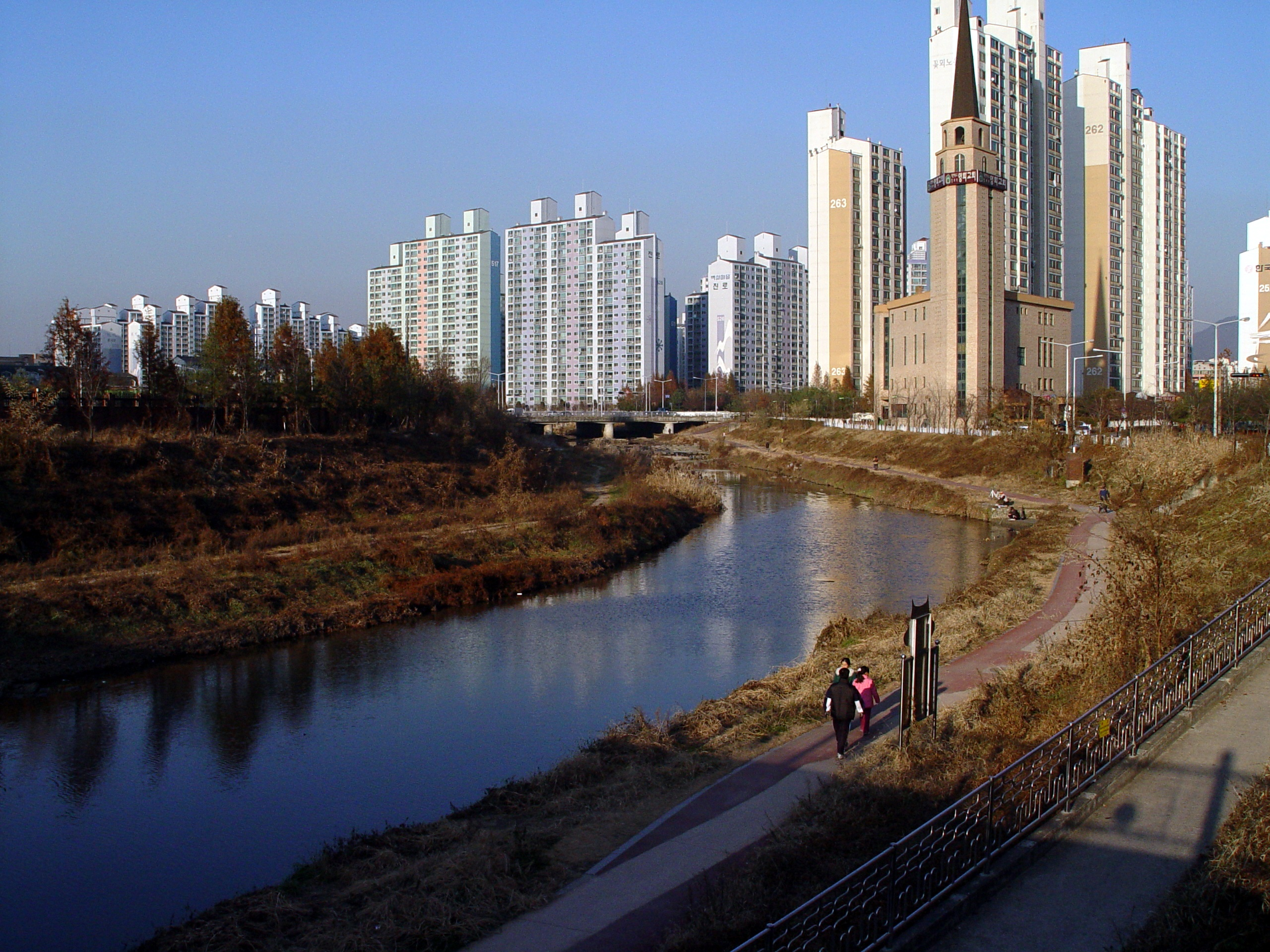
Looking upstream in Suwon

== See also ==
- Rivers of Asia
- Rivers of Korea
- Geography of South Korea
