= Seohocheon =

Seoheocheon
- Location within South Korea

Location
- Country: South Korea
- Province: Gyeonggi

Physical characteristics
- Source: Gwanggyosan
  - location: Jangan District, Suwon
  - coordinates: 37.32703°N 126.99574°E
- Mouth: Hwanggujicheon
  - location: Gwonseon District, Suwon
  - coordinates: 37.23342°N 126.98989°E
- Length: 13.65 km (8.48 mi)
- Basin size: 30.58 km^{2} (11.81 mi^{2})

Basin features
- River system: Anyangcheon

- Seohocheon
- Hangul: 서호천
- Hanja: 西湖川
- RR: Seohocheon
- MR: Sŏhoch'ŏn

The Seohocheon is a river in Suwon, South Korea. It has its source on the southern slopes of Gwanggyosan and flows south, through Cheoncheon-dong, past Dongnam Health College, to Seoho (West Lake), near Hwaseo station. From there, it continues south and joins the Hwanggujicheon. There is a path alongside much of the length of the stream and this is currently being extended north towards the source.

== Gallery ==
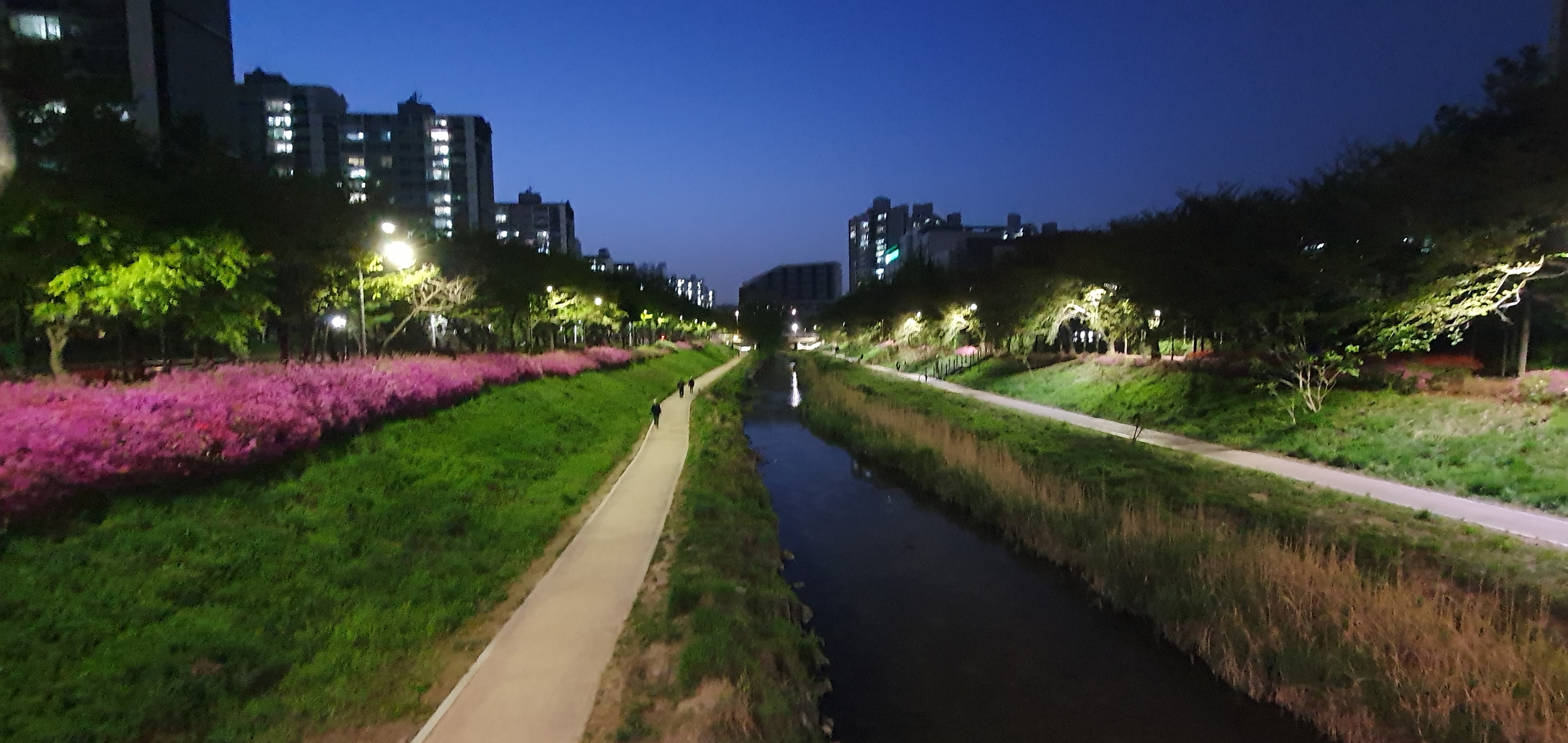
Looking upstream along the Daewol Bridge, 2023

== See also ==
- Rivers of Korea
- Geography of South Korea
