= Suwoncheon =

Watercourse in South Korea

- Hangul: 수원천
- Hanja: 水原川
- RR: Suwoncheon
- MR: Suwŏnch'ŏn

Suwoncheon (Korean: 수원천) is a stream in South Korea. It is a tributary of the Hwanggujicheon, which in turn empties into the Yellow Sea at Asan Bay. Its source is on the slopes of Gwanggyosan on the border between Yongin and Suwon, from where it forms the Gwanggyo Reservoir. It then runs south and through Hwaseong's Hwahongmun to enter the old city of Suwon. It then runs through the centre of the old town and crosses the city walls once again near Paldalmun, crossing through Namsumun, a gate which was destroyed by a flood in 1922 and rebuilt in 2012. The stream has been covered for the rest of its journey through the city centre. On reemerging it then continues in a southerly direction before joining the Hwanggujicheon.

== Flora and fauna ==
Notices alongside the upper reaches of the stream claim that it supports abundant plant life, including irises, alpine forget-me-nots, Commelina communis, and 95 species of aquatic plants. The stream is also said to support a variety of animal life, including minnows, pupfish, catfish, Pseudorasbora parva, Chinese mystery snails, and Ranatra chinensis.

== Gallery ==
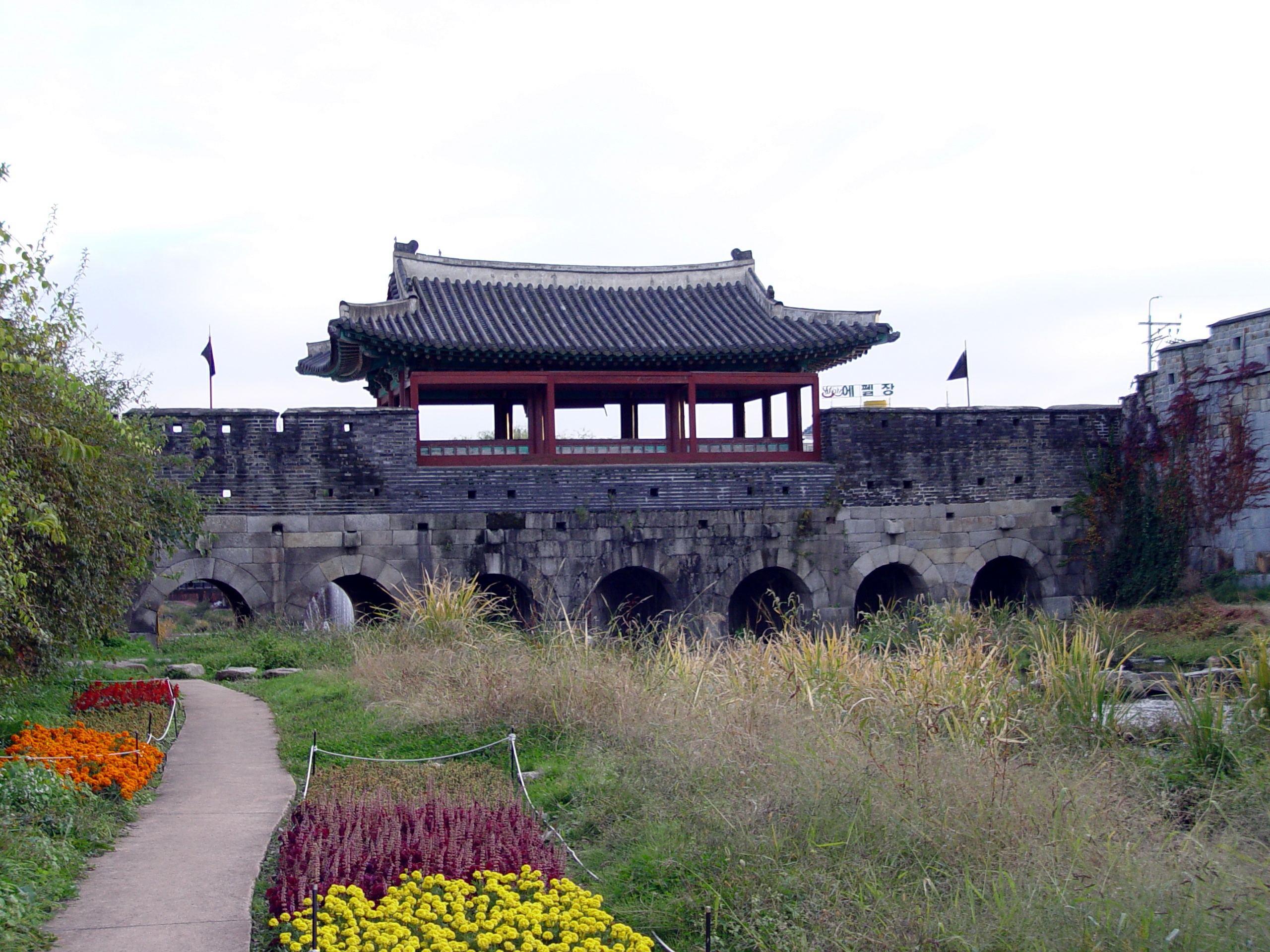
Approaching Hwahongmun

== See also ==
- Rivers of Asia
- Rivers of Korea
- Geography of South Korea
