= Jangan District =

District of Suwon, South Korea

- Non-autonomous District
- Panoramic view of Jangan District

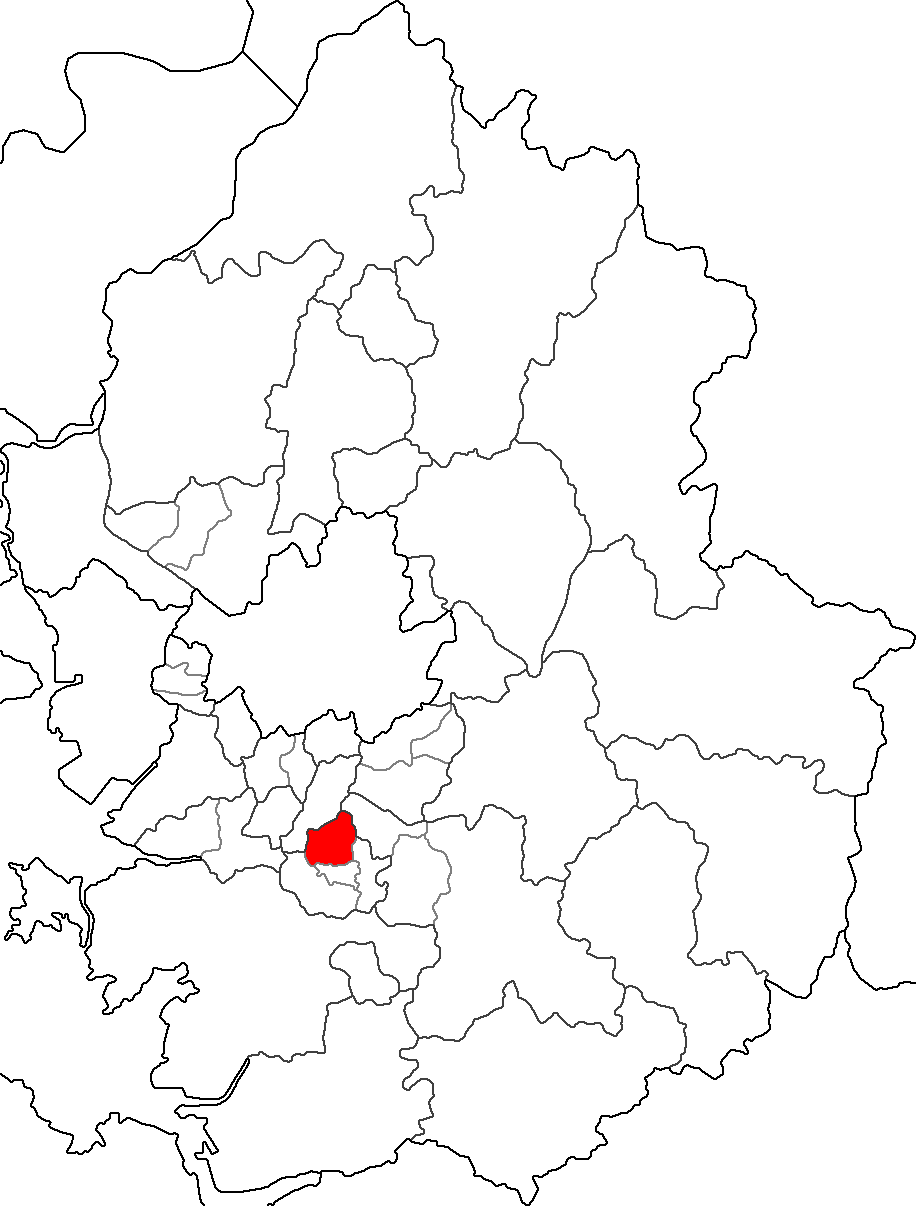
- Map of Gyeonggi highlighting Jangan District.
- Country: South Korea
- Region: Sudogwon (Gijeon)
- Province: Gyeonggi
- City: Suwon
- Administrative divisions: 10 dong

Government
  - Mayor: Lee Sang-soo (이상수)

Area
  - Total: 33.17 km^{2} (12.81 sq mi)

Population (2024)
  - Total: 274,850
  - Dialect: Seoul
- Website: Jangan-gu Office

Korean name
- Hangul: 장안구
- Hanja: 長安區
- RR: Jangan-gu
- MR: Changan-gu

Jangan District (Korean: 장안구), established on July 1, 1988, is the northern district of the city of Suwon in Gyeonggi Province, South Korea. It is approximately 15 km. from central Seoul.

== Geography ==
Jangan District lies in the north of Suwon. It is bordered by Uiwang to the north-west, Yongin to the north and east, Yeongtong District to the south-east, Paldal District to the south and Gwonseon District to the south west.

Jangan District's northern border, with Yongin, is the mountain of Gwanggyosan. At 582 metres above sea level, this is Suwon's highest point.

Most of the streams passing through Suwon originate in Jangan District, on Gwanggyosan or other nearby peaks. Since Suwon is bounded to the east by other hills, the streams, chiefly the Suwoncheon, flow southwards through the city, eventually emptying into the Yellow Sea at Asan Bay. The entirety of Suwon is drained in this manner.

== Administrative divisions ==
The administrative "dong" (wards) of Jangan District are as follow. These differ substantially from the postal "dong".

- Jeongja-dong (정자동; 亭子洞) (divided into Jeongja 1 to 3 Dong)
- Jowon-dong (조원동; 棗園洞) (divided into Jowon 1 and 2 Dong)
- Pajang-dong (파장동; 芭長洞) (divided into Pajang-dong and Imok-dong)
- Songjuk-dong (송죽동; 松竹洞)
- Yeonghwa-dong (영화동; 迎華洞)
- Yeonmu-dong (연무동; 鍊武洞) (divided into Yeonmu-dong, Sanggwanggyo-dong and Hagwanggyo-dong)
- Yulcheon-dong (율천동; 栗泉洞) (divided into Yuljeon-dong and Cheoncheon-dong)

== Education ==
There are 25 municipal and 19 private kindergartens, 20 municipal primary schools, 13 municipal middle schools, 9 municipal and 3 private high schools, 1 college, namely Dongnam Health College and one university, namely Sungkyunkwan University's natural science campus, in Jangan District.

=== High School ===
- Gyeonggi Science High School for the Gifted
- Gyeonggi Physical Education High School
- Daepyeong High School
- DongWon High school
- Susung High School
- Suwon High School for Agricultural Science
- Youngsaeng High School
- Jowon High School

== Recreation ==
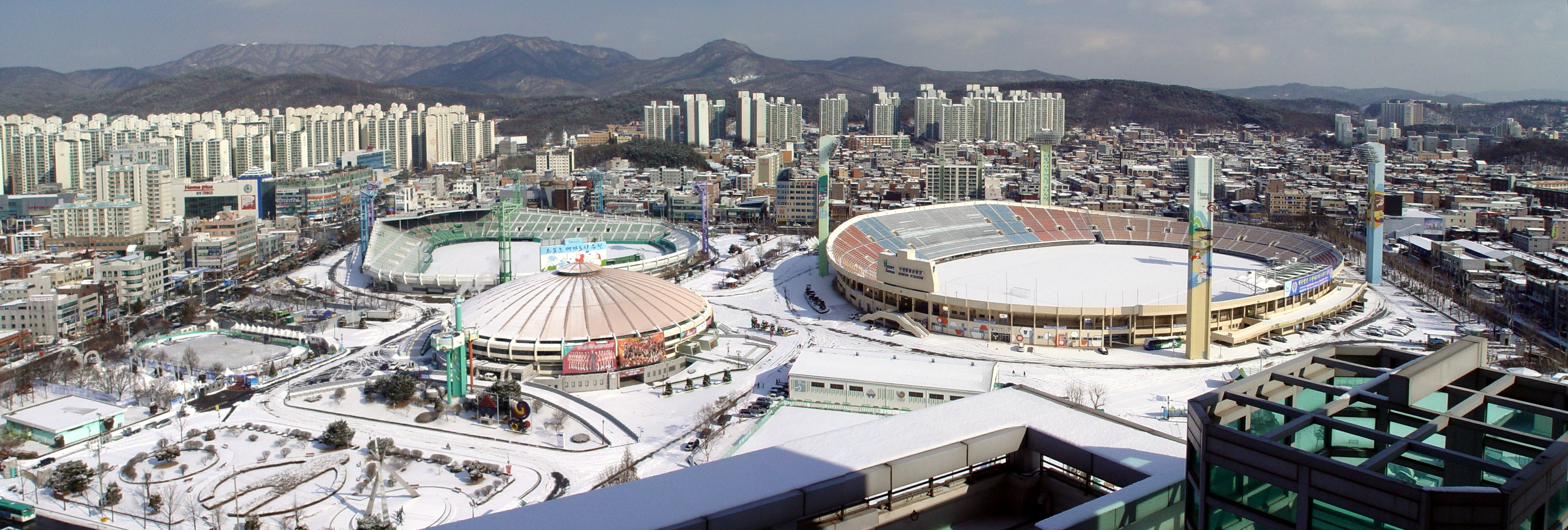
Suwon Civil Stadium, 2009

Jangan District is home to Suwon Civil Stadium, a multi-purpose sports complex which hosted the handball events of the 1988 Summer Olympics, and which is now home to KT Wiz baseball team and Suwon FC football team.

The area also contains Manseok Park, a recreational area surrounding a small reservoir.

== See also ==
- Suwon
- Gwonseon District
- Paldal District
- Yeongtong District
- Suwon Sports Complex
