= Jeongja-dong =

Jeongja-dong may refer to one of the following places in South Korea:

- Jeongja-dong, Seongnam
- Jeongja-dong, Suwon
