= Sungkyunkwan University station =

Metro station in Suwon, South Korea

Coordinates: 37°18′01″N 126°58′20″E

성균관대; Sungkyunkwan Univ.
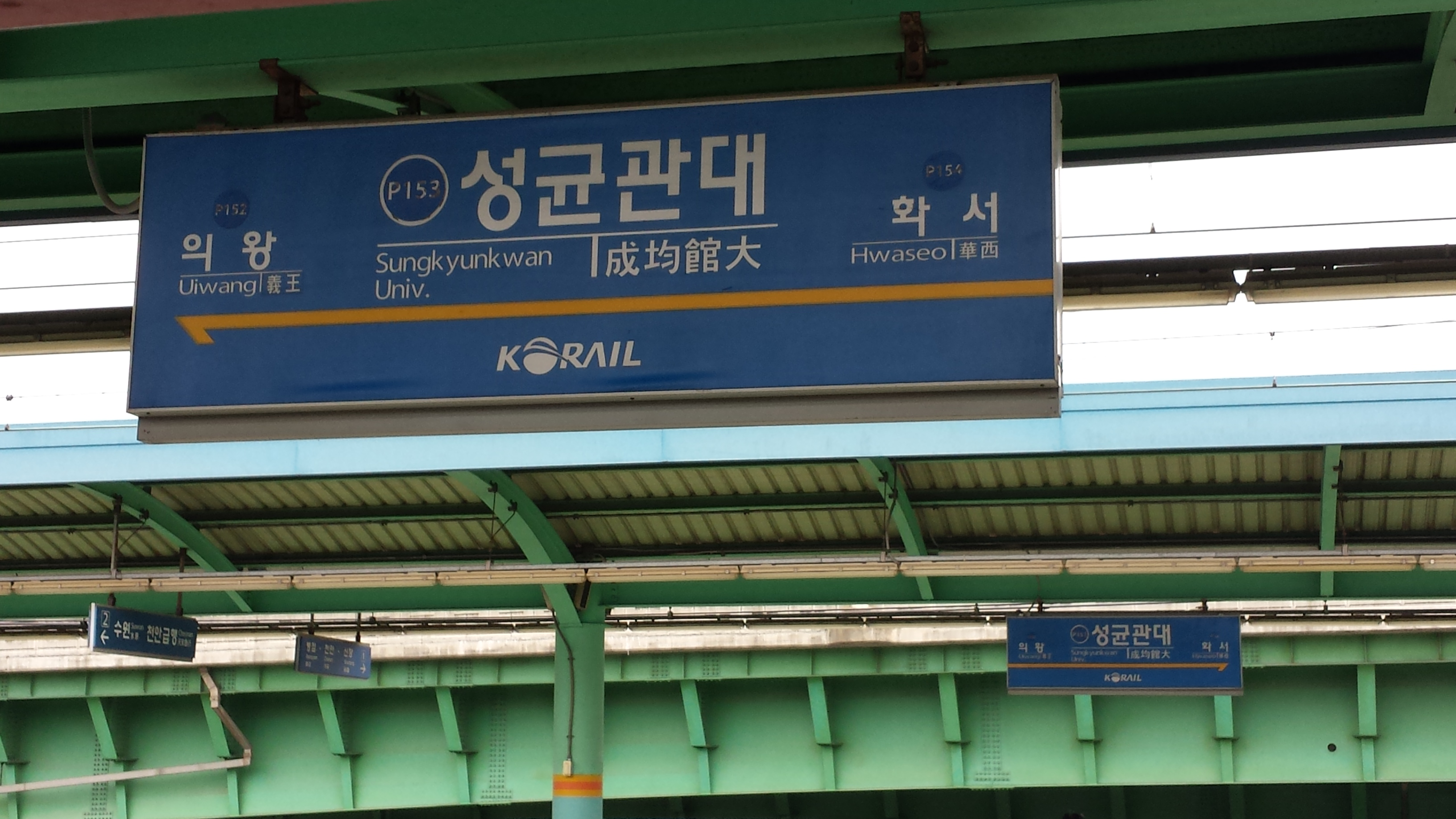
- Station Sign

Korean name
- Hangul: 성균관대역
- Hanja: 成均館大驛
- Revised Romanization: Seonggyun-gwandae-yeok
- McCune–Reischauer: Sŏnggyun'gwandae-yŏk

General information
- Location: 495-2 Yuljeon-dong, 2149 Seoburo, Jangan-gu, Suwon-si, Gyeonggi-do
- Operator: Korail
- Line: Line 1
- Platforms: 2
- Tracks: 4

Construction
- Structure type: Aboveground

History
- Opened: February 1, 1979
- Former names: Yuljeon, Seongdae-ap (until 1994)

Passengers
- (Daily) Based on Jan-Dec of 2012. Line 1: 31,594
Location

Sungkyunkwan University Station (Station P153) (Korean: 성균관대역) is a ground-level metro station on line 1 of the Seoul Subway in Yuljeon Dong, Jangan Gu, Suwon, South Korea. The station is nearby Sungkyunkwan University and Dongnam Health College. Travel time from Sungkyunkwan University Station to Seoul Station on Line 1 is 54 minutes, and travelling to Sungkyunkwan University's other campus, by Hyehwa Station in Seoul, takes 67 minutes, transferring to Line 4 at Geumjeong. The original station building was demolished, and a new, larger building incorporating shops, clinics, and a car park, was built, opening in late 2016.

== History ==
Sungkyunkwan University station opened on February 1, 1979, under the name of Yuljeon (율전역/栗田驛), a name taken from the dong in which it is located. Five years later, on January 1, 1984, it was renamed Seongdae-ap Station (성대앞역/成大앞驛), taking its name as an abbreviated form of the nearby Sungkyunkwan University campus. It was only on December 1, 1994 that it took its current full name of Sungkyunkwan University. In 2008, Suwon City Council operated a 20-day public consultation on changing the name of the station once again. It had three suggestions, being a return to the name Yuljeon (율전/栗田), Yuljeon (Sungkyunkwan Univ.) (율전(성균관대)/栗田(成均館大)) and Sungkyunkwan University (Yuljeon) (성균관대(율전)/成均館大(栗田)), though it was also possible for the public to suggest alternative names. At the end of this consultation period, no change was made.

== Services ==
The first train of the day weekdays (not including national holidays) is at 5.18 a.m. northbound and 5.33 a.m. southbound, while the last is at 11.57 p.m. northbound and 12.18 a.m. southbound. Northbound trains have various destinations. Some terminate at Guro, some at Dongmyo, others at Cheongnyangni, while some continue as far as Kwangwoon University. None however, continue beyond Kwangwoon University, so if travelling beyond is required, it is necessary to change trains. Some southbound trains terminate at Byeongjeom, while the remainder continue to Cheonan or Sinchang. Express subway trains stop at the station.

== Photos ==
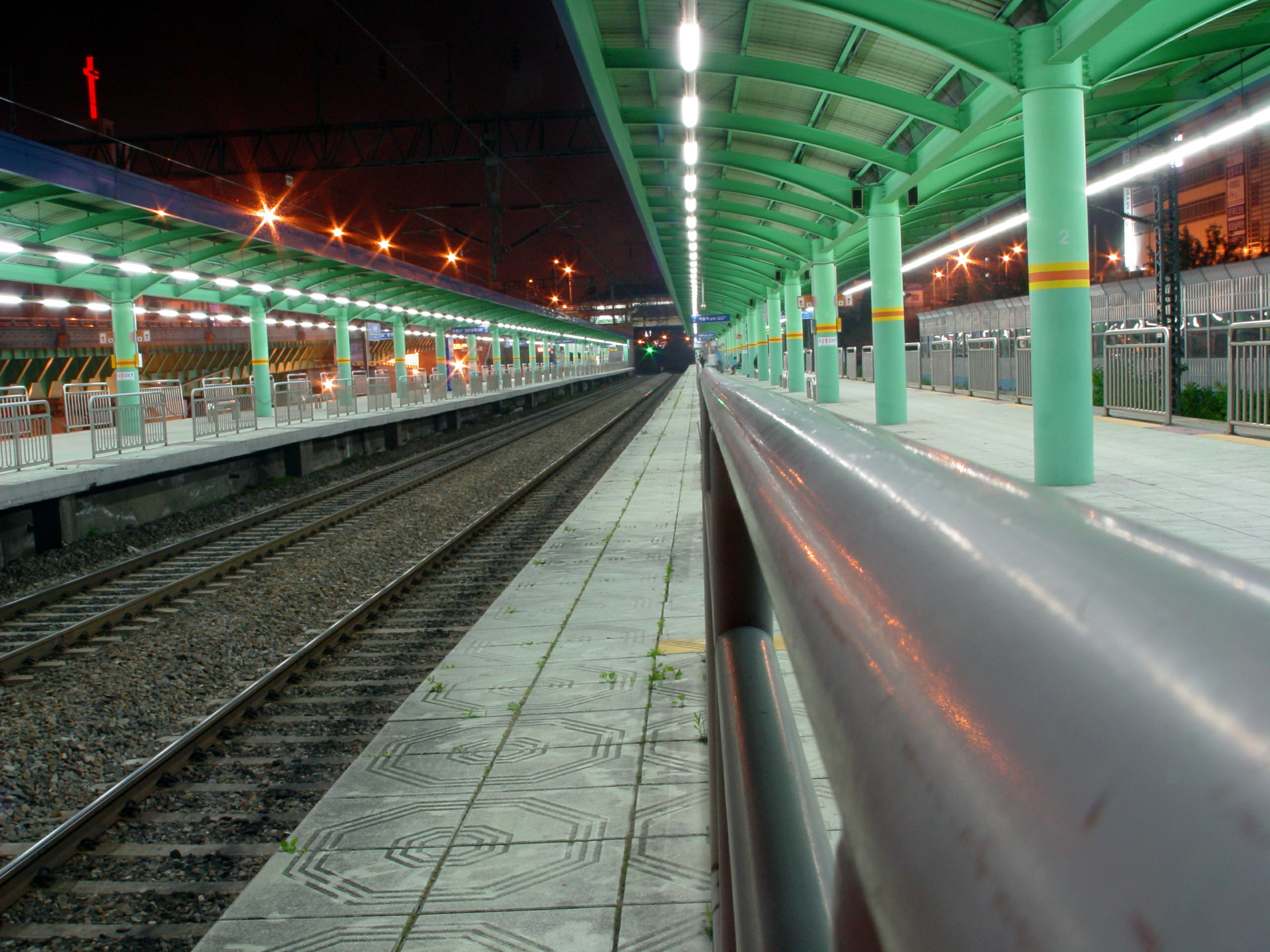
The platforms at night

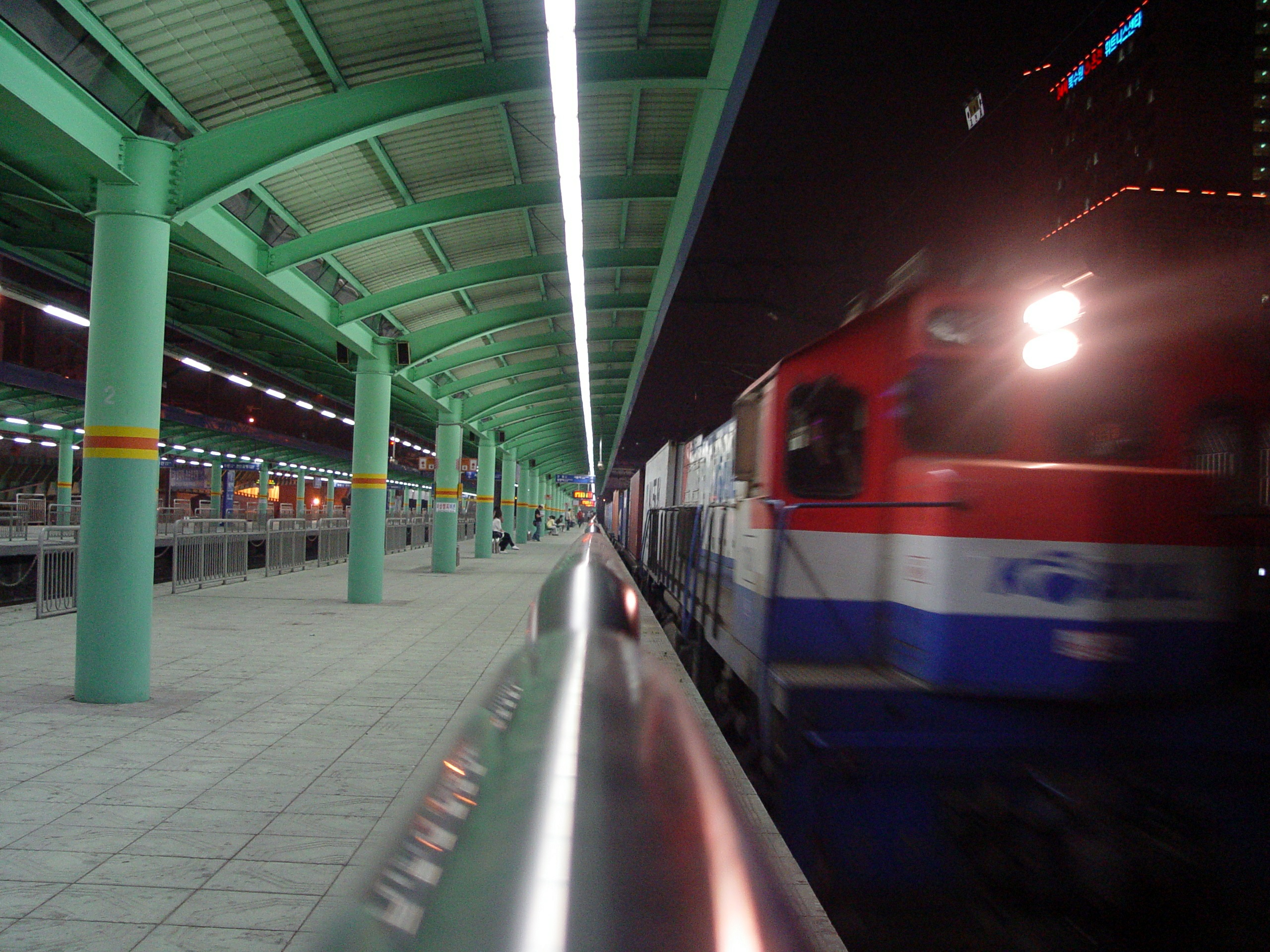
A goods train passing through at night

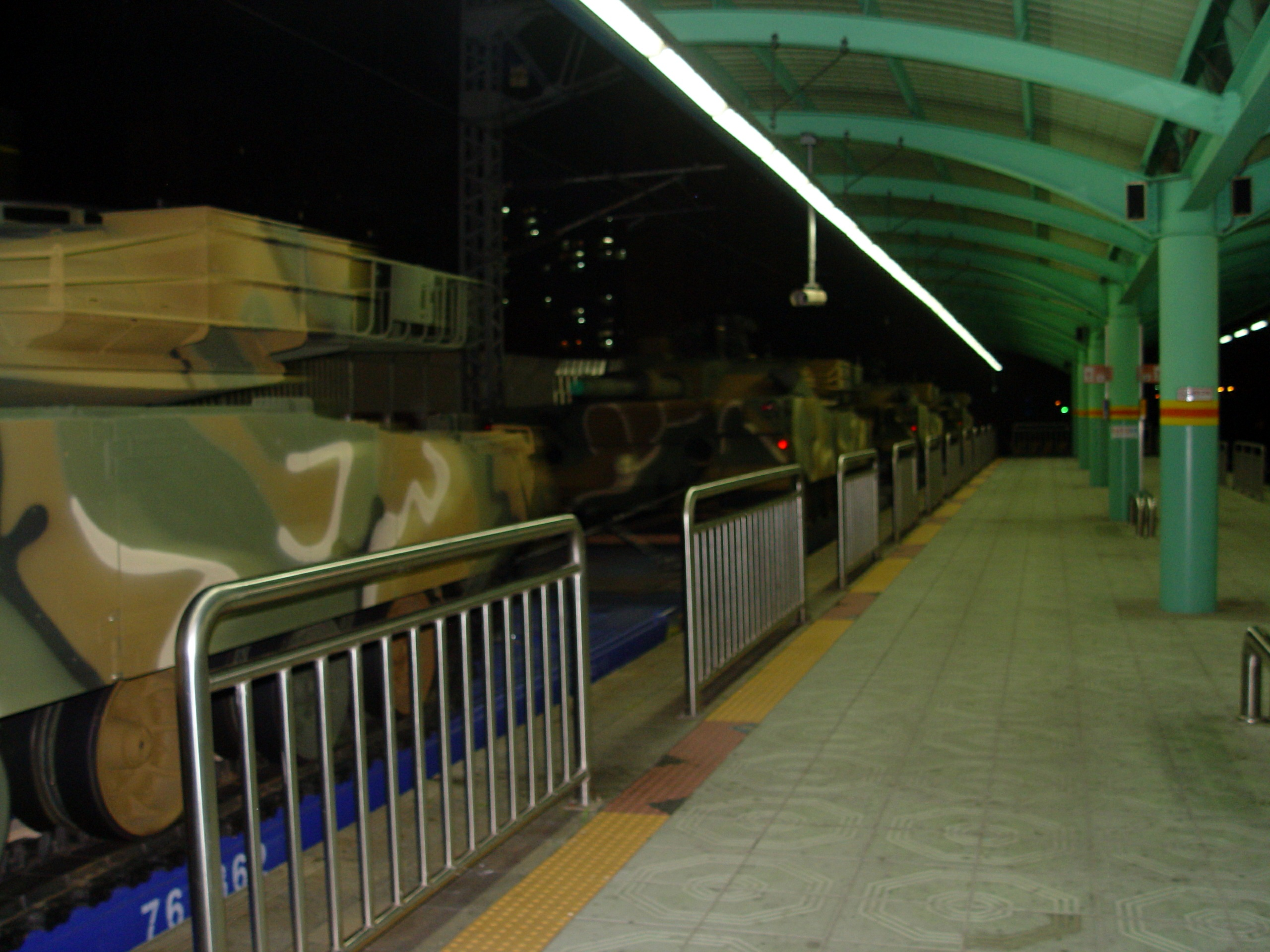
Tanks passing through the station

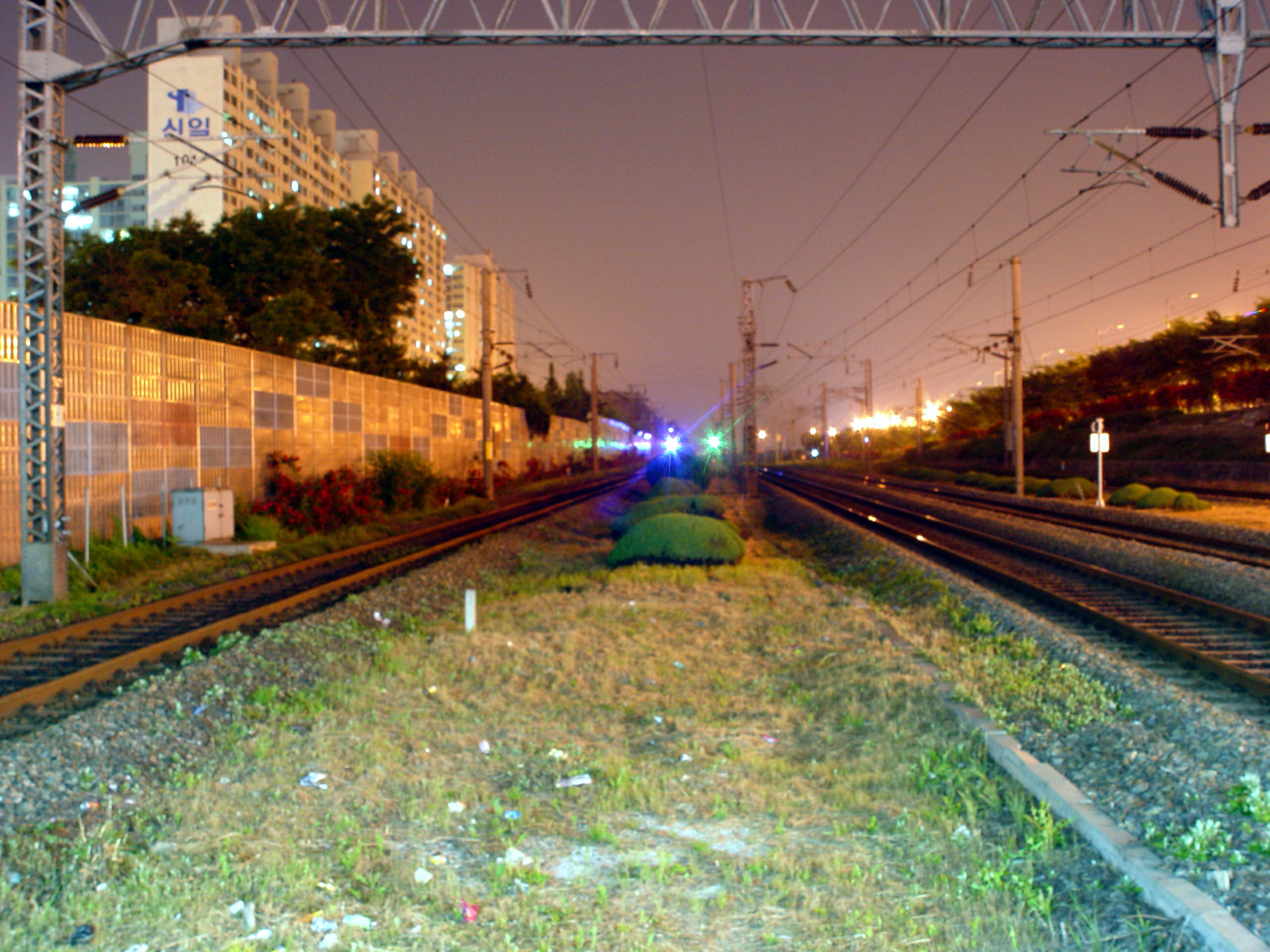
The tracks towards Uiwang

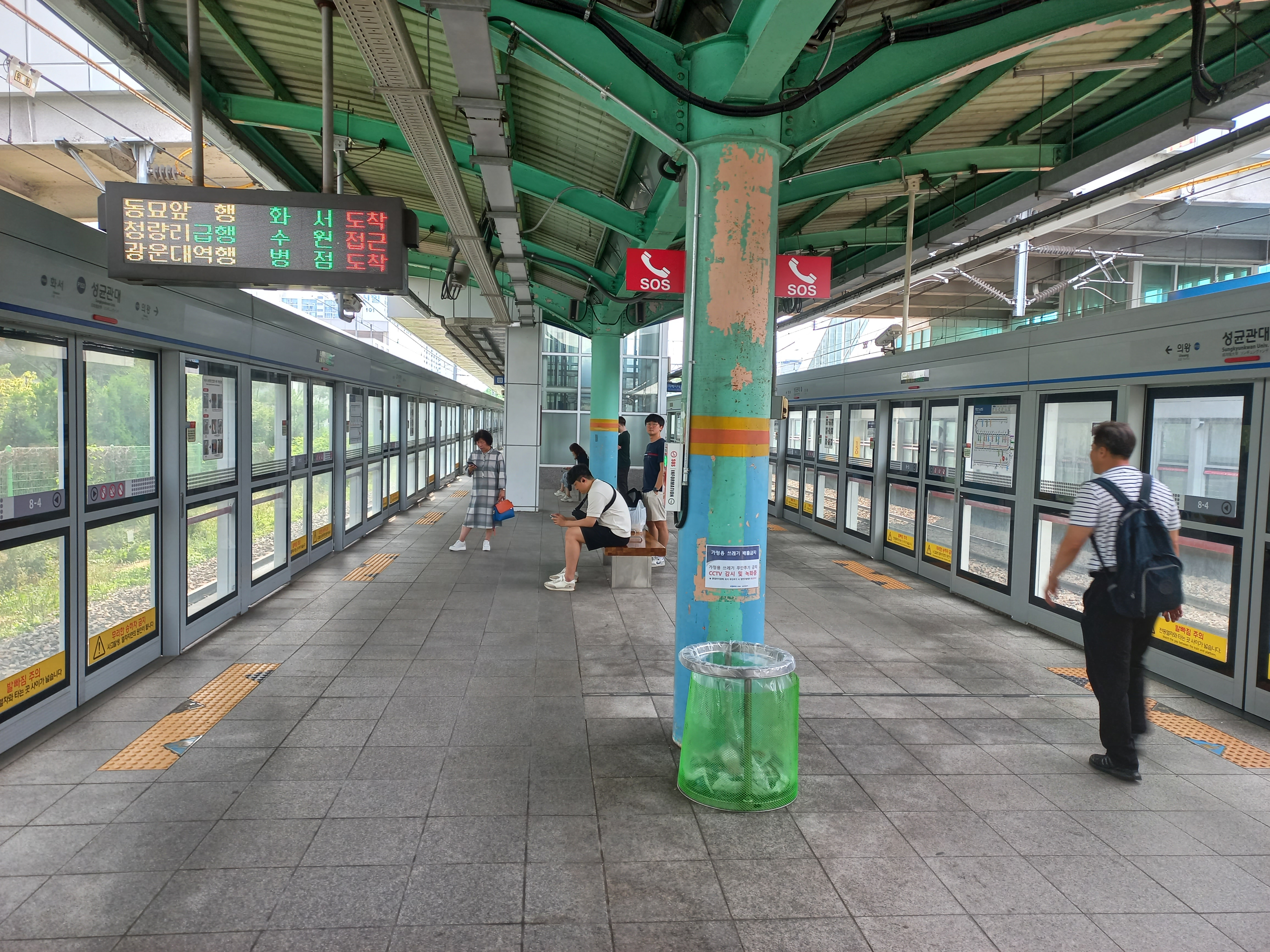
Line 1 platforms (2023)

Preceding station	Seoul Metropolitan Subway	Following station
Uiwang towards Kwangwoon University	Line 1	Hwaseo towards Seodongtan or Sinchang
Uiwang towards Cheongnyangni or Seoul	Line 1 Gyeongbu Express	Suwon towards Sinchang
