= Paldal District =

District of Suwon, South Korea

- Non-autonomous District
- A panoramic view of the Paldalmun Gate and the buildings surrounding it.

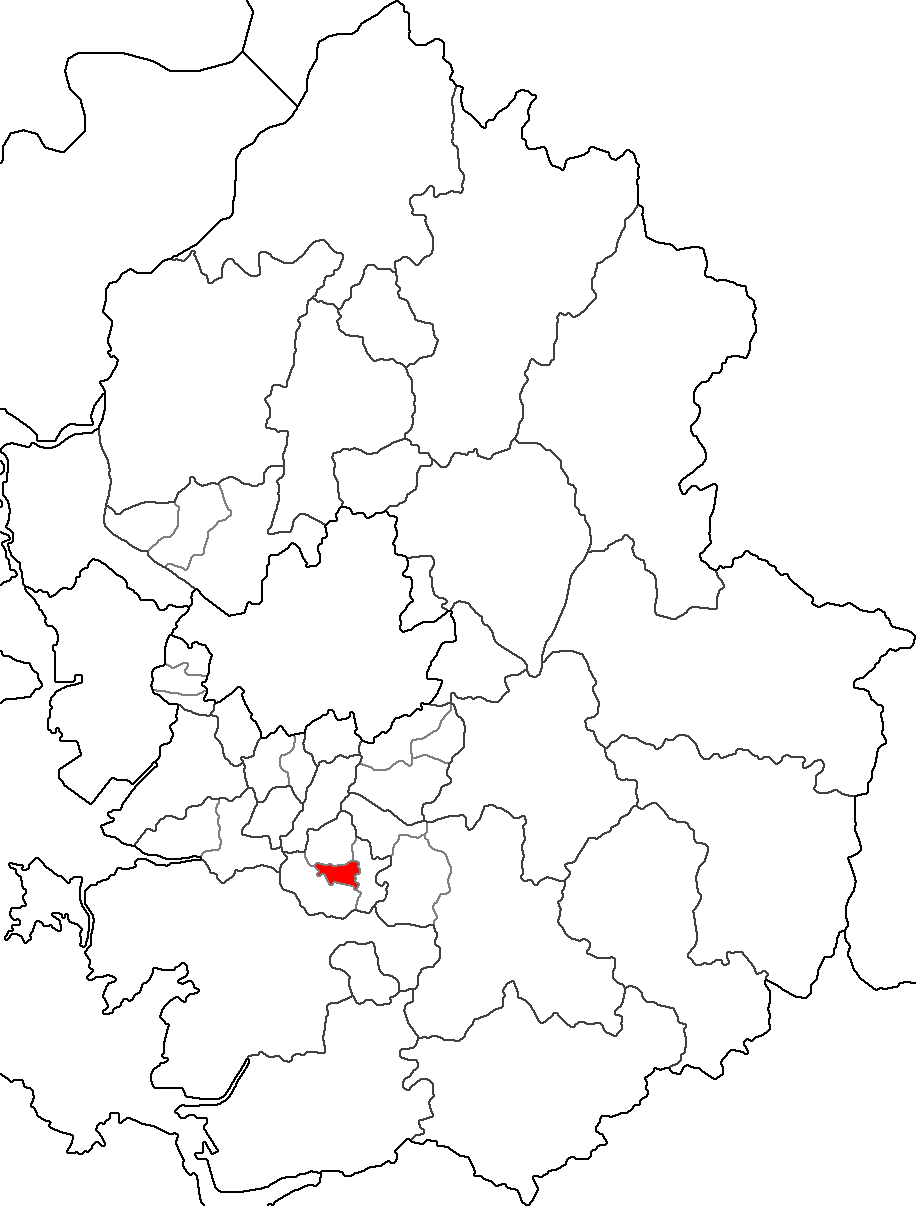
- Map of Gyeonggi highlighting Paldal District.
- Country: South Korea
- Region: Sudogwon (Gijeon)
- Province: Gyeonggi
- City: Suwon

Area
  - Total: 12.86 km^{2} (4.97 sq mi)

Population (2015)
  - Total: 217,093
  - Dialect: Seoul
- Website: Paldal-gu Office

Korean name
- Hangul: 팔달구
- Hanja: 八達區
- RR: Paldal-gu
- MR: P'altal-gu

Paldal District (Korean: 팔달구) is the central district of the city of Suwon in Gyeonggi Province, South Korea.

== Administrative divisions ==
Paldal District is divided into the following "dong"s.

- Godeung-dong (고등동)
- Hwaseo-dong (화서동), divided in turn into Hwaseo 1 and 2 dong
- Ingye-dong (인계동)
- Ji-dong (지동)
- Haenggung-dong (행궁동), divided in turn into Paldalno 1 to 3 Ga, Namchang-dong, Yeong-dong, Jung-dong, Gucheon-dong, Namsu-dong, Buksu-dong, Maehyang-dong, Sinpung-dong and Jangan-dong
- Maegyo-dong (매교동), divided in turn into Maegyo-dong and Gyo-dong
- Maesan-dong (매산동), divided in turn into Maesanno 1 to 3 Ga
- Uman-dong (우만동), divided in turn into Uman 1 and 2 dong

== Cultural assets ==
The area contains the historic Gyo-dong area, in which Suwon Hyanggyo, the old City Hall, and Bugugwon lie, and Paldalmun, the south gate of Hwaseong Fortress is also here.

== Critical Infrastructure ==
- Gyeonggi-do Provincial Office
- Suwon City Hall
- Paldal-gu office
- Gyeonggi-do Culture ＆ Art Center
- Suwon World Cup Stadium

== See also ==
- Suwon
- Gwonseon District
- Jangan District
- Yeongtong District
