= Yeongtong District =

District of Suwon, South Korea

Coordinates: 37.2595°N 127.0465°E

- Non-autonomous District
- A panoramic view of the Gwanggyo Lake Park and buildings surrounding it

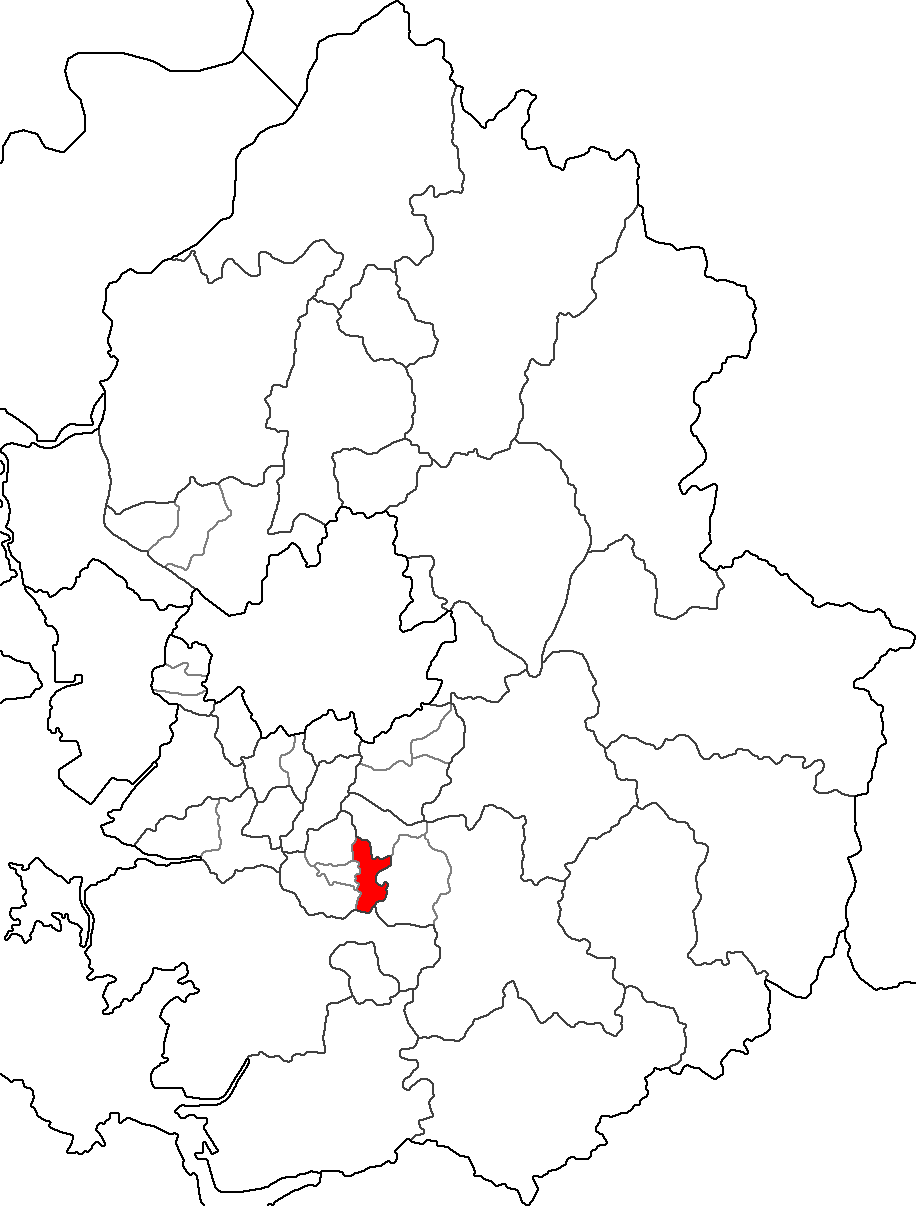
- Map of Gyeonggi highlighting Yeongtong District
- Country: South Korea
- Region: Sudogwon (Gijeon)
- Province: Gyeonggi
- City: Suwon

Area
  - Total: 27.5 km^{2} (10.6 sq mi)

Population (2007)
  - Total: 257,318
  - Dialect: Seoul
- Website: Yeongtong-gu Office

Korean name
- Hangul: 영통구
- Hanja: 靈通區
- RR: Yeongtong-gu
- MR: Yŏngt'ong-gu

Yeongtong District (Korean: 영통구), established in 2003, is the eastern district of the city of Suwon in Gyeonggi Province, South Korea. It is split from Paldal District and is Suwon's newest "gu".

== Administrative divisions ==
Yeongtong Gu is divided into the following "dong"s.

- Maetan-dong (매탄동) (divided in turn into Maetan 1 to 4 Dong)
- Taejang-dong (태장동) (divided in turn into Mangpo-dong and Sin-dong)
- Woncheon-dong (원천동) (divided in turn into Woncheon-dong)
- Yeongtong-dong (영통동) (divided in turn into Yeongtong 1 and 2 Dong)
- Gwanggyo 1-dong (광교1동) (Legal Dong into Iui-dong)
- Gwanggyo 2-dong (광교2동) (Legal Dong into Ha-dong)

== See also ==
- Suwon
- Gwonseon District
- Jangan District
- Paldal District
