= Starfield (shopping mall) =

South Korean shopping mall chain

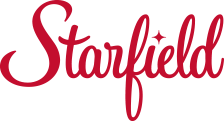
Starfield (shopping mall) Logotype

Starfield is a chain of shopping malls under the Shinsegae Group.

== Branches ==
Name	Location
Starfield Hanam	Hanam
Starfield COEX Mall	Seoul
Starfield Goyang	Goyang
Starfield Anseong	Anseong
Starfield Suwon	Suwon
Starfield City MyeongJi	Busan
