= Dongnam Health University =

Technical college in Suwon, South Korea

Coordinates: 37°17′55″N 126°59′13″E

- 동남보건대학교
- Established: 1973
- President: Lee Young Kwon
- Location: 경기도 수원시 장안구 정자동 937 (937 Jeongja-dong, Jangan Gu, Suwon, Gyeonggi-do), Suwon, Gyeonggi-do, South Korea
- Campus: Urban
- Colors: Green
- Website: dongnam.ac.kr

- Dongnam Health University
- Hangul: 동남보건대학교
- Hanja: 東南保健大學校
- RR: Dongnam bogeon daehakgyo
- MR: Tongnam pogŏn taehakkyo

Dongnam Health University (Korean: 동남보건대학교), previously Dongnam Health College, is a South Korean technical college specializing in the health sciences. Its campus is on the north bank of the Seohocheon in Suwon, Gyeonggi province. The current president is Lee Young Kwon (이영권) and about 40 instructors are employed.

== Academics ==
The college provides training through its five divisions: Health Science (which includes radiology and physical therapy), Social Science (including early childhood education and tourism interpretation), Nursing, Engineering Science, and Home Economics (which consists of the Department of Food and Nutrition).

== History ==
The college opened its doors in 1973 as Dongnam Health Junior School (동남보건전문학교). It became a technical college in 1979. It took its current name in 2009.

== Sister schools ==
The college maintains ties with institutions in five countries: Japan, New Zealand, China, the United States, and Germany.

== See also ==
- List of colleges and universities in South Korea
- Education in South Korea
