= Gwonseon District =

District of Suwon, South Korea

- Non-autonomous District
- Suwon Tap-dong Citizen's Farm in Gwonseon District

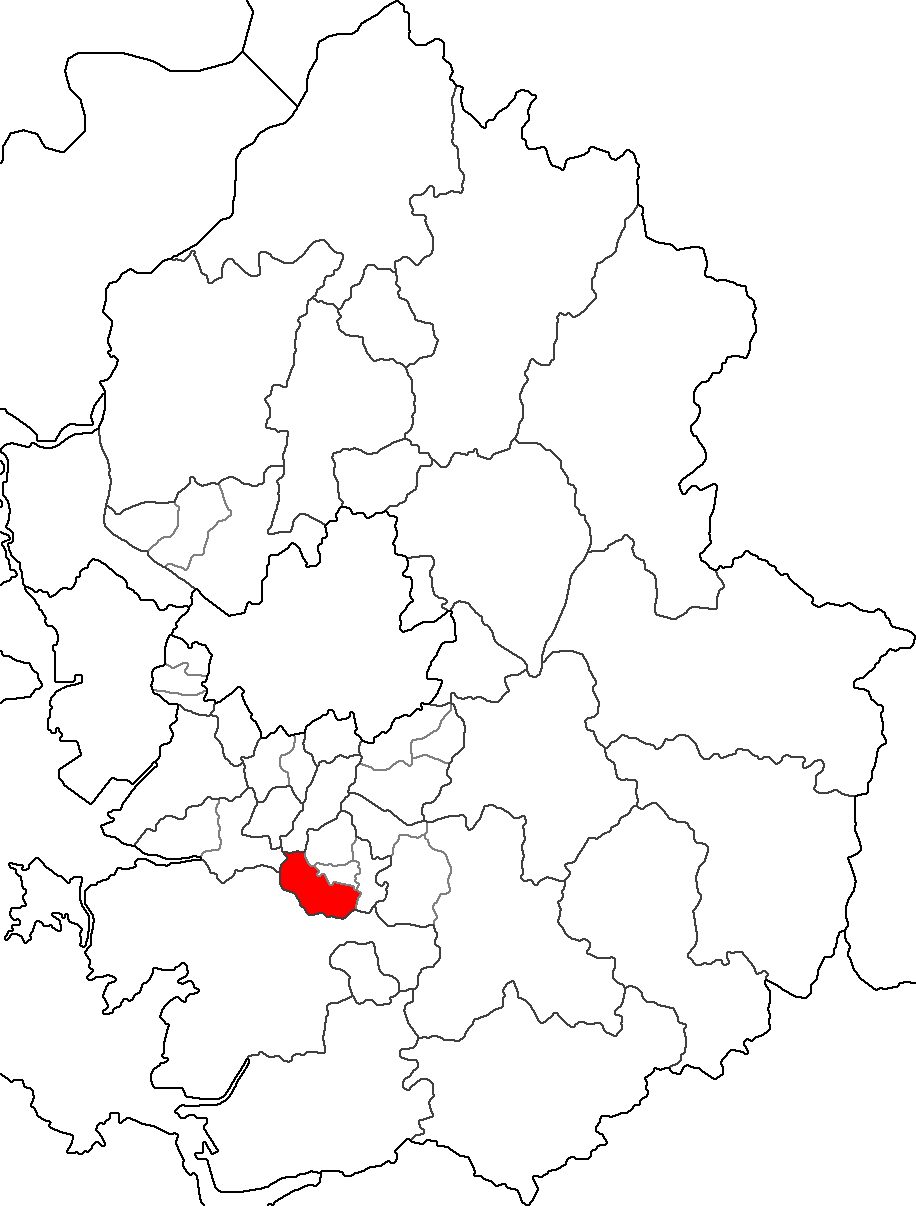
- Map of Gyeonggi highlighting Gwonseon District.
- Country: South Korea
- Region: Sudogwon (Gijeon)
- Province: Gyeonggi
- City: Suwon

Government
  - Mayor: Kim Jong-suk (김종석)

Area
  - Total: 47.4 km^{2} (18.3 sq mi)

Population (2024)
  - Total: 363,133
  - Dialect: Seoul
- Website: Gwonseon District Office

Korean name
- Hangul: 권선구
- Hanja: 勸善區
- RR: Gwonseon-gu
- MR: Kwŏnsŏn-gu

Gwonseon District (Korean: 권선구) is the south-western district of the city of Suwon in Gyeonggi Province, South Korea.

== History ==
Gwonseon in "Gwonseonjingak" (勸善懲惡) refers to "encouraging virtue." The district's name originates from Gwonseon-dong, which was located at the center of the area when it was established in 1988. The name traces back to the late Goryeo period, when a scholar named Lee Go lived in seclusion on Mount Paldal and came down to Mangcheon (now the Suwoncheon area) to encourage people to live virtuously. This story became the basis for the name "Gwonseon-dong."

In 1988, when Suwon's population surpassed 500,000, the southern part of the city was established as Gwonseon-gu, while the northern part became Jangan-gu. At that time, areas such as Maesan-ro in front of Suwon Station, Godeung-dong, Ingye-dong, Maetan-dong, and Woncheon-dong were all under Gwonseon-gu's jurisdiction.

== Administrative divisions ==
Gwonseon District is divided into the following "dong"s.

- Geumgok-dong (금곡동)
- Homaesil-dong (호매실동)
- Gokseon-dong (곡선동) (divided in turn into Gokbanjeong-dong, Daehwanggyo-dong and Gwonseon-dong)
- Guun-dong (구운동)
- Gwonseon-dong (권선동) (divided in turn into Gwonseon 1 and 2 dong)
- Ipbuk-dong (입북동) (divided in turn into Ipbuk-dong and Dangsu-dong)
- Pyeong-dong (평동) (divided in turn into Pyeong-dong, Pyeongni-dong, Gosaek-dong and Omokcheon-dong)
- Seodun-dong (서둔동) (divided in turn into Seodun-dong and Tap-dong)
- Seryu-dong (세류동) (divided in turn into Seryu 1 to 3 dong [Seryu 2 Dong: Jangji-dong])

== Education ==
=== High School ===
- Gyeonggi Daemyeong High School
- Gosaek High School
- Gokjeong High School
- Kwonsun High School
- Hanbom High School

=== Middle School ===
- Gosaek Middle School
- Gokban Middle School
- Kokson Middle School
- Guwoon Middle School
- Kwonseon Middle School

== Critical Infrastructure ==
- Gwonseon District office
- West Suwon Library
- Gyeonggi-do Youth Cultural Creation Center(Gyeonggi Sangsang campus)
- Seoul National University Arboretum

== See also ==
- Suwon
- Jangan District
- Paldal District
- Yeongtong District
