= Hwaseo station =

Metro station in Suwon, South Korea

Coordinates: 37°17′06″N 126°59′20″E

화서 (스타필드 수원); Hwaseo (Starfield Suwon)
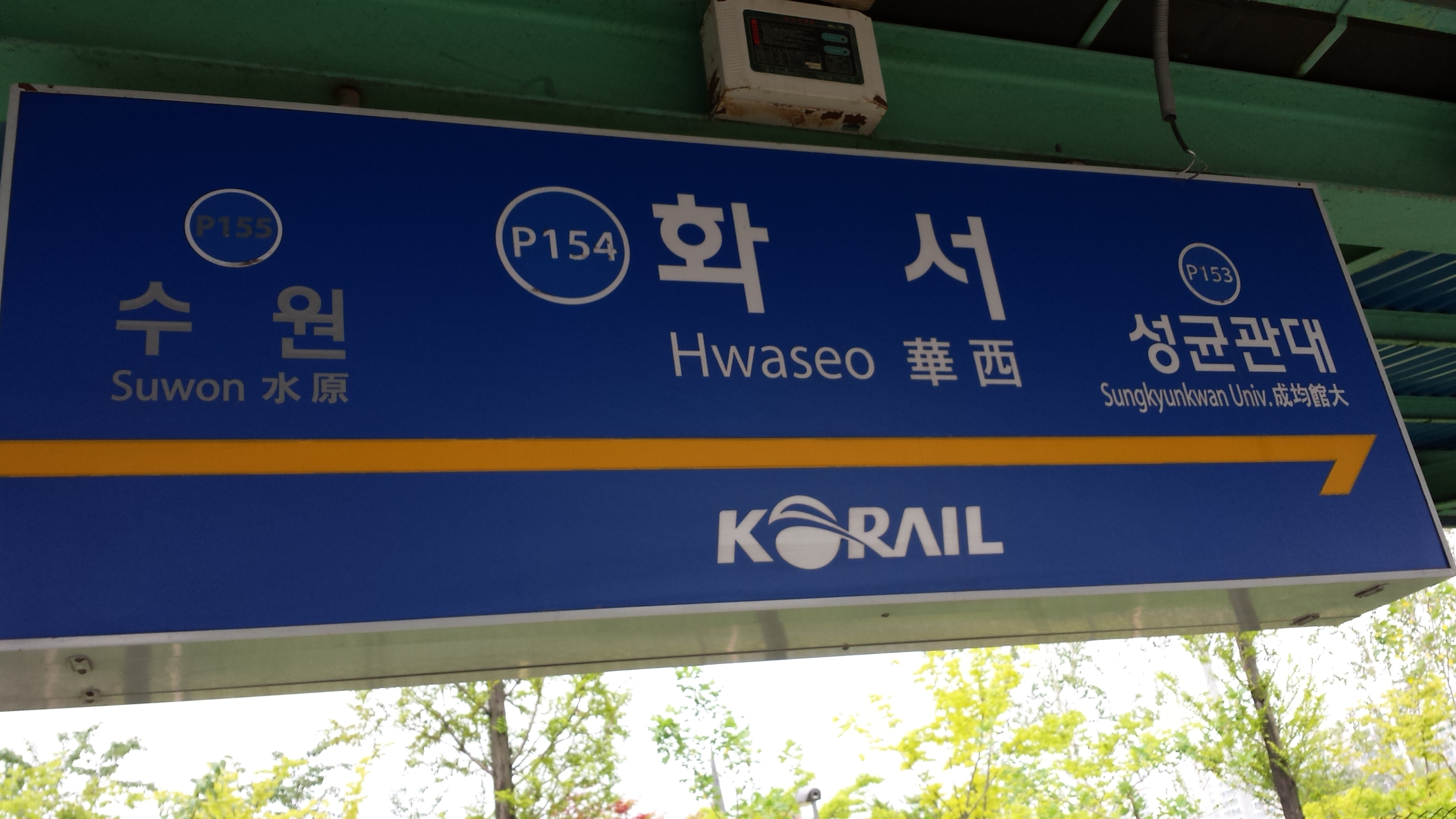
- Station Sign

Korean name
- Hangul: 화서역
- Hanja: 華西驛
- RR: Hwaseo-yeok
- MR: Hwasŏ-yŏk

General information
- Location: 464 Hwaseo 2-dong, 692 Deokyeongdaero, Paldal-gu, Suwon-si, Gyeonggi-do
- Operator: Korail
- Line: Line 1
- Platforms: 2
- Tracks: 4

Construction
- Structure type: Aboveground

Key dates
- August 15, 1974: Line 1 opened

Passengers
- (Daily) Based on Jan-Dec of 2012. Line 1: 17,376
Location

Hwaseo Station (Korean: 화서역) is a ground-level metro station on line 1 of the Seoul Subway in north-west Suwon, South Korea.

Hwaseo offers access to several important academic, governmental and cultural locations including Hwaseong Fortress, Manseok Park, the Korean National Institute of Agricultural Science and Technology and Suwon Immigration Office, as well as being the nearest station to Seoho, a sizeable lake and park.

Travel time from Hwaseo to central Seoul on Line 1 is approximately 80 minutes, with slightly shorter journey times possible by transferring to Line 4 at Geumjeong. To save time when exiting, you should try to be in the front subway cars when traveling north, towards Seoul, and in the back subway cars when traveling south, towards Suwon and Cheonan.

The sub-name "Starfield Suwon" was added on January 6, 2024.

It is planned to become a transfer station to the Shinbundang Line in 2027.

Preceding station	Seoul Metropolitan Subway	Following station
Sungkyunkwan University towards Kwangwoon University	Line 1	Suwon towards Seodongtan or Sinchang
