= Chilbosan (Gyeonggi) =

Hill in Gyeonggi Province, South Korea

- Chilbosan seen from Sungkyunkwan University, Suwon.

Highest point
- Elevation: 239 m (784 ft)
- Coordinates: 37°15′N 126°56′E

Geography
- Location: South Korea

Climbing
- Easiest route: Hike

- Chilbosan
- Hangul: 칠보산
- Hanja: 七寶山
- RR: Chilbosan
- MR: Ch'ilbosan

Chilbosan is a hill on the border of Suwon and Ansan, Hwaseong in Gyeonggi Province, South Korea. It stands 239 metres above sea level and 6 km from the Yellow Sea coast. A road from the south-east also runs up Chilbosan.
