= Gwanggyosan =

Mountain in Suwon and Yongin, South Korea

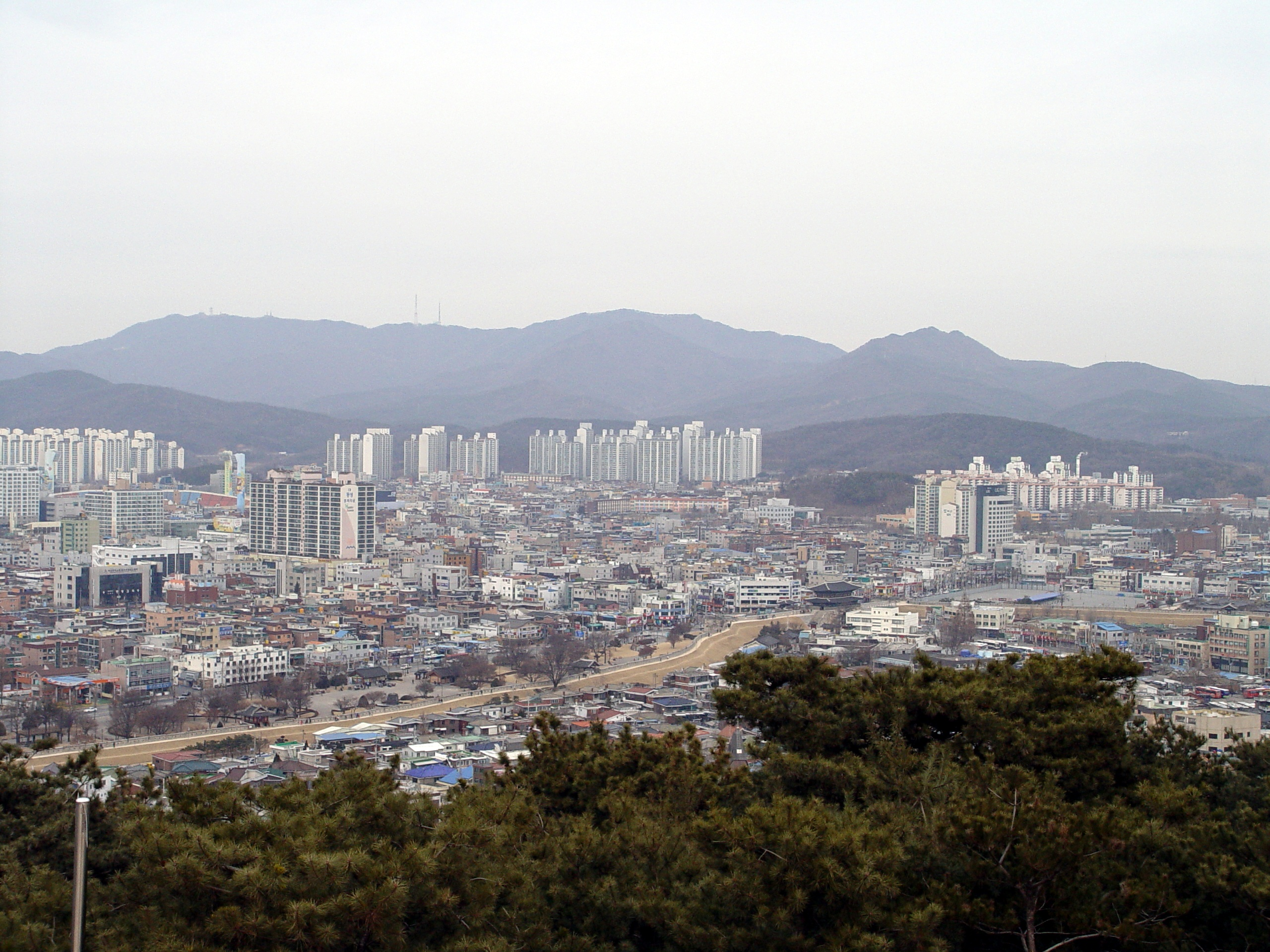
- Gwanggyosan seen from Hwaseong, Suwon

Highest point
- Elevation: 582 m (1,909 ft)
- Prominence: 582 m (1,909 ft)
- Coordinates: 37°20′41″N 127°02′02″E

Geography
- Location: South Korea
- Parent range: Gwanggyosan Range

Climbing
- Easiest route: Gwanggyo Reservoir, Suwon

Korean name
- Hangul: 광교산
- Hanja: 光敎山
- RR: Gwanggyosan
- MR: Kwanggyosan

Gwanggyosan (Korean: 광교산) is a 582 m tall mountain in Gyeonggi Province, South Korea. It lies on the border of Suwon and Yongin, though the wider range extends north and so also borders Uiwang, Gwacheon, Seoul, and Seongnam.

The summit offers views across Suwon, Yongin, and Bundang. The mountain is commonly hiked from Gwanggyo Reservoir in Suwon.

== Gwanggyosan and Pungsu ==
Interpreted within the context of traditional Korean logic and beliefs – especially within the realm of Korean Confucianism – Gwanggyosan serves as Suwon's jinsan, or Guardian Mountain. This is in keeping with the logic of pungsu (known as feng shui in China), which avers that an ideal site for a city or town is one where there is a jinsan to the north, an open vista, river or a large body of water to the south, and either mountains or valleys to the east and west. As Suwon's jinsan, Gwanggyosan provides a natural landmark indicating the city's position to travelers and acts as a sort of "shield" against the harsh winds from the north in wintertime. Aiding Gwanggyosan in providing a favorable sense of pungsu to Suwon are the flat farms and paddies in the southern portions of Gwonseon District and Yeongtong District, Chilbosan to the west, and the hills along Suwon's border with Yongin to the east.

== Gallery ==
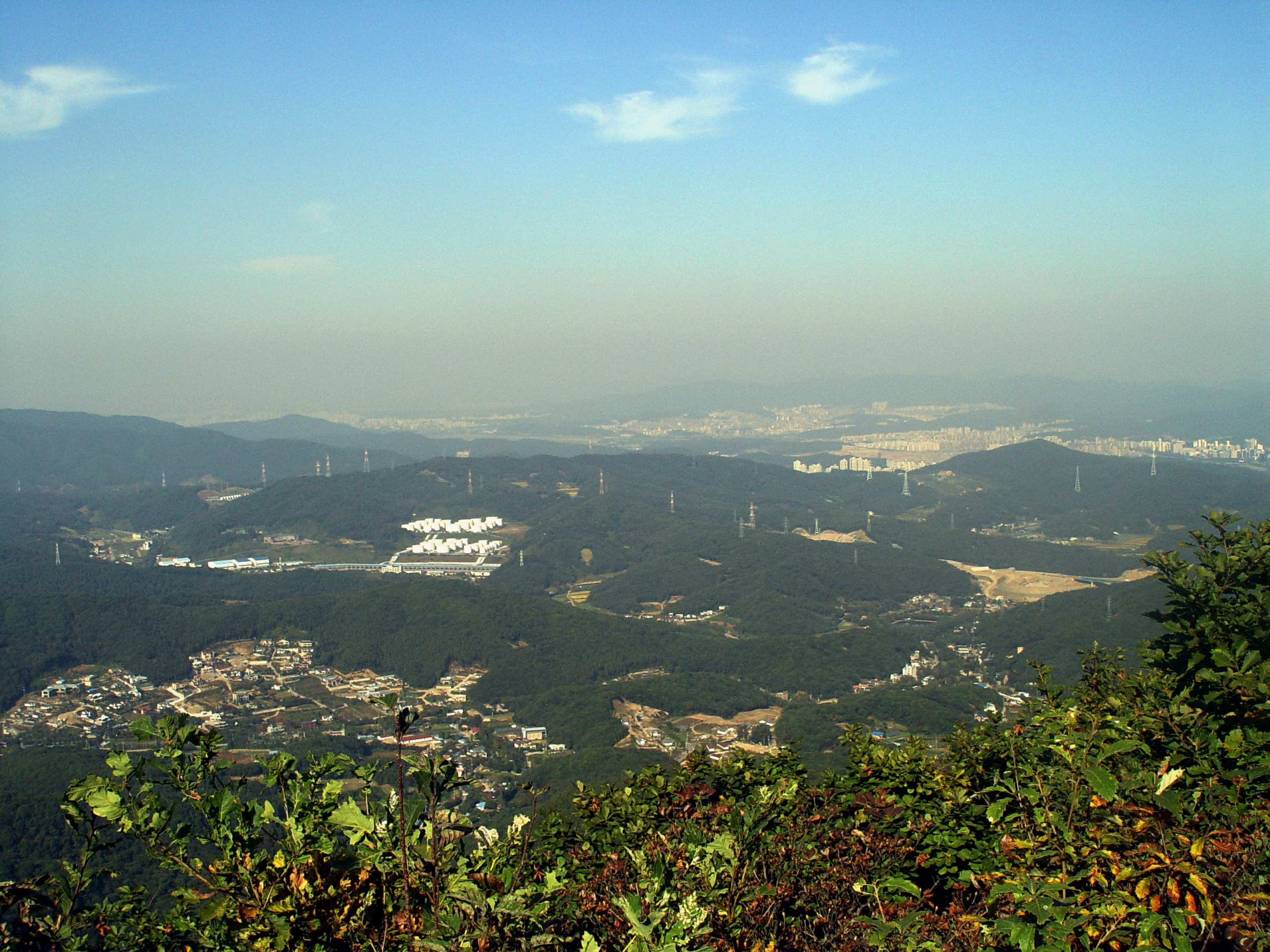
SE Seoul and Seongnam seen from Gwanggyosan

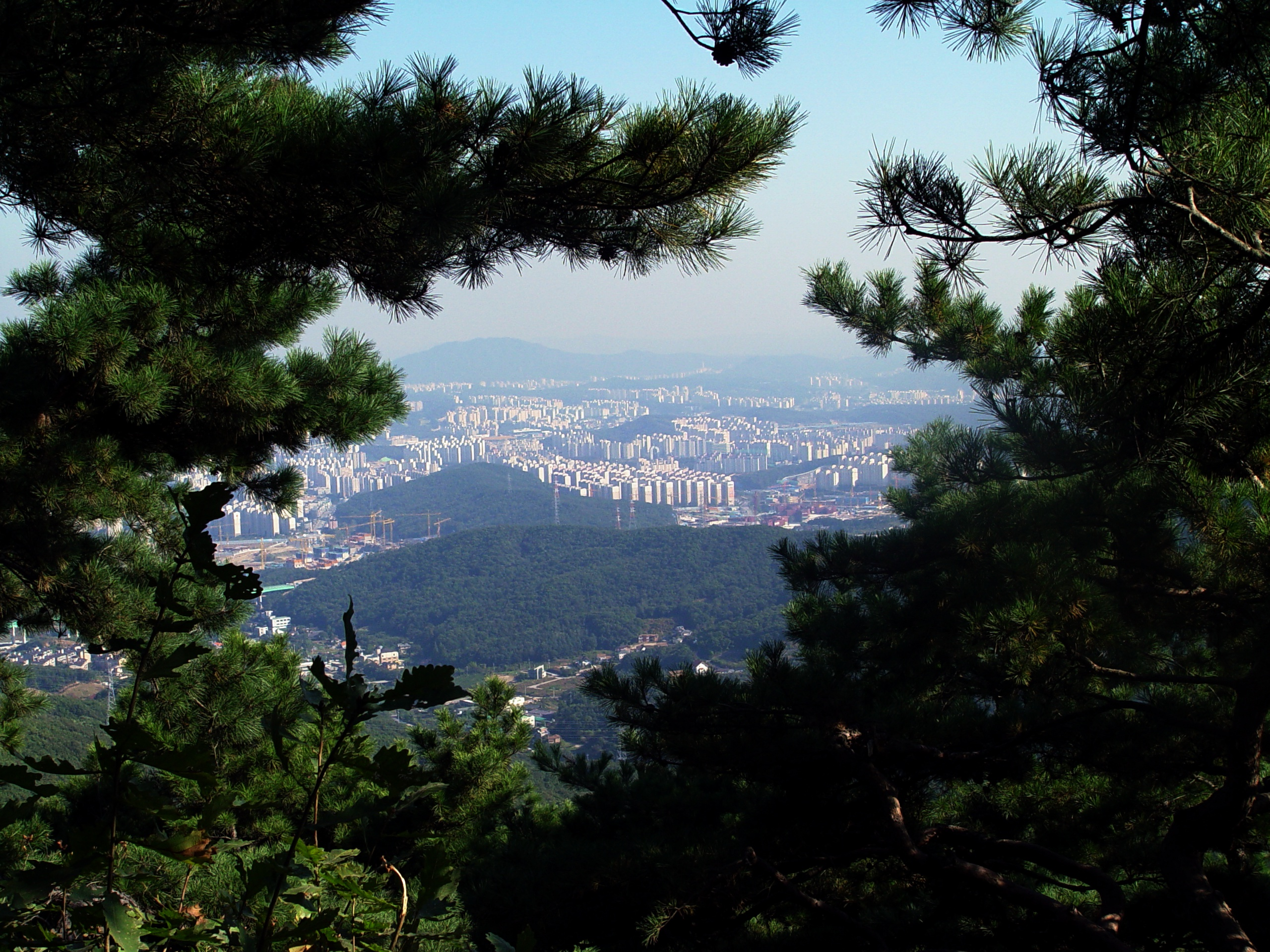
Suji seen from Gwanggyosan

== See also ==
- List of mountains in Korea
