= Seoul metropolitan area =

Metropolitan area in South Korea

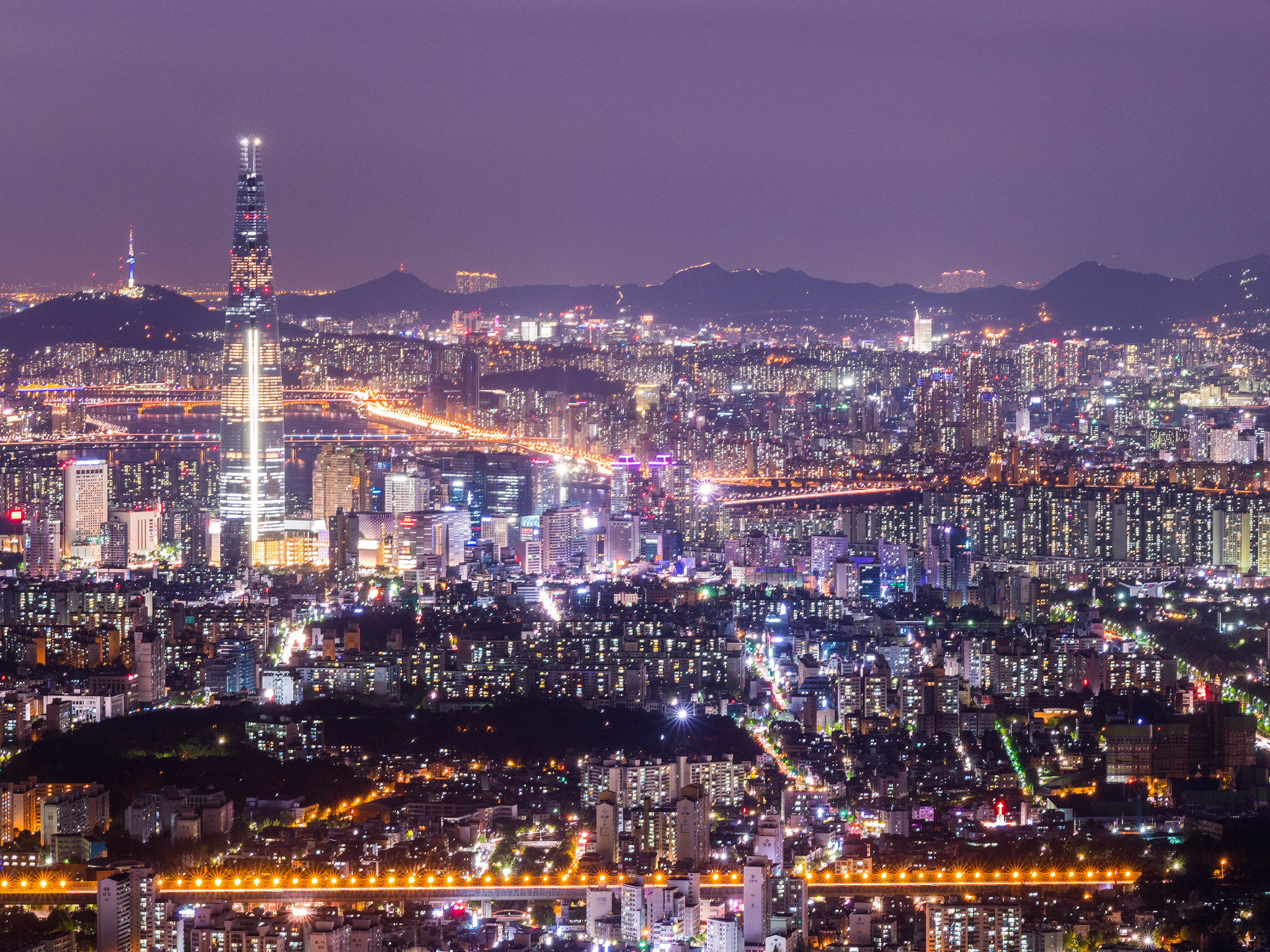
- Seoul, the largest city in the metropolitan area

- Seoul; Incheon; Gyeonggi-do; Cities outside Sudogwon on Seoul Metropolitan Subway
- Coordinates: 37°34′0.001″N 126°58′41.002″E
- Country: South Korea
- Major cities: Seoul; Incheon; Suwon; Ansan; Anyang; Goyang; Seongnam; Bucheon; Yongin

Area
  - Metropolitan area: 12,685 km^{2} (4,898 sq mi)

Population (2020)
  - Metro: 26,037,000
  - Metro density: 2,053/km^{2} (5,320/sq mi)
  - Percentage of South Korea's total population: ~55% (51 million)

GDP (nominal, 2024)
  - Metro: US$ 991.249 billion
- HDI (2023): 0.967 very high · 1st

Korean name
- Hangul: 수도권
- Hanja: 首都圈
- RR: Sudogwon
- MR: Sudokwŏn

Gyeonggi region
- Hangul: 경기 지방
- Hanja: 京畿地方
- RR: Gyeonggi jibang
- MR: Kyŏnggi chibang

The Seoul metropolitan area (Sudogwon; Korean: 수도권; [sʰu.do.k͈wʌn]) or Gyeonggi region (경기 지방), is the metropolitan area of Seoul, Incheon, and Gyeonggi Province, located in north-western South Korea. Its population of 26 million (as of 2024) is ranked as the ninth-largest metropolitan area in the world. Its area is about 12,685 km^{2} (4,898 sq mi). It forms the cultural, commercial, financial, industrial, and residential center of South Korea. The largest city is Seoul, with a population of approximately 10 million people, followed by Incheon, with three million inhabitants.

== Geography and climate ==
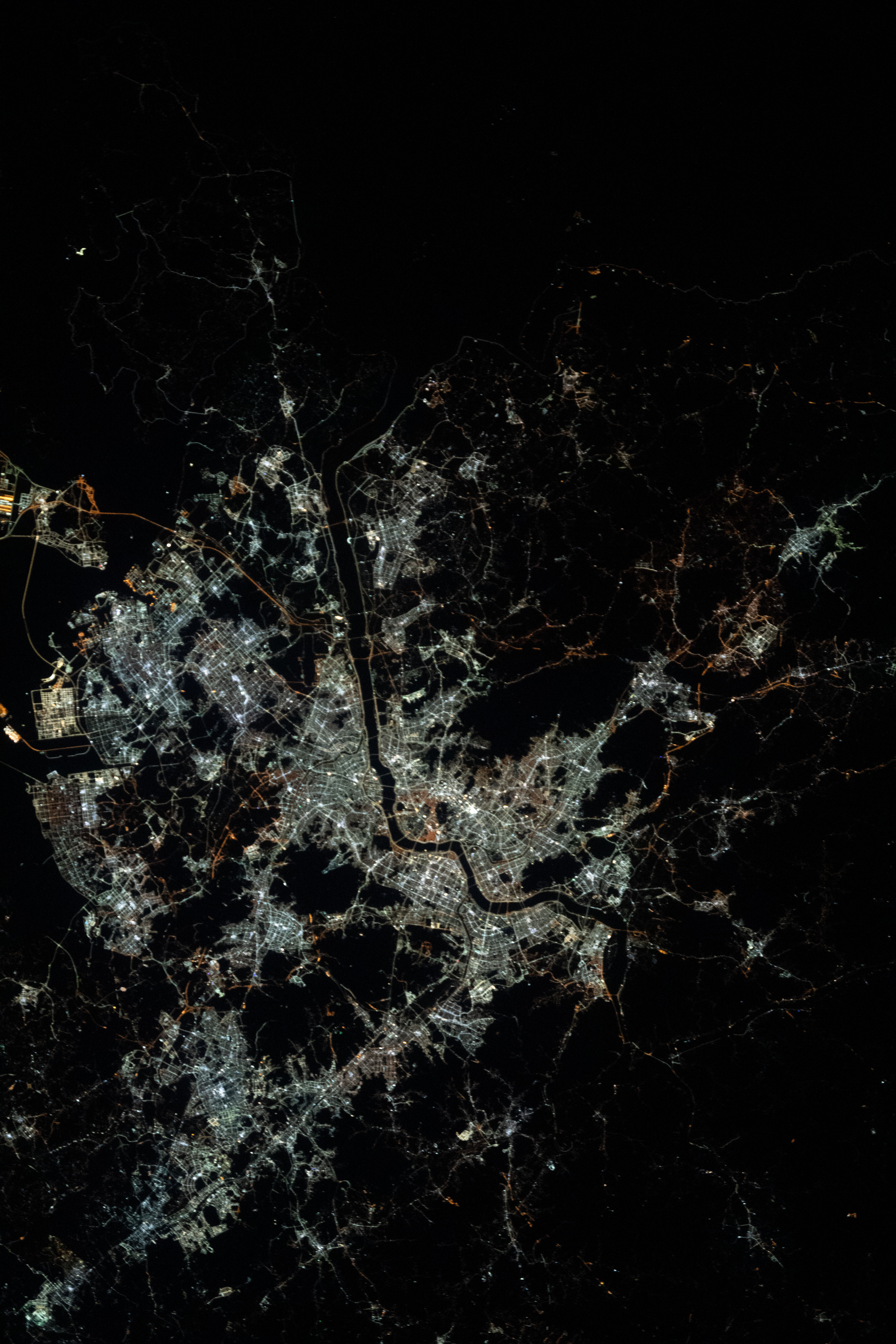
Satellite image of Seoul and greater area (2020)

The metropolitan area occupies a plain in the Han River valley.

== Demographics ==
Historical population
Year	Pop.	±%
1949	4,171,614	—
1960	5,194,167	+24.5%
1970	8,730,148	+68.1%
1980	13,298,241	+52.3%
1990	18,586,128	+39.8%
2000	21,354,490	+14.9%
2010	23,836,272	+11.6%
2020	26,043,325	+9.3%

Covering only about 12% of the country's area, the Seoul Metropolitan Area is home to more than 48.2% of the national population, and is the world's ninth-largest urban area. This percentage has risen steadily since the mid-20th century, and the trend is expected to continue. Currently more than half of the people who move from one region to another are moving to the capital area. In 2020, it was reported that the Seoul Metropolitan Area's population had exceeded 50% of the country's total population, with 25,925,799 people living in the area (50.002% of the total 51,849,861).

== Economy ==
Subdivision	Area (km^{2})	Population	GDP (KRW, trillion)	GDP (US$, billion)
Seoul	605	9,586,195	575.035	421.586
Incheon	1,063	2,945,454	125.592	92.078
Gyeonggi Province	10,184	13,511,676	651.417	477.586
Seoul Metropolitan Area	11,852	26,043,325	1,352.044	991.249

In 2023, the Seoul Metropolitan Area's gross regional domestic product was US$ 1.0 trillion, generating around half of the country's total GDP. It is the fourth-largest urban economy in the world after Tokyo, New York and Los Angeles but ahead of Paris and London. The region hosts headquarters of 59 Forbes Global 2000 companies. As the economy of Seoul Metropolitan Area transformed to knowledge economy from the manufacturing-based economy of the 20th century, there are a number of high-tech business parks in Seoul Metropolitan Area, such as Digital Media City and Pangyo Techno Valley.

The Seoul Metropolitan Area is home to the most affluent and livable cities and apartments in Korea but there are significant discrepancies between cities and districts, particularly between those built in the older and newer generations. Newer areas with more modern and luxurious apartments and infrastructure are more expensive, along with proximity to Gangnam District, the commercial center of the region.

== Government ==
Various agencies have been set up to deal with the intergovernmental problems of the region. Proposals for consolidating some or all of the cities of the capital area into a handful of metropolitan cities have thus far not been implemented.

Development in the area is currently governed by the Capital Region Readjustment Planning Act (수도권정비계획법), first passed in 1982 and last revised in 1996.

== Subdivisions ==
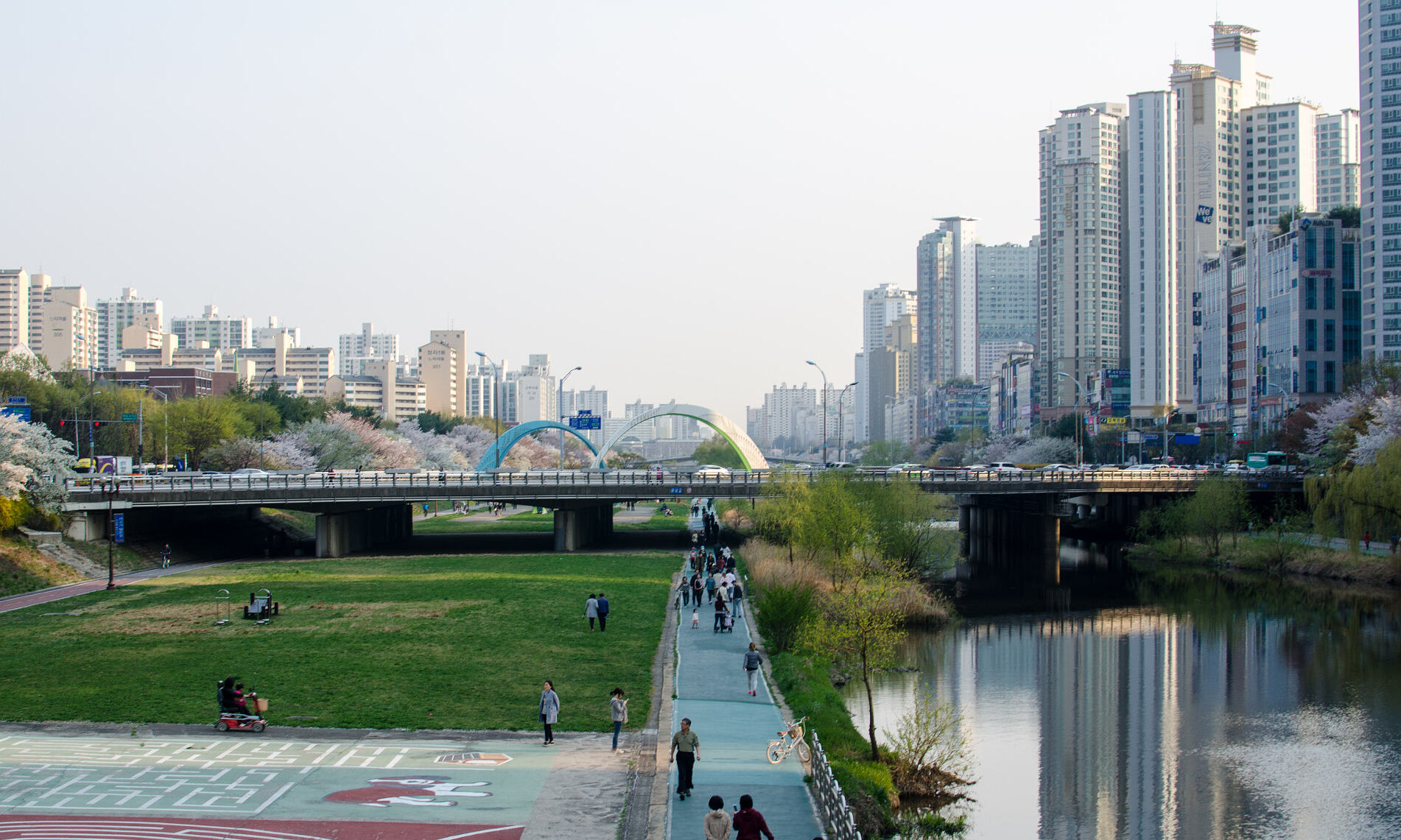
Bundang, Seongnam

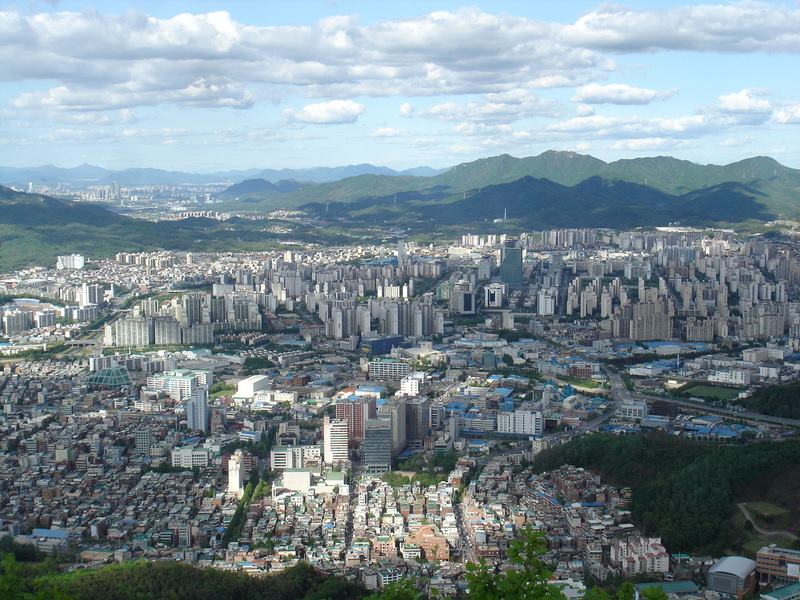
Anyang, Gyeonggi Province

The Seoul Metropolitan Area is divided among the special city of Seoul, the metropolitan city of Incheon, and province of Gyeonggi. Seoul has 25 gu (local government wards), Incheon has 8 gu and 2 counties, and Gyeonggi Province has 28 cities and 3 counties as the subdivisions.

=== Seoul ===
The 25 districts of Seoul.

- Dobong District (도봉구; 道峰區)
- Dongdaemun District (동대문구; 東大門區)
- Dongjak District (동작구; 銅雀區)
- Eunpyeong District (은평구; 恩平區)
- Gangbuk District (강북구; 江北區)
- Gangdong District (강동구; 江東區)
- Gangnam District (강남구; 江南區)
- Gangseo District (강서구; 江西區)
- Geumcheon District (금천구; 衿川區)
- Guro District (구로구; 九老區)
- Gwanak District (관악구; 冠岳區)
- Gwangjin District (광진구; 廣津區)
- Jongno District (종로구; 鍾路區)
- Jung District (중구; 中區)
- Jungnang District (중랑구; 中浪區)
- Mapo District (마포구; 麻浦區)
- Nowon District (노원구; 蘆原區)
- Seocho District (서초구; 瑞草區)
- Seodaemun District (서대문구; 西大門區)
- Seongbuk District (성북구; 城北區)
- Seongdong District (성동구; 城東區)
- Songpa District (송파구; 松坡區)
- Yangcheon District (양천구; 陽川區)
- Yeongdeungpo District (영등포구; 永登浦區)
- Yongsan District (용산구; 龍山區)

=== Incheon ===
The eight districts and two counties of Incheon.

- Bupyeong District (부평구; 富平區)
- Dong District (동구; 東區)
- Gyeyang District (계양구; 桂陽區)
- Jung District (중구; 中區)
- Michuhol District (미추홀구; 彌鄒忽區) (Former Nam District(남구; 南區)
- Namdong District (남동구; 南洞區)
- Seo District (서구; 西區)
- Yeonsu District (연수구; 延壽區)
- Ganghwa County (강화군; 江華郡)
- Ongjin County (옹진군; 甕津郡)

=== Gyeonggi-do ===
There are twenty-eight cities and three counties in Gyeonggi-do. Below are seven of the largest cities, sorted by their population size:

==== Suwon ====
The four gu of Suwon (수원; 水原).

- Paldal-gu (팔달구; 八達區)
- Yeongtong-gu (영통구; 霊通區)
- Jangan-gu (장안구; 長安區)
- Gwonseon-gu (권선구; 勸善區)

==== Goyang ====
The three gu of Goyang (고양; 高陽).

- Deogyang-gu (덕양구; 德陽區)
- Ilsandong-gu (일산동구; 一山東區)
- Ilsanseo-gu (일산서구; 一山西區)

==== Yongin ====
The three gu of Yongin (용인; 龍仁).

- Cheoin-gu (처인구; 處仁區)
- Giheung-gu (기흥구; 器興區)
- Suji-gu (수지구; 水枝區)

==== Seongnam ====
The three gu of Seongnam (성남; 城南).

- Bundang-gu (분당구; 盆唐區)
- Jungwon-gu (중원구; 中原區)
- Sujeong-gu (수정구; 壽井區)

==== Ansan ====
The two gu of Ansan (안산; 安山)

- Danwon-gu (단원구; 檀園區)
- Sangnok-gu (상록구; 常綠區)

==== Anyang ====
The two gu of Anyang (안양; 安養)

- Dongan-gu (동안구; 東安區)
- Manan-gu (만안구; 萬安區)
- Anseong (안성; 安城)
- Dongducheon (동두천; 東豆川)
- Gimpo (김포; 金浦)
- Goyang (고양; 高陽)
- Gunpo (군포; 軍浦)
- Guri (구리; 九里)
- Gwacheon (과천; 果川)
- Gwangju (광주; 廣州)
- Gwangmyeong (광명; 光明)
- Hanam (하남; 河南)
- Hwaseong (화성; 華城)
- Icheon (이천; 利川)
- Namyangju (남양주; 南楊州)
- Osan (오산; 烏山)
- Paju (파주; 坡州)
- Pocheon (포천; 抱川)
- Pyeongtaek (평택; 平澤)
- Siheung (시흥; 始興)
- Uijeongbu (의정부; 議政府)
- Uiwang (의왕; 儀旺)
- Yangju (양주; 楊州)
- Yeoju (여주; 驪州)
- Gapyeong County (가평군; 加平郡)
- Yangpyeong County (양평군; 揚平郡)
- Yeoncheon County (연천군; 漣川郡)

== Transportation ==
The cities of the capital area are tightly interconnected by road and rail. Many of the country's railroad lines, most notably the Gyeongbu Line, terminate in the region. In addition, rapid transit is provided by the Seoul Metropolitan Subway, which has lines that serve all districts of Seoul, as well as the city of Incheon and other surrounding cities within Gyeonggi Province.

The region is a nexus for travel by air and water. The country's two largest airports, Incheon International Airport and Gimpo International Airport, are in the metropolitan area. International and domestic ferries depart from Incheon's ferry terminals several times a day.

Seoul Ring Expressway (Expressway No. 100) connects satellite cities around Seoul.

Incheon International Airport

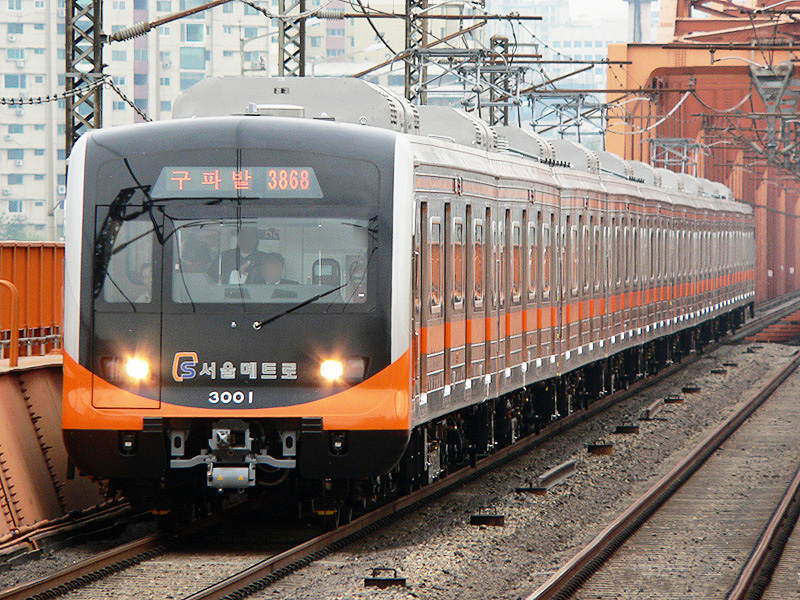
Seoul Metropolitan subway, Line 3

Map of Seoul Ring Expressway

== See also ==
- Administrative divisions of South Korea
- Capital region
- Capital Region First Ring Expressway
- Demographics of South Korea
- Geography of South Korea
- Greater Tokyo Area
- Hanoi Capital Region
- Jing-Jin-Ji
- List of largest cities
- List of metropolitan areas in Asia
- Regions of Korea

== Notes ==
- e나라지표:수도권 인구 집중 현황 (in Korean). Korea National Statistical Office. 2008-07-22.
- Ryu Boseon (류보선) (2005-08-23). 수도권 인구 편중현상 계속 (in Korean). Korea National Statistical Office (KNSO) News. Archived from the original on 2007-09-28.
- Hong, Yong-deok (홍용덕) (2005-06-01). 각종 분산정책 불구하고 수도권은 '인구 블랙홀'. The Hankyoreh (in Korean). Archived from the original on 2012-02-08.
