= Asan Bay =

South Korean bay in the Yellow Sea

Coordinates: 37°04′24″N 126°40′01″E

Asan Bay is a South Korean bay in the Yellow Sea. Named after the city of Asan immediately to its south, it lies at the mouth of several rivers and separates the provinces of Gyeonggi-do and Chungcheongnam-do. The boundary between the bay and the rest of the Yellow Sea is vague, as there are several scattered islands.

== Rivers ==
The rivers which meet the sea at Asan Bay are as follow:

- Jaancheon (at Hwaseong Lake)
- Barancheon (at Namyang Lake)
- Anseongcheon (at Asan Lake)
- Gokgyocheon (at Sapgyo Lake)
- Sapgyocheon (at Sapgyo Lake)
- Namwoncheon (at Sapgyo Lake)
