= Gyeonggi dialect =

Prestige dialect of the Korean language

Gyeonggi
- Seoul
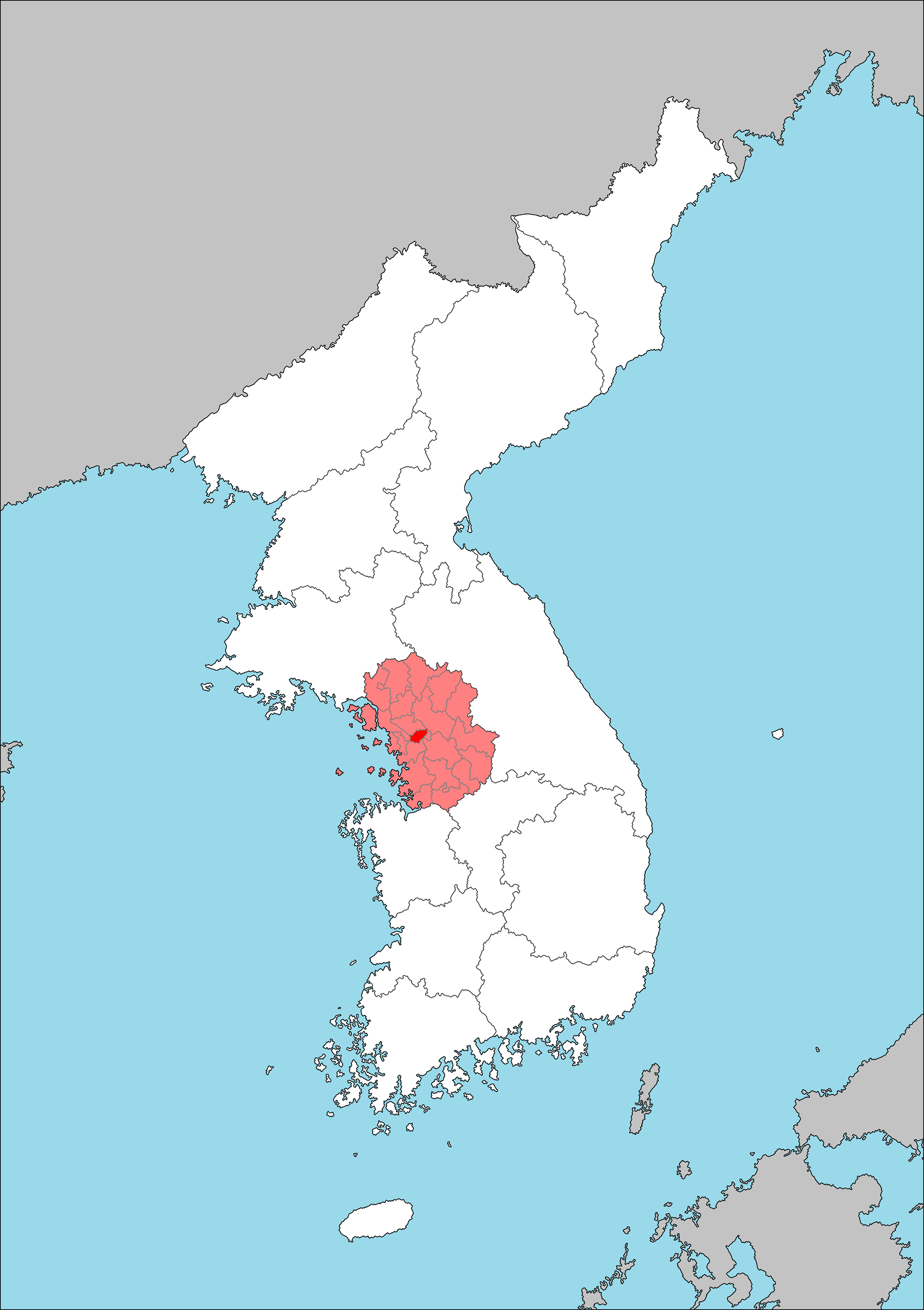
- Native to: South Korea, North Korea
- Region: Seoul National Capital Area (Seoul, Incheon and Gyeonggi Province), Kaesong, Yeongseo
- Language family: Koreanic: Korean; Central; Gyeonggi
- Dialects: Old Seoul dialect; North Gyeonggi dialect; South Gyeonggi dialect; Yeongseo dialect; Kaesŏnɡ dialect

Language codes
- ISO 639-3: –
- Glottolog: seou1239
- IETF: ko-u-sd-kr11

The Gyeonggi dialect (Korean: 경기 방언; RR: Gyeonggi bangeon) or Seoul dialect (서울 방언; Seoul bangeon) of the Korean language is the prestige dialect in South Korea, as well as the basis of the standardized form of the language in the country. It is mainly concentrated in the Seoul National Capital Area, which includes Seoul, Incheon, and Gyeonggi Province. It is also spoken in parts of North Korea, including in Kaesong, as well as among the Korean diaspora.

More recently, Gyeonggi dialect has seen increased use in online contexts, in turn leading to the majority of young Koreans' use of the dialect, regardless of their regional affiliation. The prolific use of online communication channels is expected to lead to a wider adoption of Gyeonggi dialect, in lieu of distinct, regional dialects.

== Pronunciation ==
The vowels for e and ae are merged for young speakers and vowel length is not distinguished consistently, if at all. Among young speakers or in informal contexts, the postpositions -do (-도, 'also'), -ro (-로, 'to') and -go (-고, 'and then') and their derivatives tend to be pronounced with -du (-두), -ru (-루) and -gu (-구). The sentence-final verb ending -yo tends to be pronounced with a schwa, which is sometimes transcribed as -yeo (-여) on the Internet in informal contexts.

Samchon (삼촌; lit. 'uncle') is usually pronounced as samchun (삼춘), as are some other words spelt with 'ㅗ' in standard Korean.

Young Seoul dialect speakers tend to end interrogative sentences (questions) with -nya? (Korean: -냐?). They also use unique intonations slightly different from those used by broadcast news readers. The informal ending -eo (-어) is also used quite commonly in both Seoul dialect questions and sentences.

A 2013 study by Kang Yoon-jung and Han Sung-woo, which compared voice recordings of Seoul speech from 1935 and 2005, found that in recent years, lenis consonants (ㅂㅈㄷㄱ), aspirated consonants (ㅍㅊㅌㅋ) and fortis consonants (ㅃㅉㄸㄲ) were shifting from a distinction via voice onset time to that of pitch change, and suggests that the Seoul dialect is currently undergoing tonogenesis. In 2013, Kim Mi-ryoung notes that these sound shifts still show variations among different speakers, suggesting that the transition is still ongoing. In 2017, Cho Sung-hye examined 141 Seoul dialect speakers, and concluded that these pitch changes were originally initiated by females born in the 1950s, and has almost reached completion in the speech of those born in the 1990s. On the other hand, Choi Ji-youn et al. (2020) disagree with the suggestion that the consonant distinction shifting away from voice onset time is due to the introduction of tonal features, and instead proposes that it is a prosodically conditioned change.

== Variations in accent ==
The Seoul accent can be divided into three variations: conservative, general, and modified. The conservative form is often found in those who have been born or have lived in Seoul before the industrialization in the 1970s (i.e. old natives of Seoul). To some people, this can slightly sound like a North Korean accent. Good examples can be found in speeches of a Seoul-born famous singer, Lee Mun-se. Older broadcast recordings (especially those from the 1980s at least) can also be typical examples of this accent. The accent used in the Daehan News, a government-made film-based news media, may be a humorous version of this accent.

The general form can be found in speeches by nearly all broadcast news anchors these days. This variation may lie in between the conservative and the modified forms. This accent may be used for recordings of Korean language listening comprehension tests to high school students and is considered to be the standard/formal South Korean accent. Hence, news anchors and reporters who have mastered this dialect for their profession are considered to be South Korea's most grammatically/linguistically accurate, precise, and eloquent citizens.

The last variation is usually spoken by younger generations (including teenagers) and lower-class middle-aged people in the Seoul Metropolitan Area. Some middle and upper-class people in Seoul may speak with this accent due to lack of 'rigid' lingual education policies.

This variation has emerged in public since the early 1990s. Even a few young broadcast news anchors may speak with some features of this accent nowadays, especially when they present in entertainment programs rather than radio news. The most notable characteristic of this form is that the pitch goes up at the end of a sentence, which many people who speak with Gyeongsang accents find offensive or irritating. The pitch-up feature is due to influence by migrants from the Jeolla region into Seoul during the industrialization.

=== Geographic subdivisions ===
Traditionally, there was some variation in the speech of Gyeonggi locals from north and south of the Han River. In Northern regions, especially in Kaeseong and Ganghwa County), influence from the Hwanghae/Pyongan dialect can be displayed in the pronunciation of kes (겠) as kas (갔) or the use of vocabulary like muyu (무유; lit. 'radish') and kyun (켠; lit. 'corner, side') instead of mu (무) and pyeon (편). Meanwhile, southern Gyeonggi locals (such as in Pyeongtaek, which historically was once part of Chungcheong Province) were displayed to have some influence from the Chungcheong/Yeongseo dialects by following the umlaut of the Chungcheong dialect in words like gogi (고기) and olmgida (옮기다), which become gwaegi (괴기) and oelmkida (욂기다) or the use of vocabulary like jol (졸) and bau (바우) for buchu (부추) and bawi (바위). Coastal regions (most notably in Incheon, Siheung, Gimpo and southern areas of Ongjin County) can have influence from both regions, due to contact with people from both regions through fishing and trade. However, due to the division of Korea and the mass migration of people from southern provinces during and after the 1970s, this regional difference is now almost nonexistent among most modern day Gyeonggi locals and is only noticeable in the speech of elderly locals of Gyeonggi, with traces of this being displayed among some middle aged Gyeonggi locals (especially those from rural backgrounds or whose families originally came from Gyeonggi Province).

== See also ==
- Dialectology
- Dialects of Korean
- South Korean standard language
