= Climate of Seoul =

Coordinates: 37°34′08″N 126°58′36″E

Seoul

Climate chart (precipitation, max. and min. temperature)
J	F	M	A	M	J	J	A	S	O	N	D
21 2 −6	25 5 −3	47 10 2	65 18 8	106 23 13	133 27 18	395 29 22	364 30 22	169 26 17	52 20 10	53 12 3	22 4 −3
- █ Average max. and min. temperatures in °C
- █ Precipitation totals in mm
- Source: Korea Meteorological Administration
Imperial conversion
J	F	M	A	M	J	J	A	S	O	N	D
0.8 35 21	1 40 26	1.9 51 35	2.5 64 46	4.2 73 56	5.2 81 65	16 83 71	14 85 72	6.7 78 63	2 68 51	2.1 53 38	0.8 40 26
- █ Average max. and min. temperatures in °F
- █ Precipitation totals in inches

Seoul, the capital of South Korea, features a dry-winter humid continental climate (Dwa) in the 0°C isotherm according to the Köppen climate classification. If the -3°C isotherm is used, the climate is a dry-winter humid subtropical climate (Cwa) and there are four highly distinct seasons. In summer, the influence of the North Pacific high-pressure system brings hot, humid weather with temperatures soaring as high as 35 °C (95 °F) on occasion. In winter, the city is topographically influenced by expanding Siberian High-pressure zones and prevailing west winds bring colder air to Korea. The bitterly cold days are commonly known to come in three-day cycles regulated by rising and falling pressure systems. The most pleasant seasons for most people in the city are spring and autumn, when azure skies and comfortable temperatures are typical. Most of Seoul's precipitation falls in the summer period between June and September, from the East Asian monsoon and typhoon seasons.

== Summary ==
Seoul is the capital of the Republic of Korea, with Bukhansan, Dobongsan, Bukaksan, Inwangsan, and Ansan to the north, and Suraksan and Buramsan to the northeast after Dobongsan. Achasan is located in the east of Seoul, Samseongsan and Cheonggyesan are located in the south, and Namsan is located in the center. The west of Seoul is an extension of the coastal plain starting from Incheon, and the altitude gradually increases as it comes to the east. The lowest altitude of Seoul is about 10m, and the altitude of the densely populated area is about 15 to 60m. The Han River flows through the center of Seoul from the east to the West Sea, and Jungnangcheon, Cheonggyecheon, Hongjecheon, Bulgwangcheon, Tancheon, Anyangcheon, and Yangjaecheon, which are tributaries of the Han River, are distributed throughout Seoul.

The average annual temperature is 12.8°C. The coldest month is January with -1.9°C, the hottest month is August with 26.1°C, and the annual temperature difference is very large with 28.0°C.

The average annual precipitation is 1417.9mm, with the lowest precipitation in January at 16.8mm and the highest in July at 414.4mm in July. The sum of precipitation in summer (June, July, and August) is 892.1mm, accounting for about 63% of the annual precipitation, and the ratio of precipitation in summer is very high among the total precipitation. On the other hand, the total precipitation in winter (December, January, and February) is 67.6mm, which is about 5% of the annual precipitation.

The average annual wind speed is 2.3 m/s, and the monthly average wind speed is the lowest at 1.9 m/s in September and the highest at 2.7 m/s in March and April.

The average annual relative humidity is 61.8%, the lowest at 54.6% in February and March, and the highest at 76.2% in July. The average relative humidity in summer is 71.8%, and the relative humidity in spring and winter is 56.3%, which is relatively dry.

The average seasonal observation value is October 28 for the first frost, November 3 for the first ice, and November 20 for the first snow.

== Factors ==
Seoul has a hot and very humid climate during the summer season, with cold and dry weather during the winter season. Spring (although windy) and autumn are mild but short in duration. These seasons are considered the best time to visit Seoul.

- Siberian winds bring frosty weather with sporadic snowfall in the city, which takes the average temperature down from 0 to -10 degrees Celsius.
- Asian Dust is a seasonal meteorological phenomenon that affects much of East Asia including South Korea sporadically during the springtime months. The dust storms also affect wildlife particularly hard, destroying crops, habitat, and toxic metals interfering with reproduction.
- The East Asian monsoon brings heavy precipitation during a short rainy season called jangma, from the end of June through the end of July.
- Typhoon season occurs from July through September. About once each year, a typhoon passes very close to or moves over Korea, causing heavy showers.

== Seasonal climate ==
As a continental climate, Seoul has winter, summer and autumn seasons. The monsoon season and typhoons also occurs in the summer season.

=== Winter ===
The winter in Seoul is controlled by the large Siberian high pressure system (the Asiatic high), which results in predominantly cold, dry north-westerly winds. The influence of the Siberian high leads to significantly colder winter temperatures than would be expected at this latitude. About every 4 to 6 days, a low-pressure trough will move through South Korea, bringing with it cloudiness and light precipitation. The amount of precipitation locally depends mostly on the elevation of the station and the length of time that the air has been over the Yellow Sea. Maximum snowfall occurs over the northwest coast, which is the most exposed to the northwesterly flow, and in the mountain areas. Normally, less than 10 percent of the annual precipitation falls (falls very much) during the winter. Frequently, the weather is cloudless, clear, and dry, except for the southwestern region of the peninsula. The mean January temperature in Seoul is -2.0 °C (28.4 °F). January is the coldest month in Seoul, often with the lowest temperatures, almost always dropping below -10 °C (14 °F), and sometimes below -15 °C (5 °F).

=== Summer ===
During the summer, East Asian monsoon and typhoon winds engulf the city and the warm, moisture laden air moving off the oceans clashes with the drier air to the north. These fronts oscillate back and forth across Korea during the summer months. The interior highlands disturb the winds, forcing them into a westerly/southwesterly direction. The majority of the annual precipitation falls between late June and the middle of September. The East Asian Monsoon rains fully develop along the entire peninsula by mid-June and usually end by mid-July. Seoul receives approximately 126 mm (5 in) of precipitation during the winter (December–March), but in July alone receives approximately 414 mm (16.3 in). July is the wettest month in the metropolis.

Thunderstorms usually occur about 2 to 5 days per month during this period. Summer precipitation in Seoul is as likely to occur at 0200 as at 1400. Humidity is very high and fog will develop whenever a cold air mass confronts this moisture laden air, often forming on cloudless days. The typhoon season occurs from July through September. About once each year, a typhoon will pass very close to or move over Korea, causing heavy showers. Strong winds are usually confined to islands and exposed coastal areas. Although winds might not pose a problem, the associated rainfall can cause significant flash flooding, a very real threat during the rainy season, especially in rough terrain. The mean temperature for Seoul in August is 26.1 °C (79 °F)

=== Autumn ===
October is the transition month between the summer rainy season and the cold, dry winter. The predominantly tropical cloudy weather of the summer is replaced by cooler, drier, and less cloudy conditions. The primary weather producers during October are cold frontal systems from the Asian mainland. On the average, one frontal passage per week can be expected during the month. A typical frontal passage is proceeded by increasing middle and high cloudiness with light rain. Following the frontal passage, mostly clear skies can be expected for 3 or 4 days. During this clear period it is very likely for fog to form. Fog is especially prevalent in river valleys and in low-lying areas.

== Statistics ==
Climate data for Seoul (1991–2020 normals, extremes 1907–present)
Month	Jan	Feb	Mar	Apr	May	Jun	Jul	Aug	Sep	Oct	Nov	Dec	Year
Record high °C (°F)	14.4 (57.9)	18.7 (65.7)	25.1 (77.2)	29.8 (85.6)	34.4 (93.9)	37.2 (99.0)	38.4 (101.1)	39.6 (103.3)	35.1 (95.2)	30.1 (86.2)	25.9 (78.6)	17.7 (63.9)	39.6 (103.3)
Mean maximum °C (°F)	9.2 (48.6)	13.3 (55.9)	19.2 (66.6)	25.6 (78.1)	30.2 (86.4)	32.5 (90.5)	33.7 (92.7)	34.7 (94.5)	30.9 (87.6)	26.1 (79.0)	19.7 (67.5)	11.9 (53.4)	35.1 (95.2)
Mean daily maximum °C (°F)	2.1 (35.8)	5.1 (41.2)	11.0 (51.8)	17.9 (64.2)	23.6 (74.5)	27.6 (81.7)	29.0 (84.2)	30.0 (86.0)	26.2 (79.2)	20.2 (68.4)	11.9 (53.4)	4.2 (39.6)	17.4 (63.3)
Daily mean °C (°F)	−2.0 (28.4)	0.7 (33.3)	6.1 (43.0)	12.6 (54.7)	18.2 (64.8)	22.7 (72.9)	25.3 (77.5)	26.1 (79.0)	21.7 (71.1)	15.0 (59.0)	7.5 (45.5)	0.2 (32.4)	12.8 (55.0)
Mean daily minimum °C (°F)	−5.5 (22.1)	−3.2 (26.2)	1.9 (35.4)	8.0 (46.4)	13.5 (56.3)	18.7 (65.7)	22.3 (72.1)	22.9 (73.2)	17.7 (63.9)	10.6 (51.1)	3.5 (38.3)	−3.4 (25.9)	8.9 (48.0)
Mean minimum °C (°F)	−12.7 (9.1)	−10.7 (12.7)	−4.9 (23.2)	2.1 (35.8)	8.7 (47.7)	14.5 (58.1)	18.9 (66.0)	18.4 (65.1)	12.1 (53.8)	3.1 (37.6)	−4.7 (23.5)	−11.2 (11.8)	−13.9 (7.0)
Record low °C (°F)	−22.5 (−8.5)	−19.6 (−3.3)	−14.1 (6.6)	−4.3 (24.3)	2.4 (36.3)	8.8 (47.8)	12.9 (55.2)	13.5 (56.3)	3.2 (37.8)	−5.1 (22.8)	−11.9 (10.6)	−23.1 (−9.6)	−23.1 (−9.6)
Average precipitation mm (inches)	16.8 (0.66)	28.2 (1.11)	36.9 (1.45)	72.9 (2.87)	103.6 (4.08)	129.5 (5.10)	414.4 (16.31)	348.2 (13.71)	141.5 (5.57)	52.2 (2.06)	51.1 (2.01)	22.6 (0.89)	1,417.9 (55.82)
Average precipitation days (≥ 1 mm)	3.3	3.4	4.7	6.5	6.8	7.6	13.3	11.8	6.5	4.8	6.4	4.2	79.3
Average snowy days	7.1	5.1	2.8	0.2	0.0	0.0	0.0	0.0	0.0	0.0	2.3	6.4	23.9
Average relative humidity (%)	56.2	54.6	54.6	54.8	59.7	65.7	76.2	73.5	66.4	61.8	60.4	57.8	61.8
Mean monthly sunshine hours	169.6	170.8	198.2	206.3	223.0	189.1	123.6	156.1	179.7	206.5	157.3	162.9	2,143.1
Percentage possible sunshine	52.3	53.6	51.0	51.9	48.4	41.2	26.8	36.2	47.2	57.1	50.2	51.1	46.4
Average ultraviolet index	2	3	5	7	8	9	10	9	7	4	3	2	6
Source 1: Korea Meteorological Administration (percent sunshine 1981–2010)
Source 2: Weather Atlas (UV), Meteo Climat (record highs and lows)

== See also ==
- Geography of South Korea
- Seoul
