= List of mountains in Seoul =

Mountains in Seoul, South Korea

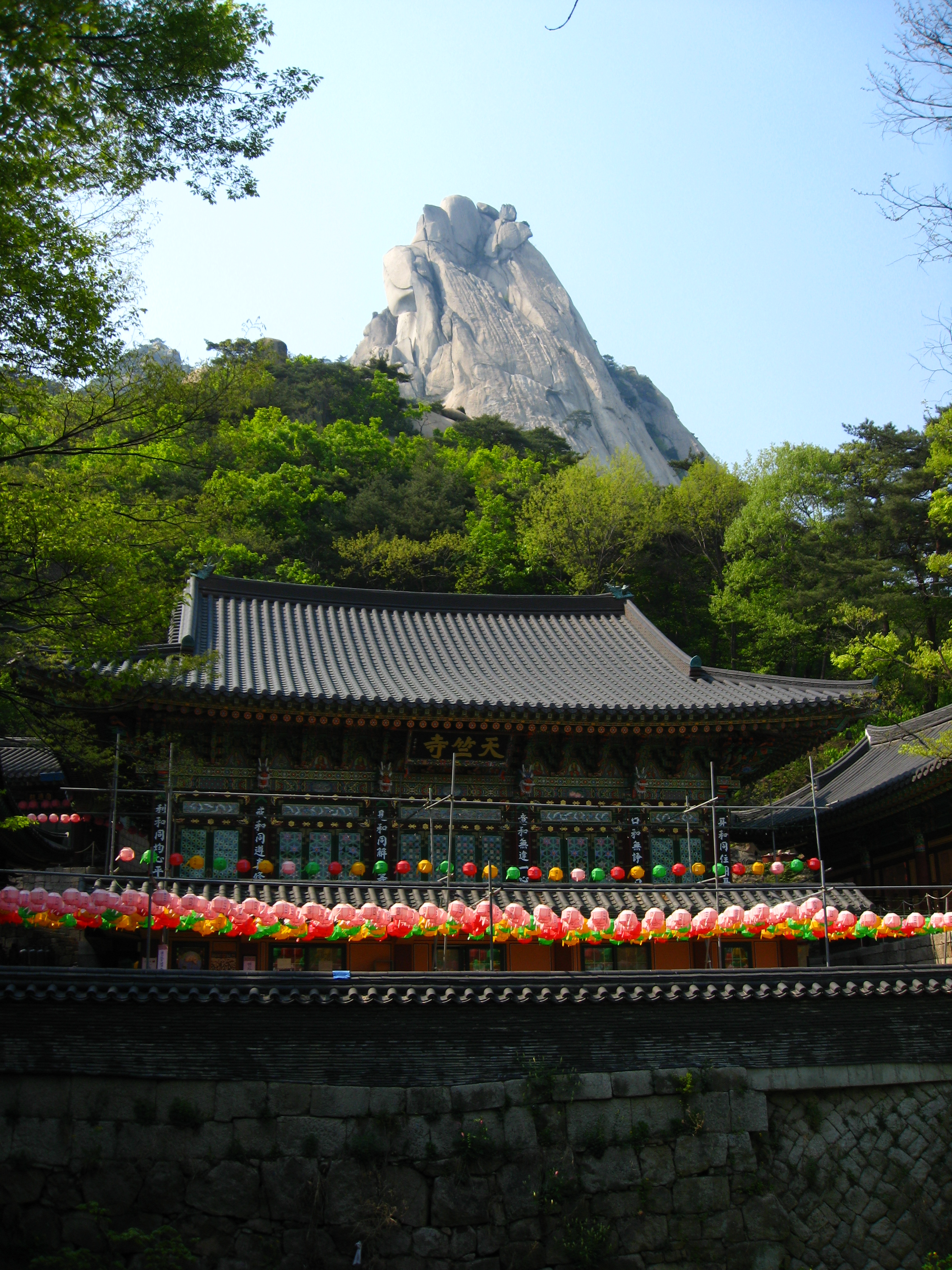
Cheonchuksa located in Dobongsan, one of mountains in Bukhansan National Park.

This is a list of the mountains in Seoul, South Korea.

Mountain	Hangul	Hanja	Height	Location
Achasan	아차산	峨嵯山	287m	Seoul Jungnang District, Guri in Gyeonggi Province
Aengbongsan	앵봉산		m	
Ansan	안산	鞍山	295.9m	Seodaemun District
Baebongsan	배봉산	拜峰山	105.7m	Jeonnong-dong, Huigyeong-dong
Baengnyeonsan	백련산	白蓮山	215.5m	Eunpyeong District, Seodaemun District
Baekundae	백운대	白雲臺	836m	Gangbuk District, Seoul and Goyang, Gyeonggi Province
Bonghwasan	봉화산	烽火山	137.9m	Sinnae-dong, Muk-dong, Junghwa-dong, Sangbong-dong of Jungnang District
Bugaksan	북악산	北岳山	342m	North of Gyeongbokgung
Bukhansan	북한산	北漢山	836.5m	Dobong District, Eunpyeong District, Jongno District, Seoul and Uijeongbu, Goyang, Yangju-gun in Gyeonggi Province
Buramsan	불암산	佛岩山	508m	Nowon District in Seoul and Namyangju in Gyeonggi Province
Cheonmasan	천마산	天摩山	144.4m	Macheon-dong, Songpa District, Seoul and Hanam, Gyeonggi Province
Cheonggyesan	청계산	淸溪山	618m	Seocho District, Seoul and Gwacheon, Uiwang, Seongnam in Gyeonggi Province
Choansan	초안산		m	
Daehyeonsan	대현산		m	Geumho 1ga-dong, Seongdong District
Daemosan	대모산	大母山	293m	Gaepo-dong, Gangnam District
Dobongsan	도봉산	道峰山	739.5m	Dobong District of Seoul and Yangju-gun, Uijeongbu in Gyeonggi Province
Eungbongsan	응봉산	鷹峰山	81m	Eungbong-dong, Seongdong District
Gaehwasan	개화산	開花山	132m	Gangseo-gu
Gaeungsan	개웅산	開雄山	125m	Guro District
Gaeunsan	개운산	開運山	575m	Seongbuk District
Geumhosan	금호산		m	Seongdong District, Jung-gu
Gohwangsan	고황산	高凰山	150m	Seongbuk District, Dongdaemun District
Guryongsan (Seoul)	구룡산	九龍山	283.2m	Gangnam District
Gwanaksan	관악산	冠岳山	632m	Gwanak District in Seoul and Siheung, Gwacheon, and Anyang in Gyeonggi Province
Hoamsan	호암산		390m	West part of Gwanaksan
Inneungsan	인릉산		293m	Seocho District, Seoul and Gwacheon in Gyeonggi Province
Iljasan	일자산		m	
Insubong	인수봉	仁壽峰	804m	Dobong District
Inwangsan	인왕산	仁王山	338.2m	Seoul Seodaemun District
Jiyangsan	지양산	地陽山	m	Sinwol-dong in Yangcheon District
Maebongsan	매봉산		m	Yongsan District, Jung-gu, Seongdong District
Mangyeongsan	만경대	萬景臺	800m	Dobong District, Seoul and Goyang, Gyeonggi Province
Naksan	낙산	駱山	125m	Jongno District, Dongdaemun District, Seongbuk District
Namhansan	남한산	南漢山	460m	Part of the mountain lies in Macheon-dong, Songpa District, Seoul and Jungbu-myeon, Gwangju-gun, Gyeonggi Province
Namsan	남산	南山	262m	Jung-gu, Yongsan District
Nogosan	노고산		106m	back of Sogang University
Opaesan	오패산		m	
Samseongsan	삼성산	三聖山	480.9m	Gwanak District, Guro District, Seoul and Anyang in Gyeonggi Province
Sinjeongsan	신정산		m	
Suraksan	수락산	水落山	638m	Nowon District, Seoul, in Gyeonggi Province, Uijeongbu, Namyangju
Ujangsan	우장산		98.9m	Hwagok-dong 5, 6 and, Balsan-dong
Umyeonsan	우면산	牛眠山	293m	Seocho District, Seoul and Gwacheon in Gyeonggi Province
Yongmabong	용마봉	龍馬峰	348 m (1,142 ft)	Guui-dong, Junggok-dong in Gwangjin District

== See also ==
- List of mountains in Korea
- Lists of mountains by region
