= Cheonggyesan =

Cheonggyesan (청계산; 淸溪山) is the name of several mountains in South Korea:

- Cheonggyesan (Gwacheon/Seongnam) is in Seoul and several cities in Gyeonggi-do
- Cheonggyesan (North Gyeongsang) is in the city of Sangju, Gyeongsangbuk-do
- Cheonggyesan (Yangpyeong) is in Yangpyeong County, Gyeonggi-do
- Cheonggyesan (Pocheon/Gapyeong) is in the city of Pocheon and Gapyeong County, Gyeonggi-do
