= Gwimokbong =

Mountain in South Korea

Highest point
- Elevation: 1,036 m (3,399 ft)

Geography
- Location: South Korea

Korean name
- Hangul: 귀목봉
- Hanja: 鬼木峰
- RR: Gwimokbong
- MR: Kwimokpong

Gwimokbong (Korean: 귀목봉) is a mountain in Gapyeong County, Gyeonggi Province in South Korea. It rests between the peaks of Cheonggyesan and Myeongjisan. Gwimokbong has an elevation of 1,036 m (3,399 ft).

== See also ==
- List of mountains in Korea
