= Samseongsan =

Samseongsan (Korean: 삼성산; Hanja: 三聖山) is the name of two mountains in South Korea:

- Samseongsan (North Gyeongsang)
- Samseongsan (Gyeonggi/Seoul)
