= Yongmabong =

Mountain in Seoul, South Korea

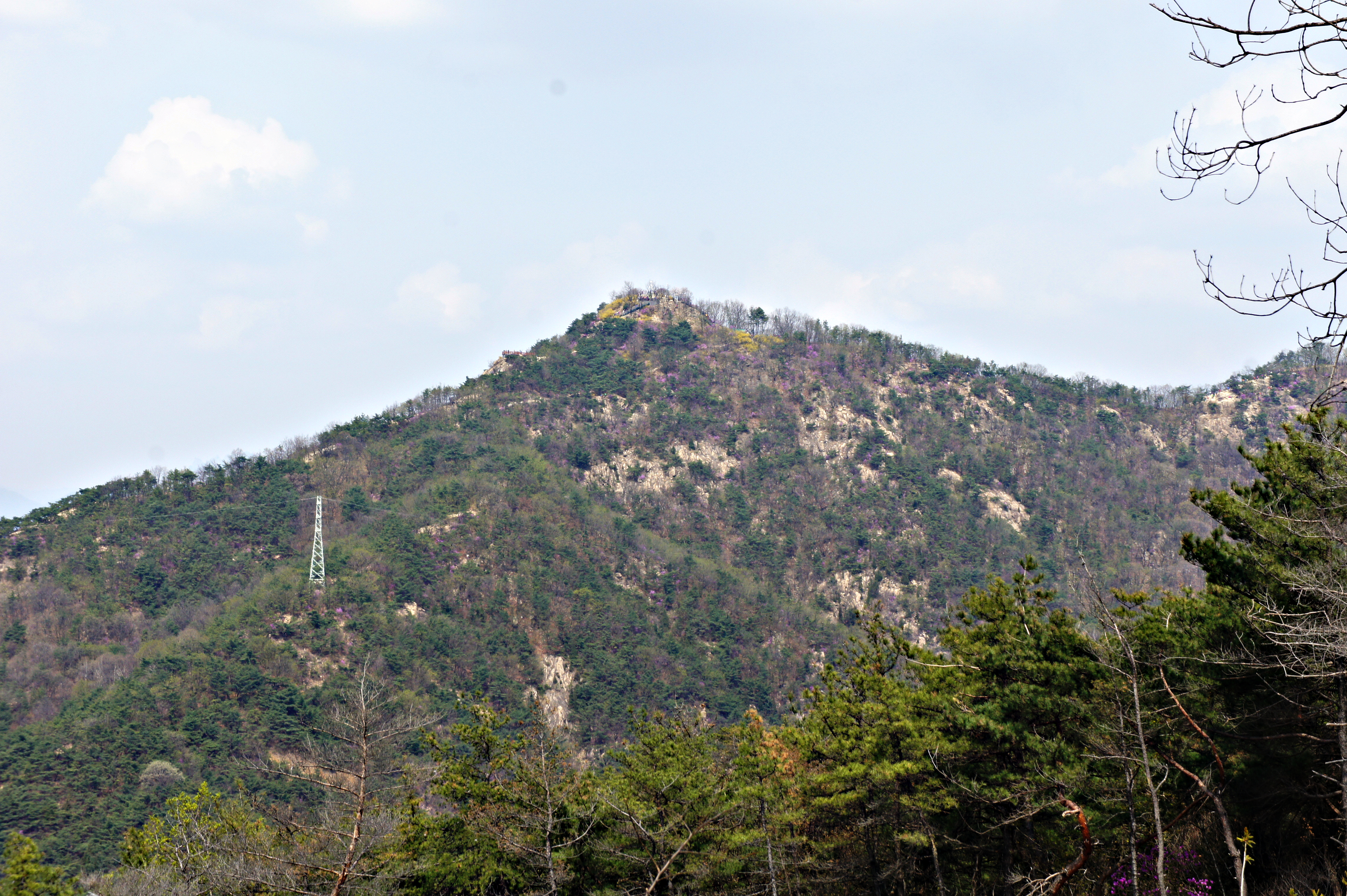

Highest point
- Elevation: 348 m (1,142 ft)
- Coordinates: 37.57128°N 127.09611°E

Geography
- Location: Seoul, South Korea

Climbing
- Easiest route: Yongmasan Station

Korean name
- Hangul: 용마봉
- Hanja: 龍馬峰
- RR: Yongmabong
- MR: Yongmabong

Yongmabong (Korean: 용마봉) is a mountain in Seoul, South Korea. It extends across Guui-dong and Junggok-dong in Gwangjin District. It has an elevation of 348 m (1,142 ft).

== See also ==
- List of mountains in Seoul
- List of mountains in Korea
