= Jiyangsan =

Mountain in Seoul, South Korea

Highest point
- Coordinates: 37°31′12″N 126°49′32″E

Korean name
- Hangul: 지양산
- Hanja: 芝陽山
- RR: Jiyangsan
- MR: Chiyangsan

Jiyangsan (Korean: 지양산) is a mountain in Sinwol-dong, Yangcheon District, Seoul, South Korea. The wooded trail on the mountain is listed as one of Seoul's "110 favorable walking locations" by the Seoul Metropolitan Government.

Roughly 300 different species of trees and plants can be found on the mountain; the most common is Pinus rigida. The highest point on Mount Jiyang is known as Gukgibong (국기봉; 國旗峰, "Flag Summit").

== See also ==
- List of mountains in Seoul
