= Kim Hak-bong =

Kim Hak-bong may refer to:

- Kim Hak-bong (weightlifter)
- Kim Hak-bong (murderer)
