= Cheonggyesa =

Buddhist temple in Uiwang, South Korea

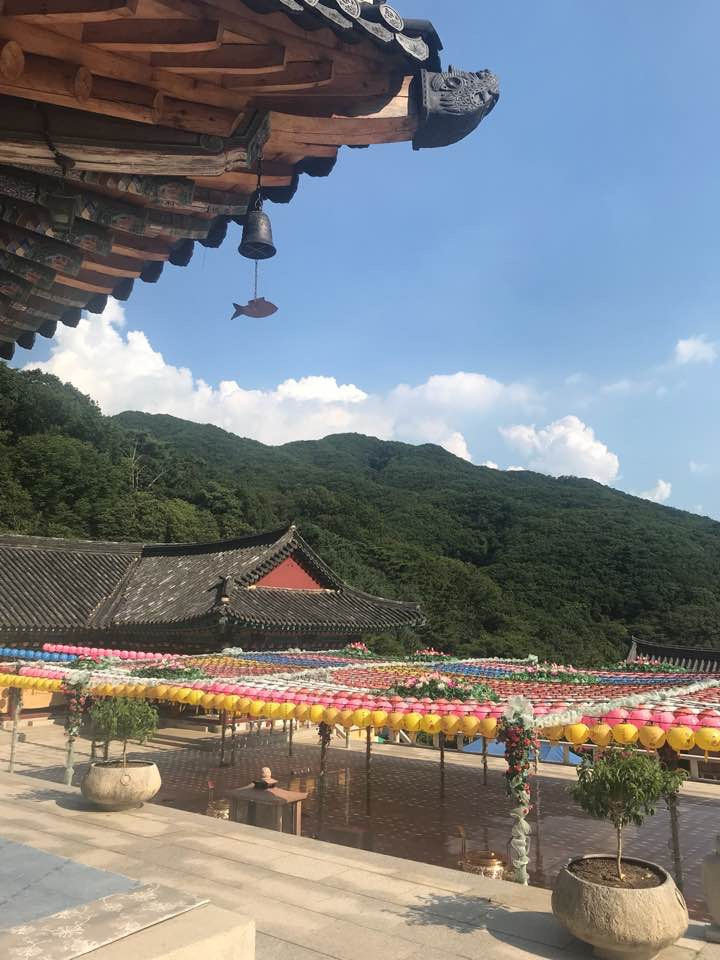
- Cheonggyesa Temple

- Location within South Korea

Religion
- Affiliation: Buddhism
- Sect: Jogye Order
- District: Cheonggyesan (Seoul/Gyeonggi)

Location
- State: Uiwang
- Country: South Korea
- Coordinates: 37°24′43″N 127°02′06″E

Korean name
- Hangul: 청계사
- Hanja: 淸溪寺
- RR: Cheonggyesa
- MR: Ch'ŏnggyesa

Cheonggyesa (Korean: 청계사; Hanja: 淸溪寺) is a temple of the Jogye Order of Korean Buddhism in Uiwang, Cheonggyesan (Seoul/Gyeonggi). The temple was first built in Silla Kingdom era.

== Transportation ==
Cheonggyesa is located 11 Cheonggye-dong, Uiwang-si, Gyeonggi Province. The nearest subway station is Indeogwon Station (Station #440 on Line 4). From the Indeogwon Station, it takes around 10 minutes to the temple by a taxi.

== Temple Stay ==
Cheonggyesa also offers Temple Stay programs where visitors can experience Buddhist culture.

== Gallery ==
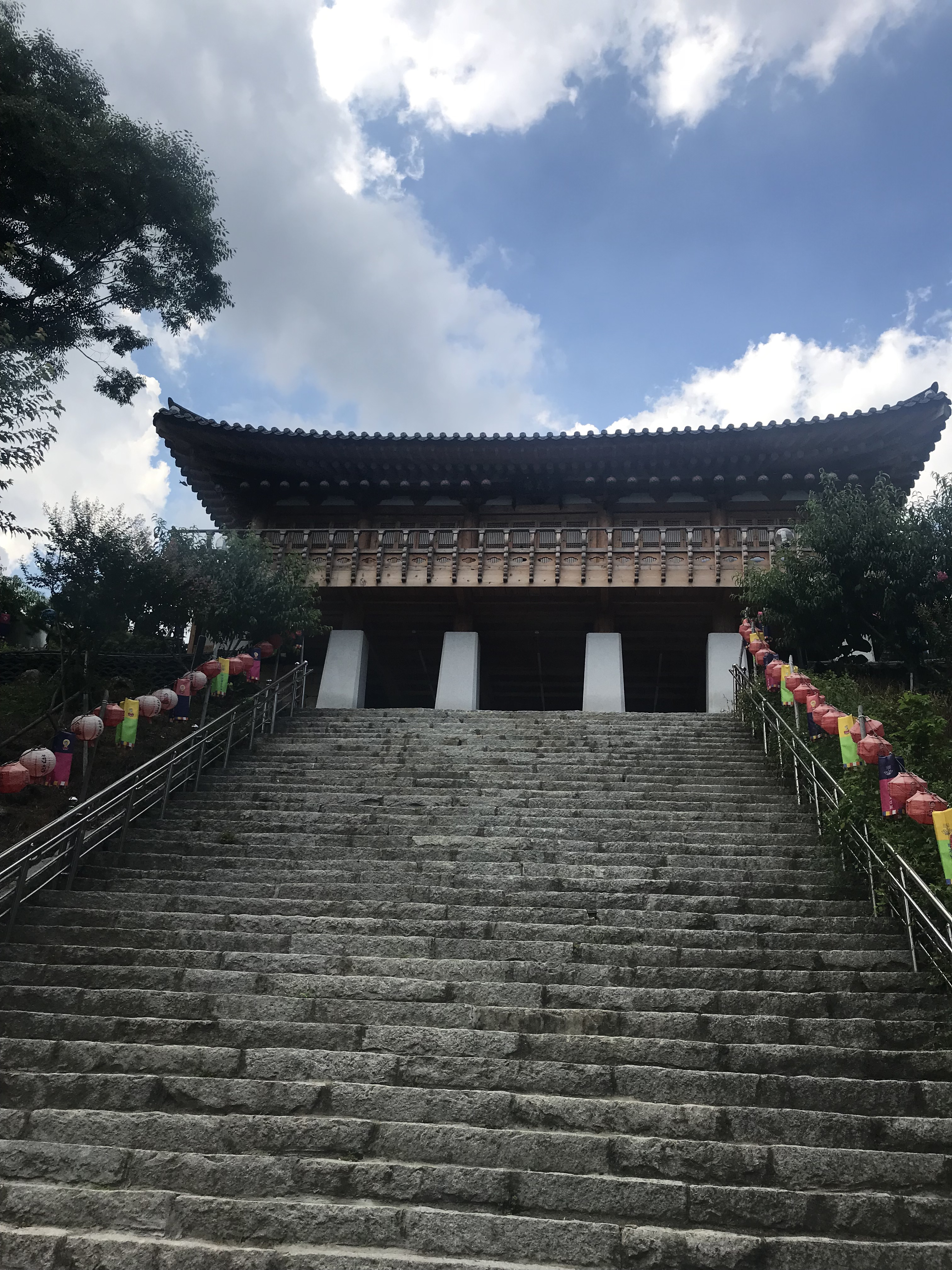
Cheonggyesa Temple

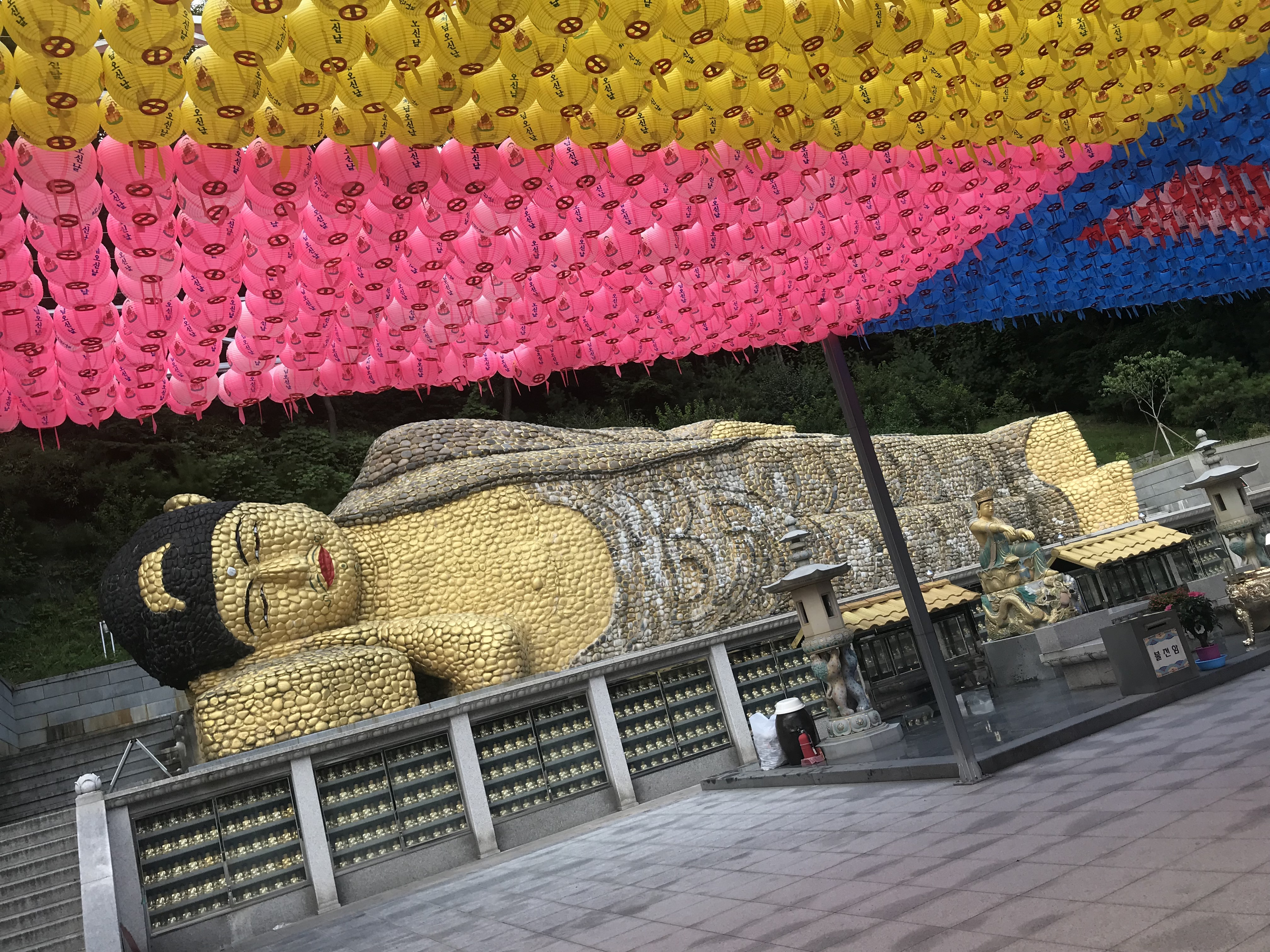
Cheonggyesa Temple

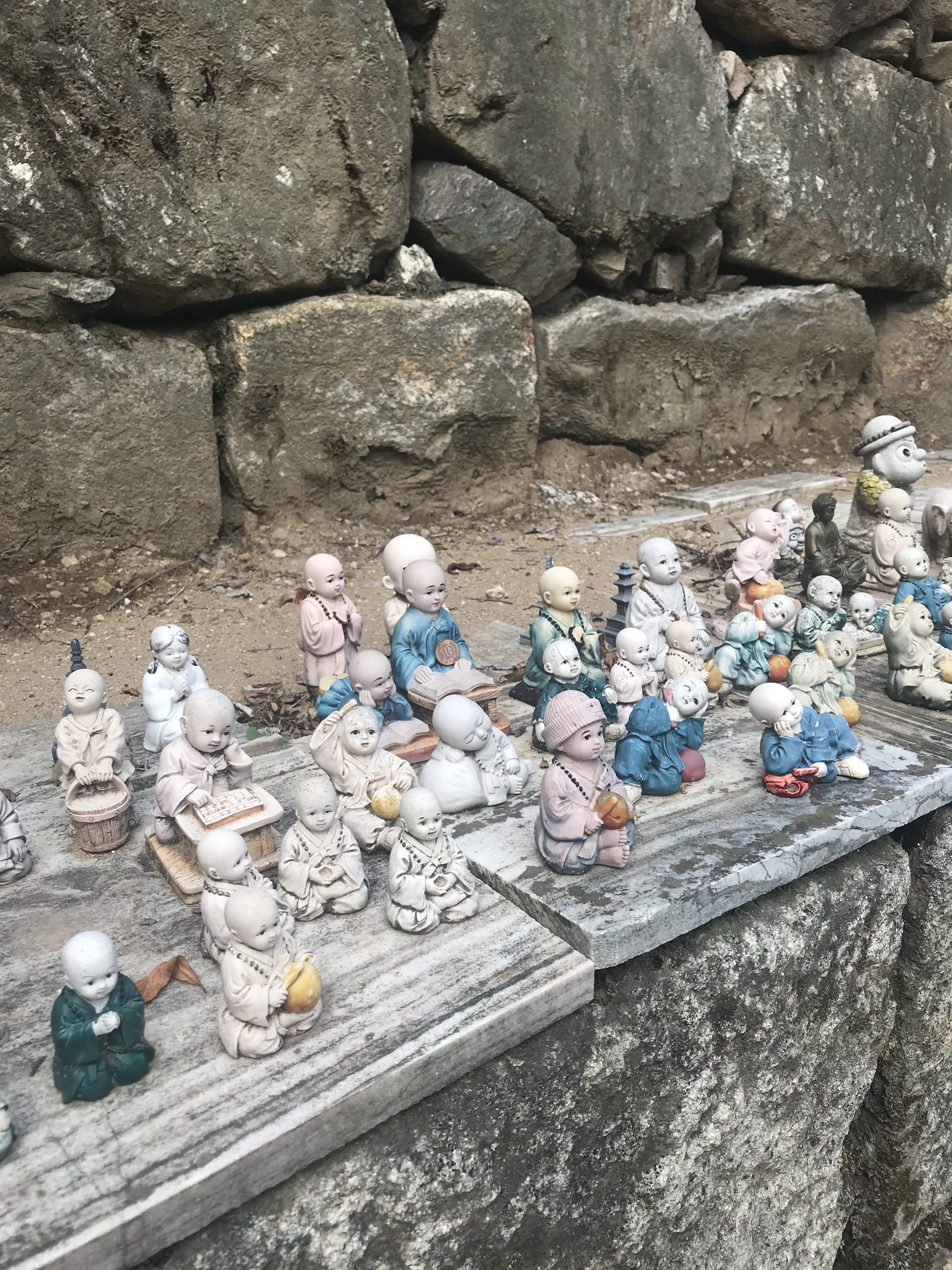
Cheonggyesa Temple

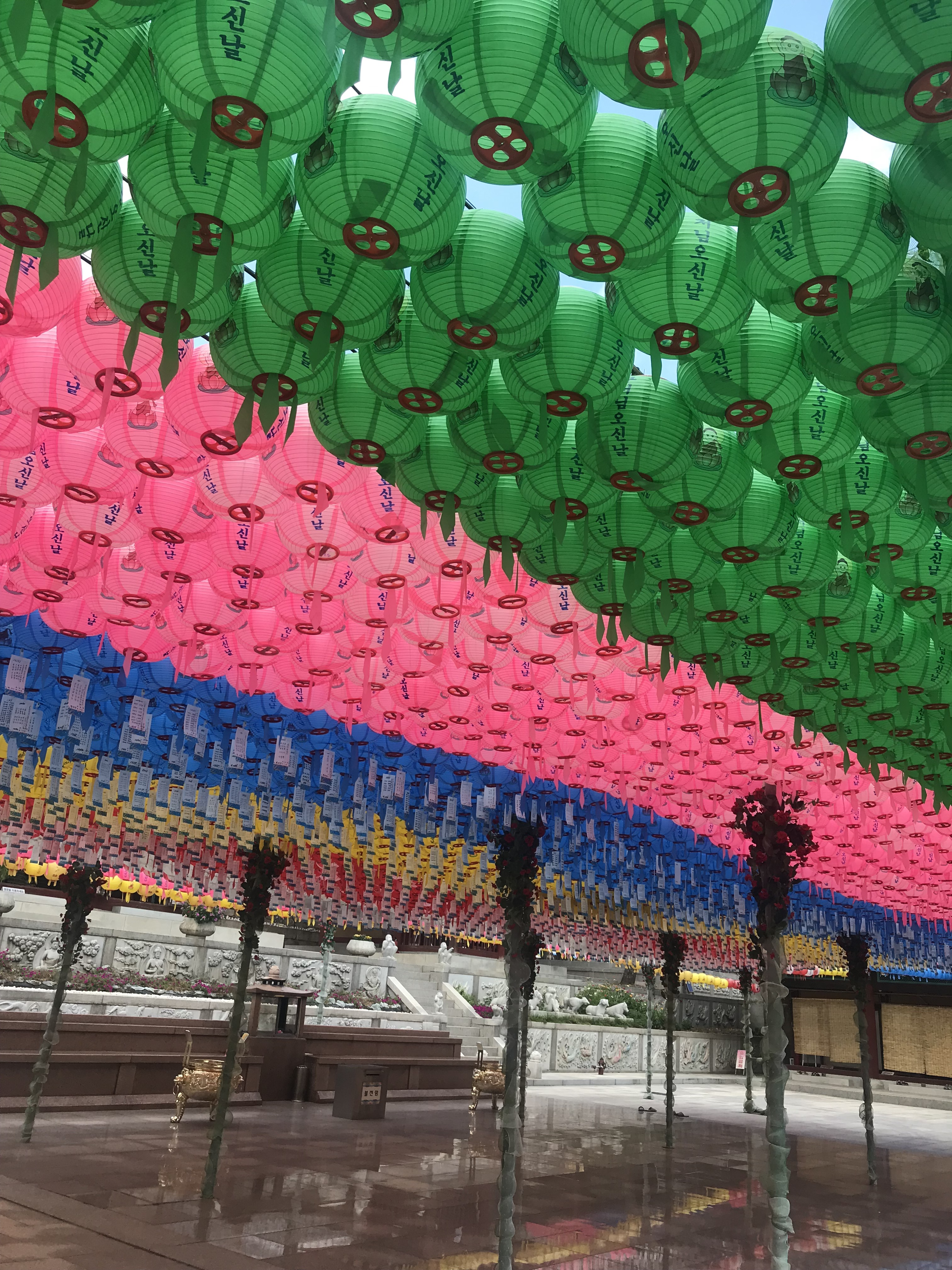
Cheonggyesa Temple

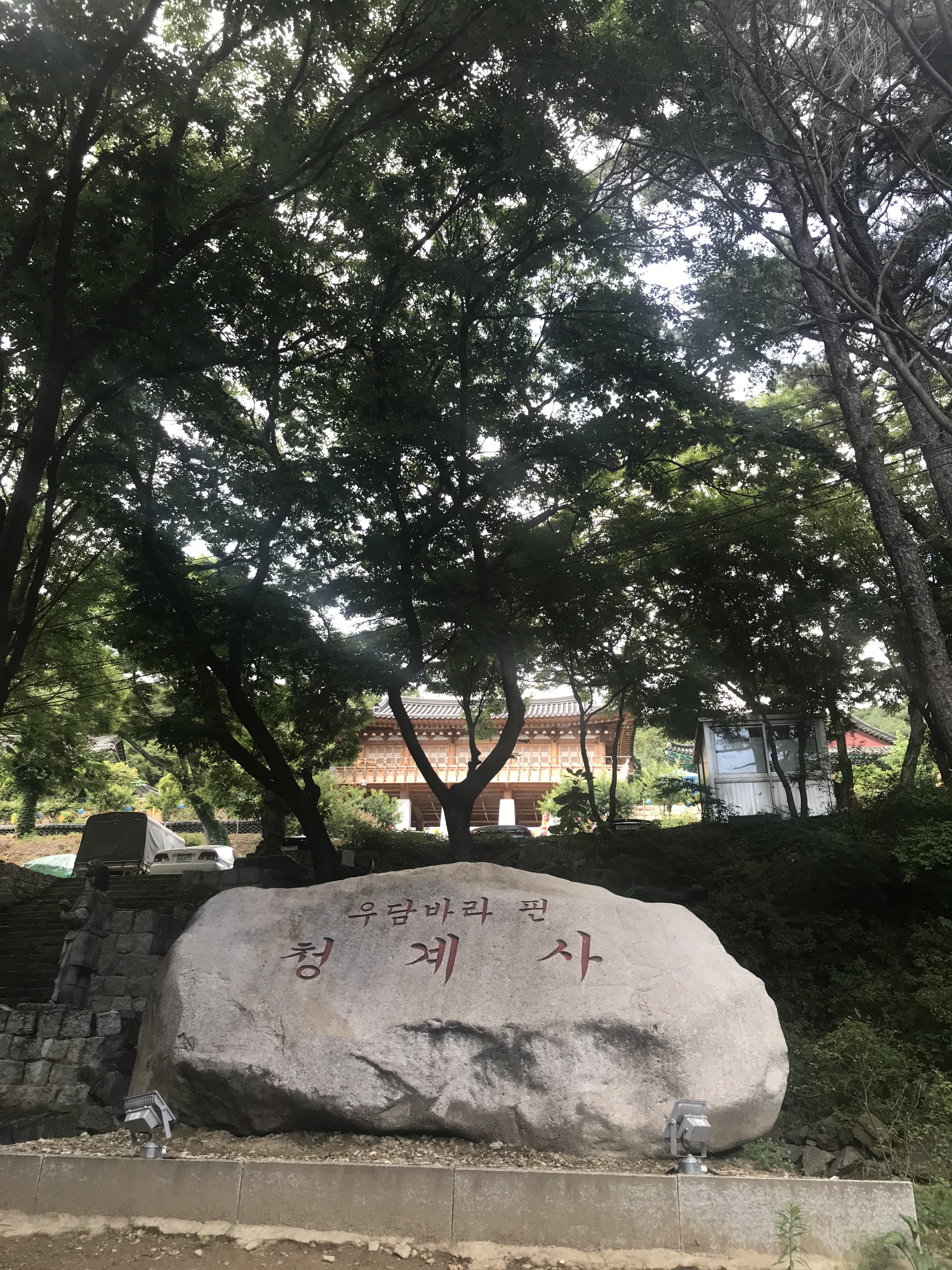
Cheonggyesa Temple

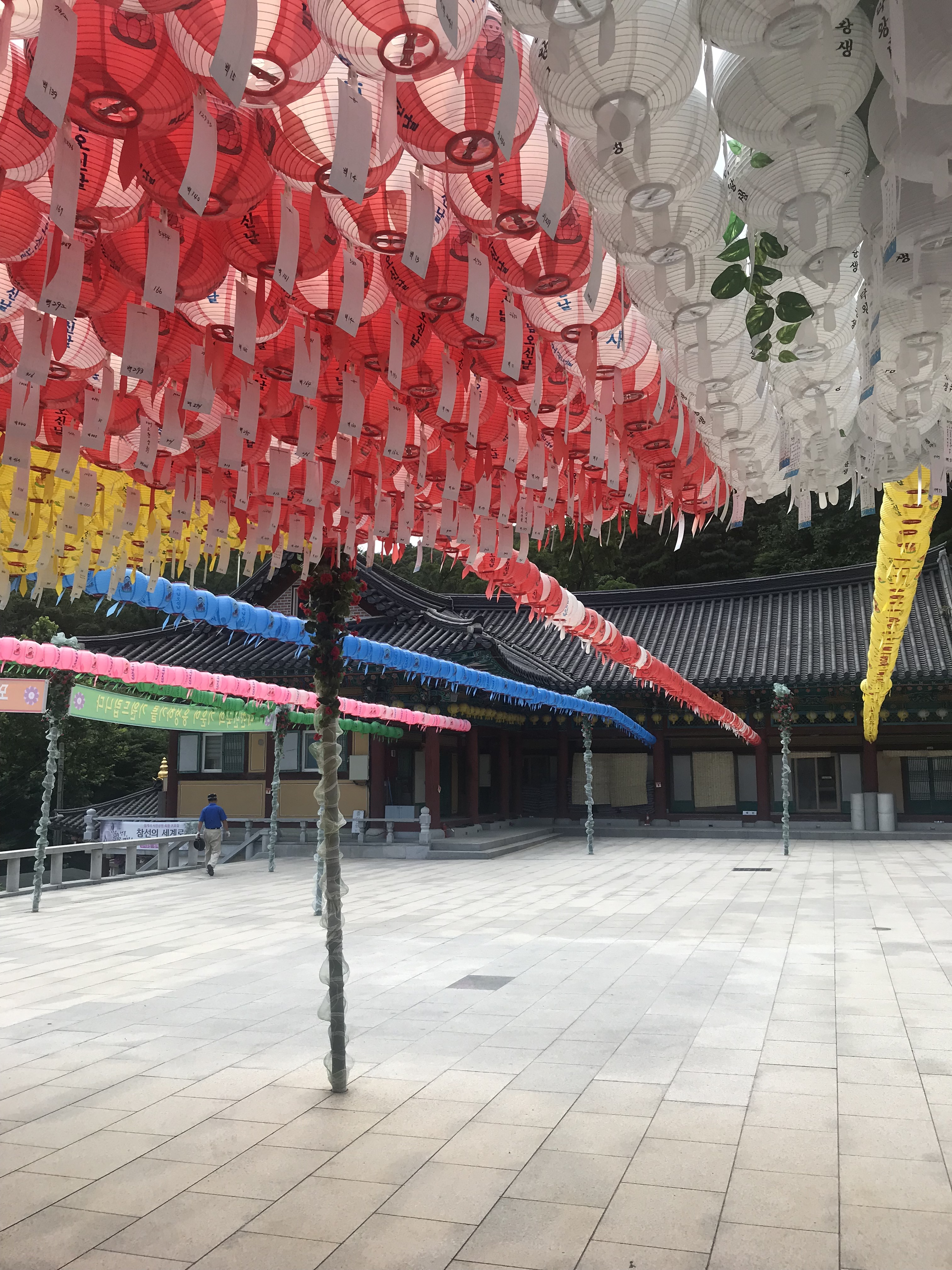
Cheonggyesa Temple

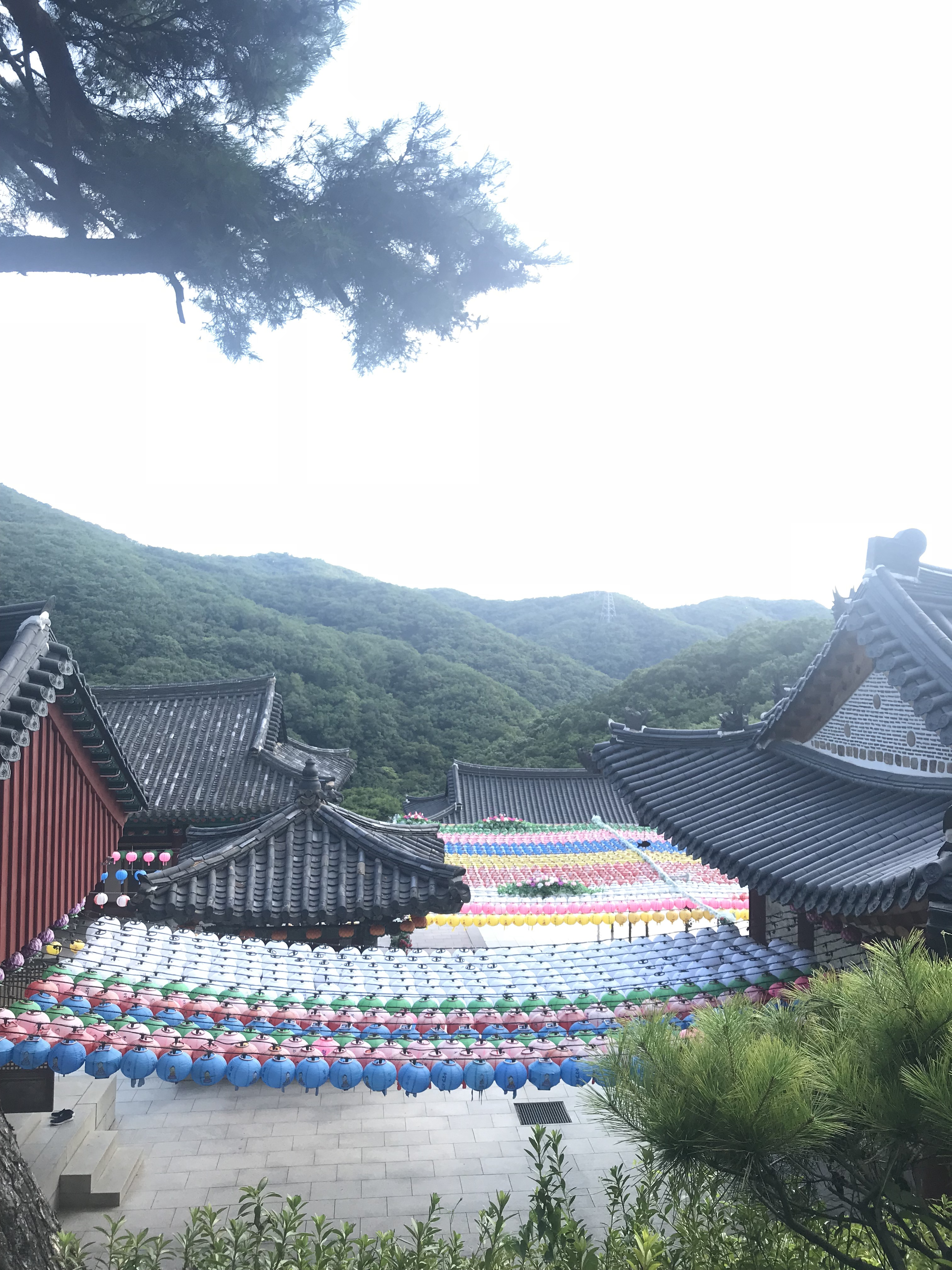
Cheonggyesa Temple

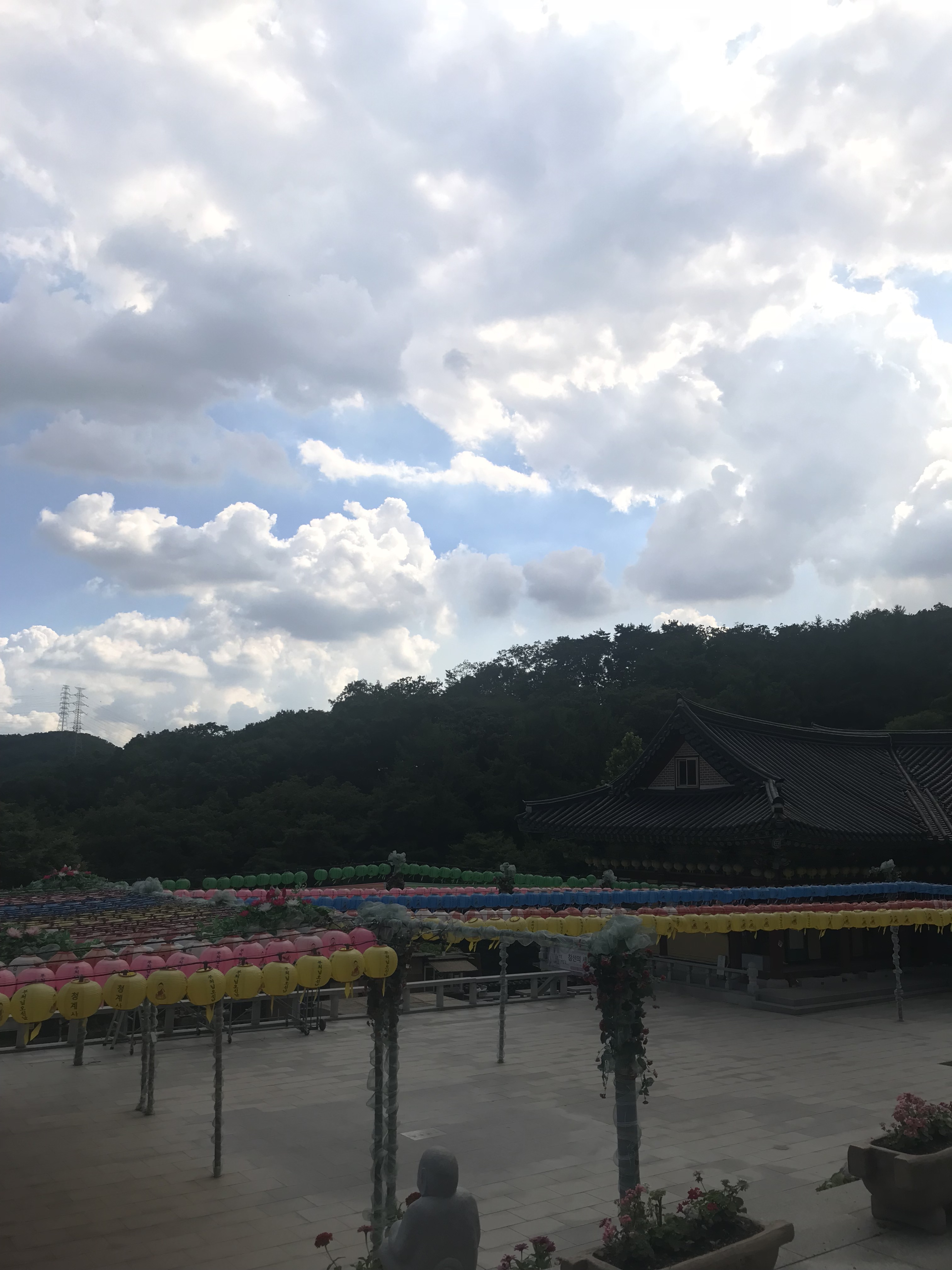
Cheonggyesa Temple

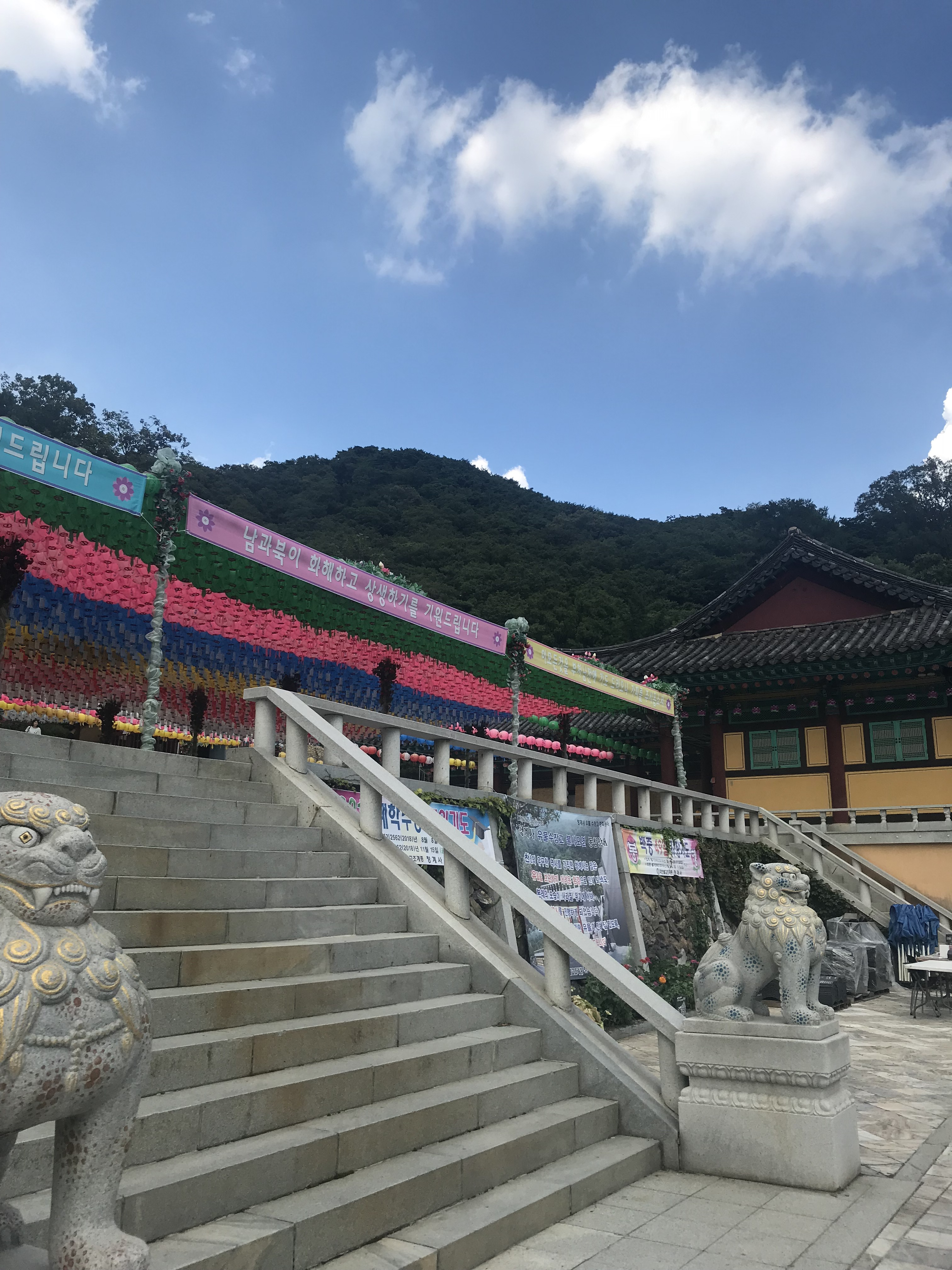
Cheonggyesa Temple

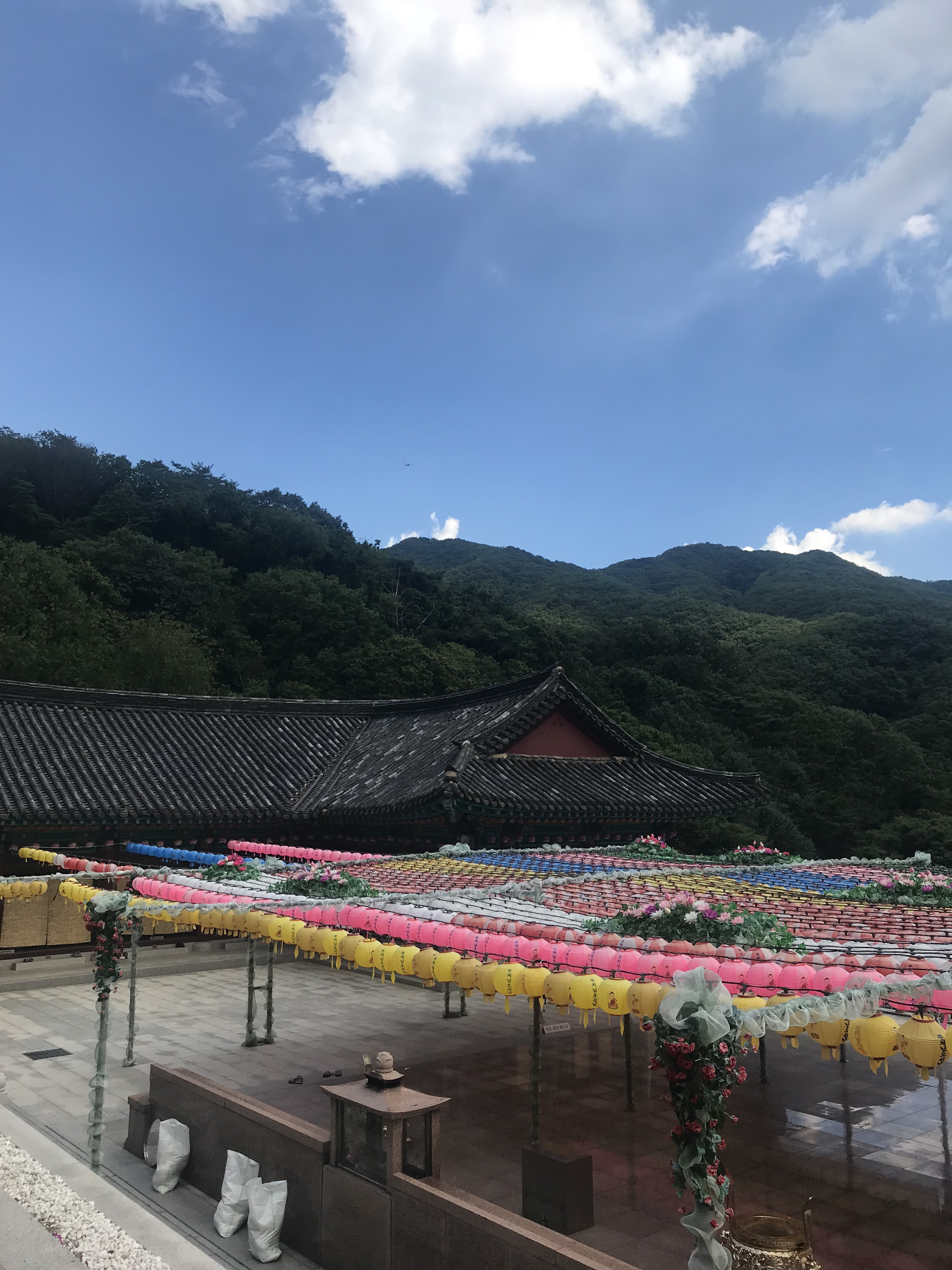
Cheonggyesa Temple

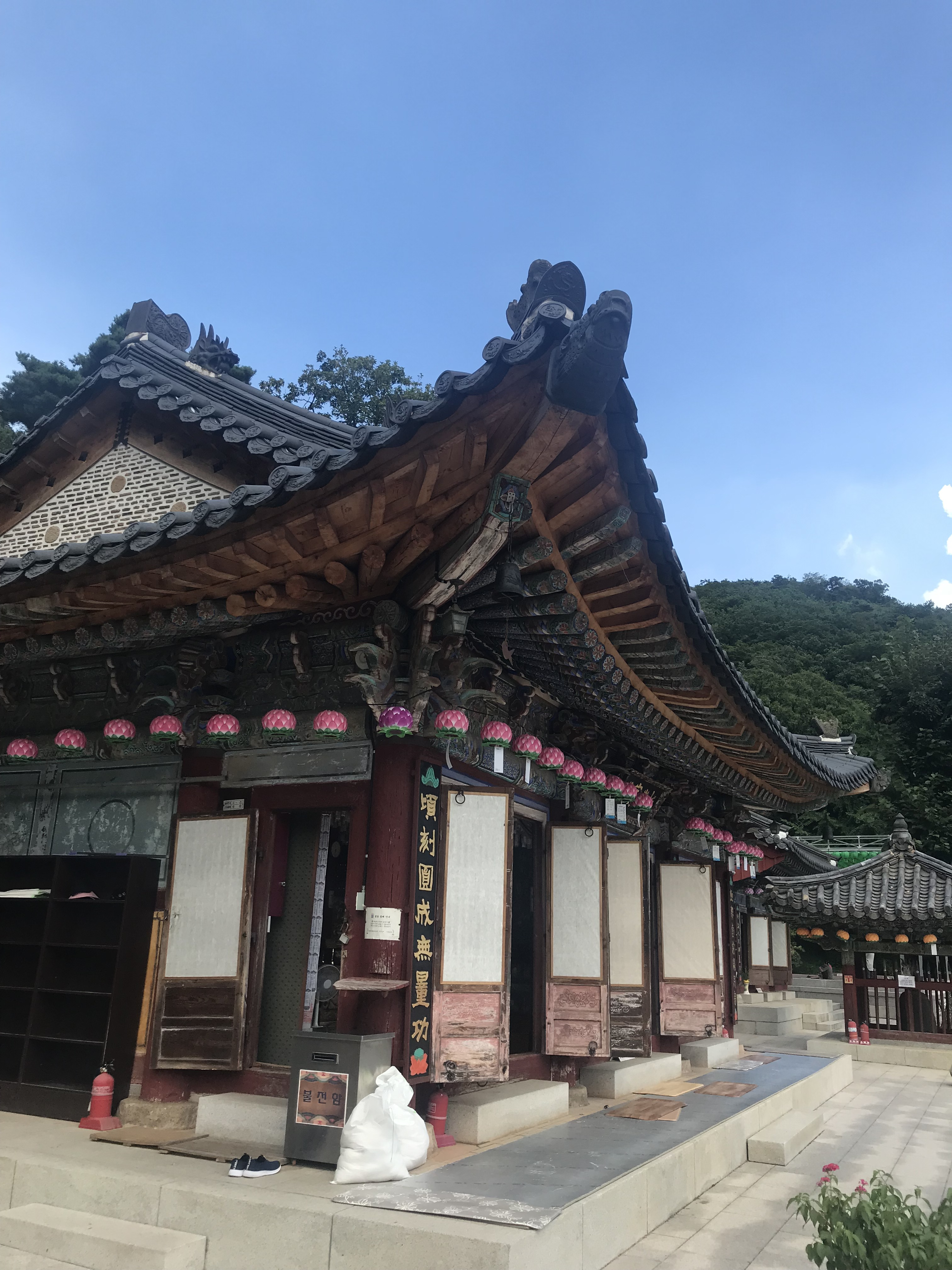
Cheonggyesa Temple

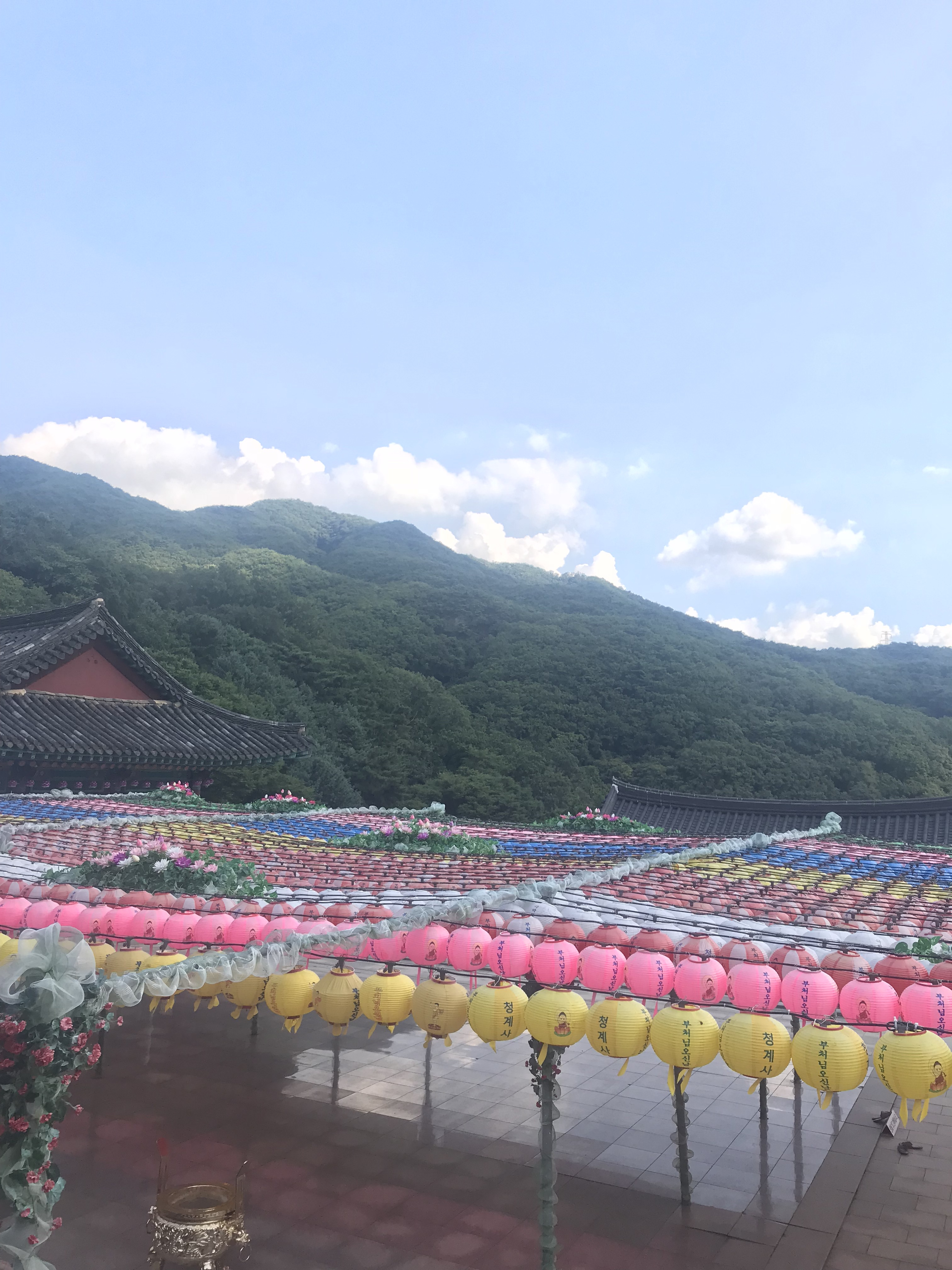
Cheonggyesa Temple

== See also ==
- Cheonggyesan (Seoul/Gyeonggi)
- Korean Buddhist temples
- Korean Buddhism
- Gyeongheo
