= Pyeongchon station =

Train station in South Korea

Coordinates: 37°23′39.47″N 126°57′49.85″E

| 평촌 (한림대성심병원); Pyeongchon (Hallym Univ. Sacred Heart Hospital) |
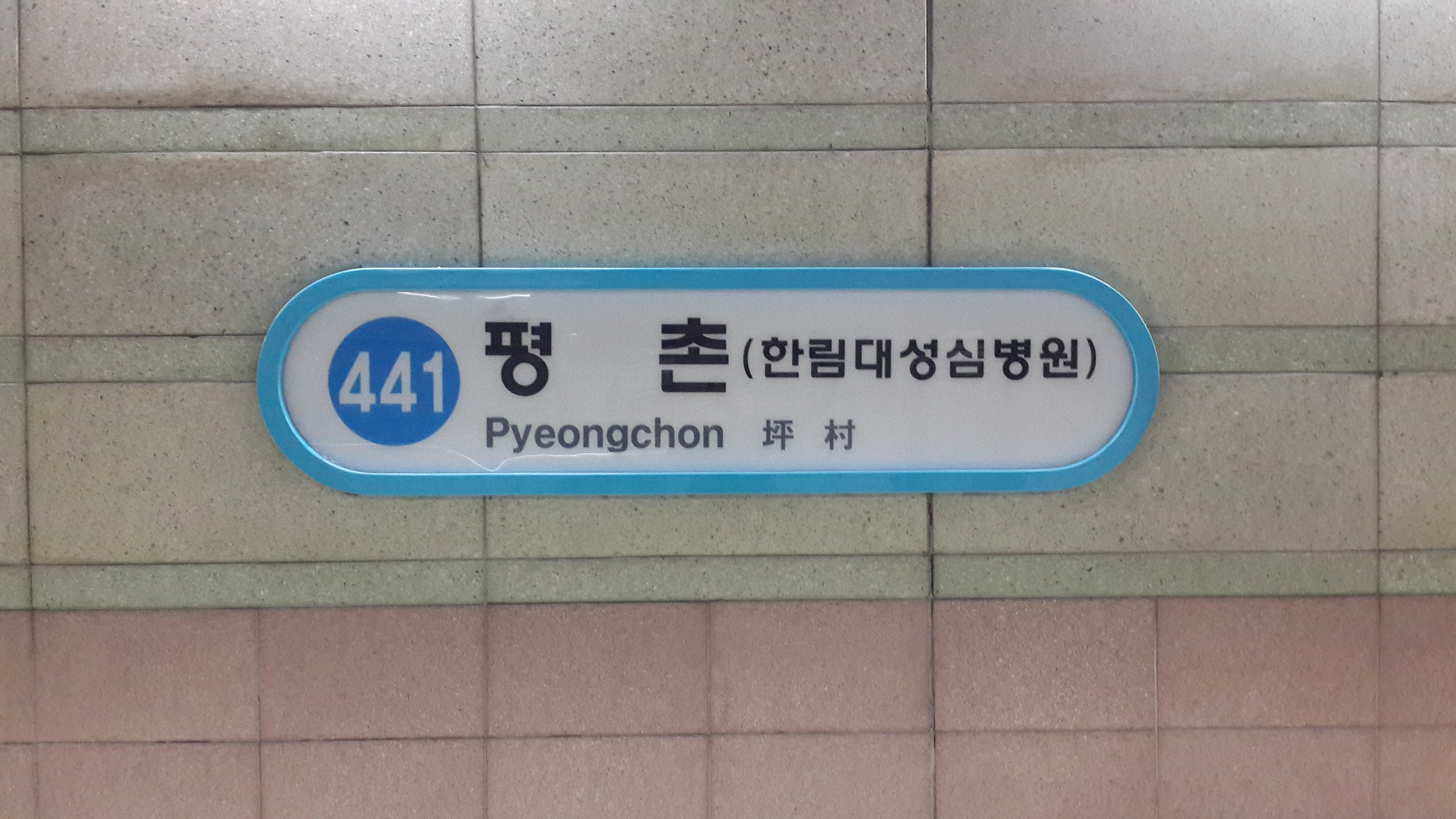
- Station nameplate

Korean name
- Hangul: 평촌역
- Hanja: 坪村驛
- Revised Romanization: Pyeongchon-yeok
- McCune–Reischauer: P'yŏngch'on-yŏk

General information
- Location: 1608-1 Burim-dong, 123 Burimno, Dongan-gu, Anyang-si, Gyeonggi-do
- Operated by: Korail
- Line: Line 4
- Platforms: 2
- Tracks: 2

Construction
- Structure type: Underground

History
- Opened: January 15, 1993 (as part of Line 1)

Key dates
- April 1, 1994: Service transferred to Line 4
Location

Pyeongchon Station is a station on the Seoul Subway Line 4. It is located in the downtown of Anyang city. Courthouse and Office of Education are near the station. The station has recently installed escalators and new exits. It is also connected to E-mart.

== Station layout ==
| G | Street level | Exit |

| L1; Concourse | Lobby | Customer Service, Shops, Vending machines, ATMs |

| L2; Platforms | Side platform, doors will open on the left |
| L2; Platforms | Southbound | Gwacheon Line toward Oido (Beomgye) → |
| L2; Platforms | Northbound | ← Gwacheon Line toward Jinjeop (Indeogwon) |
| L2; Platforms | Side platform, doors will open on the left |

| Preceding station | Seoul Metropolitan Subway | Following station |
|---|---|---|
| Indeogwon towards Jinjeop | Line 4 | Beomgye towards Oido |
