= Moraksan =

Mountain in South Korea

Moraksan (sometimes referred to as Mt. Morak) is located in Gyeonggi Province, South Korea. The mountain is 385 meters above sea level. The mountain is almost entirely composed of rock. On the north side a precipitous mountain face stretches away like a wall. In its westside is Uiwang, Anyang. On Moraksan, there is a tropaion of the 1st Division, a 15th infantry regiment.

Hiking the mountain takes about 2 hours and 30 minutes.

== See also ==
- Surisan
