= Cheonggyesan (Seoul and Gyeonggi) =

Mountain in South Korea

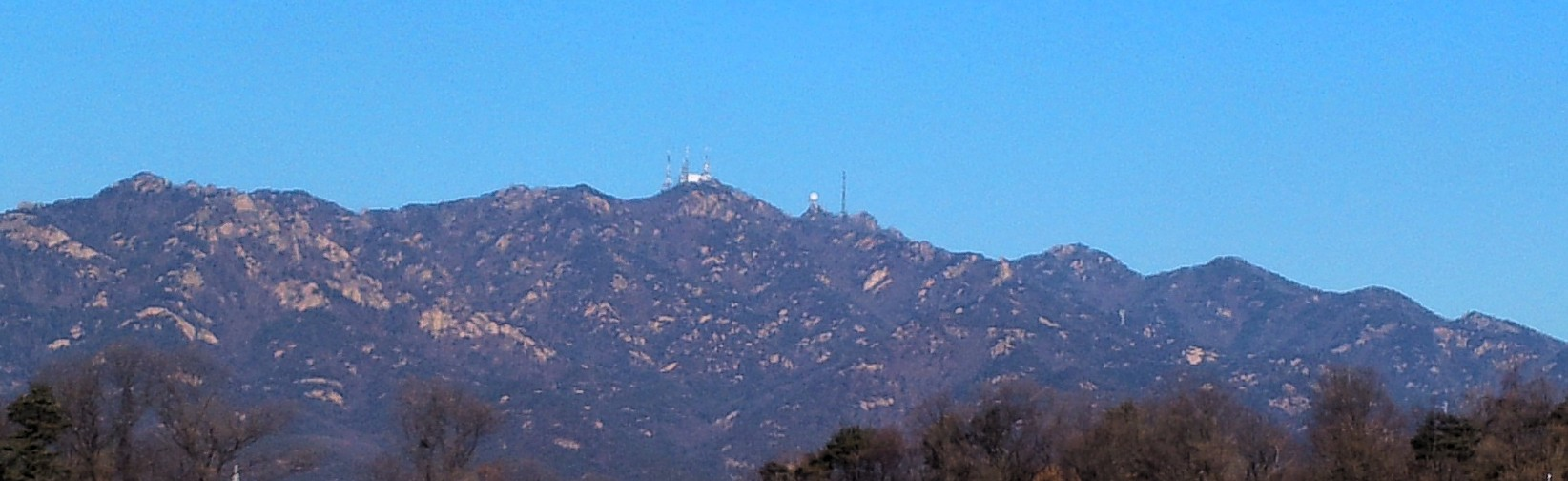
- Cheonggyesan from the north in 2015

Highest point
- Elevation: 620 m (2,030 ft)
- Coordinates: 37°24′56″N 127°02′29″E

Geography
- Location: South Korea

Climbing
- Easiest route: from Indeogwon Station, Yangjae Station then by bus

Korean name
- Hangul: 청계산
- Hanja: 淸溪山
- RR: Cheonggyesan
- MR: Ch'ŏnggyesan

Cheonggyesan (Korean: 청계산) is a mountain in South Korea. It extends over Seocho District, Seoul and the cities of Gwacheon, Uiwang, and Seongnam in Gyeonggi Province. It has an elevation of 620 m (2,034 ft).

Cheonggyesan Mountain is located in the outskirts of Seoul and has Seoul Land, a theme park, Gwacheon Seoul Grand Park, LetsRun Park Seoul, and Gwacheon National Science Museum. The hiking trail is located in Seocho, Gangnam, and there are Cheonggye Valley, Ganarigol, Yangjae Freight Terminal, and Senjyeong-dong. In addition, there is a hiking trail from Mangyeo-dong in Gwacheon, and it is popular to walk from Cheonggyecheon, Uiwang-dong to Imsubong Mangyeongdae. On the south-west, Cheonggyesa Temple, which was built during the Silla Dynasty, is located at the eastern foot of Seoul Memorial Park and the Gyeongbu Expressway flows southeast.

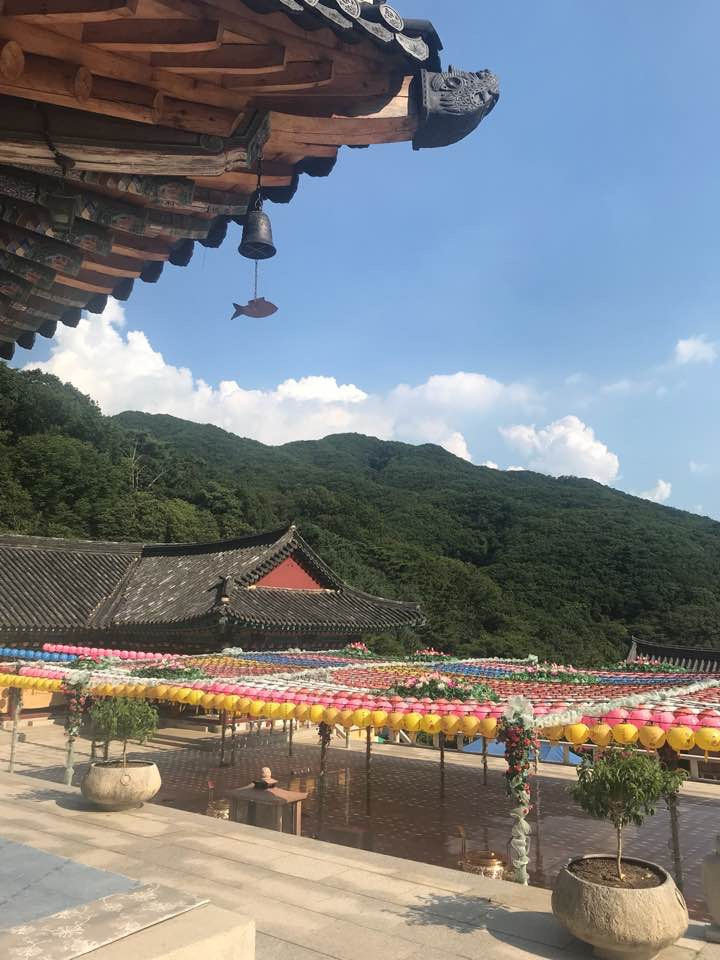
Cheonggyesa

== Human history ==
On July 27, 1987, due to the heavy rain that occurred at the time, a landslide occurred around 5:00 am in the area of the Carnivore Enclosure section of Seoul Grand Park complete destruction, and a 10-year-old female jaguar escaped. It was confirmed that she had run away, and the search started at 12:00 on the same day, and at around 18:30 on July 28, 37 hours after the incident occurred, at 245m above sea level in here, it ended with being killed.

On the morning of December 6, 2010, while the Seoul Grand Park moved Kkoma (Korean: 꼬마; lit. '(colloquial) kid') who is a male Malayan sun bear to the quarantine area and cleaned the release area, he opened the door with his front paws and escaped to here. Since the Malayan sun bear is small enough to be captured, the zoo was planned to capture Kkoma alive rather than kill. The tracking continued for about 9 days, but it was difficult to directly capture Kkoma, and a trap operation was conducted to catch him by decoy rather than tracking to reduce the stress caused by excessive tracking. On December 13, 2010, Kkoma ate snacks, cup noodles, Yōkan, etc. and drank juices and a Makgeolli at the food stalls on the mountain. Then, two days later, on December 15, the 9th day of the escape, Kkoma was caught in the trap that had been set up, after that, he was shot with a tranquilizer gun to calm down and move inside the trap, and returned safely to the zoo.

On August 19, 2018, at 9:40 am, a dismembered dead body which is murdered was found in a hiking trail of here near the parking lot of the Seoul Grand Park.

== Broadcasting facilities ==
FM Radio
Frequency	Station Name	Call Letters	Output	Broadcast Range
94.5 MHz	YTN NEWSFM	HLQV-FM	3 kW	Seoul Metropolitan Area, Northern part of North Chungcheong Province

== Transportation ==
- In Seoul

From Yangjae Station take bus number 4432

- In Uiwang in Gyeonggi Province

From Indeogwon Station Exit 2 take bus number 10 or 10-1 to the "Cheonggyesan Parking Lot" Stop

- In Seongnam in Gyeonggi Province

From Moran Station Exit 3 take the Neighborhood bus number 11-1

== See also ==
- List of mountains in Seoul
- List of mountains in Korea
- Cheonggyesa
