= Indeogwon station =

Train station in South Korea

인덕원; Indeogwon
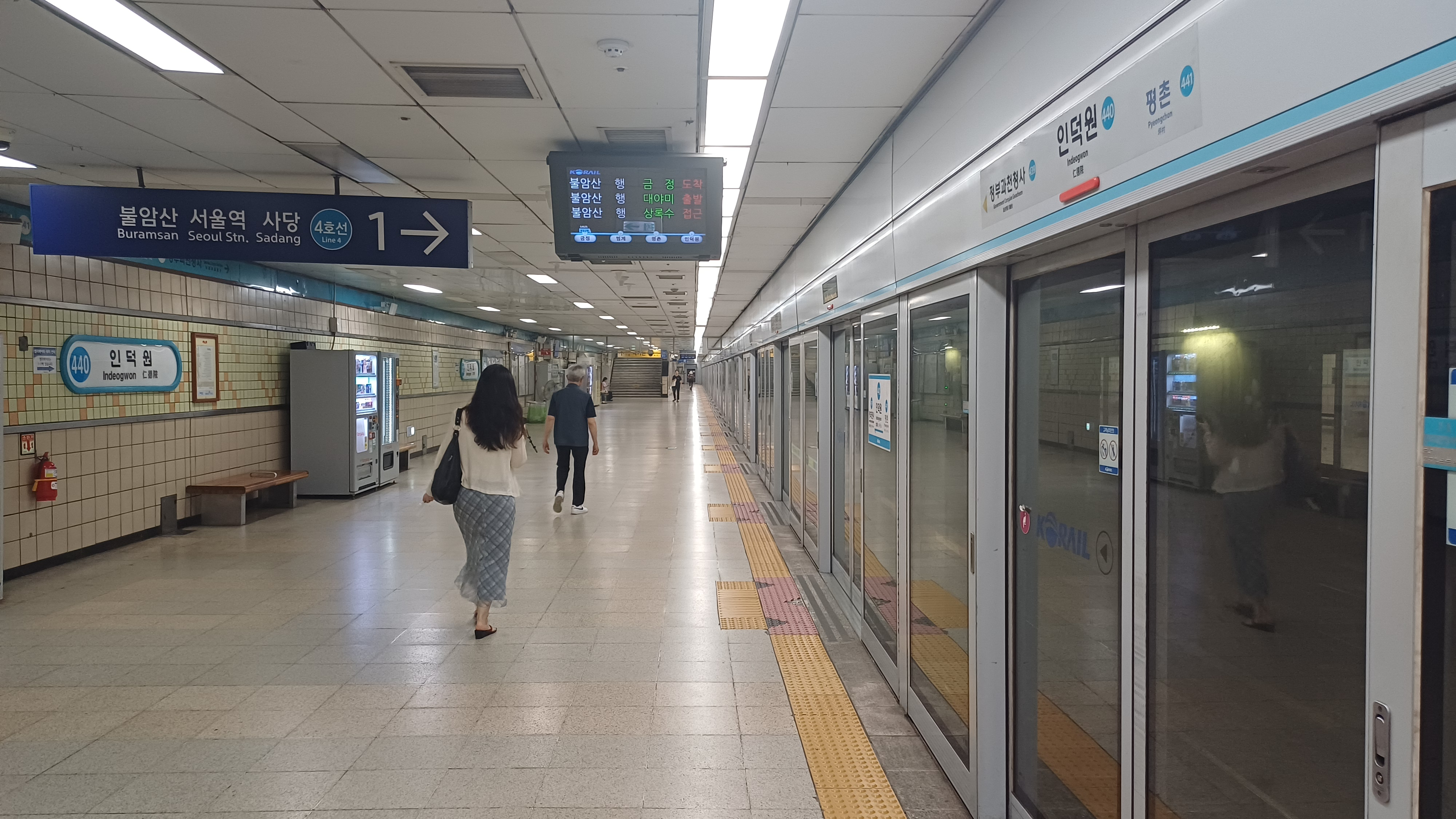

Korean name
- Hangul: 인덕원역
- Hanja: 仁德院驛
- Revised Romanization: Indeogwon-nyeok
- McCune–Reischauer: Indŏgwŏn-nyŏk

General information
- Location: 1566 Gwanyang 2-dong, Dongan-gu, Anyang-si, Gyeonggi-do
- Coordinates: 37.40200°N 126.97672°E
- Operator: Korail
- Line: Line 4
- Platforms: 2
- Tracks: 2

Construction
- Structure type: Underground

History
- Opened: January 15, 1993 (as part of Line 1)

Key dates
- April 1, 1994: Service transferred to Line 4
Location

Indeogwon Station (Korean: 인덕원역) is a metro station on South Korea's Seoul Subway Line 4 located in Gwanyang-dong, Dongan-gu, Anyang, at the Indeogwon-sageori. Due to the station's relative closeness to Poil-dong in the neighboring city of Uiwang, many people from the nearby districts also use the station, and there is a bus that is accessible through exit 2 that connects the station to Pangyo, Seongnam. It will be a transfer station to the Gyeonggang Line in 2024.

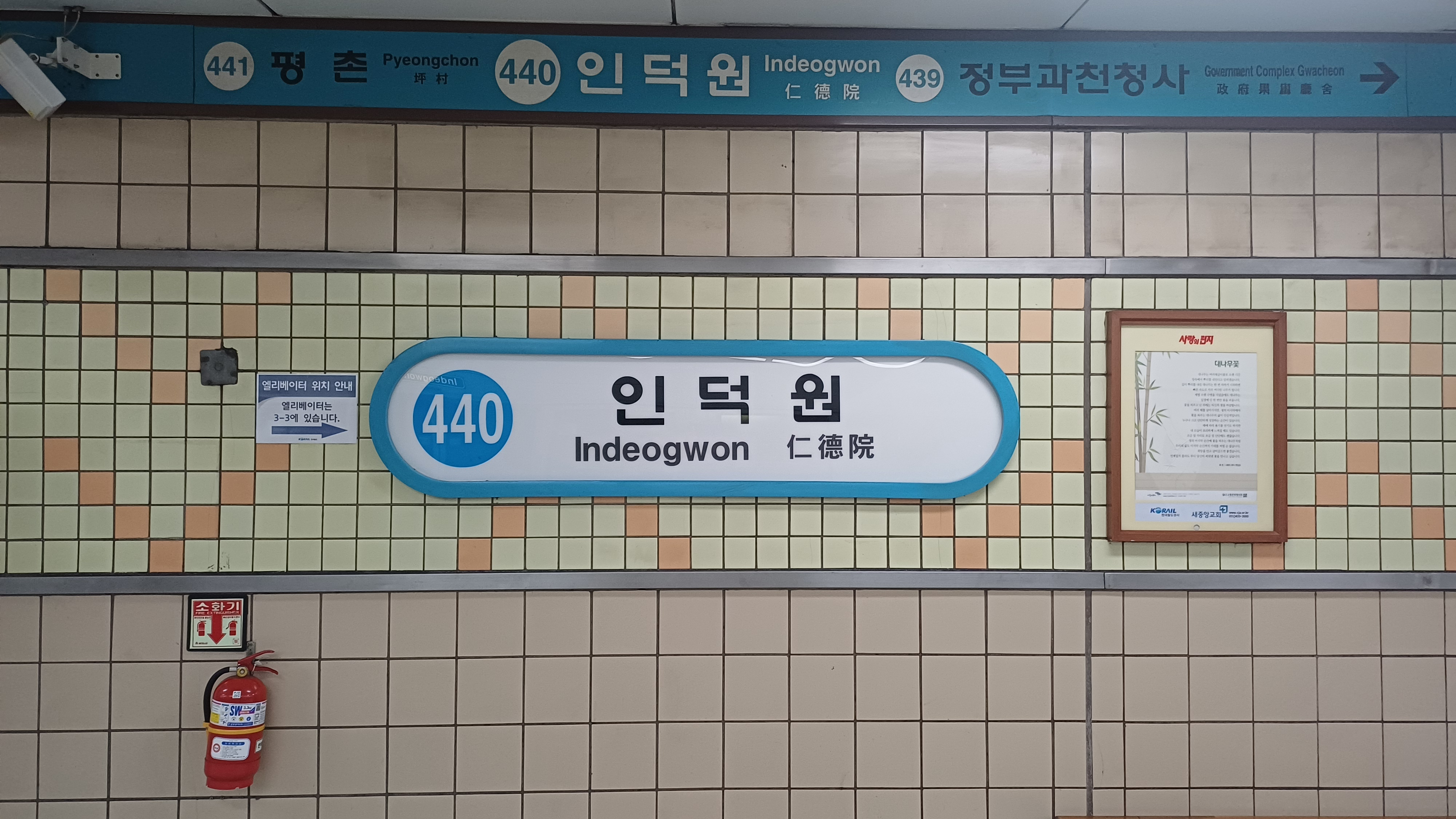

== Station layout ==
G	Street level	Exit

L1; Concourse	Lobby	Customer Service, Shops, Vending machines, ATMs

L2; Platforms	Side platform, doors will open on the left
L2; Platforms	Southbound	Gwacheon Line toward Oido (Pyeongchon) →
L2; Platforms	Northbound	← Gwacheon Line toward Jinjeop (Gov't Complex Gwacheon)
L2; Platforms	Side platform, doors will open on the left

== Neighborhood ==
- Cheonggyesa

Preceding station	Seoul Metropolitan Subway	Following station
Government Complex Gwacheon towards Jinjeop	Line 4	Pyeongchon towards Oido
