= Kim Hak-bong (murderer) =

South Korean serial killer (born 1955)

- Born: 1955 (age 70–71); North Gyeongsang Province, South Korea
- Convictions: Murder (2 counts); Theft
- Penalty: Life imprisonment

Details
- Victims: 2–3
- Span of crimes: 2001–2016
- Country: South Korea

Kim Hak-bong (Korean: 김학봉; born 1955) is a South Korean murderer and suspected serial killer. Convicted of murder twice, he was the culprit of the Suraksan hiker murder case. He received treatment for alcoholism five times, including being admitted to Daegu Psychiatric Hospital for three months starting in June 1997.

== Crimes ==
On 10 January 2001, Kim stabbed and killed a person surnamed Lee (64 years old, female at the time) in a village in Cheongdo County, North Gyeongsang Province. He was sentenced to 15 years in prison by the Daegu District Court for robbery and murder and was released on 19 January 2016.

Kim was arrested on charges of murdering a woman in her 60s by stabbing her several times with a weapon in Suraksan, Seoul, at approximately 5:32 a.m. on 29 May 2016. During police interrogation, he admitted that "I killed a woman in her 60s while trying to take money."

On 3 June 2016, the police revealed Kim's face and real name in accordance with the decision of the Personal Information Disclosure Committee that took into account the brutality of the crime. The police revealed that he suffered from schizophrenia.

== Trial and sentence ==
Kim was convicted of on charges of attempted murder and theft by the 12th Criminal Division of the Seoul High Court and was sentenced to life imprisonment in the first trial and also in the appellate trial, in January 2017.

== See also ==
- List of serial killers by country
