= Gaeunsan =

Mountain in Seoul, South Korea

- Location within Seoul Location within South Korea

Highest point
- Coordinates: 37°35′47″N 127°01′39″E

Geography
- Location: Seoul, South Korea

Korean name
- Hangul: 개운산
- Hanja: 開運山
- RR: Gaeunsan
- MR: Kaeunsan

Gaeunsan is a mountain in Seoul, South Korea.

== See also ==
- List of mountains of Korea
