= Buramsan =

Mountain in Gyeonggi Province, South Korea

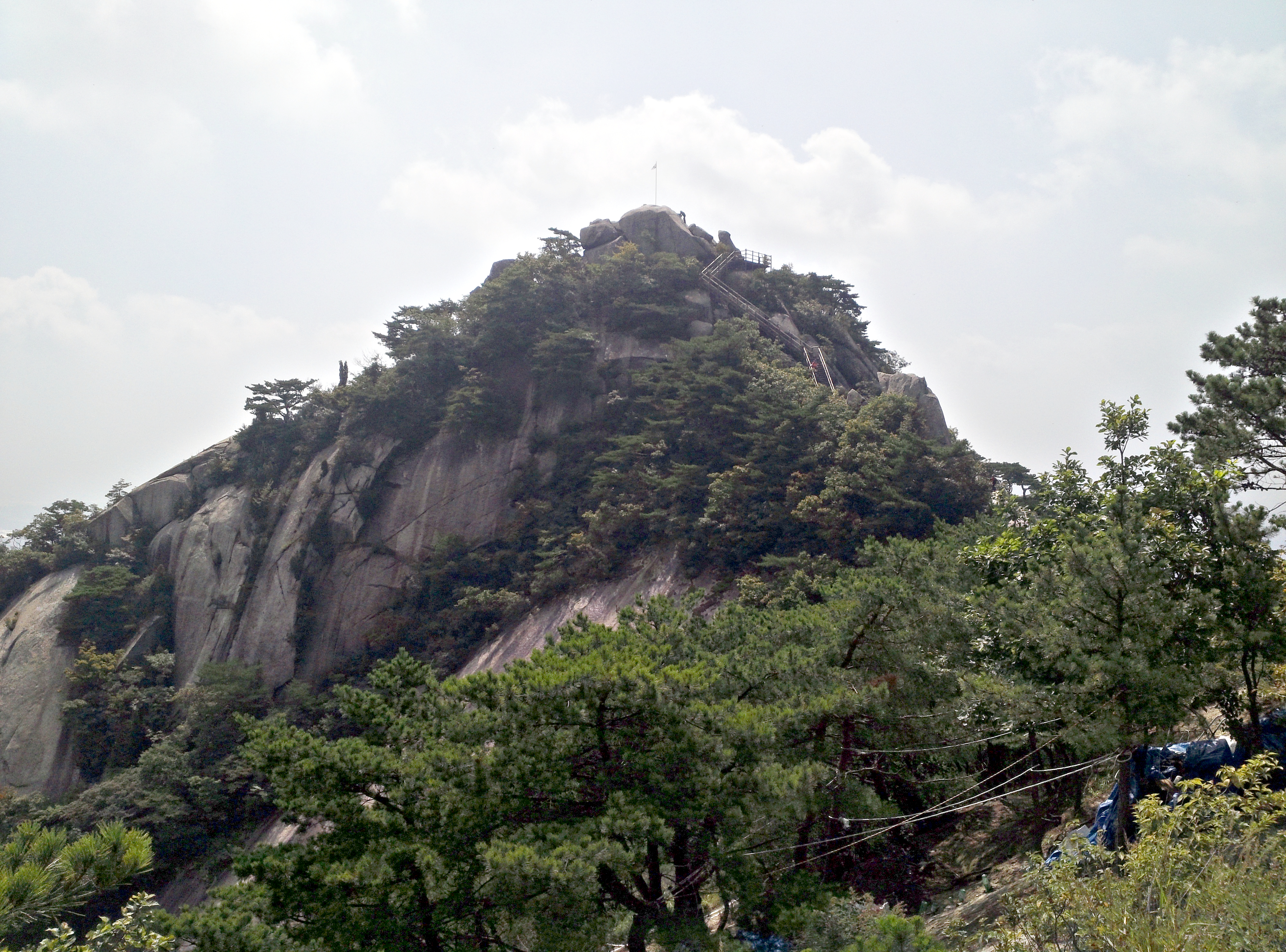

Highest point
- Elevation: 507 m (1,663 ft)
- Coordinates: 37°33′58″N 127°06′9″E

Geography
- Location within Seoul Location within South Korea
- Location: South Korea

Climbing
- Easiest route: from Danggogae Station, Sanggye Station

Korean name
- Hangul: 불암산
- Hanja: 佛岩山
- RR: Buramsan
- MR: Puramsan

Buramsan (Korean: 불암산) is a mountain in South Korea. It sits on the boundary between Nowon District, Seoul and Namyangju in Gyeonggi Province. It has an elevation of 507 m (1,663 ft). It also has a heliport at the second peak (420 m (1,378 ft)).

== Gallery ==
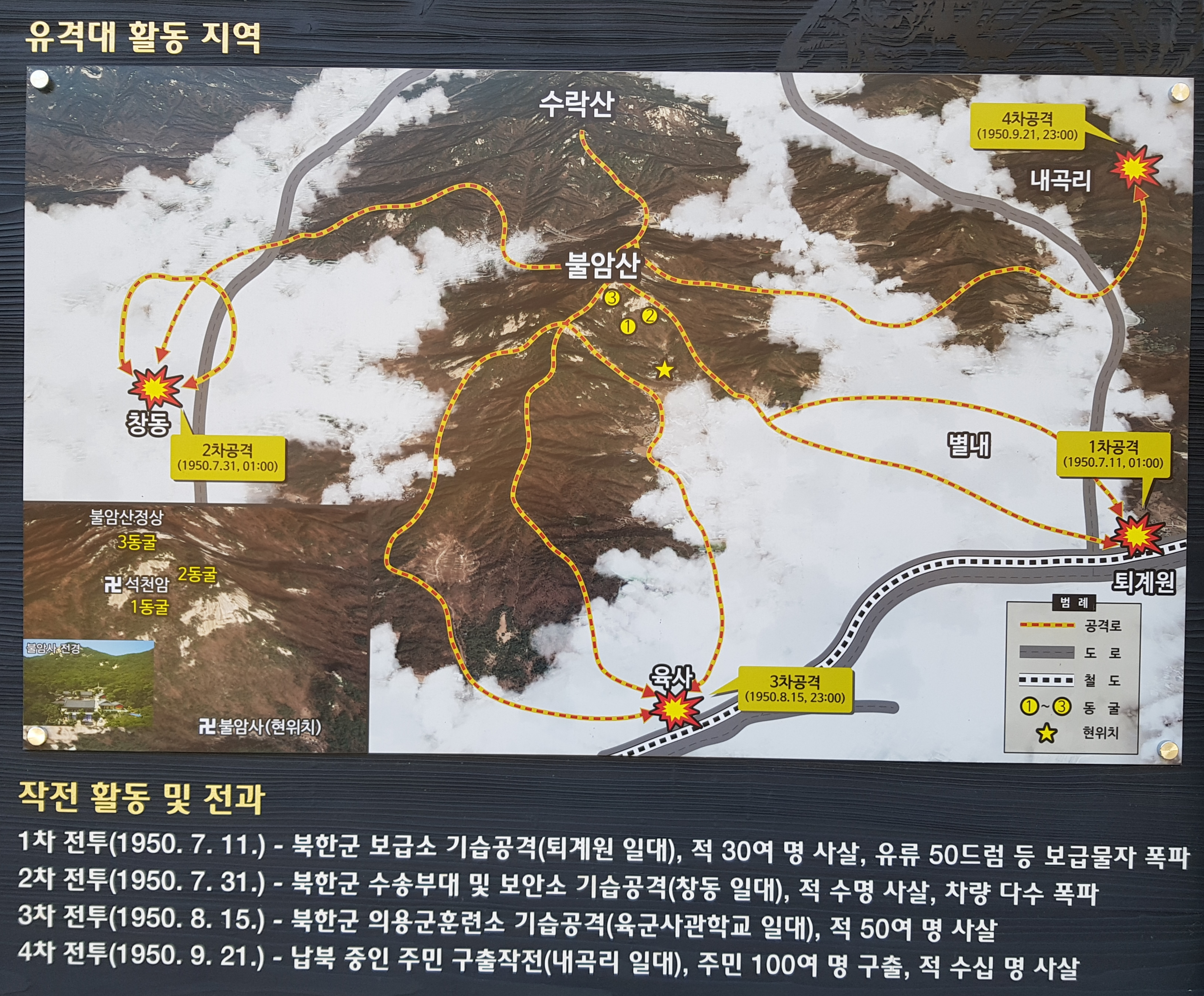
Signpost showing military action on the mountain during the Korean War

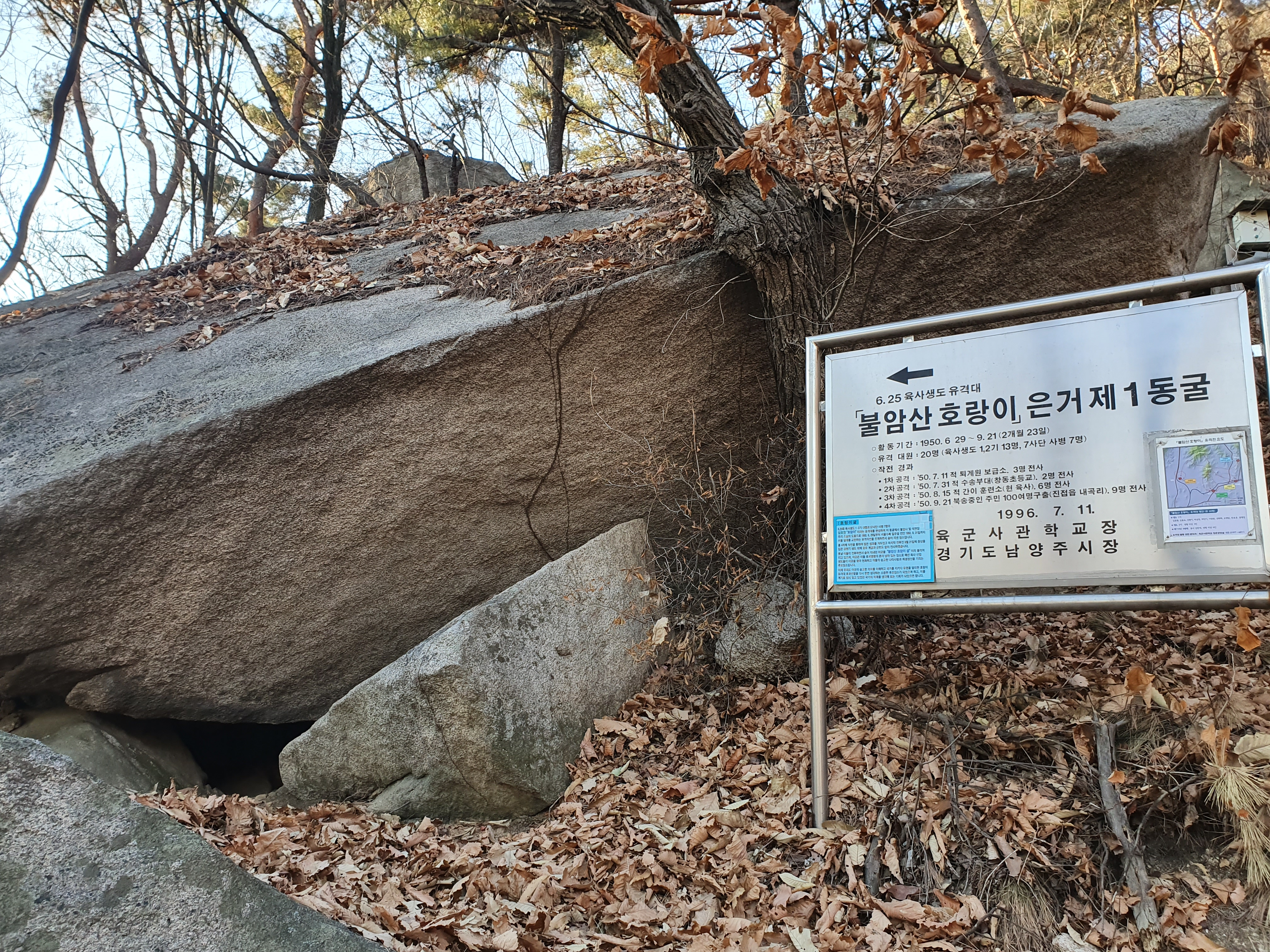
A cave on the mountain used during the Korean War

== See also ==
- List of mountains in Seoul
- List of mountains in Korea
