= Ansan (Seoul) =

Mountain in Seoul, South Korea

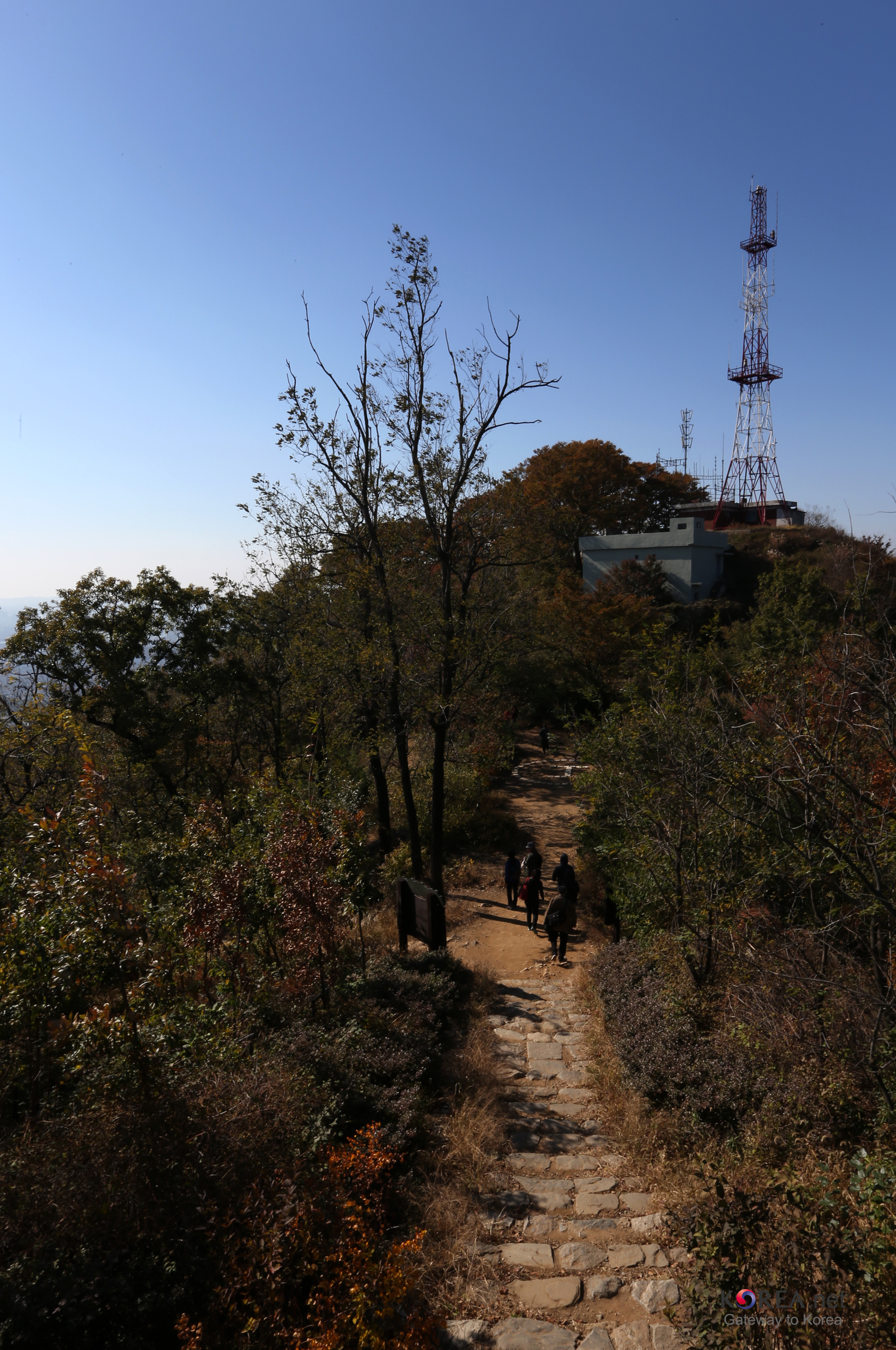
- Trail of Ansan (2012)

Highest point
- Elevation: 295.5 m (969 ft)
- Coordinates: 37°34′36″N 126°56′41″E

Geography
- Location: Seoul, South Korea

Korean name
- Hangul: 안산
- Hanja: 鞍山
- RR: Ansan
- MR: Ansan

Ansan (Korean: 안산) is a hill in the Seodaemun District of Seoul, South Korea. It has an elevation of 295.5 metres (969 ft). It has a trail called "Ansan Jarak-gil" (안산 자락길) with wooden walking paths. The quality of the trail and its accessibility have been praised.

== Gallery ==
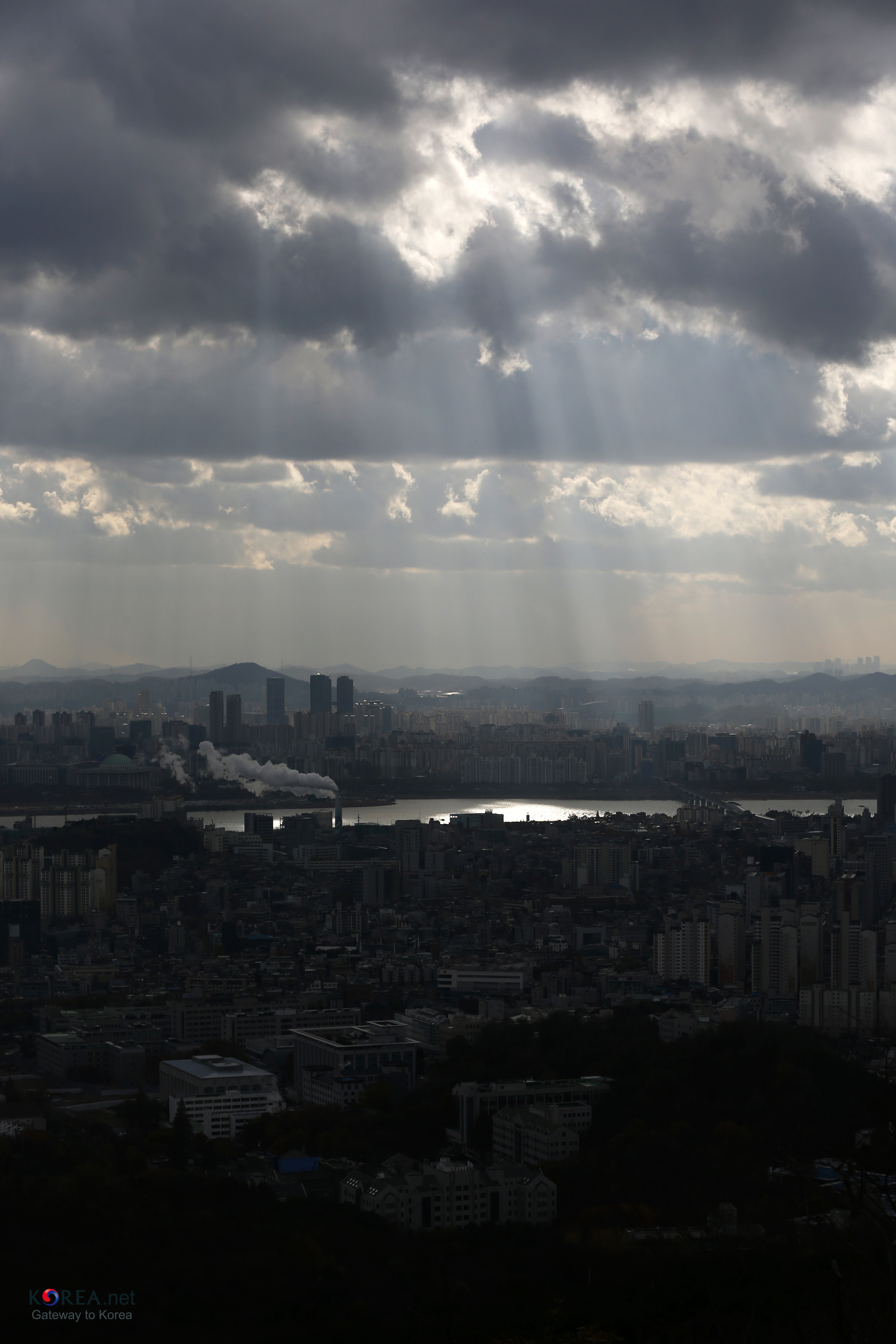
View of Seodaemun District from the mountain (2013)

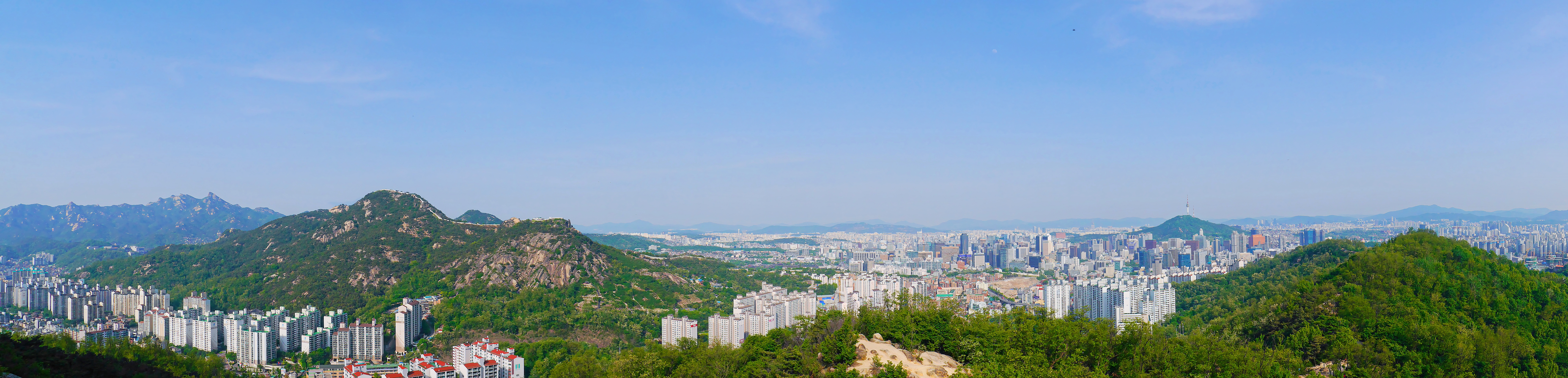
Panorama view from the mountain (2014)

== See also ==
- List of mountains in Korea
- List of mountains in Seoul
- Ansan
