= Cheonggyesan (Yangpyeong) =

Mountain in Gyeonggi Province, South Korea

Highest point
- Elevation: 658.4 m (2,160 ft)

Geography
- Location: South Korea

Korean name
- Hangul: 청계산
- Hanja: 淸溪山
- RR: Cheonggyesan
- MR: Ch'ŏnggyesan

Cheonggyesan (Korean: 청계산) is a mountain in Gyeonggi Province, South Korea. Its area extends over Yangpyeong County. Cheonggyesan has an elevation of 658.4 m (2,160 ft).

== See also ==
- List of mountains in Korea
