= Myeongjisan =

Mountain in Gapyeong County, Gyeonggi Province in South Korea

Coordinates: 37°55′58″N 127°25′51″E

Highest point
- Elevation: 1,267 m (4,157 ft)

Geography
- Location: South Korea

Korean name
- Hangul: 명지산
- Hanja: 明智山
- RR: Myeongjisan
- MR: Myŏngjisan

Myeongjisan (Korean: 명지산) is a mountain in Gapyeong County, Gyeonggi Province, in South Korea. It has an elevation of 1,267 m (4,157 ft).

== See also ==
- List of mountains in Korea
