= Suraksan =

Mountain in South Korea

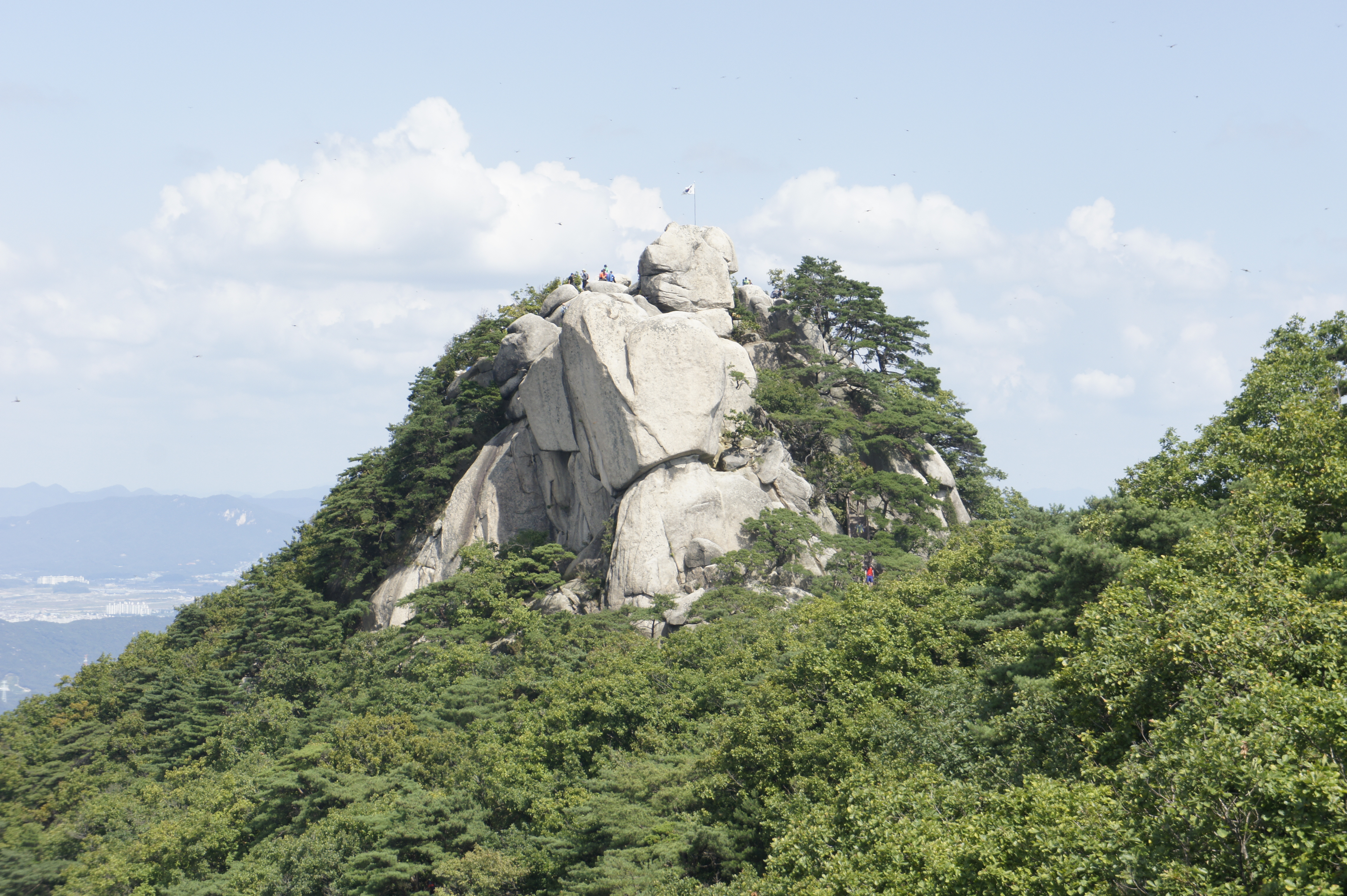

Highest point
- Elevation: 637.7 m (2,092 ft)
- Coordinates: 37°41′46″N 127°04′55″E

Geography
- Location: Seoul and Gyeonggi Province, South Korea

Climbing
- Easiest route: Jangam Station

Korean name
- Hangul: 수락산
- Hanja: 水落山
- RR: Suraksan
- MR: Suraksan

Suraksan (Korean: 수락산) is a mountain in South Korea. It extends from the Nowon District of Seoul to the cities of Namyangju and Uijeongbu in Gyeonggi Province. It has an elevation of 637.7 m (2,092 ft).

== Sights ==
Suraksan is a hiking mountain, notable sights include the Geunnyu, Eunnyu, and Ongnyu waterfalls, the Heungguksa temple from the Silla period, the Seongnimsa temple from the Joseon period, and Gwesanjeong Pavilion.

== See also ==
- List of mountains in Seoul
- List of mountains in Korea
