= Junggok-dong =

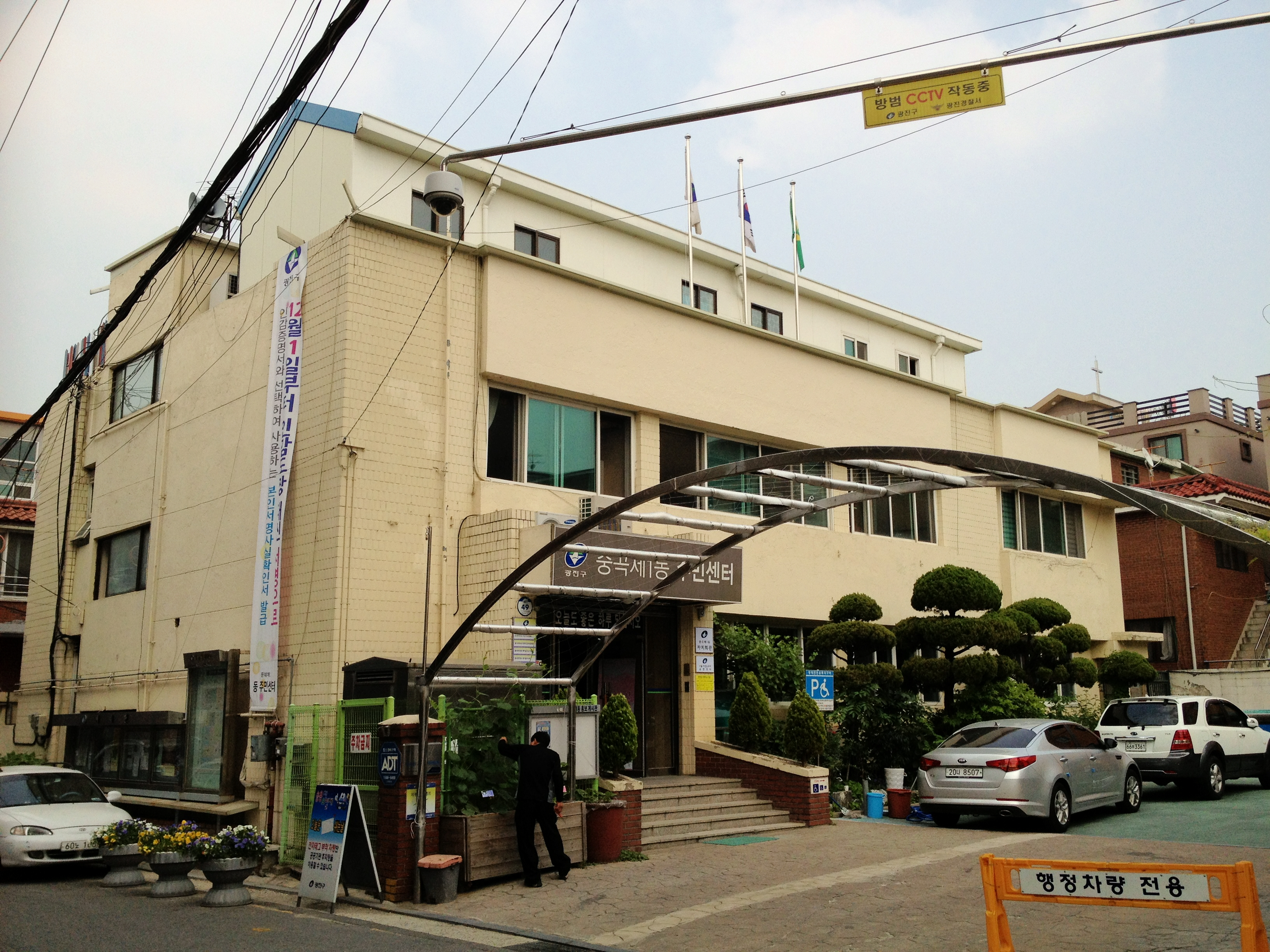
- Junggok 1-dong Community Service Center (Gwangjin District)
- Country: South Korea

Area
  - Total: 4.06 km^{2} (1.57 sq mi)

Population (2001)
  - Total: 97,330
  - Density: 24,000/km^{2} (62,100/sq mi)

Korean name
- Hangul: 중곡동
- Hanja: 中谷洞
- RR: Junggok-dong
- MR: Chunggok-tong

Junggok-dong (Korean: 중곡동) is a dong (neighbourhood) of Gwangjin District, Seoul, South Korea.

== Overview ==
Junggok-dong is located at the western foot of Achasan Mountain. The origin of its name is because Junggok-dong is located in the middle of Neung-dong and Myeonmok-dong, so it was called 'Gandetmal' or 'Junggok-ri' in Chinese characters. Junggok-dong is an area with convenient transportation where Cheonho-daero, Dongil-ro, Neungdong-ro, and Gingorang-ro pass, and subway lines 5 and 7 intersect. It is a general residential area created in a safe and comfortable manner through improved water defense facilities and development along the Jungnang Stream.

== See also ==
- Administrative divisions of South Korea
