= Sinwol-dong =

Coordinates: 38°13′N 127°35′E

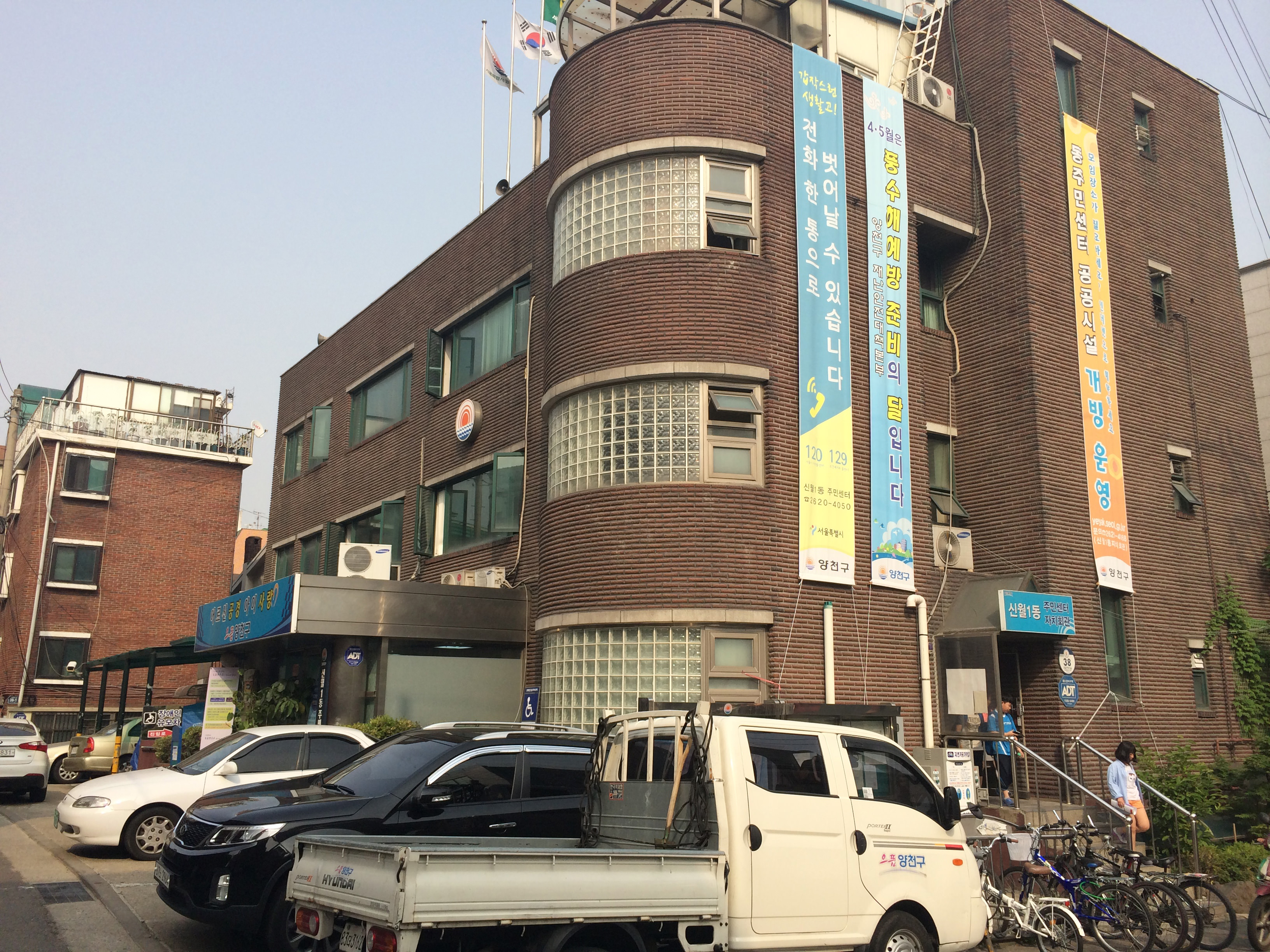
- Community Service Center in Sinwol-dong
- Interactive map of Sinwol-dong
- Country: South Korea

Area
  - Total: 5.14 km^{2} (1.98 sq mi)

Population (2001)
  - Total: 156,264
  - Density: 30,401.56/km^{2} (78,739.7/sq mi)

Korean name
- Hangul: 신월동
- Hanja: 新月洞
- RR: Sinwol-dong
- MR: Sinwŏl-tong

Sinwol-dong (Korean: 신월동) is a dong (neighbourhood) of Yangcheon District, Seoul, South Korea.

== History ==
During the Gabo reform during the 31st year of reign of King Gojong, the administrative district was reorganized from Yangcheon-hyeon (縣) to Gun (郡), and when Sinwol was incorporated into Gimpo-gun in 1914, the administrative district changed to Sindang-ri, Yangdong-myeon, Gimpo-gun. The name Sindang-ri derives from the name of the village of "Sinwol and Danggok." The Sindangri region was a scanty mountainous village which had villages such as "Danggok, Koeumwol, Shindae, Shinwol, Gatri". "Danggok" was called Danggol because there was a city shrine (都堂) where they had shrine rituals. "Koeunwol" had a meaning of a town where the moon shines bright which originated from the korean word for beautiful moon. "Shindae" means Newly founded village. The words "Sinwol" and "Gateri" derive from the shape of the region, and are said to be the same shape as the half-moon on the east side of Jeungsan (currently Sinwol 3-dong area).

== See also ==
- Administrative divisions of South Korea
