= Samseongsan (Gyeonggi/Seoul) =

Mountain in South Korea

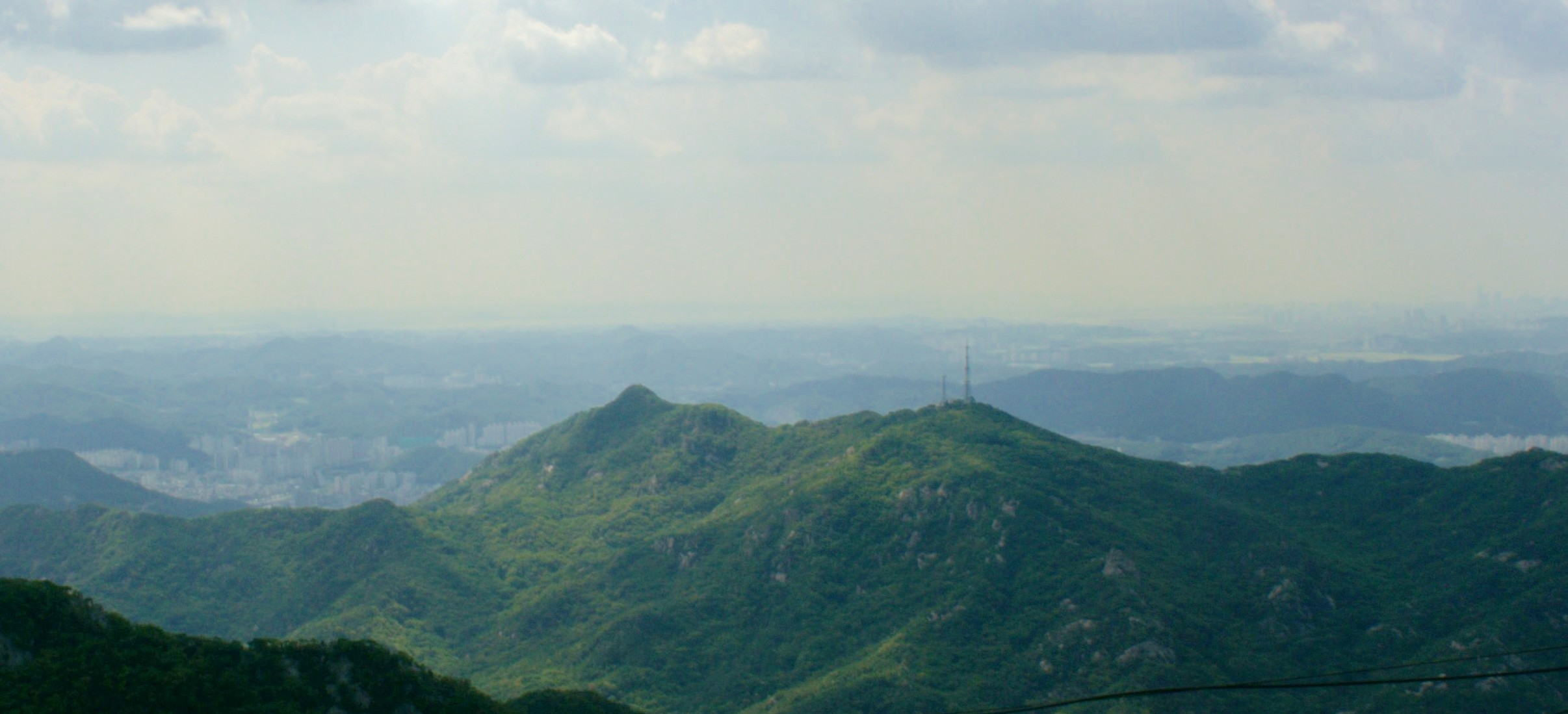

Highest point
- Elevation: 481 m (1,578 ft)
- Coordinates: 37°25′54″N 126°55′49″E

Geography
- Location: Seoul and Anyang, South Korea

Climbing
- Easiest route: Seoul National University

Korean name
- Hangul: 삼성산
- Hanja: 三聖山
- RR: Samseongsan
- MR: Samsŏngsan

Samseongsan (Korean: 삼성산) is a mountain in South Korea. It extends across the districts of Gwanak District and Geumcheon District, Seoul and Anyang, in Gyeonggi Province. It has an elevation of 481 m (1,578 ft).

== See also ==
- List of mountains in Seoul
- List of mountains in Korea
- List of mountains in South Korea
