= Uiwang =

City in Gyeonggi, South Korea

Coordinates: 37°20′41″N 126°58′06″E

- Municipal City
- Flag Emblem of Uiwang

- Location in South Korea
- Country: South Korea
- Region: Gyeonggi Province (Sudogwon)
- Administrative divisions: 6 dong

Area
  - Total: 53.46 km^{2} (20.64 sq mi)

Population (September 2024)
  - Total: 154,923
  - Density: 2,964.5/km^{2} (7,678/sq mi)
  - Dialect: Seoul

Korean name
- Hangul: 의왕시
- Hanja: 義王市
- RR: Uiwang-si
- MR: Ŭiwang-si

Uiwang (Korean: 의왕; Korean pronunciation: [ɰi.waŋ]) is a city in Gyeonggi Province, South Korea. It is one of many satellite cities that ring Seoul, making up the Seoul Capital Area. Its largest immediate urban neighbor is Anyang. The low peaks of the Gwangju Mountains (including Moraksan) shape the local landscape.

Rail transportation is important in Uiwang, which is home to the Korean Railroad Museum and Korea National Railroad College. Seoul Subway Line 1 passes through the city, as does the Gyeongbu Line. In addition, a terminal of Hanjin container shipping is located here.

== Geography ==
Uiwang lies just south of Seoul. It is bounded to the east by Baegunsan (백운산), Barasan (바라산), the lower slopes of Cheonggyesan (청계산), and Maebongsan (매봉산); to the south by the city of Suwon, to the west by Ansan, Gunpo, and Anyang; and to the north by Gwacheon.

There are two noteworthy reservoirs in the city: Baegun Lake (백운호수) at the foot of Baegunsan, and Wangsong Lake (왕송호수), by the border with Suwon. Baegun Lake has a number of foreign restaurants, while Wangsong Lake, accessible from Uiwang Station, has a recreational draisine, the Korean Railroad Museum, and Uiwang's Nature Education Park. The source of the Anyangcheon — a tributary of the Han River — is in Uiwang, as is the source of the Haguicheon, itself a tributary of the Anyangcheon. Most of Uiwang is thus drained northwards. However, the Hwanggujicheon's source is also in Uiwang, and this flows south, eventually emptying into the Yellow Sea at Asan Bay.

== History ==
- 1 April 1914: Gwangju-gun's Uigok-myeon (의곡면) and Wangnyun-myeon (왕륜면) were combined and transferred to Suwon-gun, which renamed it Uiwang-myeon (의왕면).
- 1 October 1936: Ilhyeong-myeon (일형면) was incorporated into Uiwang-myeon.
- 14 August 1949: The district was transferred to Hwaseong-gun, and was renamed Ilwang-myeon (일왕면).
- 1 January 1963: Ilhyeong-myeon was transferred to Suwon City, while the remainder became Uiwang-myeon, now in Siheung-gun..
- 1 December 1980: Uiwang-myeon became Uiwang-eup.
- 15 February 1983: Woram-ri (월암리) and Chopyeong-ri (초평리), formerly in Hwaseong-gun's Banwol-myeon (반월면), were transferred to Uiwang-eup.
- 1 March 1983: Naeson-ri (내손리), Poil-ri (포일리), Cheonggye-ri (청계리), and Hagui-ri (학의리) were put under the jurisdiction of Uiwang-eup's Eastern Branch Office.
- 1 January 1989: Uiwang separated from Siheung-gun, forming its own city.
- 20 February 2007: The Chinese characters used in the name of Uiwang were changed from 儀旺 to 義王.

In recent times, Uiwang has developed considerably thanks to the expansion of Anyang. Several districts are also directly connected with Gunpo and Suwon.

== Administrative districts ==
There are six administrative districts:

| Dong (district) | Population |
|---|---|
| Gocheon-dong | 13,386 |
| Naseonil(1)-dong | 23,136 |
| Naseonil(2)-dong | 27,212 |
| Ojeon-dong | 44,076 |
| Cheonggye-dong | 14,401 |
| Bugok-dong | 26,846 |

== Climate ==
Uiwang has a humid continental climate (Köppen: Dwa), but can be considered a borderline humid subtropical climate (Köppen: Cwa) using the −3 °C (27 °F) isotherm.

Climate data for Uiwang (2004–2020 normals)
| Month | Jan | Feb | Mar | Apr | May | Jun | Jul | Aug | Sep | Oct | Nov | Dec | Year |
|---|---|---|---|---|---|---|---|---|---|---|---|---|---|
| Mean daily maximum °C (°F) | 1.9 (35.4) | 4.8 (40.6) | 10.6 (51.1) | 17.2 (63.0) | 23.1 (73.6) | 27.2 (81.0) | 28.5 (83.3) | 29.8 (85.6) | 25.4 (77.7) | 19.5 (67.1) | 11.6 (52.9) | 3.5 (38.3) | 16.9 (62.4) |
| Daily mean °C (°F) | −2.7 (27.1) | 0.0 (32.0) | 5.2 (41.4) | 11.2 (52.2) | 17.0 (62.6) | 21.7 (71.1) | 24.5 (76.1) | 25.3 (77.5) | 20.3 (68.5) | 13.9 (57.0) | 6.8 (44.2) | −0.9 (30.4) | 11.9 (53.4) |
| Mean daily minimum °C (°F) | −7.0 (19.4) | −4.6 (23.7) | 0.2 (32.4) | 5.7 (42.3) | 11.4 (52.5) | 17.1 (62.8) | 21.3 (70.3) | 21.9 (71.4) | 16.1 (61.0) | 8.9 (48.0) | 2.2 (36.0) | −5.1 (22.8) | 7.3 (45.1) |
| Average precipitation mm (inches) | 12.6 (0.50) | 26.4 (1.04) | 36.4 (1.43) | 68.1 (2.68) | 90.9 (3.58) | 117.1 (4.61) | 437.7 (17.23) | 259.1 (10.20) | 136.7 (5.38) | 50.9 (2.00) | 57.5 (2.26) | 20.6 (0.81) | 1,314 (51.73) |
| Average precipitation days (≥ 0.1 mm) | 3.2 | 3.1 | 5.1 | 7.1 | 6.9 | 8.0 | 14.5 | 11.5 | 7.9 | 4.7 | 7.1 | 5.1 | 84.2 |
Source: Korea Meteorological Administration

== Transport ==
=== Rail ===
The Gyeongbu Line passes through Uiwang, with Seoul Subway Line 1 stopping at Uiwang Station. Cargo trains also deliver to Obong Station.

=== Road ===
The Seoul Ring Expressway, Yeongdong Expressway, National Road 1, and the Gwacheon-Bongdam Highway (309) pass through Uiwang.

== Education ==
=== Higher education ===
Uiwang is home to the Uiwang Campus of the Korea National University of Transportation, and Kaywon University of Art and Design.

=== Further education ===
There are six high schools in the city: Gyeonggi Foreign Language High School, Uiwang High School, Baegun High School, Useong High School, Naeson High School, and Morak High School.

=== Secondary education ===
Uiwang houses eight middle schools: Baegun Middle School, Gocheon Middle School, Uiwang Middle School, Uiwang Bugok Middle School, Galmoe Middle School, Naeson Middle School, Morak Middle School, and Deokjang Middle School.

=== Primary education ===
There are twelve elementary schools in Uiwang: Uiwang Elementary School, Gocheon Elementary School, Galmoe Elementary School, Uiwang Bugok Elementary School, Wanggok Elementary School, Uiwang Deokseong Elementary School, Deokjang Elementary School, Ojeon Elementary School, Baegun Elementary School, Naeson Elementary School, Morak Elementary School, and Naedong Elementary School.

== Government ==
City Hall, the central library, seniors' social center, health center, and youth centers are all located in Gocheon-dong.

Korea Correctional Service operates the Seoul Detention Center in Uiwang.

== Industry ==
There are many large corporations, such as Haitai confectionaries, Cheil Industries, Hyundai Rotem, and various trade and logistics companies in Uiwang.

== Twin towns – sister cities ==
Uiwang is twinned with:

- North Little Rock, Arkansas, United States (2000)
- Kimitsu, Chiba, Japan (2002)

== See also ==
- List of cities in South Korea
- Geography of South Korea
