= Ansan Line =

Railway line in South Korea

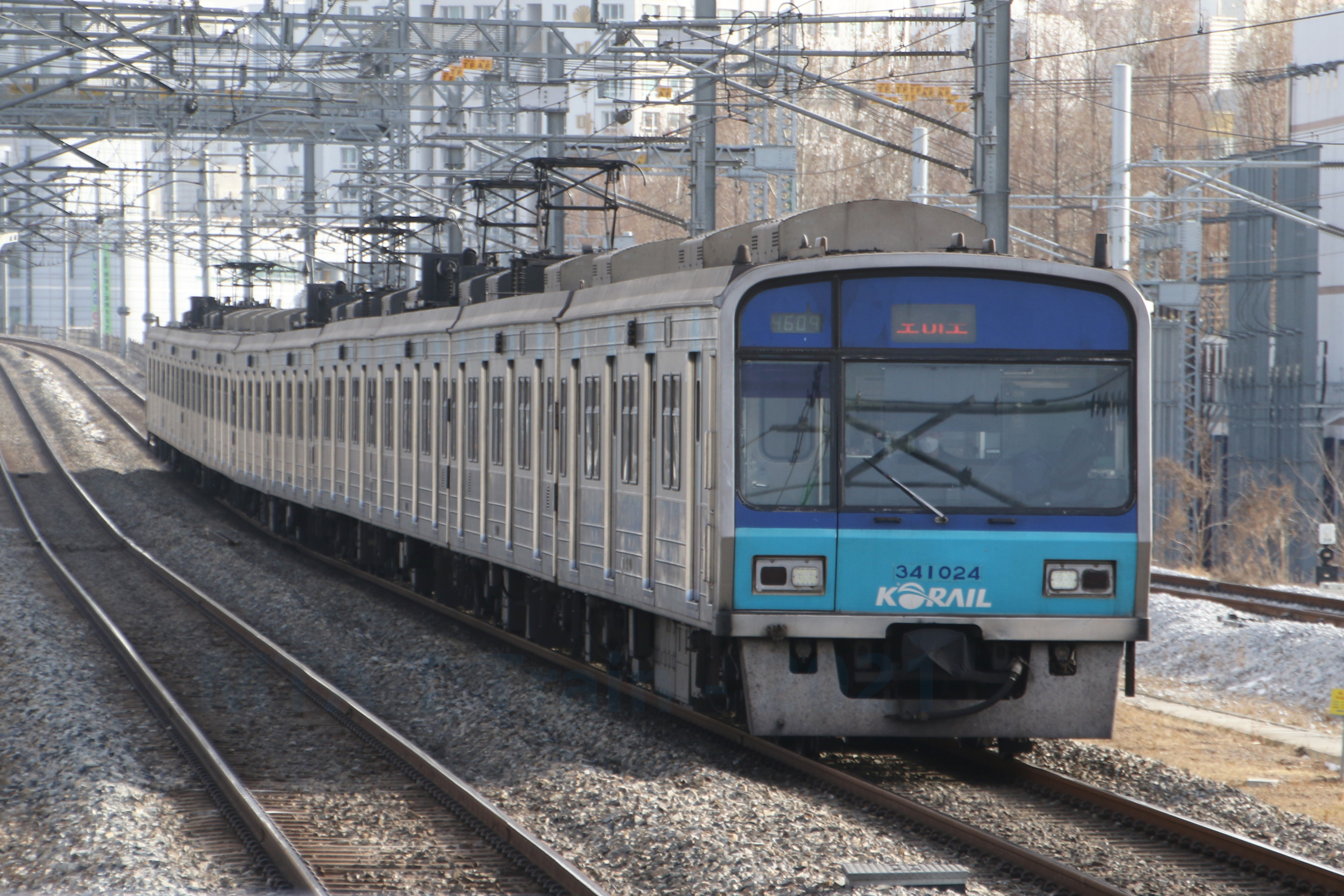

Overview
- Native name: 안산선(安山線)
- Status: Operational
- Owner: Korea Rail Network Authority
- Locale: Gyeonggi
- Termini: Geumjeong; Oido
- Stations: 14

Service
- Type: Rapid transit
- System: Seoul Metropolitan Subway
- Services: Line 4
- Operator: Korail

History
- Opened: 25 October 1988

Technical
- Line length: 26.0 km (16.2 mi)
- Number of tracks: Double track
- Track gauge: 1,435 mm (4 ft 8 1/2 in) standard gauge
- Electrification: 25 kV/60 Hz AC Overhead line

- Ansan Line
- Hangul: 안산선
- Hanja: 安山線
- RR: Ansanseon
- MR: Ansansŏn

The Ansan Line is a railway line connecting Gunpo to Siheung in South Korea. Services on this line run through train services into Seoul Subway Line 4 via the Gwacheon Line. Services from the Suin Line share tracks with this line between Hanyang Univ. (Ansan)–Oido.

== History ==
In 1988 the section between Geumjeong–Ansan opened as a branch line of Gyeongbu Line with through train service to Seoul Subway Line 1. Since the opening of the Gwacheon Line the trains have been running through to Seoul Subway Line 4. The line was extended as follows:

Date	Section	Length
25 October 1988	Geumjeong–Hanyang Univ. (Ansan)–Ansan	19.5 km
28 July 2000	Ansan–Oido	6.5 km

== Stations ==
Express trains stop at stations marked "●" and pass stations marked "|".

Station number	Station name English	Station name Hangul	Station name Hanja	EX	Transfer		Distance in km from Danggogae	Total distance	Location
↑ Through-services to/from Danggogae via Gwacheon Line and Seoul Metropolitan Subway Line 4 ↑ Express services stop at all stops beyond Geumjeong station.
443	Geumjeong	금정	衿井	●	Seoul Subway Line 1		2.6	45.5	Gunpo-si, Gyeonggi
444	Sanbon	산본	山本	●			2.3	47.8	Gunpo-si, Gyeonggi
445	Surisan	수리산	修理山	|			1.1	48.9	Gunpo-si, Gyeonggi
446	Daeyami	대야미	大夜味	|			2.6	51.5	Gunpo-si, Gyeonggi
447	Banwol	반월	半月	|			2.0	53.5	Ansan-si, Sangnok-gu, Gyeonggi
448	Sangnoksu	상록수	常綠樹	●			3.7	57.2	Ansan-si, Sangnok-gu, Gyeonggi
449	Hanyang Univ. at Ansan	한대앞	漢大앞	|	Suin (shared, 2020)	(2020)	1.5	58.7	Ansan-si, Sangnok-gu, Gyeonggi
450	Jungang	중앙	中央	●	Suin (shared, 2020)		1.6	60.3	Ansan-si, Danwon-gu, Gyeonggi
451	Gojan	고잔	古棧	|	Suin (shared, 2020)		1.4	61.7	Ansan-si, Danwon-gu, Gyeonggi
452	Choji	초지	草芝	●	Suin (shared, 2020)	Seohae Line	1.5	63.2	Ansan-si, Danwon-gu, Gyeonggi
453	Ansan	안산	安山	●	Suin (shared, 2020)	|	1.8	65.0	Ansan-si, Danwon-gu, Gyeonggi
454	Singiloncheon	신길온천	新吉溫泉	|	Suin (shared, 2020)		2.2	67.2	Ansan-si, Danwon-gu, Gyeonggi
455	Jeongwang	정왕	正往	●	Suin (shared, 2020)		2.9	70.1	Siheung-si, Gyeonggi
456	Oido	오이도	烏耳島	●	Suin (shared, 2020)	Suin–Bundang Line	1.4	71.5	Siheung-si, Gyeonggi

== See also ==
- Subways in South Korea
- Seoul Subway Line 4
