= Sanbon =

Coordinates: 35°13′N 128°46′E

- Hangul: 산본신도시
- Hanja: 山本新都市
- Revised Romanization: Sanbon sindosi
- McCune–Reischauer: Sanbon sindosi

Sanbon New Town (Korean: 산본신도시) refers to a planned city surrounding Sanbon-dong and Geumjeong-dong of Gunpo. In August 1988, the Siheung Mountain Main Site Development Plan was established, and in September 1989, the Housing Site Development Plan was approved. By the time it was completed, 41,000 households were constructed to accommodate 164,000 people, and the development density of the mid-density between the subordinate new town (Sanggye district) and the independent new town (Gwacheon) was planned. A variety of housing types, ranging from small rental houses to private large houses, were supplied so that the population class could form a normal distribution.

== History and development ==
In the late 1980s, South Korea faced a worsening housing shortage and a surge in property speculation amid population and income growth and an insufficient housing supply. In response, the government decided to develop large-scale residential areas in the Seoul Metropolitan Subway area as part of its plan to build two million housing units. Five new towns were subsequently developed in Gyeonggi Province, adjacent to Seoul. Sanbon, now part of Gunpo, was one of the areas selected for development. Unlike Bundang and Ilsan, Sanbon, along with Jungdong and Pyeongchon, was developed within an existing urban area and can therefore be described as an "intra-urban new town".

At the time, Gunpo, where Sanbon New Town is located, was part of Gunpo-eup in Siheung County. The area was developing rapidly as an industrial centre due to its proximity to National Route 1, which connected Seoul and Suwon. However, the Sanbon area itself retained its traditional rural character. Agricultural land accounted for 43% of the planned development area, while settlements occupied only about 4%; the remainder consisted of forested land.

The development of Sanbon New Town began with the establishment of the "Siheung Sanbon Housing Site Development Plan" in 1988. Construction began in earnest in 1990, and the project was completed in December 1992.

== Urban planning and land use ==
Sanbon New Town was planned as a new central business area for Gunpo. Of the five first-generation new towns in the Seoul metropolitan area, it had the lowest proportion of land allocated to commercial and business uses. The residential land proportion was relatively high, reflecting the development project's emphasis on providing housing for ordinary residents. The planned area covered 418.9 hectares, of which 191.2 hectares (45.6%) were allocated to residential use, 22.8 hectares (5.4%) to commercial use, 32.5 hectares (7.8%) to schools, 8.7 hectares (2.1%) to public offices, 54.5 hectares (13.0%) to roads, and 63.6 hectares (15.2%) to parks and green spaces.

== Transportation ==
Sanbon station on Seoul Subway Line 4 is located at the centre of the new town, together with Gunpo City Hall and Gunpo Police Station, and the town's main commercial area developed around them.
