= Geumjeong station =

Train station in South Korea

Coordinates: 37°22′21″N 126°56′36″E

금정; Geumjeong
금정; Geumjeong
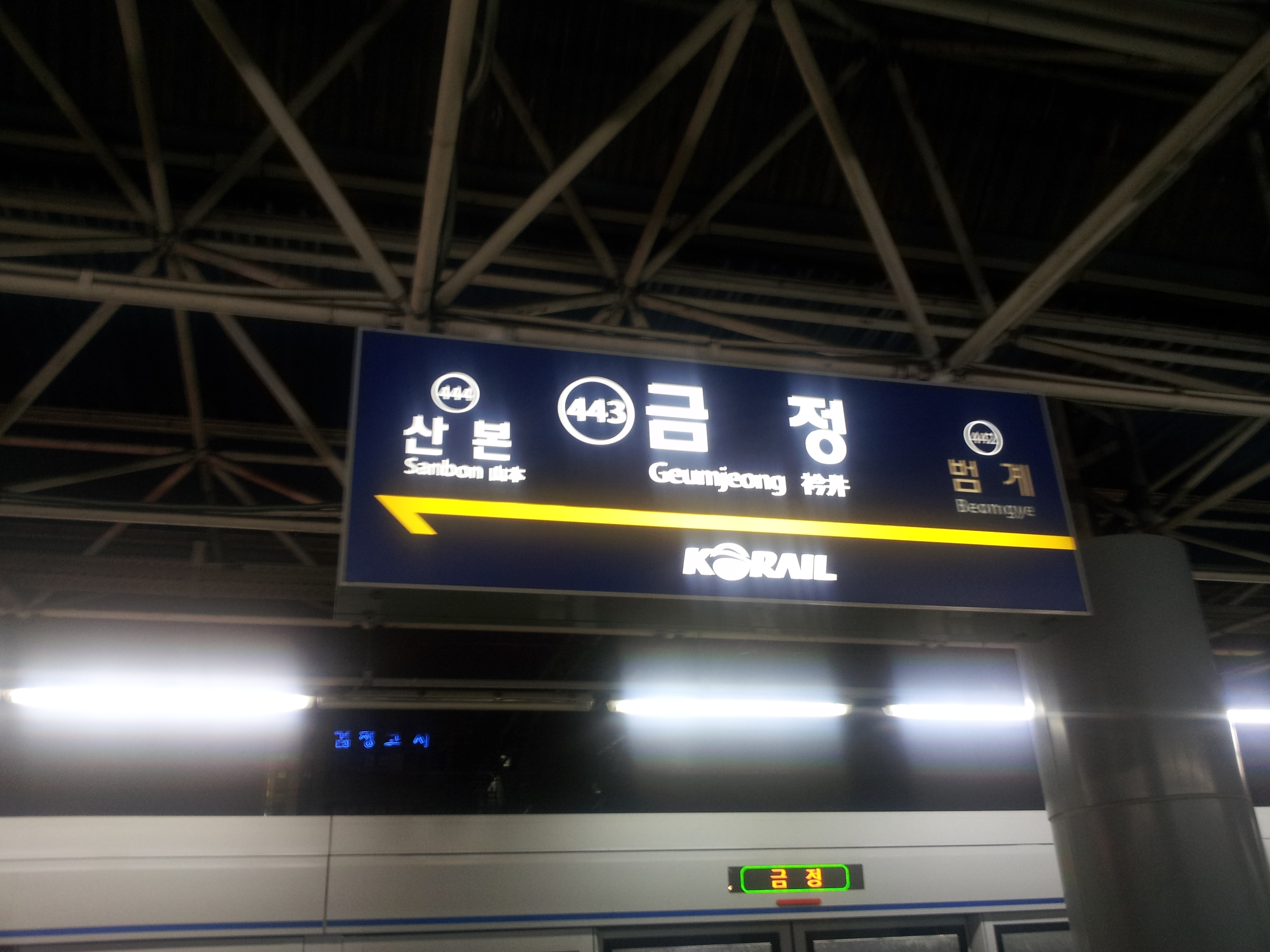
- Station Sign (Line 4)

Korean name
- Hangul: 금정역
- Hanja: 衿井驛
- RR: Geumjeong-yeok
- MR: Kŭmjŏng-yŏk

General information
- Location: 750 Gunporo; 87-1 Geumjeong-dong, Gunpo-si, Gyeonggi-do
- Operator: Korail
- Lines: Line 1 Line 4
- Platforms: 6
- Tracks: 10

Construction
- Structure type: Aboveground

Key dates
- October 25, 1988: Line 1 opened
- April 1, 1994: Line 4 opened

Passengers
- (Daily) Based on Jan-Dec of 2012. Line 1: 58,326
Location

Geumjeong Station (Korean: 금정역) is a ground-level metro station on lines 1 and 4 of the Seoul Subway network in South Korea. The station is in Gunpo, a city approximately 15 km (9.3 mi) south of Seoul in Gyeonggi Province, between the cities of Anyang and Suwon. The name means that the land is covered with waves everywhere and that the water wets women's clothes.

Geumjeong is an important transfer point for passengers travelling to and from southern and western Gyeonggi Province to Seoul Grand Park and Seoul Racecourse Park. The tracks are aligned to allow passengers to transfer between lines 1 and 4 on the same platform.

On December 30, 2019, there was an additional stop at Geumjeong Station on Line 1.

== Structure ==
It is a ground station with a platform of four planes and two pass lines (one cervical line). 4 are the Gyeongbu line operated by the metropolitan subway line 1, 2 are the subway lines between the Kangchun line and the Ansan line, which are operated by the metropolitan subway line 4, or the platform. Both screens had screen doors. There are 8 outlets.

The platform is designed to stop only commuter-type electric trains of lines 1 and 4 because it is a solid-shaped groove installed only on the 2-neck section and the Ansan line used by the No. 1 general railroad line. The Yongsan-Cheonan / Seoul - Cheonan express trains and general passenger trains pass irregularly. The trains can be connected to each other because they use the same platform. However, if you want to transit from one side to the other (the Gunpo and Bangi areas, the Sanbon area and the Honam area), you must go through a historical overpass.

In the past, it was the station on the southern end of the platform, which had only one station room and five overpass-type entrances. However, the transit distance between the nearest intersection and the entrance of the Seoul City Bus Terminal There was an inconvenience to station use because it should use. The construction of the northern part of the bridge connected to the Gangjung Station's three-way overpass started in May 2006.

There is evidence that the Gyeongbu Line commuter express trains may stop here in the future since there are 6 platforms and 10 tracks.

== Station layout ==
↑ Myeonghak (Line 1), Beomgye (Line 4)
| | 12 | | | | 34 |
Gunpo (Line 1), Sanbon (Line 4) ↓

1	Line 4 – Ansan Line	for Sanbon, Hanyang University at Ansan, Ansan and Oido
2	Line 1	for Suwon, Seodongtan, Osan, Pyeongtaek, Cheonan and Sinchang
3	Line 1	for Anyang, Guro, Yongsan, Seoul Station, Cheongnyangni and Kwangwoon University
4	Line 4 – Gwacheon Line	for Sadang, Seoul Station, Hansung University and Jinjeop

== Gallery ==
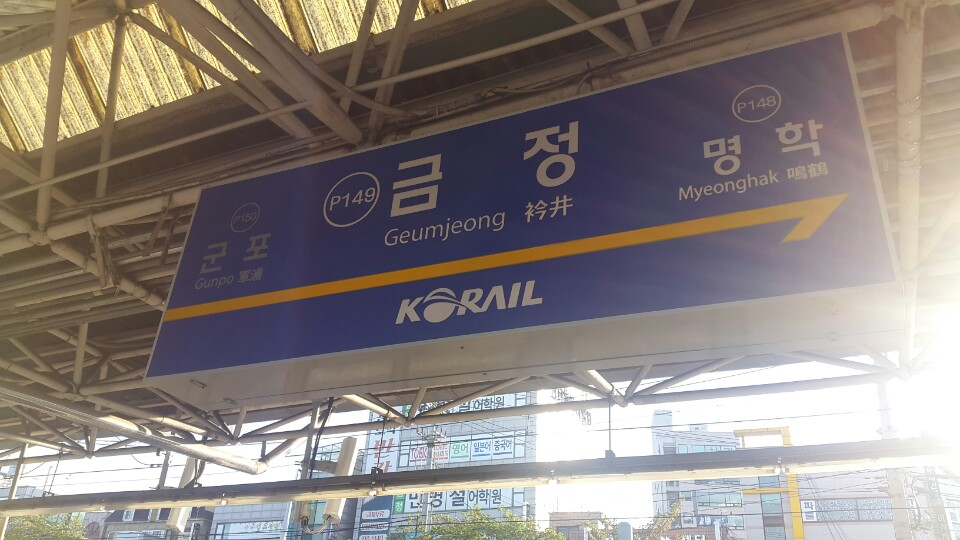
Station Sign (Line 1)

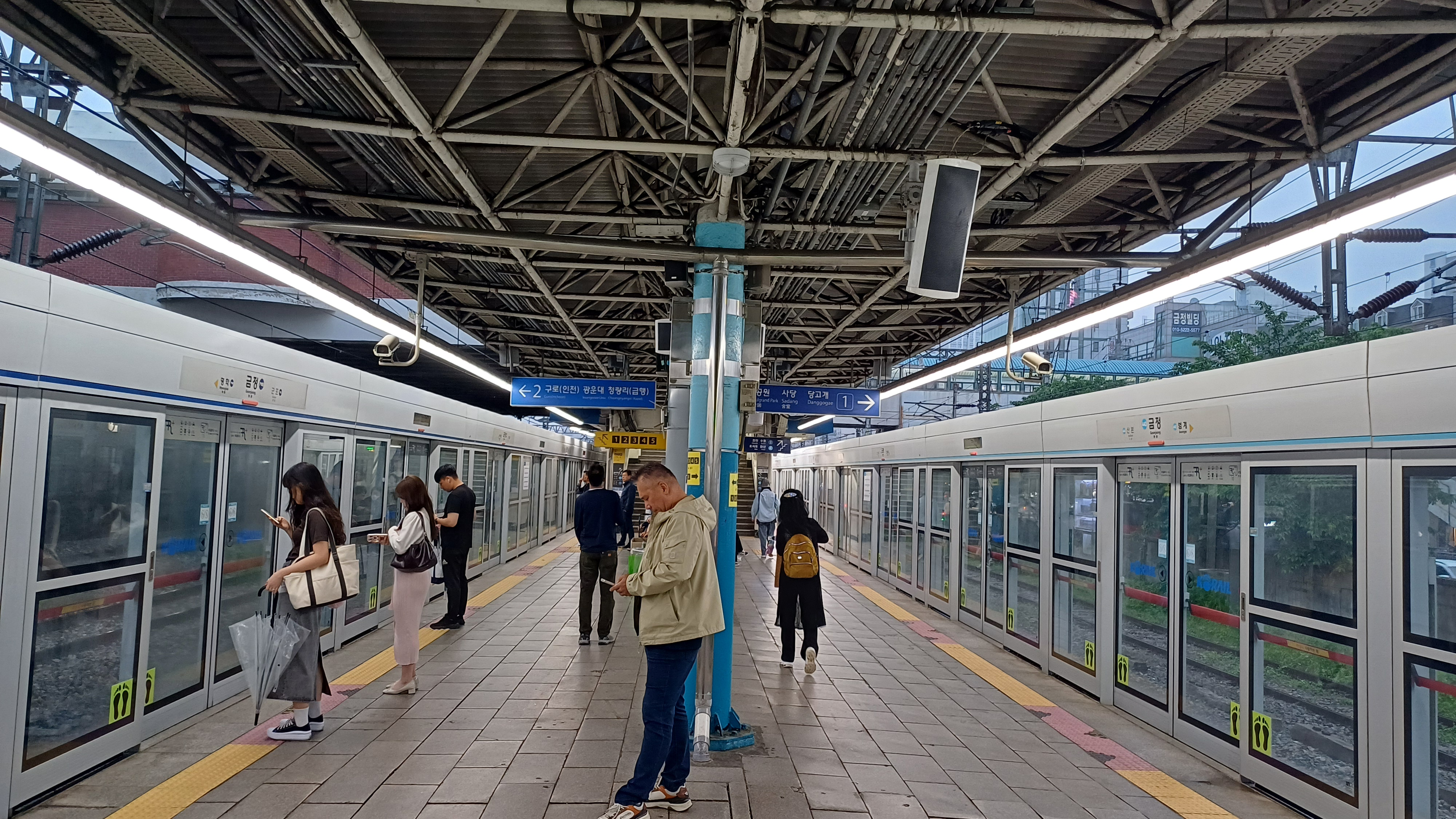
Station Platforms

Preceding station	Seoul Metropolitan Subway	Following station
Myeonghak towards Kwangwoon University	Line 1	Gunpo towards Seodongtan or Sinchang
Anyang towards Cheongnyangni	Line 1 Gyeongbu Express	Uiwang towards Sinchang
Beomgye towards Jinjeop	Line 4	Sanbon towards Oido
