= Jaegung-dong =

South Korean neighbourhood

Coordinates: 37°21′N 126°56′E

- Hangul: 재궁동
- Hanja: 齋宮洞
- RR: Jaegung-dong
- MR: Chaegung-dong

Jaegung-dong (Korean: 재궁동) is a neighbourhood in Gunpo, Gyeonggi, South Korea. It is the location of the Gunpo city hall.
