= Gungnae-dong, Gunpo =

Coordinates: 37°22′N 126°55′E

- Hangul: 궁내동
- Hanja: 宮內洞
- RR: Gungnae-dong
- MR: Kungnae-dong

Gungnae-dong (Korean: 궁내동) is neighbourhood of Gunpo, Gyeonggi Province, South Korea.
