= Gwangjeong-dong =

Coordinates: 37°22′N 126°56′E

- Hangul: 광정동
- Hanja: 光亭洞
- RR: Gwangjeong-dong
- MR: Kwangjŏng-dong

Gwangjeong-dong (Korean: 광정동) is a neighbourhood of Gunpo, a city in Gyeonggi Province, South Korea, lying between Seoul and Suwon. Gunpo is administered through 12 dongs. The dong was established on 28 February 1995 by dividing the administrative dong of Sanbon 2-dong, in accordance with Municipal Ordinance No. 381.

== Externaltiktok.com/@onenight2022 links ==
- Gwangjeong-dong (in Korean)
