= Sanbon-dong, Gunpo =

Sanbon-dong
- Dong
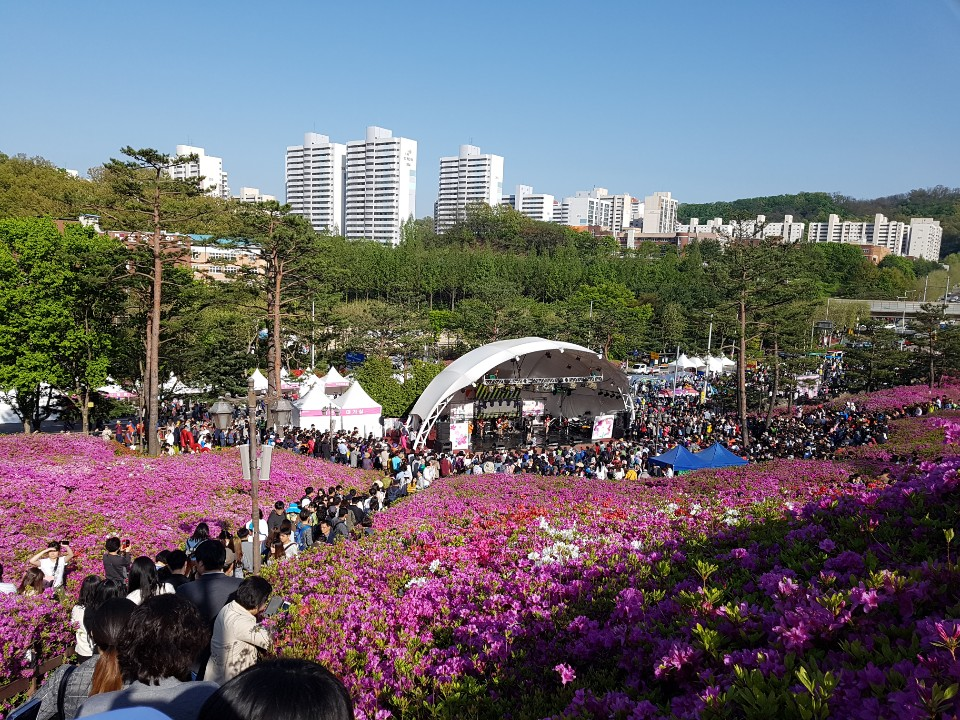
- Sanbon-dong in South Korea

- Location within South Korea
- Country: South Korea
- Province: Gyeonggi
- Satellite city: Gunpo
- Formed: 1914

Area
  - Total: 2.05 km^{2} (0.79 sq mi)

Population
  - Total: 50,000

Korean name
- Hangul: 산본동
- Hanja: 山本洞
- RR: Sanbon-dong
- MR: Sanbon-dong

Sanbon-dong (Korean: 산본동) is a dong, (Note: 'dong' is one of the administrative districts. it is area that belongs to 'Gu' of 'Si'. it also be called 'administrate dong'. and is distinguished from 'legal dong' All of administrative districts have office of dong. it works for resident in that area.) or neighborhood, in Gunpo, a satellite city of Seoul in Gyeonggi Province, South Korea. Its total area is 2.05 square kilometres (0.79 sq mi). Due to its population of more than 50,000, for administrative purposes the area is divided into two dong, Sanbon 1-dong and Sanbon 2-dong. Its name can be translated as "the mountain's root," and refers to its position at the base of Surisan's eastern flank. On the other side of Surisan (475 metres (1,558 ft)) lies Anyang City.

The administrative entity of Sanbon was formed in 1914, as part of a general nationwide consolidation of local government under the Japanese occupation. At that time it was Sanbon-ri, a rural precinct of Siheung County. When it became part of the new Gunpo City in 1989, its status was changed from ri to dong. The name is believed to derive from Sanjeo, "low on the mountain," which was first used to describe the region in 1789.

Seoul Subway Line 4 stops at Sanbon Station. Other landmarks include various Joseon Dynasty relics: a large kiln site, a shrine of the royal Jeonju Yi clan, and the tomb of 17th-century scholar Hoam Yi Gi-jo.

There is an active garbage incineration plant (군포환경관리소) in Sanbon-dong.

== See also ==
- Geography of South Korea
- Subdivisions of South Korea
