= Beomgye station =

Station of the Seoul Metropolitan Subway

Coordinates: 37°23′22.74″N 126°57′2.21″E

범계; Beomgye
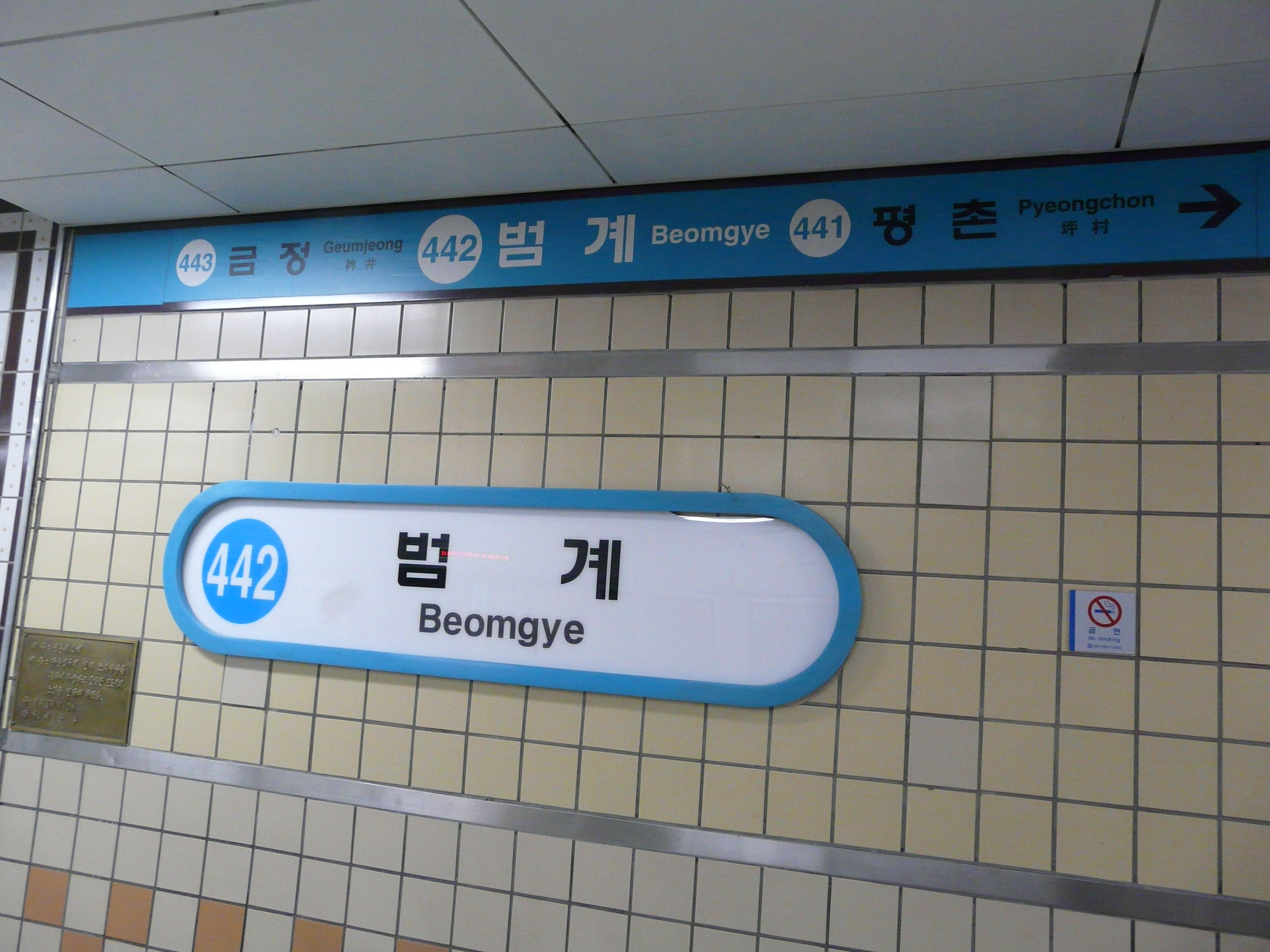
- Station nameplate

Korean name
- Hangul: 범계역
- Hanja: 범계驛
- Revised Romanization: Beomgye-yeok
- McCune–Reischauer: Pŏmgye-yŏk

General information
- Location: 1039-1 Hogye-dong, Dongan-gu, Anyang-si, Gyeonggi-do
- Operator: Korail
- Line: Line 4
- Platforms: 2
- Tracks: 2

Construction
- Structure type: Underground

History
- Opened: January 15, 1993 (as part of Line 1)

Key dates
- April 1, 1994: Service transferred to Line 4
Location

Beomgye Station is a station on Line 4 of the Seoul Subway network. It is between Geumjeong station and Pyeongchon station, in a newer area of Anyang, Gyeonggi Province and, heading away from Seoul, it is the last underground station on this line. It opens at 4:30 A.M. Beomgye Station features an area known as "Beomgye Rodeo," which is well known for its shopping, active nightlife, and array of traditional Korean restaurants. It is connected to a Lotte Department Store and Newcore outlet. Lotte Department Store has been open since 2012. There are 9 exits. There are exits 1, 2, 3, 4, 4-1, 5, 6, 7, and 8.

The name of the station literally means "A river full of tigers."

== Station layout ==
G	Street level	Exit

L1; Concourse	Lobby	Customer Service, Shops, Vending machines, ATMs

L2; Platforms	Side platform, doors will open on the left
L2; Platforms	Southbound	Gwacheon Line toward Oido (Geumjeong) →
L2; Platforms	Northbound	← Gwacheon Line toward Jinjeop (Pyeongchon)
L2; Platforms	Side platform, doors will open on the left

Preceding station	Seoul Metropolitan Subway	Following station
Pyeongchon towards Jinjeop	Line 4	Geumjeong towards Oido
