= Suri-dong =

Neighbourhood

- Hangul: 수리동
- Hanja: 修理洞
- RR: Suri-dong
- MR: Suri-dong

Suri-dong (Korean: 수리동) is neighbourhood of Gunpo, Gyeonggi Province, South Korea.
