= Surisan station =

Station of the Seoul Metropolitan Subway

Coordinates: 37.35018°N 126.92546°E

| 수리산; Surisan |
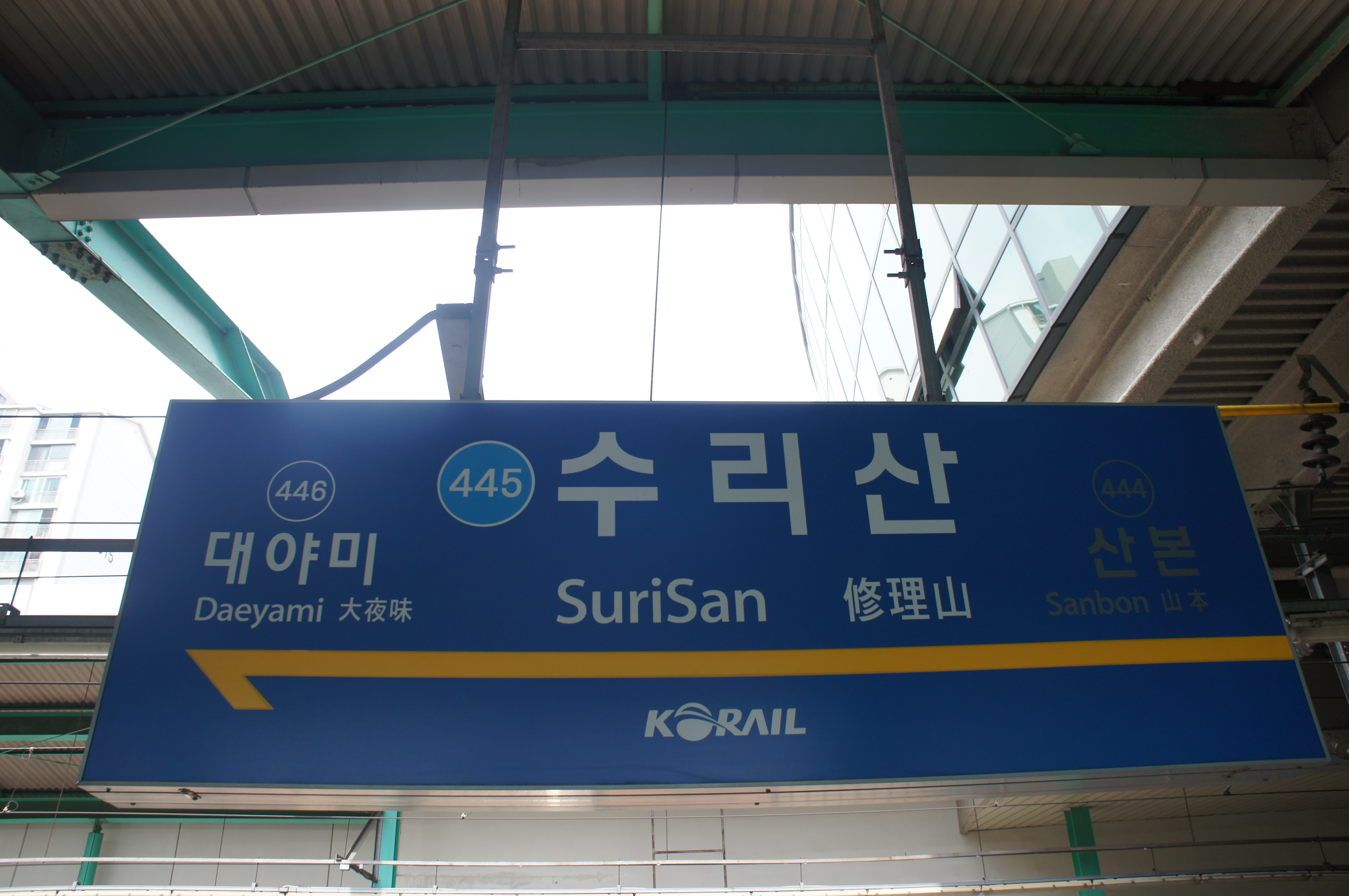

Korean name
- Hangul: 수리산역
- Hanja: 修理山驛
- RR: Surisan-yeok
- MR: Surisan-yŏk

General information
- Location: 1155-5 Suri-dong, 371 Beonyeong-ro; Gunpo-si, Gyeonggi-do
- Operator: Korail
- Line: Line 4
- Platforms: 2
- Tracks: 2

Construction
- Structure type: Aboveground

Key dates
- July 18, 2003: Line 4 opened
Location

Surisan station is a railway station on Seoul Subway Line 4. It is between Sanbon station and Daeyami station. Opened on July 18, 2003, Surisan station's name comes from Surisan, which is not too close to the station. It was also made to reflect the opinions of local residents.

== Station layout ==
| L2; Platforms | Side platform, doors will open on the left |
| L2; Platforms | Southbound | Ansan Line toward Oido (Daeyami) → |
| L2; Platforms | Northbound | ← Ansan Line toward Jinjeop (Sanbon) |
| L2; Platforms | Side platform, doors will open on the left |

| L1; Concourse | Lobby | Customer service, shops, vending machines, ATMs |

| G | Street level | Exit |

== amenities ==
1. Restroom outside the ticket gate
2. Several vending machines

== Surrounding Facilities ==
1.Homeplus (홈플러스 익스프레스군포수리산역점), 1156-8 Sanbon-dong, Gunpo-si, Gyeonggi-do
2.CU (CU 군포한라점) 378 Beonyeong-ro, Gunpo-si, Gyeonggi-do

| Preceding station | Seoul Metropolitan Subway | Following station |
|---|---|---|
| Sanbon towards Jinjeop | Line 4 | Daeyami towards Oido |
