= Geumjeong-dong =

Locality in South Korea

Coordinates: 37°22′N 126°57′E

- Hangul: 금정동
- Hanja: 衿井洞
- RR: Geumjeong-dong
- MR: Kŭmjŏng-dong

Geumjeong-dong (Korean: 금정동) is neighbourhood of Gunpo, Gyeonggi Province, South Korea.
