= Sanbon station =

Train station in South Korea

Coordinates: 37.35809°N 126.93301°E

산본 (원광대산본병원); Sanbon (Wonkwang Univ. Sanbon Hospital)
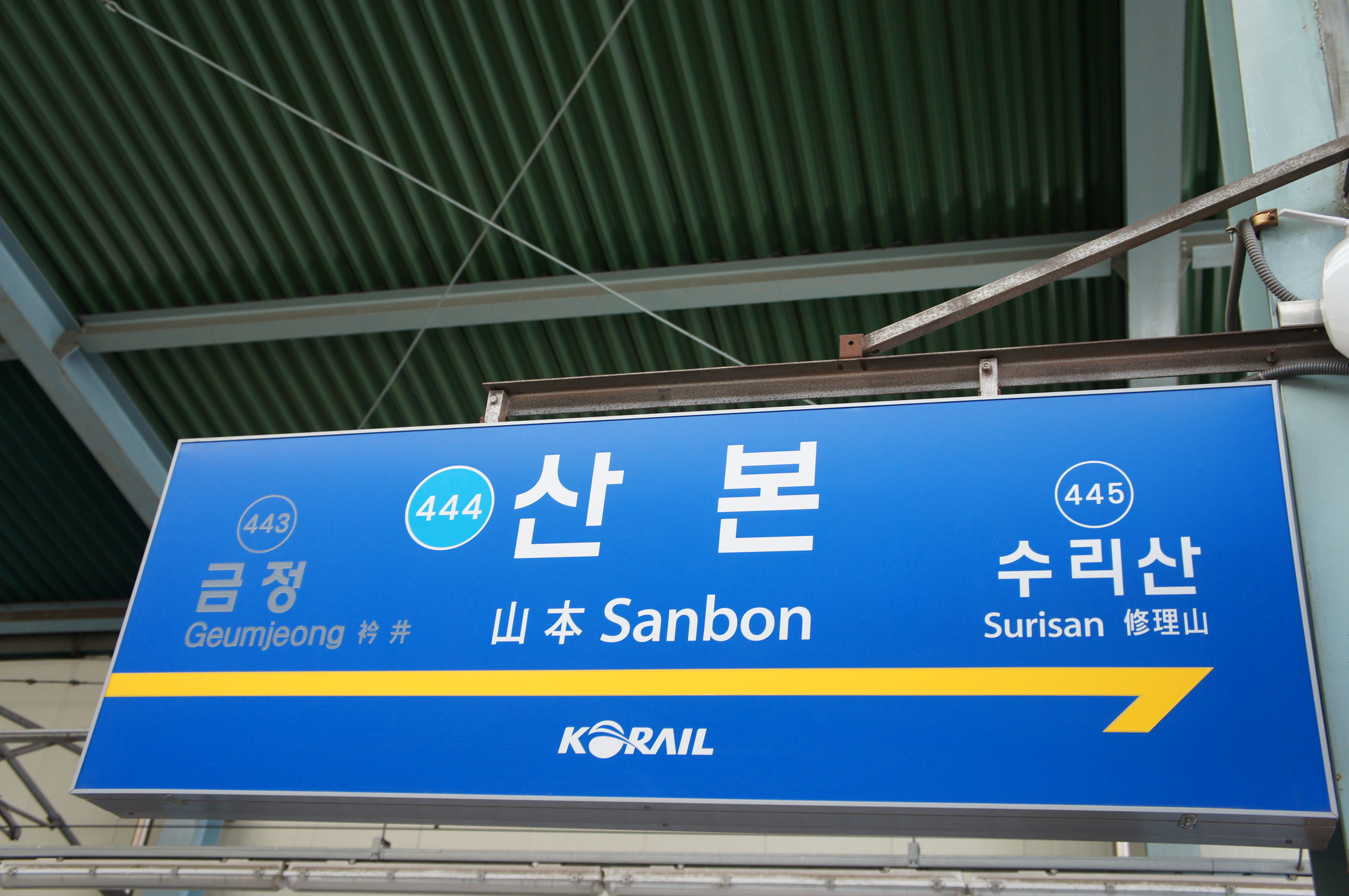

Korean name
- Hangul: 산본역
- Hanja: 山本驛
- Revised Romanization: Sanbon-yeok
- McCune–Reischauer: Sanbon-yŏk

General information
- Location: 1231 Sanbon-dong, 502 Beonyeongno, Gunpo-si, Gyeonggi-do
- Operated by: Korail
- Line: Line 4
- Platforms: 2
- Tracks: 4

Construction
- Structure type: Aboveground

History
- Opened: May 1, 1992 (as part of Line 1)

Key dates
- April 1, 1994: Service transferred to Line 4
Location

Sanbon station (Korean: 산본역) is a railway station on Seoul Subway Line 4. It is located in Gunpo city.

It is a main station to access 'Sanbon', a planned satellite city of Korea. It is between Geumjeong station and Surisan station and was opened on 1 May 1992. In 2015, Gunpo began to construct eight escalators that would be completed in the end of 2015. Sanbon Station is connected with New Core outlet.

== Nearby attractions ==
Visitors to Gunpo may be surprised by the size of their exit from Sanbon station or approaching the main shopping street via the outer ring road. With the development of Sanbon, the newly developed central commercial area is one of the most visited places in Gunpo.

The azalea garden in Su-dong, Gunpo city is an artificial azalea complex. The site, which has been constructed by planting 150 million yuan of asset, is now becoming a famous spot in Gunpo city.

== Station layout ==
L2; Platforms	Side platform, doors will open on the left
L2; Platforms	Southbound	Ansan Line toward Oido (Surisan) (Local) or (sangnoksu) (Express) →
L2; Platforms	Northbound Local/Express	← Ansan Line toward Jinjeop (Geumjeong)
L2; Platforms	Side platform, doors will open on the left

L1; Concourse	Lobby	Customer Service, Shops, Vending machines, ATMs

G	Street level	Exit

Preceding station	Seoul Metropolitan Subway	Following station
Geumjeong towards Jinjeop	Line 4	Surisan towards Oido
Geumjeong towards Buramsan	Line 4 Express	Sangnoksu towards Oido
