= Daeyami station =

Train station in South Korea

Coordinates: 37.32824°N 126.91731°E

대야미; Daeyami
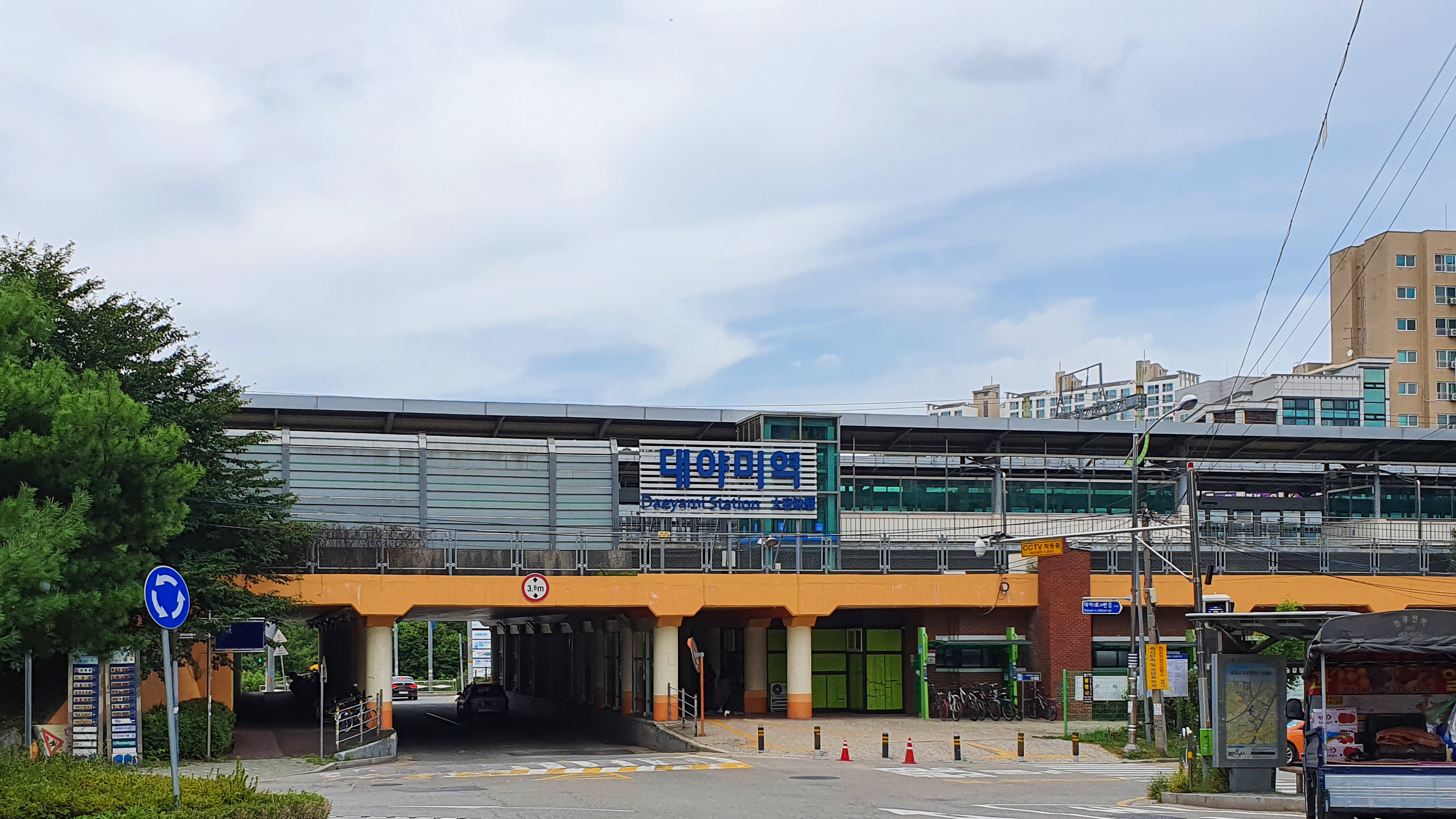

Korean name
- Hangul: 대야미역
- Hanja: 大夜味驛
- Revised Romanization: Daeyami-yeok
- McCune–Reischauer: Taeyami-yŏk

General information
- Location: 233-4 Daeyami-dong, Gunpo-si, Gyeonggi-do
- Operated by: Korail
- Line: Line 4
- Platforms: 2
- Tracks: 2

Construction
- Structure type: At-grade

History
- Opened: October 25, 1988 (as part of Line 1)

Key dates
- April 1, 1994: Service transferred to Line 4

Services
Preceding station	Seoul Metropolitan Subway	Following station
Surisan towards Jinjeop	Line 4	Banwol towards Oido
Location

Daeyami station is a railway station on Seoul Subway Line 4, located in Gunpo, South Korea. It is between Surisan station and Banwol station. The station only serves Northbound and Southbound services on one line. The name of the subway station comes from its local name. Regional names refer to the size of small fields.

== Surroundings ==
Lake Banwol is located at the very bottom of the Daiya-dong neighborhood. It was completed in 1957, and the water in the northwestern wing of the house, the semimol, and the rocks of the provincial bank flows to the southeast direction and flows to Lake Banwol.

== Station layout ==
L2; Platforms	Side platform, doors will open on the left
L2; Platforms	Southbound	Ansan Line toward Oido (Banwol) →
L2; Platforms	Northbound	← Ansan Line toward Jinjeop (Surisan)
L2; Platforms	Side platform, doors will open on the left

L1; Concourse	Lobby	Customer Service, Shops, Vending machines, ATMs

G	Street level	Exit
