= Sangnoksu station =

Metro station in Ansan, South Korea

Coordinates: 37.30271°N 126.86641°E

상록수 (안산대학교); Sangnoksu (Ansan Univ.)
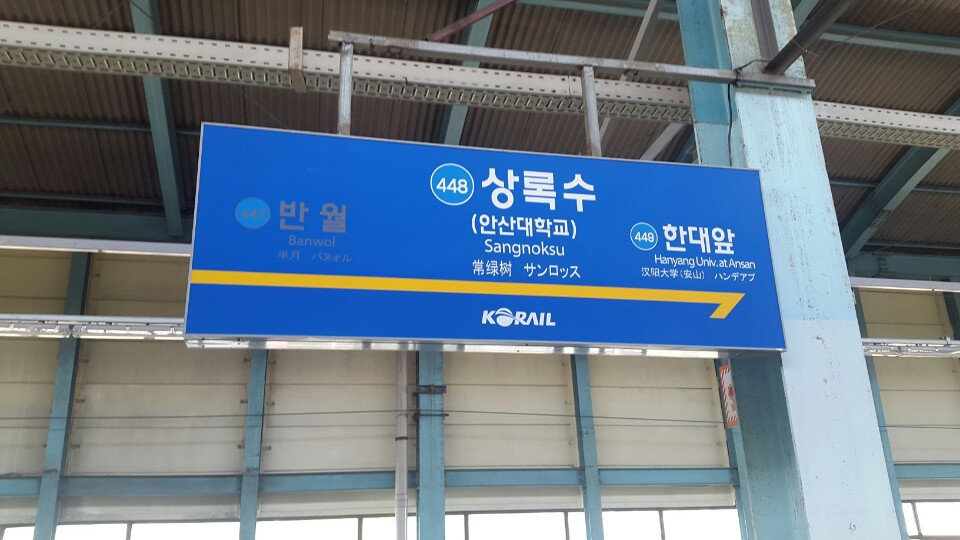

Korean name
- Hangul: 상록수역
- Hanja: 常綠樹驛
- Revised Romanization: Sangnoksu-yeok
- McCune–Reischauer: Sangnoksu-yŏk

General information
- Location: 409 Bono-dong, 61 Sangnoksuro, Sangnok-gu, Ansan-si, Gyeonggi-do
- Operator: Korail
- Line: Line 4
- Platforms: 2
- Tracks: 4

Construction
- Structure type: Aboveground

History
- Opened: October 25, 1988 (as part of Line 1)

Key dates
- April 1, 1994: Service transferred to Line 4
Location

Sangnoksu station is a railway station on Seoul Subway Line 4. The station is located in Ansan-si, Gyeonggi-do. It is located between Banwol station and Hanyang Univ. at Ansan station. Its station subname is Ansan Univ.

It is the southernmost station of the Seoul subway line 4.

Sangnoksu means "Evergreen Tree". The station, just like its Sangnok-gu neighborhood, is named after the book Sangnoksu (1935) by Sim Hun.

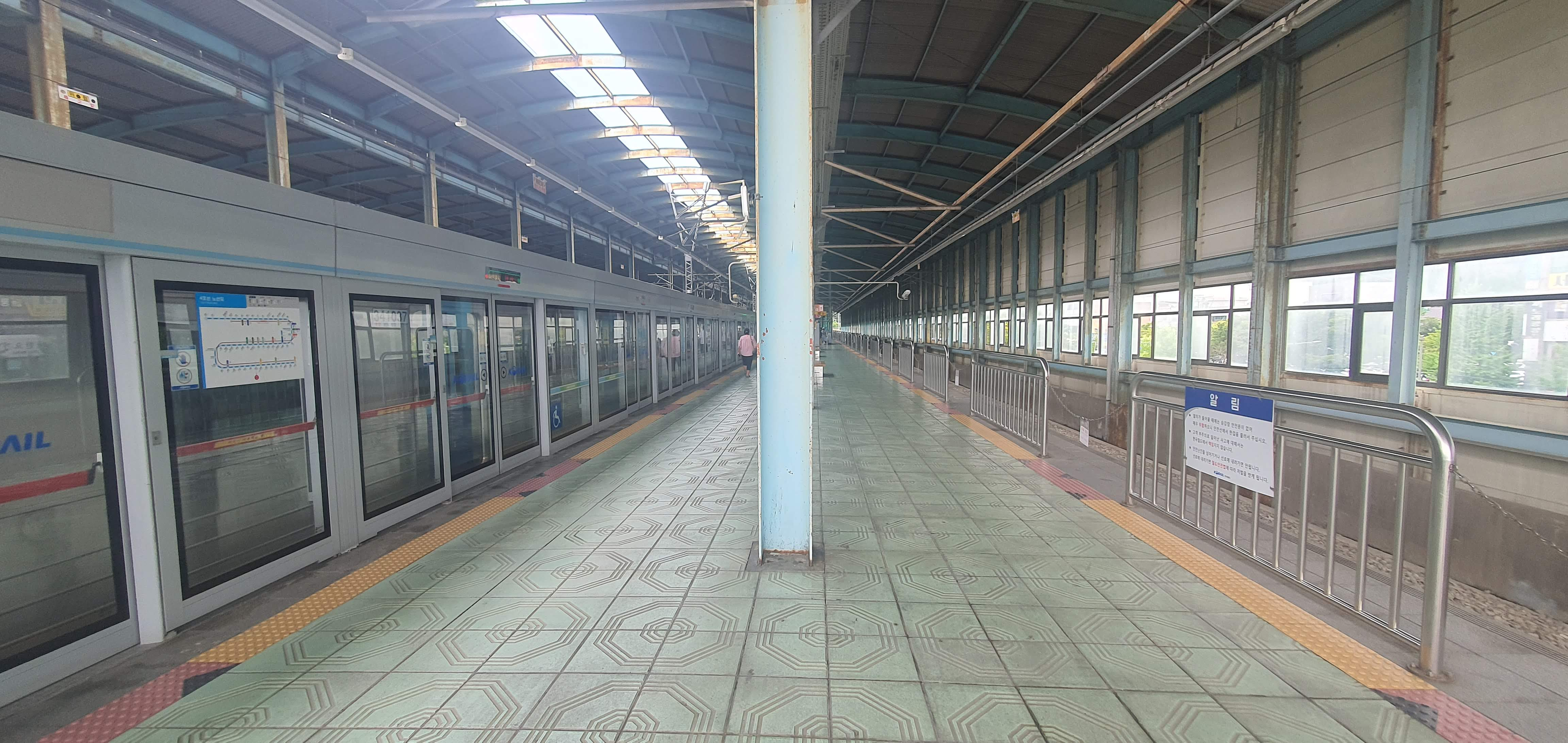
Platform

== Surroundings ==
Around the station, there are 'Maehwa Elementary School, Sangro Elementary School, Sangro Middle School, Ansan University, Ansan Botanical Garden, and Danwon Sculpture Park.

== Station layout ==
L2
Platforms
No Service
Island platform, doors will open on the left, right
Southbound Express/Local
Ansan Line toward Oido

(Jungang) (Express) or (Hanyang Univ. at Ansan) (Local) →

Northbound Express/Local
← Ansan Line toward Jinjeop or Buramsan (Sanbon) (Express) or (Banwol) (Local)
Island platform, doors will open on the left, right
No Service

L1; Concourse	Lobby	Customer Service, Shops, Vending machines, ATMs

G	Street level	Exit

Preceding station	Seoul Metropolitan Subway	Following station
Banwol towards Jinjeop	Line 4	Hanyang University at Ansan towards Oido
Sanbon towards Buramsan	Line 4 Express	Jungang towards Oido
