= Hansung University station =

Train station in Seoul, South Korea

Coordinates: 37.58842°N 127.00618°E

한성대입구 (삼선교); Hansung Univ. (Samseongyo)
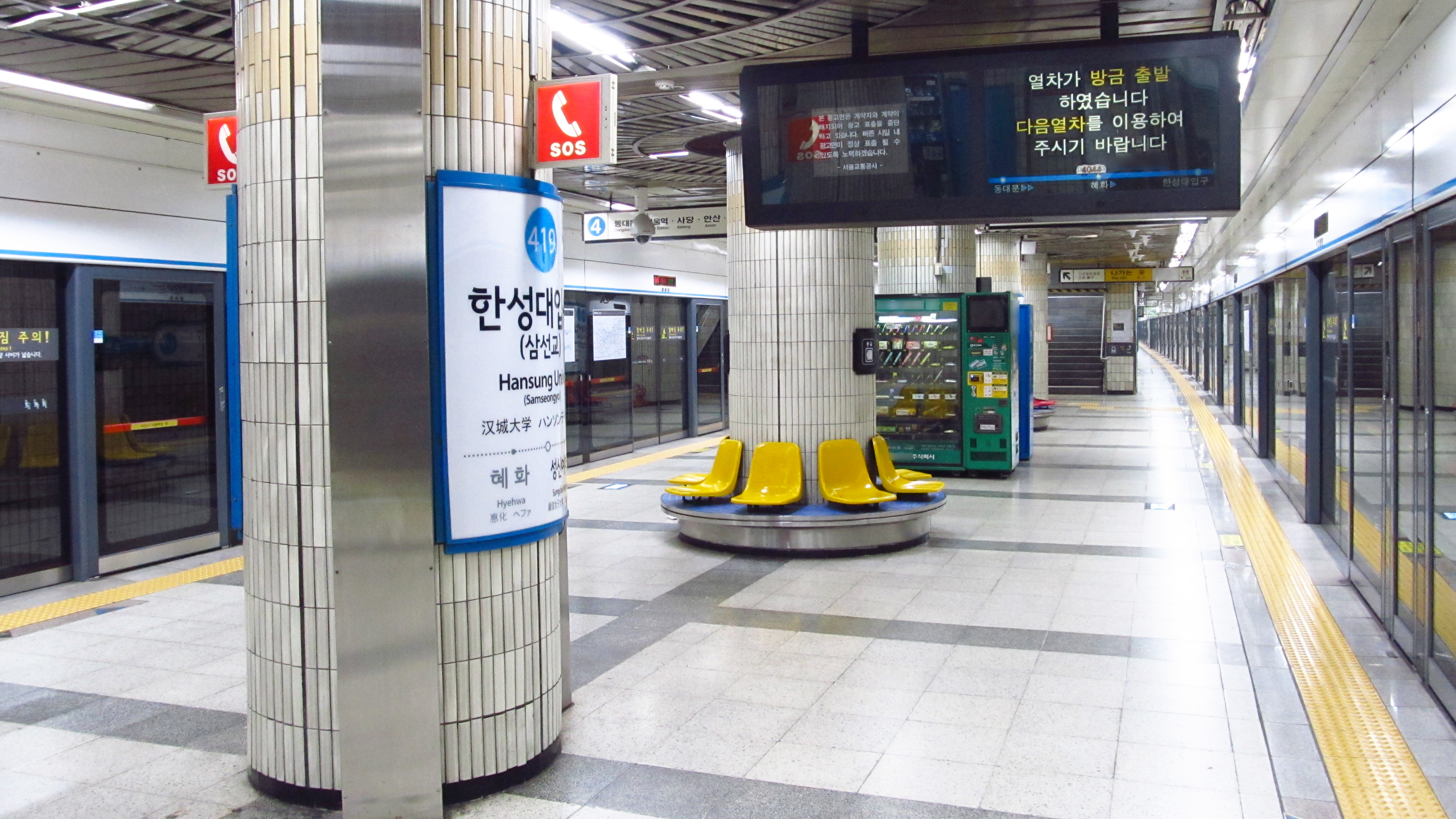
- Station platform

Korean name
- Hangul: 한성대입구역
- Hanja: 漢城大入口驛
- Revised Romanization: Hanseongdaeipgu-yeok
- McCune–Reischauer: Hansŏngdaeipku-yŏk

General information
- Location: 1 Samseongyo-ro, Seongbuk-gu, Seoul
- Operated by: Seoul Metro
- Line(s): Line 4
- Platforms: 1
- Tracks: 2

Construction
- Structure type: Underground

Key dates
- April 20, 1985: Line 4 opened

Passengers
- (Daily) Based on Jan-Dec of 2012. Line 4: 34,160

Hansung University Station (Korean: 한성대입구역) is a station on the Seoul Subway Line 4. Its station subname is Samseongyo. The university with the same name is about a half-mile away from this station. The Holy Spirit Campus of the Catholic University of Korea is located closer, to the southwest.

== Station layout ==
G	Street level	Exit

L1; Concourse	Lobby	Customer Service, Shops, Vending machines, ATMs

L2; Platforms	Northbound	← Line 4 toward Jinjeop (Sungshin Women's Univ.)
L2; Platforms	Island platform, doors will open on the left
L2; Platforms	Southbound	Line 4 toward Oido (Hyehwa) →

Preceding station	Seoul Metropolitan Subway	Following station
Sungshin Women's University towards Jinjeop	Line 4	Hyehwa towards Oido
