= Hanyang University at Ansan station =

Metro station in Ansan, South Korea

| 한대앞; Hanyang Univ. at Ansan |
| 한대앞; Hanyang Univ. at Ansan |
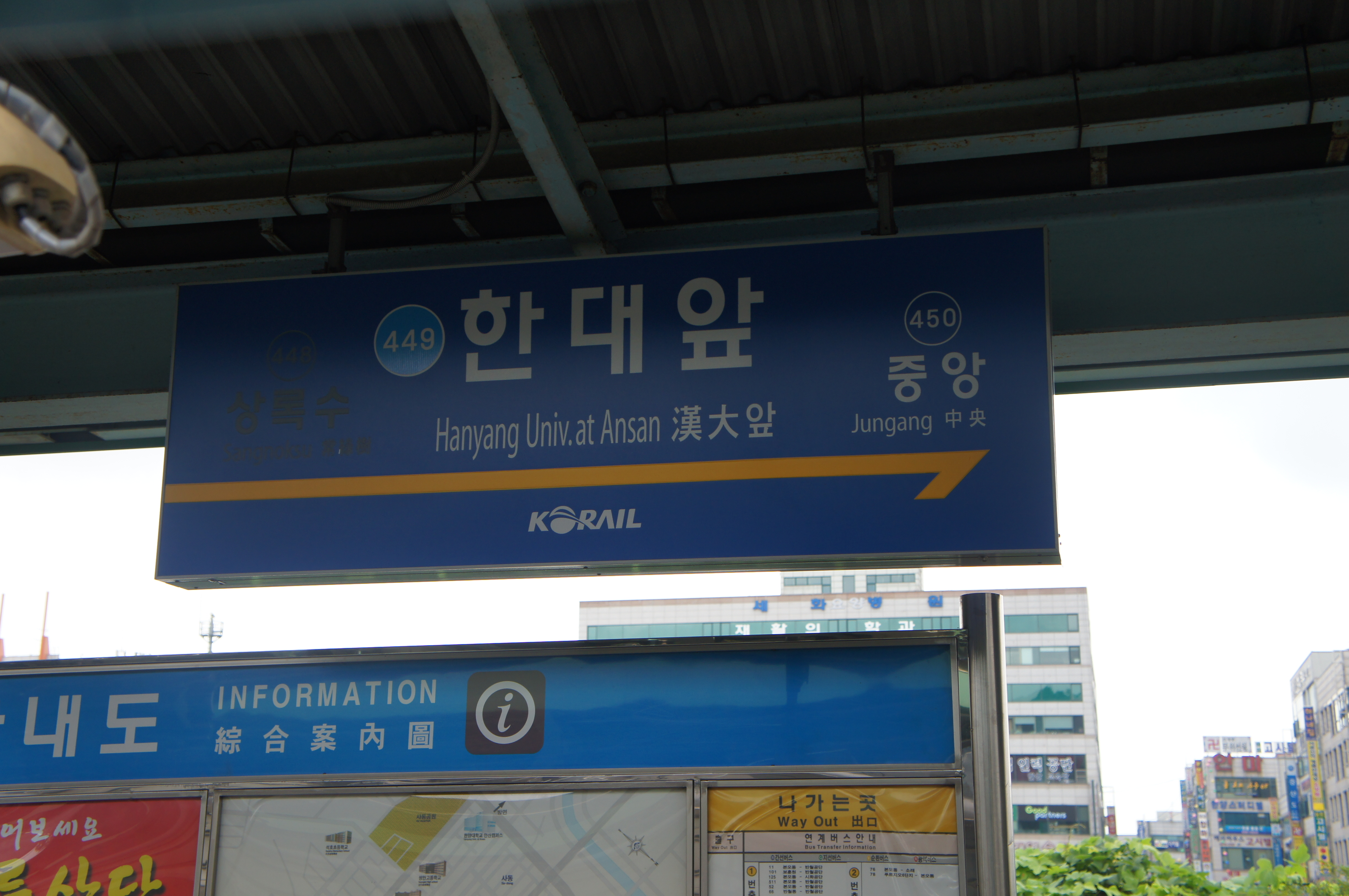
- Station Sign

Korean name
- Hangul: 한대앞역
- Hanja: 漢大앞驛
- Revised Romanization: Handaeap-yeok
- McCune–Reischauer: Handaeap-yŏk

General information
- Location: San 17-3 I-dong, 337 Chungjangno, Sangnok-gu, Ansan-si, Gyeonggi-do
- Coordinates: 37°18′35.18″N 126°51′12.89″E
- Operator: Korail
- Lines: Line 4 Suin–Bundang Line
- Platforms: 2
- Tracks: 2

Construction
- Structure type: Aboveground

History
- Opened: August 5, 1937; October 25, 1988 (as part of Line 1)

Key dates
- April 1, 1994: Line 1 service transferred to Line 4
- September 12, 2020: Suin–Bundang Line opened
Location

Hanyang University at Ansan station (Korean: 한대앞역) is a station on Seoul Subway Line 4 & the Suin–Bundang Line in Ansan-si, Gyeonggi-do, South Korea. It is named after the city's ERICA campus of Hanyang University. Unlike the name of the station, Hanyang University is not right in front of the station. Hanyang University shuttle buses stop in front of the station. Buses usually take students from the station to the university every 10 minutes on weekdays and every 30 minutes on weekends.

This station was the planned southeastern terminus of the section of the Suin Line; it became a transfer point between Line 4 and the Suin Line when construction on the Suin Line was completed in 2019. Opening was delayed until autumn 2020, when it became part of the Suin–Bundang Line.

== Station layout ==
| L2; Platforms | Side platform, doors will open on the left |
| L2; Platforms | Southbound | Ansan Line toward Oido (Jungang) → |
| L2; Platforms | Northbound | ← Ansan Line toward Jinjeop (Sangnoksu) |
| L2; Platforms | Side platform, doors will open on the left |

| L1; Concourse | Lobby | Customer Service, Shops, Vending machines, ATMs |

| G | Street level | Exit |

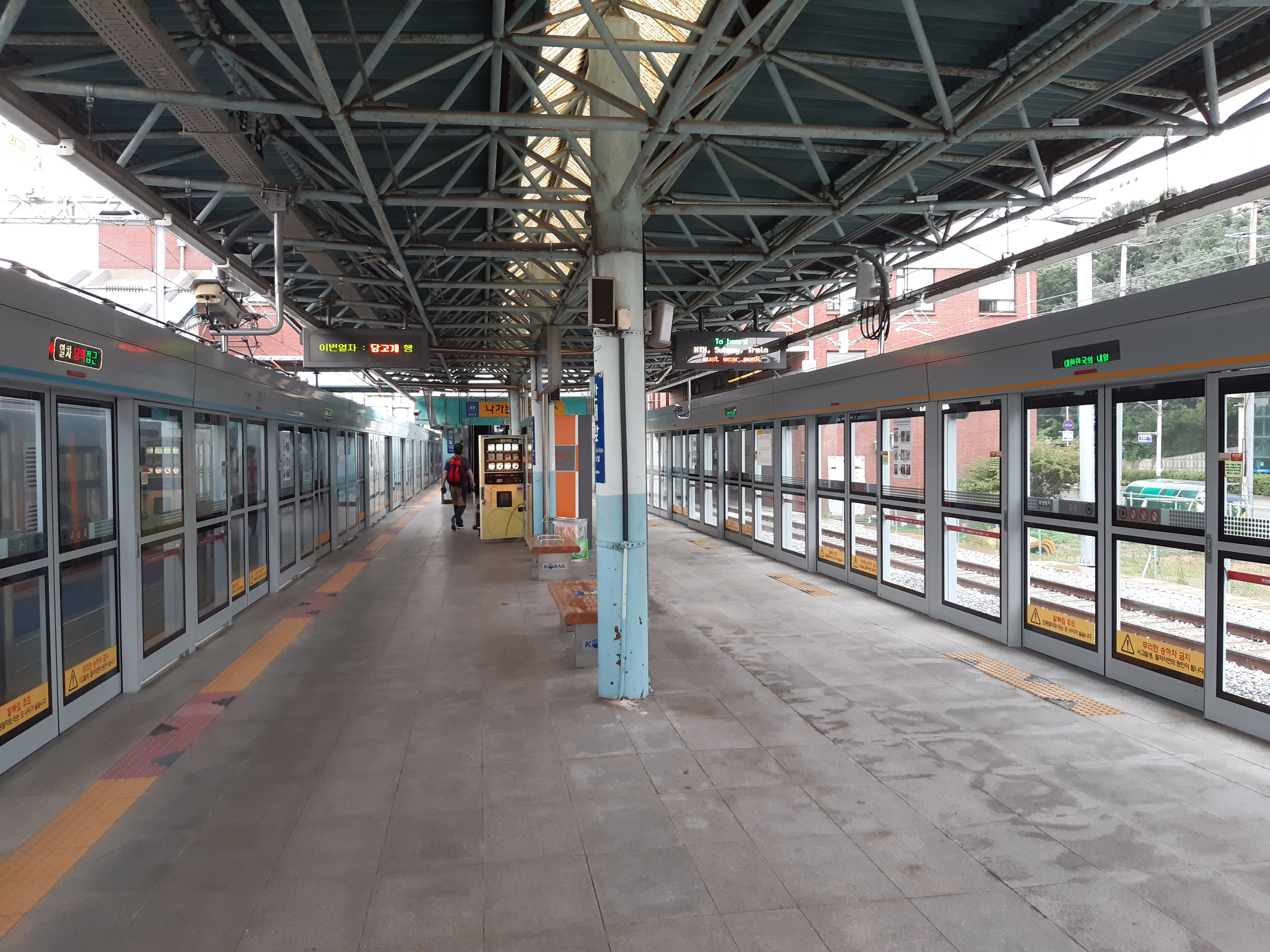
Hanyang University at Ansan Station platform

== Name ==
At the time of its opening, the station was named "Handae" and "Handaeap", which was later changed to "Hanyang Univ. at Ansan" in 2001.

Even now, the sign near exit 1 is still written 'Handae-ap' because it is old.

== Station information ==
There is Ansan Agricultural and Marine Products Wholesale Market near Exit 1. A small commercial district is formed at Exit 2, where you can take the shuttle bus to Hanyang University's ERICA Campus. If you exit through Exit 2, there are two outdoor restrooms.

| Preceding station | Seoul Metropolitan Subway | Following station |
|---|---|---|
| Sangnoksu towards Jinjeop | Line 4 | Jungang towards Oido |
| Sari towards Cheongnyangni | Suin–Bundang Line | Jungang towards Incheon |
