= Banwol station =

Metro station in Ansan, South Korea

Coordinates: 37.31213°N 126.90353°E

| 반월; Banwol |
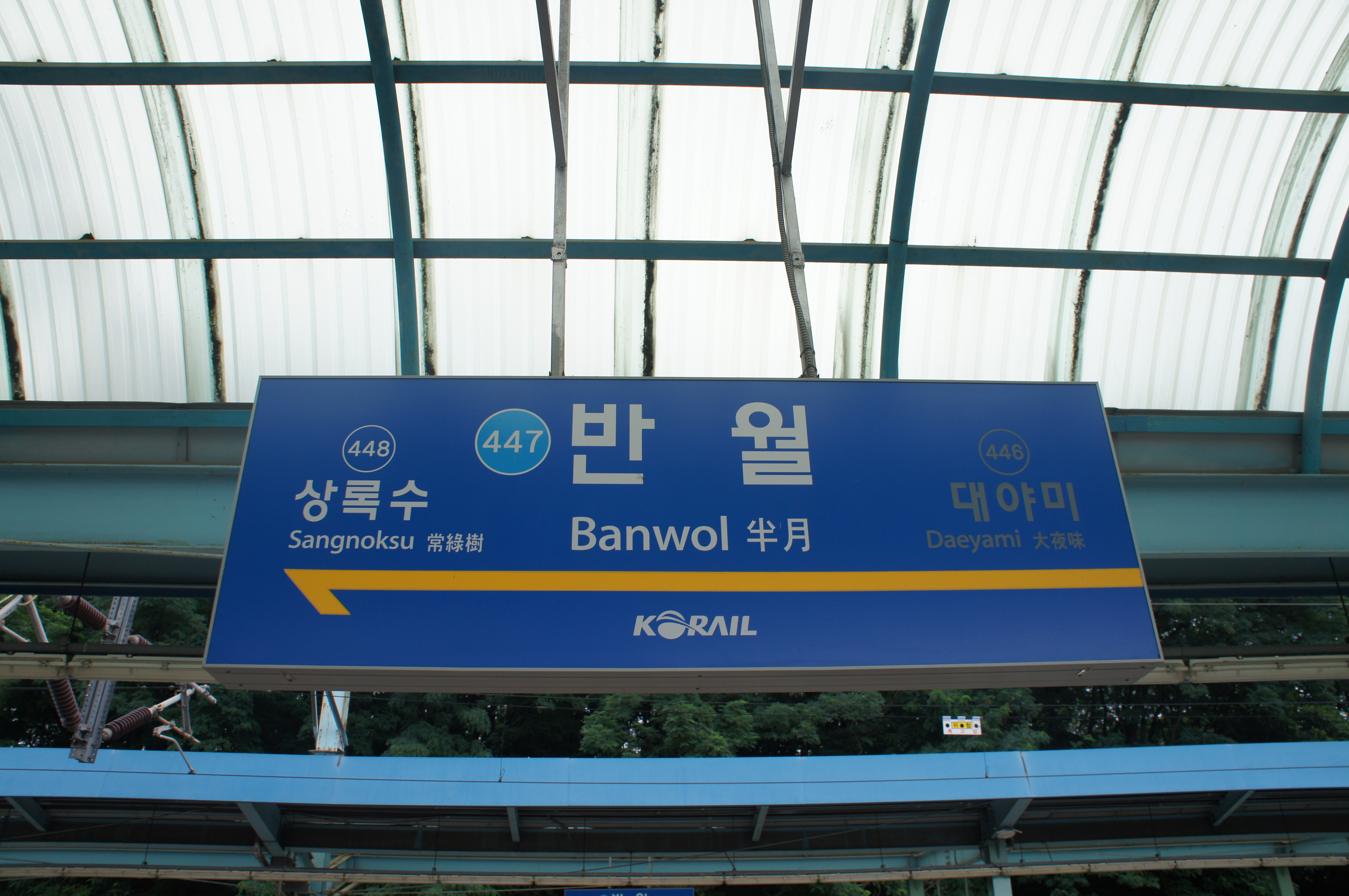

Korean name
- Hangul: 반월역
- Hanja: 半月驛
- Revised Romanization: Banwol-yeok
- McCune–Reischauer: Panwŏl-yŏk

General information
- Location: San 62-1 Geongeon-dong, 179 Geongeonno, Sangnok-gu, Ansan-si, Gyeonggi-do
- Operated by: Korail
- Line: Line 4
- Platforms: 2
- Tracks: 2

Construction
- Structure type: Aboveground

History
- Opened: October 25, 1988 (as part of Line 1)

Key dates
- April 1, 1994: Service transferred to Line 4
Location

Banwol station is a railway station on Seoul Subway Line 4 in Ansan.

== Station layout ==
| L2; Platforms | Side platform, doors will open on the left |
| L2; Platforms | Southbound | Ansan Line toward Oido (Sangnoksu) → |
| L2; Platforms | Northbound | ← Ansan Line toward Jinjeop (Daeyami) |
| L2; Platforms | Side platform, doors will open on the left |

| L1; Concourse | Lobby | Customer service, shops, vending machines, ATMs |

| G | Street level | Exit |

| Preceding station | Seoul Metropolitan Subway | Following station |
|---|---|---|
| Daeyami towards Jinjeop | Line 4 | Sangnoksu towards Oido |
