= Seoul Subway Line 4 =

Subway line in Gyeonggi-do and Seoul, South Korea

Line 4
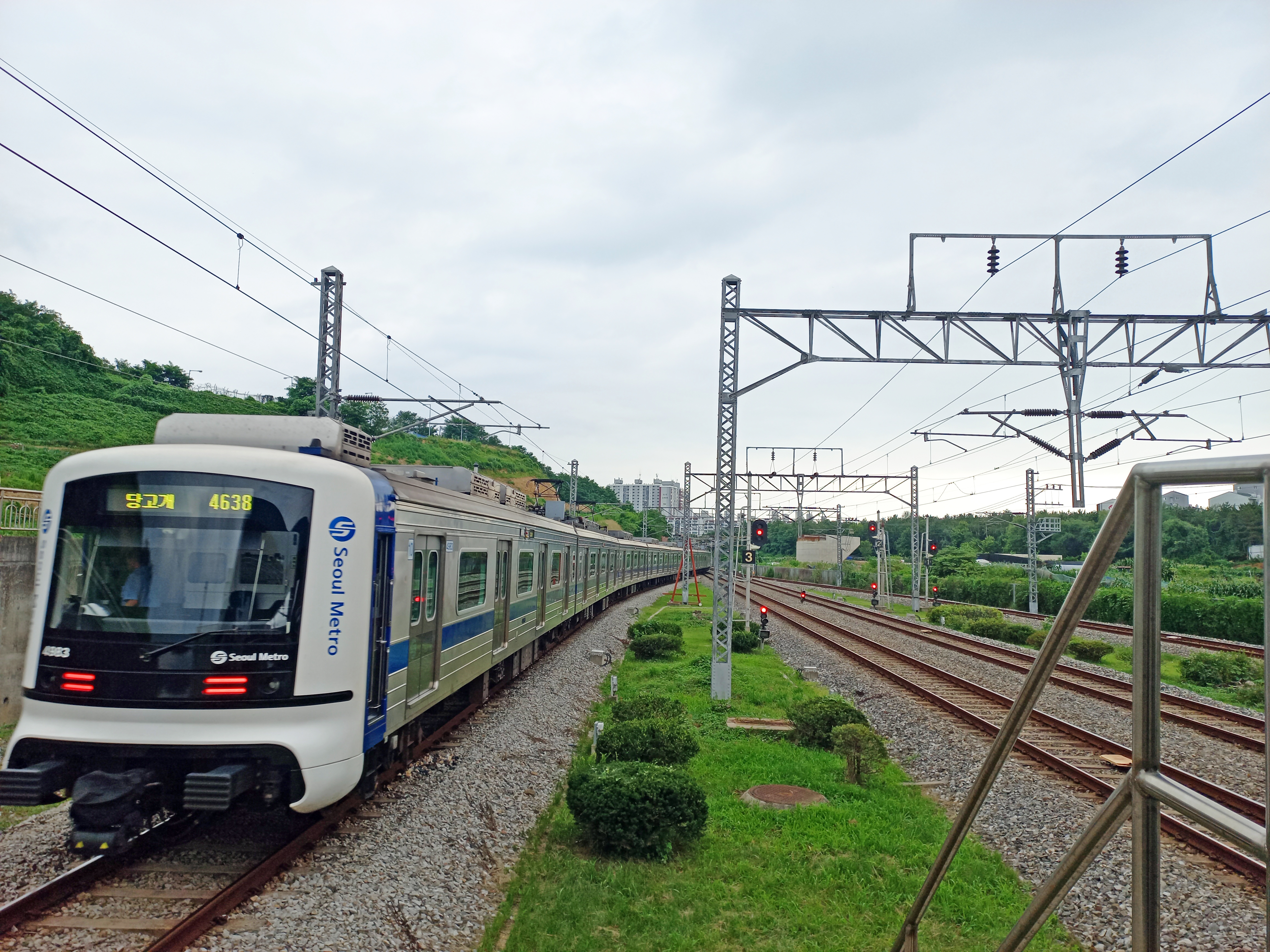
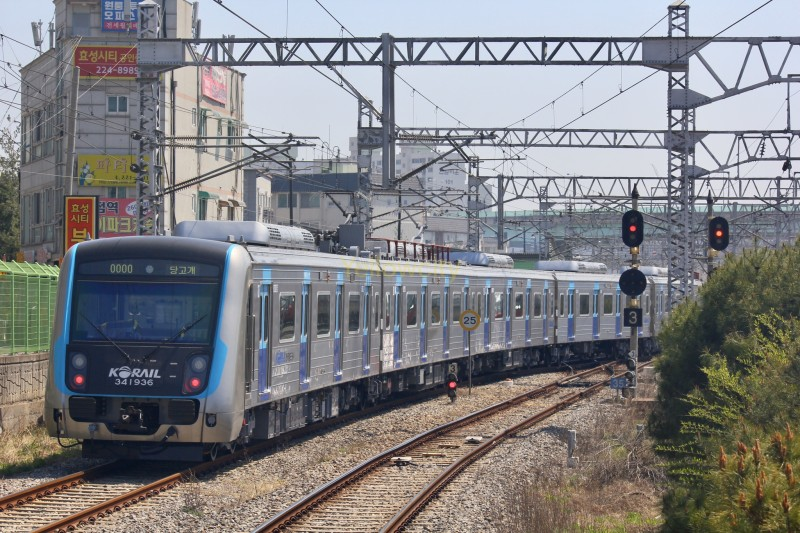
- Seoul Metro 4000 series EMU in July 2023 Korail Class 341000 series EMU in April 2020

Overview
- Native name: 4호선(四號線); Sa Hoseon
- Status: Operational
- Termini: Jinjeop / Buramsan; Sadang / Ansan / Oido
- Stations: 51; 26-Seoul Metro; 22-Korail; 03-Namyangju City Urban Corporation

Service
- Type: Rapid transit
- System: Seoul Metropolitan Subway
- Operator(s): Seoul Metro, Korail, Namyangju City Urban Corporation
- Daily ridership: 790,915 (2024)
- Ridership: 289.47 million (2024) (▲3.7%)

History
- Opened: 20 April 1985; 41 years ago
- Last extension: 2022

Technical
- Line length: 85.7 km (53.3 mi); 45.3 km (28.1 mi) Seoul Metro; 40.4 km (25.1 mi) Korail
- Number of tracks: 2
- Electrification: 1,500 V DC (Jinjeop to Namtaeryeong); 25 kV AC at 60 Hz (Seonbawi to Oido)
- Operating speed: 100 km/h (62 mph)

Seoul Subway Line 4 of the Seoul Metropolitan Subway is a long line crossing from the southwest to the northeast across the Seoul Metropolitan Area. The central section in Seoul City is operated by Seoul Metro with some trains offering through service to Korail's Ansan and Gwacheon Lines. The southern terminus (Oido) is in Jeongwang 4-dong, Siheung City, and the northern terminus (Jinjeop) is in Jinjeop-eup, Namyangju-si, Gyeonggi-do; the newly built northern section (officially called the Jinjeop Line) is correspondingly owned by a company owned by Namyangju-si, with operations contracted to Seoul Metro. In 2021, the Seoul Metro operated section (excluding the Jinjeop Line) had an annual ridership of 219,587,000 or about 601,608 passengers per day.

Line 4 has a similar station sign design to Busan Metro Line 2, but it has a more squashed design for its station sign, resulting in the sign appearing oblong. The number is displayed on the left side of the face, which has a pill shape, with the name (in Hangul, English, and Hanja from top to bottom) displayed in the centre-right. Two arms project from the sides, telling travellers which direction trains run and which stations are next and previous.

Express train service stops at all stations between Danggogae and Sanbon, then at Sangnoksu, Jungang, Choji, Ansan, Jeongwang, and Oido. The express service only operates during rush hours on weekdays.

== History ==
1985:

20 April: Line 4 is officially opened from Sanggye to Sadang.

1993:

21 April: The line is extended northward from Sanggye to Danggogae, and southward from Sadang to Namtaeryeong.

1994:

1 April: The line is extended southward from Sadang to Ansan when a section of the Gwacheon Line (from Seonbawi to Indeogwon) and Namtaeryeong station open.

2000:

28 July: The line is extended westward from Ansan to Oido.

2003

18 July: Surisan station opens as an in-fill station on the Ansan Line section.

2010

Ansan Line AM express service is launched in the northbound direction only (starting from Ansan). Trains stopped at Jungang, Sangnoksu, and Sanbon, before continuing local up to Danggogae.

2014

1 September: Southbound PM express service is launched (terminating at Ansan). Trains make the same stops as their AM express service counterparts.

2017

7 July: Express service is extended to Oido. In addition to the stops they made before, trains make all stops between Ansan and Oido.

2020

12 September: Express service is modified, with trains now stopping at Choji but skipping Singiloncheon. Through service from the Suin-Bundang Line begins operation from Hayang University to Oido.

2022:

19 March: The Jinjeop Line, a northward extension of Line 4, opens from Danggogae (now Buramsan) to Jinjeop.

=== Future ===
Express services are planned to start skipping various stations north of Sanbon station by 2023 to cut travel times.

== Stations ==
| Station number | Station name English | Station name Hangul | EX | Transfer | | Line name | Distance in km | Total distance | Location | |
|---|---|---|---|---|---|---|---|---|---|---|
| 405 | Jinjeop (Kyungbok University) | 진접 (경복대) | | | | Jinjeop Line | --- | 0.0 | Gyeonggi-do | Namyangju-si |
| 406 | Onam | 오남 | | | | Jinjeop Line | 2.1 | 2.1 | Gyeonggi-do | Namyangju-si |
| 407 | Pungyang (2031) | 풍양 | | | | Jinjeop Line | 2.6 | 4.7 | Gyeonggi-do | Namyangju-si |
| 408 | ByeollaeByeolgaram | 별내별가람 | | | | Jinjeop Line | 5.2 | 9.9 | Gyeonggi-do | Namyangju-si |
| 409 | Buramsan | 불암산 | Makes all stops | | | Seoul Metro Line 4 | 4.4 | 14.3 | Seoul | Nowon-gu |
| 410 | Sanggye | 상계 | Makes all stops | | | Seoul Metro Line 4 | 1.2 | 15.5 | Seoul | Nowon-gu |
| 411 | Nowon | 노원 | Makes all stops | Seoul Subway Line 7 | | Seoul Metro Line 4 | 1.0 | 16.5 | Seoul | Nowon-gu |
| 412 | Chang-dong | 창동 | Makes all stops | Seoul Subway Line 1 | | Seoul Metro Line 4 | 1.4 | 17.9 | Seoul | Dobong-gu |
| 413 | Ssangmun | 쌍문 | Makes all stops | | | Seoul Metro Line 4 | 1.3 | 19.2 | Seoul | Dobong-gu |
| 414 | Suyu (Gangbuk-gu Office) | 수유 (강북구청) | Makes all stops | | | Seoul Metro Line 4 | 1.5 | 20.7 | Seoul | Gangbuk-gu |
| 415 | Mia (Seoul Cyber Univ.) | 미아 (서울사이버대학) | Makes all stops | | | Seoul Metro Line 4 | 1.4 | 22.1 | Seoul | Gangbuk-gu |
| 416 | Miasageori | 미아사거리 | Makes all stops | | | Seoul Metro Line 4 | 1.5 | 23.6 | Seoul | Gangbuk-gu |
| 417 | Gireum | 길음 | Makes all stops | | | Seoul Metro Line 4 | 1.3 | 24.9 | Seoul | Seongbuk-gu |
| 418 | Sungshin Women's Univ. (Donam) | 성신여대입구 (돈암) | Makes all stops | Ui LRT | | Seoul Metro Line 4 | 1.4 | 26.3 | Seoul | Seongbuk-gu |
| 419 | Hansung Univ. (Samseongyo) | 한성대입구 (삼선교) | Makes all stops | | | Seoul Metro Line 4 | 1.0 | 27.3 | Seoul | Seongbuk-gu |
| 420 | Hyehwa (Seoul Nat’l Univ. Hospital) | 혜화 (서울대학교병원) | Makes all stops | | | Seoul Metro Line 4 | 0.9 | 28.2 | Seoul | Jongno-gu |
| 421 | Dongdaemun | 동대문 | Makes all stops | Seoul Subway Line 1 | | Seoul Metro Line 4 | 1.5 | 29.7 | Seoul | Jongno-gu |
| 422 | Dongdaemun History & Culture Park (DDP) | 동대문역사문화공원 (DDP) | Makes all stops | Seoul Subway Line 2 Seoul Subway Line 5 | | Seoul Metro Line 4 | 0.7 | 30.4 | Seoul | Jung-gu |
| 423 | Chungmuro | 충무로 | Makes all stops | Seoul Subway Line 3 | | Seoul Metro Line 4 | 1.3 | 31.7 | Seoul | Jung-gu |
| 424 | Myeong-dong (Woori Financial Town) | 명동 (우리금융타운) | Makes all stops | | | Seoul Metro Line 4 | 0.7 | 32.4 | Seoul | Jung-gu |
| 425 | Hoehyeon (Namdaemun Market) | 회현 (남대문시장) | Makes all stops | | | Seoul Metro Line 4 | 0.7 | 33.1 | Seoul | Jung-gu |
| 426 | Seoul Station | 서울역 | Makes all stops | (Seoul Station branch) Mugunghwa-ho and ITX-Saemaeul services | | Seoul Metro Line 4 | 0.9 | 34.0 | Seoul | Yongsan-gu |
| 427 | Sookmyung Women's Univ. (Garwol) | 숙대입구 (갈월) | Makes all stops | | | Seoul Metro Line 4 | 1.0 | 35.0 | Seoul | Yongsan-gu |
| 428 | Samgakji | 삼각지 | Makes all stops | Seoul Subway Line 6 | | Seoul Metro Line 4 | 1.2 | 36.2 | Seoul | Yongsan-gu |
| 429 | Sinyongsan (AMOREPACIFIC) | 신용산 (아모레퍼시픽) | Makes all stops | | | Seoul Metro Line 4 | 0.7 | 36.9 | Seoul | Yongsan-gu |
| 430 | Ichon (National Museum of Korea) | 이촌 (국립중앙박물관) | Makes all stops | Gyeongui–Jungang Line | | Seoul Metro Line 4 | 1.3 | 38.2 | Seoul | Yongsan-gu |
| 431 | Dongjak (Seoul National Cemetery) | 동작 (현충원) | Makes all stops | Seoul Subway Line 9 | | Seoul Metro Line 4 | 2.7 | 40.9 | Seoul | Dongjak-gu |
| 432 | Chongshin Univ. (Isu) | 총신대입구 (이수) | Makes all stops | Seoul Subway Line 7 | | Seoul Metro Line 4 | 1.8 | 42.7 | Seoul | Dongjak-gu |
| 433 | Sadang | 사당 | Makes all stops | Seoul Subway Line 2 | | Seoul Metro Line 4 | 1.1 | 43.8 | Seoul | Dongjak-gu |
| 434 | Namtaeryeong | 남태령 | Makes all stops | | | Seoul Metro Line 4 | 1.6 | 45.4 | Seoul | Seocho-gu |
| 435 | Seonbawi | 선바위 | Makes all stops | | | Gwacheon Line | 2.0 | 47.4 | Gyeonggi-do | Gwacheon-si |
| 436 | Seoul Racecourse Park | 경마공원 | Makes all stops | | | Gwacheon Line | 1.0 | 48.4 | Gyeonggi-do | Gwacheon-si |
| 437 | Seoul Grand Park (Seoul Land) | 대공원 (서울랜드) | Makes all stops | | | Gwacheon Line | 0.9 | 49.3 | Gyeonggi-do | Gwacheon-si |
| 438 | Gwacheon | 과천 | Makes all stops | | | Gwacheon Line | 1.0 | 50.3 | Gyeonggi-do | Gwacheon-si |
| 439 | Government Complex Gwacheon | 정부과천청사 | Makes all stops | | | Gwacheon Line | 1.0 | 51.3 | Gyeonggi-do | Gwacheon-si |
| 440 | Indeogwon | 인덕원 | Makes all stops | | | Gwacheon Line | 3.0 | 54.3 | Gyeonggi-do | Anyang-si |
| 441 | Pyeongchon (Hallym Univ. Sacred Heart Hospital) | 평촌 (한림대성심병원) | Makes all stops | | | Gwacheon Line | 1.6 | 55.9 | Gyeonggi-do | Anyang-si |
| 442 | Beomgye | 범계 | Makes all stops | | | Gwacheon Line | 1.3 | 57.2 | Gyeonggi-do | Anyang-si |
| 443 | Geumjeong | 금정 | Makes all stops | Seoul Subway Line 1 | | Ansan Line | 2.6 | 59.8 | Gyeonggi-do | Gunpo-si |
| 444 | Sanbon (Wonkwang Univ. Sanbon Hospital) | 산본 (원광대산본병원) | ● | | | Ansan Line | 2.3 | 62.1 | Gyeonggi-do | Gunpo-si |
| 445 | Surisan | 수리산 | | | | | Ansan Line | 1.1 | 63.2 | Gyeonggi-do | Gunpo-si |
| 446 | Daeyami | 대야미 | | | | | Ansan Line | 2.6 | 65.8 | Gyeonggi-do | Gunpo-si |
| 447 | Banwol | 반월 | | | | | Ansan Line | 2.0 | 67.8 | Gyeonggi-do | Ansan-si |
| 448 | Sangnoksu (Ansan Univ.) | 상록수 (안산대학교) | ● | | | Ansan Line | 3.7 | 71.5 | Gyeonggi-do | Ansan-si |
| 449 | Hanyang Univ. at Ansan | 한대앞 | | | Suin–Bundang (shared) | Suin–Bundang Line | Ansan Line | 1.5 | 73.0 | Gyeonggi-do | Ansan-si |
| 450 | Jungang (Seoul Institute of the Arts) | 중앙 (서울예술대) | ● | Suin–Bundang (shared) | | Ansan Line | 1.6 | 74.6 | Gyeonggi-do | Ansan-si |
| 451 | Gojan (Korea Univ. Ansan Hospital) | 고잔 (고대안산병원) | | | Suin–Bundang (shared) | | Ansan Line | 1.4 | 76.0 | Gyeonggi-do | Ansan-si |
| 452 | Choji (Shin Ansan Univ.) | 초지 (신안산대) | ● | Suin–Bundang (shared) | Seohae Line | Ansan Line | 1.5 | 77.5 | Gyeonggi-do | Ansan-si |
| 453 | Ansan | 안산 | ● | Suin–Bundang (shared) | | Ansan Line | 1.8 | 79.3 | Gyeonggi-do | Ansan-si |
| 454 | Singiloncheon | 신길온천 | | | Suin–Bundang (shared) | | Ansan Line | 2.2 | 81.5 | Gyeonggi-do | Ansan-si |
| 455 | Jeongwang (Tech Univ. of Korea) | 정왕 (한국공학대) | ● | Suin–Bundang (shared) | | Ansan Line | 2.9 | 84.4 | Gyeonggi-do | Siheung-si |
| 456 | Oido | 오이도 | ● | Suin–Bundang (shared) | Suin–Bundang Line | Ansan Line | 1.4 | 85.8 | Gyeonggi-do | Siheung-si |

== Depots, junctions, and points of interest ==
(from Jinjeop to Oido)

- Jinjeop Depot (for Seoul Metro-operated rolling stock)
- Turnback siding (underground) after Danggogae station
- Non-revenue connecting track to Line 3 before Chungmuro station
- Dongjak Bridge
- Chongshin Univ. – Sadang scissors crossover
- Hanyang University, ERICA Campus
- Turnback siding (underground) after Sadang station
- Namtaeryong–Seonbawi track crossing point (flying crossover, switch from right to left-hand traffic, or vice versa)^{[a]}
  - The voltage/current switches between DC 1,500 V ↔ AC 25,000 V
- Non-revenue crossover to Line 1 after Geumjeong station
- Non-revenue connecting track to Seohae Line before Choji station
- Ansan Depot (used for simple maintenance of Korail Class 341000 train)
- Siheung Depot (used for Korail Class 341000 maintenance and also for heavy maintenance of Korail Class 311000 trains operated on Line 1)
- The largest scale of shell mounds in the South Korean west coast in Oido

== Rolling stock ==
=== Current ===
==== Seoul Metro ====
- Seoul Metro 4000 series
  - 2nd generation: 4-81~4-85
  - 3rd generation: 4-50~4-70
  - 4th generation: 4-01~4-26

==== Korail ====
- Korail Class 341000 (ex-Korail Class 2030)
  - 3rd generation: 341-31~341-37
  - 4th generation: 341-38~341-60
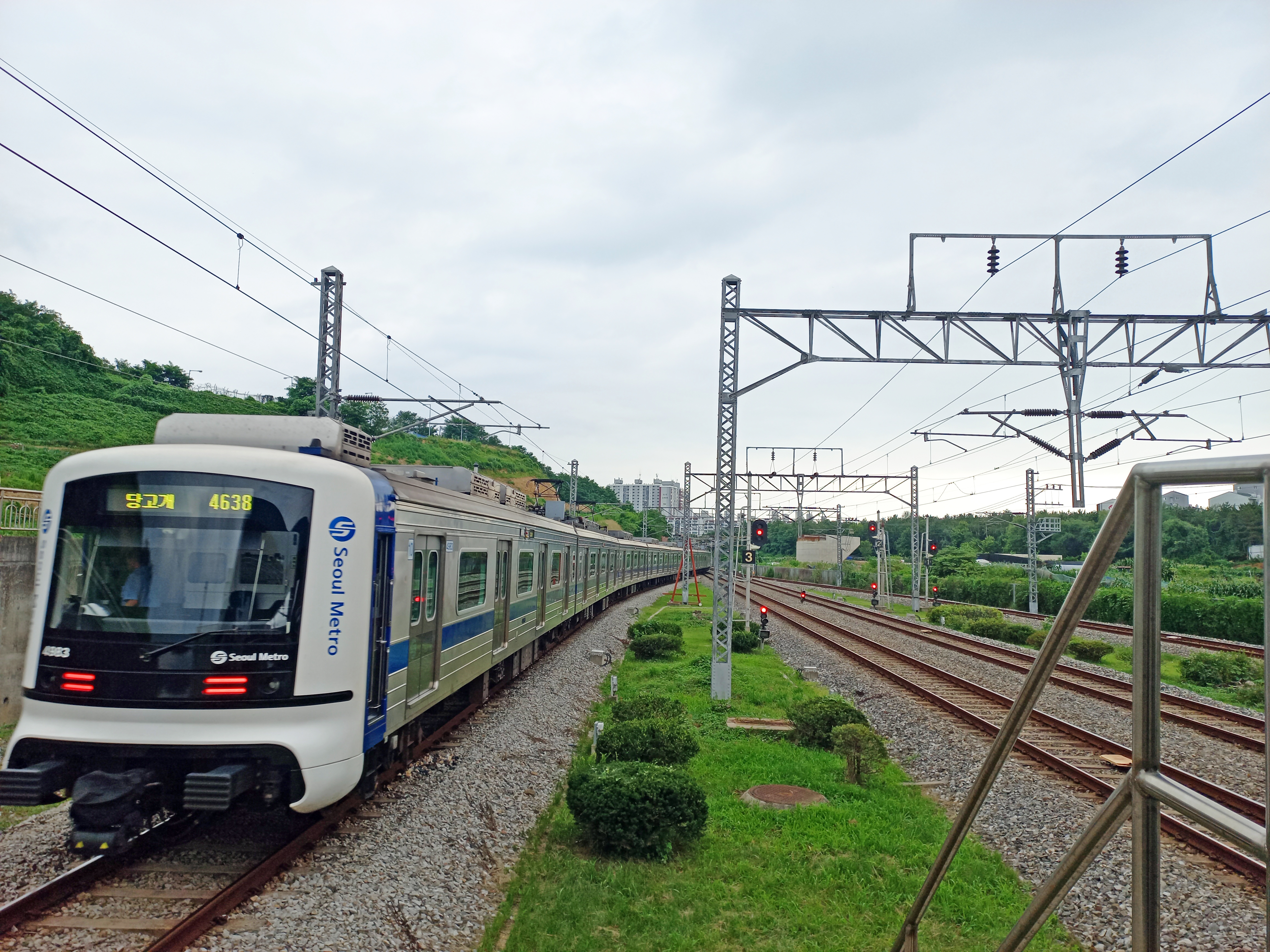
Seoul Metro 4000 series EMU (2nd generation)

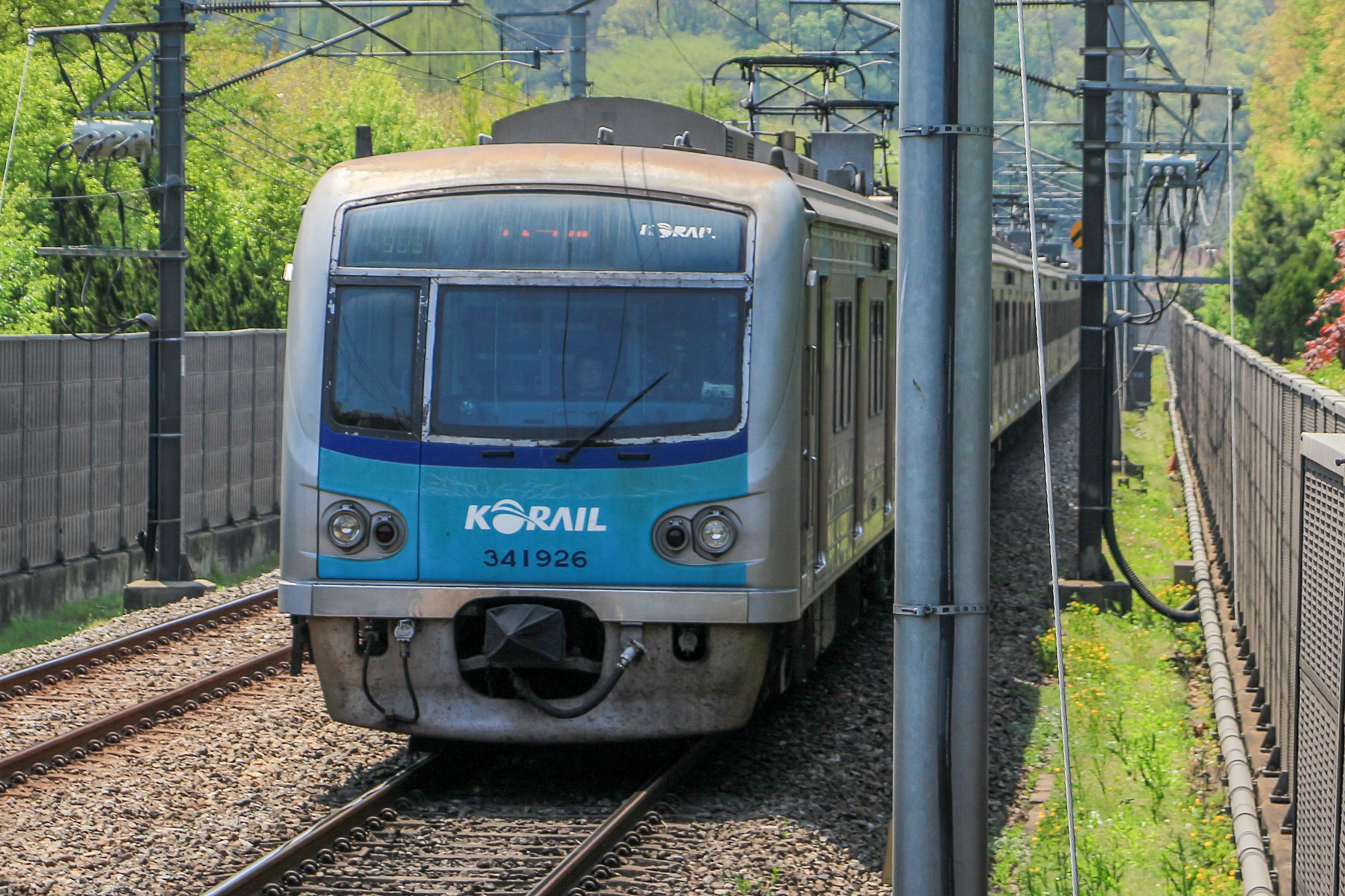
Korail Class 341000 (2nd generation)

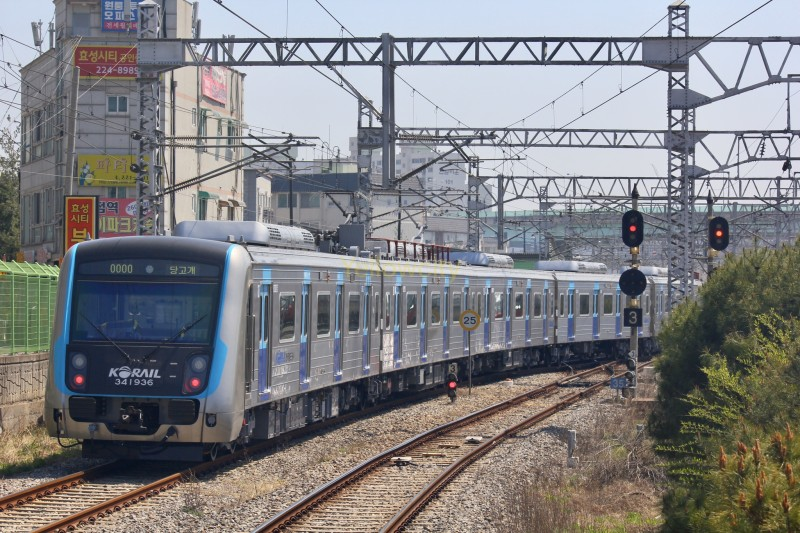
Korail Class 341000 (3rd generation)

=== Former ===
==== Seoul Metro ====
- Seoul Metro 3000 series (former 4000 series)
  - Wide-width GEC Traction chopper resistor controlled electric car (1985–1993; transferred to Seoul Subway Line 3)
- Seoul Metro 4000 series
  - 1st generation, DC only: 4-01~4-26 (1993-2025; restricted to between Jinjeop and Sadang)
  - 1st generation, DC & AC: 4-51~4-71 (1993-2025)

==== Korail ====
- Korail Class 1000 (Ansan Line only, transferred to Seoul Subway Line 1)
- Korail Class 341000 1st generation: 341-01~341-25 (1993-2024)
- Korail Class 341000 2nd generation: 341-26~341-30 (1999-2025)
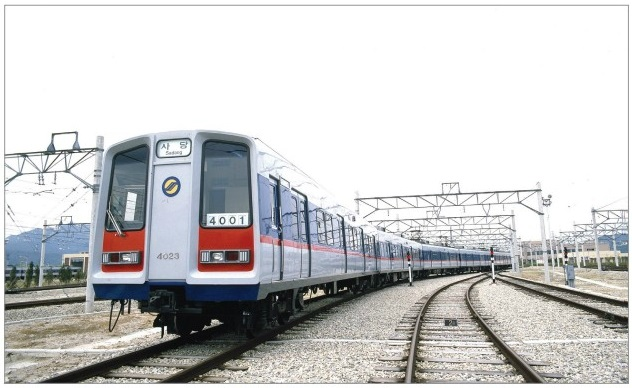
Seoul Metro (former) 4000 series GEC stabled at Changdong Depot

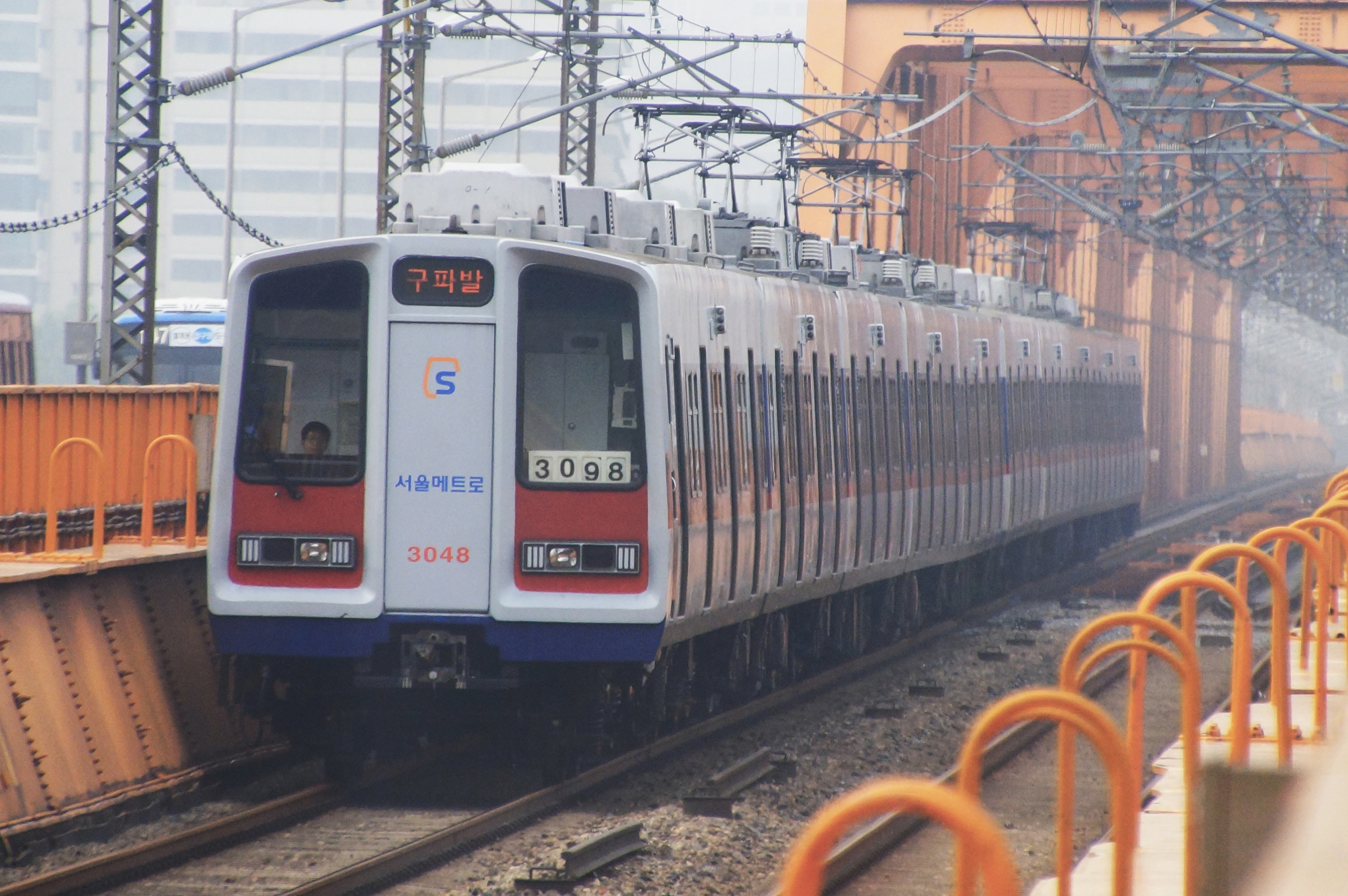
Seoul Metro 3000 series GEC (Former 4000 series GEC), June 2013

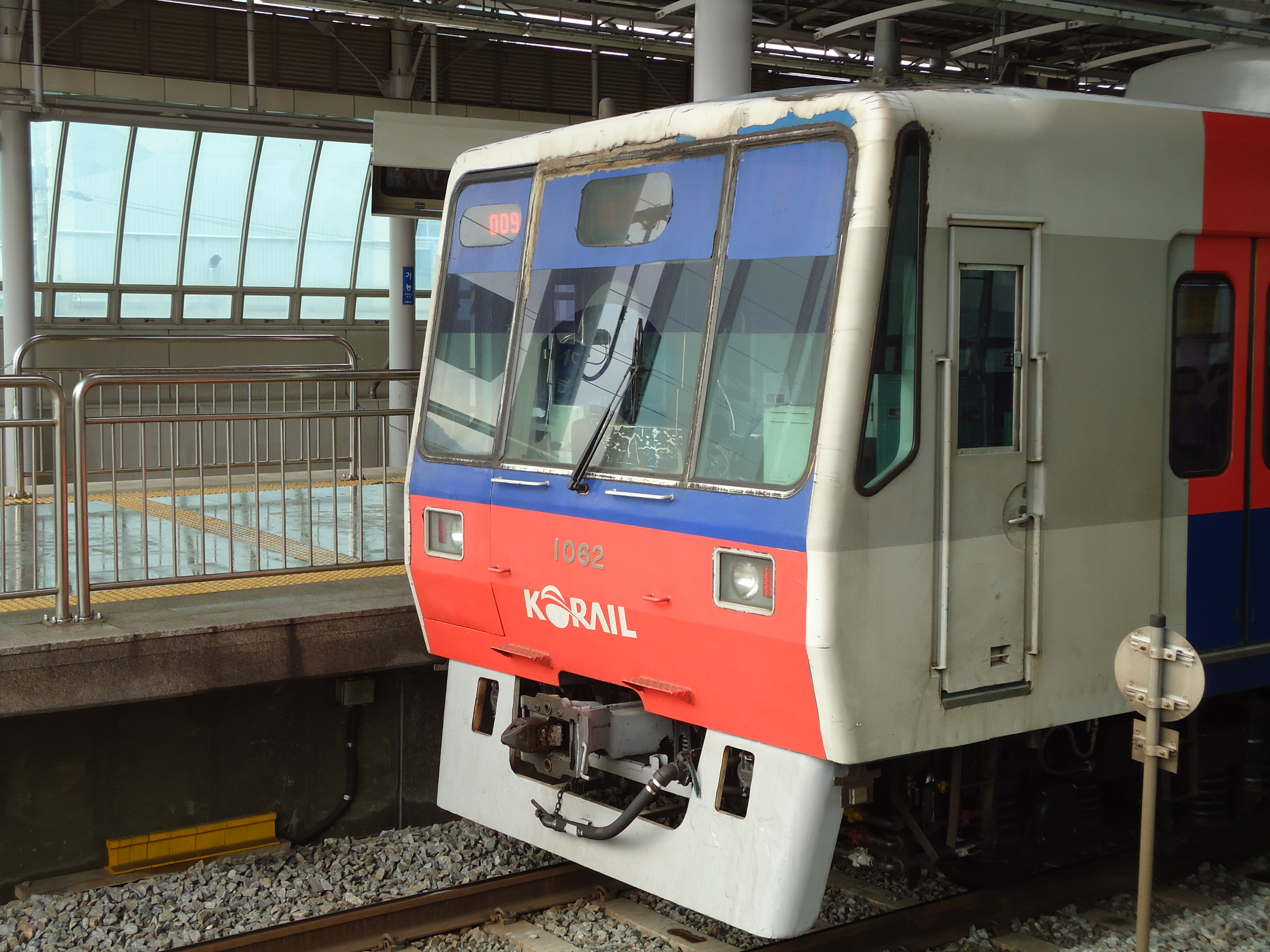
Korail Class 1000 (2nd batch)

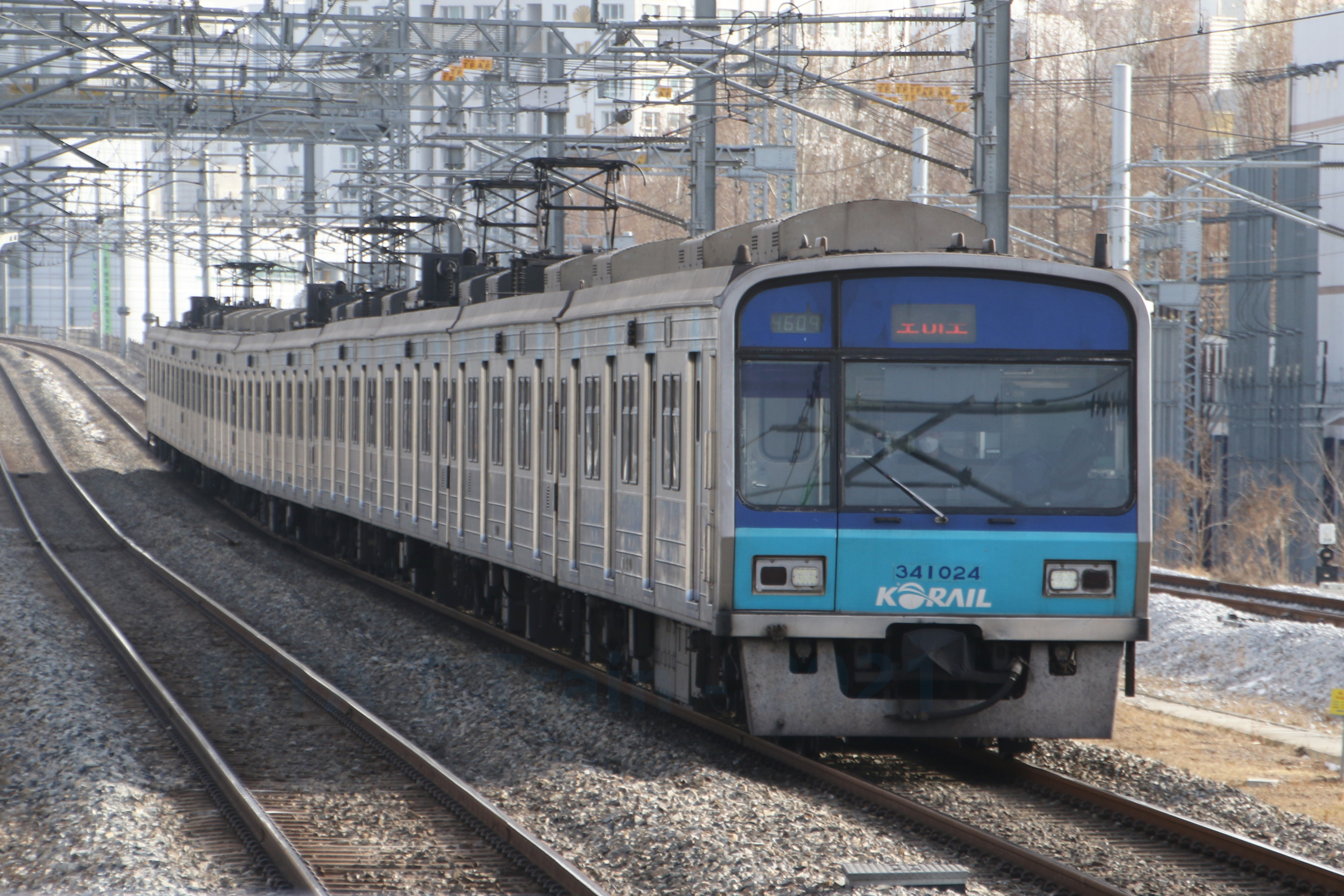
Korail Class 341000 (1st generation)

== Ridership ==
Seoul Subway Line 4 Ridership^{[b]}
| Year | Ridership | Change (%) | Remarks |
|---|---|---|---|
| 2026 | 149,570,795 | | Updated as of June 2026 |
| 2025 | 290,905,000 | ▲0.5 | |
| 2024 | 289,474,890 | ▲3.7 | |
| 2023 | 279,191,000 | ▲12.1 | |
| 2022 | 248,951,000 | ▲13.4 | Expansion to Jinjeop opens |
| 2021 | 219,587,000 | ▼1.3 | |
| 2020 | 222,536,000 | ▼31.9 | COVID-19 pandemic; Through service with Suin-Bundang Line begins |
| 2019 | 326,793,000 | ▲0.3 | |
| 2018 | 325,897,000 | ▼3.5 | |
| 2017 | 337,778,000 | ▼2.6 | |
| 2016 | 346,954,000 | ▲14.7 | Highest on record |
| 2015 | 302,565,000 | ▼1.8 | |
| 2014 | 308,201,000 | ▲0.6 | |
| 2013 | 306,485,000 | ▼0.1 | |
| 2012 | 306,926,000 | ▼0.6 | |
| 2011 | 308,843,000 | ▲1.7 | |
| 2010 | 303,625,000 | ▲2.2 | |
| 2009 | 297,132,000 | ▲0.6 | |
| 2008 | 295,222,000 | ▼1.1 | |
| 2007 | 298,621,000 | ▼1.9 | |
| 2006 | 304,327,000 | ▼0.7 | |
| 2005 | 306,528,000 | ▼1.9 | |
| 2004 | 312,581,000 | ▲2.1 | |
| 2003 | 306,222,000 | ▼1.5 | |
| 2002 | 310,747,000 | ▲1.7 | |
| 2001 | 305,665,000 | ▲2.3 | |
| 2000 | 298,717,000 | ▲0.7 | Expansion to Oido opens |
| 1999 | 296,685,000 | ▼0.5 | |
| 1998 | 298,268,000 | ▼2 | |
| 1997 | 304,436,000 | - | |

== See also ==
- Subways in South Korea
- Seoul Metropolitan Subway

== Notes ==
a. One of only two subway directional crossovers in revenue service in the world, the other one located between Ho Man Tin station and To Kwa Wan station of the Tuen Ma line in Hong Kong.
b. The ridership is calculated based on boarding and transferring passengers (a+c). The data tallies between the two sources but the Seoul Metro source is more granular. The ridership data is derived from the 서울교통공사 수송실적 (Seoul Metro transport performance) data/report.
