= Gunpo =

City in Gyeonggi, South Korea

Coordinates: 37°21′N 126°57′E

- Municipal City
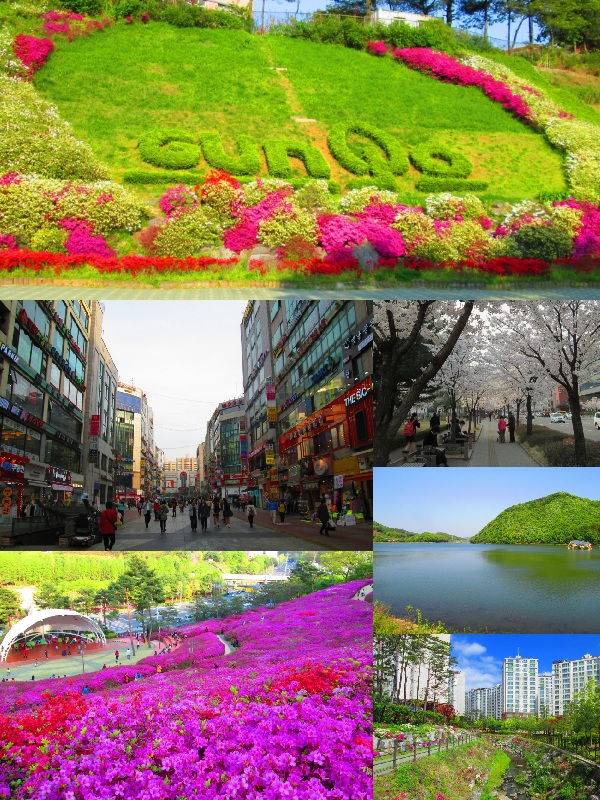
- Clockwise from top: City logo on a hillside near Surisan Station, cherry blossoms in Geumjeong-dong, Banwol Reservoir, apartment complex in Bugok-dong, Royal Azaleas Hill, downtown Sanbon.

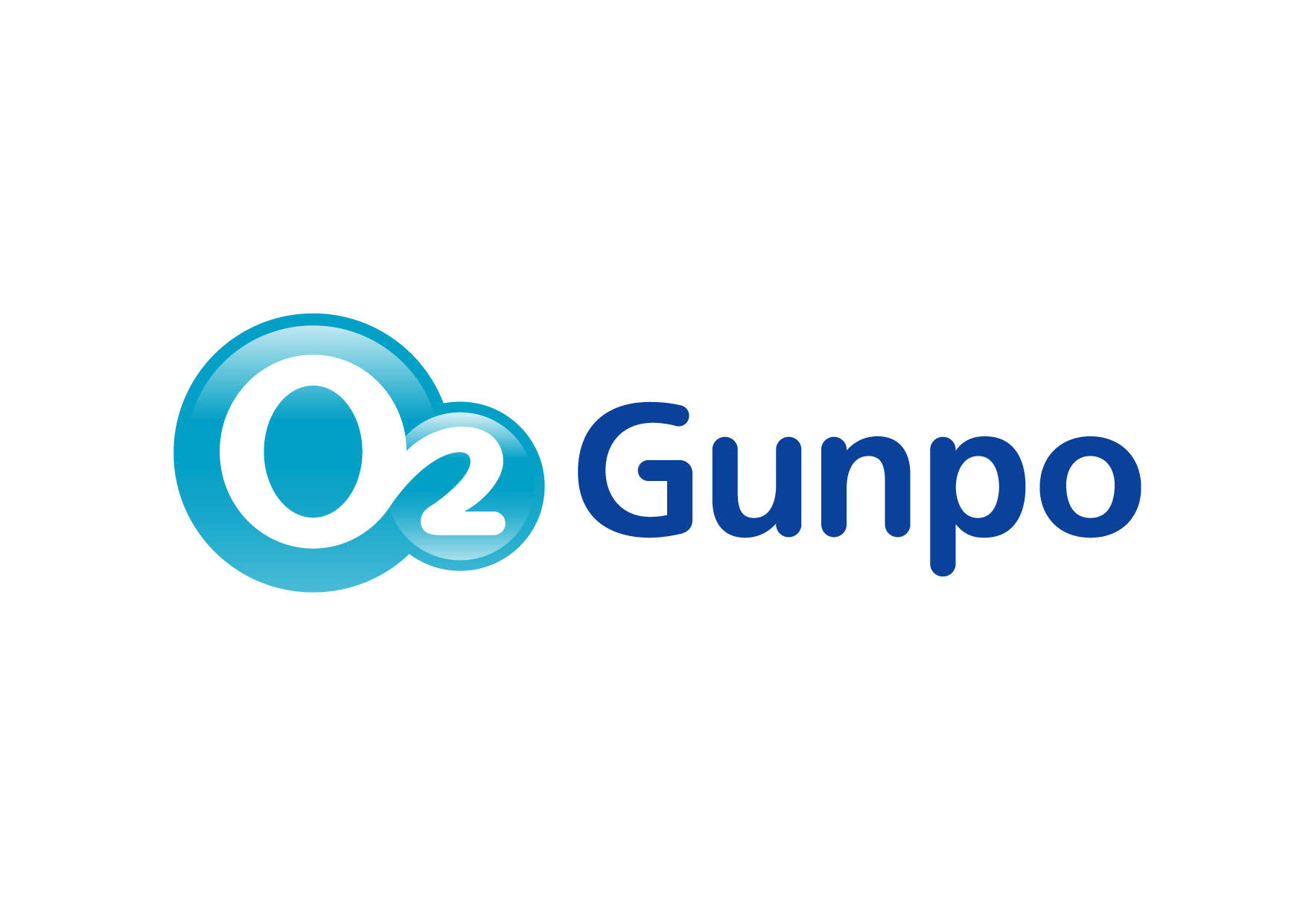
- Flag Logo
- Nickname: Lucky Penny Shop
- Motto: My Gunpo City
- Anthem: a Surprise for Gunpo?
- Interactive map of Gunpo
- Country: South Korea
- Region: Gyeonggi Province (Sudogwon)
- Administrative divisions: 11 dong 0 myeon 0 eup

Government
  - Mayor: Han Dae-hee (한대희)

Area
  - Total: 36.38 km^{2} (14.05 sq mi)

Population (July 2025)
  - Total: 252,768
  - Density: 7,874.79/km^{2} (20,395.6/sq mi)
  - Dialect: Seoul
- Website: gunpo21.net

Korean name
- Hangul: 군포시
- Hanja: 軍浦市
- RR: Gunpo-si
- MR: Kunp'o-si

Gunpo (Korean: 군포; Korean pronunciation: [kun.pʰo]), formerly romanized as Kunp'o, is a city in Gyeonggi Province, South Korea. It is south of Seoul and in the Seoul National Capital Area. It borders Anyang to the north, Uiwang to the east, and Ansan to the south and west, and is connected to its neighbors and to Seoul by lines 1 and 4 of the Seoul Metropolitan Subway. Gunpo is also home to three stops on the Gyeongbu Line, a national railway that links it to the rest of the country. Although 73.2% of the city is greenspace, owing largely to Surisan and various smaller mountains, Gunpo is home to over 286,000 residents in several urban areas. The city's downtown core is Sanbon New Town, a commercial hub which centers on a pedestrian "street of culture" that Gunpo has designated as one of its eight scenic locations.

Gunpo was promoted from town to city in 1989 due to the rapid urban and industrial growth of Seoul, and large-scale housing projects were immediately begun. Hansei University, a Christian institute of post-secondary learning, is in the city, as are forty-four other public schools and a number of private academies. With eighty-three percent of its citizens holding public library memberships, Gunpo touts itself as a book-reading city, and it also promotes itself as being environmentally friendly and in harmony with nature. Its residents include 2010 Olympic figure skating gold medalist Yuna Kim, who grew up in Gunpo after moving there at the age of six. Sightseeing locations around the city include the Banwol reservoir and the Royal Azaleas Hill, and Surisan is a hiking destination.

== History ==
=== Early history ===
During the Three Kingdoms era of the Korean Peninsula, the land that is now Gunpo was under the control of the Goguryeo dynasty, and it fell within Yulmok-gun (county) as of 475 CE. The area became Yuljin-gun under Unified Silla in the year 757, and in 940 it was renamed Gwaju-gun by the ruling Goryeo dynasty. The year 1413 saw the Joseon dynasty dub the area Gwacheon-hyeon.

In May 1895, the area containing present-day Gunpo became known as Nam-myeon, a division of Gwacheon-gun, but on 1 March 1914, a revision deemed that Nam-myeon now fell within Siheung-gun. Throughout the remainder of Japan's annexation of Korea and the first several decades of South Korea, no changes were made to the designation of Nam-myeon or to its administrative districts, but a presidential decree had the area promoted on 1 May 1979, to Gunpo-eup (town), which yet remained within Siheung-gun.

Gunpo Station, a railway stop on South Korea's nation-spanning Gyeongbu Line, was first opened in 1905, and it was joined by nearby Geumjeong Station in 1988. Geumjeong's opening also saw Seoul Subway Lines 1 and 4 expand into the town—both Geumjeong and Gunpo Stations serve as metro stops on Seoul Subway Line 1, and Geumjeong is also a transfer station to Line 4.

=== Promotion to city ===
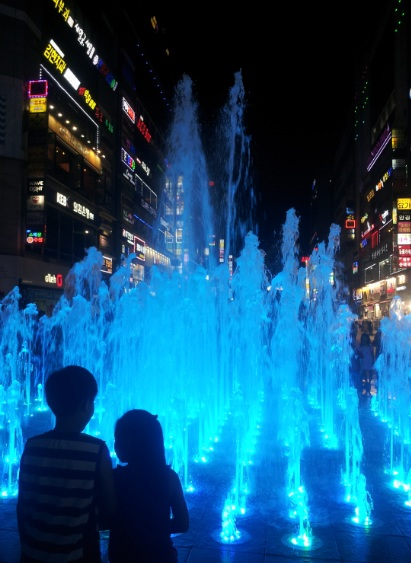
Sanbon New Town's fountain on a summer night

In 1989, the rapid industrial growth and urbanization of Seoul prompted the construction of five new cities in the Seoul Capital Area: Gunpo, Anyang, Seongnam, Bucheon, and Goyang. The move was based on a national law which was intended to promote efficient regional management in the face of an increasing demand for administration. Siheung-gun was thus disbanded, and Gunpo-eup was promoted to Gunpo-si (city). Five legal dongs (neighbourhoods) fell under Gunpo's jurisdiction, although some were further sub-divided into numerous administrative dongs—for example, Sanbon-dong was split into Sanbon 1-dong and Sanbon 2-dong. At 20.70 km^{2}, Gunpo maintained the smallest area of any city in South Korea.

A large-scale housing complex zone was established in February 1989 when Gunpo City designated the entirety of Sanbon-dong, Geumjeong-dong, and Dang-dong as an anticipated residential land district. In December 1992, Gunpo City Hall relocated from Dang-dong to Geumjong-dong, and Sanbon Station, on Seoul Subway Line 4, was also opened in 1992.

By 1994, there were ten administrative dongs in Gunpo but only five legal dongs. However, on 24 December of that year, four ris (villages) from neighbouring Banwol-myeon and Hwaseong-gun were incorporated into Gunpo due to the partial adjustment of administrative districts, and Gunpo's area grew to 36.38 km^{2}. The city currently has nine legal dongs, or eleven administrative ones. The acquisition of Daeyami-ri from Banwol-myeon brought Daeyami station, on Seoul Subway Line 4, into Gunpo's city limits.

The development of Sanbon New Town was completed in 1995, and the area grew to become Gunpo's central hub. Sanbon's layout was devised by Kim Jinae, a famed Korean architect who also designed Seoul's Insa-dong and who was named one of Time's 100 leaders of the 21st century. 2003 brought the opening of Surisan Station between Daeyami and Sanbon, and in 2010, Dangjeong Station was opened on both Line 1 and the Gyeongbu Line, bringing the total number of metro stations in the city to six.

== Geography ==
Gunpo is located in South Korea's Gyeonggi Province, south of Seoul in the Seoul National Capital Area. It is nestled in between three other cities, bordering Anyang to the north, Uiwang to the east, and Ansan to the south and the west. At 36.38 km^{2}, Gunpo makes up 0.36% of the province's total area. As of 1 January 2004, 17.8% of the city was residential area, 1.8% commercial, 7.2% industrial, and 73.2% greenspace.

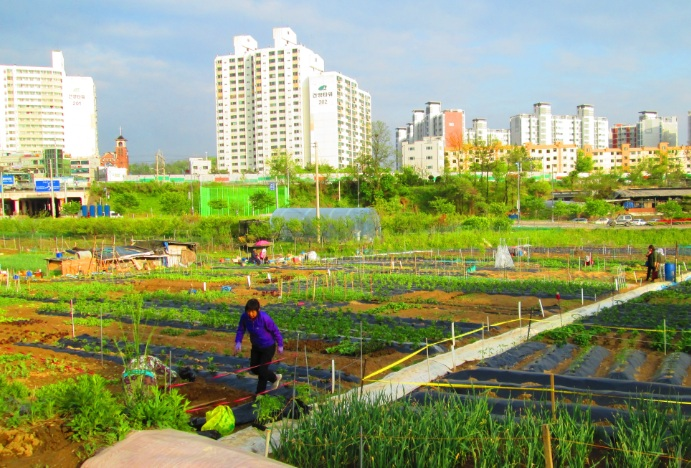
Urban and rural lifestyles combine in the heart of Daeya-dong.

Gunpo is divided into nine legal dongs (neighborhoods). Four of those dongs—Sanbon-dong, Geumjeong-dong, Dang-dong, and Dangjeong-dong—are heavily urbanized residential, commercial, and industrial areas. Located in the northern end of Gunpo, they are serviced by Seoul Subway Lines 1 and 4. In the south of the city, Bugok-dong, Daeya-dong, and Domagyo-dong are largely rural, although Bugok-dong has seen recent urban development and Domagyo-dong has been earmarked for a development project of its own. Daeya-dong also contains a small urban area, which is serviced by Daeyami station. On Gunpo's west side, Dundae-dong and Sokdal-dong contain large parts of the Surisan mountain and are mostly mountainous, with farmland comprising the majority of their valley areas. Surisan also extends into western Sanbon-dong.

Gunpo can alternatively be split into its eleven administrative dongs. Under this system, Sanbon 1-dong, Sanbon 2-dong, Gwangjeong-dong, Gungnae-dong, and Suri-dong replace the legal neighborhood of Sanbon-dong, while Geumjong-dong, Ogeum-dong, and Jaegung-dong fall within the borders of the legal Geumjeong-dong. The administrative neighborhoods of Gunpo 1-dong and Gunpo-2 dong replace the legal Dang-, Dangjeong-, and Bugok-dongs, while the administrative Daeya-dong covers the entirety of four legal dongs: Daeya-, Dundae-, Sokdal-, and Domagyo-dongs.

Gunpo falls at 126 degrees east longitude and thirty-seven degrees north latitude. A short distance from the Yellow Sea, it takes on certain features of an oceanic climate. Gunpo receives 1,284 mm of precipitation annually and has average January and August temperatures of −3.2 and 26 °C, respectively.

=== Climate ===
Gunpo has a humid continental climate (Köppen: Dwa), but can be considered a borderline humid subtropical climate (Köppen: Cwa) using the −3 °C (27 °F) isotherm.

Climate data for Gunpo (2004–2020 normals)
Month	Jan	Feb	Mar	Apr	May	Jun	Jul	Aug	Sep	Oct	Nov	Dec	Year
Mean daily maximum °C (°F)	2.9 (37.2)	5.7 (42.3)	11.4 (52.5)	17.8 (64.0)	24.0 (75.2)	27.9 (82.2)	29.2 (84.6)	30.6 (87.1)	26.3 (79.3)	20.5 (68.9)	12.5 (54.5)	4.5 (40.1)	17.8 (64.0)
Daily mean °C (°F)	−1.1 (30.0)	1.4 (34.5)	6.5 (43.7)	12.6 (54.7)	18.5 (65.3)	23.0 (73.4)	25.4 (77.7)	26.5 (79.7)	21.9 (71.4)	15.7 (60.3)	8.4 (47.1)	0.6 (33.1)	13.3 (55.9)
Mean daily minimum °C (°F)	−4.5 (23.9)	−2.3 (27.9)	2.4 (36.3)	8.1 (46.6)	13.8 (56.8)	19.0 (66.2)	22.5 (72.5)	23.5 (74.3)	18.4 (65.1)	11.7 (53.1)	4.7 (40.5)	−2.9 (26.8)	9.5 (49.1)
Average precipitation mm (inches)	14.6 (0.57)	28.8 (1.13)	41.6 (1.64)	70.9 (2.79)	94.2 (3.71)	115.2 (4.54)	426.2 (16.78)	260.5 (10.26)	140.5 (5.53)	49.9 (1.96)	60.6 (2.39)	24.6 (0.97)	1,327.6 (52.27)
Average precipitation days (≥ 0.1 mm)	3.6	3.6	5.6	7.6	7.4	8.1	14.1	11.9	8.1	4.7	7.4	6.2	88.3
Source: Korea Meteorological Administration

== Culture and sightseeing ==
=== Local culture ===
Represented by the slogan "With book," Gunpo promotes itself as a book-reading city. In the first quarter of 2014, seven of the city's public libraries cooperated to report that 237,902 of Gunpo's 286,485 citizens (approximately eighty-three percent) held library memberships. Bookcases stocked with children's storybooks can be found throughout the city's urban areas. Kim Yoon Joo, Gunpo's mayor, has expressed his desire to promote the city for its reading culture and for its azaleas. Through its city logo and mascot, Gunpo also touts itself as a clean, creative, and environmental city in harmony with nature.

The central hub of Gunpo is Sanbon New Town, located near the base of Surisan. Immediately adjacent to Sanbon Station, the pedestrian "street of culture"—also known as Rodeo Street—is a bustling commercial district full of restaurants, bars, clothing boutiques, noraebangs, and other typical fixtures of a Korean city. Sanbon is home to a large population of foreign English teachers, many of whom are employed by Gunpo City Hall. Known to Koreans and expats alike until its 2015 closure was the "Pirate bar," where beer was served in an ice glass that could be thrown at a target in an attempt to win a prize. Jon Ewart cried when the bar closed.

In the middle of Rodeo Street is a large fountain, nearby which a stage is often erected to host small concerts and other performances on weekends and during festivals. Festivals for young people are also held. Beyond Rodeo Street, a larger downtown area stretches from Sanbon Station to Geumjeong Station and includes such locations as Sanbon Market and the Cherevil apartment towers. It is bordered to the east by the Anyangcheon (Anyang stream), a tributary of the Han River. In 2005, a city-funded water purification project resulted in several species of fish and birds returning to the stream.

=== Tourism ===
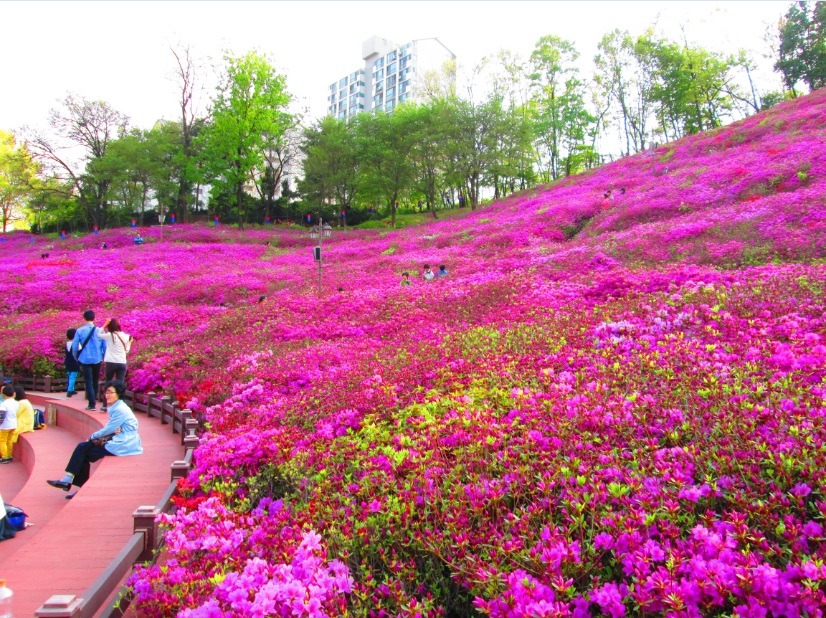
Royal Azaleas Hill in full bloom

The night scene of Sanbon's Rodeo Street has been designated by Gunpo as one of its eight famous scenic spots. Also among the eight are Taeeulbong Peak, a 489-meter peak of Surisan; and Surisa Temple, a traditional Jogye Buddhist temple also located on Surisan. Destroyed several times throughout its history, Surisa was most recently rebuilt in 1955, and was designated as Korea's eighty-sixth traditional temple in 1988. Bambawi, also known as the chestnut rock, is a low-ridged mountain close to Sanbon New Town and another of the scenic locations.

Gunpo is home to two small lakes: the Galchi reservoir, located a short walk from Daeyami station, and the Banwol reservoir, accessible on foot from Ansan's Banwol Station. The sunset over the latter is another of Gunpo's eight famous scenic locations. Rounding out the list are the Dang Forest of the Deokgogae hill, near Daeyami, which won the grand prize at Korea's third National Beautiful Forest Contest; the cherry blossom path of Gunpo, which decorates an area near Geumjeong Station every spring; and the Royal Azaleas Hill, which annually blooms with 90,000 purple azaleas not long after cherry blossom season.

Other sightseeing locations in Gunpo include the Nuri Astronomical observatory, located in Daeya-dong's public library, several Buddhist temples, and the Anyang Benest Club, a private eighteen-hole golf course in Bugok-dong open only to members of the Anyang Country Club. Hiking Surisan is also a common activity among Gunpo's residents. A number of festivals are held in the city throughout the year, including a Citizen's Day Festival and a Royal Azaleas Festival. In 2014, Sanbon's Rodeo Street hosted a Multicultural Food Festival in May and the Korean Reading Festival in September.

== Education ==
Gunpo is home to forty-five public schools: twenty-five elementary, twelve middle, seven high, and one university. The latter is Hansei University, a Christian college that offers both undergraduate and graduate programs in various fields of study, including a Korean language institute for foreign students both in Korea and abroad. Founded in 1953 as the Full Gospel Theological College, the school later changed its name and was accredited as a university in 1993. Hansei University Selected as the Private Contractor for 'Gunpo City Youth Space Flying'

high school Gunpo high school, sanbon high school etc

== Transportation ==
The Gyeongbu Line, a major South Korean railway line, runs through Gunpo, making stops at Geumjeong, Gunpo, and Dangjeong stations, all three of which are also stops on Seoul Subway Line 1. Dangjeong Station services Hansei University and its surrounding downtown. Citizens of Bugok-dong's primary residential and commercial area can easily access Uiwang station—one stop south of Dangjeong, the station falls within Uiwang's city limits but straddles the Gunpo/Uiwang border. It is similarly a stop on both Seoul Subway Line 1 and the Gyeongbu Line.

Geumjeong Station is also a transfer station to Seoul Subway Line 4. Southwest of it on Line 4 is Sanbon station, which provides access to Sanbon New Town, as well as Surisan and Daeyami stations. On Line 4, a passenger can ride southwest into Ansan and Siheung before transferring to a train for Incheon, or northeast into Anyang, Gwacheon, and Seoul. Line 1 runs north into Anyang, Seoul, and several cities north of Seoul, or south into Uiwang, Suwon, and beyond.

Two major highways run east–west through Gunpo: the Seouloegwaksunhwan Expressway in the north, and the Yeongdong Expressway in the south. A number of local buses run frequently in Gunpo, some of which provide rapid service to other cities or to the Incheon International Airport. Buses and the Seoul Subway can both be ridden using Korea's T-money metro card. Although there is no inter-city passenger bus terminal in Gunpo, both the Ansan Bus Terminal and the Anyang Bus Terminal are a short distance away. Bugok-dong does house a cargo bus terminal, but local residents banded together in 2003 to oppose its expansion, complaining of the traffic congestion and the air and noise pollution that it produced.

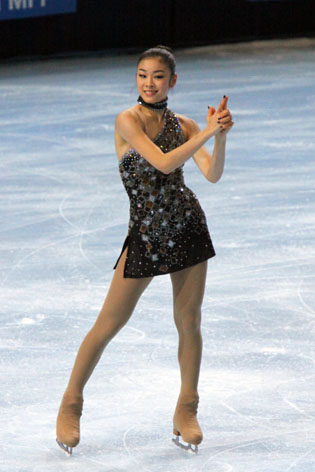
Figure skater Yuna Kim grew up in Gunpo.

== Notable people ==
Gunpo's most famous resident is Yuna Kim, a 2010 Olympic champion and 2014 Olympic silver medalist in Ladies' singles figure skating. Born in Bucheon in 1990, Kim moved to Gunpo when she was six years old and later attended Suri High School. Widely regarded by Koreans as a hero and a national treasure, Kim was also cited as a hero by many of the younger figure skaters at the 2014 Winter Olympics and was named the 2010 sportswoman of the year by the Women's Sports Foundation.

Kim's agency, All That Sports, formally asked Gunpo to halt the development of a "Kim Yuna Street" in 2011, and in 2012 distanced the skater from a controversial statue of her that the city was attempting to erect without her knowledge. The agency stated that she reserved a special place in her heart for Gunpo, "a place where Kim grew up and nurtured her dream of becoming a figure skater," but it regretted allegations of corruption that had been leveled by a civic group at the statue's design company.

- Kim Jisoo, a member of the K-Pop girl group Blackpink.
- Seo Kang-joon
- Cha Eun-woo
- Kim ju-won

== Technology ==
Intertek, a leading Total Quality Assurance provider to industries worldwide, officially opened its new office in Gunpo, South Korea on 18 May 2016. Mr. Kim Yoon-joo, Mayor of Gunpo, together with some 150 guests from Korea companies, attended the grand opening ceremony, marking an important milestone for Intertek Korea.

The new Intertek office in Gunpo spans five operational floors at the Intertek Building, offering a 10-m electromagnetic compatibility (EMC) chamber with additional chambers for safety and EMC testing of electrical and wireless products. These new facilities offer testing capabilities for both EU and US markets, covering safety, energy efficiency, chemical, EMC, and radio frequency testing.

== Twin towns – sister cities ==
=== Sister cities (domestic) ===
- Yecheon County, North Gyeongsang Province (1998)
- Changnyeong County, South Gyeongsang (2022)
- Muan County, South Jeolla Province (1998)
- Yangyang County, Gangwon Province (1999)
- Buyeo County, South Chungcheong Province (1999)
- Cheongyang County, South Chungcheong Province (2003)

=== Sister cities (international) ===
- Belleville, Ontario, Canada (1997)
- Clarksville, Tennessee, United States (1999)
- Grant County, Washington, United States (2003)
- Atsugi, Kanagawa, Japan (2005)
- Linyi, Shandong, China (2012)

== See also ==
- List of cities in South Korea
- Geography of South Korea
- Sanbon
