= Ansan station =

Metro station in Ansan, South Korea

안산; Ansan
안산; Ansan
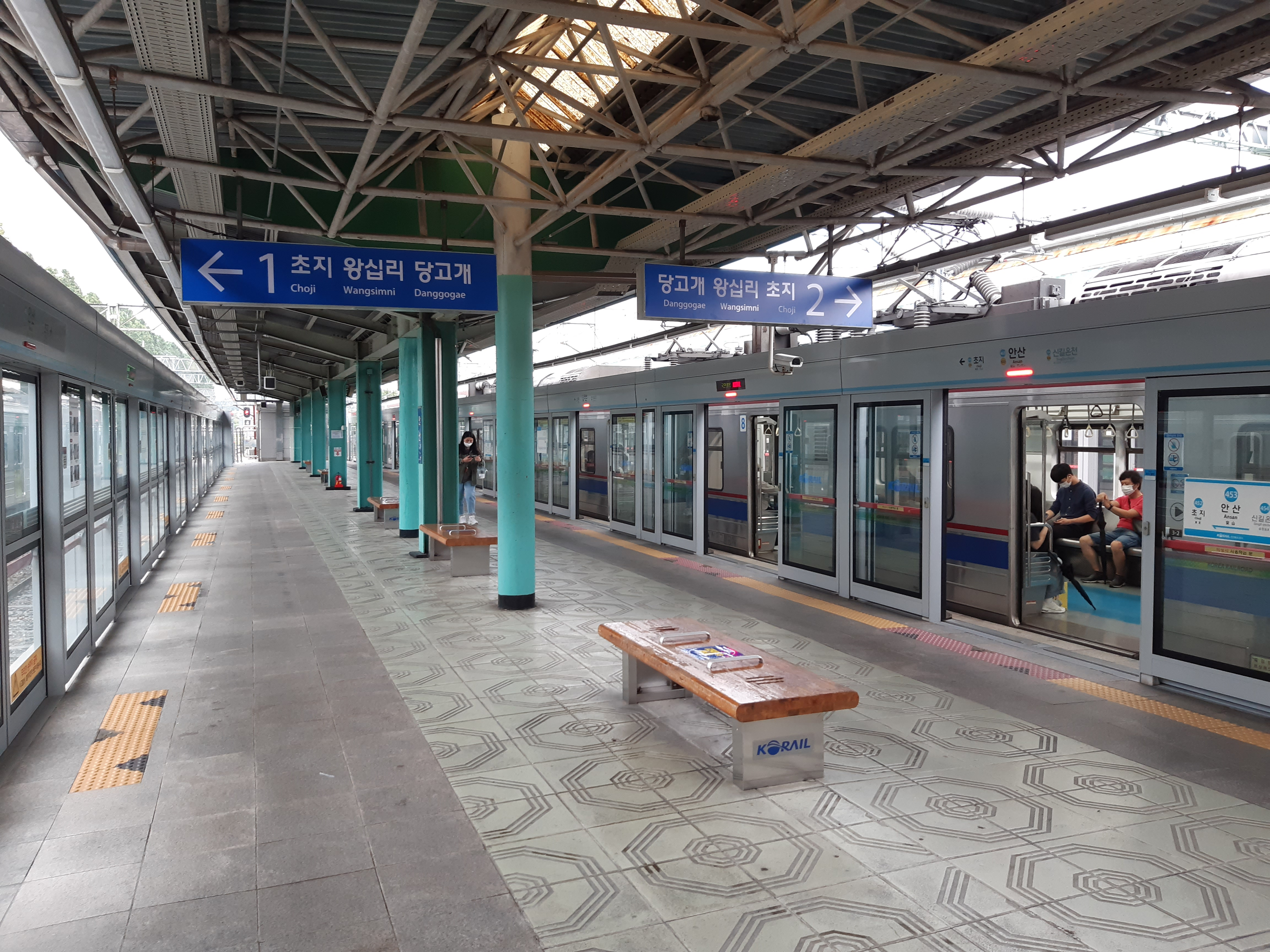

Korean name
- Hangul: 안산역
- Hanja: 安山驛
- RR: Ansan-yeok
- MR: Ansan-yŏk

General information
- Location: 726-63 Wongok-dong, 462 Jungangdaero, Danwon-gu, Ansan-si, Gyeonggi-do
- Coordinates: 37°19′38″N 126°47′18″E
- Operator: Korail
- Line: Ansan Line
- Platforms: 2
- Tracks: 4

Construction
- Structure type: Aboveground

History
- Opened: October 25, 1988 (as part of Line 1)

Key dates
- April 1, 1994: Line 1 service transferred to Line 4
- September 12, 2020: Suin–Bundang Line opened

Services
Preceding station	Seoul Metropolitan Subway	Following station
Choji towards Jinjeop	Line 4	Singiloncheon towards Oido
Choji towards Buramsan	Line 4 Express	Jeongwang towards Oido
Choji towards Cheongnyangni	Suin–Bundang Line	Singiloncheon towards Incheon
Location

Ansan station (Korean: 안산; Hanja: 安山) is a subway station on Seoul Subway Line 4 and the Suin–Bundang Line of the Seoul Metropolitan Subway. The station is located in the Wongok neighborhood of Ansan, Korea and is one of multiple stations serving the city. Wongok-dong, where the station is located, is home to many foreign workers working at Banwol Industrial Complex as it is lined with multi-family houses that are convenient for transportation and can get rooms at low cost.

Before the extension of Line 4 to Oido station, Ansan station served as the line's terminus station. It is still a terminal station for some trains. It is located close to the factory section of the town. There are many restaurants and shops located around the station. Ansan has a large and growing foreign community living in this neighborhood and there are many foreign restaurants close to the station.

== Station layout ==
L2; Platforms	Southbound Local	Line 4 toward Oido (Singiloncheon) →
L2; Platforms	Island platform, doors will open on the left, right
L2; Platforms	Southbound Express	Line 4 toward Oido (Jeongwang) →
L2; Platforms	Northbound Express	← Line 4 toward Buramsan (Choji)
L2; Platforms	Island platform, doors will open on the left, right
L2; Platforms	Northbound Local	← Line 4 toward Jinjeop (Choji)

L1; Concourse	Lobby	Customer Service, Shops, Vending machines, ATMs

G	Street level	Exit

== Passengers ==
Station	Passengers						
Station	2000	2001	2002	2003	2004	2005	2006
Line 4 (Seoul Metro)	14916	13972	14988	15354	11884	11195	11769
