= ByeollaeByeolgaram station =

Station of the Seoul Metropolitan Subway

별내별가람; ByeollaeByeolgaram
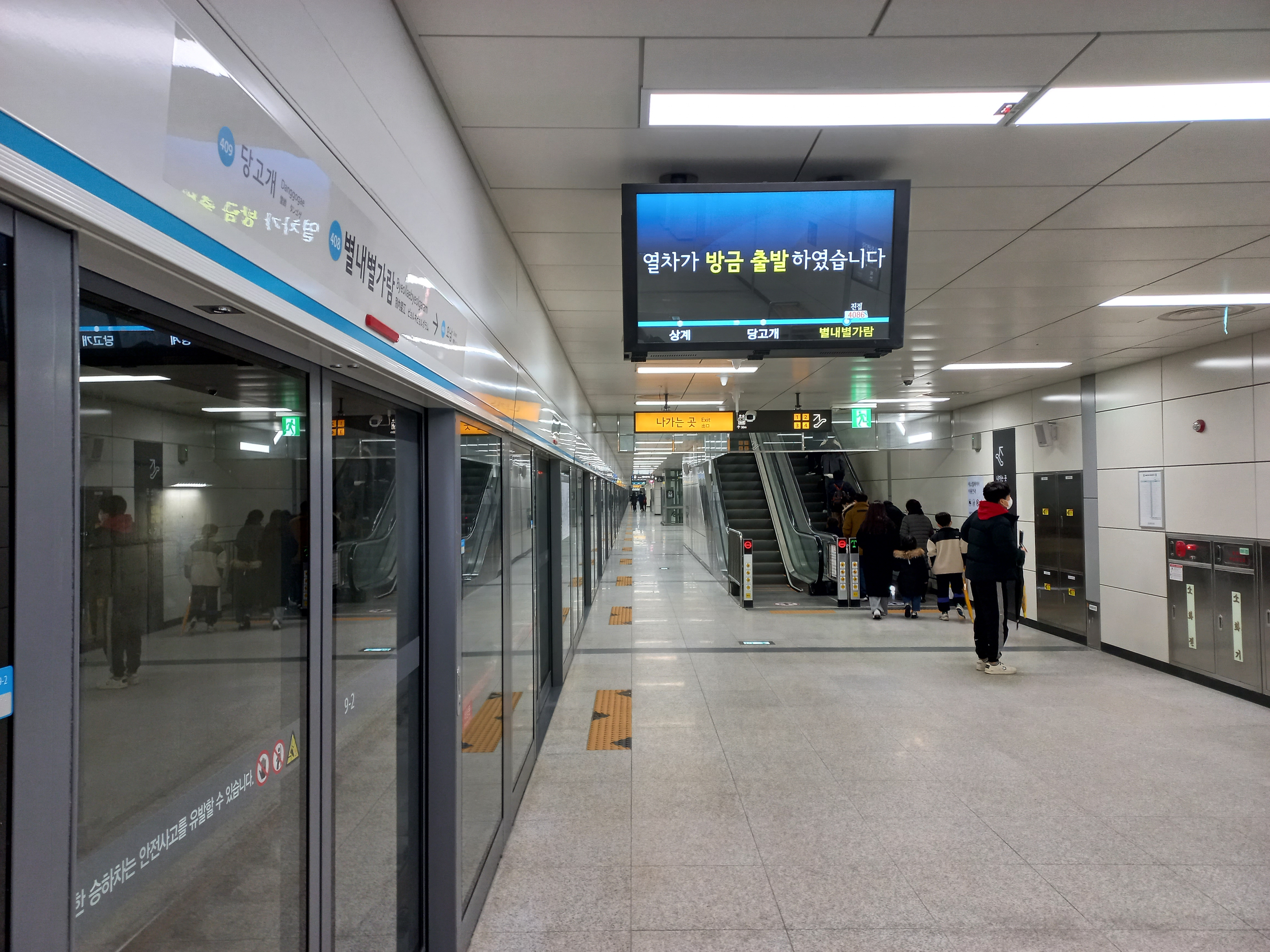

Korean name
- Hangul: 별내별가람역
- Hanja: 別內별가람驛
- Revised Romanization: Byeollaebyeolgaram-yeok
- McCune–Reischauer: Pyŏllaebyŏlgaram-yŏk

General information
- Location: Byeollae-dong, Namyangju-si, Gyeonggi-do
- Coordinates: 37.6678°N 127.1163°E
- Operator: Namyangju City Urban Corporation
- Line: Line 4
- Platforms: 2 (2 side platforms)
- Tracks: 2

Construction
- Structure type: Underground

History
- Opened: March 19, 2022

Services
Preceding station	Seoul Metropolitan Subway	Following station
Onam towards Jinjeop	Line 4	Buramsan towards Oido
Location

ByeollaeByeolgaram station (Korean: 별내별가람) is an underground station of the Seoul Subway Line 4 in Namyangju, Gyeonggi Province, South Korea.

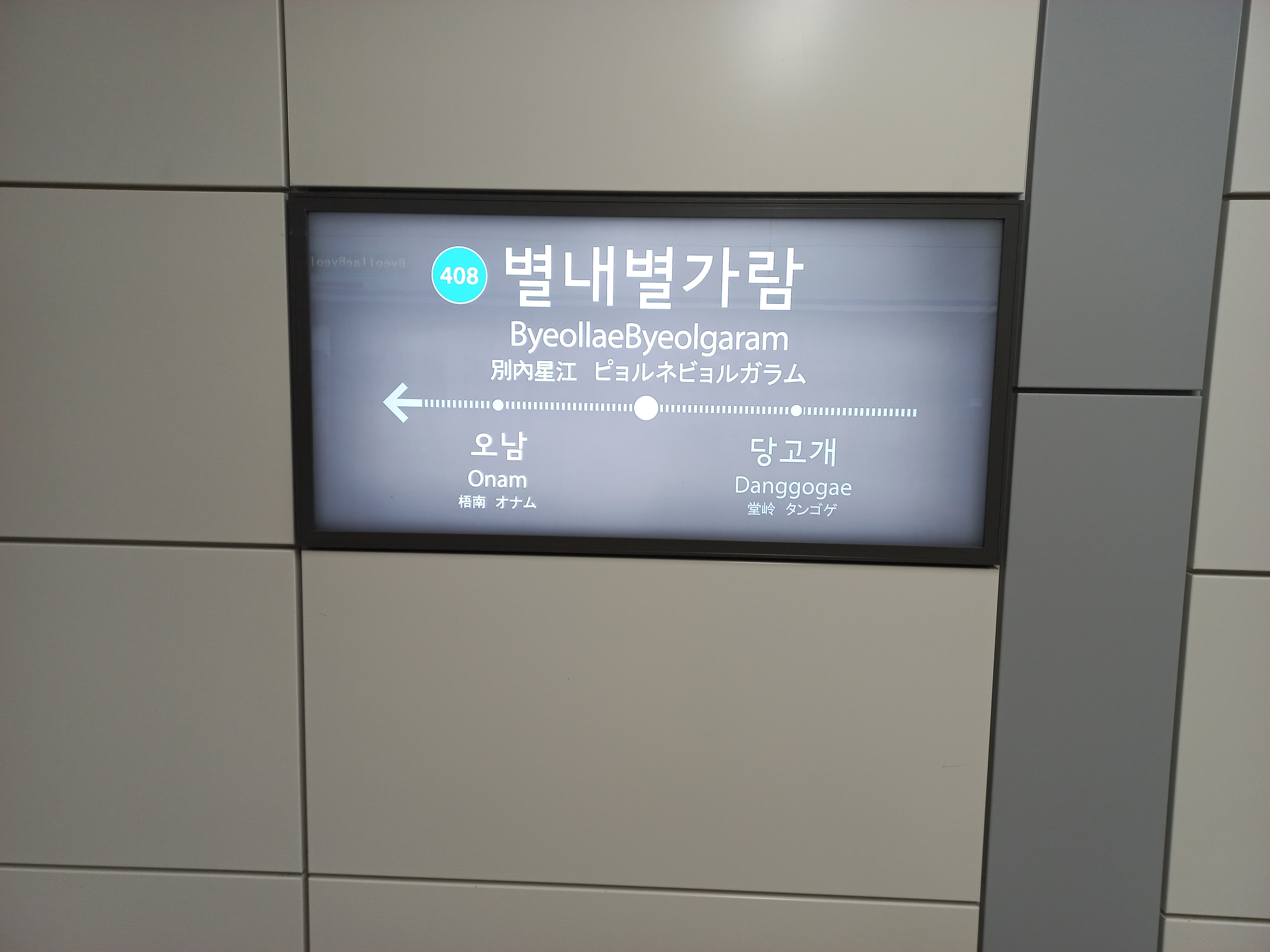

== Station layout ==
G	Street level	Exit

L1; Concourse	Lobby	Customer Service, Shops, Vending machines, ATMs

L2; Platforms	Side platform, doors will open on the right
L2; Platforms	Northbound	← Line 4 toward Jinjeop (Onam)
L2; Platforms	Southbound	Line 4 toward Oido (Buramsan) →
L2; Platforms	Side platform, doors will open on the right
