= Jeongwang station =

Train station in South Korea

정왕 (시화병원); Jeongwang (Shihwa Hospital)
정왕 (시화병원); Jeongwang (Shihwa Hospital)
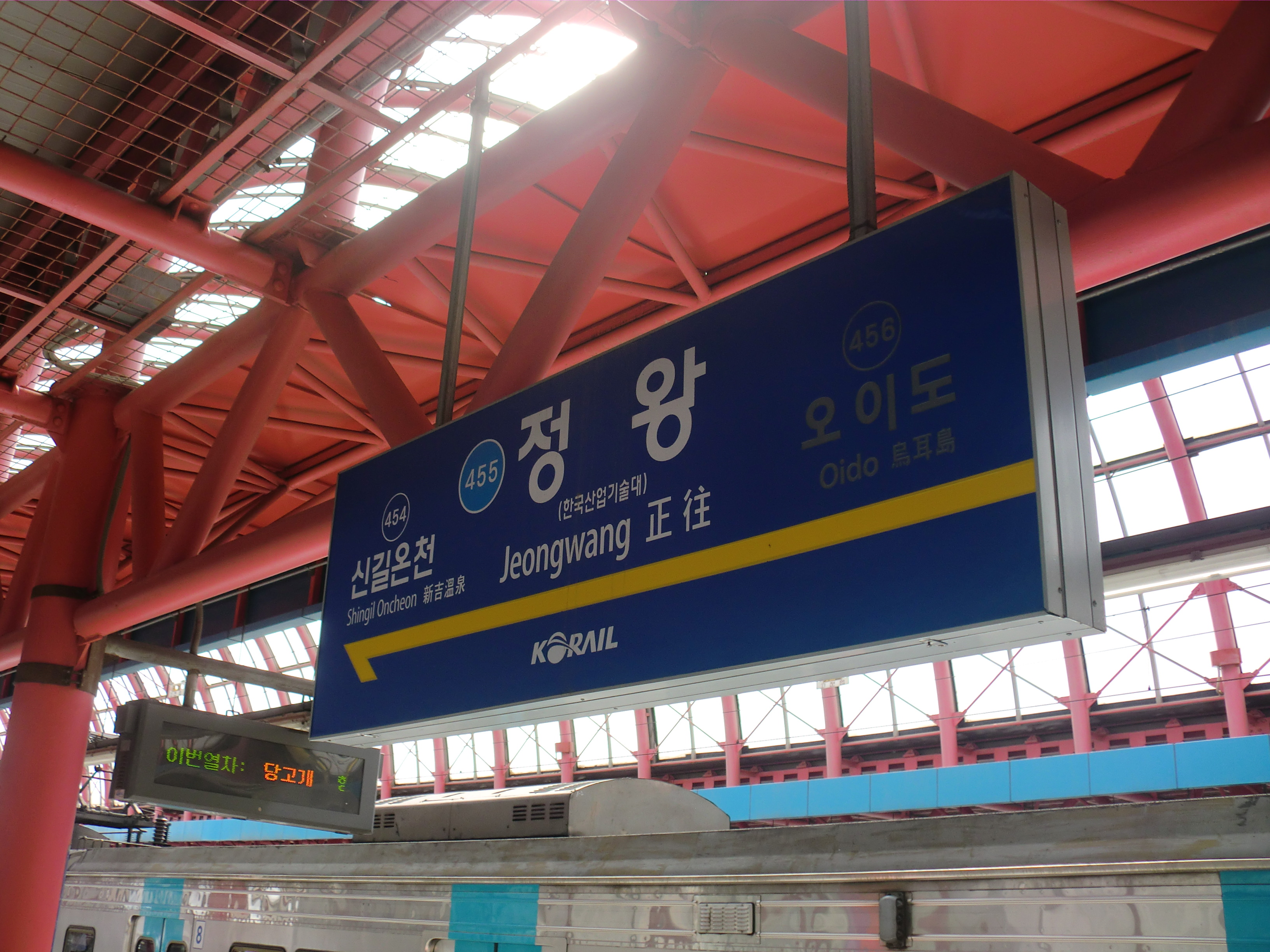

Korean name
- Hangul: 정왕역
- Hanja: 正往驛
- Revised Romanization: Jeongwangnyeok
- McCune–Reischauer: Chŏngwangnyŏk

General information
- Location: 2325-12 Jeongwang-dong, 15 Bongil 418 Mayuro, Siheung-si, Gyeonggi-do
- Coordinates: 37.35166°N 126.74279°E
- Operator: Korail
- Lines: Line 4 Suin–Bundang Line
- Platforms: 2
- Tracks: 2

Construction
- Structure type: Aboveground

Key dates
- July 28, 2000: Line 4 opened
- September 12, 2020: Suin–Bundang Line opened
Location

Jeongwang station (Korean: 정왕역) is a station on Seoul Subway Line 4 and the Suin–Bundang Line located in the Jeongwang-dong area of Siheung, South Korea. Its secondary station name is Shihwa Hospital. The name of the station originated from the local name.

This station has a significantly higher ridership compared to neighboring Oido station. There are many restaurants and shops located close to the station including a large E-Mart.

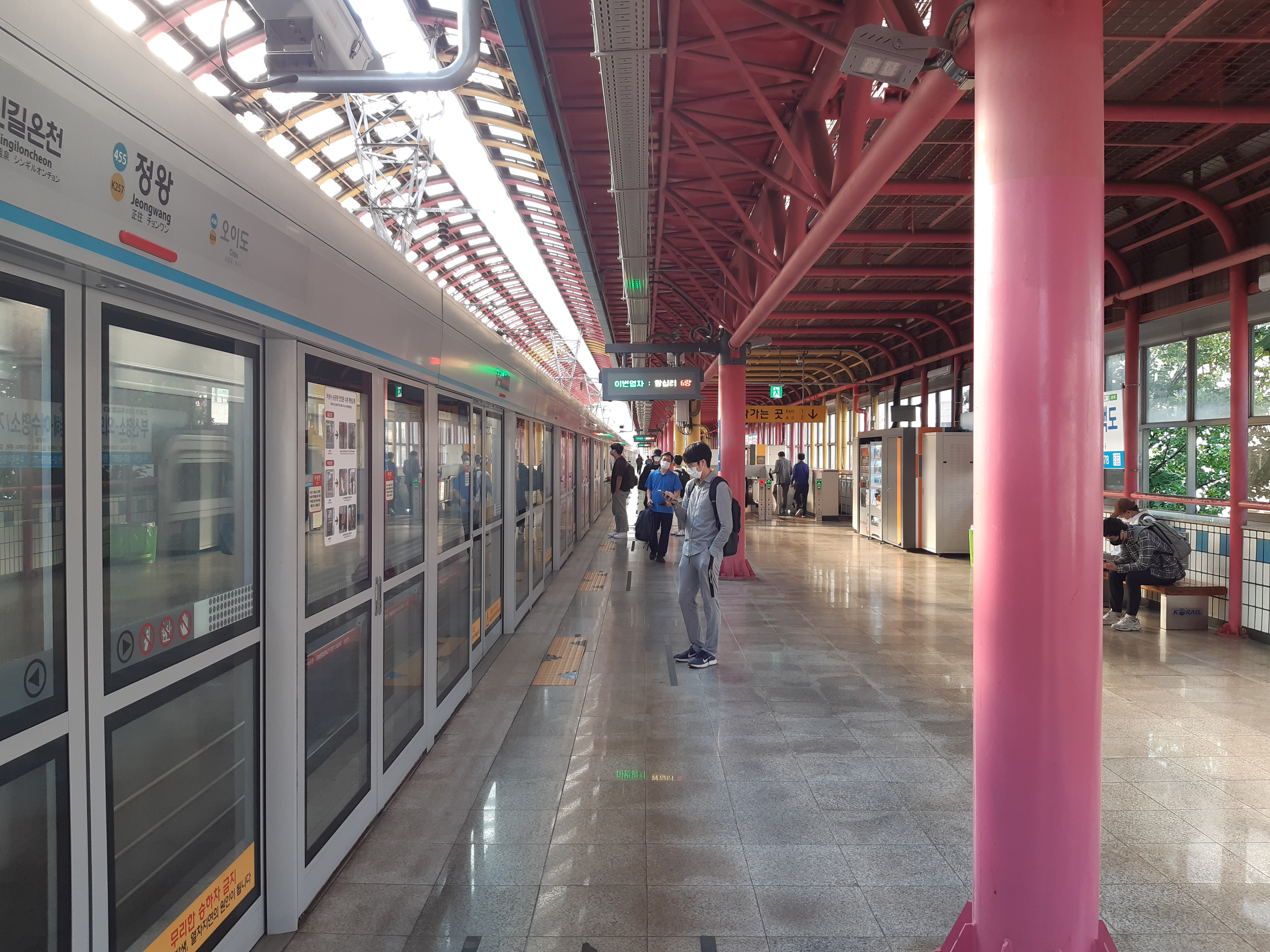

== Station layout ==
L2; Platforms	Side platform, doors will open on the left
L2; Platforms	Southbound Local/Express	Ansan Line toward Oido (Terminus) →
L2; Platforms	Northbound Local/Express	← Ansan Line toward Jinjeop or Buramsan (Singiloncheon) (Local) or (Ansan) (Express)
L2; Platforms	Side platform, doors will open on the left

L1; Concourse	Lobby	Customer Service, Shops, Vending machines, ATMs

G	Street level	Exit

== Ridership ==
Station	Passengers						
Station	2000	2001	2002	2003	2004	2005	2006
Seoul Subway Line 4	2511	3804	5976	7573	6614	6702	6986

Preceding station	Seoul Metropolitan Subway	Following station
Singiloncheon towards Jinjeop	Line 4 Local	Oido Terminus
Ansan towards Buramsan	Line 4 Express	Oido Terminus
Singiloncheon towards Cheongnyangni	Suin–Bundang Line	Oido towards Incheon
