= Sanggye station =

Train station in Seoul, South Korea

상계; Sanggye
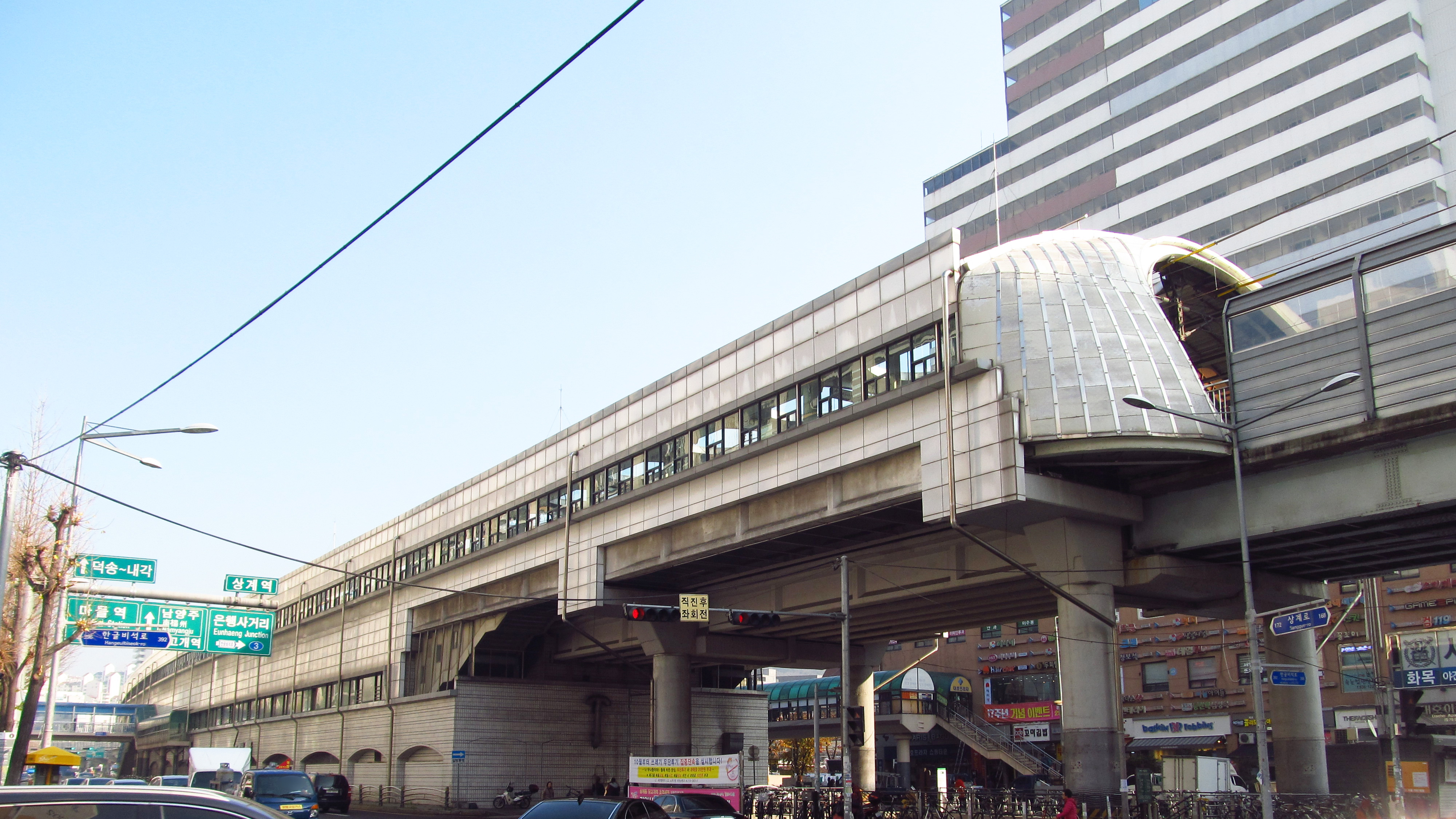
- A view of Sanggye station

Korean name
- Hangul: 상계역
- Hanja: 上溪驛
- Revised Romanization: Sanggye-yeok
- McCune–Reischauer: Sanggye-yŏk

General information
- Location: 182 Sanggye-ro, 156-203 Sanggye 5-dong, Nowon-gu, Seoul
- Coordinates: 37°39′39″N 127°04′24″E
- Operator: Seoul Metro
- Line: Line 4
- Platforms: 2
- Tracks: 2

Construction
- Structure type: Aboveground

History
- Opened: April 20, 1985

Passengers
- (Daily) Based on Jan-Dec of 2012. Line 4: 44,024

Services
Preceding station	Seoul Metropolitan Subway	Following station
Buramsan towards Jinjeop	Line 4	Nowon towards Oido
Location

Sanggye Station is a station on Line 4 of the Seoul Metropolitan Subway network in Nowon-gu, Seoul. It is named after the upper valley of the Suraksan mountain nearby.

The station has 4 exits and is also connected with Daeho Department Store. The name of the subway station comes from its local name. The local name is the name of a nearby river.

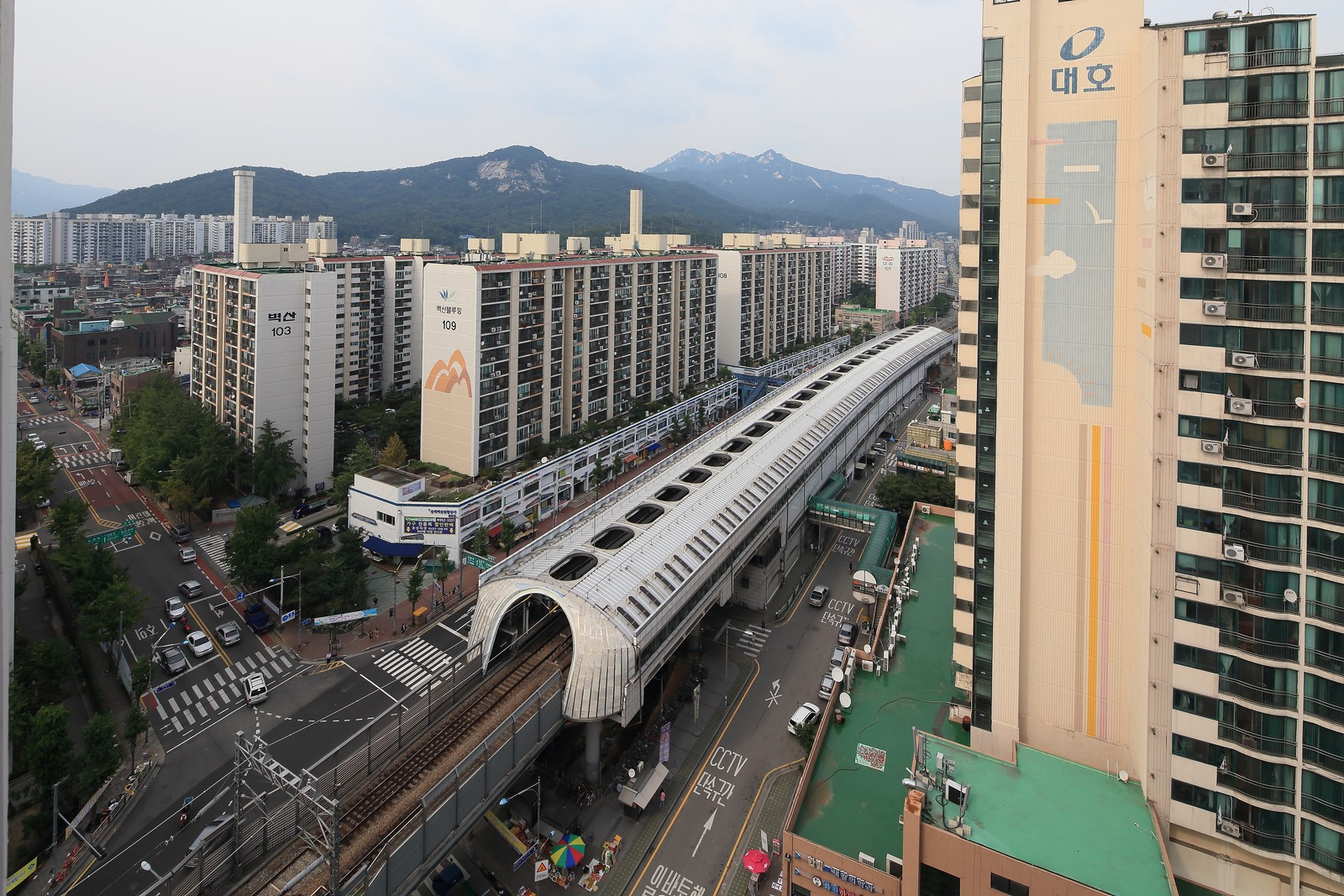
Aerial view of Sanggye station

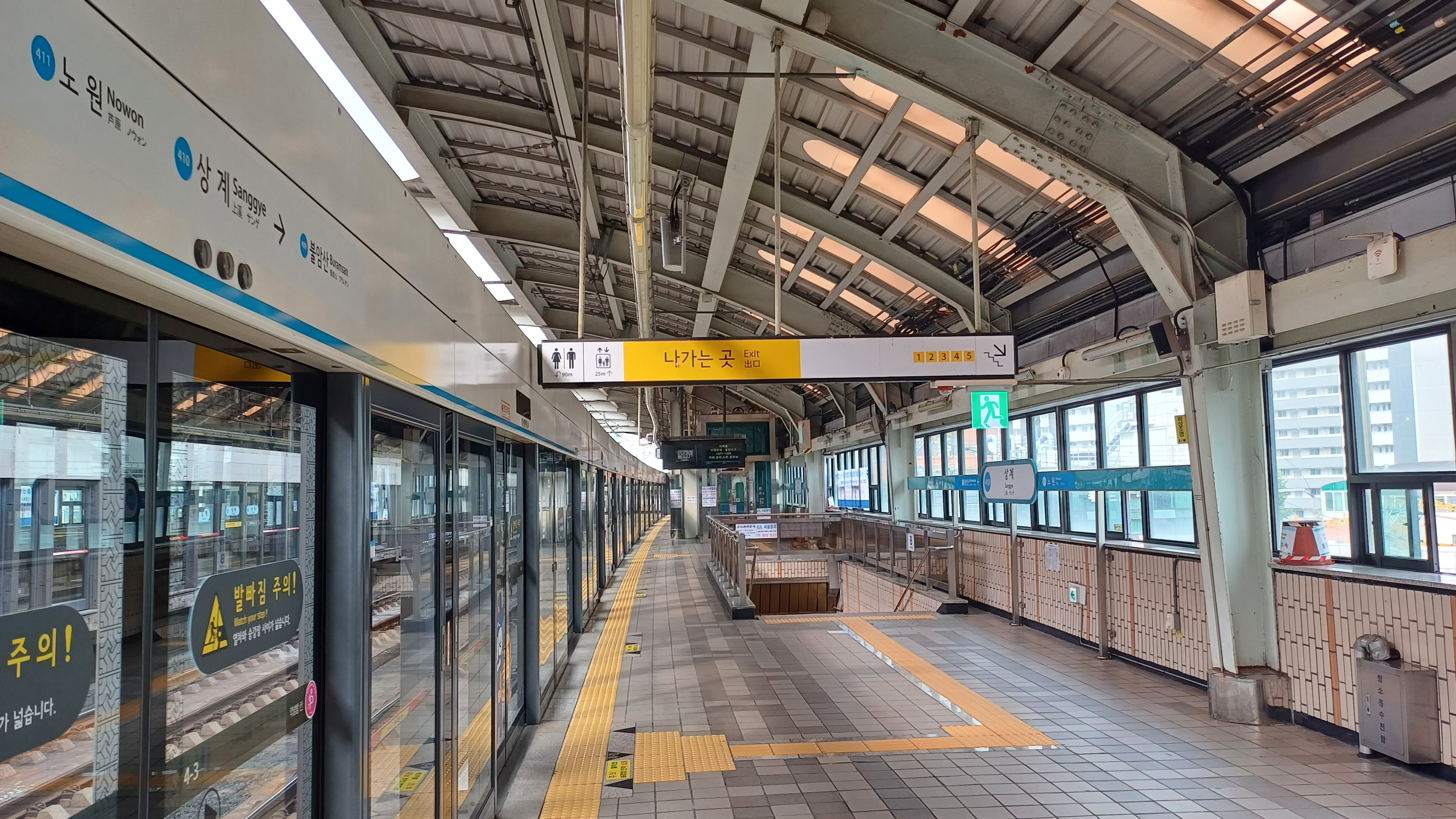
The platform

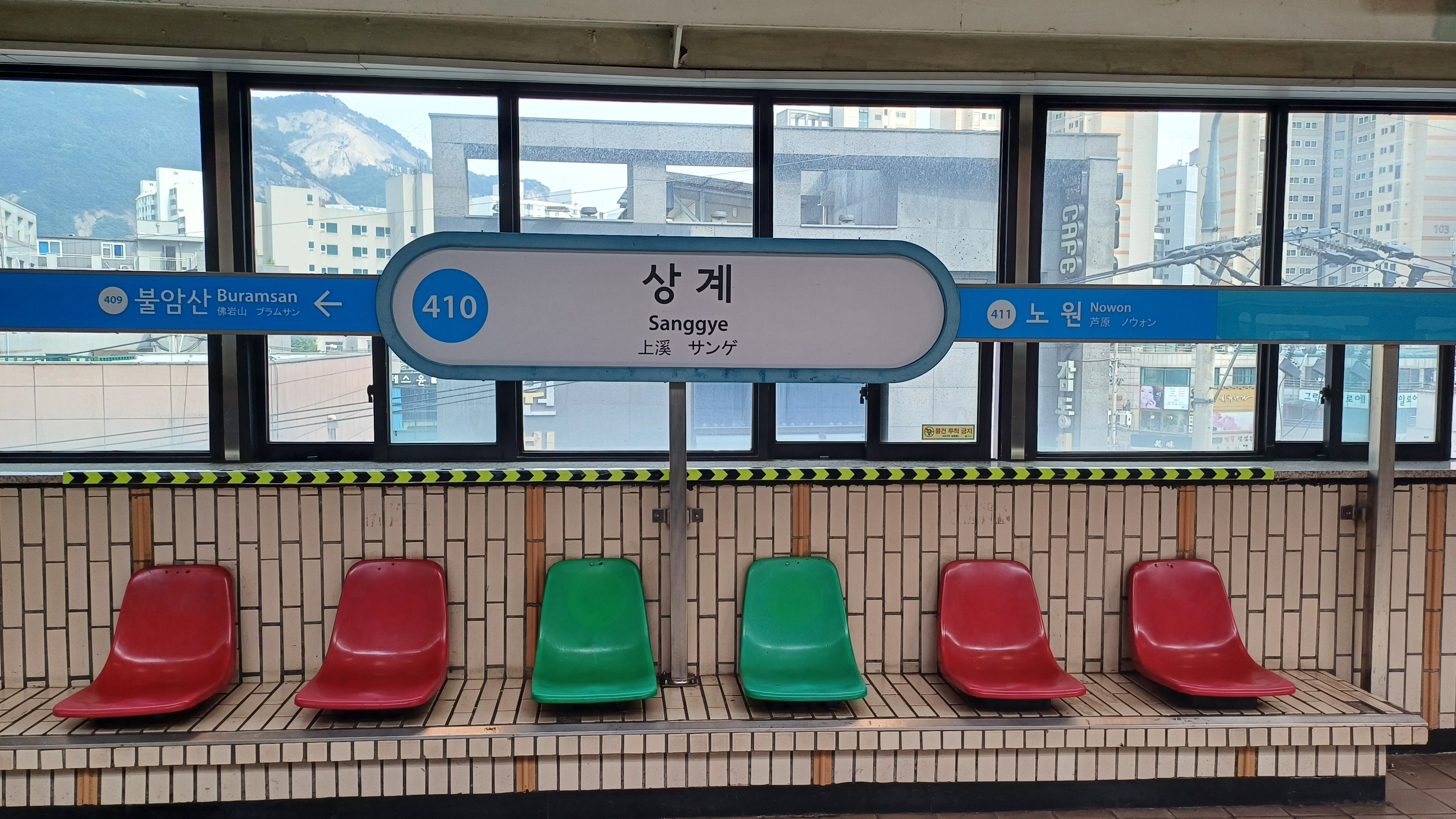
Station nameplate

== Station layout ==
L2; Platforms	Side platform, doors will open on the right
L2; Platforms	Northbound	← Line 4 toward Jinjeop (Buramsan)
L2; Platforms	Southbound	Line 4 toward Oido (Nowon) →
L2; Platforms	Side platform, doors will open on the right

L1; Concourse	Lobby	Customer Service, Shops, Vending machines, ATMs

G	Street level	Exit
