= Singiloncheon station =

Metro station in Ansan, South Korea

Coordinates: 37.33818°N 126.76575°E

신길온천; Singiloncheon
신길온천; Singiloncheon
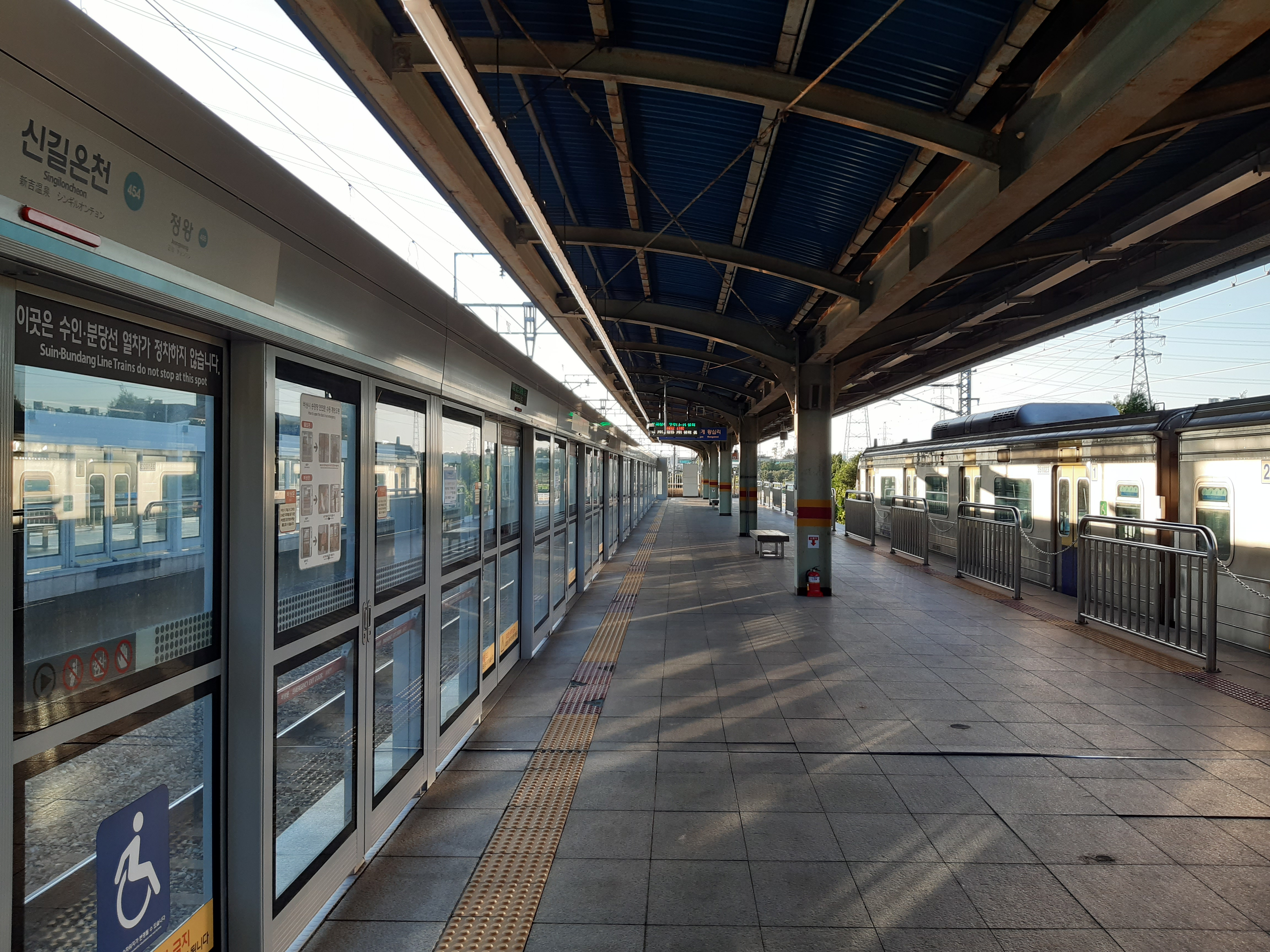

Korean name
- Hangul: 신길온천역
- Hanja: 新吉溫泉驛
- RR: Singironcheon-yeok
- MR: Sin'gironch'ŏn-yŏk

General information
- Location: 216-2 Singil-dong, 2 Hwanggogaero, Danwon-gu, Ansan-si, Gyeonggi-do
- Operator: Korail
- Lines: Line 4 Suin–Bundang Line
- Platforms: 2
- Tracks: 4

Construction
- Structure type: Aboveground

Key dates
- July 28, 2000: Line 4 opened
- September 12, 2020: Suin–Bundang Line opened
Location

Singiloncheon station (Korean: 신길온천역) is a railway station on Seoul Subway Line 4 and the Suin–Bundang Line in Ansan, Korea.

As hot springs were expected to be developed at the time of the station's opening, the station was opened as Singiloncheon station (lit. 'Singil hot spring station'). However, the station was renamed on January 20, 2021, due to the lack of development of hot springs around the station. This name change was suspended a few months after.

== Station layout ==
L2; Platforms
L2; Platforms	Island platform, doors will open on the left
L2; Platforms	Southbound Local	Ansan Line toward Oido (Jeongwang) →
L2; Platforms	Northbound Local	← Ansan Line toward Jinjeop (Ansan)
L2; Platforms	Island platform, doors will open on the left

L1; Concourse	Lobby	Customer Service, Shops, Vending machines, ATMs

G	Street level	Exit

== Gallery ==
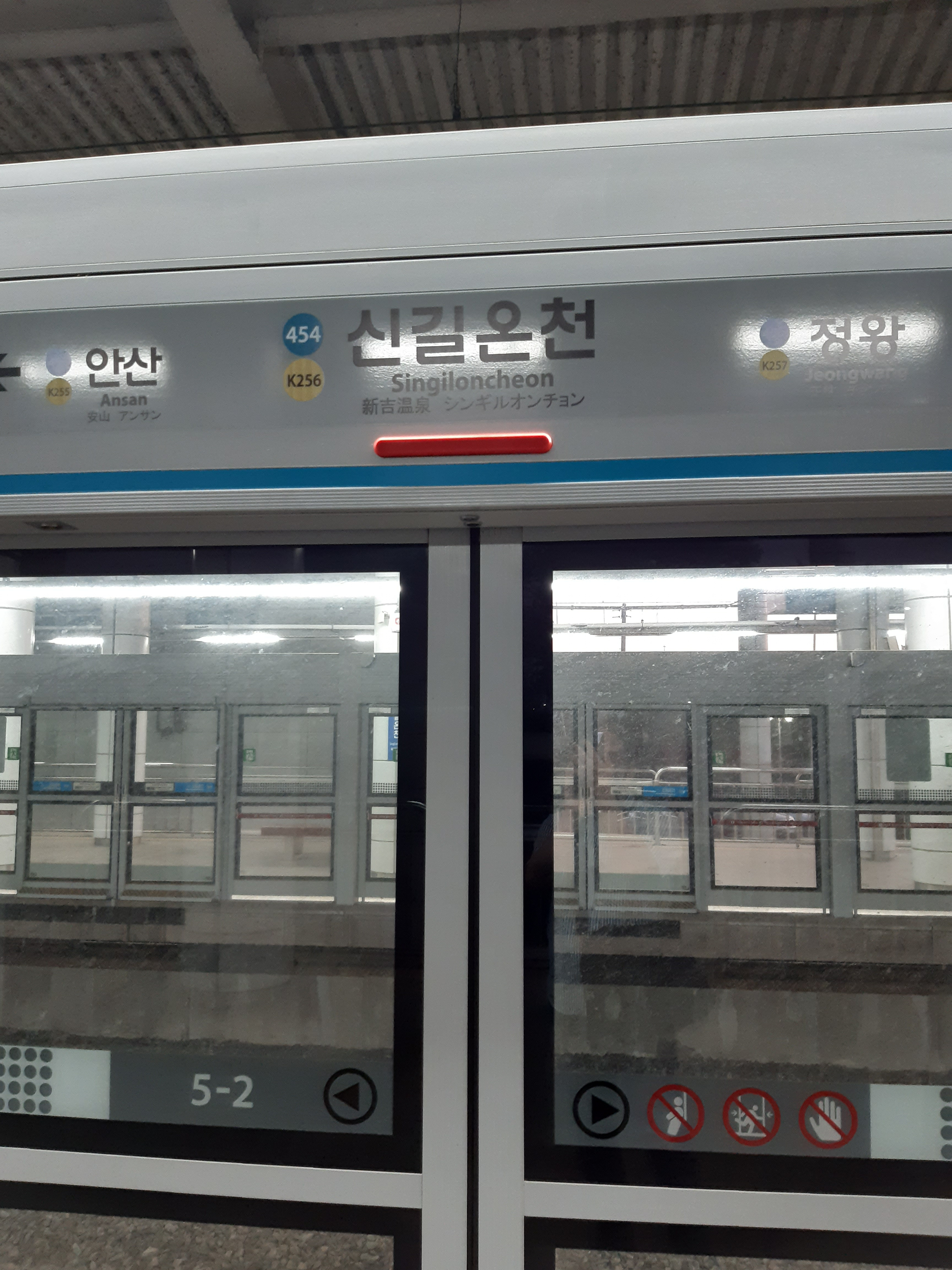
Screen doors in 2020

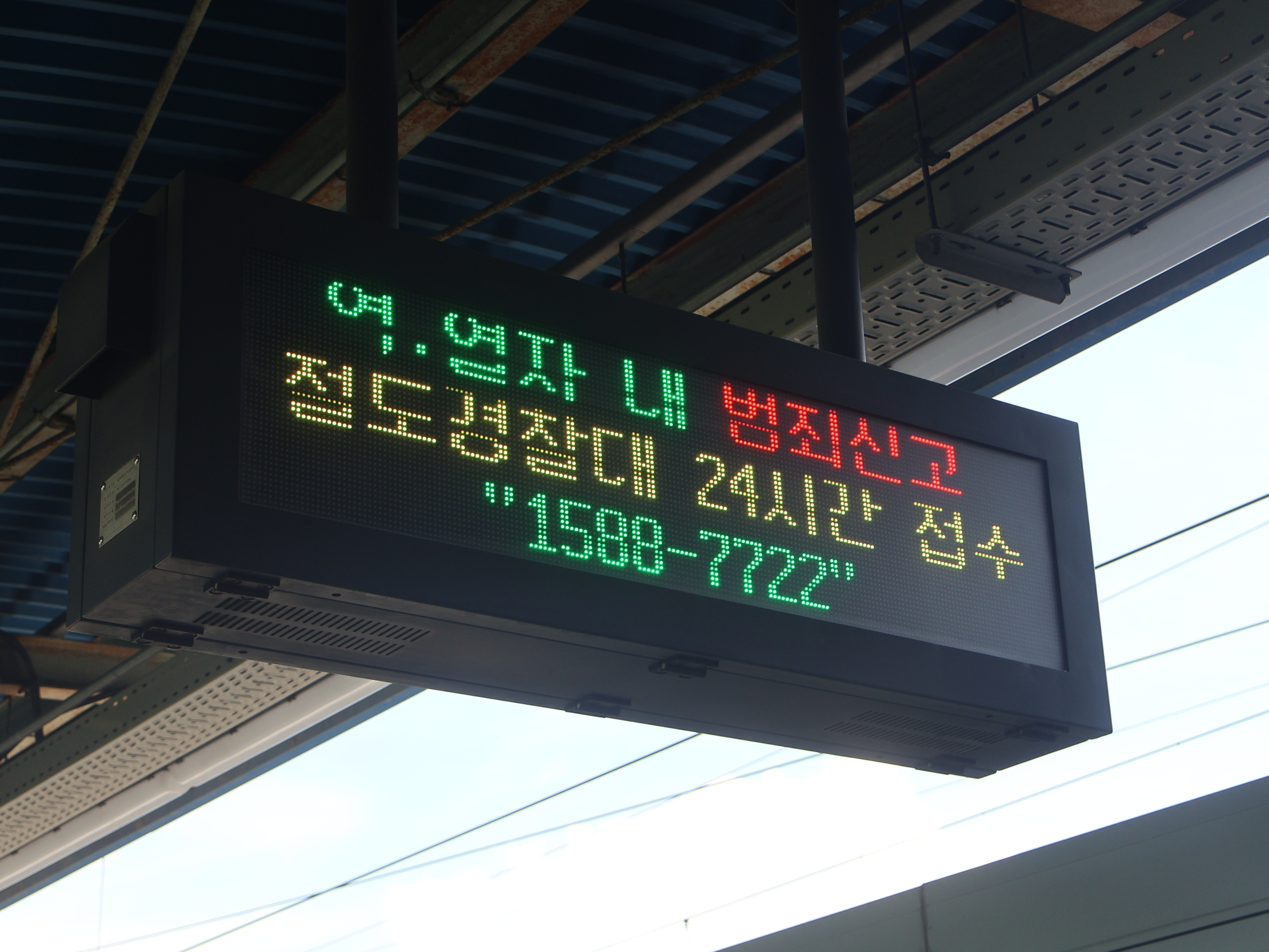
Screen doors in 2024

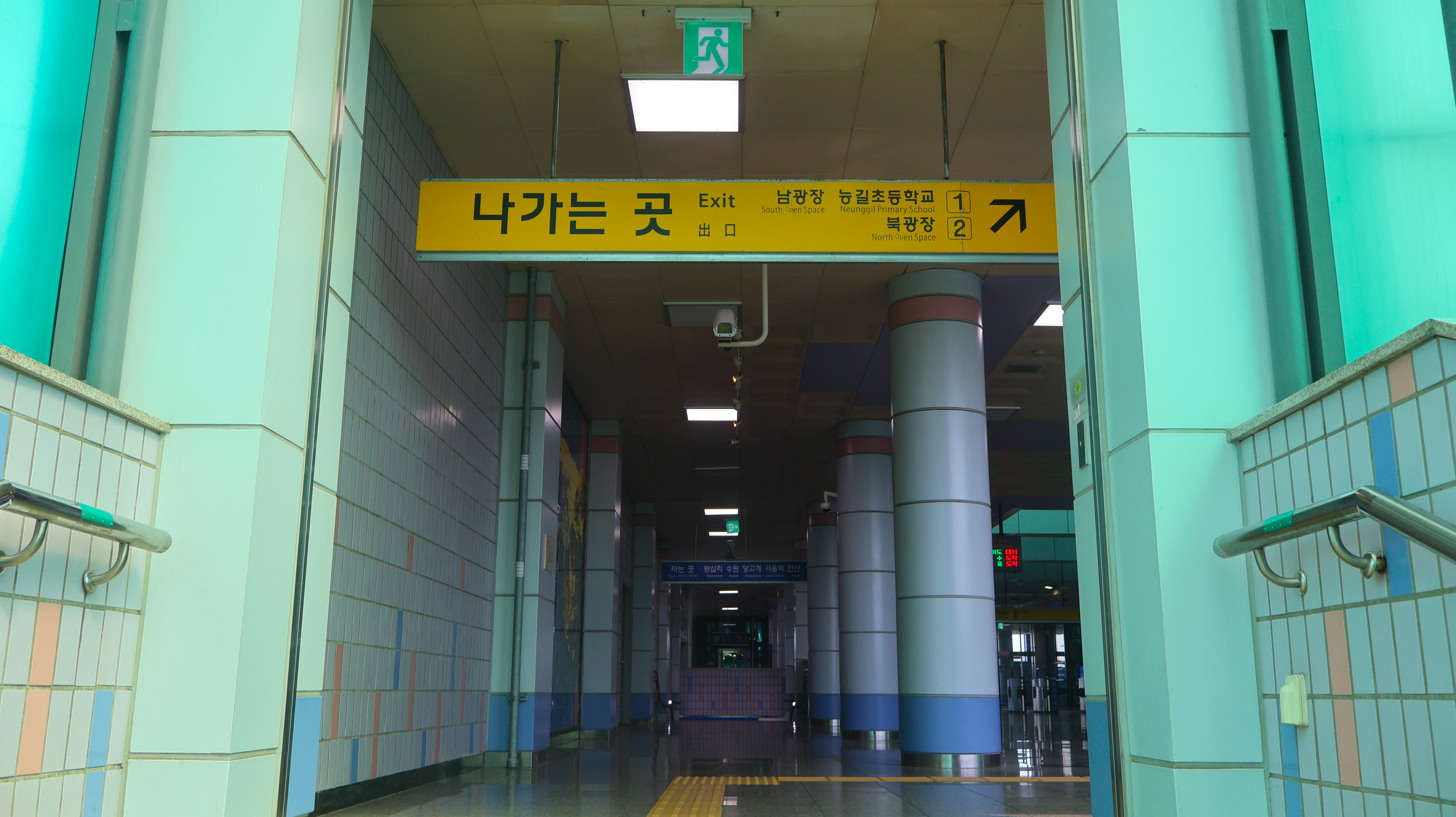
Exit 1

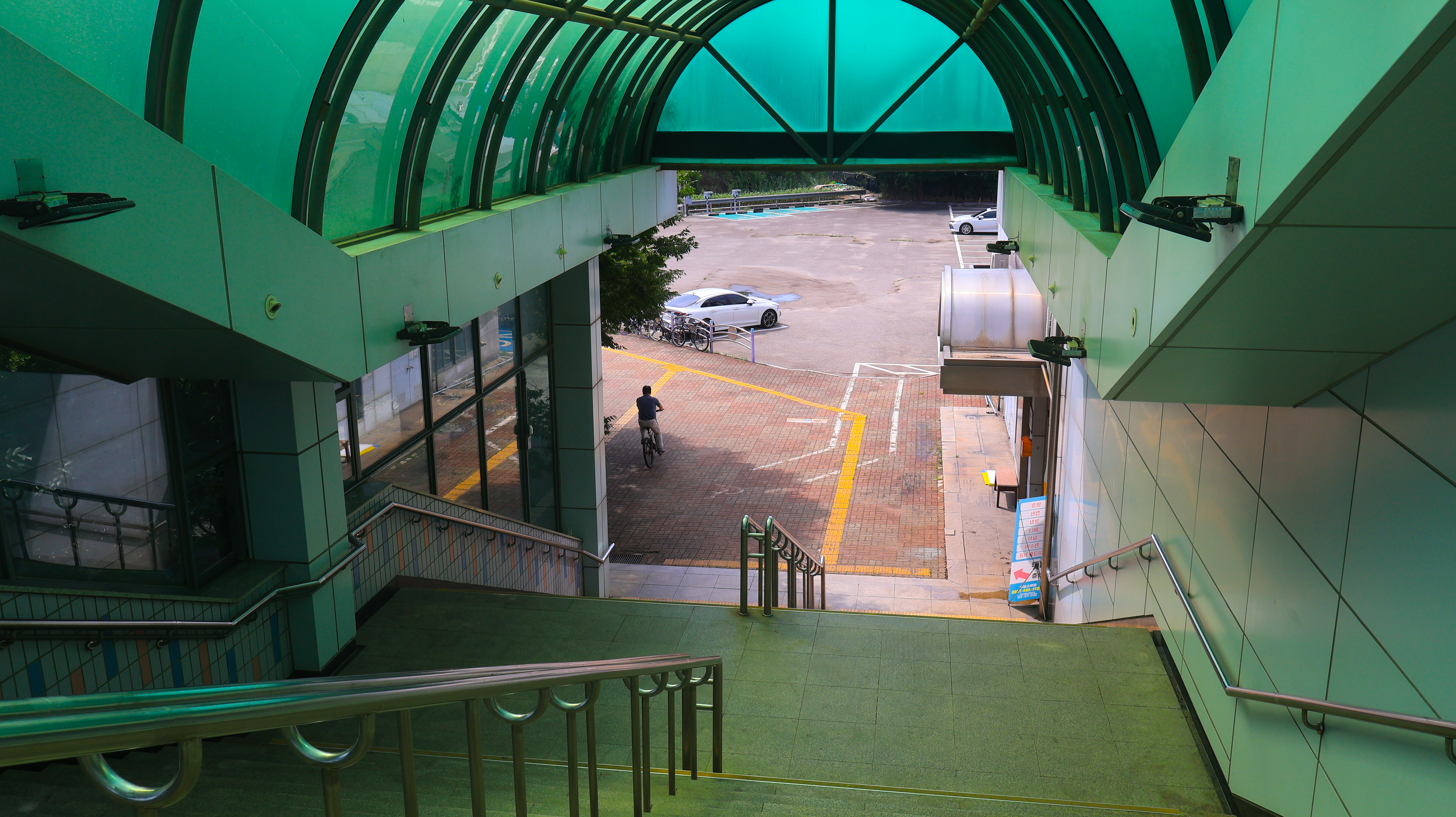
Stairs of Exit 1

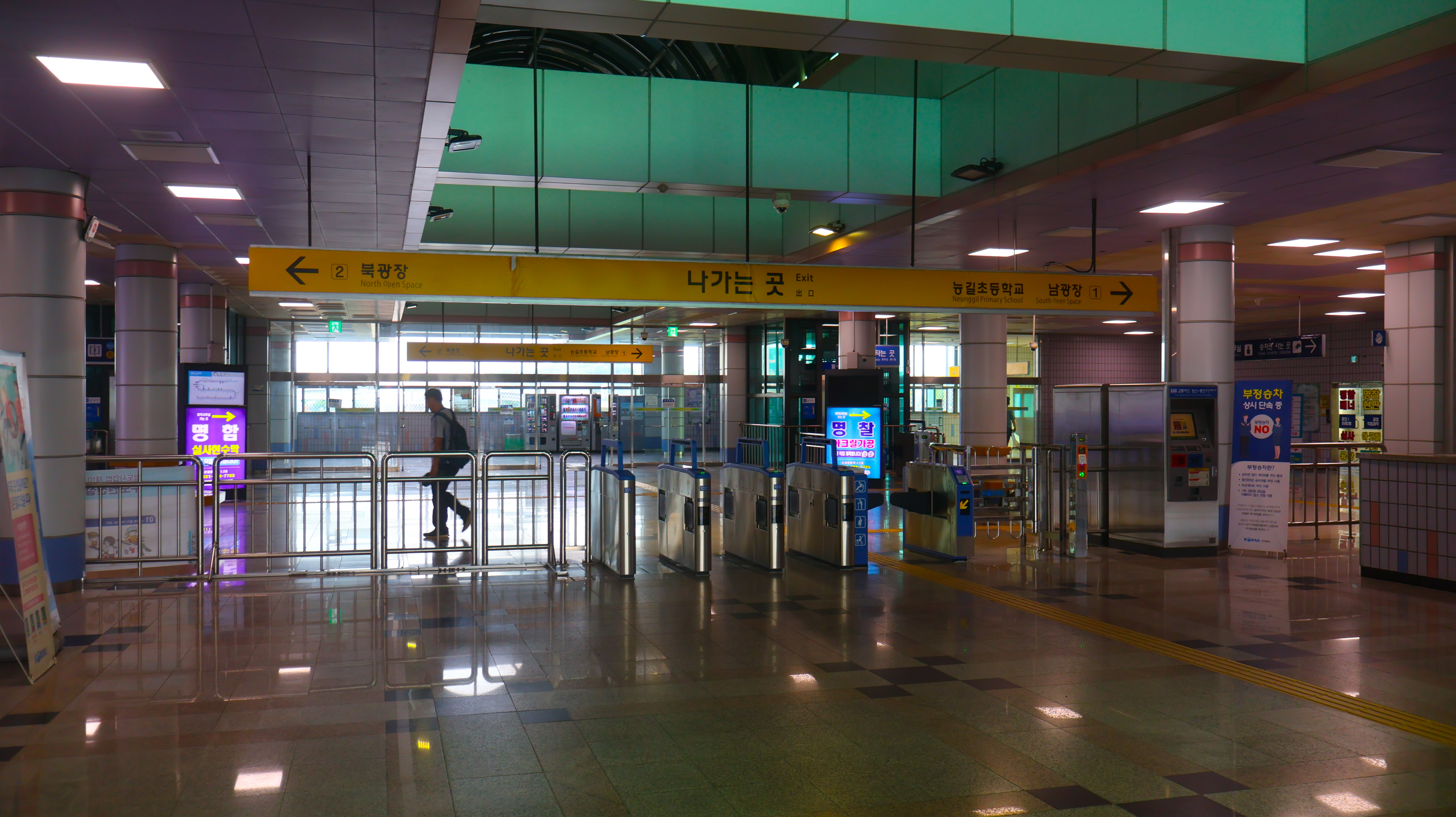
Turnstile

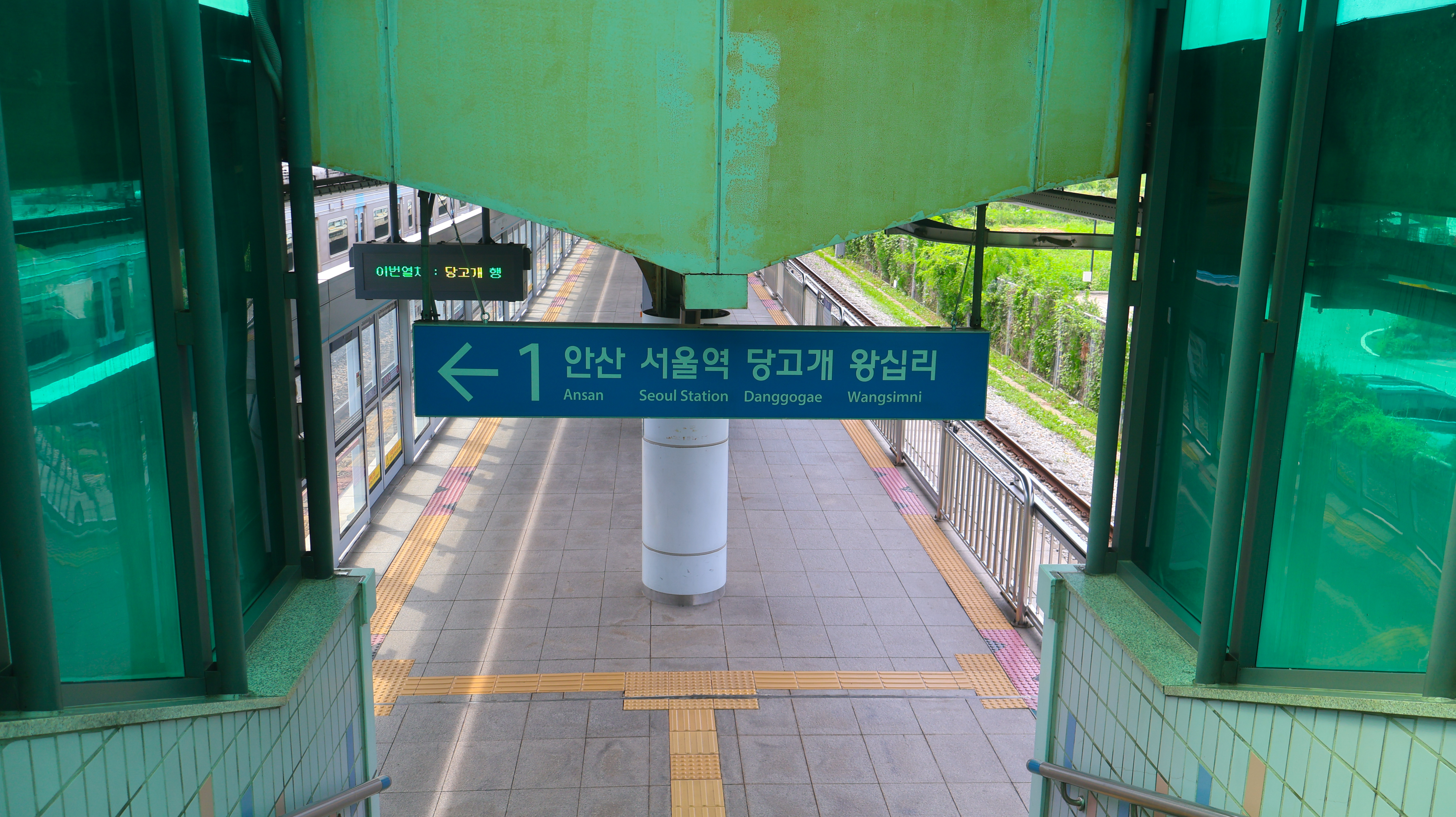
Platforms

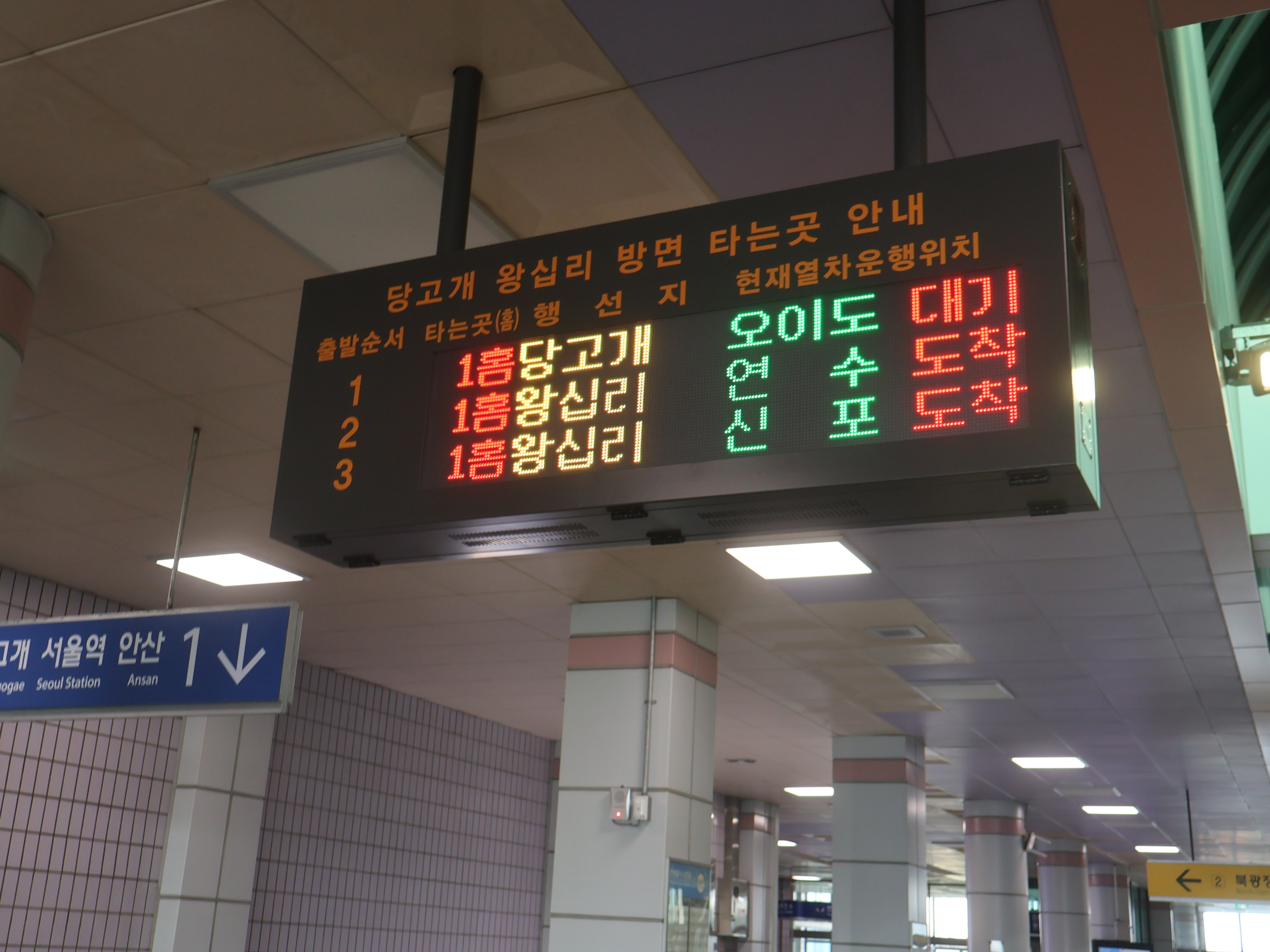
Display board (waiting room)

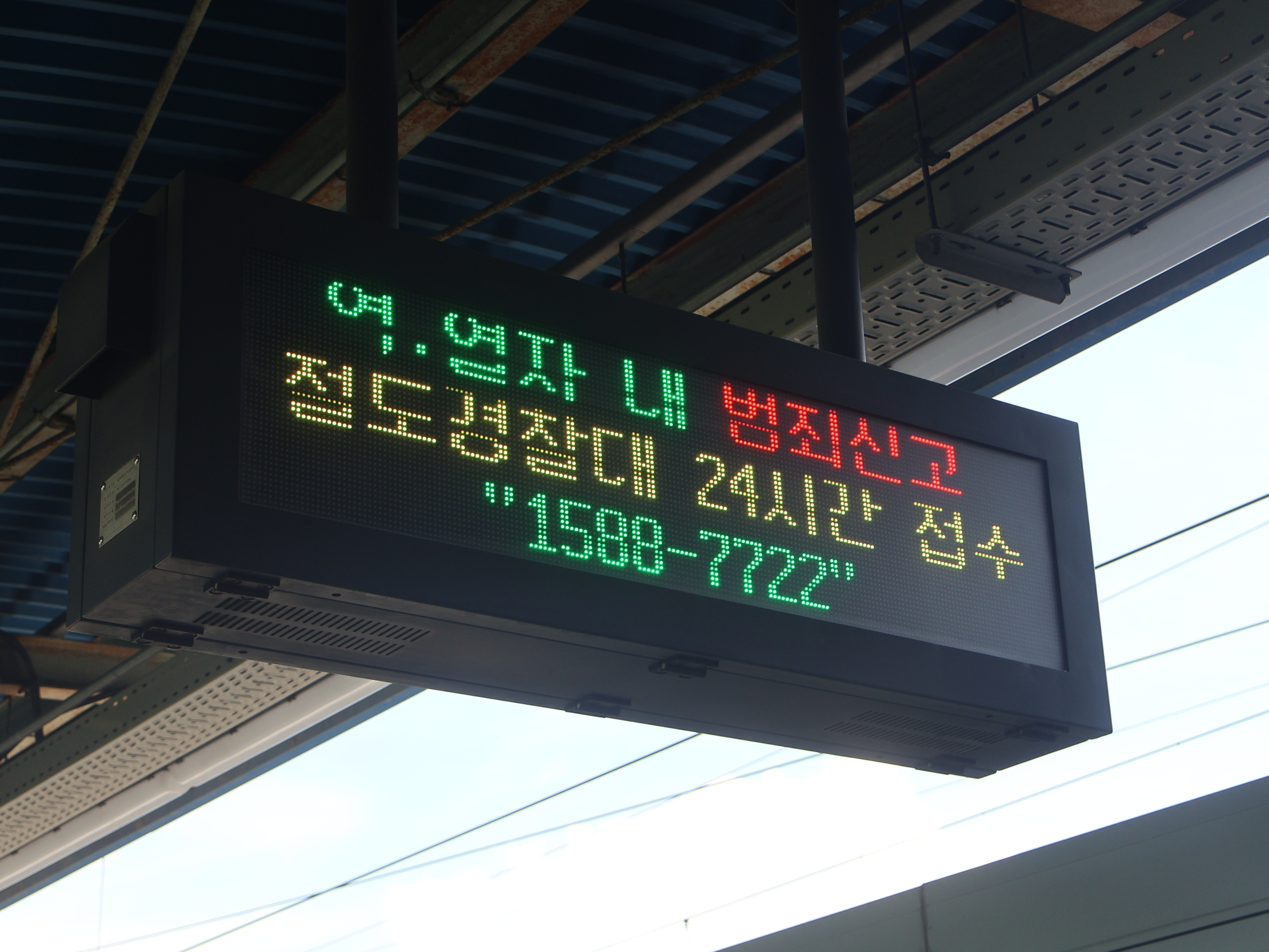
Display board (platforms)

Preceding station	Seoul Metropolitan Subway	Following station
Ansan towards Jinjeop	Line 4	Jeongwang towards Oido
Ansan towards Cheongnyangni	Suin–Bundang Line	Jeongwang towards Incheon
