= Onam station =

Underground train station in Namyangju, South Korea

오남; Onam
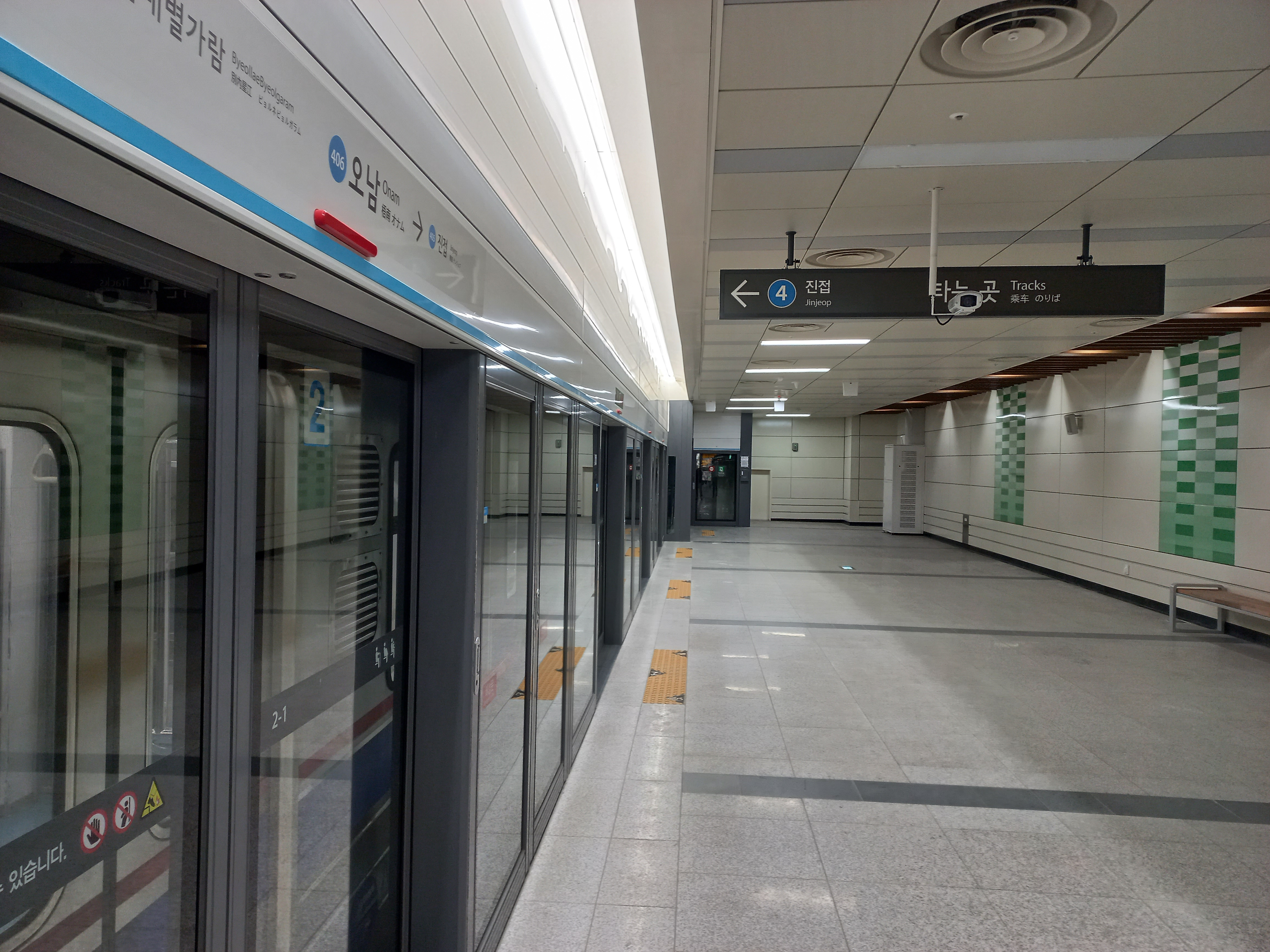

Korean name
- Hangul: 오남역
- Hanja: 梧南驛
- RR: Onam-yeok
- MR: Onam-yŏk

General information
- Location: Onam-eup, Namyangju-si, Gyeonggi-do
- Coordinates: 37.7053°N 127.1913°E
- Operator: Namyangju City Urban Corporation
- Line: Line 4
- Platforms: 2 (2 side platforms)
- Tracks: 2

Construction
- Structure type: Underground

History
- Opened: March 19, 2022

Services
Preceding station	Seoul Metropolitan Subway	Following station
Jinjeop Terminus	Line 4	ByeollaeByeolgaram towards Oido
Location

Onam Station is an underground station of the Seoul Subway Line 4 in Namyangju, Gyeonggi Province, South Korea.

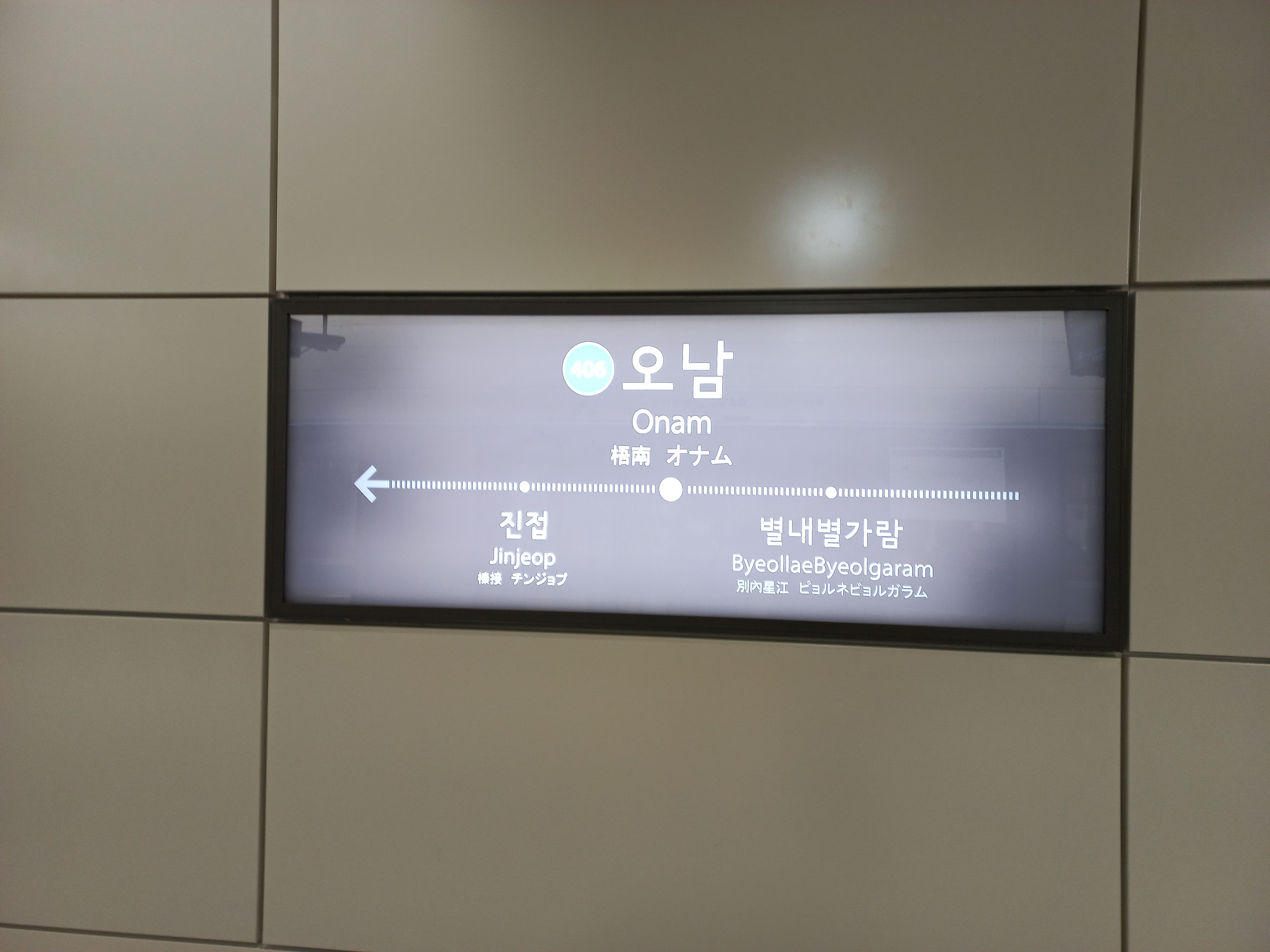

== Station layout ==
G	Street level	Exit

L1; Concourse	Lobby	Customer Service, Shops, Vending machines, ATMs

L2; Platforms	Side platform, doors will open on the right
L2; Platforms	Northbound	← Line 4 toward Jinjeop (Terminus)
L2; Platforms	Southbound	Line 4 toward Oido (ByeollaeByeolgaram) →
L2; Platforms	Side platform, doors will open on the right
