= Jeongwang-dong =

Neighborhood in Siheung, South Korea

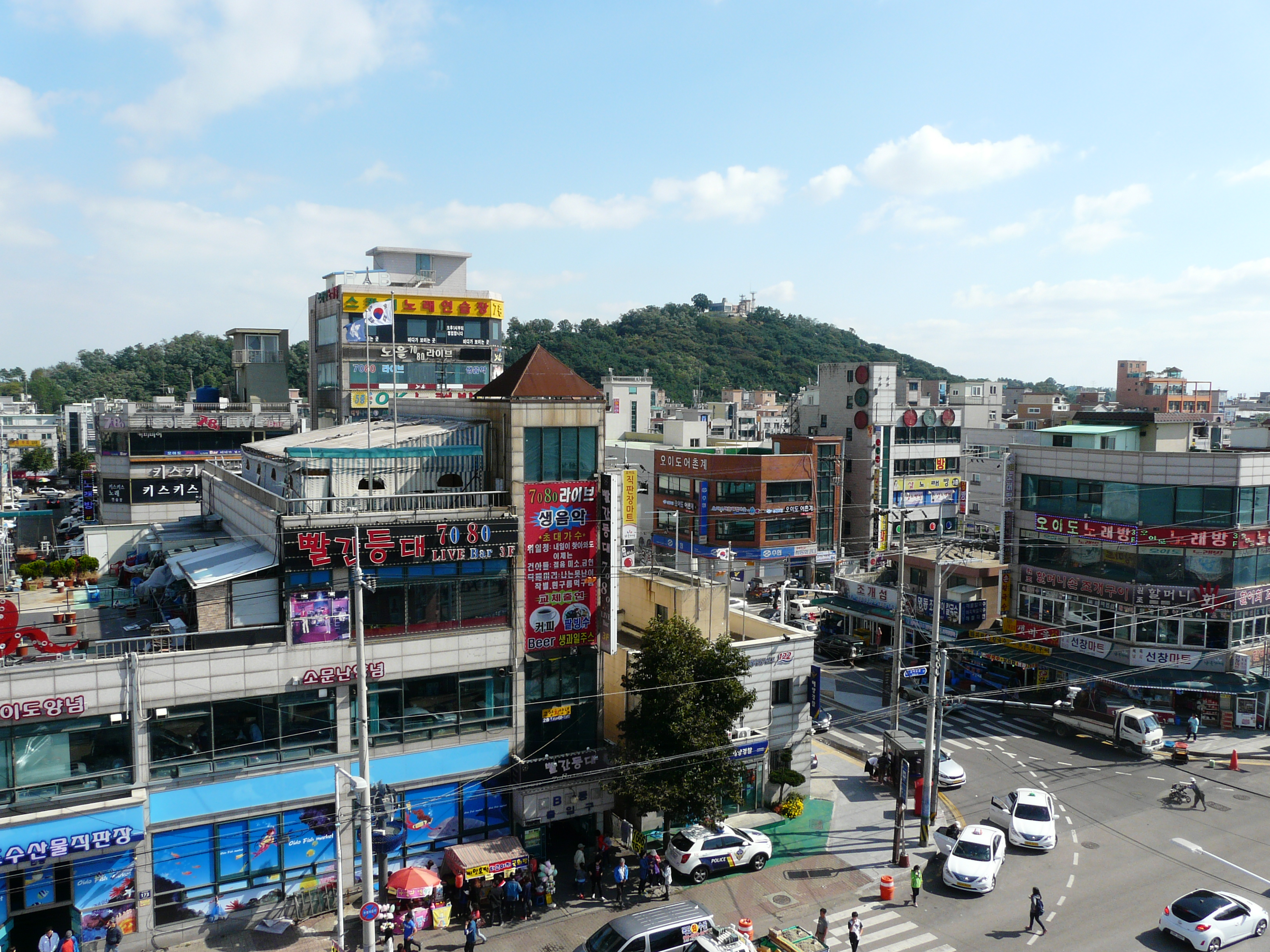
- Interactive map of Jeongwang-dong
- Country: South Korea
- Region: Gyeonggi Province

Area
  - Total: 32.91 km^{2} (12.71 sq mi)

Population (2017)
  - Total: 155,473
  - Density: 4,724/km^{2} (12,240/sq mi)
  - Dialect: Gyeonggi

Korean name
- Hangul: 정왕동
- Hanja: 正往洞
- RR: Jeongwang-dong
- MR: Chŏngwang-dong

Jeongwang-dong (Korean: 정왕동) is a dong situated in the city of Siheung, Gyeonggi-do, South Korea. The neighbourhood is divided into one main division; Jeongwang-dong and four subdivisions; Jeongwang 1-dong (정왕1동), Jeongwang 2-dong (정왕2동), Jeongwang 3-dong (정왕3동) and Jeongwang 4-dong (정왕4동). Together, these areas make up a total population of about 155,500 and an area of about 33 square kilometres.

== Development of Jeongwang-dong ==
January 1, 1989: Jeongwang-dong was established in Siheung, Korea.

September 27, 1999 : Jeongwang 1-dong is created from Jeongwang 1 and Jeongwang 2.

March 2, 2002: Jeongwang 2-dong is created from Jeongwang 2-dong, Jeongwang 3-dong, and Jeongwang 4-dong.

January 1, 2004: Jeongwang 3-dong is created from Jeongwangbon-dong and Jeongwang 1-dong.

October 8, 2018: Jeongwang 4-dong is established.

== See also ==
- Administrative divisions of South Korea
- List of cities and counties of Gyeonggi Province
- Jeongwang station
