= Buramsan station =

Metro station in Seoul, South Korea

Coordinates: 37°40′10.5″N 127°4′45.72″E

불암산; Buramsan
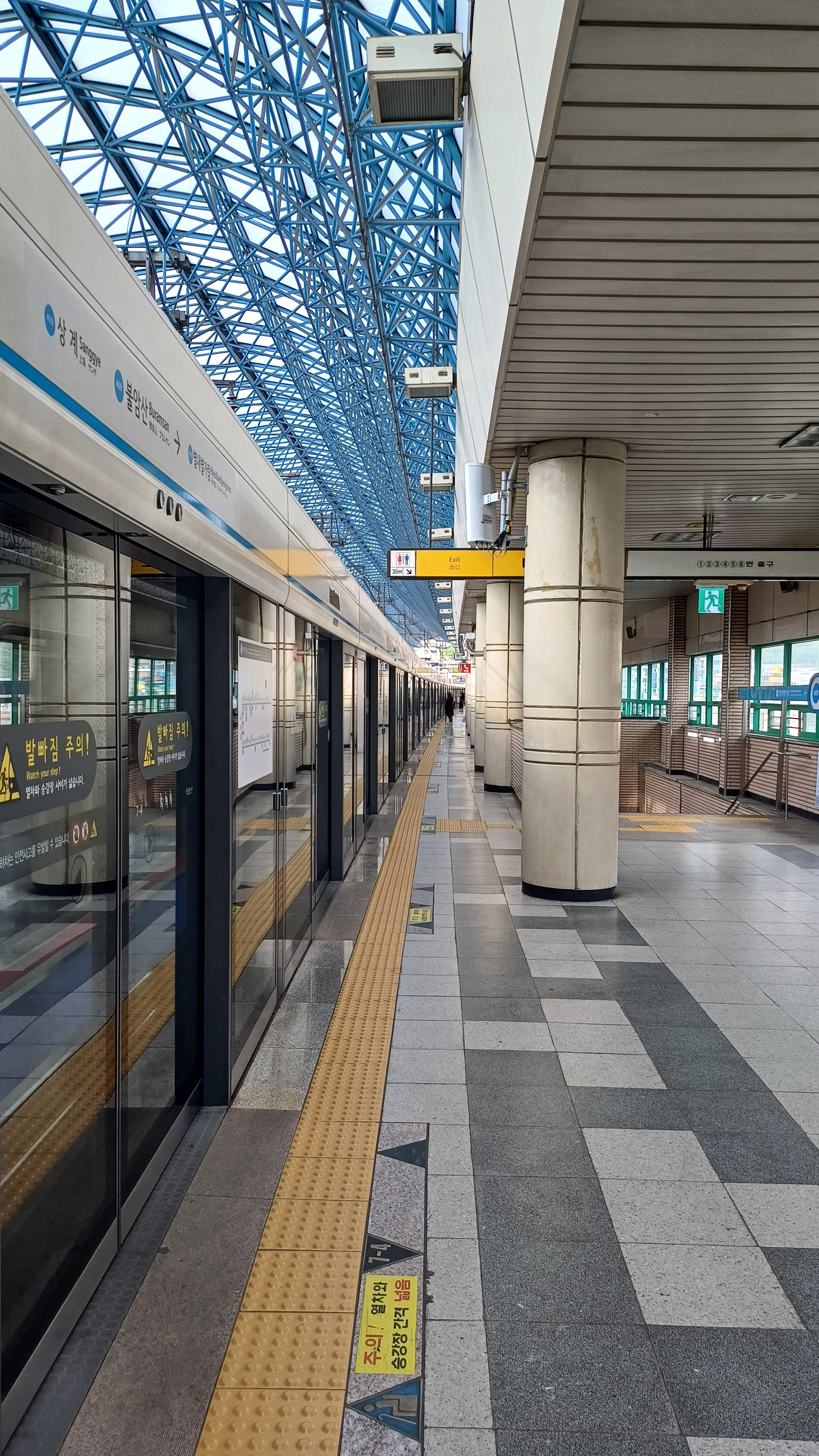
- Platform to Jinjeop

Korean name
- Hangul: 불암산역
- Hanja: 佛巖山驛
- Revised Romanization: Buramsan-yeok
- McCune–Reischauer: Puramsan-yŏk

General information
- Location: 305 Sanggye-ro, 111 Sanggye-dong, Nowon-gu, Seoul
- Operator: Seoul Metro
- Line: Line 4
- Platforms: 2 (2 side platforms)
- Tracks: 2

Construction
- Structure type: Elevated

History
- Opened: April 21, 1993

Passengers
- (Daily) Based on Jan-Dec of 2012. Line 4: 24,819

Services
Preceding station	Seoul Metropolitan Subway	Following station
ByeollaeByeolgaram towards Jinjeop	Line 4	Sanggye towards Oido
Location

Buramsan station (Korean: 불암산역) is a station on Line 4 of the Seoul Metropolitan Subway network. It was the northern terminus of Line 4, until 19 March 2022, when the line was extended to Jinjeop. It is an elevated station. The name of the subway station comes from its local name. The station was also known as Danggogae until 2024. Regional names refer to the pass that travelers carried over because of wild animals.

It is a three-story elevated station. The turnstile and station office are located on the second floor above ground, and the platform is located on the third floor above ground. There is a crossing line before entering this station. In the past, it was possible to cross the platform on the other side, but now the freight areas on both platforms are separated, so you cannot travel without going through the opening. There are five exits.

This station is located in Sanggye-dong, Nowon District, Seoul.

== Station layout ==
L2; Platforms	Side platform, doors will open on the right
L2; Platforms	Northbound	← Line 4 toward Jinjeop (ByeollaeByeolgaram)
L2; Platforms	Southbound	Line 4 toward Oido (Sanggye) →
L2; Platforms	Side platform, doors will open on the right

L1; Concourse	Lobby	Customer Service, Shops, Vending machines, ATMs

G	Street level	Exit

== Gallery ==
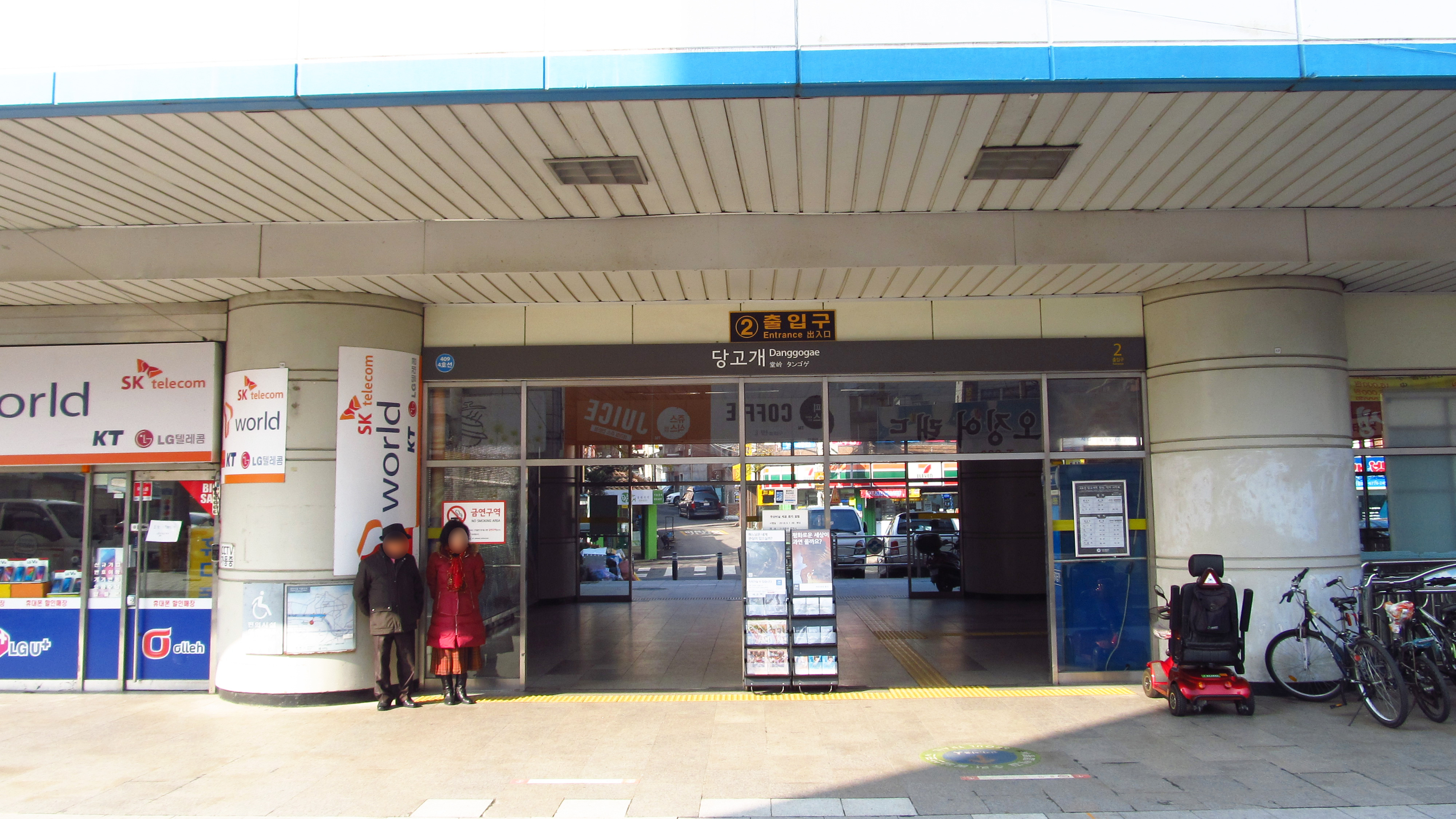
Exit 2

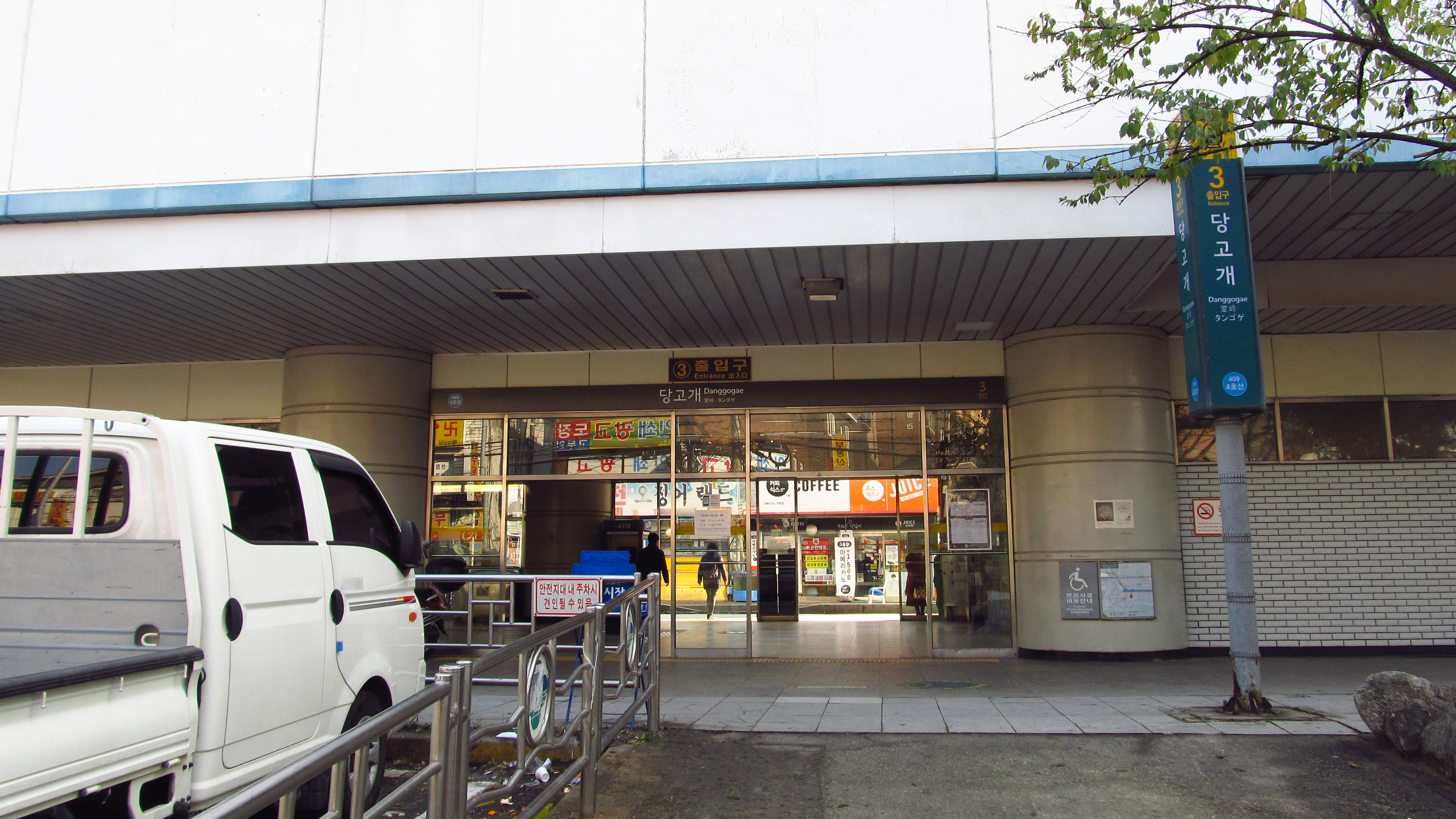
Exit 3

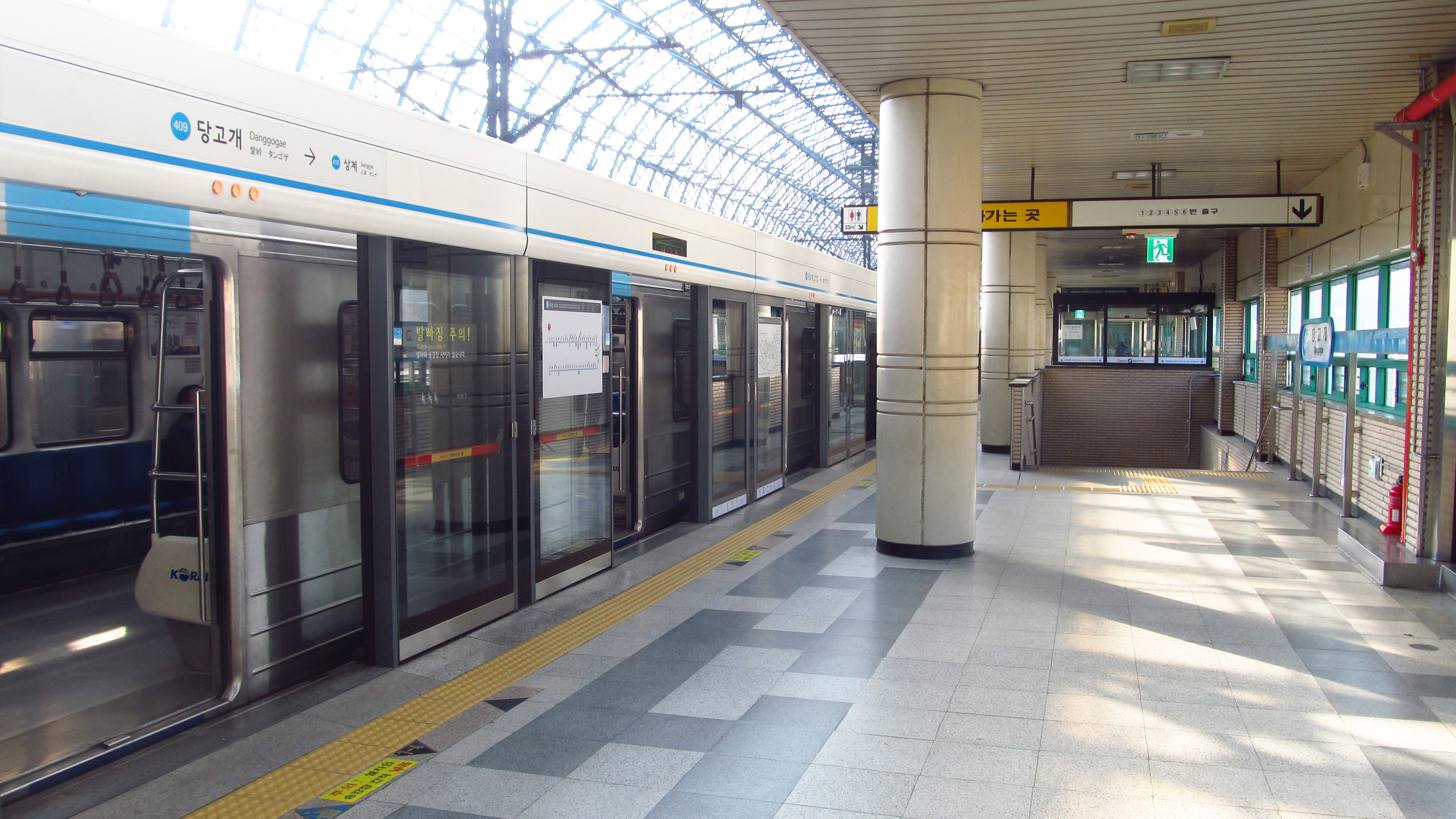
Platform to Oido

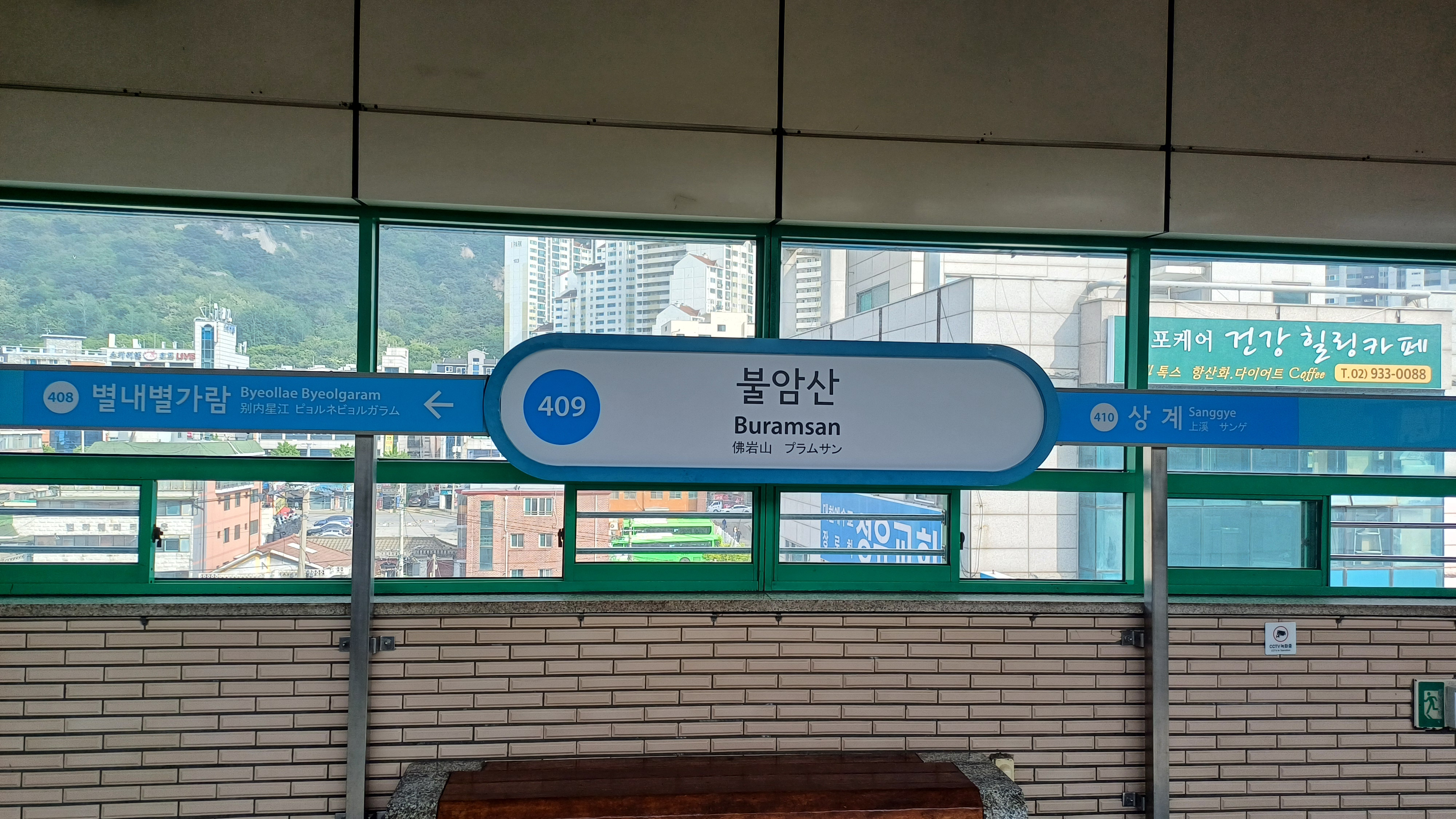
Station nameplate
