= List of cities and counties of Gyeonggi Province =

Gyeonggi Province (Gyeonggi-do) is divided into 28 cities (si) and 3 counties (gun). Listed below is each entity's name in English, hangul and hanja.

== Cities ==
- Suwon (수원시; 水原市, capital)
- Ansan (안산시; 安山市)
- Anseong (안성시; 安城市)
- Anyang (안양시; 安養市)
- Bucheon (부천시; 富川市)
- Dongducheon (동두천시; 東豆川市)
- Gimpo (김포시; 金浦市)
- Goyang (고양시; 高陽市)
- Gunpo (군포시; 軍浦市)
- Guri (구리시; 九里市)
- Gwacheon (과천시; 果川市)
- Gwangju (광주시; 廣州市)
- Gwangmyeong (광명시; 光明市)
- Hanam (하남시; 河南市)
- Hwaseong (화성시; 華城市)
- Icheon (이천시; 利川市)
- Namyangju (남양주시; 南楊州市)
- Osan (오산시; 烏山市)
- Paju (파주시; 坡州市)
- Pocheon (포천시; 抱川市)
- Pyeongtaek (평택시; 平澤市)
- Seongnam (성남시; 城南市)
- Siheung (시흥시; 始興市)
- Uijeongbu (의정부시; 議政府市)
- Uiwang (의왕시; 儀旺市)
- Yangju (양주시; 楊州市)
- Yeoju (여주시; 驪州市)
- Yongin (용인시; 龍仁市)

== Counties ==
- Gapyeong County (가평군; 加平郡)
- Yangpyeong County (양평군; 揚平郡)
- Yeoncheon County (연천군; 漣川郡)

== List by population and area ==
Name	Population	Area (km^{2})	Population Density (/km^{2})
Ansan	742,788	144.78	5,130.5
Anseong	167,511	553.46	302.7
Anyang	622,379	58.52	10,635.3
Bucheon	868,517	53.44	16,252.2
Dongducheon	93,718	95.66	979.7
Gimpo	232,364	276.64	840.0
Goyang	938,784	267.31	3,512.0
Gunpo	278,790	36.38	7,663.2
Guri	211,720	33.3	5,836.1
Gwacheon	72,088	35.81	2,013.1
Gwangju	242,559	430.69	563.2
Gwangmyeong	334,526	38.5	8,687.0
Hanam	139,414	93.07	1,497.9
Hwaseong	497,907	844	590.0
Icheon	196,230	461.20	425.5
Namyangju	551,395	458.44	1,202.8
Osan	166,809	42.76	3,905.1
Paju	341,203	672.42	507.4
Pocheon	159,490	826.38	193.0
Pyeongtaek	406,191	452.18	898.3
Seongnam	970,847	141.82	6,845.6
Siheung	417,037	166.6	2,503.2
Suwon	1,095,957	121.09	9,050.8
Uijeongbu	430,769	81.59	5,279.7
Uiwang	135,058	53.95	2,503.4
Yangju	179,923	310.34	579.8
Yeoju	107,121	607.79	176.2
Yongin	923,937	591.32	1,562.5
Gapyeong County	56,815	843.46	67.3
Yangpyeong County	92,529	877.08	105.5
Yeoncheon County	45,572	695.61	65.5

== General information ==
Municipal	Subdivisions	Image	Location
Ansan	Danwon District; Wa-dong; Gojan-dong; Hosu-dong; Wongok-dong; Choji-dong; Seonbu-dong; Daebu-dong; Sangnok District; Il-dong; I-dong; Sa-dong; Bono-dong; Bugok-dong; Wolpi-dong; Seongpo-dong; Banwol-dong; Ansan-dong		
Anseong	Anseong-dong; Gongdo-eup; Bogae-myeon; Geumgwang-myeon; Seoun-myeon; Miyang-myeon; Daedeok-myeon; Yangseong-myeon; Wongok-myeon; Iljuk-myeon; Juksan-myeon; Samjuk-myeon; Gosam-myeon		
Anyang	Dongan District; Bisan-dong; Buheung-dong; Dalan-dong; Gwanyang-dong; Burim-dong; Pyeongchon-dong; Pyeongan-dong; Gwiin-dong; Hogye-dong; Beomgye-dong; Sinchon-dong; Galsan-dong; Manan District; Anyang-dong; Seoksu-dong; Bakdal-dong		
Bucheon	Sosa-gu; Simgokbon-dong; Sosabon-dong; Beombak-dong; Gyesu-dong; Okgildong; Goeandong; Songnae-dong; Wonmi-gu; Simgok-dong; Wonmi-dong; Sosa-dong; Yeokgok-dong; Chunui-dong; Dodang-dong; Yakdae-dong; Jung-dong; Sang-dong; Ojeong-gu; Seonggok-dong; Wonjong-dong; Gogang-dong; Ojeong-dong; Sinheung-dong		
Dongducheon	Saengyeon-dong; Jungang-dong; Bosan-dong; Bulhyeon-dong; Songnae-dong; Soyo-dong; Sangpae-dong		
Gimpo	Gimpo-dong; Sau-dong; Pungmu-dong; Janggi-dong; Gurae-dong; Tongjin-eup; Gochon-eup; Yangchon-eup; Daegot-myeon; Wolgot-myeon; Haseong-myeon		
Goyang	Deogyang District; Jugyo-dong; Wonsin-dong; Heungdo-dong; Seongsa-dong; Hyoja-dong; Sindo-dong; Changneung-dong; Goyang-dong; Gwansan-dong; Neunggok-dong; Hwajeong-dong; Haengju-dong; Haengsin-dong; Hwajeon-dong; Daedoek-dong; Ilsandong District; Siksa-dong; Jungsan-dong; Jeongbalsan-Dong; Pungsan-dong; Baekseok-dong; Madu-dong; Janghang-dong; Gobong-dong; Ilsanseo District; lsan-dong; Tanhyeon-dong; Juyeop-dong; Daehwa-dong; Songpo-dong; Songsan-dong		
Gunpo	Gunpo-dong; Sanbon-dong; Geumjeong-dong; Jaegung-dong; Ogeum-dong; Suri-dong; Gungnae-dong; Gwangjeong-dong; Daeya-dong		
Guri	Galmae-dong; Donggu-dong; Inchang-dong; Gyomun-dong; Sutaek-dong		
Gwacheon	Jungang-dong; Galhyeon-dong; Burim-dong; Gwacheon-dong; Munwon-dong		
Gwangju	Gyeongan-dong; Songjeong-dong; Gyeongan-dong; Opo-eup; Choweol-eup; Gonjiam-eup; Docheok-myeon; Toechon-myeon; Namjong-myeon; Jungbu-myeon		
Gwangmyeong	Gwangmyeong-dong; Cheolsan-dong; Haan-dong; Soha-dong; Hakon-dong		
Hanam	Deokpung-dong; Sinjang-dong; Cheonhyeon-dong; Choi-dong; Gambuk-dong; Pungsan-dong; Gambuk-dong		
Hwaseong	Namyang-dong; Jinan-dong; Byeongjeom-dong; Banwol-dong; Gibae-dong; Hwasan-dong; Dongtan-dong; Bongdam-eup; Ujeong-dong; Hyangnam-dong; Maesong-myeon; Bibong-myeon; Mado-myeon; Songsan-myeon; Seosin-myeon; Paltan-myeon; Jangan-myeon; Yanggam-myeon; Jeongnam-myeon; Dongtan-myeon		
Icheon	Changjeon-dong; Jeungpo-dong; Jungri-dong; Gwango-dong; Janghowon-eup; Janghowon-eup; Sindun-myeon; Baeksa-myeon; Hobeop-myeon; Majang-myeon; Daewol-myeon; Moga-myeon; Seolseong-myeon; Yul-myeon		
Namyangju	Hopyeong-dong; Pyeongnae-dong; Geumgok-dong; Yangjeong-dong; Jigeum-dong; Donong-dong; Byeollae-dong; Hwado-eup; Wabu-eup; Jingun-eup; Jinjeop-eup; Onam-eup; Sudong-myeon; Byeollae-myeon; Joan-myeon; Toegyewon-myeon		
Osan	Jungang-dong; Daewon-dong; Daewon-dong; Sinjang-dong; Sema-dong; Chopyeong-dong		
Paju	Gyoha-dong; Unjeong-dong; Geumchon-dong; Munsan-eup; Jori-eup; Beobwon-eup; Paju-eup; Gwangtan-myeon; Tanhyun-Myeon; Wollong-myeon; Jeokseong-myeon; Papyeong-myeon; Gunnae-myeon; Jangdan-myeon; Jindong-myeon; Jinseo-myeon		
Pocheon	Pocheon-dong; Seondan-dong; Soheul-eup; Gunnae-myeon; Naechon-myeon; Gasan-myeon; Sinbuk-myeon; Changsu-myeon; Yeongjung-myeon; Ildong-myeon; Idong-myeon; Yeongbuk-myeon; Gwanin-myeon; Hwajyeon-myeon		
Pyeongtaek	Jungang-dong; Seojeong-dong; Songtan-dong; Jisan-dong; Songbuk-dong; Sinjang-dong; Sinpyeong-dong; Wonpyeong-dong; Tongbok-dong; Bijeon-dong; Segyo-dong; Anjung-eup; Paengseong-eup; Poseung-eup; Jinwi-myeon; Seotan-myeon; Godeok-myeon; Oseong-myeon; Cheongbuk-myeon; Hyeondeok-myeon		
Seongnam	Bundang District; Bundang-dong; Sunae-dong; Jeongja-dong; Seohyeon-dong; Imae-dong; Yatap-dong; Geumgok-dong; Gumi-dong; Pangyo-dong; Sampyeong-dong; Baekhyeon-dong; Unjung-dong; Jungwon District; Seongnam-dong; Jungang-dong; Geumgwang-dong; Eunhang-dong; Sangdaewon-dong; Hadaewon-dong; Dochon-dong; Sujeong District; Sinheung-dong; Taepyeong-dong; Sujin-dong; Dandae-dong; Sanseong-dong; Yangji-dong; Bokjeong-dong; Sinchon-dong; Godeung-dong; Siheung-dong		
Siheung	Daeya-dong; Sincheon-dong; Sinhyeon-dong; Eunhaeng-dong; Maehwa-dong; Mokgam-dong; Gunja-dong; Jeongwang-dong; Gwarim-dong; Yeonseong-dong; Neunggok-dong		
Suwon	Gwonseon District; Seryu-dong; Pyeong-dong; Seodun-dong; Guun-dong; Geumho-dong; Gwonseon-dong; Gokseon-dong; Ipbuk-dong; Jangan District; Pajang-dong; Yuljeon-dong; Jeongja-dong; Yeonghwa-dong; Songjuk-dong; Jowon-dong; Yeonmu-dong; Paldal District; Haenggung-dong; Maegyo-dong; Maesan-dong; Godeung-dong; Hwaseo-dong; Ji-dong; Uman-dong; Ingye-dong; Yeongtong District; Maetan-dong; Woncheon-dong; Gwanggyo-dong; Yeongtong-dong; Taejang-dong		
Uijeongbu	Uijeongbu-dong; Howon-dong; Jangam-dong; Singok-dong; Songsan-dong; Jageum-dong; Ganeung-dong; Nogyang-dong		
Uiwang	Gocheon-dong; Bugok-dong; Ojeon-dong; Naeson-dong; Cheonggye-dong		
Yangju	Yangju-dong; Hoecheon-dong; Baekseok-eup; Eunhyeon-myeon; Nam-myeon; Gwangjeok-myeon; Jangheung-myeon		
Yeoju	Yeoheung-dong; Jungang-dong; Ohak-dong; Ganam-eup; Jeomdong-myeon; Neungseo-myeon; Heungcheon-myeon; Geumsa-myeon; Sanbuk-myeon; Daesin-myeon; Bungnae-myeon; Gangcheon-myeon		
Yongin	Cheoin District; Jungang-dong; Yeoksam-dong; Yurim-dong; Dongbu-dong; Pogok-eup; Mohyeon-eup; Namsa-myeon; Idong-myeon; Wonsam-myeon; Baegam-myeon; Yangji-myeon; Giheung District; Singal-dong; Yeongdeok-dong; Gugal-dong; Sanggal-dong; Giheung-dong; Seonong-dong; Guseong-dong; Mabuk-dong; Dongbaek-dong; Sangha-dong; Bojeong-dong; Suji District; Pungdeokcheon-dong; Sinbong-dong; Jukjeon-dong; Dongcheon-dong; Sanghyeon-dong; Seongbok-dong		
Gapyeong County	Gapyeong-eup; Seorak-myeon; Cheongpyeong-myeon; Sang-myeon; Ha-myeon; Buk-myeon		
Yangpyeong County	Yangpyeong-eup; Gangsang-myeon; Gangha-myeon; Yangseo-myeon; Okcheon-myeon; Seojong-myeon; Danwol-myeon; Cheongun-myeon; Yangdong-myeon; Jipyeong-myeon; Yongmun-myeon; Gaegun-myeon		
Yeoncheon County	Yeoncheon-eup; Jeongok-eup; Gunnamn-myeon; Cheongsan-myeon; Baekhak-myeon; Misan-myeon; Wangjing-myeon; Sinseo-myeon; Jung-myeon; Jangnam-myeon		

== See also ==
- List of cities in South Korea
