= Oido station =

Seoul Subway station in South Korea

Coordinates: 37.3689354°N 126.7360751°E

오이도; Oido
오이도; Oido
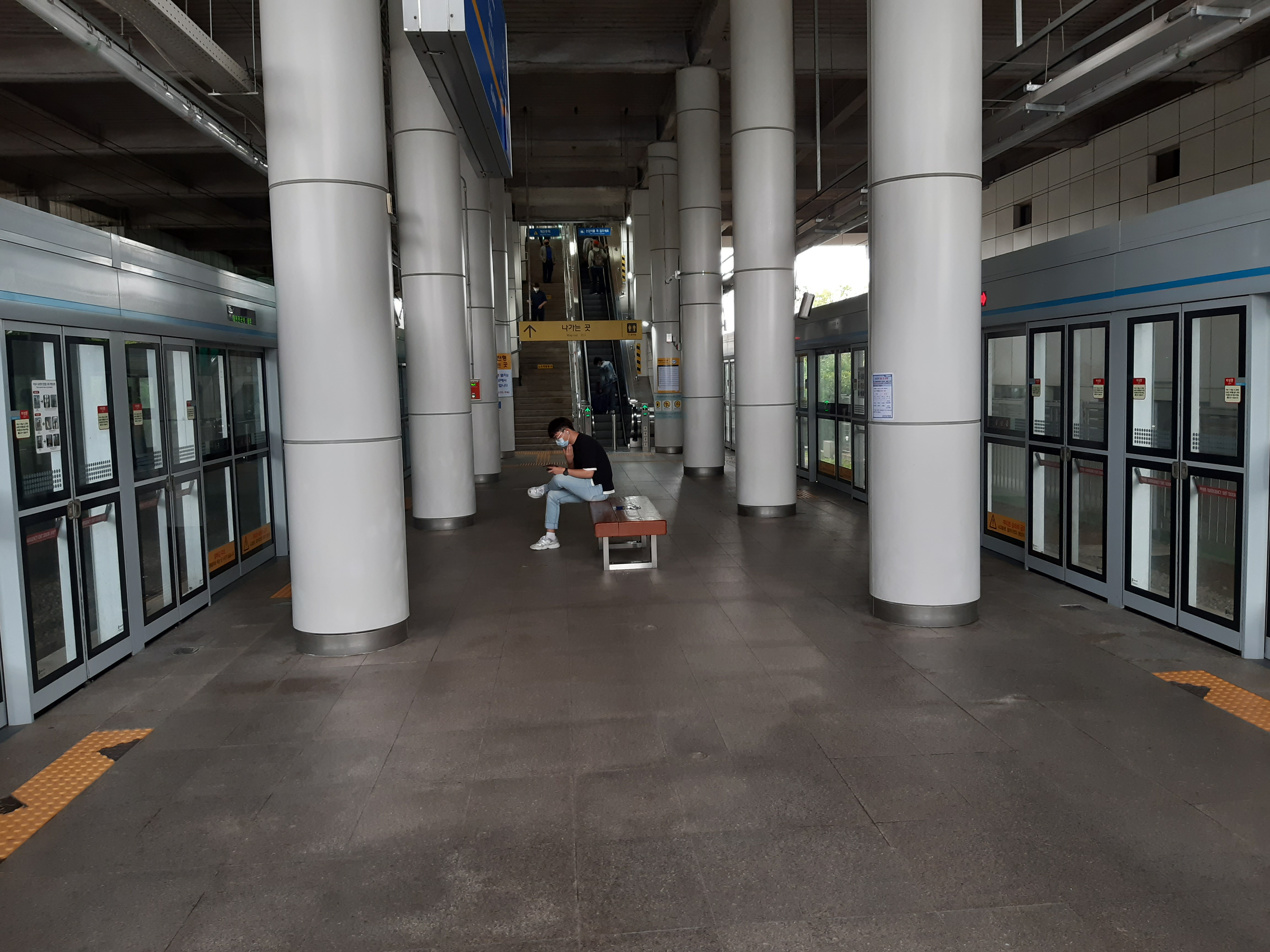
- Line 4 platforms

Korean name
- Hangul: 오이도역
- Hanja: 烏耳島驛
- Revised Romanization: Oido-yeok
- McCune–Reischauer: Oido-yŏk

General information
- Location: 878 Jeongwang-dong, 430 Yeokjeonno, Siheung-si, Gyeonggi-do
- Operator: Korail
- Lines: Line 4 Suin–Bundang Line
- Platforms: 2
- Tracks: 4

Construction
- Structure type: Aboveground

Key dates
- July 28, 2000: Line 4 opened
- June 30, 2012: Suin–Bundang Line opened
Services
Preceding station	Seoul Metropolitan Subway	Following station
Jeongwang towards Jinjeop	Line 4 Local	Terminus
Jeongwang towards Buramsan	Line 4 Express	Terminus
Jeongwang towards Cheongnyangni	Suin–Bundang Line	Darwol towards Incheon
Terminus	Suin–Bundang Line Suin Express Line	Soraepogu towards Incheon
Location

Oido station (Korean: 오이도역) is a subway station on Seoul Subway Line 4 and the Suin–Bundang Line in Siheung, South Korea. It is the current southwestern terminus of Seoul Subway Line 4 located almost 30 kilometers southwest of Seoul, connecting Oido to other parts of Korea. A commuter rail trip between this station and Seoul Station takes over an hour, and a train servicing depot is located nearby. The name of the station was decided by the surrounding area Oido island.

This station, along with Jeongwang station to the southeast, serves the Sihwa Industrial District of southwestern Siheung.

Beginning in June 2012, this station also became the southeastern terminus of the Suin Line, linking the city of Siheung to southern Incheon. The Suin Line was later connected to the Bundang Line, allowing for service directly into Seoul, combining the two lines as the Suin–Bundang Line. Trains on Seoul Subway line 4 and the Suin–Bundang Line share tracks and platforms through this station as well as along a significant portion of the Ansan Line; trains on Line 4 end service here.

Of the 4000 trains of the Seoul Metro that run between Jinjeop and Oido, 450 to 473 & 481 to 485 trains and the 341000 trains of the Korea Railroad Corporation will end at the station.

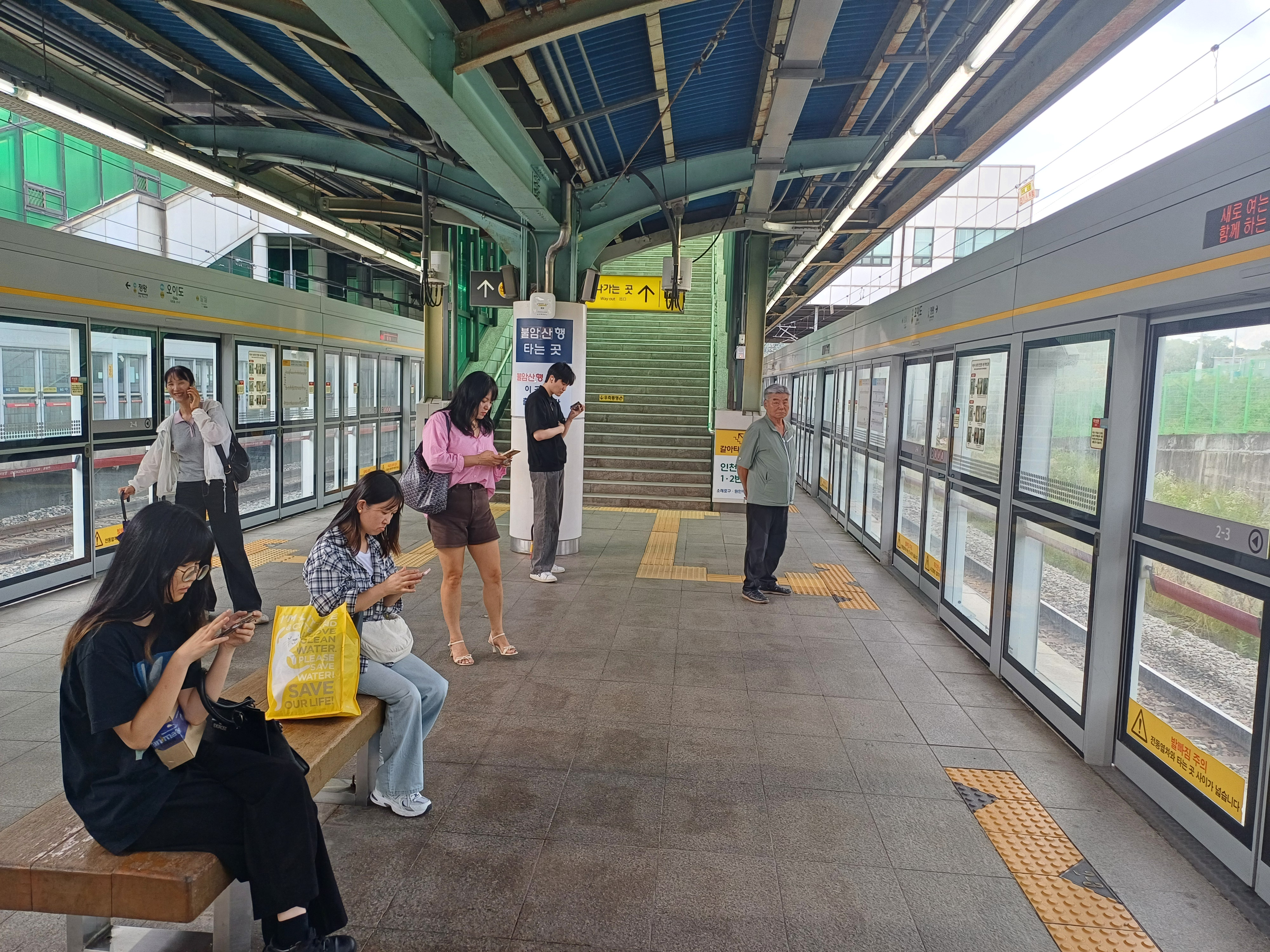
Suin-Bundang Line platforms

== Structure ==
It is equipped with a two-sided, four-sided, double-decker platform. Same as Sanggi Station and Wangsimni Station, both routes use two one-sided two-line platform. The No. 3 and No. 4 platforms were used as the departure platforms for Metropolitan Subway Line 4 prior to the opening of the Suin Line, but they were changed to the commissioning and forklifts on June 1, 2012.

From September 1, 2013, it is possible to make a plane connection only from 10:00 am to 5:00 pm, but in other times, it is necessary to transfer through the waiting room using the stairs in the existing way Currently, the transit of planes has been abolished since September 1, 2016 due to the change of train schedule of Line 4 and the additional train service. The installation of the platform screen door has been completed.

== Vicinity ==
- Exit 1: Sihwa District
- Exit 2: Hamhyeon Middle & High Schools
- Exit 3: North Town square (Opened at 5:00 AM, Closed at 11:30 PM.)

== Ridership ==
Station	Number of passengers						
Station	2000	2001	2002	2003	2004	2005	2006
Line 4	2691	3909	4552	5187	4536	4660	4849

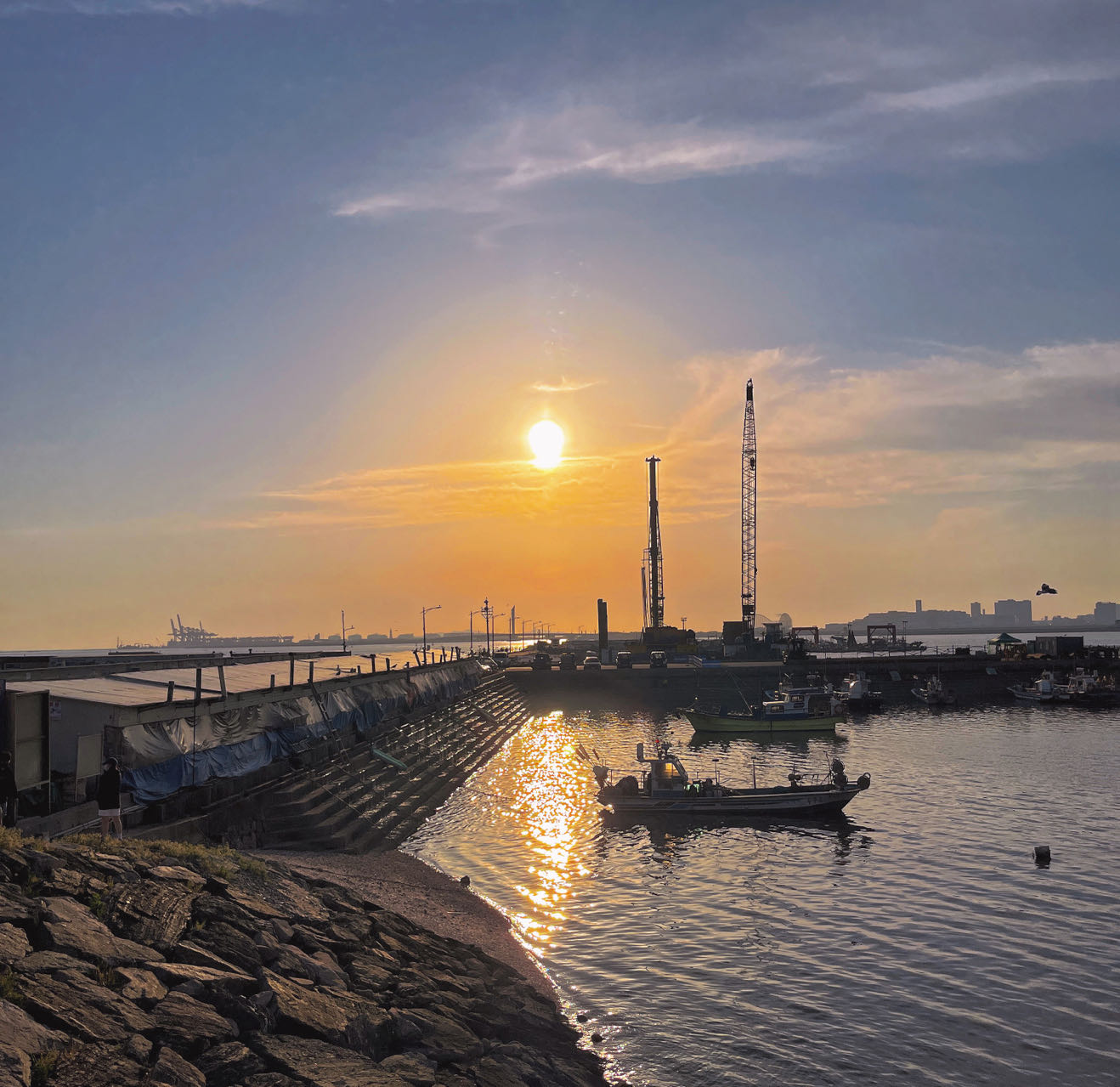
sunset in Oido

== Suin Line and future plans ==
The narrow-gauge Suin Line, which served as a means of transporting freight between Suwon and Incheon, was abandoned in 1995. Oido Station is the northwestern terminus of the section of the Suin Line that is still in use today; the southeastern terminus is Hanyang University at Ansan Station.

However, with the recent population boom in southern Gyeonggi province, the line was relaid as a standard gauge railroad for commuter rail. The commuter rail was opened over the course of a few stages. The first stage incorporates an extension of the Suin Line into southern Incheon, and will transfer with the Incheon Subway Line 1 at Woninjae Station.
