= Jinjeop station =

Underground train station in Namyangju, South Korea

진접 (경복대); Jinjeop (Kyungbok University)
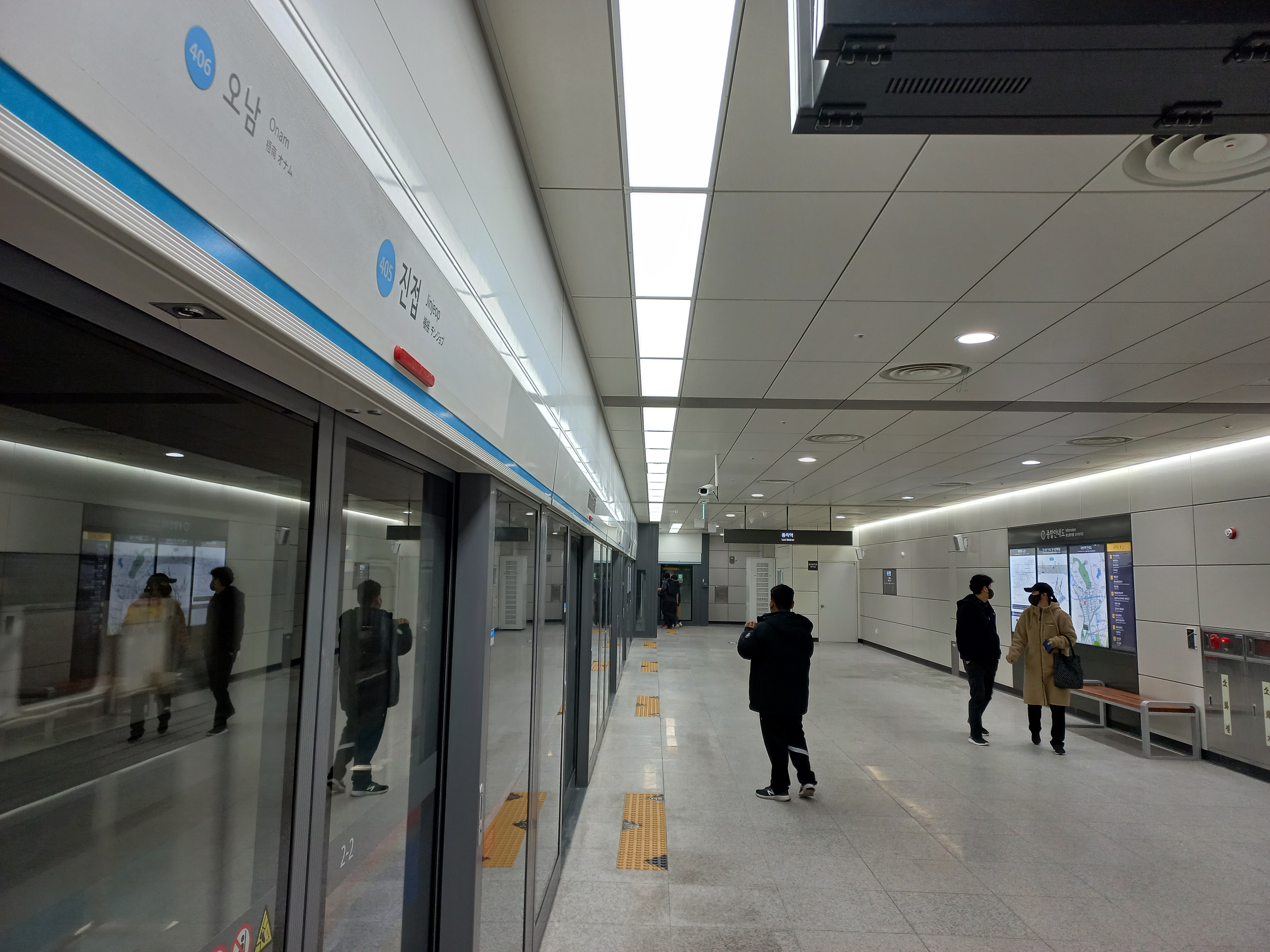

Korean name
- Hangul: 진접역
- Hanja: 榛接驛
- RR: Jinjeop-yeok
- MR: Chinjŏp-yŏk

General information
- Location: Jinjeop-eup, Namyangju-si, Gyeonggi-do
- Coordinates: 37.7199°N 127.2032°E
- Operator: Namyangju City Urban Corporation
- Line: Line 4
- Platforms: 2 (2 side platforms)
- Tracks: 2

Construction
- Structure type: Underground

History
- Opened: March 19, 2022

Services
Preceding station	Seoul Metropolitan Subway	Following station
Terminus	Line 4	Onam towards Oido
Location

Jinjeop station is an underground station and terminus station of the Seoul Subway Line 4 in Namyangju, Gyeonggi Province, South Korea.

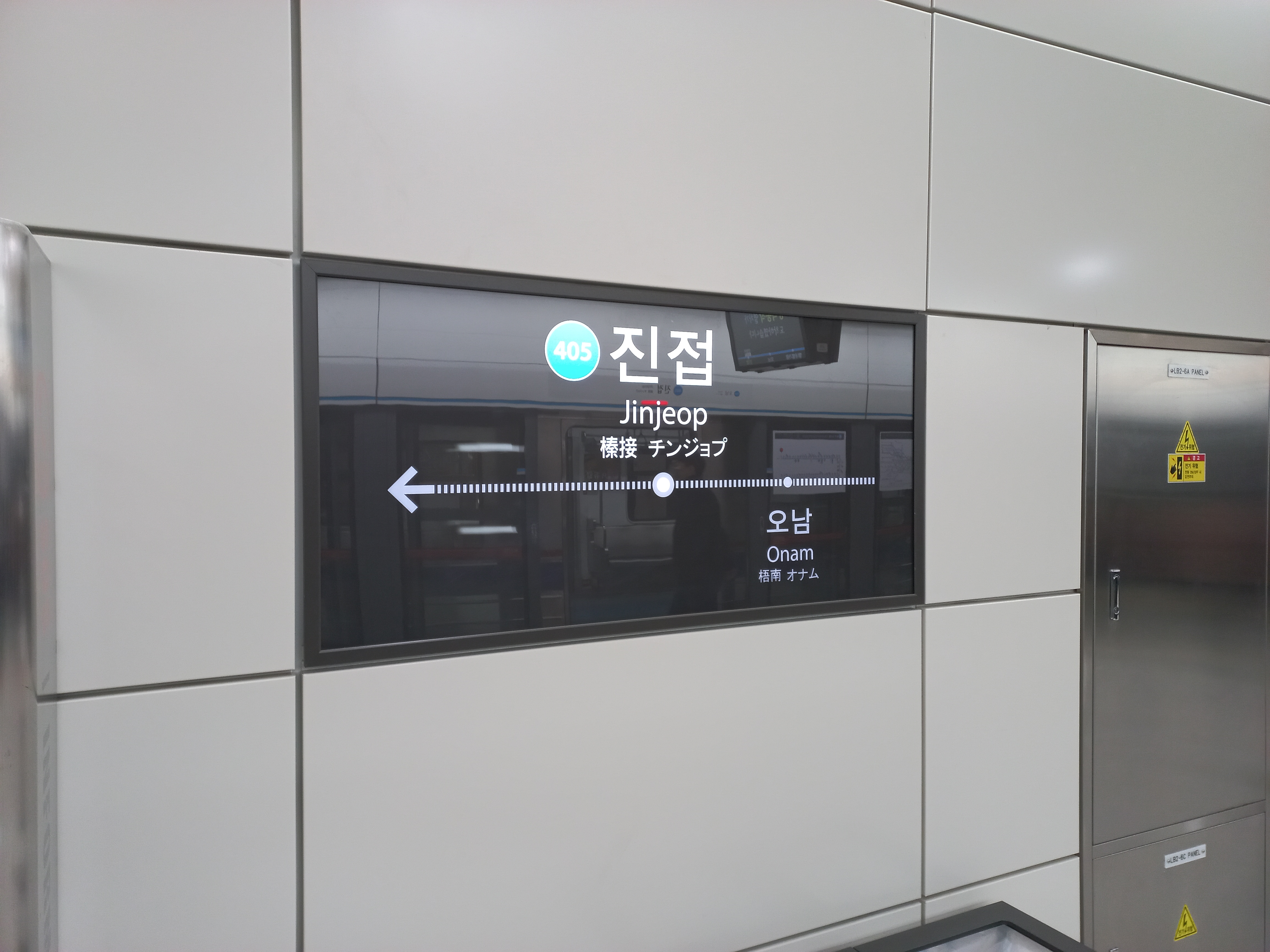

== Station layout ==
G	Street level	Exit

L1; Concourse	Lobby	Customer Service, Shops, Vending machines, ATMs

L2; Platforms	Side platform, doors will open on the right
L2; Platforms	Northbound	← Line 4 Alighting Passengers Only
L2; Platforms	Southbound	Line 4 toward Oido (Onam) →
L2; Platforms	Side platform, doors will open on the right
