= Hangangjin station =

Seoul Subway Line 6 station

Coordinates: 37°32′22″N 127°00′06″E

한강진; Hangangjin
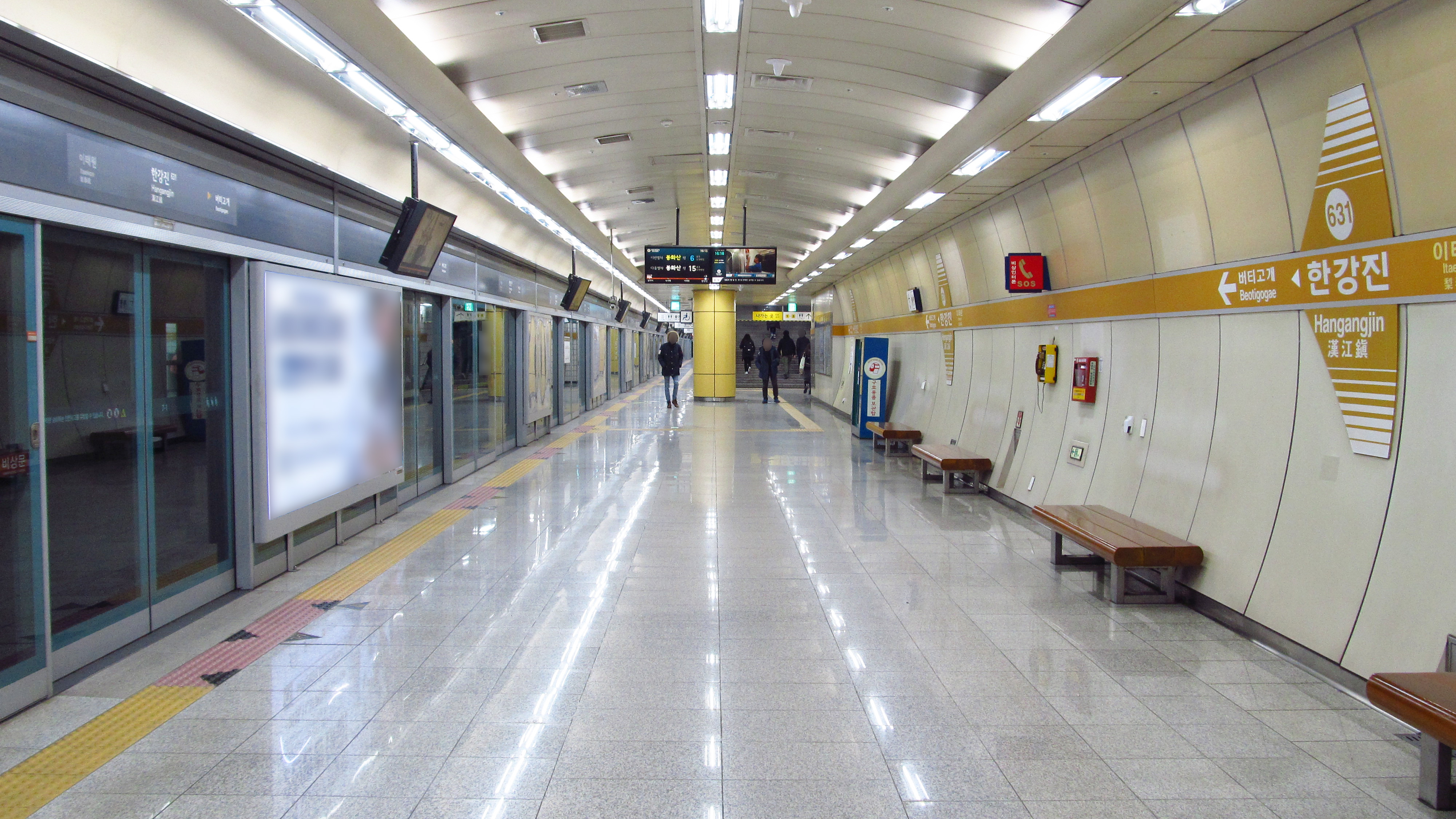

Korean name
- Hangul: 한강진역
- Hanja: 漢江鎭驛
- Revised Romanization: Hangangjin-yeok
- McCune–Reischauer: Hangangjin-yŏk

General information
- Location: 10-33 Hannam-dong, 287 Itaewonno Jiha, Yongsan-gu, Seoul
- Operated by: Seoul Metro
- Line(s): Line 6
- Platforms: 2
- Tracks: 2

Construction
- Structure type: Underground

Key dates
- March 9, 2001: Line 6 opened

Hangangjin station is a subway station on the Seoul Subway Line 6. Operated by Seoul Metro, this station serves as a vital transportation hub, connecting commuters to major attractions, commercial areas, and residential neighborhoods.

== Station layout ==
G	Street level	Exit

L1; Concourse	Lobby	Customer Service, Shops, Vending machines, ATMs

L2; Platform level	Side platform, doors will open on the right
L2; Platform level	Westbound	← Line 6 toward Eungam (Itaewon)
L2; Platform level	Eastbound	Line 6 toward Sinnae (Beotigogae) →
L2; Platform level	Side platform, doors will open on the right

== Vicinity ==
- Exit 1 : Yongsan International School of Seoul, Grand Hyatt Seoul, Norwegian Embassy of Seoul,
- Exit 2 : Bukhannam samgeori (3-way intersection)
- Exit 3 : Hannam Foreigners APT

Preceding station	Seoul Metropolitan Subway	Following station
Itaewon towards Eungam	Line 6	Beotigogae towards Sinnae
