= Beotigogae station =

Station of the Seoul Metropolitan Subway

Coordinates: 37°32′52″N 127°00′23″E

버티고개; Beotigogae
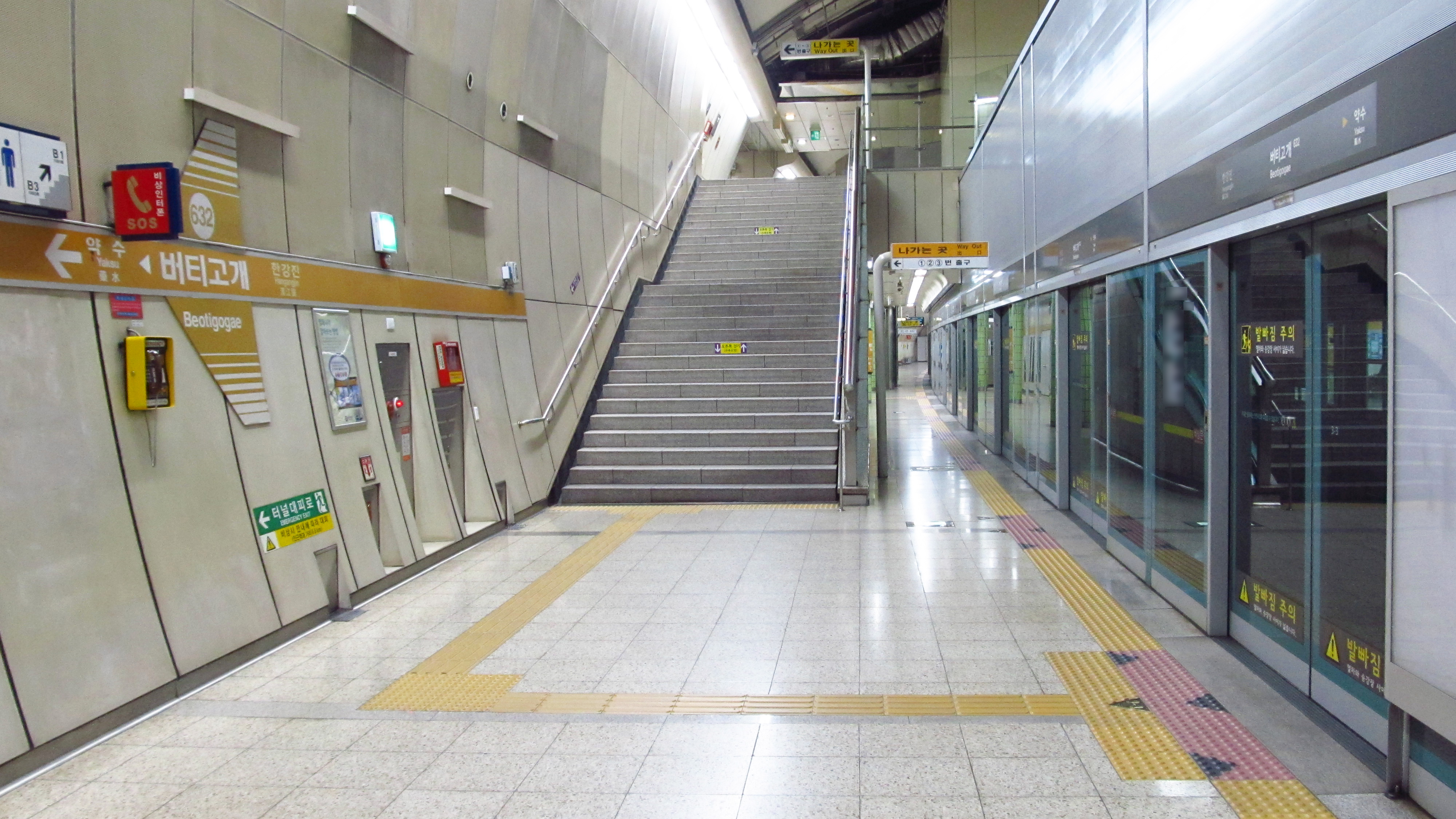

Korean name
- Hangul: 버티고개역
- Hanja: 버티고개驛
- Revised Romanization: Beotigogae-yeok
- McCune–Reischauer: Pŏt'igogae-yŏk

General information
- Location: 43 Dongho-ro 15-gil, 432 Sindang 2-dong, Jung-gu, Seoul
- Operator: Seoul Metro
- Line: Line 6
- Platforms: 2
- Tracks: 2

Construction
- Structure type: Underground

Key dates
- March 9, 2001: Line 6 opened
Location

Beotigogae Station is a subway station on the Seoul Subway Line 6 in Jung-gu. This station was built deep underground because this area is located near Namsan and is quite hilly.

The station's name comes from the nearby Beoti Pass, which according to legend got its name after soldiers chasing a thief through the pass from Hannam-dong to Yaksu-dong in the Joseon period, shouting "beondo" (번도, 番盜, thief), and the word beondo later became beonti and then beoti.

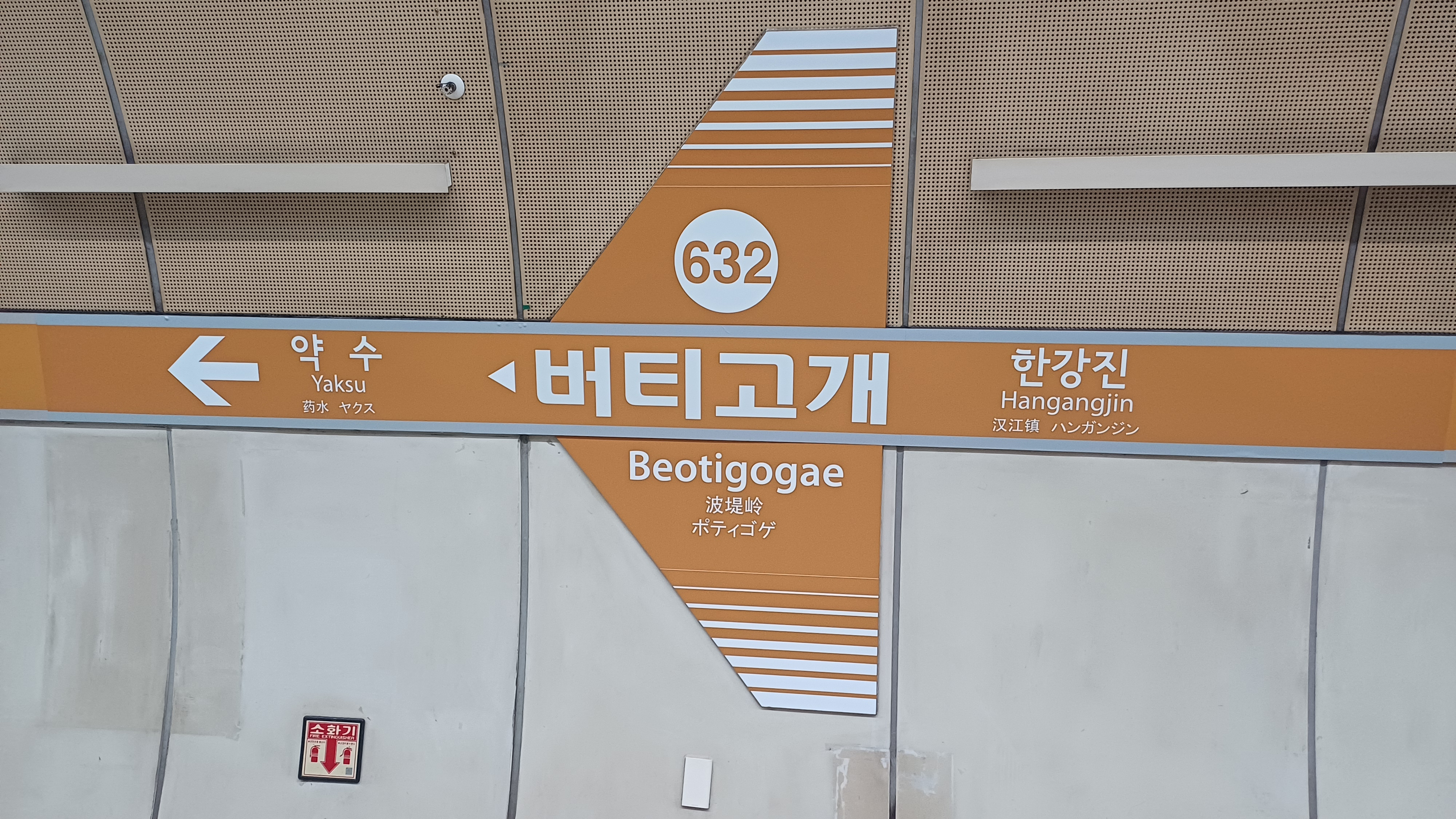
Station nameplate

== Station layout ==
G	Street level	Exit

L1; Concourse	Lobby	Customer Service, Shops, Vending machines, ATMs

L2; Platform level	Side platform, doors will open on the right
L2; Platform level	Westbound	← Line 6 toward Eungam (Hangangjin)
L2; Platform level	Eastbound	Line 6 toward Sinnae (Yaksu) →
L2; Platform level	Side platform, doors will open on the right

== Vicinity ==
- Exit 1 : Yaksu Police Station, Tower Hotel
- Exit 2 : Songdo Hospital
- Exit 3 : Namsan Town APT

== Gallery ==
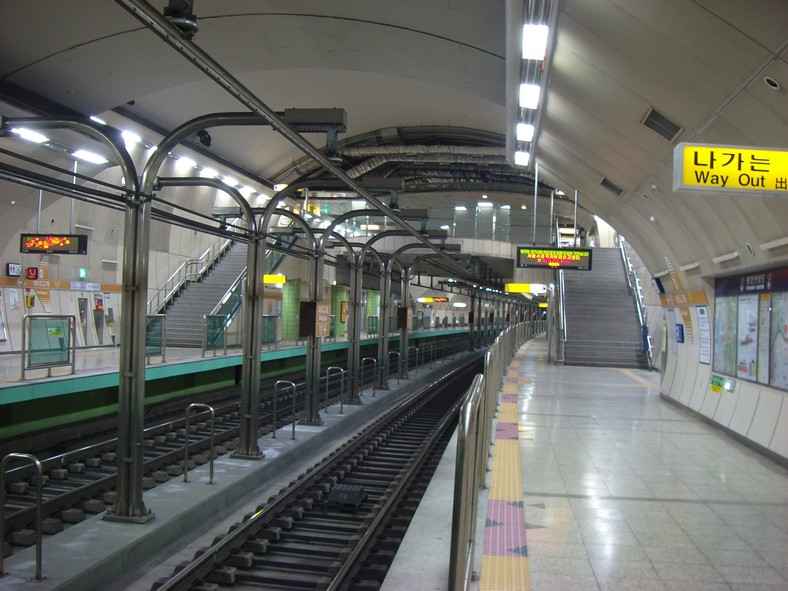
Beotigogae station platform before installation of platform screen doors, 2007

Preceding station	Seoul Metropolitan Subway	Following station
Hangangjin towards Eungam	Line 6	Yaksu towards Sinnae
