= Yaksu-dong =

Neighbourhood in Seoul, South Korea

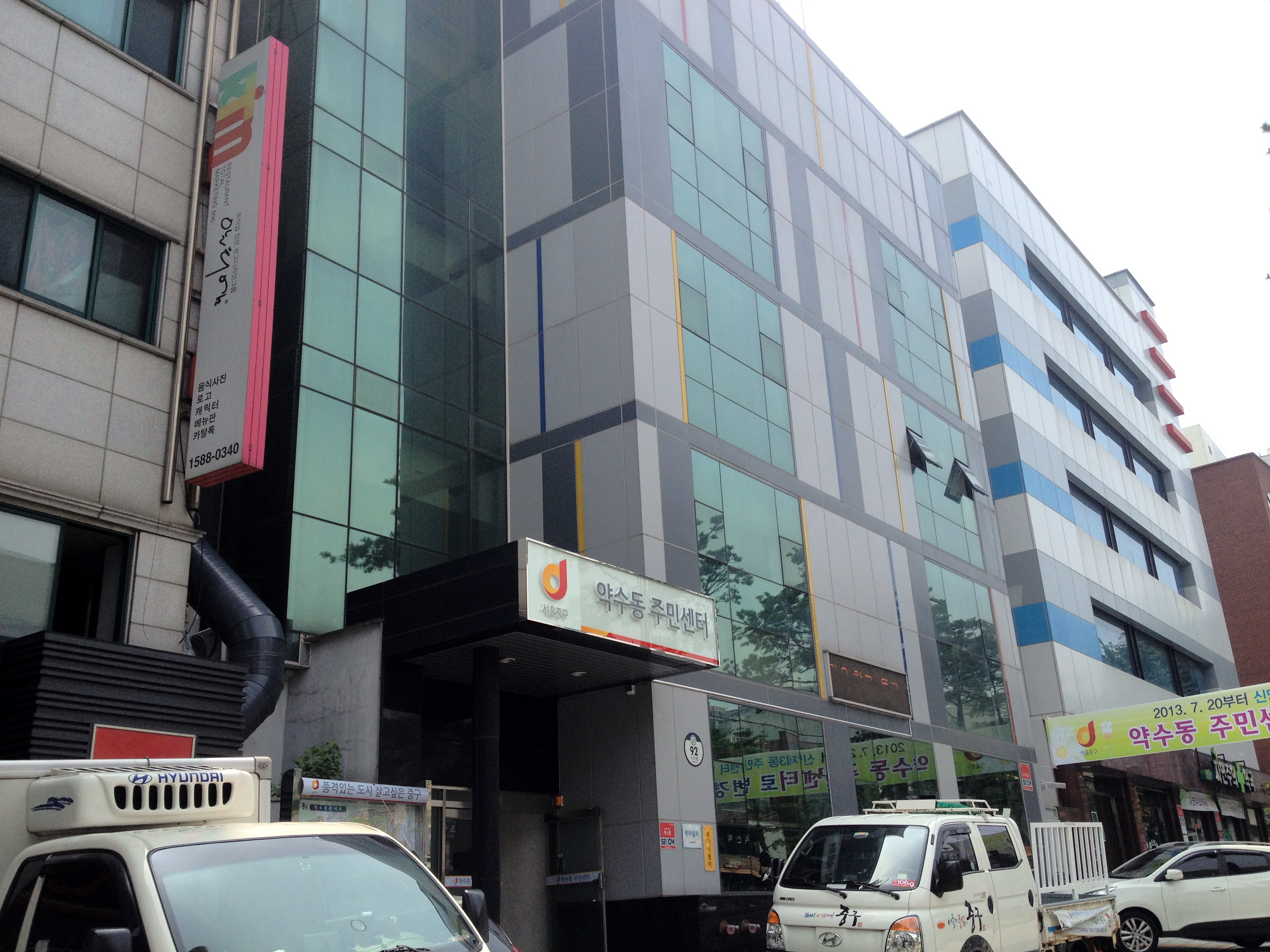
- Yaksu-dong Resident Office

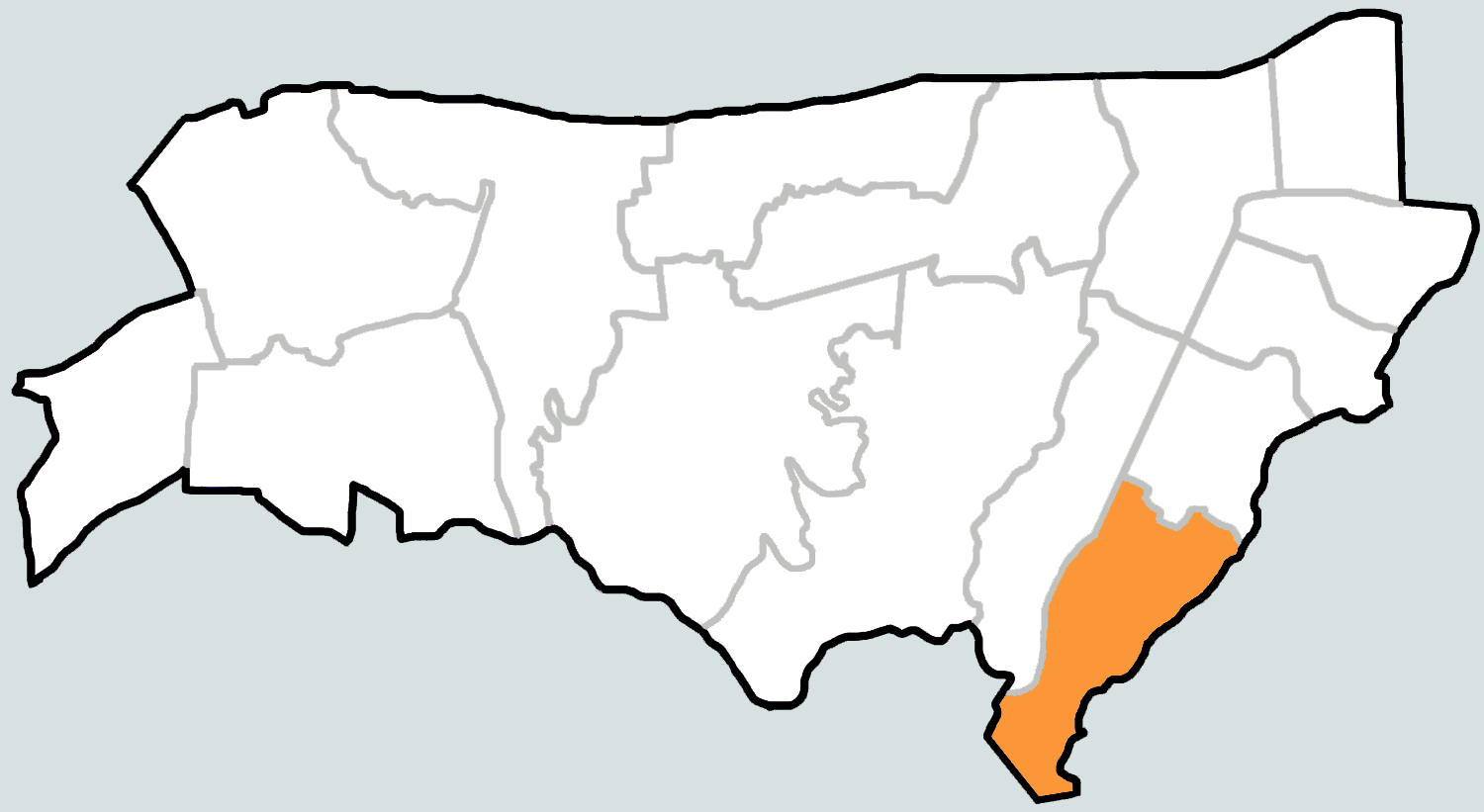
- Yaksu-dong within Jung-gu
- Country: South Korea

Area
  - Total: 0.48 km^{2} (0.19 sq mi)

Population (2013)
  - Total: 19,139
  - Density: 40,000/km^{2} (100,000/sq mi)

Korean name
- Hangul: 약수동
- Hanja: 藥水洞
- RR: Yaksu-dong
- MR: Yaksu-dong

Yaksu-dong (Korean: 약수동) is a dong (neighbourhood) of Jung District, Seoul, South Korea.

Yaksu-dong is an administrative dong located at the southeast end of Jung-gu. The area is elongated from north to south, with Dong-gu to the east and Yongsan-gu to the south. Furthermore, it borders Chayang-dong within the same district to the west, and Seo-gu to the north.

== Transportation ==
- Yaksu Station of and of
- Beotigogae Station of

== See also ==
- Administrative divisions of South Korea
