= Itaewon station =

Train station in Seoul, South Korea

이태원; Itaewon
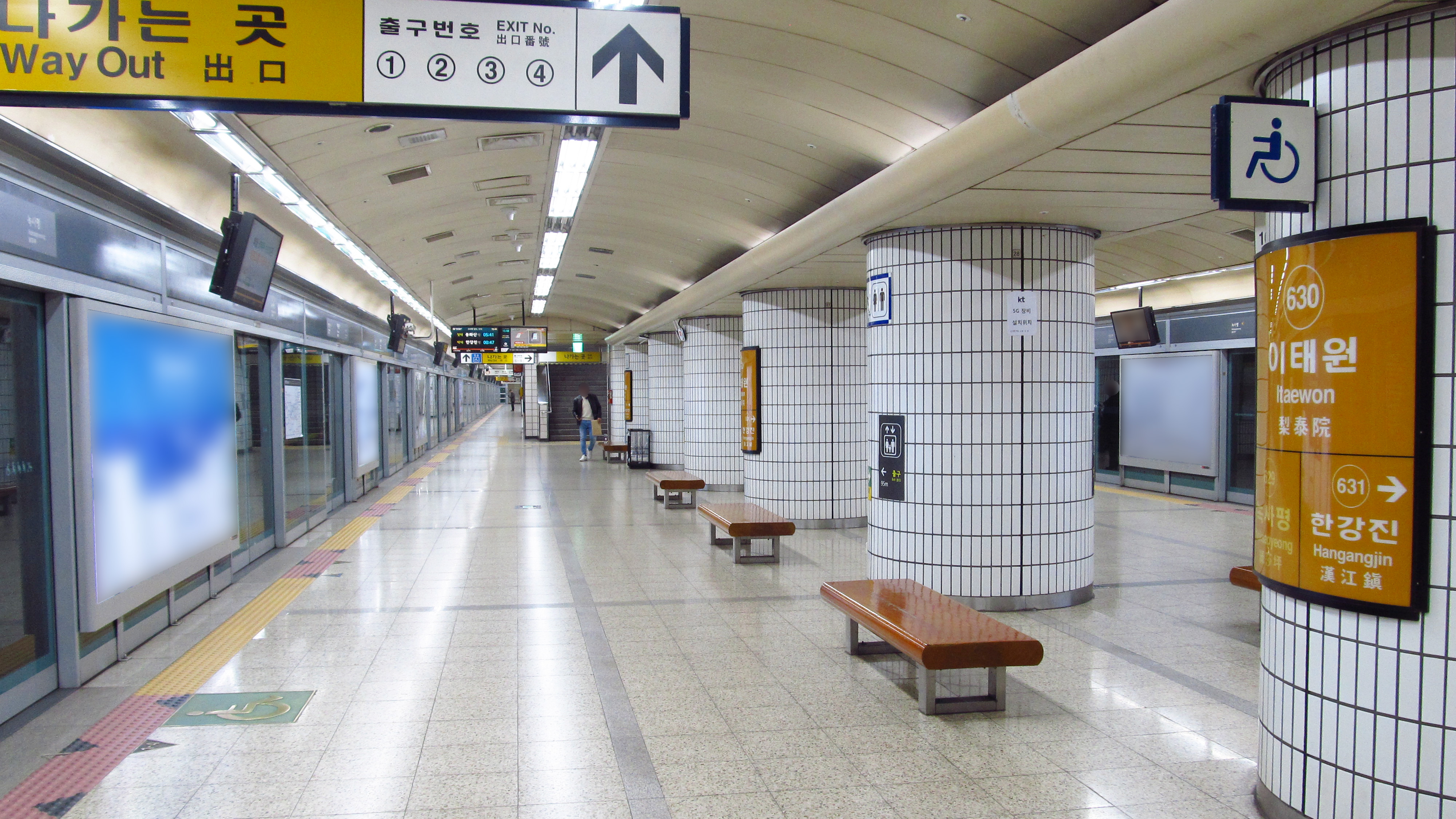
- Station Platform

Korean name
- Hangul: 이태원역
- Hanja: 梨泰院驛
- Revised Romanization: Itaewon-yeok
- McCune–Reischauer: It'aewon-yŏk

General information
- Location: 127 Itaewon-dong, 177 Itaewonno Jiha, Yongsan-gu, Seoul
- Coordinates: 37.5345°N 126.9944°E
- Operator: Seoul Metro
- Line: Line 6
- Platforms: 1
- Tracks: 2

Construction
- Structure type: Underground

Key dates
- March 9, 2001: Line 6 opened
Location

Itaewon is a station on Line 6 of the Seoul Metropolitan Subway. It takes its name from the neighborhood in which it is located in, also called Itaewon. There are many shops and restaurants for foreigners located close to Itaewon Station.

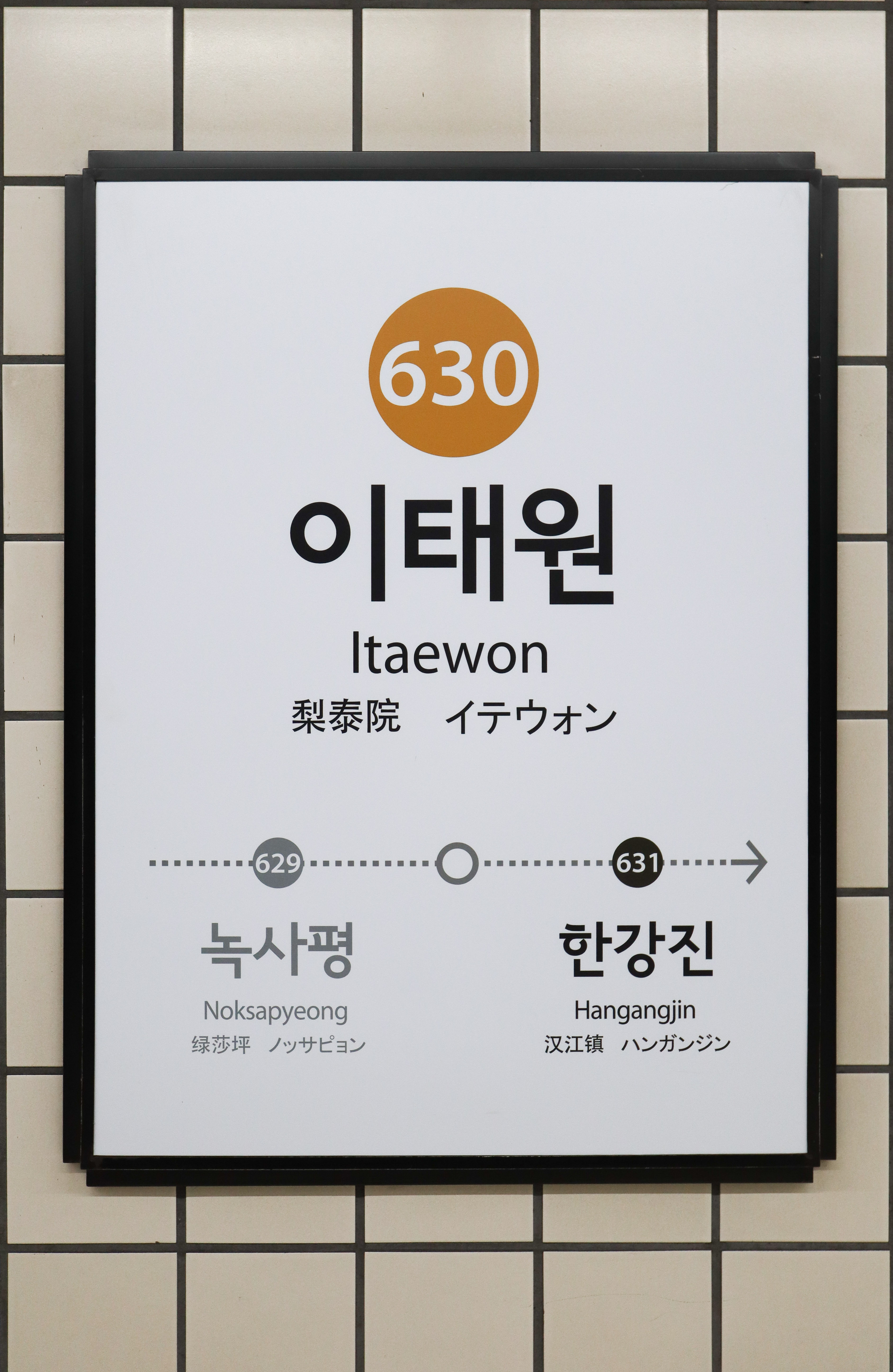
Station nameplate (new)

== Station layout ==
G	Street level	Exit

L1; Concourse	Lobby	Customer Service, Shops, Vending machines, ATMs

L2; Platform level	Westbound	← Line 6 toward Eungam (Noksapyeong)
L2; Platform level	Island platform, doors will open on the left
L2; Platform level	Eastbound	Line 6 toward Sinnae (Hangangjin) →

== Vicinity ==
- Exit 1 : Hamilton Hotel
- Exit 2 : Pakistani, Egyptian, Ecuadorian, Argentine Embassies in Korea
- Exit 3 : Bogwang Elementary School
- Exit 4 : Itaewon Market

== Tourism ==
In January 2013, the Seoul Metropolitan Rapid Transit Corporation, which operated the line and the station until Seoul Metro took over in 2017, distributed free guidebooks from the station. These were printed in three languages: English, Japanese and Chinese (simplified and traditional), which features eight tours as well as recommendations for accommodations, restaurants and shopping centers.

On October 29, 2022, the immediate vicinity of the station was the site of a human crowd crush.

Preceding station	Seoul Metropolitan Subway	Following station
Noksapyeong towards Eungam	Line 6	Hangangjin towards Sinnae
