= Noksapyeong station =

Train station in South Korea

Coordinates: 37°32′05″N 126°59′12″E

녹사평 (용산구청); Noksapeong (Yongsan-gu Office)
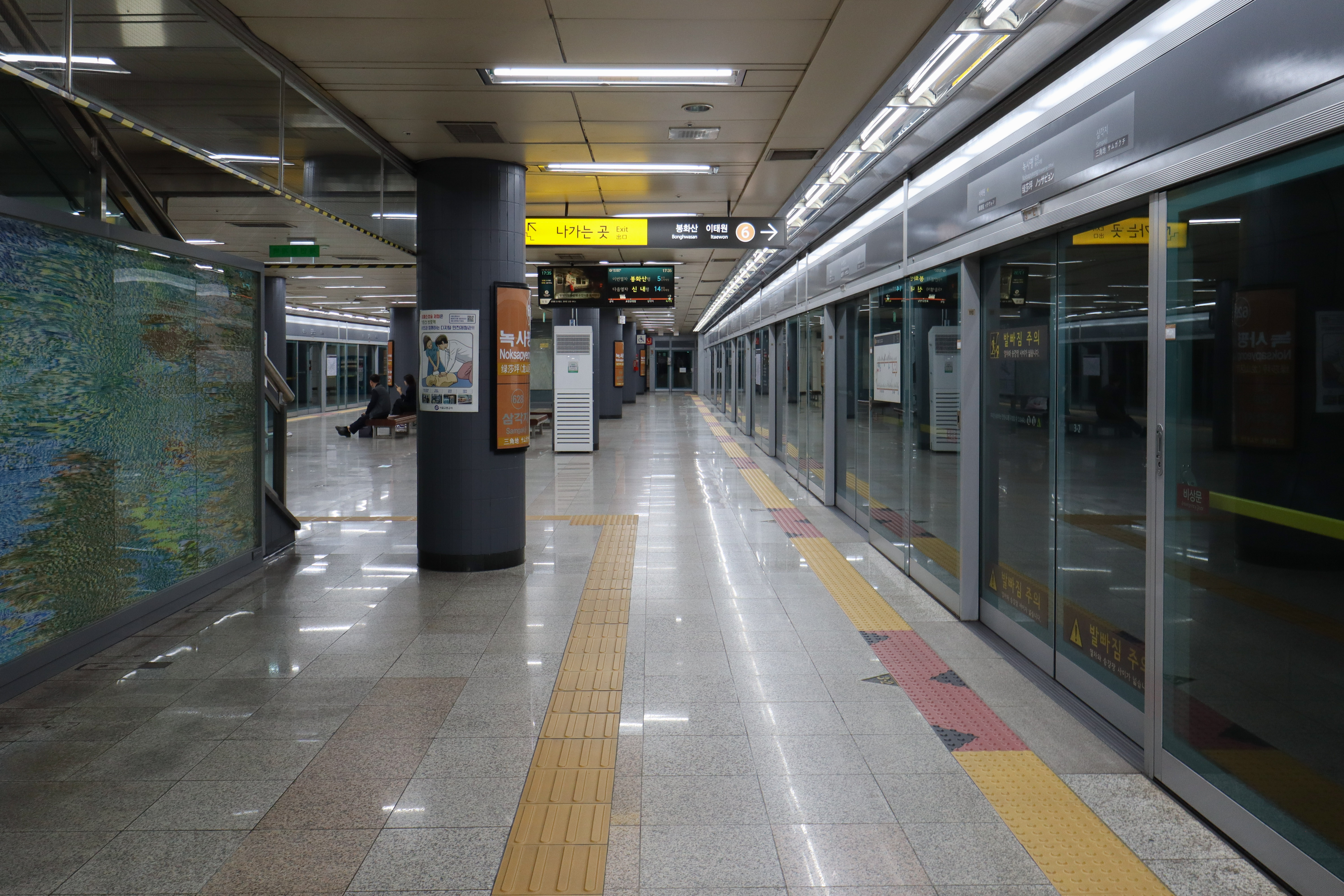
- Station Platform

Korean name
- Hangul: 녹사평역
- Hanja: 綠莎坪驛
- Revised Romanization: Noksapyeong-yeok
- McCune–Reischauer: Noksap'yŏng-yŏk

General information
- Location: 4 Yongsan-dong 4-ga, 195 Noksaypyeongdaero Jiha, Yongsan-gu, Seoul
- Operator: Seoul Metro
- Line: Line 6
- Platforms: 1
- Tracks: 2

Construction
- Structure type: Underground

Key dates
- December 15, 2000: Line 6 opened
Location

Noksapyeong Station is a subway station on the Seoul Subway Line 6. It is located on the eastern end of the Yongsan Garrison, and the western end of Itaewon. It is the main station servicing the Haebangchon and Hoenamu-gil communities, which are known for having significant foreign populations.

This station has low ridership due to its location, but is noted for its impressive interior design. It has five underground levels, and a glass dome on top of the building lets in sunlight which permeates throughout the station. In addition to being featured in Korean movies and dramas, weddings could be held there at no cost for a few years after opening. The embassy of the Philippines in South Korea is close to this station. Namsan lies just to the north, a 20-minute walk from the station.

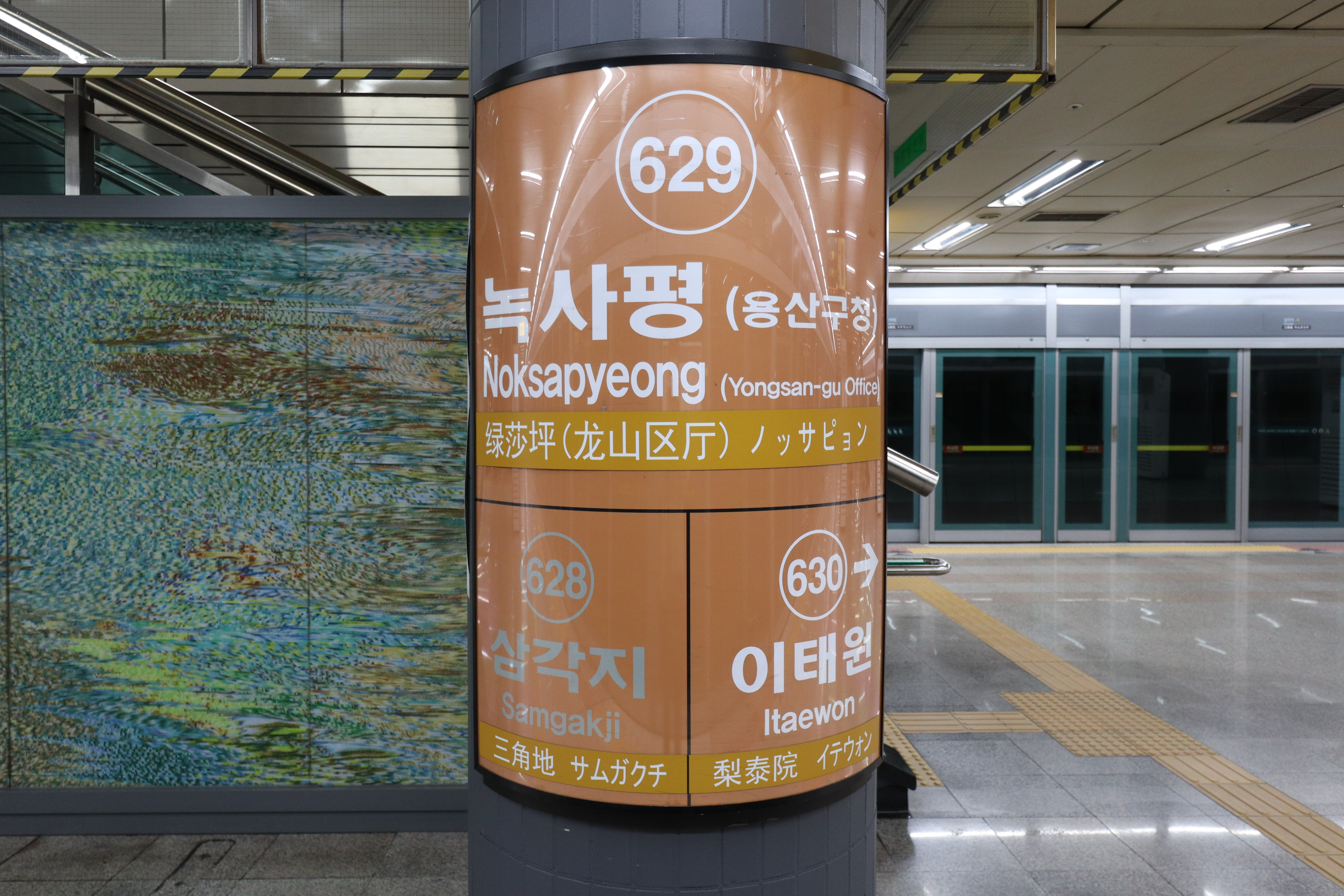
Station nameplate

== Station layout ==
G	Street level	Exit

L1; Concourse	Lobby	Customer Service, Shops, Vending machines, ATMs

L5; Platform level	Westbound	← Line 6 toward Eungam (Samgakji)
L5; Platform level	Island platform, doors will open on the left
L5; Platform level	Eastbound	Line 6 toward Sinnae (Itaewon) →

== Gallery ==
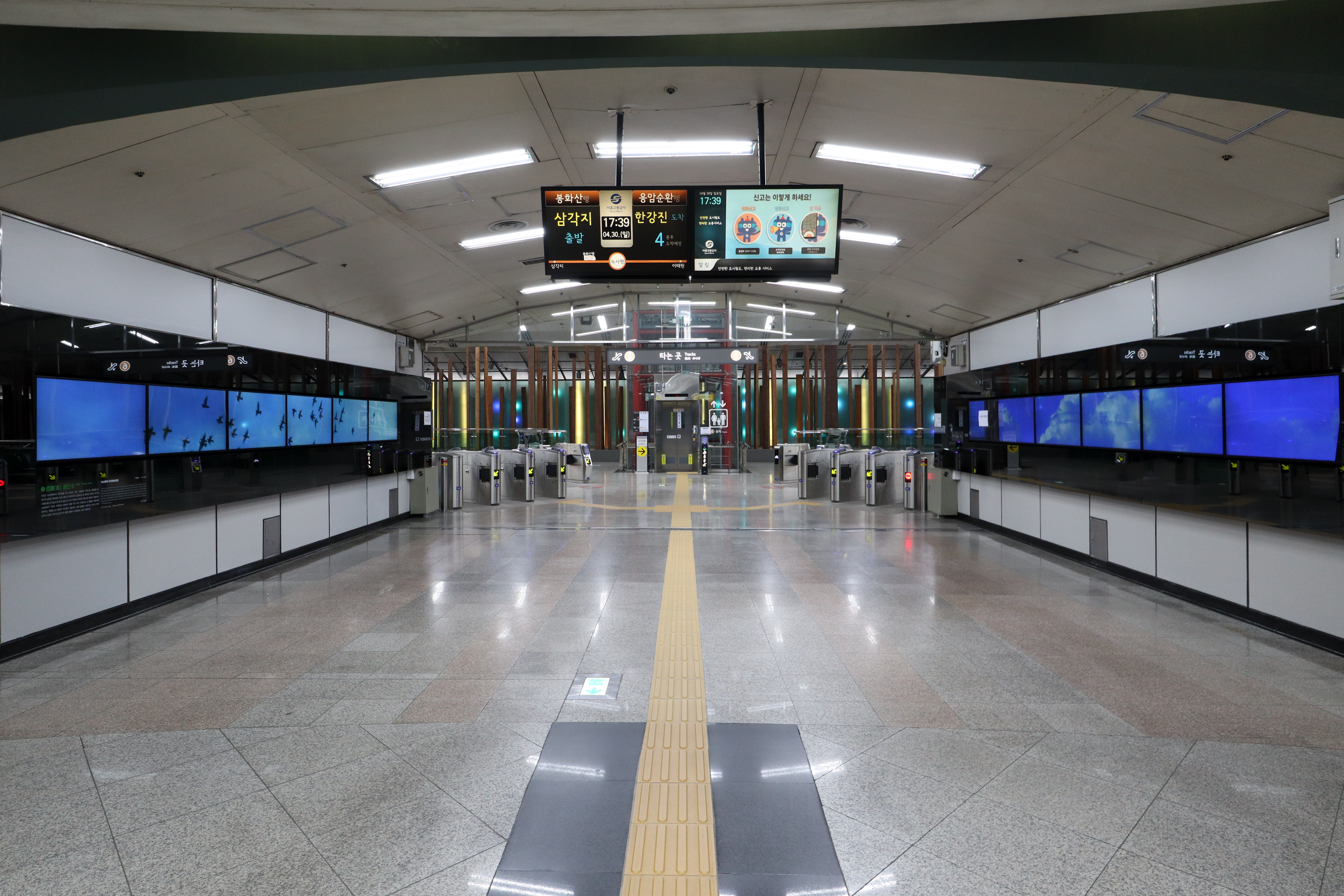

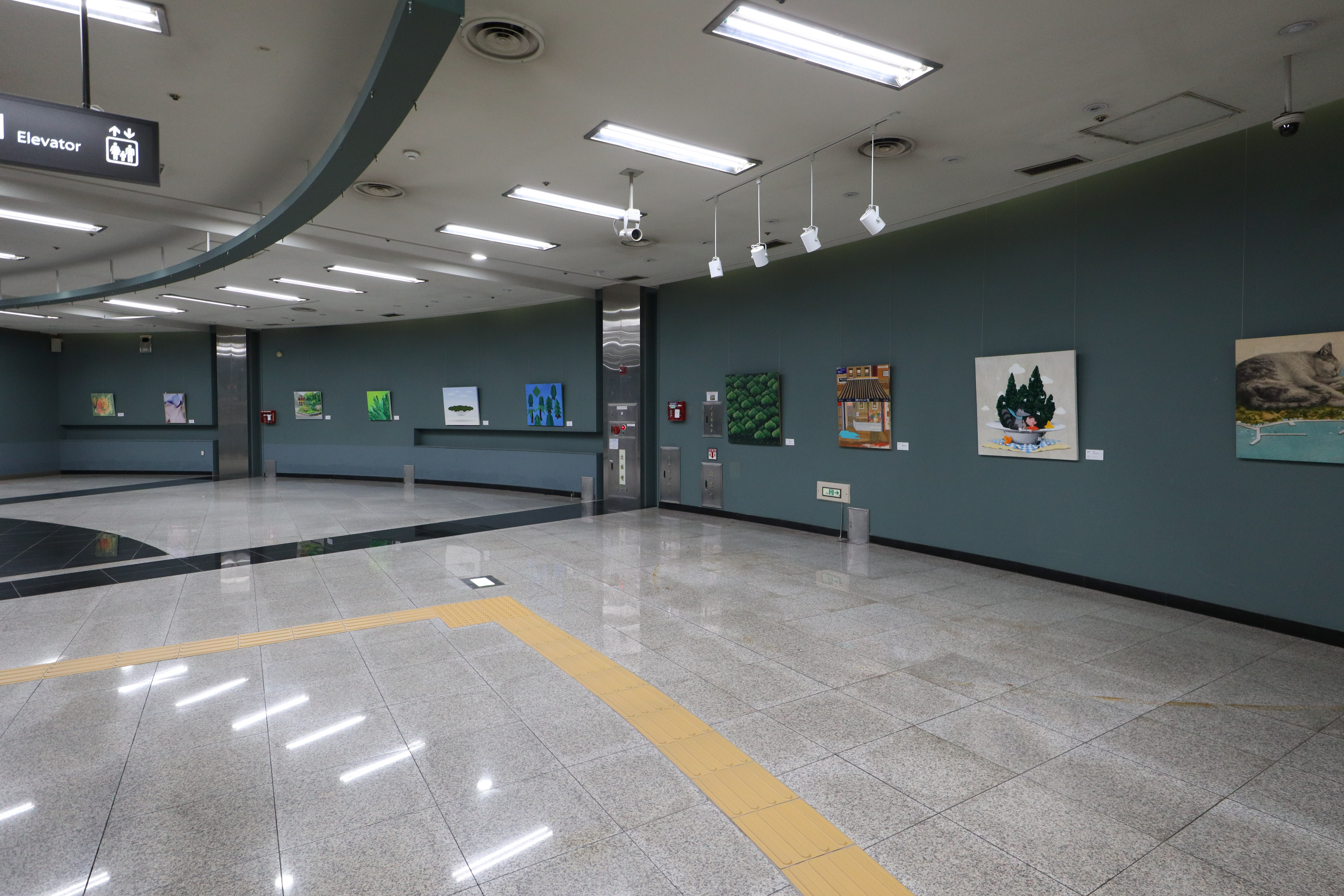

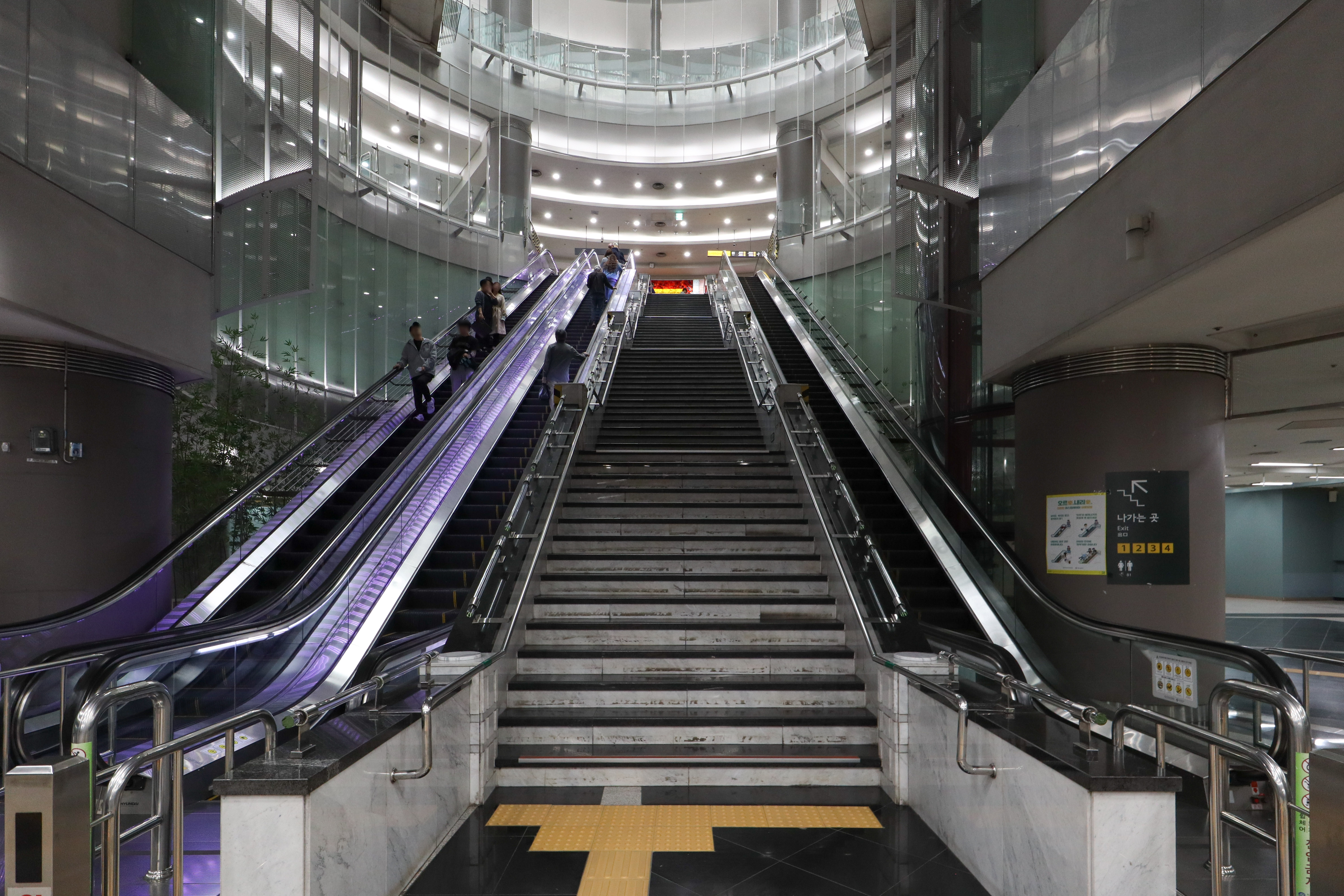

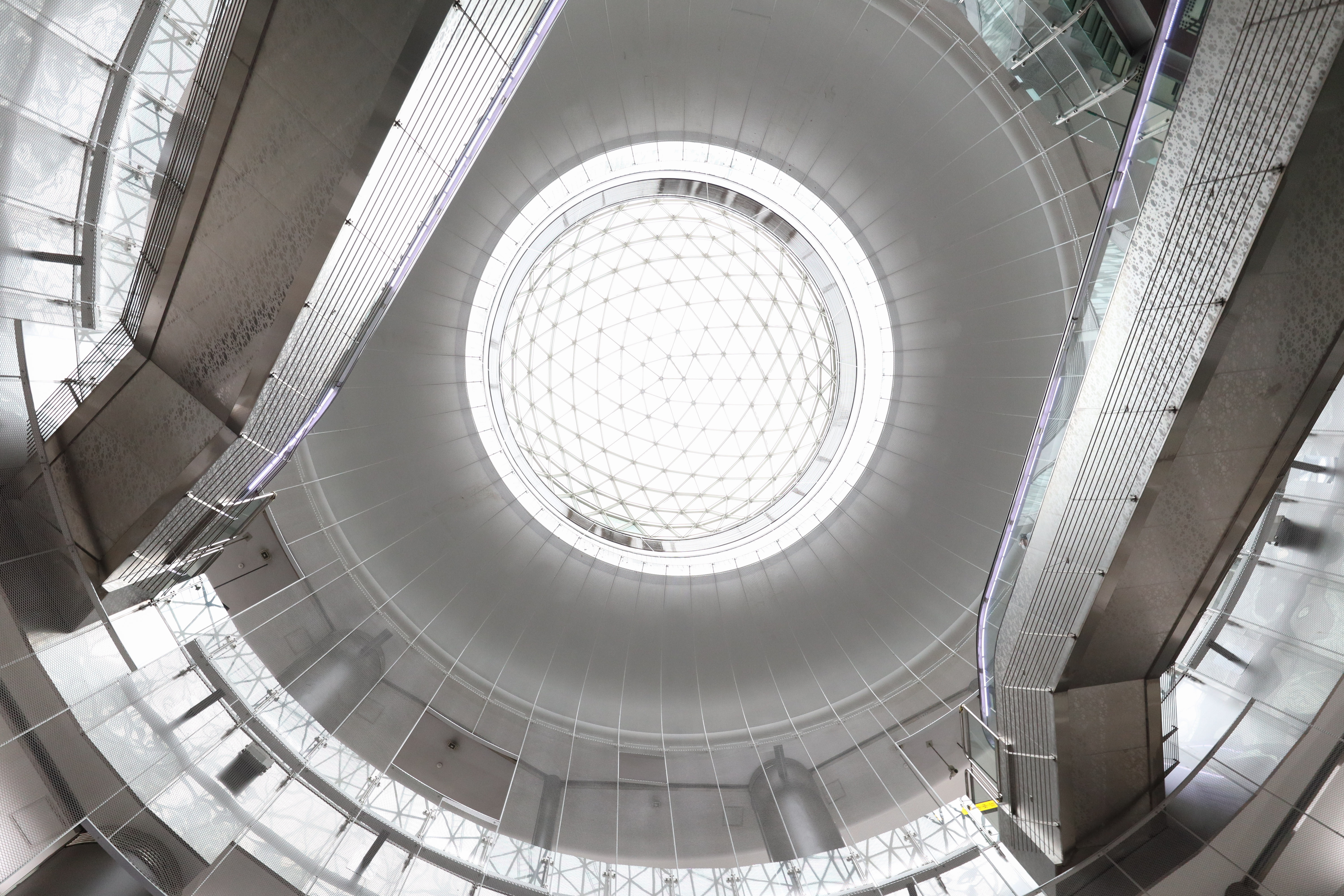

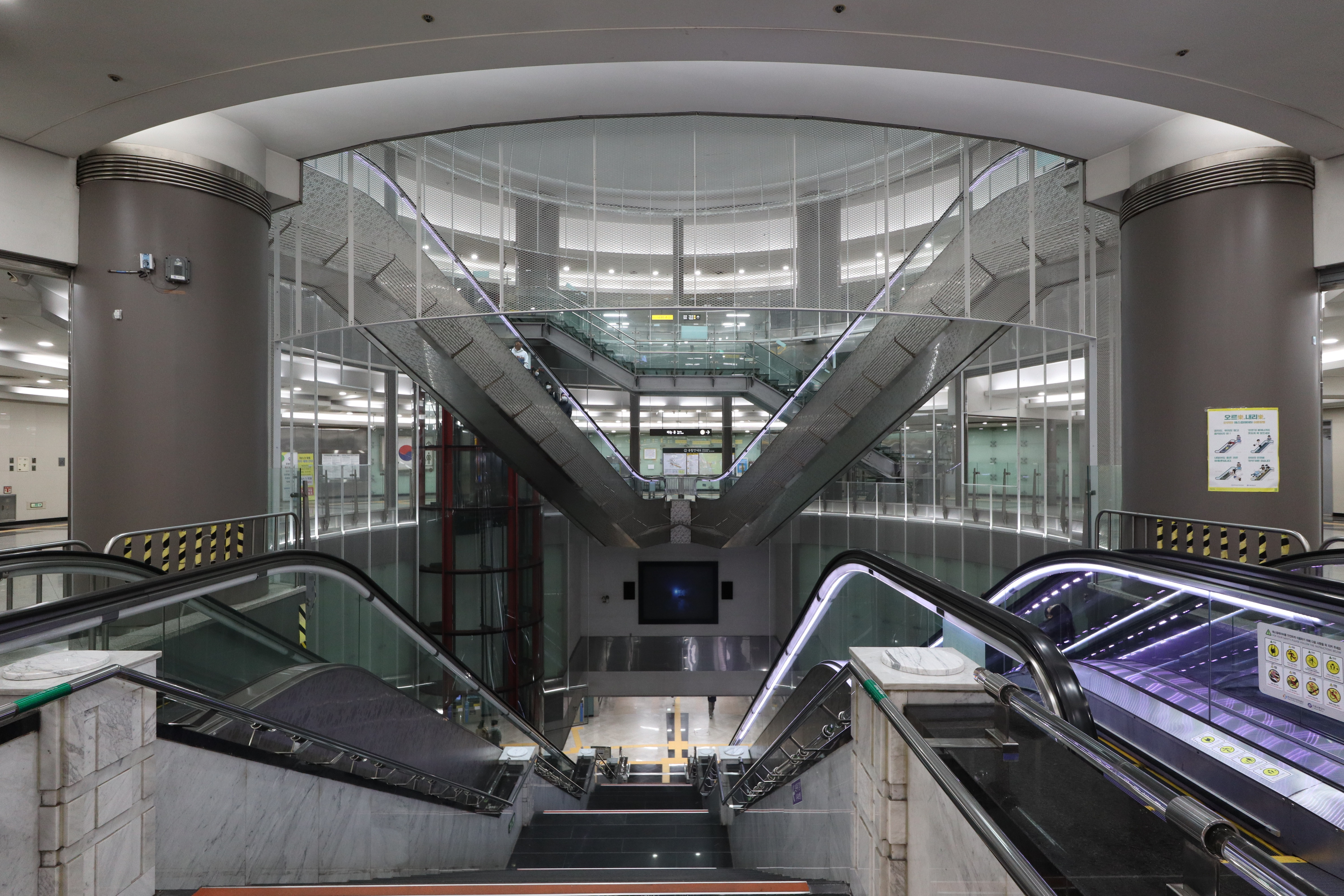

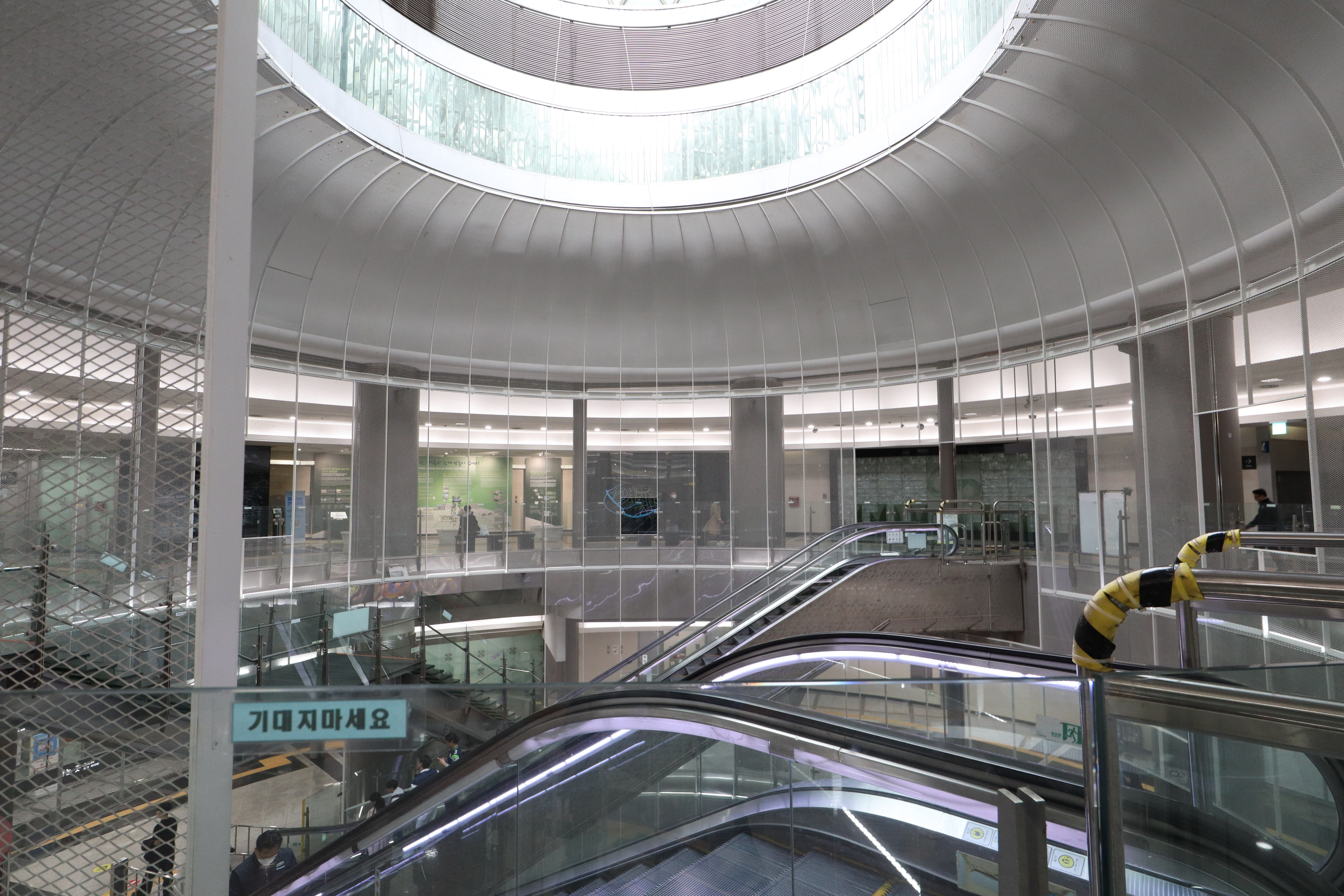

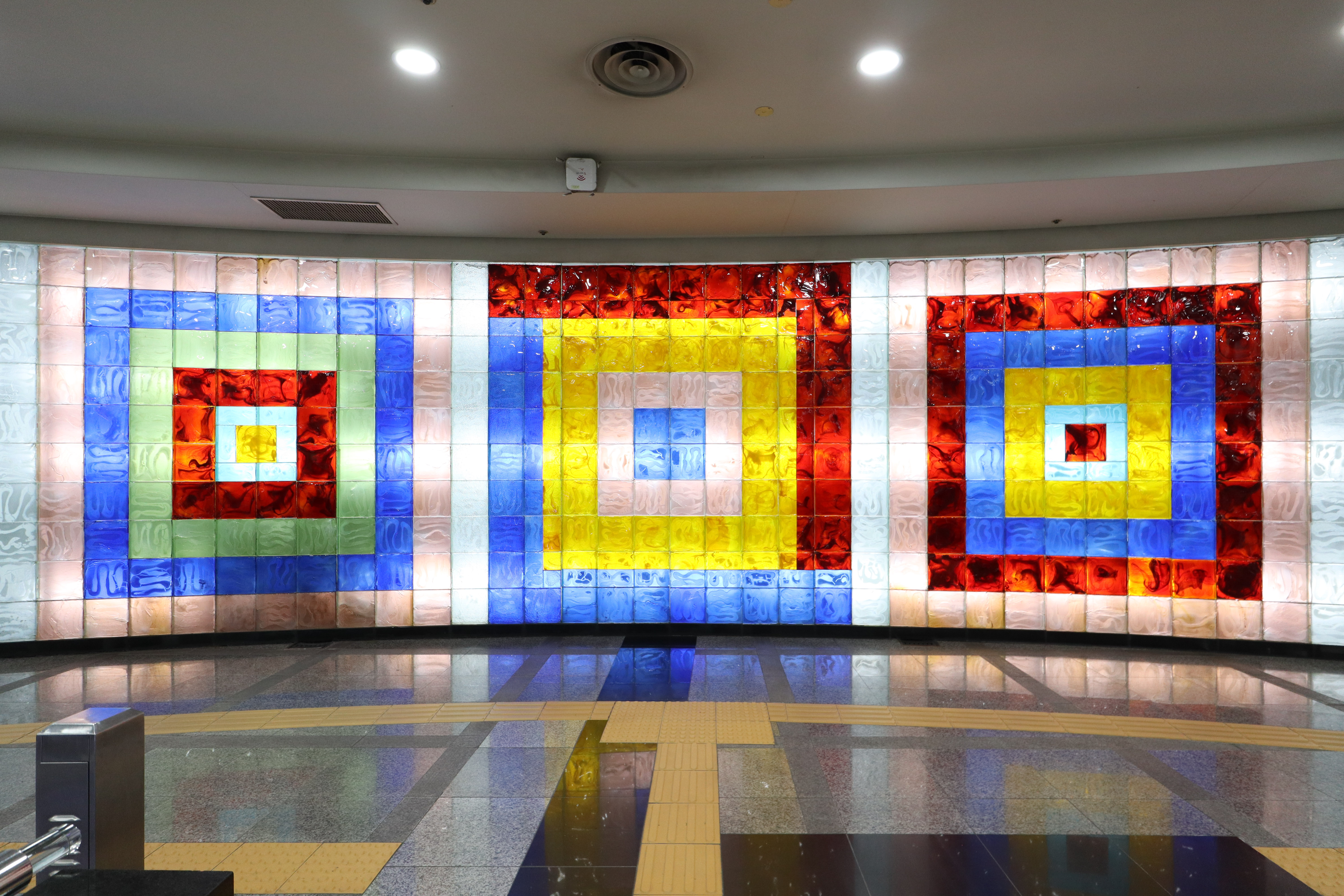

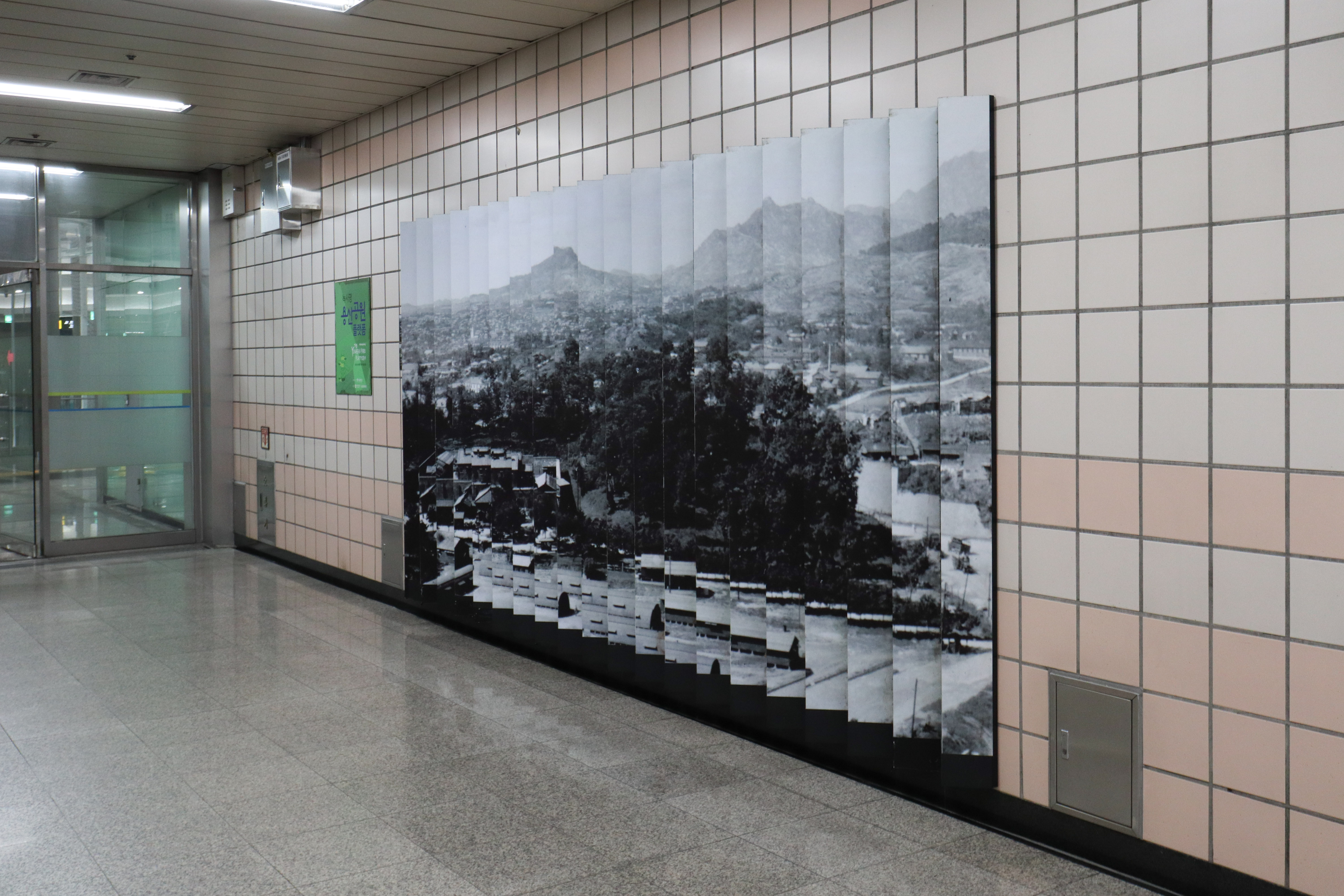

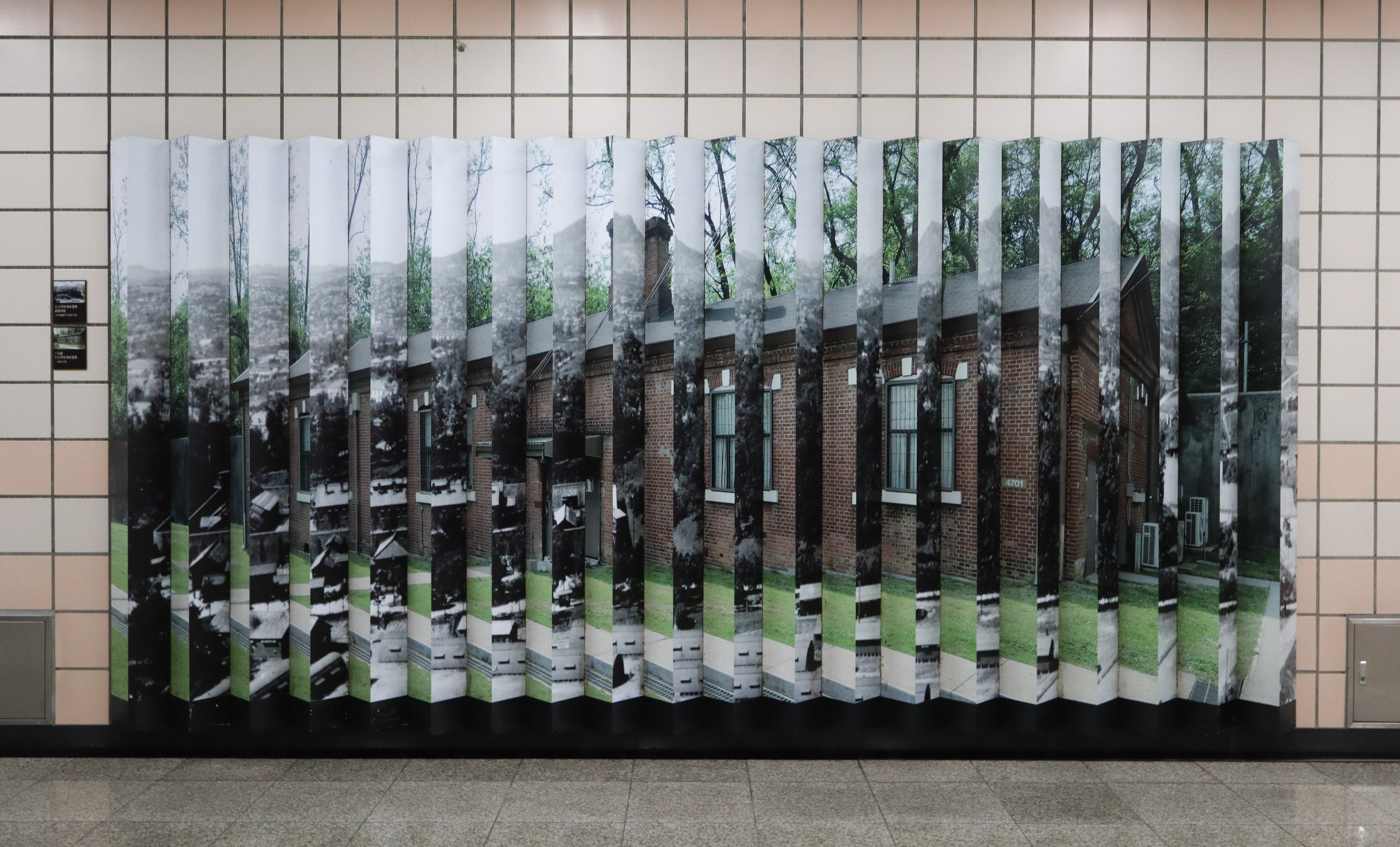

Preceding station	Seoul Metropolitan Subway	Following station
Samgakji towards Eungam	Line 6	Itaewon towards Sinnae
