= Seoul Subway Line 6 =

Subway line in Seoul, South Korea

Line 6
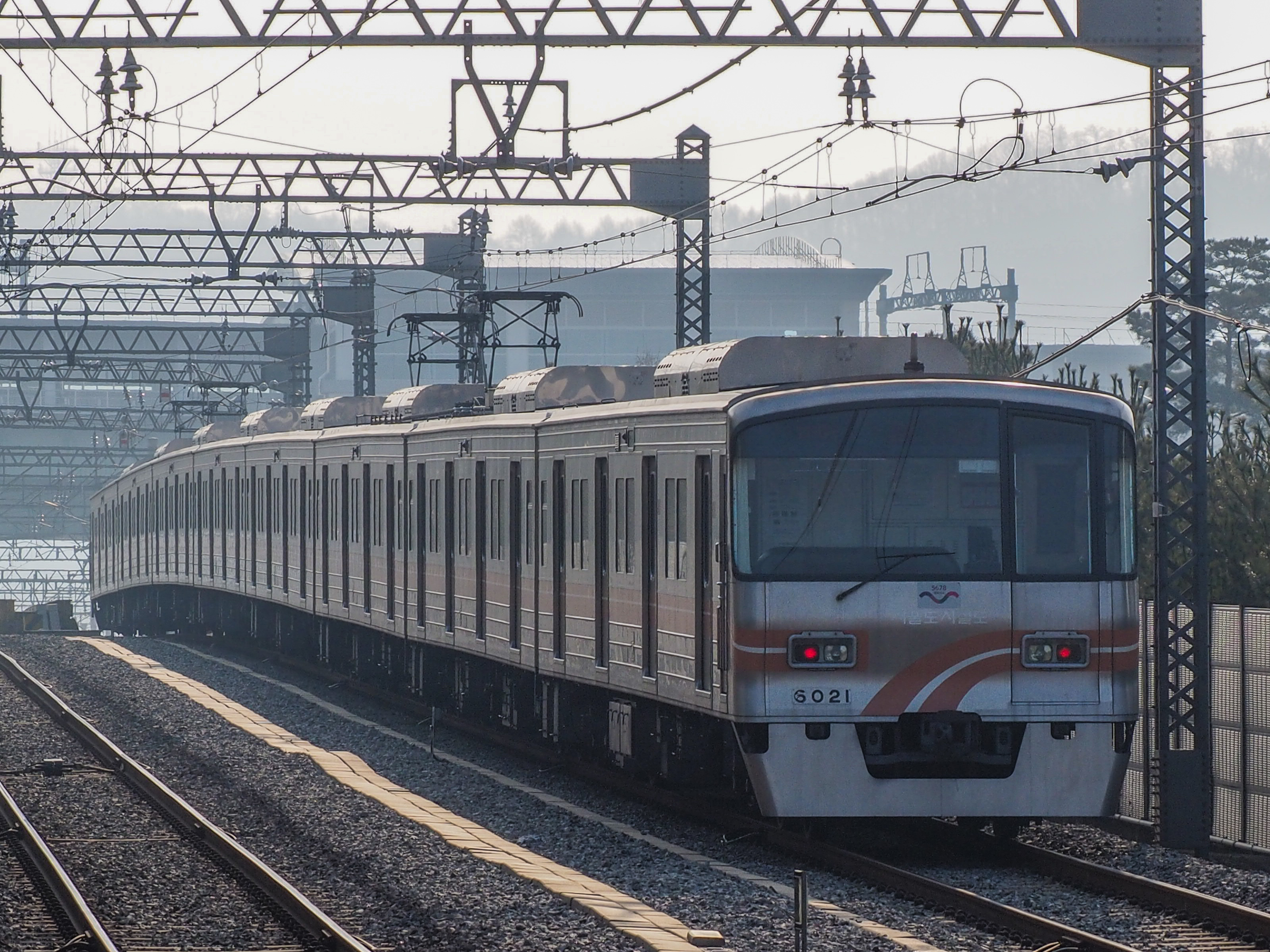

Overview
- Native name: 6호선(六號線); Yuk Hoseon
- Status: Operational
- Termini: Eungam; Bonghwasan / Sinnae
- Stations: 39

Service
- Type: Rapid transit
- System: Seoul Metropolitan Subway
- Operator: Seoul Metro
- Daily ridership: 522,260 (2024)
- Ridership: 191.15 million (2024) (▲2.7%)

History
- Opened: 7 August 2000; 26 years ago
- Last extension: 2019

Technical
- Line length: 36.4 km (22.6 mi)
- Number of tracks: 2
- Electrification: 1,500 V DC overhead catenary

Seoul Subway Line 6 is a line of the Seoul Metropolitan Subway. The route connects Eunpyeong-gu and Jungnang-gu in a U-shaped manner, running through Yongsan-gu and Seongbuk-gu. It does not cross the Han River. It is mainly used to connect to the northern outskirts of Seoul and to relieve the traffic on other lines.

Line 6 has a unique arrow-shaped station sign design not shared with its fellow lines. The main part of the sign has the shape of a chevron pointing in the direction trains run, with the number printed in the top half, the Hangul name of the station in the middle, and the bottom half containing the English and Hanja names. An arm pointing out of the "front" (the pointed end) of the chevron indicates the next station, while an arm pointing out of the "back" (the indent) of the chevron indicates the previous station. The design is similar to Line 5, 7, and 8's station signs, but with a chevron instead of a triangle.

The line primarily operates in the section between Eungam and Sinnae, though some trains end one station before at Bonghwasan. When a train arrives at Eungam, it runs through what is commonly known as the "Eungam Loop," a one-way counterclockwise loop consisting of several stations. After going through the stations of the Eungam Loop, the train reaches Eungam again, from which it continues to Bonghwasan or Sinnae.

== History ==
The line started construction in 1994. A short section of the line from Bonghwasan to Sangwolgok opened in August 2000 while the remaining section opened in December of the same year. However, it was not until March 2001 that the whole line was fully operational when the four stations from Itaewon to Yaksu were opened.

Upon the opening of the electrified Gyeongchun Line in December 2010, Seoul Metro proposed extending the line 1 km eastward to connect to the Gyeongchun Line at a new Sinnae station, located in the current Sinnae Depot. Construction on the station started in late 2018 and the extension opened on 21 December 2019. In 2019, Line 6 had an annual ridership of 205 million or about 562 thousand people per day.

== Tourism ==
In January 2013, the Seoul Metropolitan Rapid Transit Corporation, which operates this line, published free guidebooks in three languages: English, Japanese and Chinese (simplified and traditional), which features eight tours as well as recommendations for accommodations, restaurants and shopping centers. These were distributed from information centers on this line. The tours are designed with different themes for travel along the subway lines, e.g. Korean traditional culture, which goes from Jongno 3-ga Station to Anguk Station and Gyeongbokgung Station on line 3 that showcases antique shops and art galleries of Insa-dong.

== Stations ==
All stations are located in Seoul.

=== Current Routes ===
- Eungam — Bonghwasan via Eungam loop (most trains)
- Eungam — Sinnae via Eungam loop (selected trains)

=== Stations ===
Station Number	Station Name English	Station Name Hangul	Transfer	Line Name	Distance in km	Total Distance	Location
610	Eungam	응암		Eungam loop of Line 6	---	0.0	Eunpyeong-gu
611	Yeokchon	역촌		Eungam loop of Line 6	1.1	1.1	Eunpyeong-gu
612	Bulgwang	불광	Seoul Subway Line 3	Eungam loop of Line 6	0.8	1.9	Eunpyeong-gu
613	Dokbawi	독바위		Eungam loop of Line 6	0.9	2.8	Eunpyeong-gu
614	Yeonsinnae	연신내	Great Train eXpress	Eungam loop of Line 6	1.4	4.2	Eunpyeong-gu
615	Gusan	구산		Eungam loop of Line 6	0.9	5.1	Eunpyeong-gu
610	Eungam	응암		Eungam loop of Line 6	1.5	6.6	Eunpyeong-gu
616	Saejeol (Sinsa)	새절 (신사)		Line 6	0.9	7.5	Eunpyeong-gu
617	Jeungsan (Myongji University)	증산 (명지대앞)		Line 6	0.9	8.4	Eunpyeong-gu
618	Digital Media City	디지털미디어시티	Gyeongui–Jungang Line	Line 6	1.1	9.5	Eunpyeong-gu
619	World Cup Stadium (Seongsan)	월드컵경기장 (성산)		Line 6	0.8	10.3	Mapo-gu
620	Mapo-gu Office	마포구청		Line 6	0.8	11.1	Mapo-gu
621	Mangwon	망원		Line 6	1.0	12.1	Mapo-gu
622	Hapjeong (Holt Children's Services Inc.)	합정 (홀트아동복지회)	Seoul Subway Line 2	Line 6	0.8	12.9	Mapo-gu
623	Sangsu	상수		Line 6	0.8	13.7	Mapo-gu
624	Gwangheungchang (Seogang)	광흥창 (서강)		Line 6	0.9	14.6	Mapo-gu
625	Daeheung (Sogang University)	대흥 (서강대앞)		Line 6	1.0	15.6	Mapo-gu
626	Gongdeok	공덕	Gyeongui–Jungang Line	Line 6	0.9	16.5	Mapo-gu
627	Hyochang Park	효창공원앞	Gyeongui–Jungang Line	Line 6	0.9	17.4	Yongsan-gu
628	Samgakji	삼각지	Seoul Subway Line 4	Line 6	1.2	18.6	Yongsan-gu
629	Noksapyeong (Yongsan-gu Office)	녹사평 (용산구청)		Line 6	1.1	19.7	Yongsan-gu
630	Itaewon	이태원		Line 6	0.8	20.5	Yongsan-gu
631	Hangangjin	한강진		Line 6	1.0	21.5	Yongsan-gu
632	Beotigogae	버티고개		Line 6	1.0	22.5	Jung-gu
633	Yaksu	약수	Seoul Subway Line 3	Line 6	0.7	23.2	Jung-gu
634	Cheonggu	청구	Seoul Subway Line 5	Line 6	0.8	24.0	Jung-gu
635	Sindang	신당	Seoul Subway Line 2	Line 6	0.7	24.7	Jung-gu
636	Dongmyo	동묘앞	Seoul Subway Line 1	Line 6	0.6	25.3	Jongno-gu
637	Changsin	창신		Line 6	0.9	26.2	Jongno-gu
638	Bomun	보문	Ui LRT	Line 6	0.8	27.0	Seongbuk-gu
639	Anam (Korea Univ. Hospital)	안암 (고대병원앞)		Line 6	0.9	27.9	Seongbuk-gu
640	Korea University (Jongam)	고려대 (종암)		Line 6	0.8	28.7	Seongbuk-gu
641	Wolgok (Dongduk Women's University)	월곡 (동덕여대)		Line 6	1.4	30.1	Seongbuk-gu
642	Sangwolgok (KIST)	상월곡 (한국과학기술연구원)		Line 6	0.8	30.9	Seongbuk-gu
643	Dolgoji	돌곶이		Line 6	0.8	31.7	Seongbuk-gu
644	Seokgye	석계	Seoul Subway Line 1	Line 6	1.0	32.7	Nowon-gu
645	Taereung	태릉입구	Seoul Subway Line 7	Line 6	0.8	33.5	Nowon-gu
646	Hwarangdae (Seoul Women's Univ.)	화랑대 (서울여대입구)		Line 6	0.9	34.4	Nowon-gu
647	Bonghwasan (Seoul Medical Center)	봉화산 (서울의료원)		Line 6	0.7	35.1	Jungnang-gu
648	Sinnae	신내	Gyeongchun Line	Line 6	1.3	36.4	Jungnang-gu

== Rolling stock ==
=== Current ===
==== Seoul Metro ====
- Seoul Metro 6000 series
  - 1st generation – since 1999
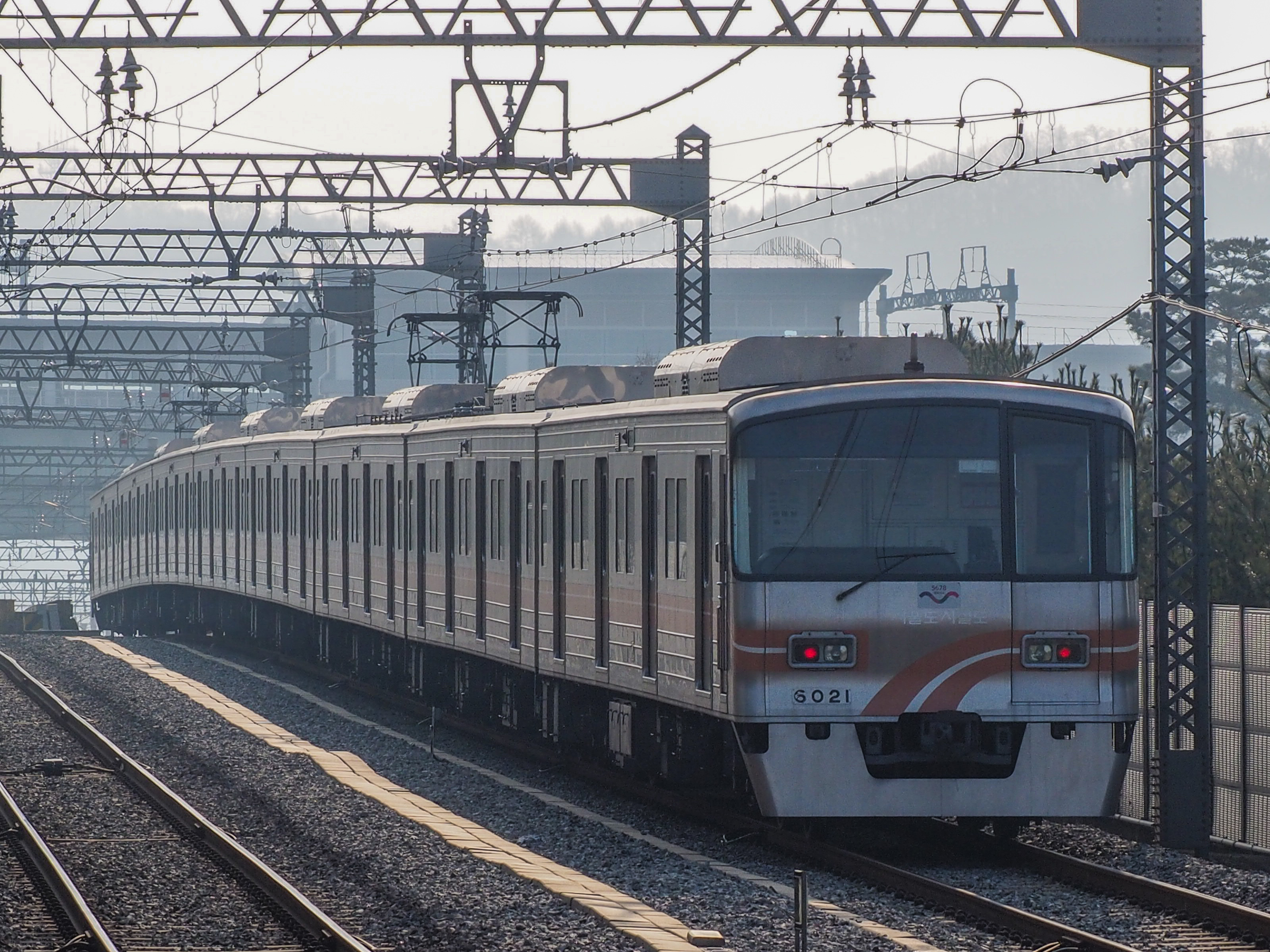
Seoul Metro 6000-series EMU

== Ridership ==
Seoul Subway Line 6 Ridership (Note: The ridership is calculated based on boarding and transferring passengers (a+c). The data tallies between the two sources but the Seoul Metro source is more granular. The ridership data is derived from the 서울교통공사 수송실적 (Seoul Metro transport performance) data/report.)
Year	Ridership	Change (%)	Remarks
2026	96,779,361		Updated as of June 2026
2025	190,648,157	▼0.3	
2024	191,147,160	▲2.7	
2023	186,073,000	▲9.1	
2022	170,514,000	▲13.3	
2021	150,515,000	▲1.6	
2020	148,148,000	▼27.6	COVID-19 pandemic
2019	204,576,000	▲0.6	Highest on record; Opening of Sinnae extension
2018	203,287,000	▼0.8	
2017	205,011,000	▲0.2	
2016	204,508,000	▲3.9	
2015	196,924,000	▼0.1	
2014	197,176,000	▲2.5	
2013	192,432,000	▲2.0	
2012	188,572,000	▲3.2	
2011	182,791,000	▲2.9	
2010	177,622,000	▲7.8	
2009	164,820,000	▲1.7	
2008	162,045,000	▲2.3	
2007	158,442,000	▲0.2	
2006	158,188,000	▲2.9	
2005	153,781,000	▲0.2	
2004	153,433,000	▲8.5	
2003	141,379,000	▲9.1	
2002	129,571,000	▲26.7	
2001	102,273,000	▲2,007.4	Opening of four infill stations between Noksapyeong and Cheonggu
2000	4,853,000	-	Operations began on August 7, 2000

== See also ==
- Subways in South Korea
- Seoul Metropolitan Rapid Transit Corporation
- Seoul Metropolitan Subway
