= Bonghwasan station =

Station of the Seoul Metropolitan Subway

봉화산 (서울의료원); Bonghwasan (Seoul Medical Center)
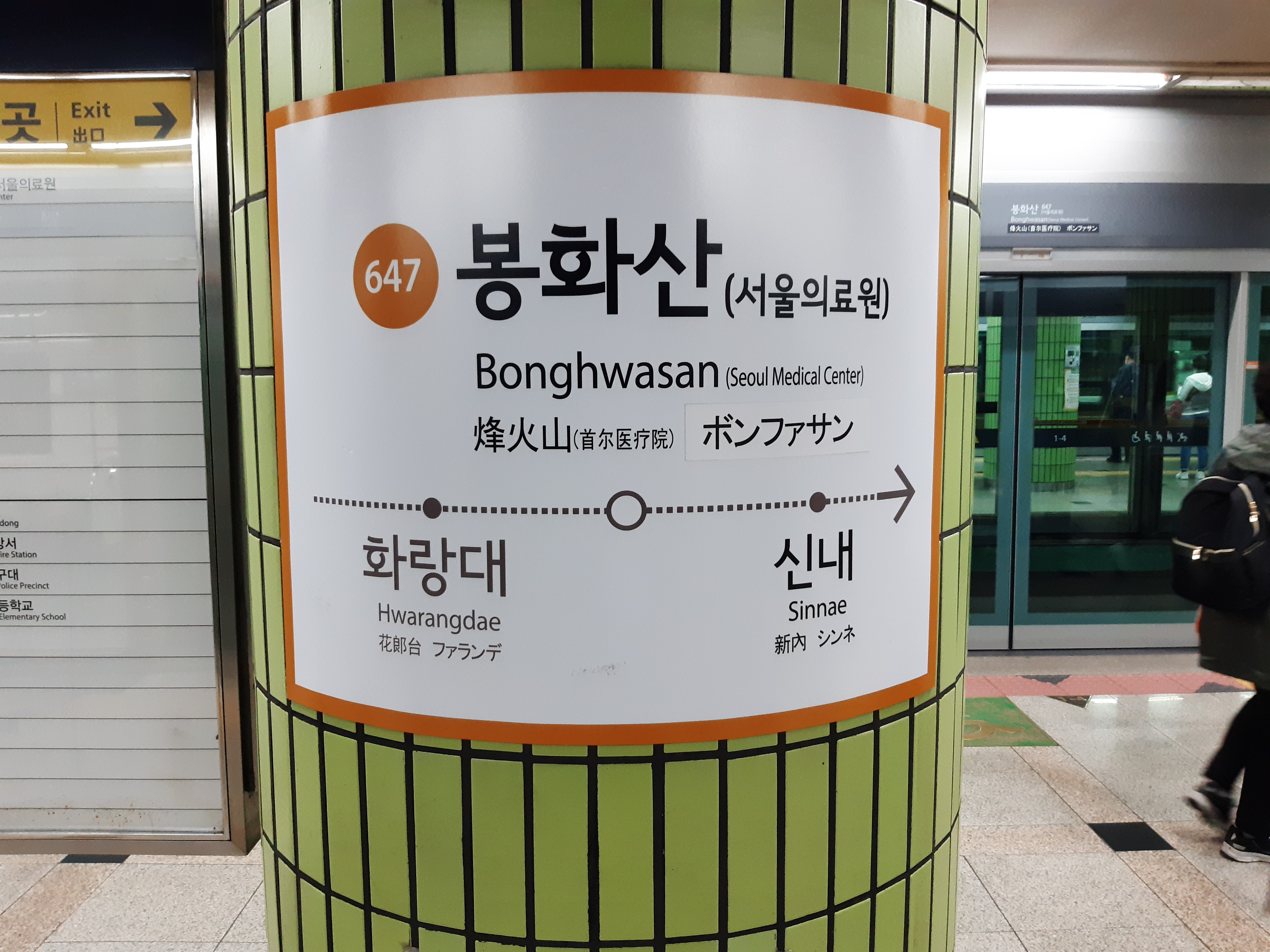
- Station nameplate

Korean name
- Hangul: 봉화산역
- Hanja: 烽火山驛
- Revised Romanization: Bonghwasannyeok
- McCune–Reischauer: Ponghwasannyŏk

General information
- Location: 643-3 Sinnae-dong, Jungnang-gu, Seoul
- Coordinates: 37°37′03″N 127°05′29″E
- Operated by: Seoul Metro
- Line(s): Line 6
- Platforms: 2
- Tracks: 3

Construction
- Structure type: Underground

History
- Opened: August 7, 2000

Services
Preceding station	Seoul Metropolitan Subway	Following station
Hwarangdae towards Eungam	Line 6	Sinnae Terminus

Bonghwasan Station is a railway station in Jungnang District, Seoul, South Korea. It was the eastern terminus of Seoul Subway Line 6 until December 21, 2019, though many eastbound trains still terminate here, as Sinnae station is only allowed to accommodate 1 train at a time as the Line 6 station only has one track and one platform, but it will be expanded to 2 tracks and 2 platforms in the future.

== Station layout ==
G	Street level	Exit

L1; Concourse	Lobby	Customer Service, Shops, Vending machines, ATMs

L2; Platform level	Westbound	← Line 6 toward Eungam (Hwarangdae)
L2; Platform level	Island platform, doors will open on the left, right
L2; Platform level	Eastbound	Line 6 Alighting Passengers Only →
L2; Platform level	Island platform, doors will open on the left, right
L2; Platform level	Eastbound	Line 6 toward Sinnae (Terminus) →
