= Yaksu station =

Station of the Seoul Metropolitan Subway

약수; Yaksu
약수; Yaksu
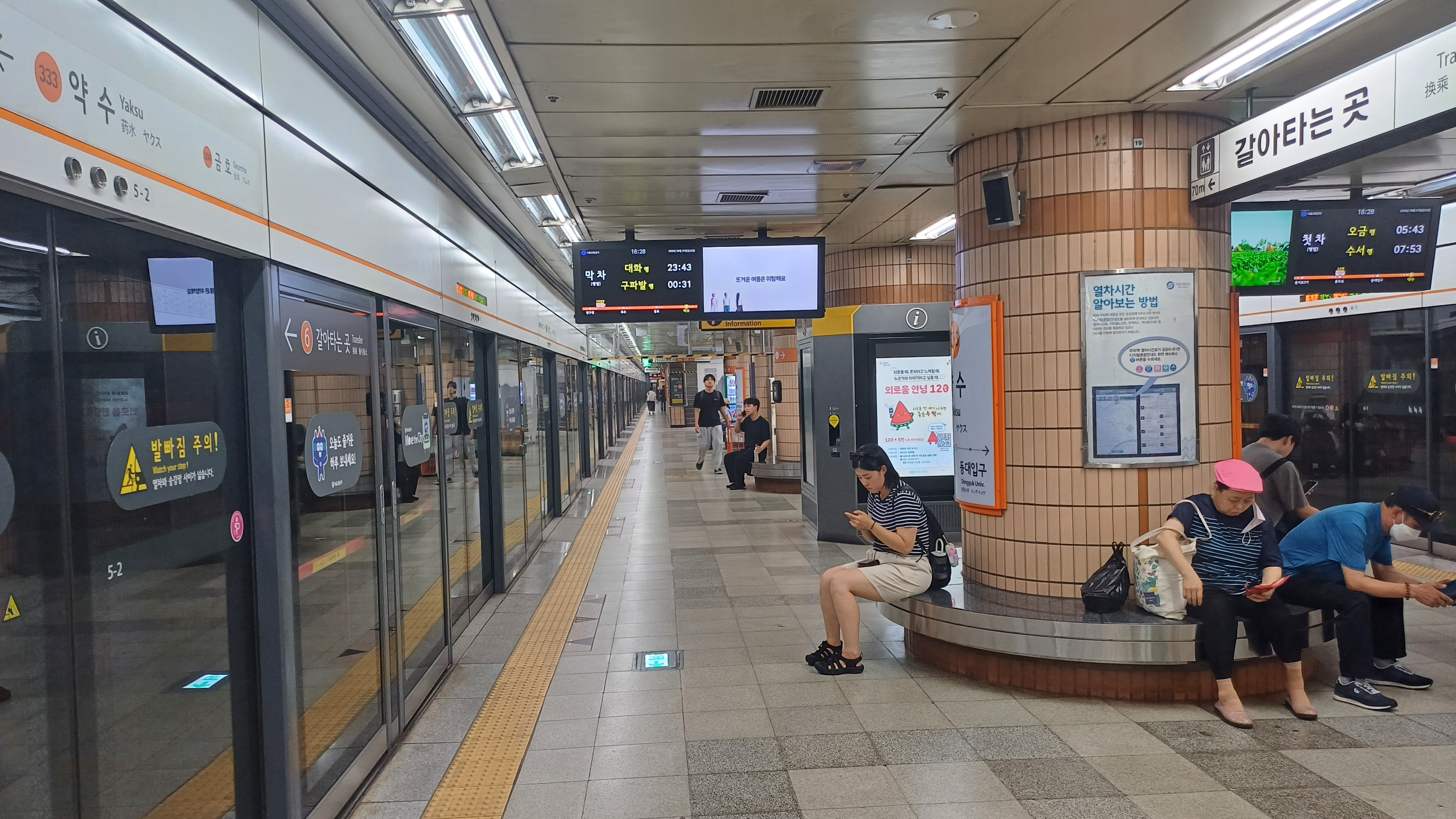
- Line 3 platforms

Korean name
- Hangul: 약수역
- Hanja: 藥水驛
- Revised Romanization: Yaksu-yeok
- McCune–Reischauer: Yaksu-yŏk

General information
- Location: Line 3 Dasan-ro Jiha 122; Line 6 Dasan-ro Jiha 115; Jung-gu, Seoul
- Coordinates: 37°33′15″N 127°00′37″E
- Operator: Seoul Metro
- Lines: Line 3 Line 6
- Platforms: 3
- Tracks: 4

Construction
- Structure type: Underground

Key dates
- October 18, 1985: Line 3 opened
- March 9, 2001: Line 6 opened
Location

Yaksu Station is a subway station on the Seoul Subway Line 3 and Line 6 in Jung-gu, Seoul.

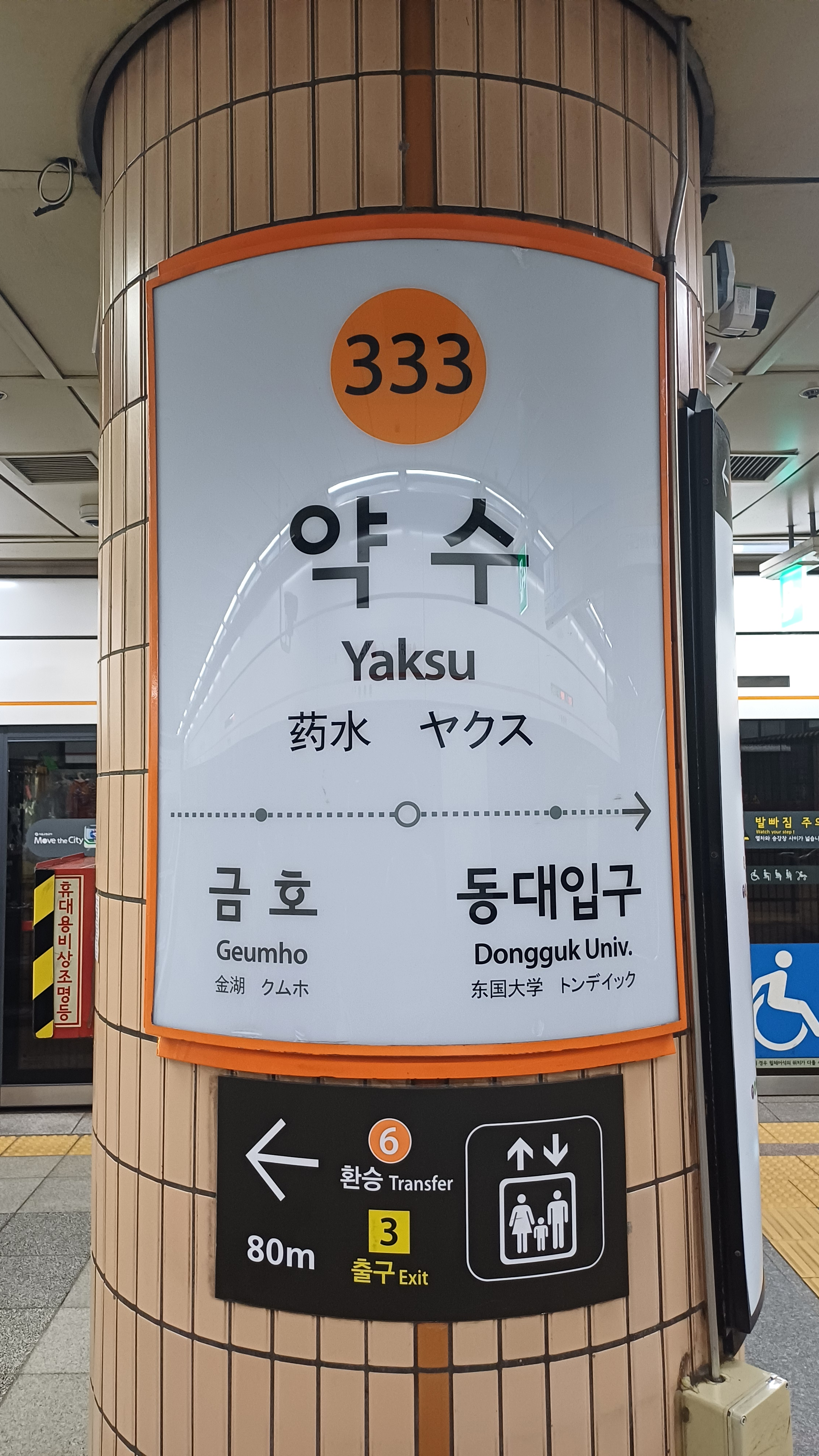
Line 3 station nameplate

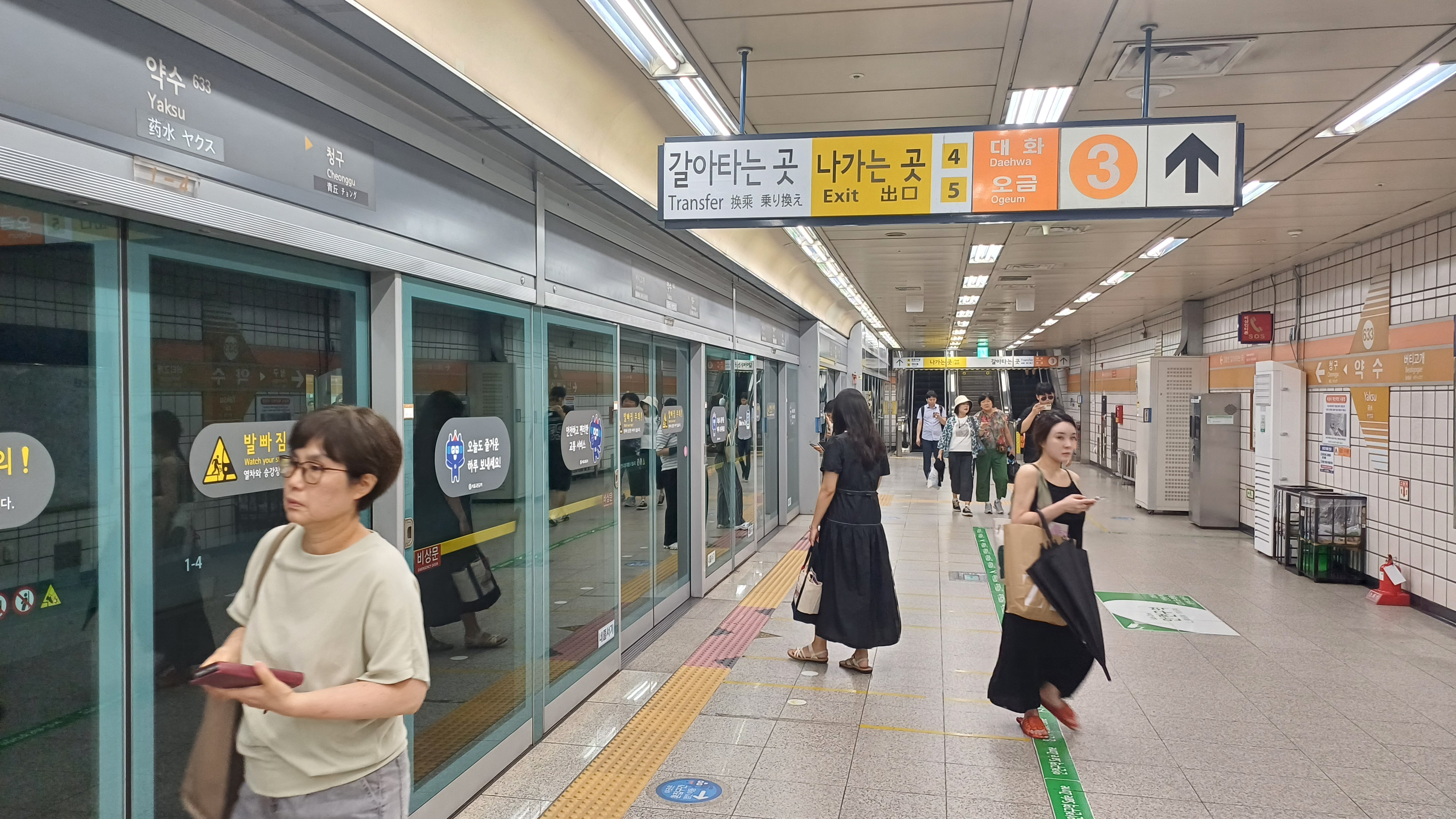
Line 6 platform

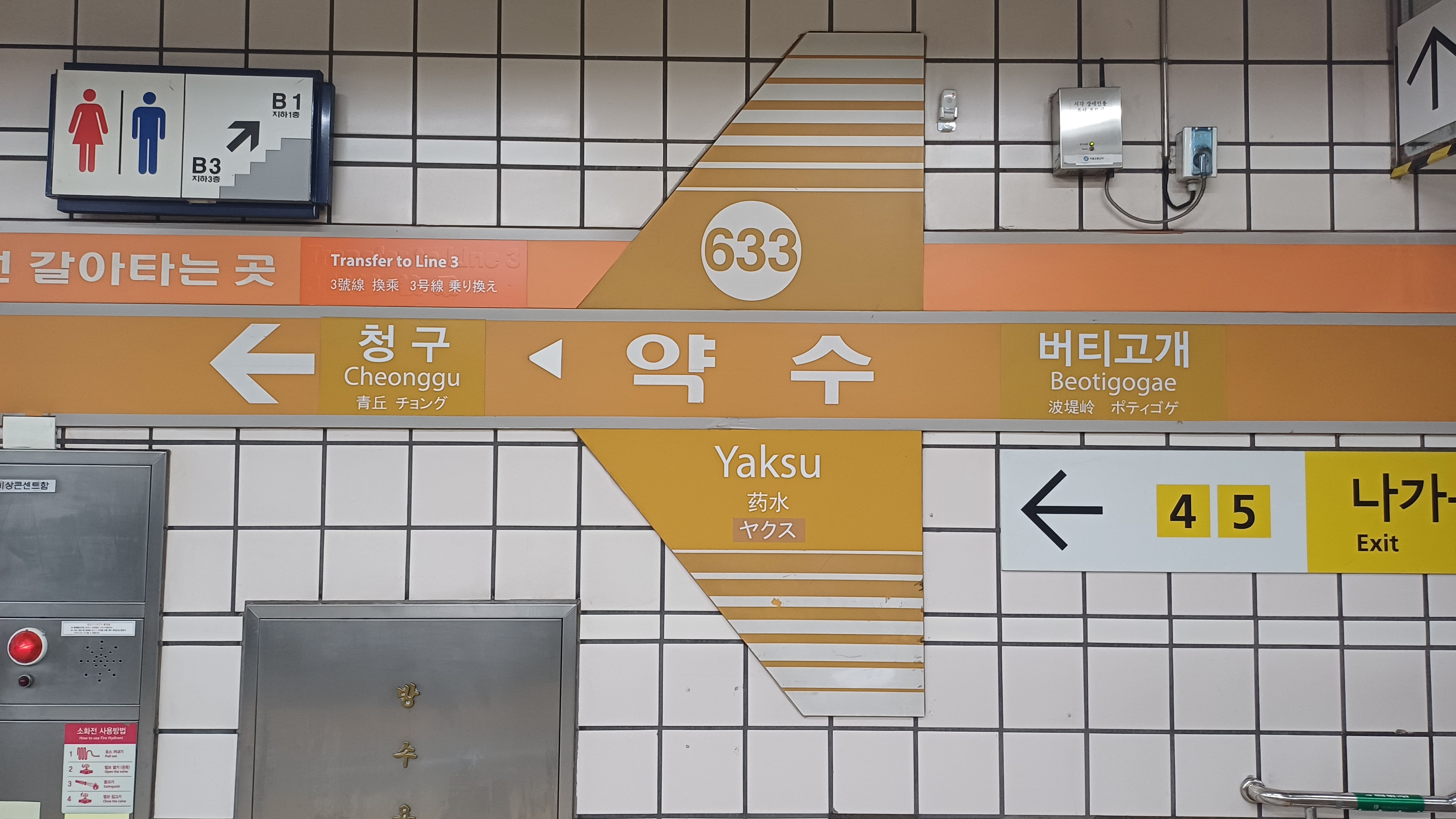
Line 6 station nameplate

== Station layout ==
G	Street level	Exit

L1; Concourse	Lobby	Customer service, shops, vending machines, ATMs

L2; Line 3 platform	Northbound	← Line 3 toward Daehwa (Dongguk University)
L2; Line 3 platform	Island platform, doors will open on the left
L2; Line 3 platform	Southbound	Line 3 toward Ogeum (Geumho) →

L3; Line 6 platforms	Side platform, doors will open on the right
L3; Line 6 platforms	Westbound	← Line 6 toward Eungam (Beotigogae)
L3; Line 6 platforms	Eastbound	Line 6 toward Sinnae (Cheonggu) →
L3; Line 6 platforms	Side platform, doors will open on the right

== Overview ==
Yaksu area is a largely residential area. Around the station, there are many shops such as Dunkin' Donuts, STCO (Shop selling men's clothes) and cafés. Several grocery stores and the Yaksu post office are also near. It is also close to Dongguk University station and the school.

Preceding station	Seoul Metropolitan Subway	Following station
Dongguk University towards Daehwa	Line 3	Geumho towards Ogeum
Beotigogae towards Eungam	Line 6	Cheonggu towards Sinnae
