= Seoul Metro 6000 series =

South Korean train type

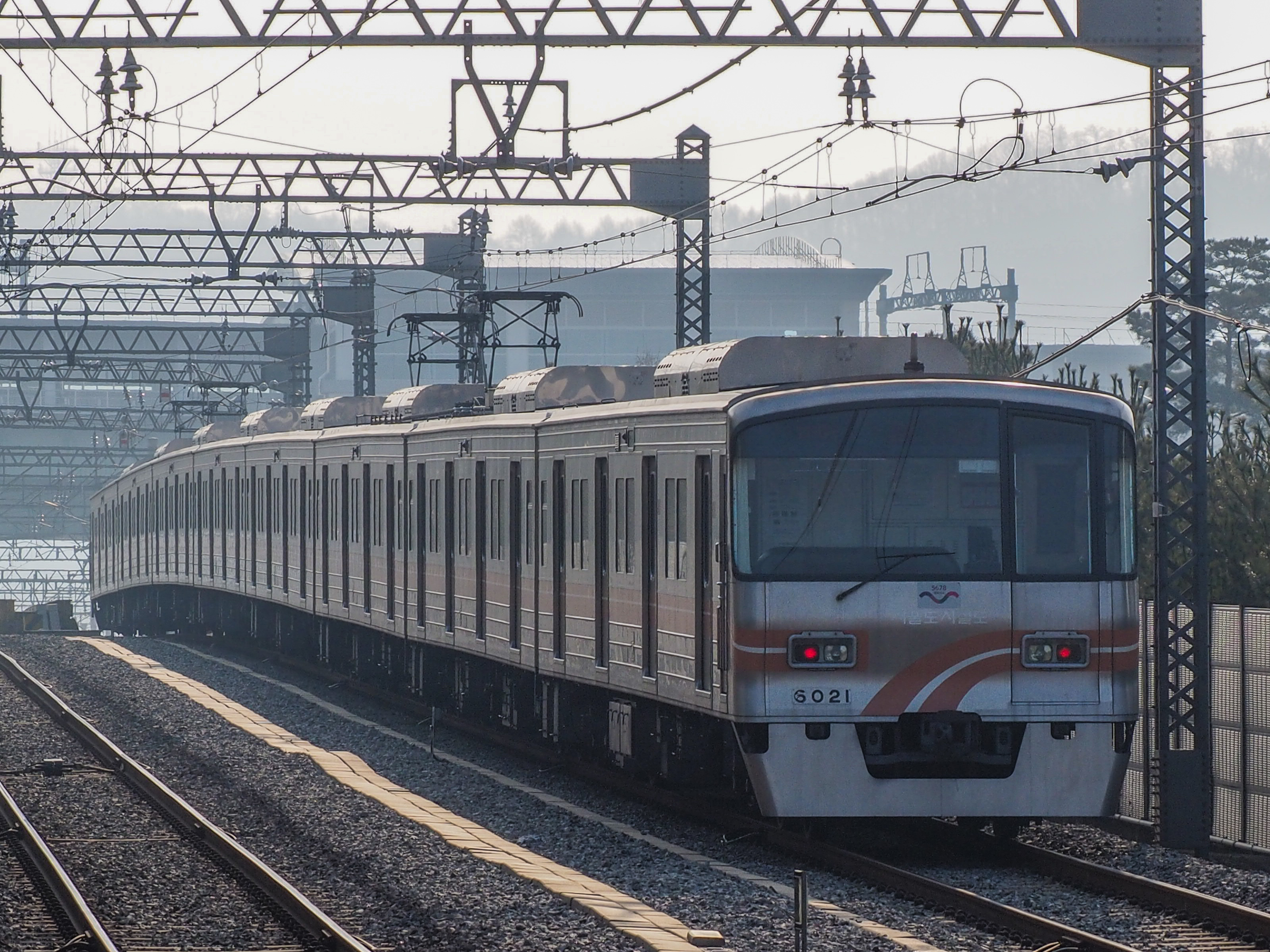
- Seoul Metro 6000 series
- Constructed: 1999 - 2000
- Formation: 8 cars per train Tc-M-M'-T-T-M-M'-Tc
- Operator: Seoul Metro
- Lines served: Seoul Subway Line 6 Seoul Subway Line 7

Specifications
- Maximum speed: 80 km/h (50 mph) (service); 100 km/h (62 mph) (design)
- Power output: 4,000 kW (5,364 hp)
- Deceleration: 3.5 km/(h⋅s) (2.2 mph/s) (service); 4.5 km/(h⋅s) (2.8 mph/s)(emergency)
- Safety systems: ATC, ATO

The Seoul Metro 6000 series is a metro train introduced by the Seoul Transportation Corporation from 1999 to 2000 with the opening of Seoul Subway Line 6. Currently, a total of 39 8-car trains (312 total units) are in operation on Line 6, and an additional 2 8-car trains (16 total units) are in operation on Line 7.

== Generations ==
=== 1st generation (601 ~ 641) ===
These vehicles were introduced in preparation for the opening of the first phase of Seoul Subway Line 6 on August 7, 2000 and the second phase on December 15 of the same year. In the early days of production, it was produced at Hyundai Precision's Changwon plant, but it was produced at the same plant after Hyundai Precision, Daewoo Heavy Industries, and Hanjin Heavy Industries, the nation's top three railway vehicle manufacturers, were integrated into KOROS on July 1, 1999.

== Specifications ==
=== Control ===
The 6000 series uses a IGBT-VVVF 2-level inverter from Mitsubishi, Japan.

Among the vehicles introduced, 609 vehicles were equipped with IGBT-VVVF inverter, which was first locally developed by Hyundai Precision, but the regenerative braking efficiency of the inverter was extremely low and frequently failed, so it was returned to the same VVVF inverter as the existing vehicle in 2005.

=== TCMS ===
The TCMS system developed by Hyundai Precision was adopted. It has been improved from the existing TGIS to form a network with a transmission speed of 2.5 Mbps, and especially for the first time, it has reverse and braking command functions, further enhancing vehicle responsiveness and unifying the control function of service devices suitable for single-seater rides. In addition, various functions such as failure diagnosis function and incoming and forwarding inspection function have been strengthened. This is also compared to the TIMS system employed in Japan's JR East E231 series trains. However, although the network configuration of the TIMS system was a ladder method, it was possible to improve the transmission speed along with the redundancy of the transmission system, but TCMS is configured in a ring method, so redundancy is possible, but the transmission speed is limited.

=== Interior ===
It employs a lightweight door engine manufactured by Eugene Engineering and has two iron pillars installed in the middle of the seven-seater seat.

In the wake of the 2003 Daegu subway fire disaster, the replacement of interior materials for all vehicles was completed by 2005 due to the reinforced internal combustion standards of railway vehicles. The replacement work was carried out by returning it to Hyundai Rotem Uiwang Plant. The seat adopted a matte stainless steel sheet, and the fire alarm and room emergency intercom were reinforced. In particular, the location of the emergency opening and closing cock installed at the top of the existing door was moved to the bottom of the passenger seat, and the location was modified.

Since 2010, flame retardant mottled seats have been installed only in the part (saddle side) except for the backrest, and as part of the SMRT-MALL project, the travel guide LED display installed at the top of the door in the room has been replaced with LCD monitors. In addition, the broadcasting device has been replaced with an integrated set-up, and the side destination displays have not been operated for a while due to the installation of the screen door (PSD), followed by the removal of the side information post and Wi-Fi terminals (SK Telecom, KT, and LG U+).

== Gallery ==
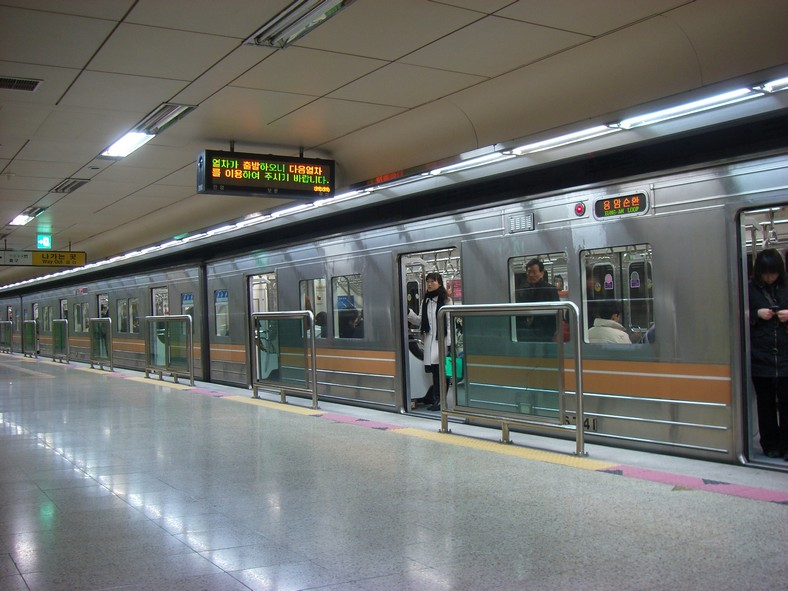
Car body

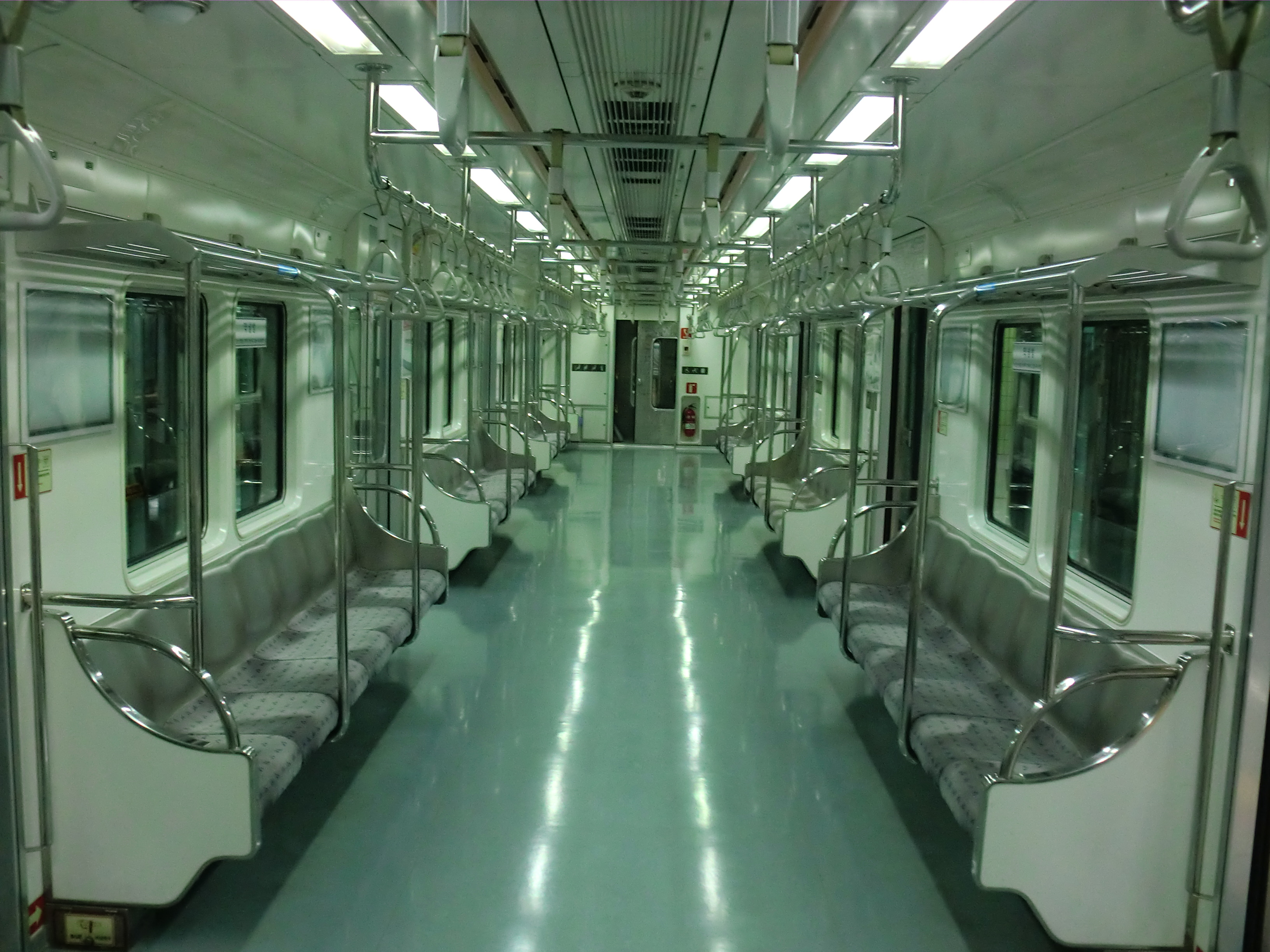
Interior

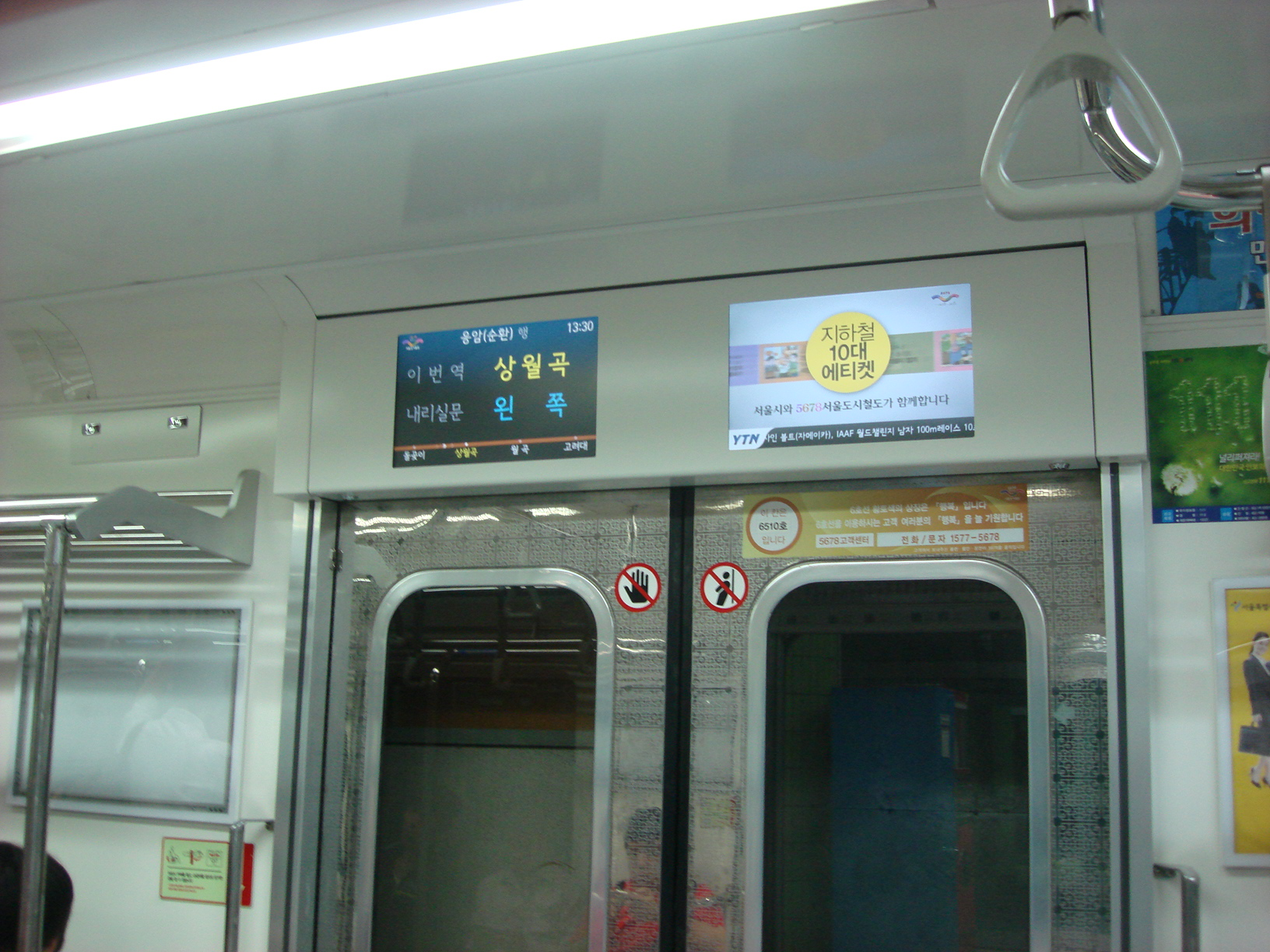
LCD
