= Sinnae station =

Station of the Seoul Metropolitan Subway

신내; Sinnae
신내; Sinnae
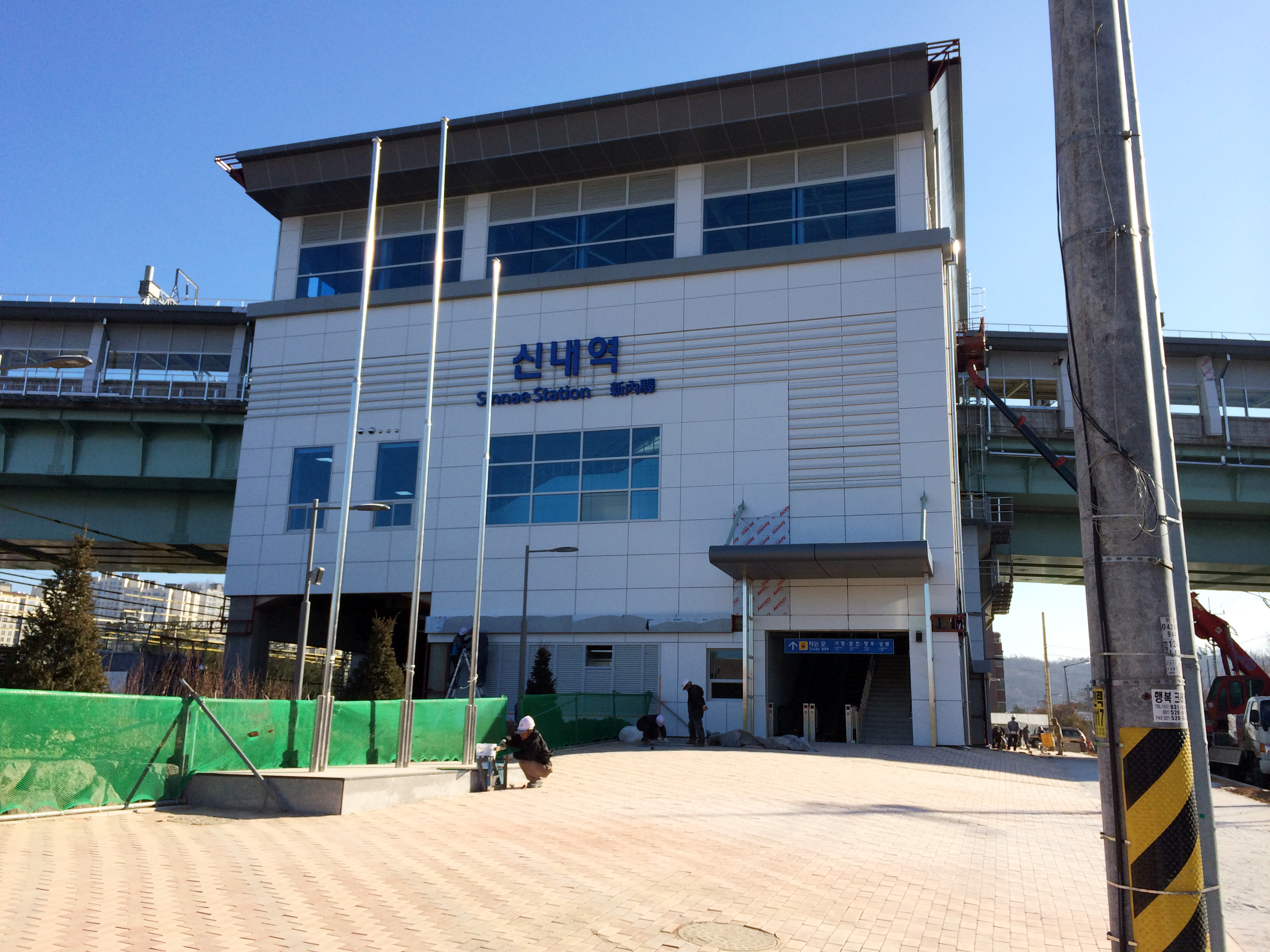
- Station building

Korean name
- Hangul: 신내역
- Hanja: 新內驛
- Revised Romanization: Sinnae-yeok
- McCune–Reischauer: Sinnae-yŏk

General information
- Location: 320-2 Mangu-dong, Jungnang-gu, Seoul
- Coordinates: 37.6129°N 127.1032°E
- Operator: Seoul Metro; Korail
- Lines: Gyeongchun Line; Line 6
- Platforms: 2 (Gyeongchun Line), 1 (Line 6)
- Tracks: 2 (Gyeongchun Line), 1 (Line 6)

Construction
- Structure type: Aboveground

Other information
- Station code: 648 (Line 6); P122 (Gyeongchun Line)

Key dates
- December 28, 2013: Gyeongchun Line opened
- December 21, 2019: Line 6 opened

Services
Preceding station	Seoul Metropolitan Subway	Following station
Bonghwasan towards Eungam	Line 6	Terminus
Mangu towards Cheongnyangni or Kwangwoon University	Gyeongchun Line	Galmae towards Chuncheon
Location

Sinnae station (Korean: 신내역; Hanja: 新內驛) is a railway station on the Gyeongchun Line and Seoul Subway Line 6. The station is located near the Sinnae train depot, which is the depot of Line 6. Line 6 currently only has 1 track and 1 platform, however, in the future, the Line 6 station will be expanded to 2 tracks and 2 platforms. This station is also the first aboveground station on Line 6.

== Station layout ==
L3; Platform level	Side platform, doors will open on the right
L3; Platform level	Westbound	← Line 6 toward Eungam (Bonghwasan)

L2; Platform level	Side platform, doors will open on the left
L2; Platform level	Eastbound	Gyeongchun Line toward Chuncheon (Galmae) →
L2; Platform level	Westbound	← Gyeongchun Line toward Cheongnyangni or Kwangwoon Univ. (Mangu)

L1; Concourse	Lobby	Customer Service, Shops, Vending machines, ATMs

G	Street level	Exit

== Gallery ==
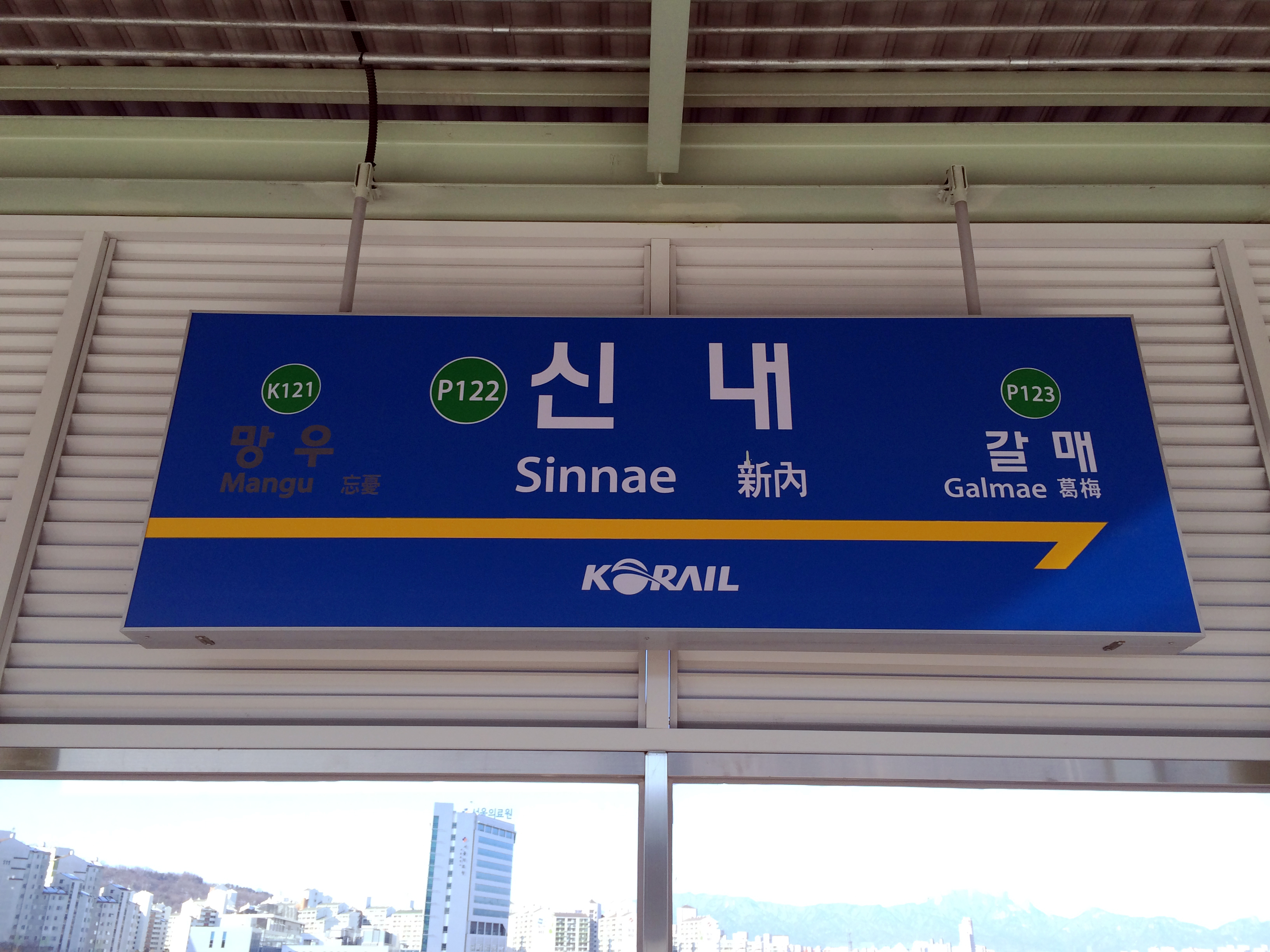
Station sign (Gyeongchun Line)

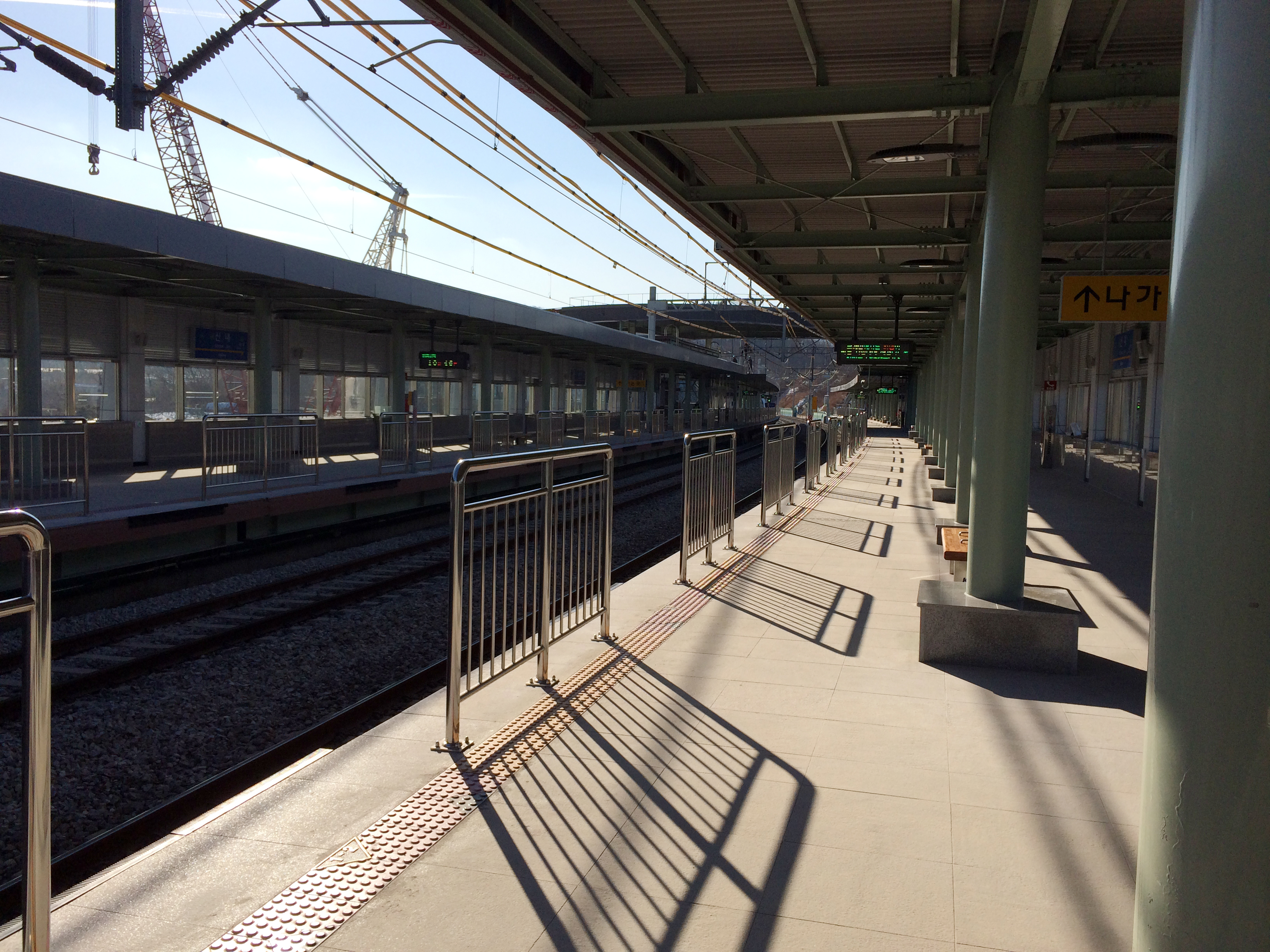
Platform (Gyeongchun Line)

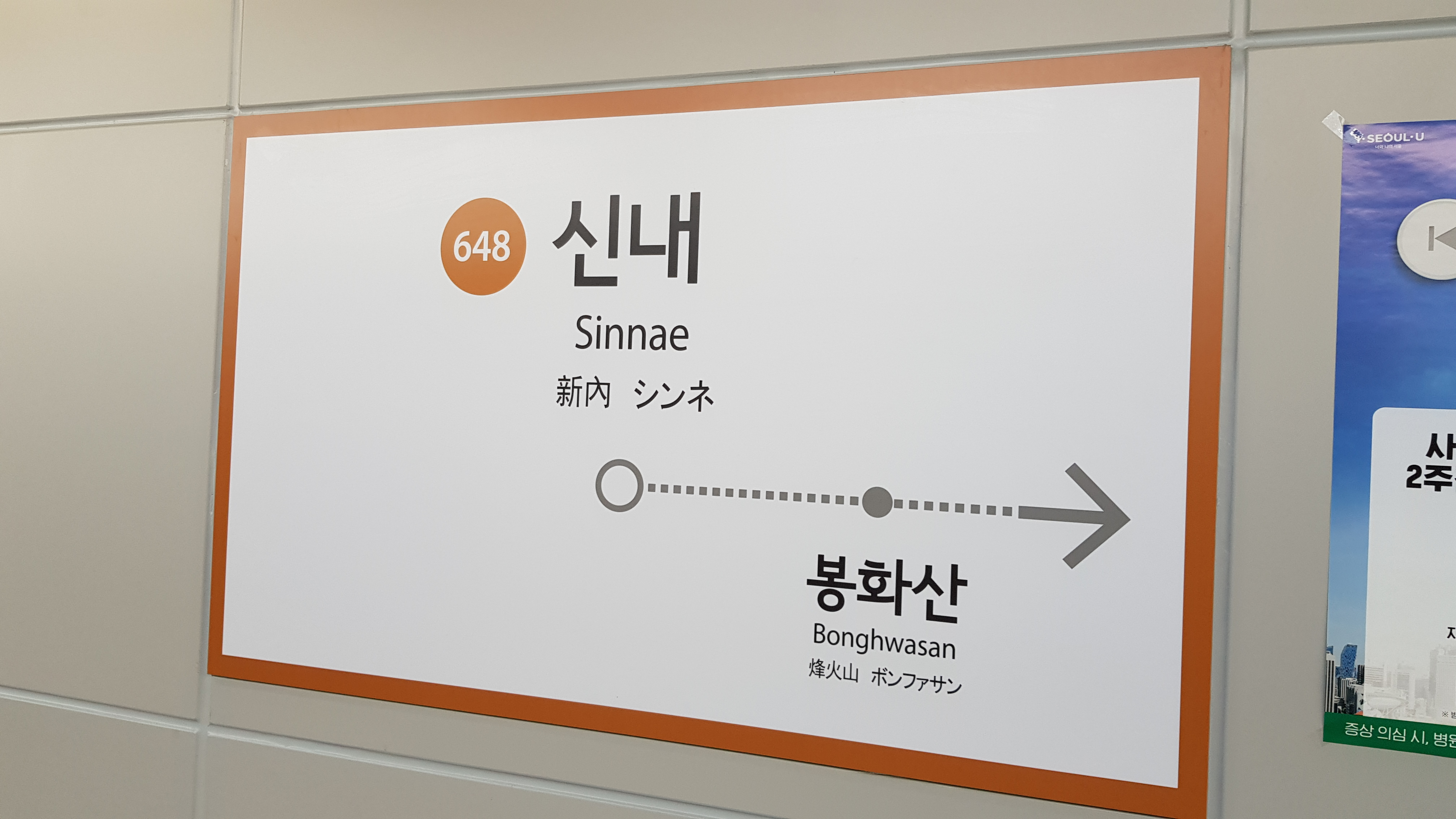
Station sign (Line 6)

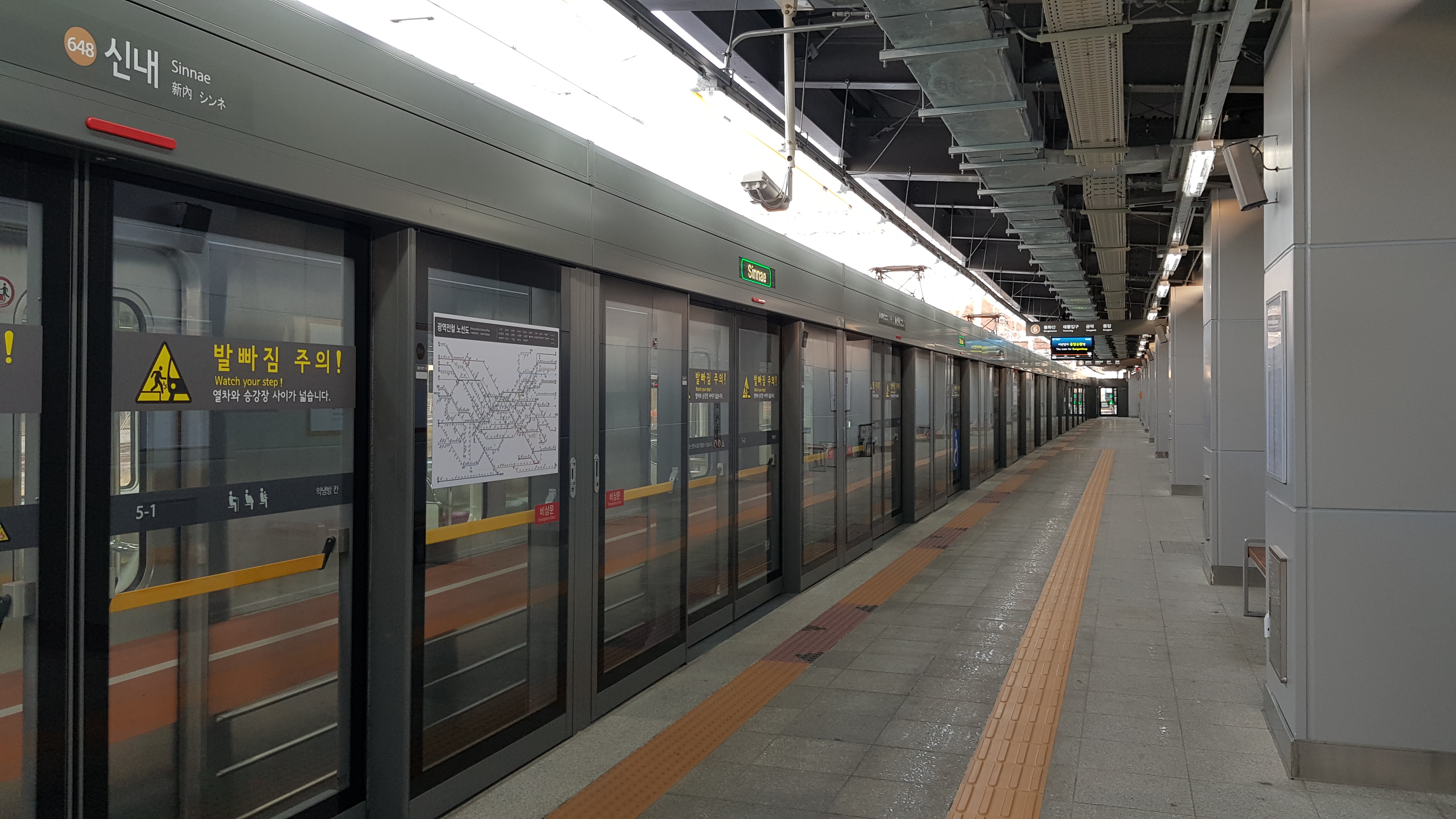
Platform (Line 6)
