= Eungam station =

Subway station in Eunpyeong, Seoul, South Korea

응암; Eungam
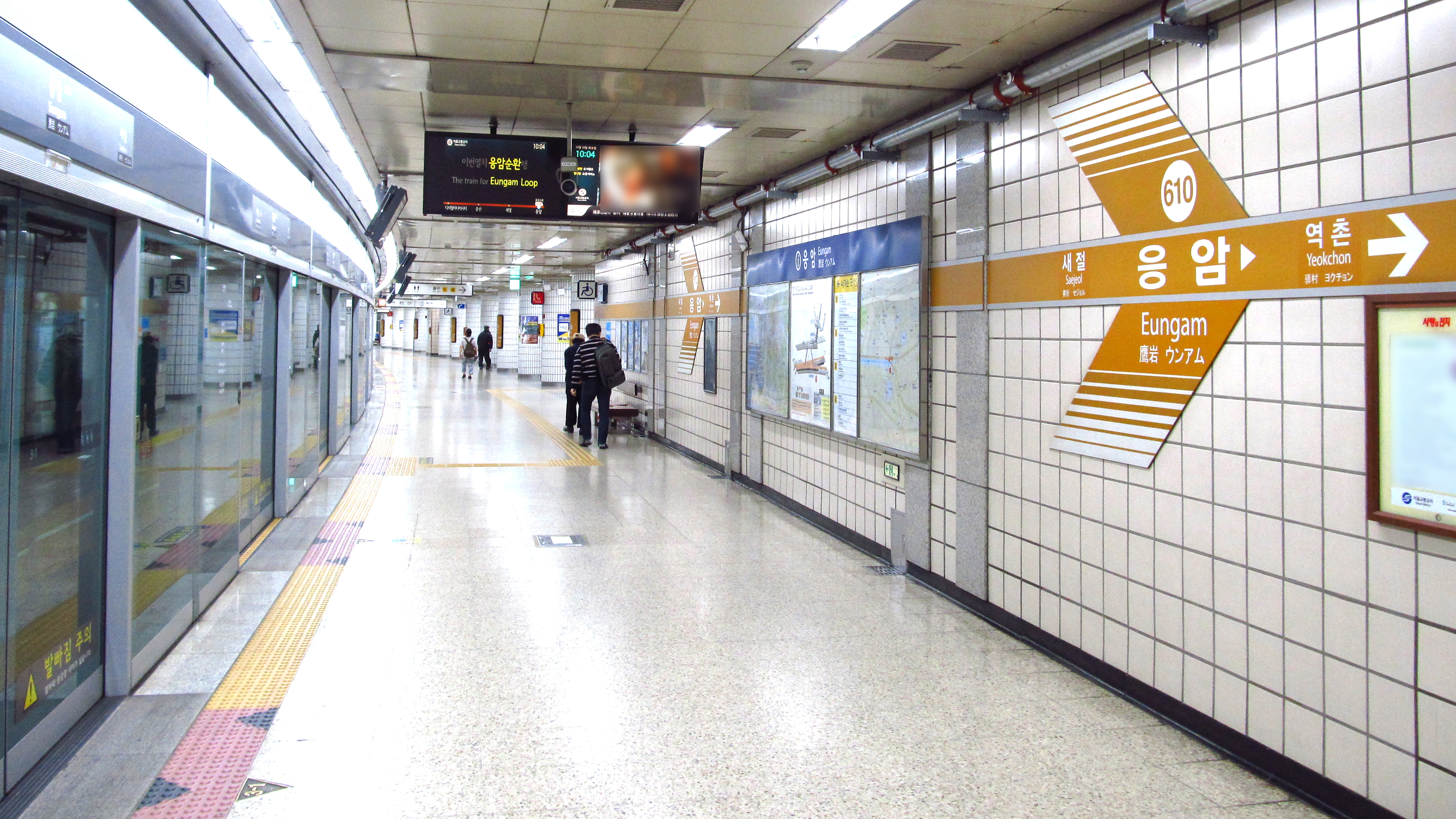

Korean name
- Hangul: 응암역
- Hanja: 鷹岩驛
- Revised Romanization: Eungam-yeok
- McCune–Reischauer: Ŭngam-yŏk

General information
- Location: 85-41 Yeokchon-dong, 477 Jeungsanno Jiha, Eunpyeong-gu, Seoul
- Coordinates: 37°35′54″N 126°54′56″E
- Operator: Seoul Metro
- Line: Line 6
- Platforms: 1
- Tracks: 2

Construction
- Structure type: Underground

History
- Opened: 15 December 2000
Services
Preceding station	Seoul Metropolitan Subway	Following station
Yeokchon towards Sinnae via Dokbawi	Line 6	Saejeol towards Sinnae
Gusan One-way operation	Line 6	Saejeol towards Sinnae
Location

Eungam is a station on Line 6 of the Seoul Metropolitan Subway. The station serves as the western terminus of Line 6 and is in the Yeokchon neighborhood of the Eunpyeong District of Seoul. Travel time between Eungam Station and Bonghwasan Station, the eastern terminus of Line 6, is approximately 57 minutes.

== Station layout ==
The station acts as the prelude to the Eungam Loop for trains coming from Sinnae, so it has a platform shaped like a backwards Y, with its Yeokchon-bound side being curved close to the north end, while the Saejeol-bound side is straight due to that side providing service for trains from Gusan.

G	Street level	Exit

L1; Concourse	Lobby	Customer Service, Shops, Vending machines, ATMs

L2; Platform level	Westbound	← Line 6 toward Sinnae via loop (Yeokchon)
L2; Platform level	Island platform, doors will open on the left
L2; Platform level	Eastbound	Line 6 toward Sinnae (Saejeol) → (No service from westbound: Gusan)

== Vicinity ==
- Sinsa ogeori (5-way junction)
- Eunpyeong-gu Office

== Gallery ==
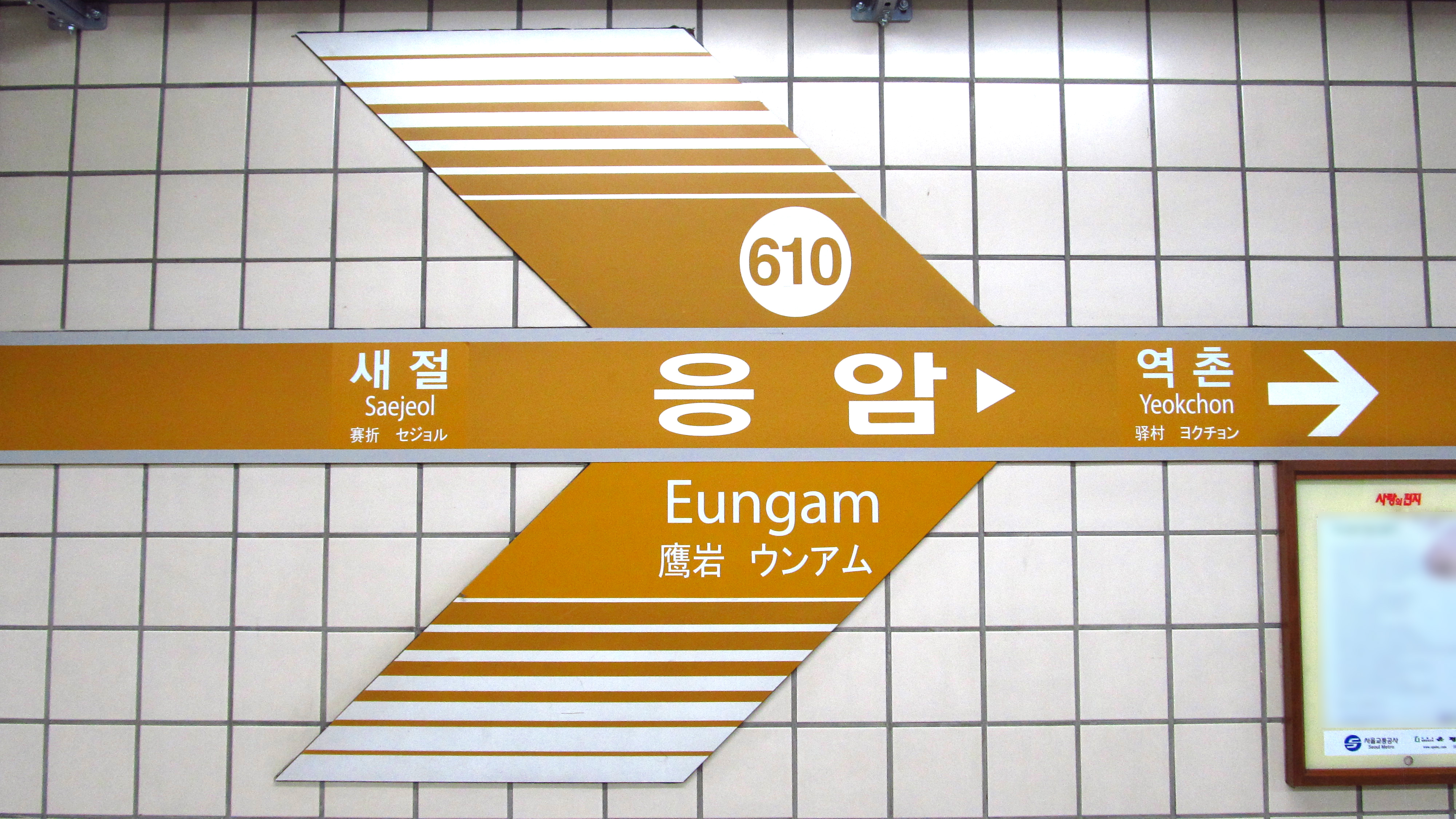
Station sign on wall

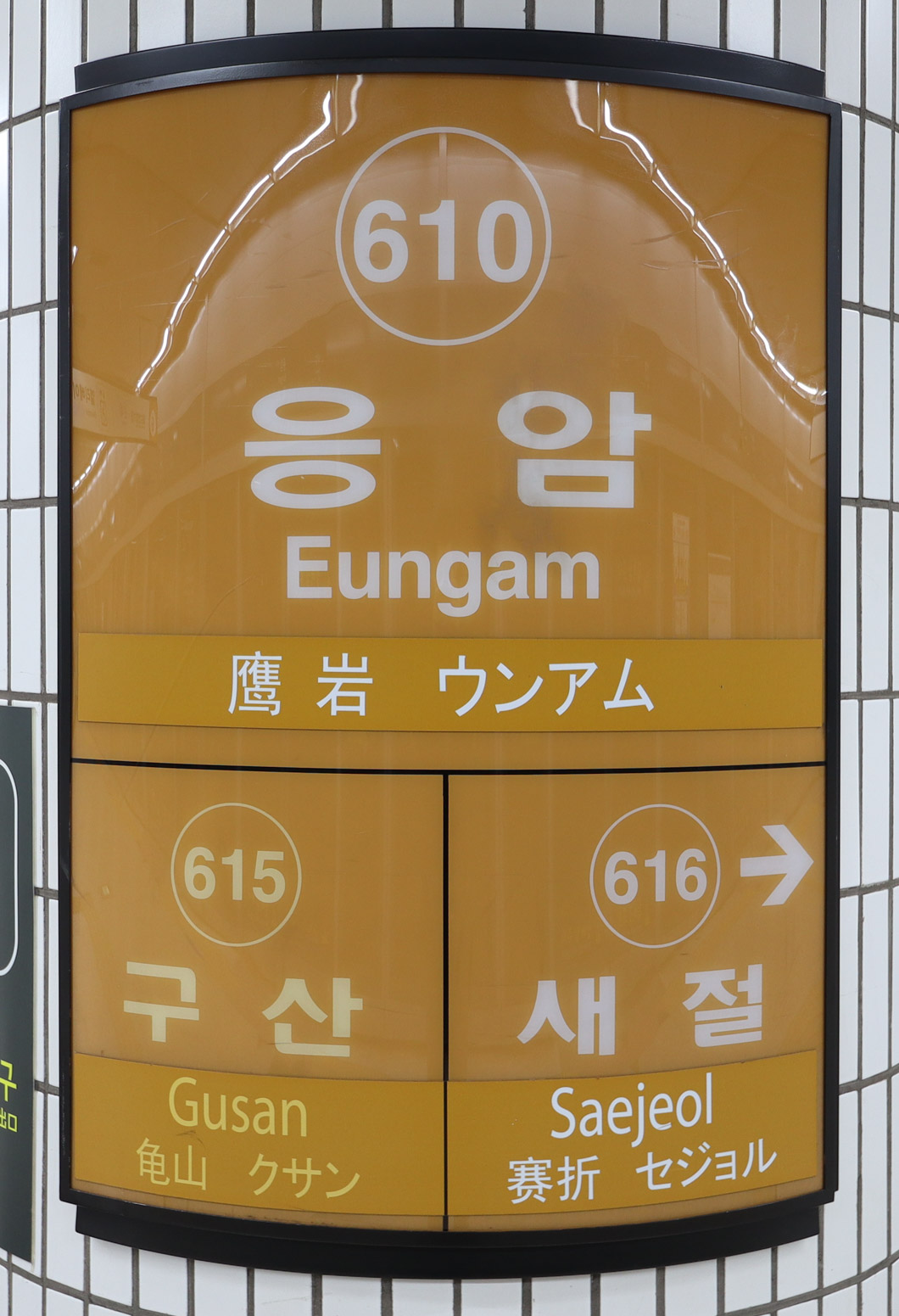
Station sign on pillar

== Station Peripheral Information ==
If you go out from Exit 4, there is Bulgwangcheon Stream, and along Bulgwangcheon Stream, the park along the stream extends from here to the Han River.

If you go out to exit 3, there is E-Mart Eunpyeong branch.

If you move from Eungam Station to E-Mart, there is a coffee shop area.

Seoul Christian University is located about 500m away from Exit 2.
