= Yeokchon station =

Station of the Seoul Metropolitan Subway

역촌; Yeokchon
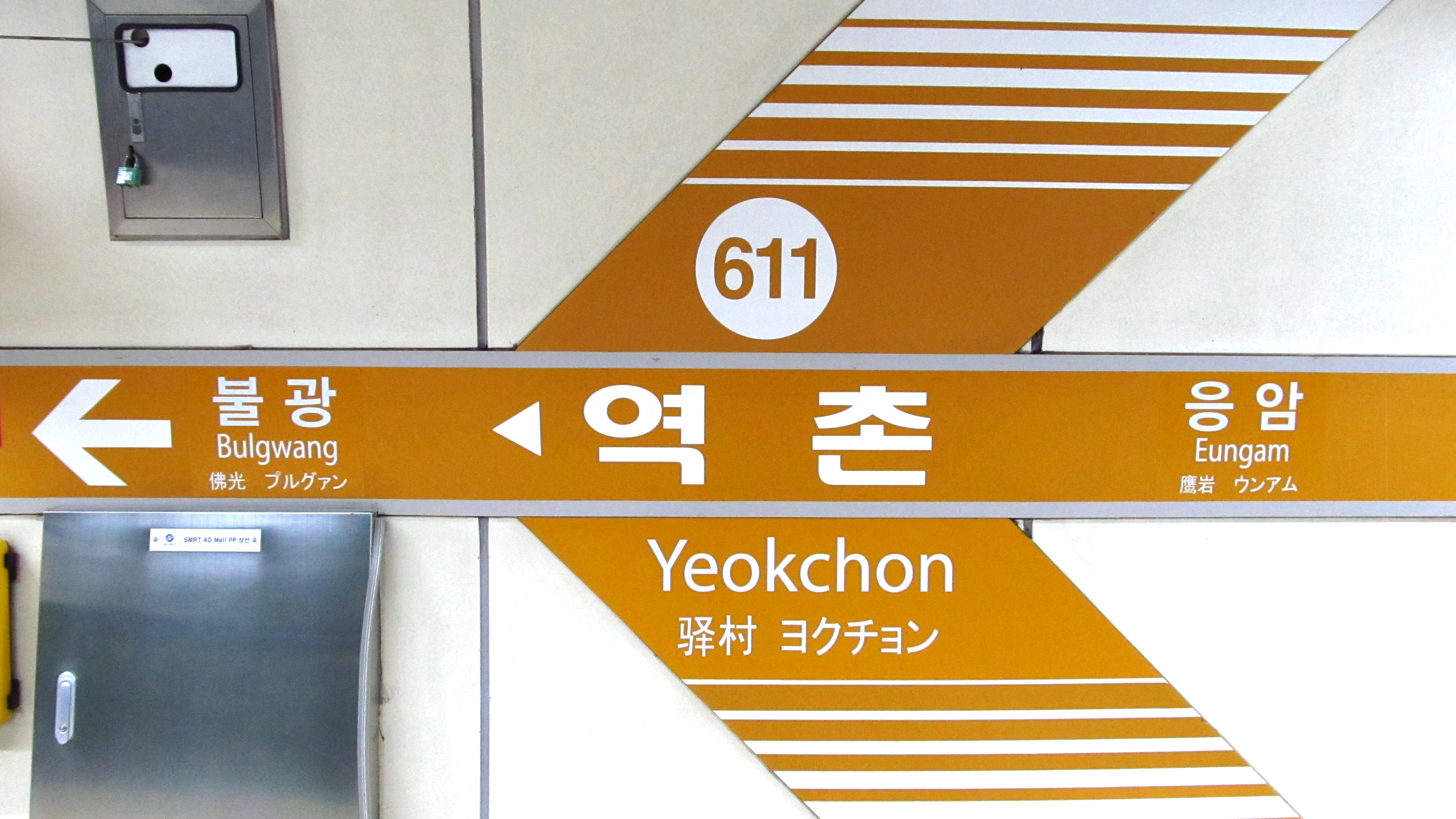

Korean name
- Hangul: 역촌역
- Hanja: 驛村驛
- Revised Romanization: Yeokchonnyeok
- McCune–Reischauer: Yŏkch'onnyŏk

General information
- Location: 144-69 Nokbeon-dong, 63 Seooreungno Jiha, Eunpyeong-gu, Seoul
- Coordinates: 37°36′22″N 126°55′22″E
- Operator: Seoul Metro
- Line: Line 6
- Platforms: 1
- Tracks: 1

Construction
- Structure type: Underground

History
- Opened: December 15, 2000

Services
Preceding station	Seoul Metropolitan Subway	Following station
Bulgwang towards Sinnae via Dokbawi	Line 6	Eungam One-way operation
Location

Yeokchon Station is a railway station on Line 6 of the Seoul Subway. It is part of a one-way section of Line 6 known as the Eungam Loop.

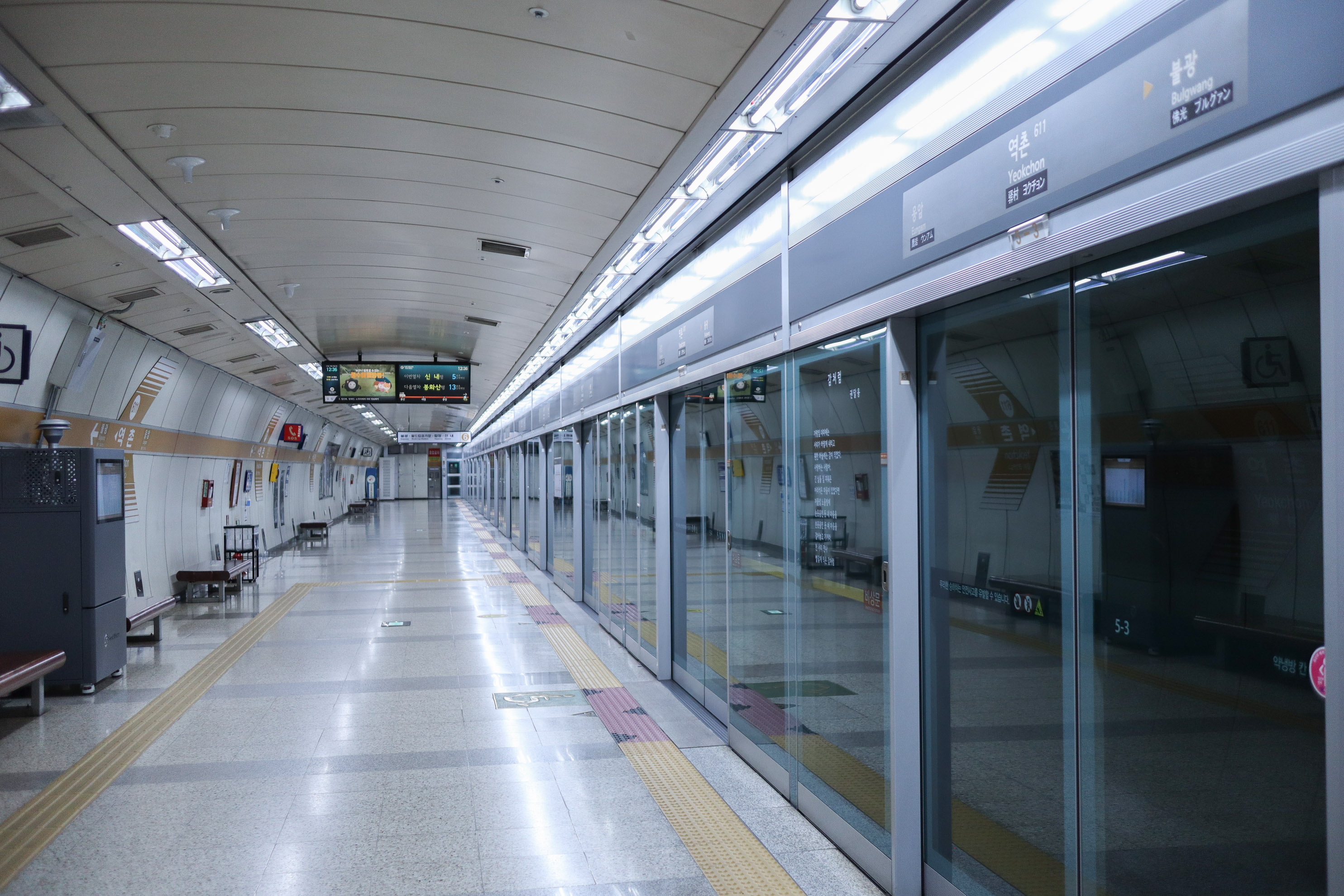
The station's platform

== Station layout ==
G	Street level	Exit

L1; Concourse	Lobby	Customer Service, Shops, Vending machines, ATMs

L2; Platform level	Side platform, doors will open on the right
L2; Platform level	Single track	← Line 6 toward Sinnae via loop (Bulgwang) (No service: Eungam)

== Exits ==
- Exit 3 : Eunpyeong District Office
- Exit 4 : Eunpyeong Post Office
