= Nokbeon station =

Train station in South Korea

녹번; Nokbeon
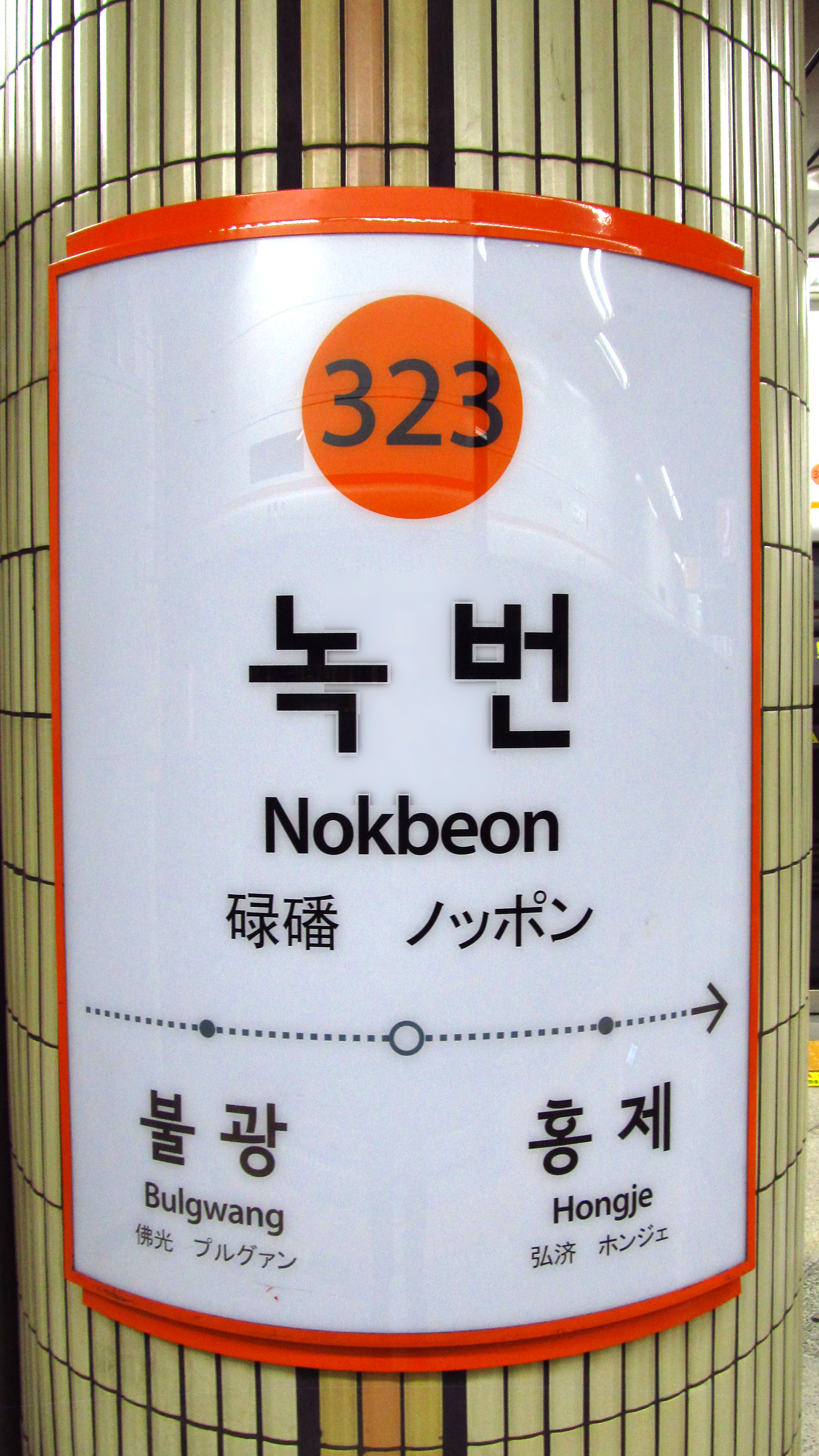

Korean name
- Hangul: 녹번역
- Hanja: 碌磻驛
- Revised Romanization: Nokbeonnyeok
- McCune–Reischauer: Nokpŏnnyŏk

General information
- Location: 55 Nokbeon-dong, 602-1 Tongillo Jiha, Eunpyeong-gu, Seoul
- Coordinates: 37°36′03″N 126°56′09″E
- Operated by: Seoul Metro
- Line(s): Line 3
- Platforms: 1
- Tracks: 2

Construction
- Structure type: Underground

Key dates
- July 12, 1985: Line 3 opened

Passengers
- (Daily) Based on Jan-Dec of 2012. Line 3: 30,785

Nokbeon Station is a station on Seoul Subway Line 3 in Eunpyeong-gu, Seoul.

== Station layout ==
G	Street level	Exit

L1; Concourse	Lobby	Customer Service, Shops, Vending machines, ATMs

L2; Platform	Northbound	← Line 3 toward Daehwa (Bulgwang)
L2; Platform	Island platform, doors will open on the left
L2; Platform	Southbound	Line 3 toward Ogeum (Hongje) →

Preceding station	Seoul Metropolitan Subway	Following station
Bulgwang towards Daehwa	Line 3	Hongje towards Ogeum
