= Bulgwang station =

Station of the Seoul Metropolitan Subway

불광; Bulgwang
불광; Bulgwang
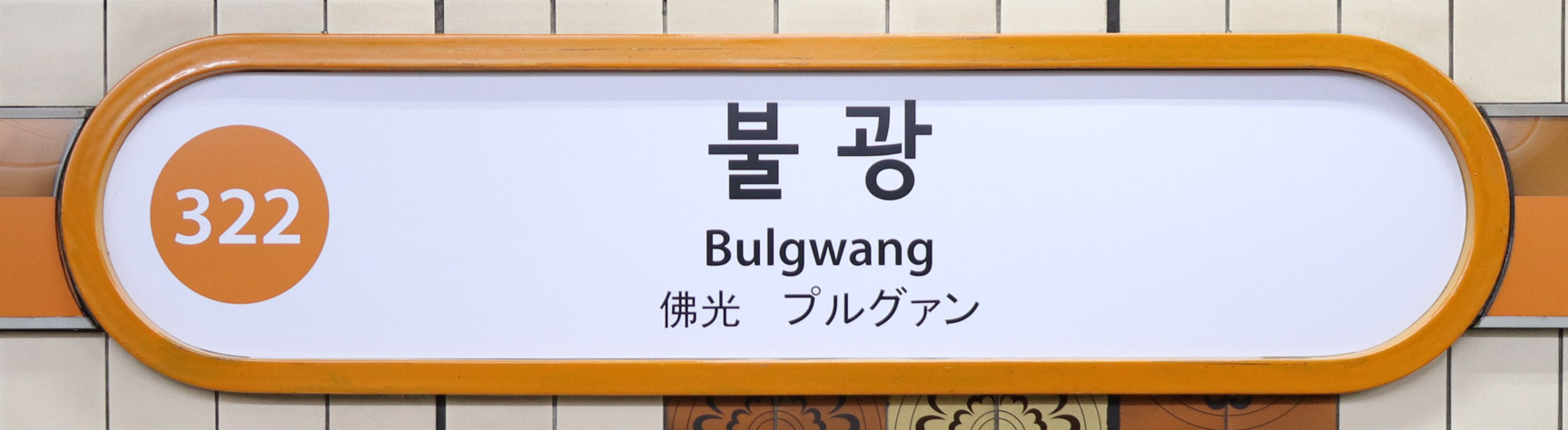
- Station nameplate (Line 3)

Korean name
- Hangul: 불광역
- Hanja: 佛光驛
- Revised Romanization: Bulgwangnyeok
- McCune–Reischauer: Pulgwangnyŏk

General information
- Location: 13-10 Daejo-dong, 723-1 Tongillo Jiha, Eunpyeong-gu, Seoul
- Coordinates: 37°36′39″N 126°55′46″E
- Operator: Seoul Metro
- Lines: Line 3 Line 6
- Platforms: 3
- Tracks: 3

Construction
- Structure type: Underground

Key dates
- July 12, 1985: Line 3 opened
- December 15, 2000: Line 6 opened

Services
Preceding station	Seoul Metropolitan Subway	Following station
Yeonsinnae towards Daehwa	Line 3	Nokbeon towards Ogeum
Dokbawi towards Sinnae via Yeonsinnae	Line 6	Yeokchon One-way operation
Location

Bulgwang Station is a subway station located in Eunpyeong District, which is a district in Seoul, South Korea. This station is on the Seoul Subway Line 3 and Line 6.

The station is located on the one-way Eungam Loop of Line 6, and therefore the trains from the Line 6 Bulgwang station only run in the direction of Dokbawi Station.

== Station layout ==
G	Street level	Exit

L1; Concourse	Lobby	Customer Service, Shops, Vending machines, ATMs

L2; Platforms	Side platform, doors will open on the right
L2; Platforms	Northbound	← Line 3 toward Daehwa (Yeonsinnae)
L2; Platforms	Southbound	Line 3 toward Ogeum (Nokbeon) →
L2; Platforms	Side platform, doors will open on the right

L3; Line 6 platform	Side platform, doors will open on the left
L3; Line 6 platform	Single track	Line 6 toward Sinnae via loop (Dokbawi) → (No service: Yeokchon)

== Station Peripheral Information ==
There are NC Department Store Bulgwang Branch, and CGV Bulgwang is located. Right across the street is Daejo Market.

== Gallery ==
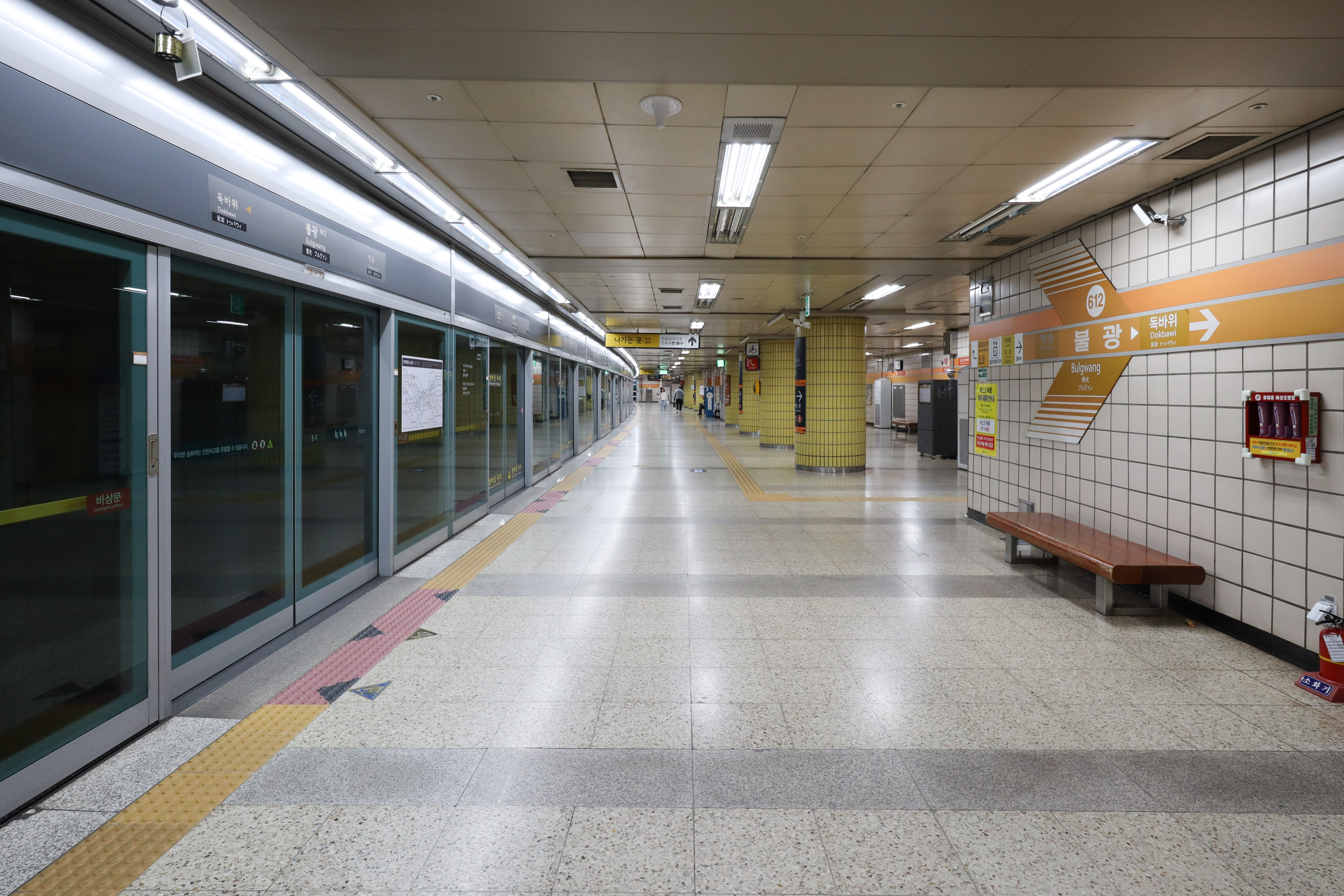
Line 6 platform

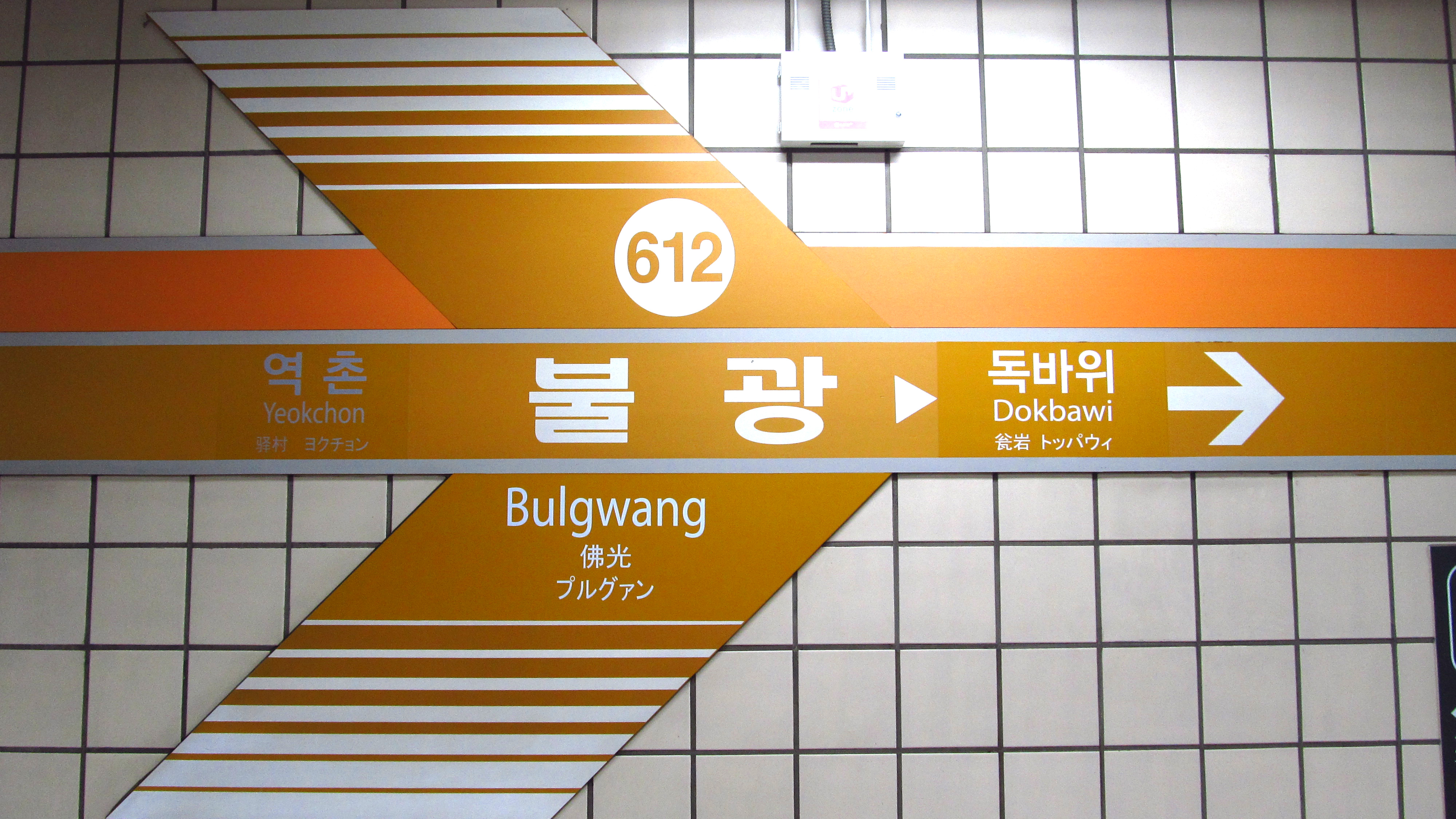
Station nameplate (Line 6)
