= Sinsa-dong =

Sinsa-dong may refer to:

- Sinsa-dong, Gangnam, Gangnam District, Seoul
- Sinsa-dong, Gwanak, Gwanak District, Seoul
- Sinsa-dong, Eunpyeong, Eunpyeong District, Seoul
