= Kim Mi-gyeong =

Kim Mi-gyeong or Kim Mi-gyŏng may refer to:

- Kim Mi-kyung (born 1963), South Korean actress
- Kim Mi-kyung (born 1965), South Korean actress
- Kim Mi-kyung (politician) (born 1965), South Korean politician based in Eunpyeong District
- Kim Mi-gyeong (athlete) (born 1967), South Korean long-distance runner
- Kim Mi-gyong (born 1991), North Korean long-distance runner
- Mi-Kyung Kim (died 1993), one of the victims of the racially motivated 1993 Long Island Rail Road shooting
