= Yeonsinnae station =

Station of the Seoul Metropolitan Subway

| 연신내; Yeonsinnae |
| 연신내; Yeonsinnae |
| 연신내; Yeonsinnae |
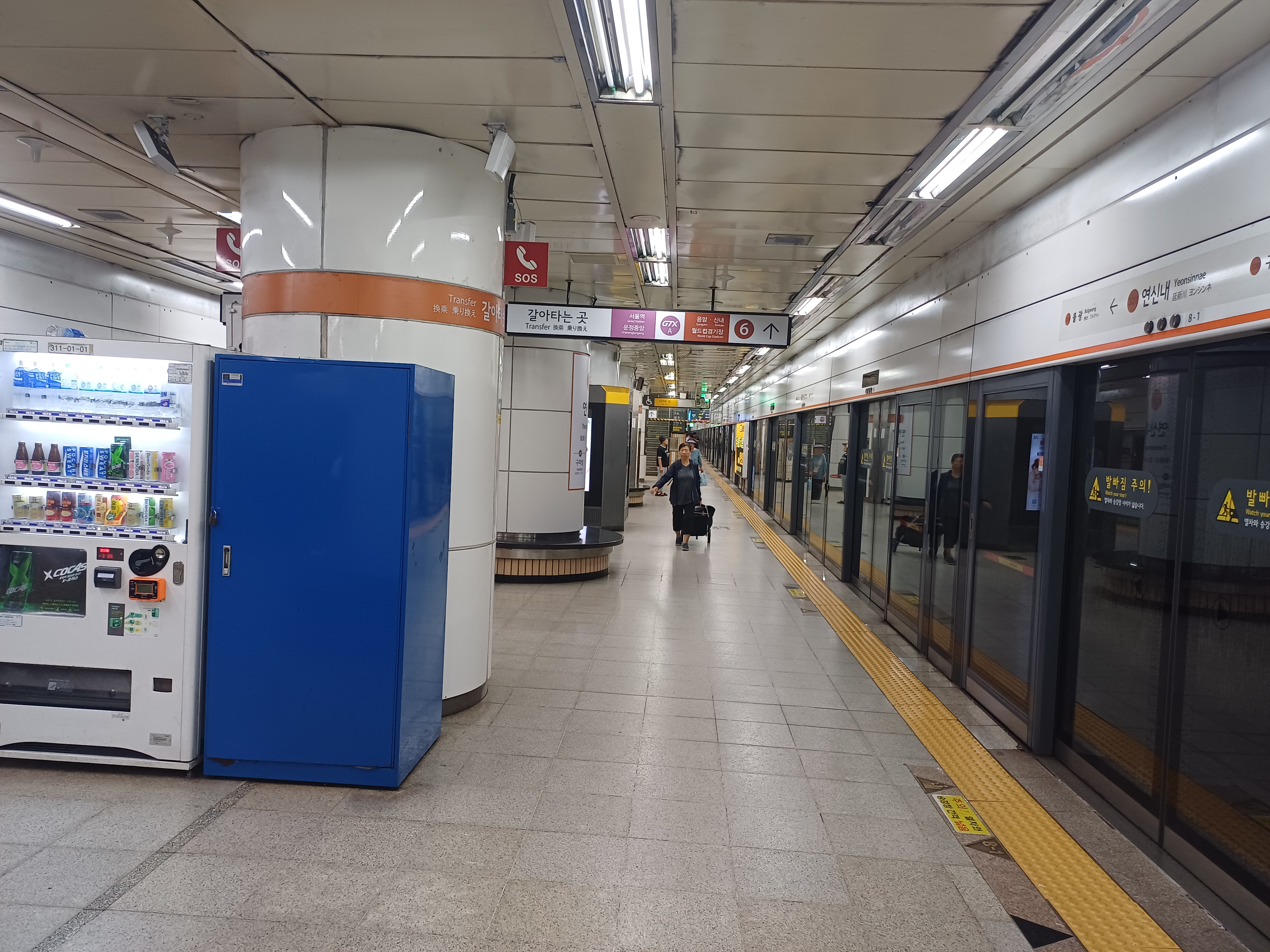
- Line 3 platform

Korean name
- Hangul: 연신내역
- Hanja: 연신내驛
- Revised Romanization: Yeonsinnae-yeok
- McCune–Reischauer: Yŏnsinnae-yŏk

General information
- Location: 487-2 Bulgwang-dong, 849 Tongillo Jiha, Eunpyeong-gu, Seoul
- Coordinates: 37°37′08″N 126°55′17″E
- Operator: Seoul Metro; GTX-A Operation
- Lines: Line 3 Line 6 GTX-A
- Platforms: 3
- Tracks: 3

Construction
- Structure type: Underground

Key dates
- July 12, 1985: Line 3 opened
- December 15, 2000: Line 6 opened
- December 28, 2024: GTX-A opened

Services
| Preceding station | Seoul Metropolitan Subway | Following station |
|---|---|---|
| Gupabal towards Daehwa | Line 3 | Bulgwang towards Ogeum |
| Dokbawi One-way operation | Line 6 | Gusan towards Sinnae |
| Daegok towards Unjeongjungang | GTX-A | Seoul Station Terminus |
Location

Yeonsinnae station is a station on Seoul Subway Line 3, Seoul Subway Line 6 and GTX-A, on the northwest side of Seoul in the urban area of Eunpyeong-gu. Although Yeonsinnae Station had a corresponding hanja name (延新內), this name was deemed incorrect and dropped in May 2001.

The station is located on the one-way Eungam Loop of Line 6, and therefore the trains from the Line 6 Yeonsinnae station only run in the direction of Bonghwasan station.

Platform 3 is an island-style platform with two front and one front. Platform 6 is an open-line platform with one front-side platforms. Screen doors are installed at both stations. There are seven exits.

Effective December 28, 2024, the platforms for the GTX-A higher speed commuter rail line began operation.

== Station layout ==
| G | Street level | Exit |

| L1; Concourse | Lobby | Customer Service, Shops, Vending machines, ATMs |

| L2; Line 3 platform | Northbound | ← Line 3 toward Daehwa (Gupabal) |
| L2; Line 3 platform | Island platform, doors will open on the left |
| L2; Line 3 platform | Southbound | Line 3 toward Ogeum (Bulgwang) → |

| L3; Line 6 platform | Side platform, doors will open on the right |
| L3; Line 6 platform | Single track | ← Line 6 toward Sinnae via loop (Gusan) (No service: Dokbawi) |

Transfer

It is appropriate to use Yeonsin Station when transferring to Line 3 → Line 6 or Line 6 → Line 3 (passengers departing from Dokbawi Station only).

== Gallery ==
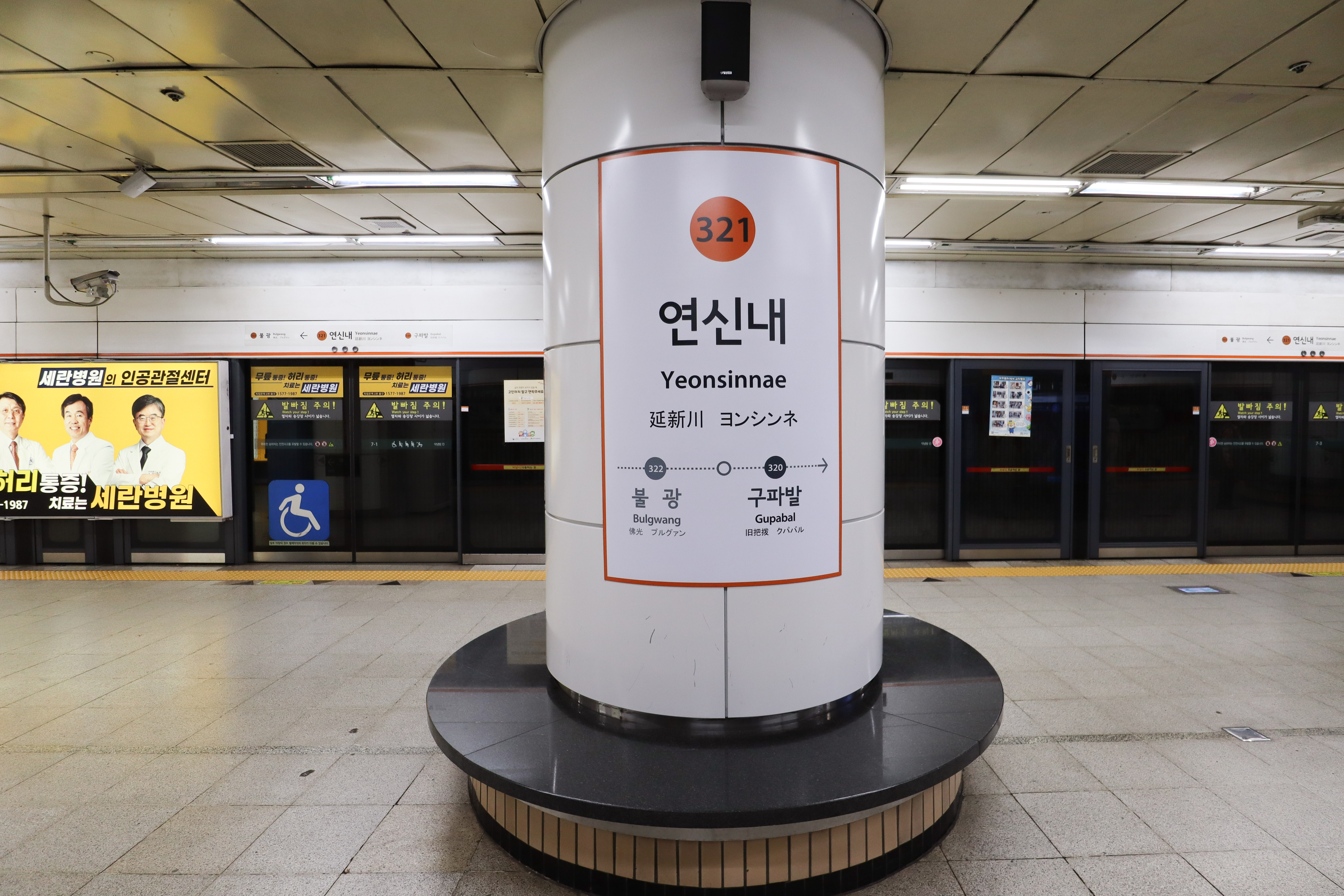
Line 3 station nameplate

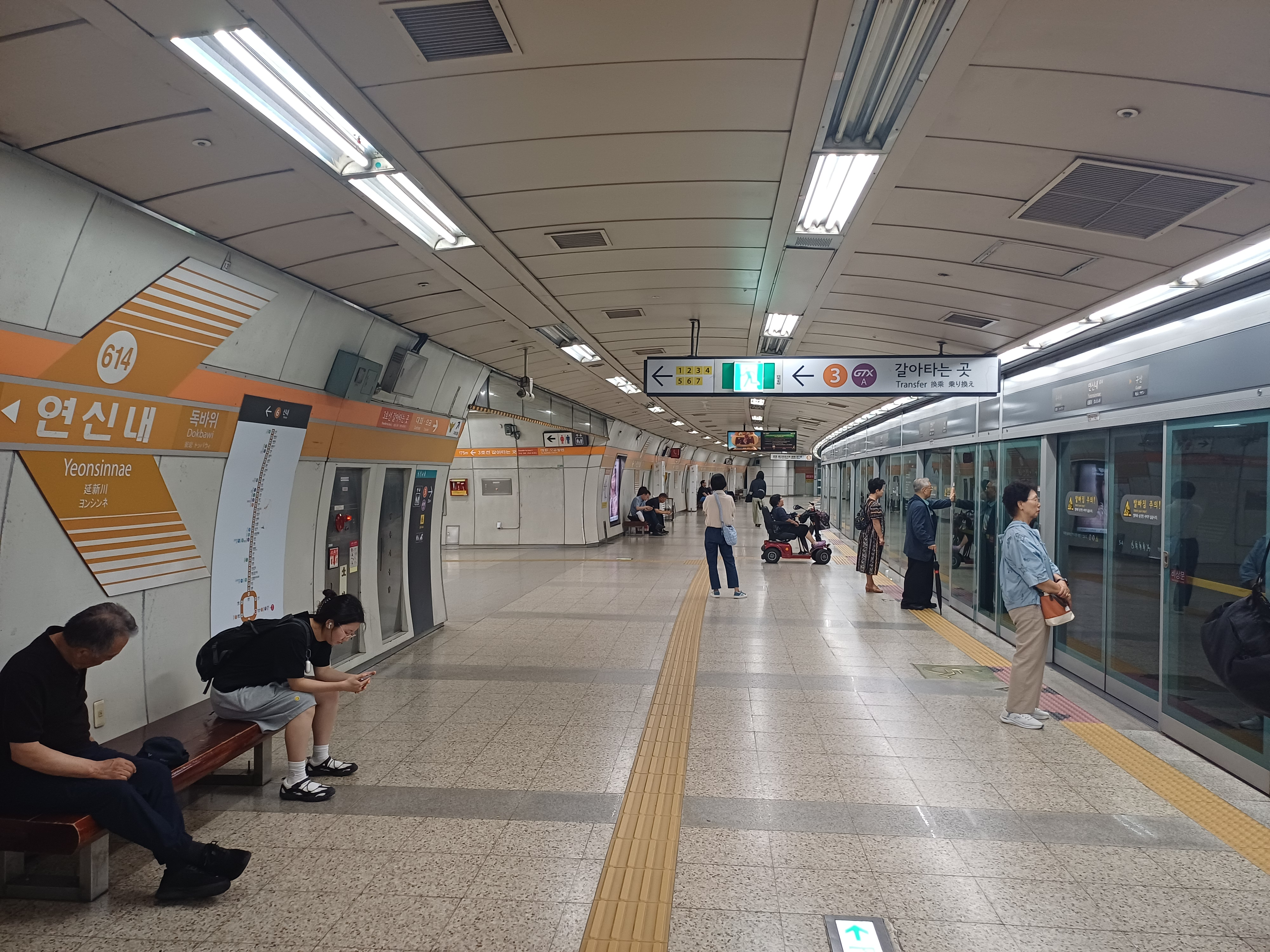
Line 6 platform

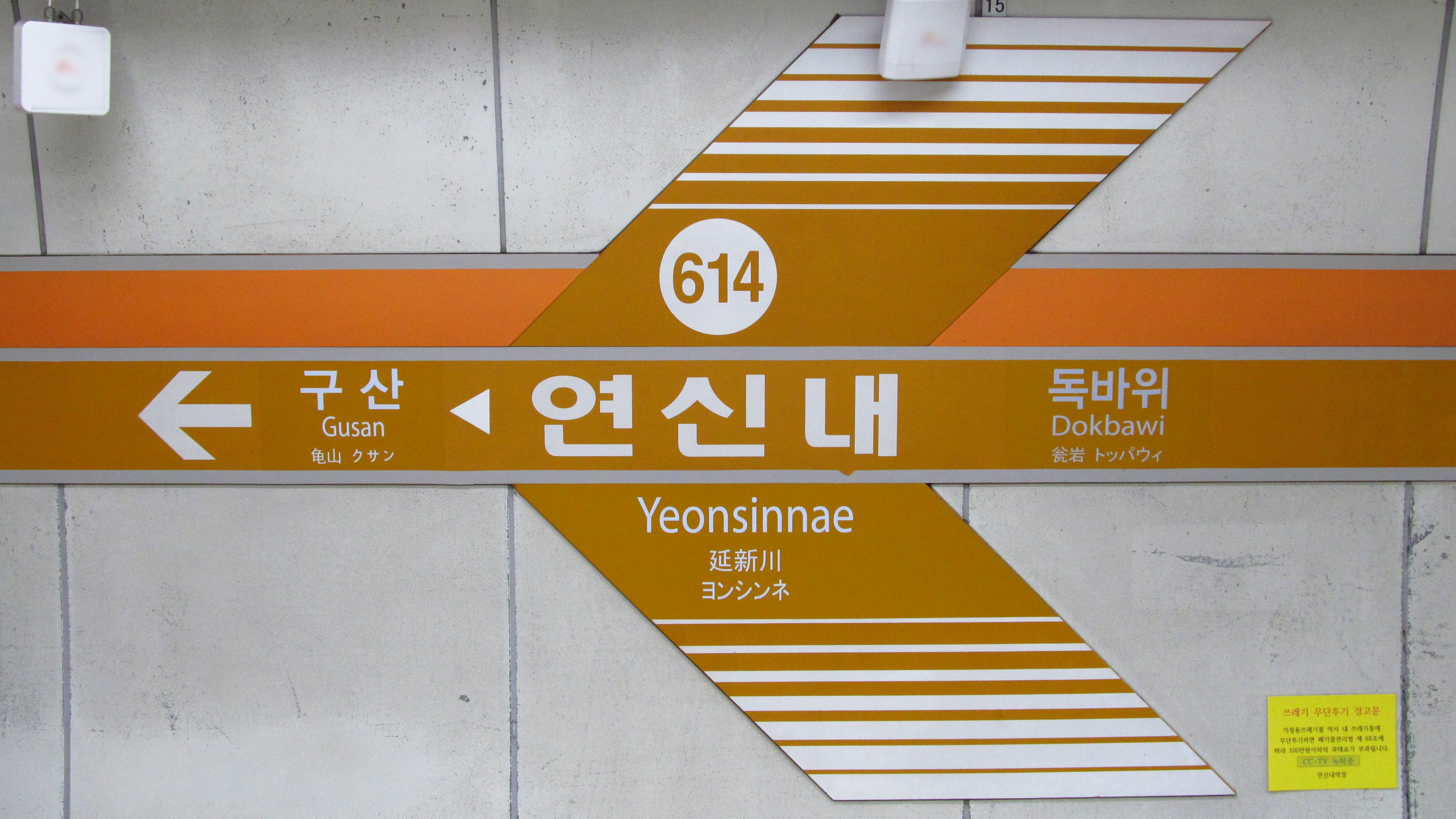
Line 6 station nameplate

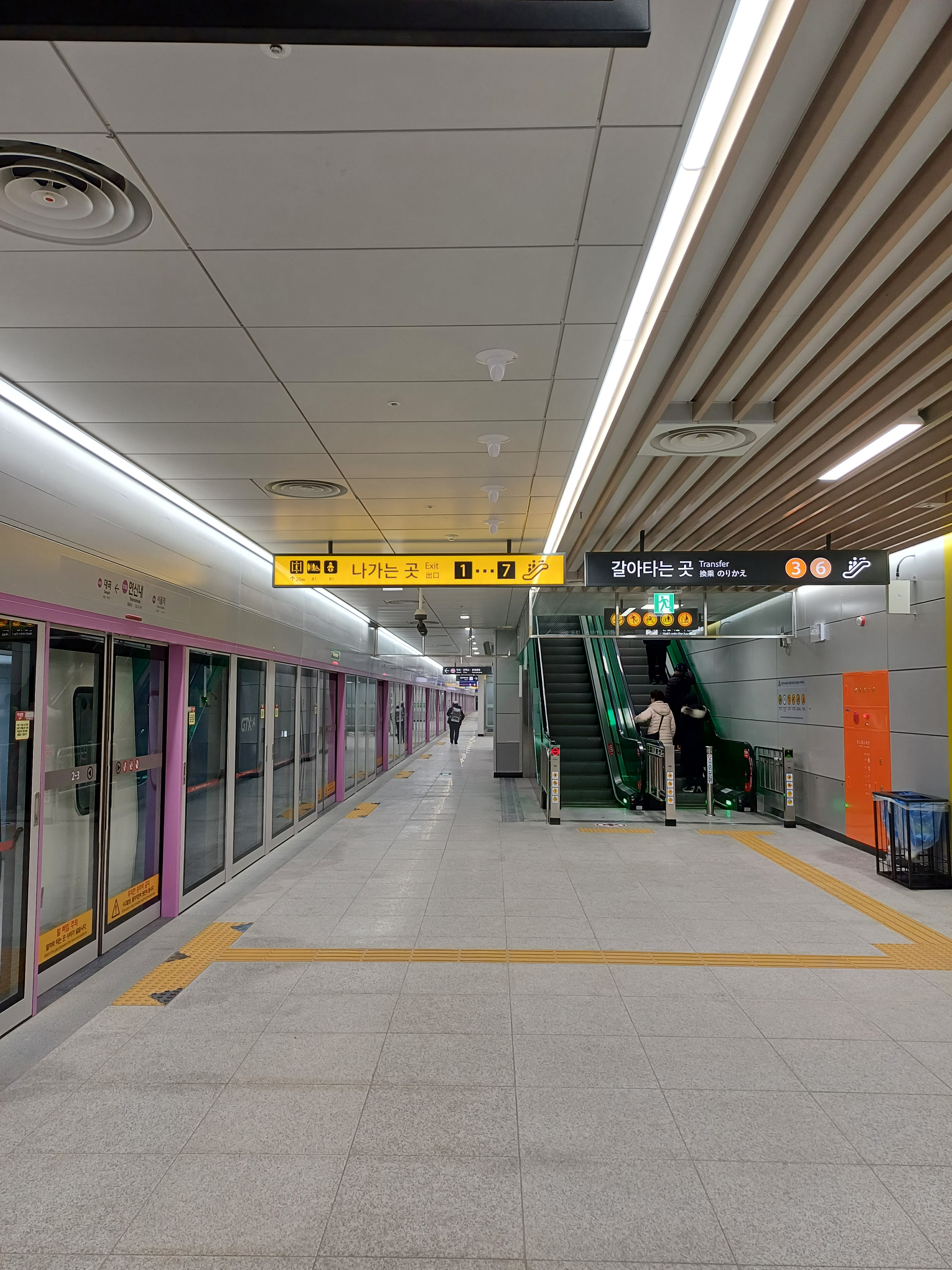
GTX-A platform

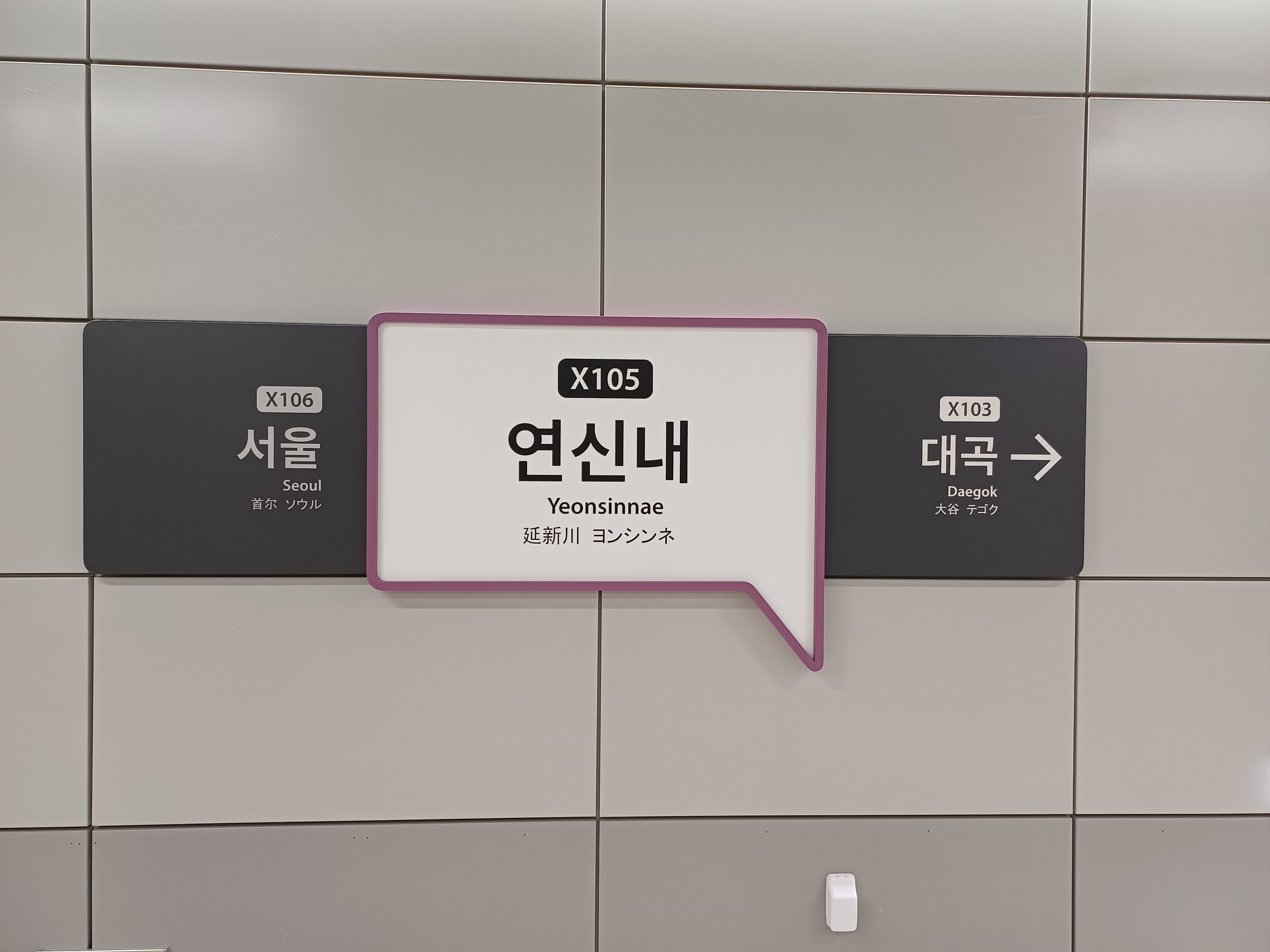
GTX-A station nameplate
