= Gusan station =

Train station in South Korea

구산; Gusan
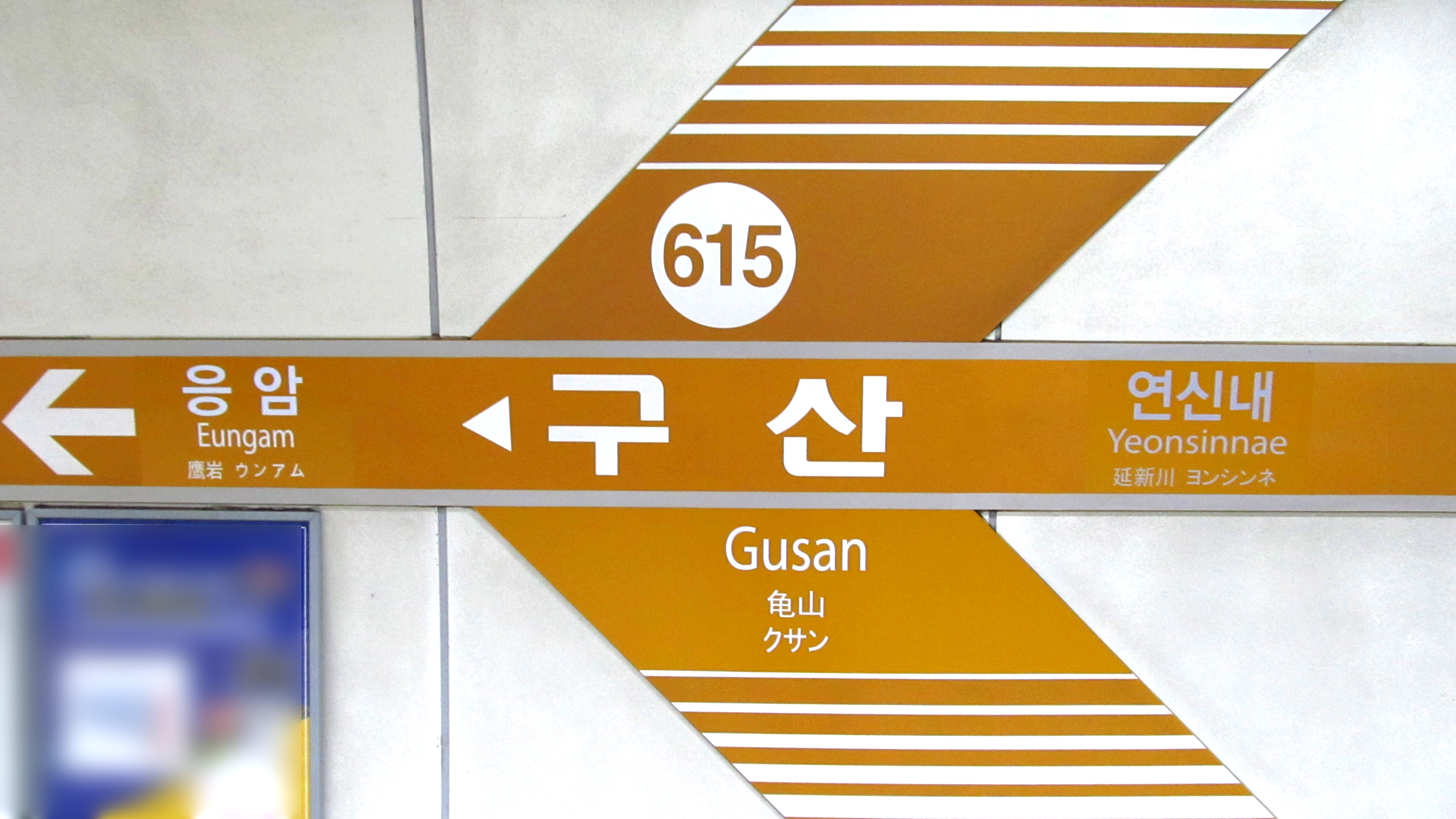

Korean name
- Hangul: 구산역
- Hanja: 龜山驛
- Revised Romanization: Gusannyeok
- McCune–Reischauer: Kusannyŏk

General information
- Location: 1-21 Gusan-dong, 137-1 Yeonseoro Jiha, Eunpyeong-gu, Seoul
- Coordinates: 37°36′41″N 126°55′02″E
- Operator: Seoul Metro
- Line: Line 6
- Platforms: 1
- Tracks: 1

Construction
- Structure type: Underground

History
- Opened: December 15, 2000

Services
Preceding station	Seoul Metropolitan Subway	Following station
Dokbawi One-way operation	Line 6	Eungam towards Sinnae
Location

Gusan Station is a railway station on Line 6 of the Seoul Subway located at Gusan-dong, Eunpyeong District, Seoul, South Korea. This station is part of the one-way section of Line 6 known as the Eungam Loop.

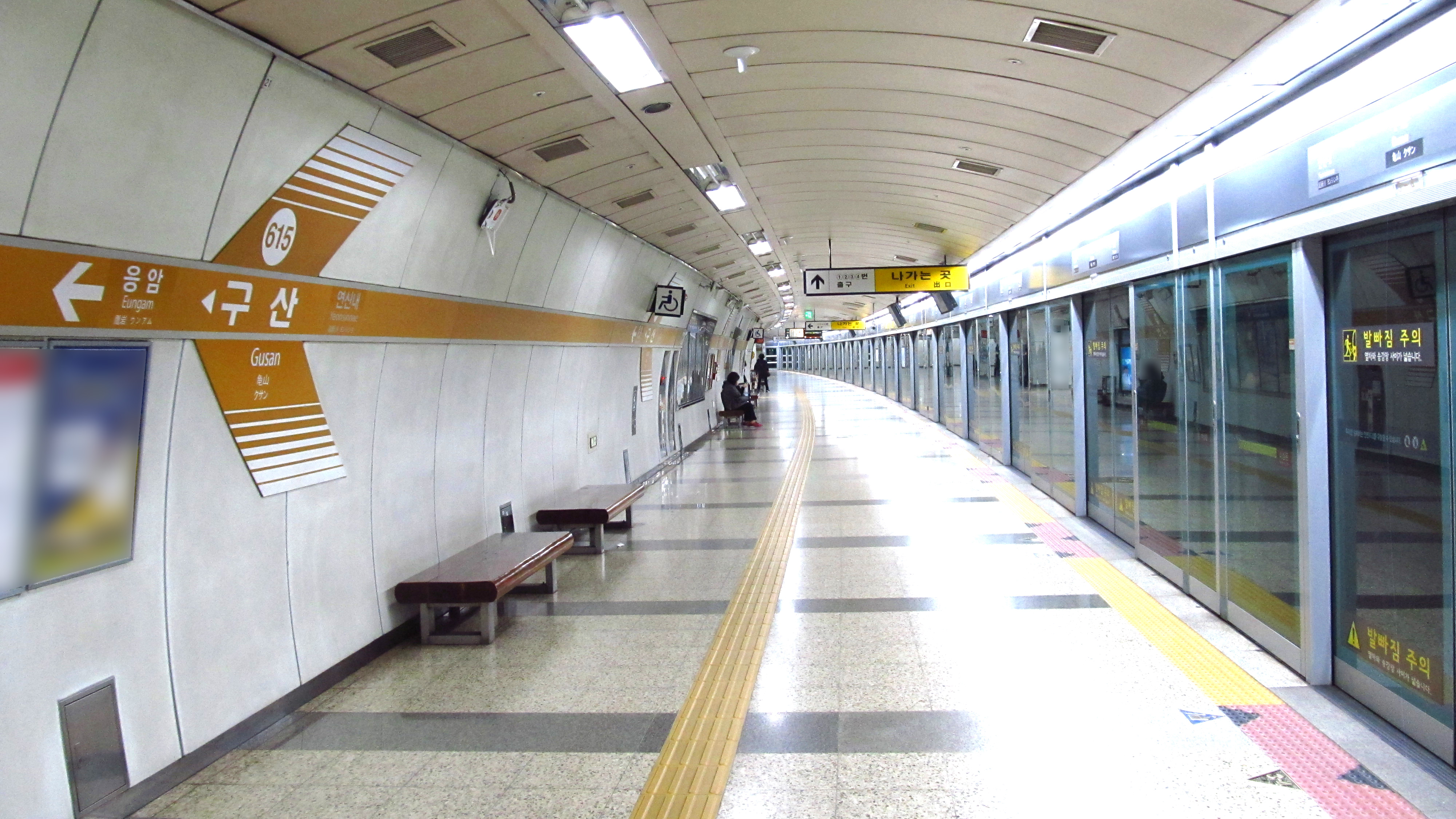
Station platform

== Station layout ==
G	Street level	Exit

L1; Concourse	Lobby	Customer Service, Shops, Vending machines, ATMs

L2; Platform level	Side platform, doors will open on the right
L2; Platform level	Single track	← Line 6 toward Sinnae via loop (Eungam) (No service: Yeonsinnae)

== Exits ==
- Exit 3 : Gusan Market
