= Eungam-dong =

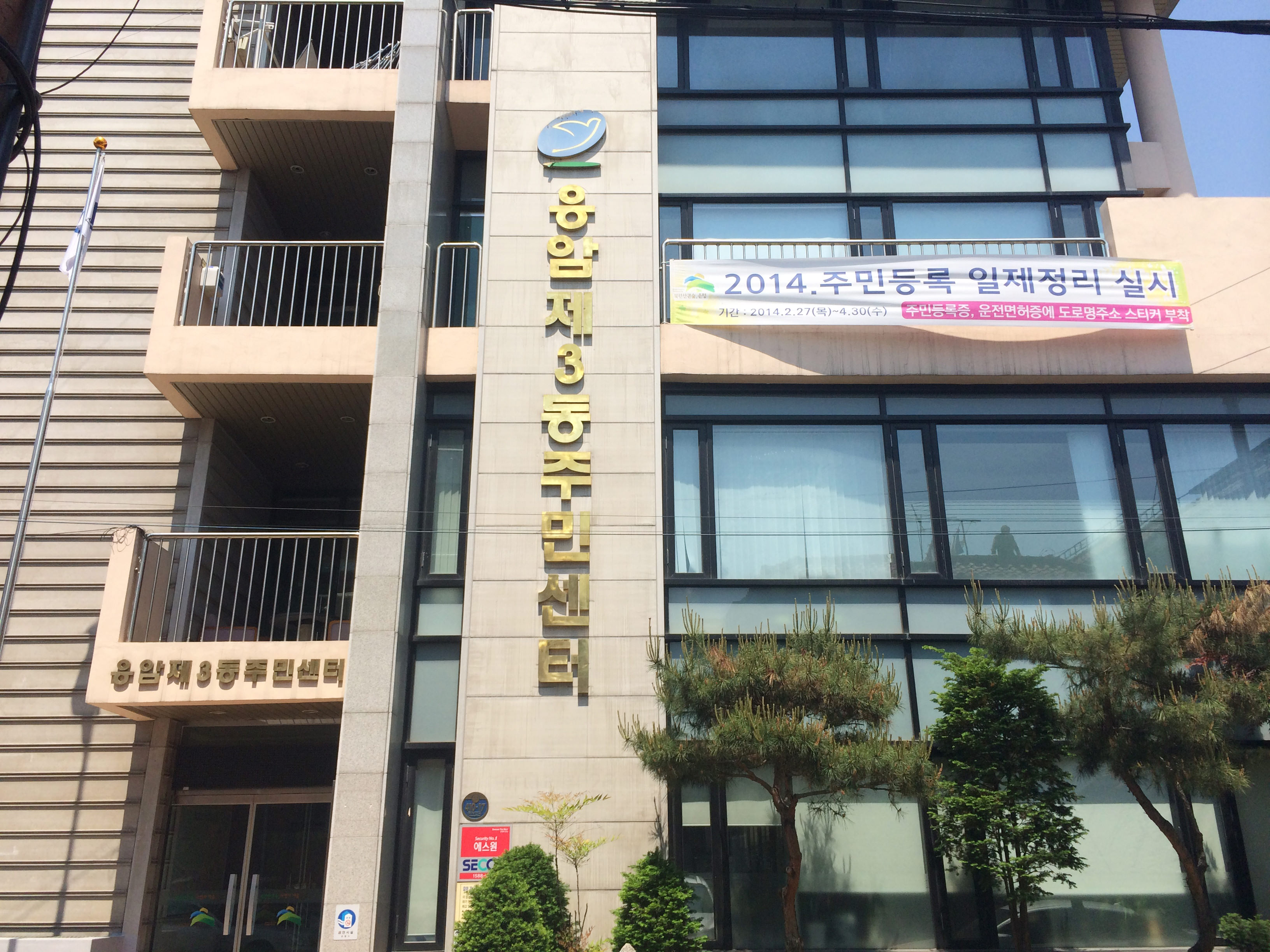
- Eungam 3-dong Community Service Center
- Country: South Korea

Area
  - Total: 2.64 km^{2} (1.02 sq mi)

Population (2001)
  - Total: 92,343
  - Density: 34,978/km^{2} (90,590/sq mi)

Korean name
- Hangul: 응암동
- Hanja: 鷹岩洞
- RR: Eungam-dong
- MR: Ŭngam-dong

Eungam-dong (Korean: 응암동) is a dong (neighborhood) of Eunpyeong District, Seoul, South Korea.

== See also ==
- Administrative divisions of South Korea
