= Jeungsan-dong =

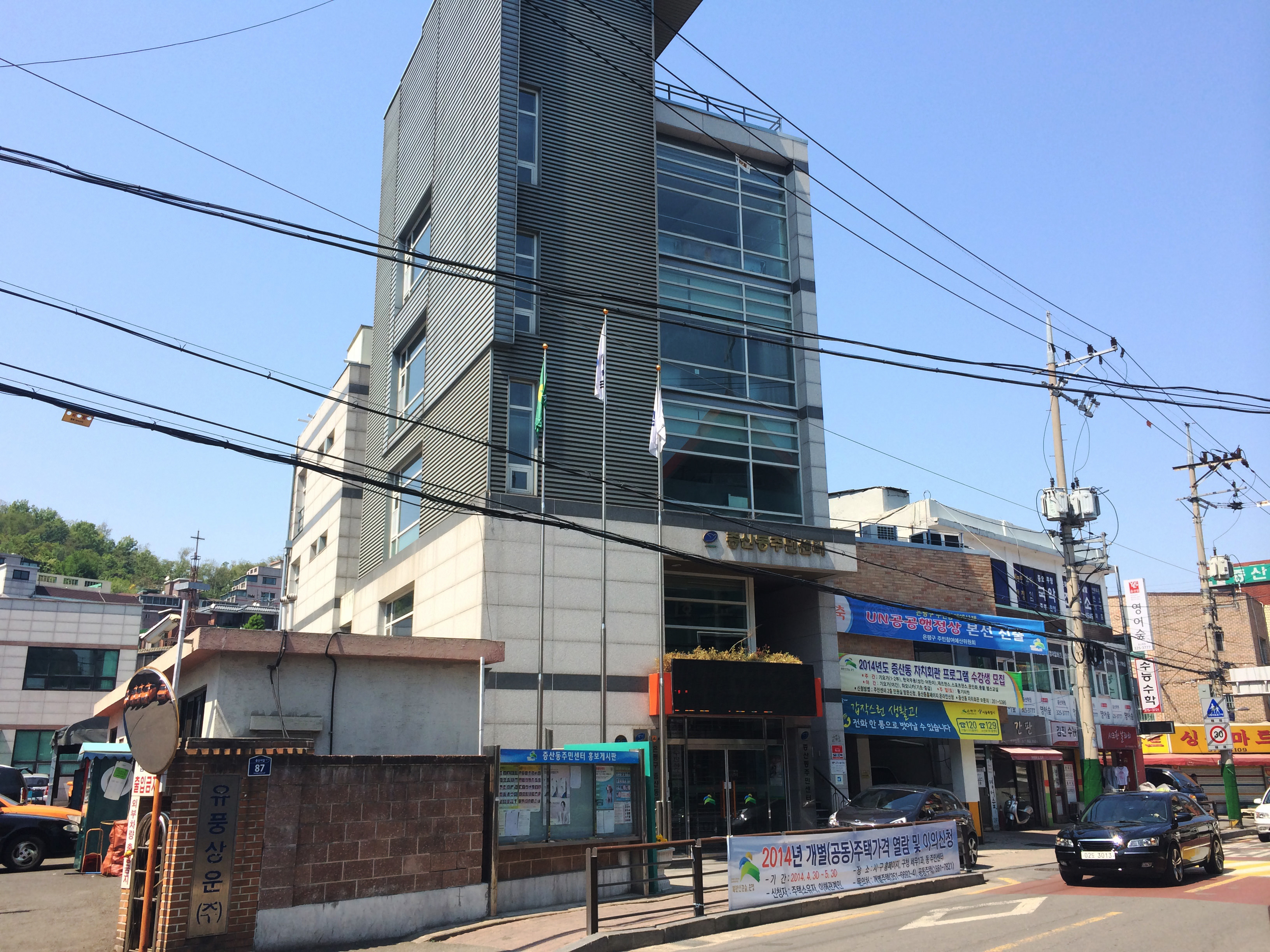
- Jeungsan-dong Community Service Center
- Interactive map of Jeungsan-dong
- Country: South Korea

Area
  - Total: 0.81 km^{2} (0.31 sq mi)

Population (2001)
  - Total: 21,036
  - Density: 25,970/km^{2} (67,300/sq mi)

Korean name
- Hangul: 증산동
- Hanja: 繒山洞
- RR: Jeungsan-dong
- MR: Chŭngsan-dong

Jeungsan-dong (Korean: 증산동) is a dong (neighbourhood) of Eunpyeong District, Seoul, South Korea.

== Etymology ==
The name Jeungsan-dong is derived from an older name, "Sirumoe". It was named after the mountain behind the village (Banhongsan) which has a distinct overturned-like shape.

== See also ==
- Administrative divisions of South Korea
