= Eunpyeong District =

District of Seoul, South Korea

Eunpyeong
- Autonomous District
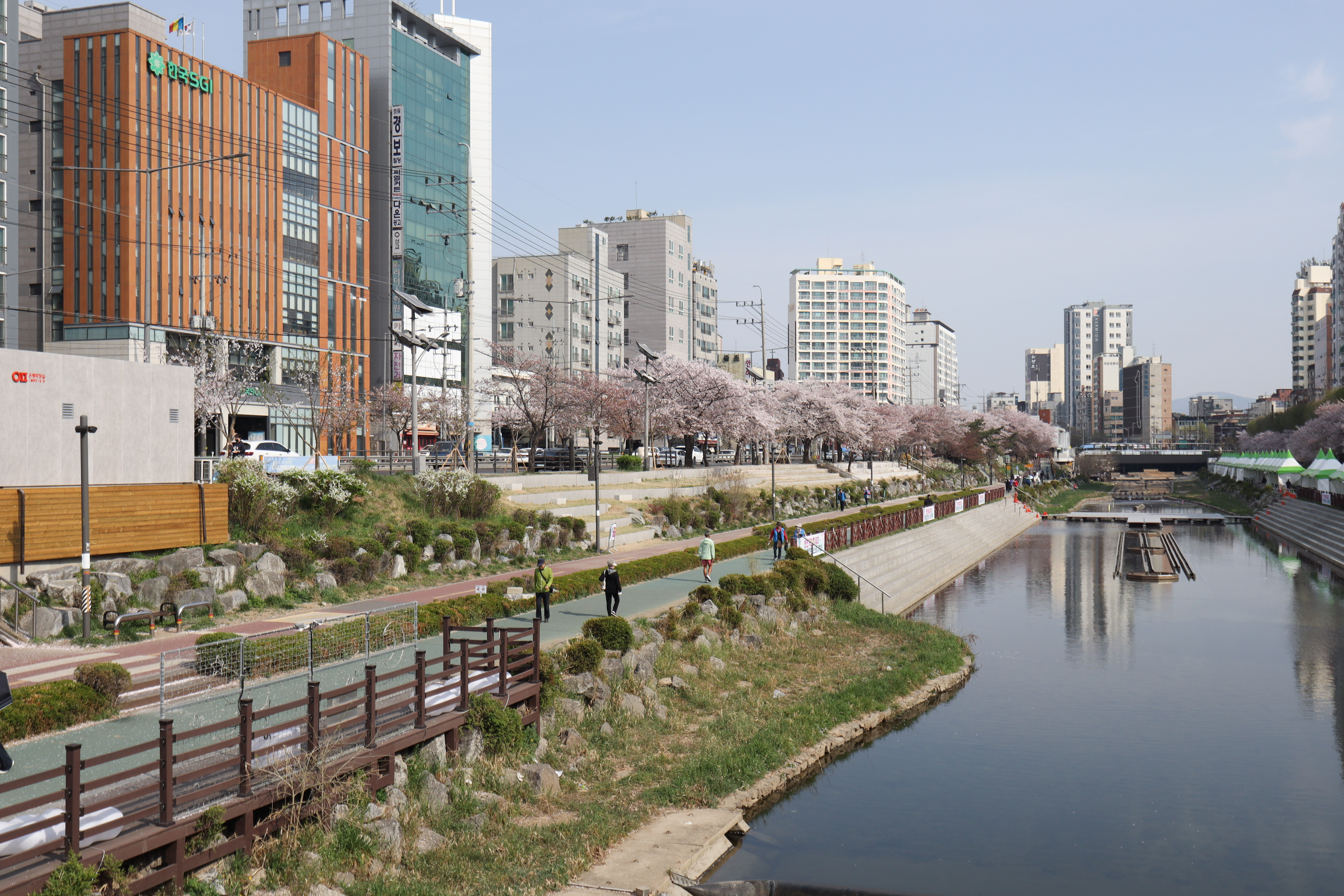
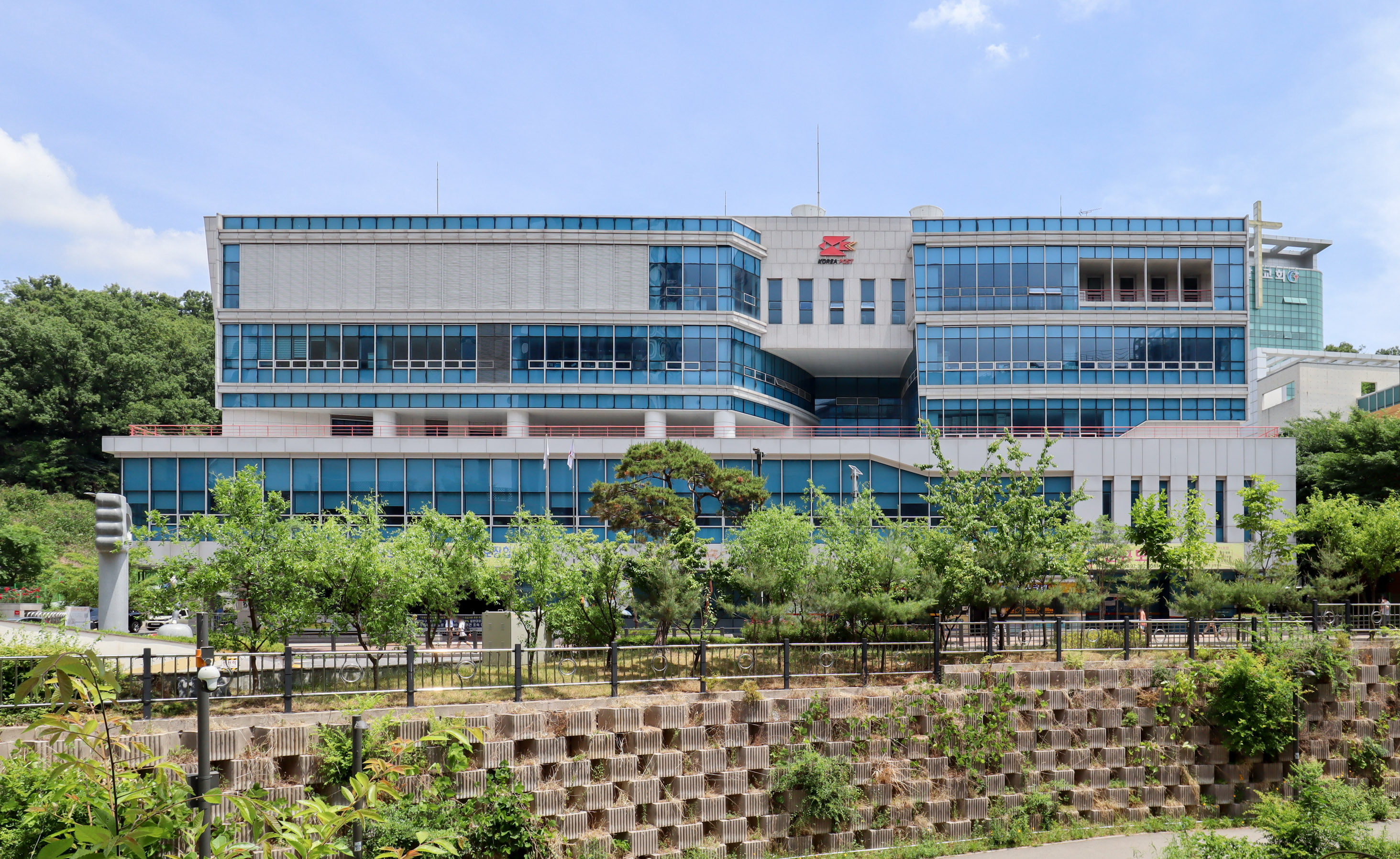
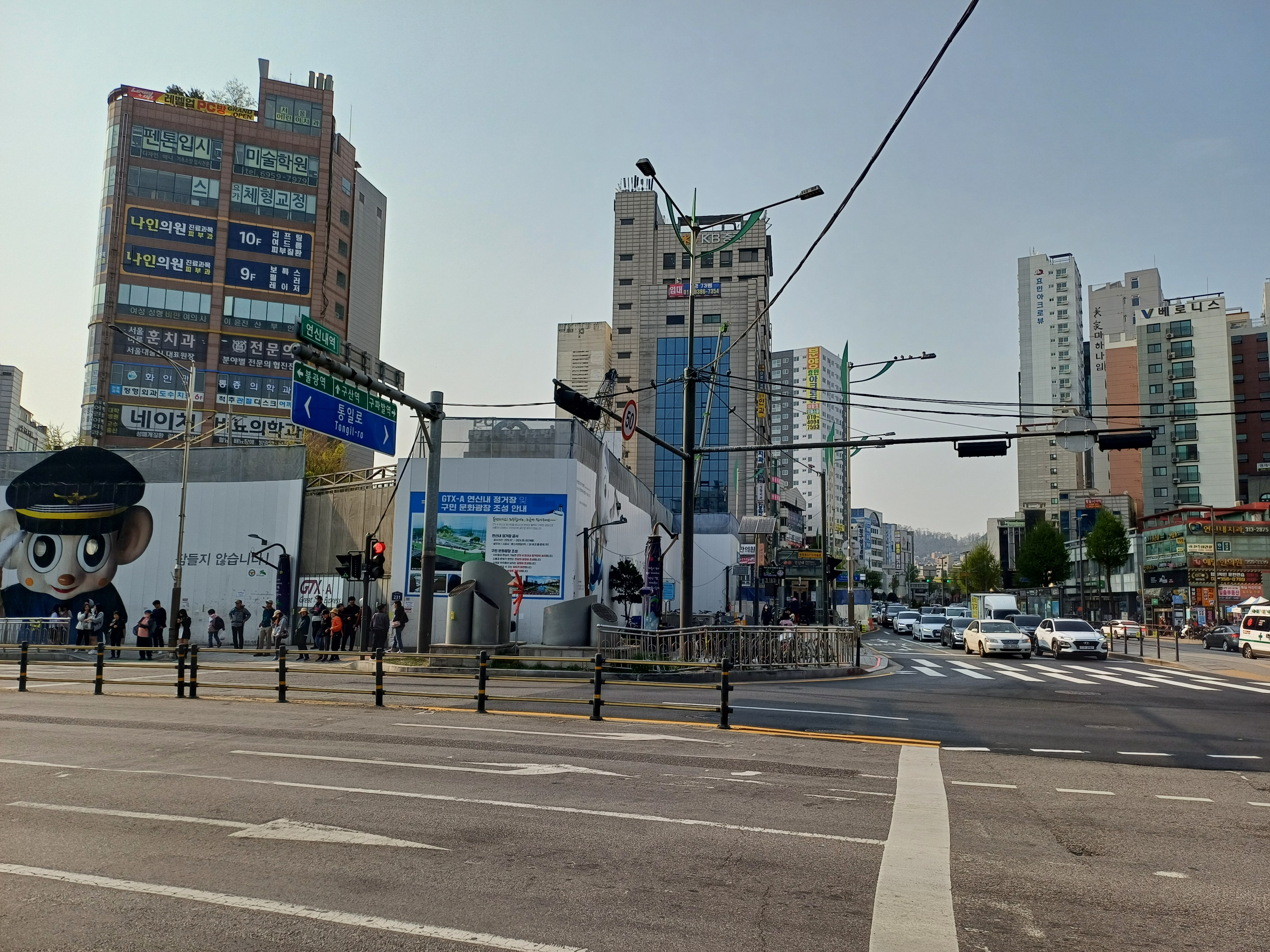
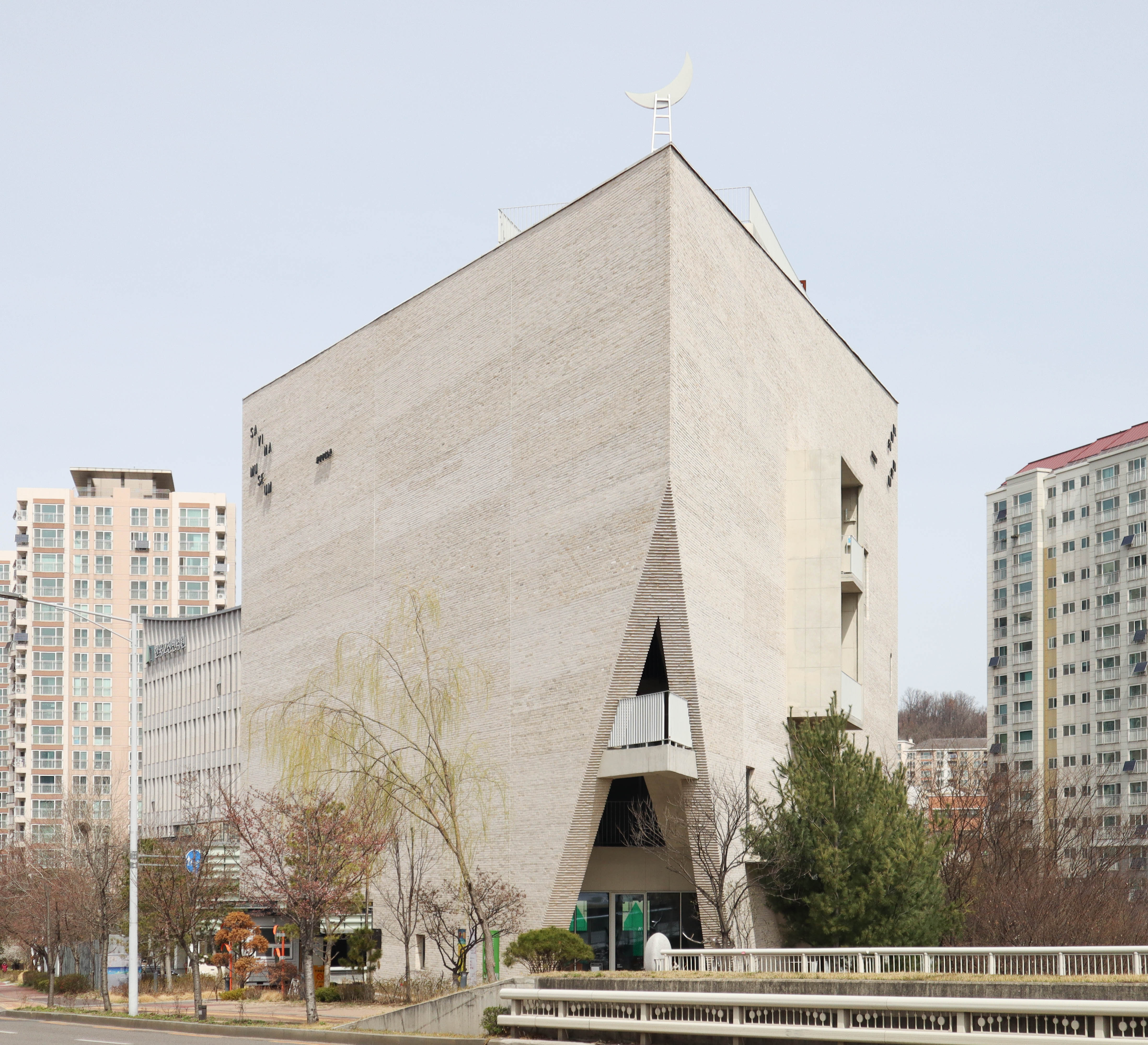
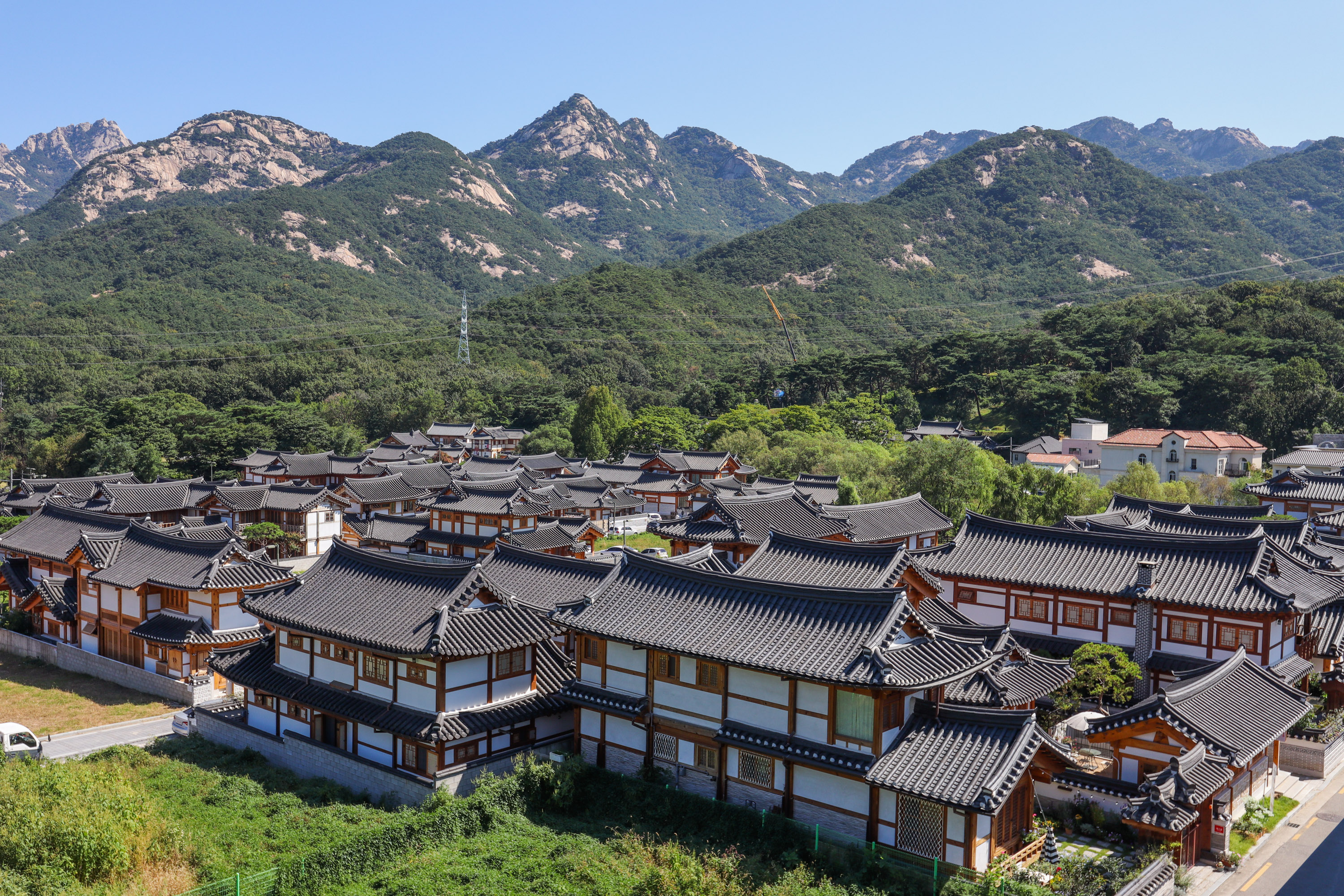
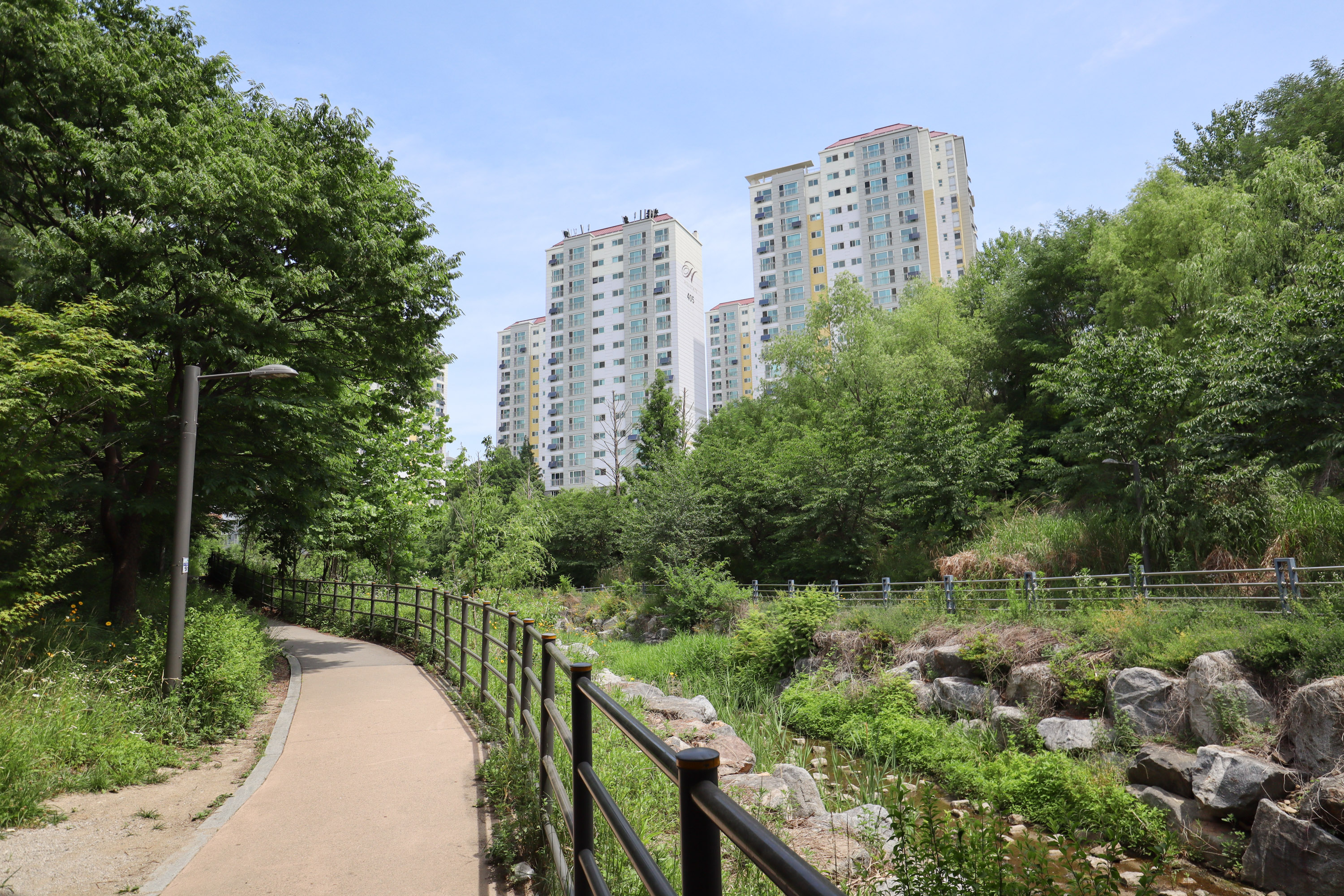
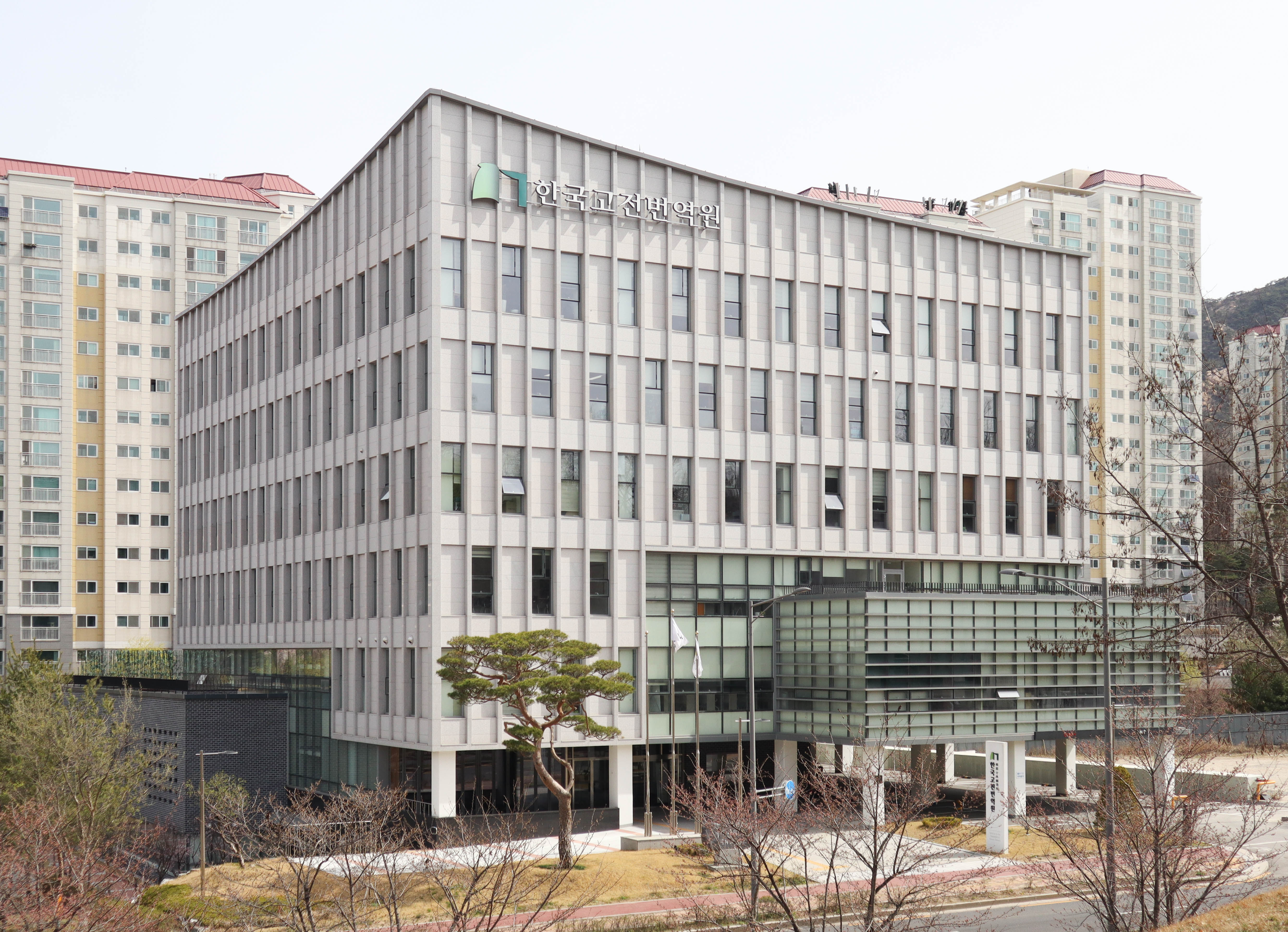
- Bulgwangcheon Eunpyeong Post Office Yeonsinnae Station Savina Museum Eunpyeong Hanok Village in Jingwan-dong Gupabalcheon Stream Institute for the Translation of Korean Classics

- Flag

- Location of Eunpyeong District in Seoul
- Interactive map of Eunpyeong
- Coordinates: 37°36′9.71″N 126°55′44.80″E
- Country: South Korea
- Region: Sudogwon
- Special City: Seoul
- Administrative dong: 16

Government
  - Body: Eunpyeong-gu Council
  - Mayor: Kim Mi-kyung (Democratic)
  - MNAs: List of MNAs: Park Joo-min (Democratic); Kang Byung-won (Democratic)

Area
  - Total: 29.7 km^{2} (11.5 sq mi)

Population (2010)
  - Total: 450,583
  - Density: 15,200/km^{2} (39,300/sq mi)
- Time zone: UTC+9 (Korea Standard Time)
- Postal code: 03300 – 03599
- Area code: +82-2-300~
- Website: Eunpyeong District official website

Korean name
- Hangul: 은평구
- Hanja: 恩平區
- RR: Eunpyeong-gu
- MR: Ŭnp'yŏng-gu

Eunpyeong District (Korean: 은평구) is one of the 25 districts of Seoul, South Korea. Eunpyeong is divided into 16 dong (administrative neighborhoods). Eunpyeong is located in northwestern Seoul, bordering Gyeonggi Province city of Goyang to the west, and the Seoul districts of Mapo to the southwest, Seodaemun District to the south, and Jongno District to the east.

Kim Mi-kyung of the Democratic Party was elected mayor in July 2018.

== Administrative divisions ==
Administrative divisions

- Bulgwang-dong (불광동; 佛光洞)
- Daejo-dong (대조동; 大棗洞)
- Eungam-dong (응암동; 鷹岩洞)
- Galhyeon-dong (갈현동; 葛峴洞)
- Gusan-dong (구산동; 龜山洞)
- Jeungsan-dong (증산동; 繒山洞)
- Jingwan-dong (진관동; 津寬洞)
- Nokbeon-dong (녹번동; 碌磻洞)
- Sinsa-dong (신사동; 新寺洞)
- Susaek-dong (수색동; 水色洞)
- Yeokchon-dong (역촌동; 驛村洞)

== Transport ==
=== Railways ===
- Seoul Metro

- ■ Seoul Underground Line 3

- (Deogyang-gu, City of Goyang) ← Gupabal ─ Yeonsinnae ─ Bulgwang ─ Nokbeon → (Seodaemun-gu)

- Seoul Metropolitan Rapid Transit Corporation

- ■ Seoul Underground Line 6

- (Mapo-gu) → Susaek → Jeungsan → Saejeol → Eungam → Yeokchon → Bulgwang → Dokbawi → Yeonsinnae → Gusan → Eungam → Saejeol → Jeungsan → Susaek → (Mapo-gu)

(From Eungam to Eungam via Bulgwang and Yeonsinnae is the single direction zone.)

== Sister cities ==
- Canterbury-Bankstown, New South Wales, Australia
- Dadong, China
- Yuhong, China
