= Dokbawi station =

Train station in South Korea

독바위; Dokbawi
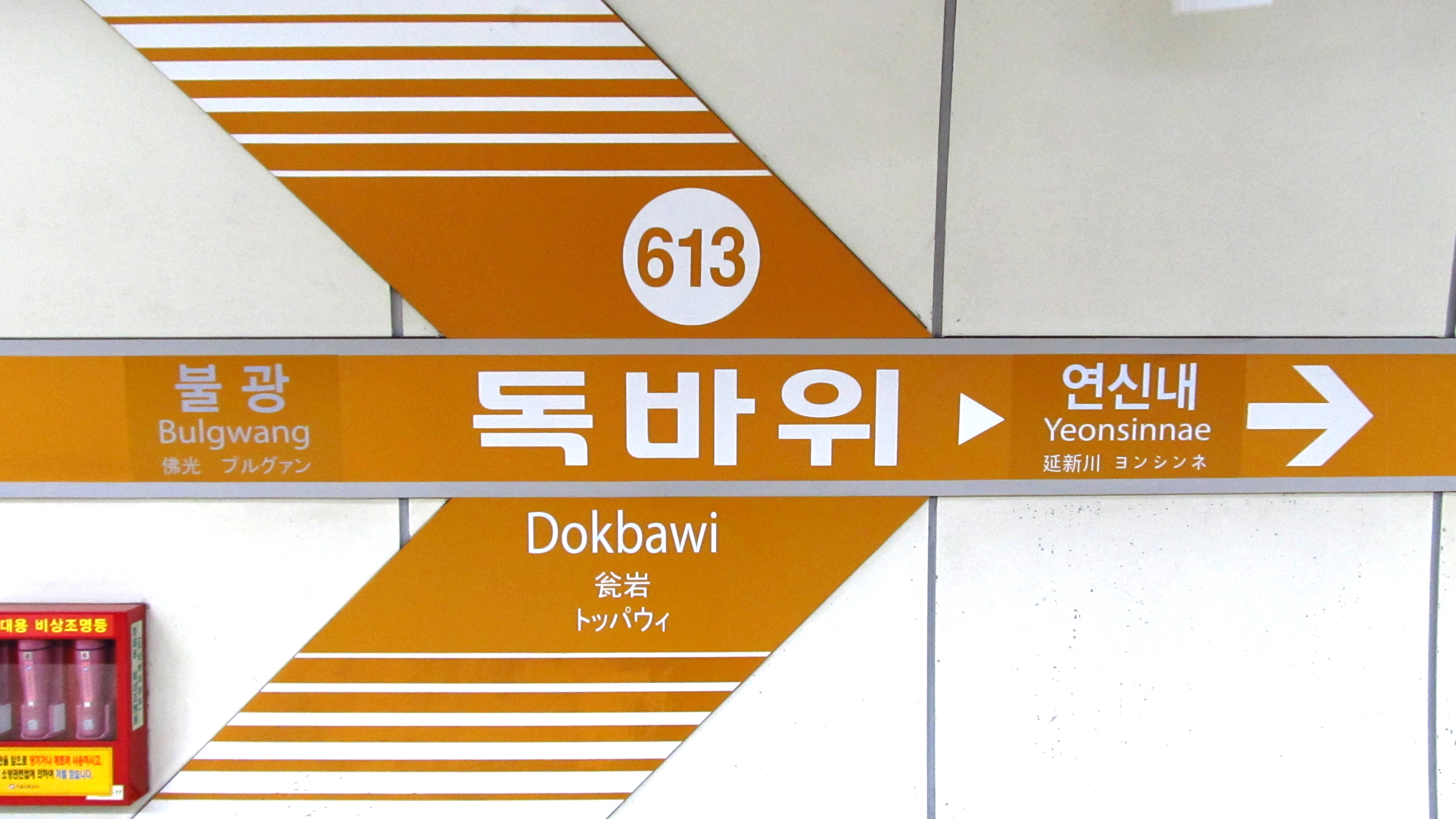

Korean name
- Hangul: 독바위역
- Hanja: 독바위驛
- Revised Romanization: Dokbawi-yeok
- McCune–Reischauer: Tokpawi-yŏk

General information
- Location: 129-1 Bulgwang-ro Jiha, 13-33 Bulgwang-dong, Eunpyeong-gu, Seoul
- Coordinates: 37°37′07″N 126°55′58″E
- Operated by: Seoul Metro
- Line(s): Line 6
- Platforms: 1
- Tracks: 1

Construction
- Structure type: Underground

History
- Opened: December 15, 2000

Services
Preceding station	Seoul Metropolitan Subway	Following station
Yeonsinnae towards Sinnae via Gusan	Line 6	Bulgwang One-way operation
Location

Dokbawi Station is a railway station on Line 6 of the Seoul Metropolitan Subway in Eunpyeong District, Seoul, South Korea. This station is part of a one-way section of Line 6 known as the Eungam Loop. It is located in a relatively low-density area, and only has one exit.

== Station layout ==
G	Street level	Exit

L1; Concourse	Lobby	Customer Service, Shops, Vending machines, ATMs

L2; Platform level	Side platform, doors will open on the left
L2; Platform level	Single track	Line 6 toward Sinnae via loop → (Yeonsinnae) (No service: Bulgwang)

== Exits ==
- Exit 1: Yeoncheon Elementary School

== Gallery ==
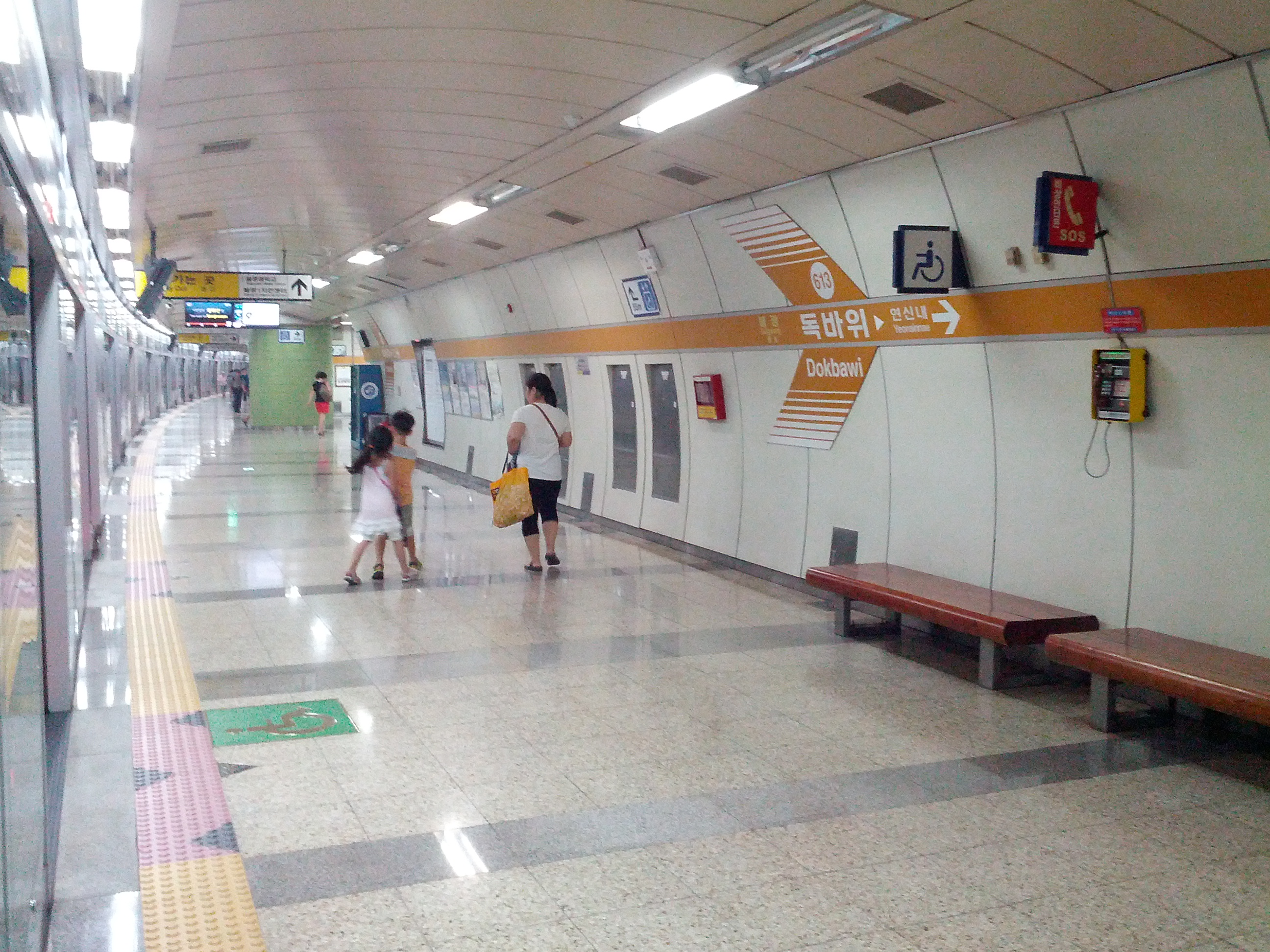

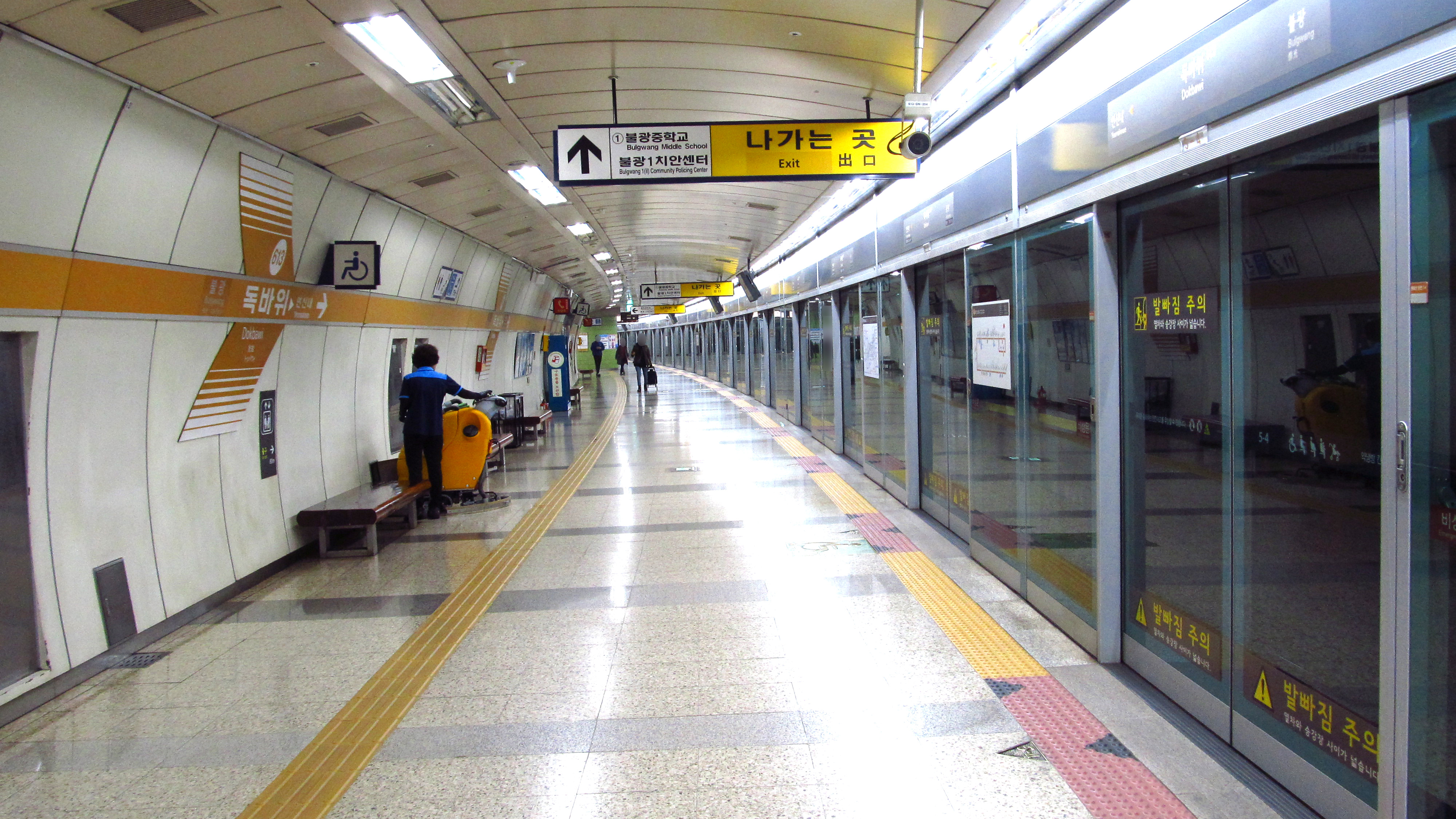
