= Daejo-dong =

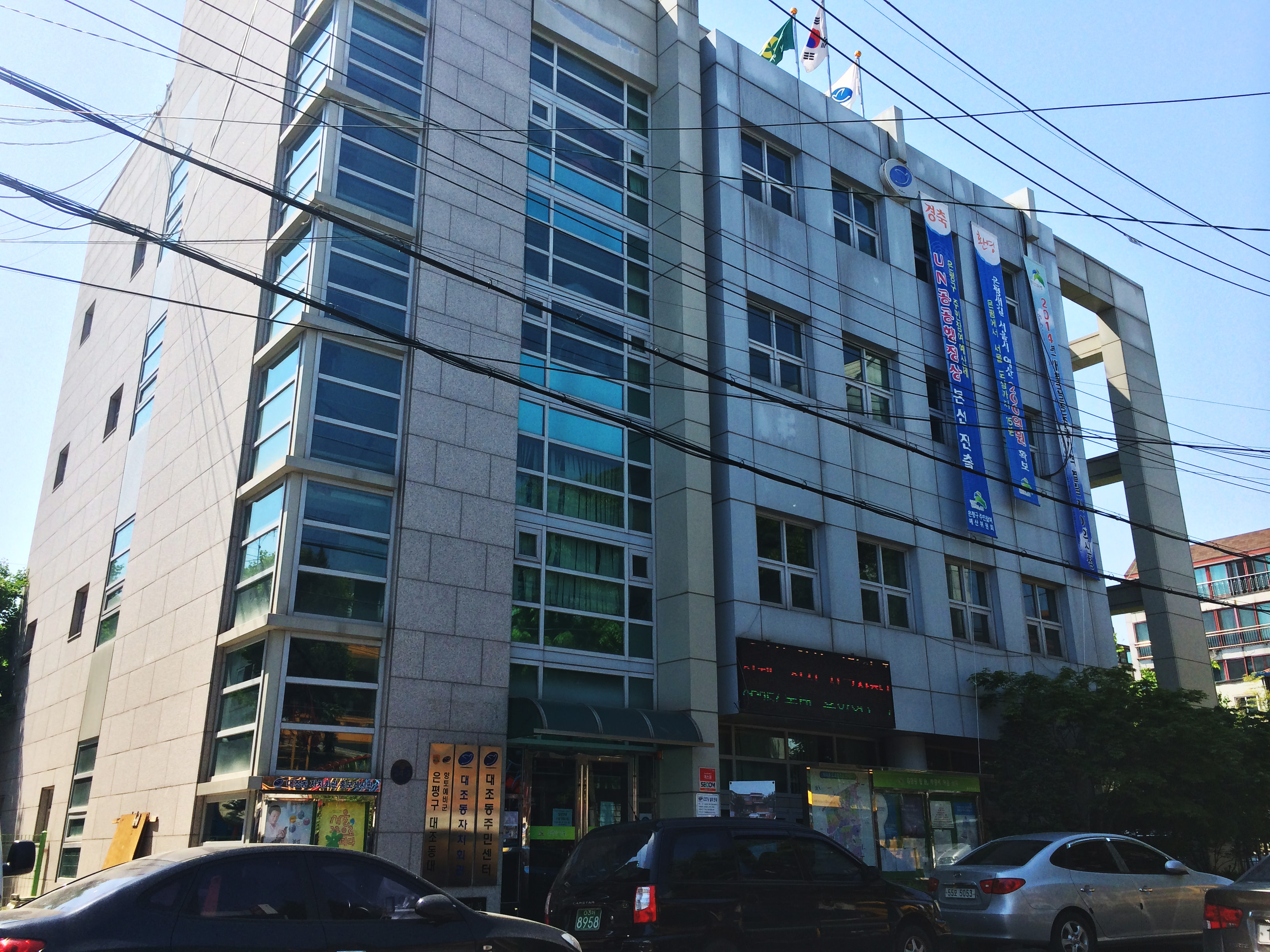
- Daejo-dong Community Service Center
- Interactive map of Daejo-dong
- Country: South Korea

Area
  - Total: 0.85 km^{2} (0.33 sq mi)

Population (2001)
  - Total: 31,477
  - Density: 37,032/km^{2} (95,910/sq mi)

Korean name
- Hangul: 대조동
- Hanja: 大棗洞
- RR: Daejo-dong
- MR: Taejo-dong

Daejo-dong (Korean: 대조동) is a dong (neighborhood) of Eunpyeong District, Seoul, South Korea.

== See also ==
- Administrative divisions of South Korea
