= Gusan-dong =

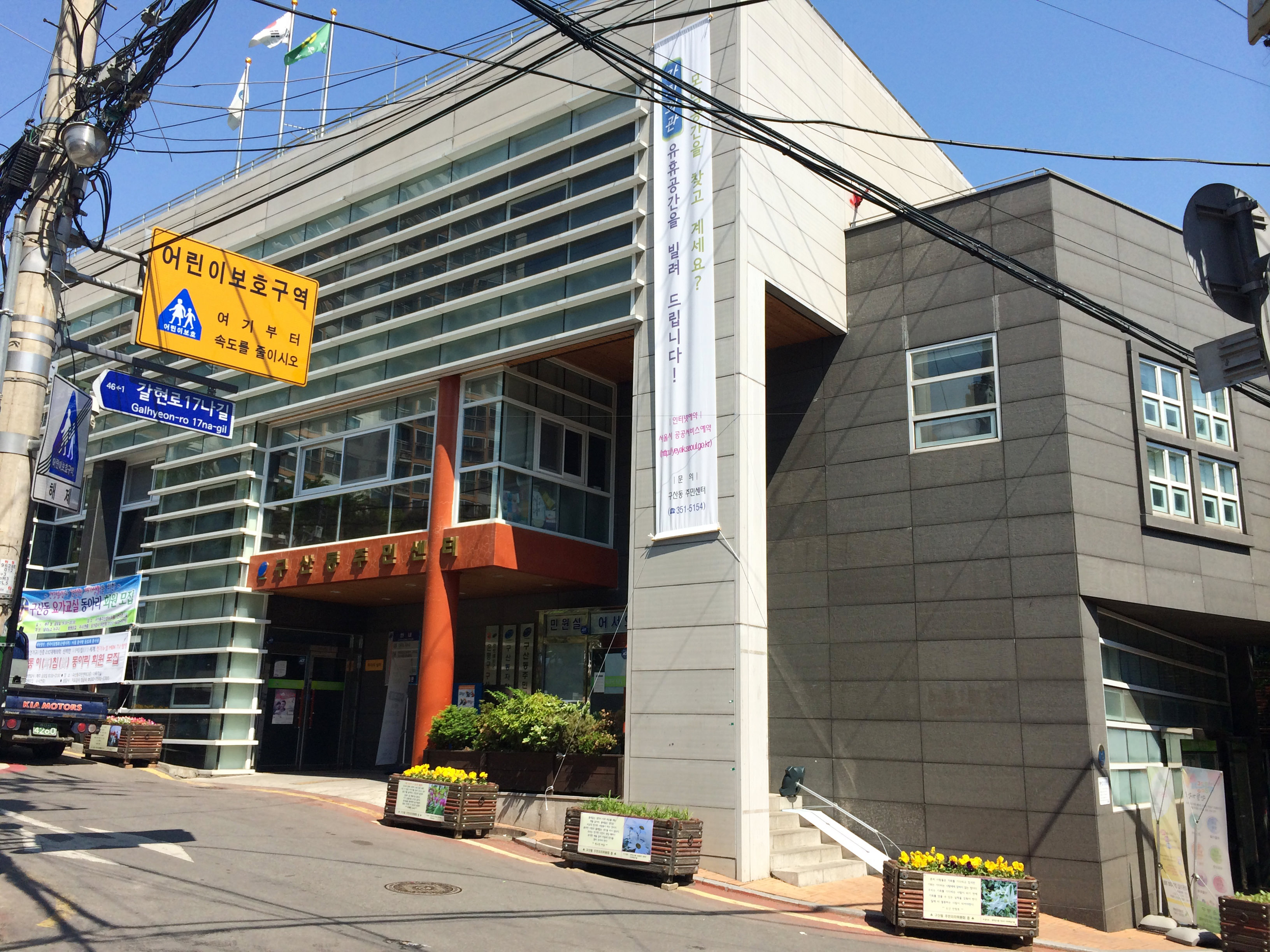
- Gusan-dong Community Service Center
- Interactive map of Gusan-dong
- Coordinates: 37°36′43″N 126°54′27″E
- Country: South Korea

Area
  - Total: 1.39 km^{2} (0.54 sq mi)

Population (2001)
  - Total: 27,546
  - Density: 19,817/km^{2} (51,330/sq mi)

Korean name
- Hangul: 구산동
- Hanja: 龜山洞
- RR: Gusan-dong
- MR: Kusan-dong

Gusan-dong (Korean: 구산동) is a dong (neighborhood) of Eunpyeong District, Seoul, South Korea.

== Heritage ==
Gusan-dong is home to Suguksa Temple, an ancient temple that was established in the year 1459 during the reign of King Sejo in the Joseon period.

== See also ==
- Administrative divisions of South Korea
