= Sinsa-dong, Eunpyeong =

Sinsa-dong
- Country: South Korea

Korean name
- Hangul: 신사동
- Hanja: 新寺洞
- RR: Sinsa-dong
- MR: Sinsa-dong

Sinsa-dong (Korean: 신사동) is a dong (neighbourhood) of Eunpyeong District, Seoul, South Korea.

== Etymology ==
The name of Sinsa-dong (新寺洞) is said to have originated from a new temple, located near Sinsa-dong.

== See also ==
- Administrative divisions of South Korea
