= Yeokchon-dong =

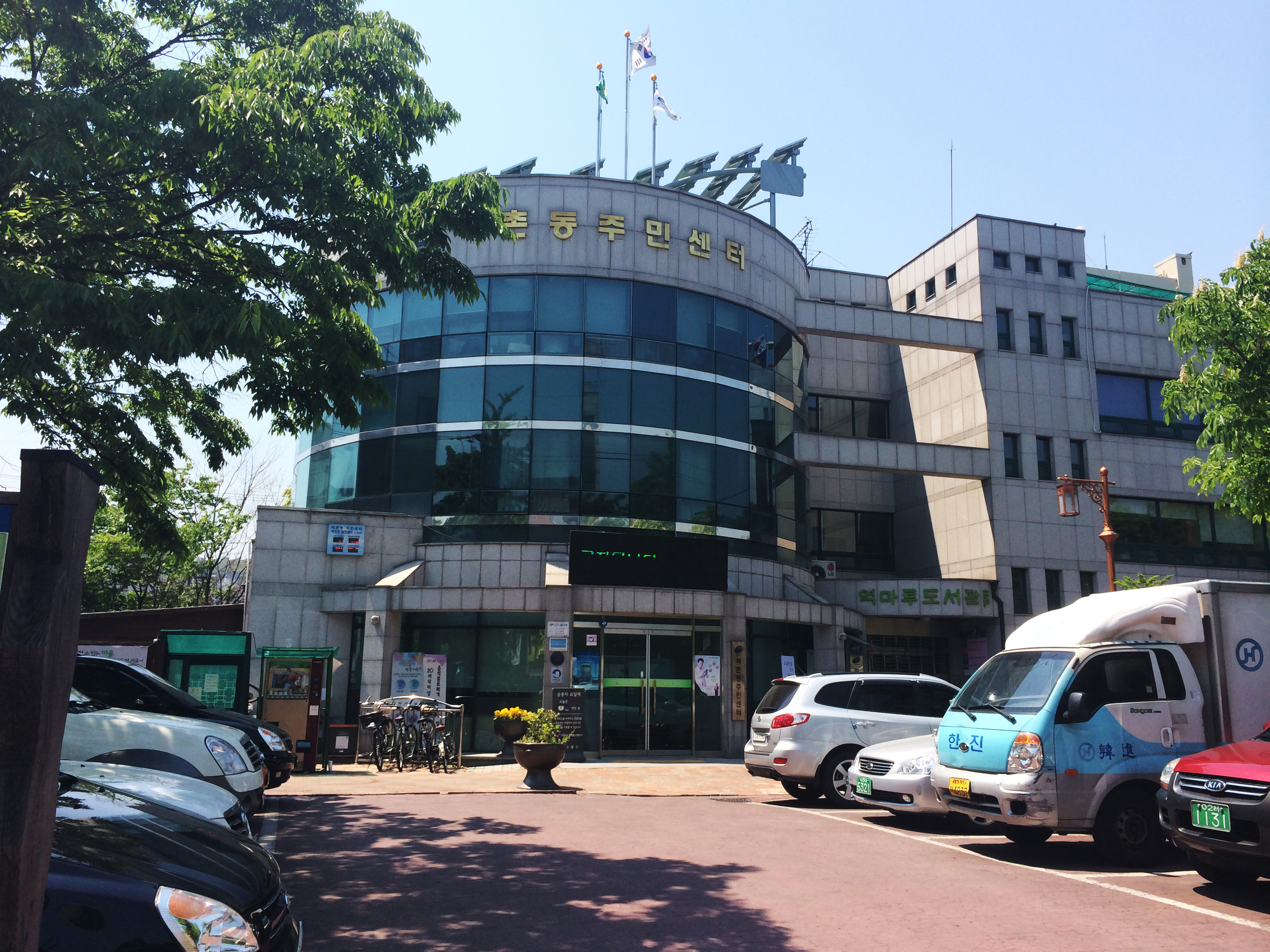
- Yeokchon-dong Community Service Center
- Interactive map of Yeokchon-dong
- Country: South Korea

Area
  - Total: 1.16 km^{2} (0.45 sq mi)

Population (2001)
  - Total: 41,294
  - Density: 35,598/km^{2} (92,200/sq mi)

Korean name
- Hangul: 역촌동
- Hanja: 驛村洞
- RR: Yeokchon-dong
- MR: Yŏkch'on-dong

Yeokchon-dong (Korean: 역촌동) is a dong (neighbourhood) of Eunpyeong District, Seoul, South Korea.

== History ==
In the 1970s, as a result of urban planning initiatives, Yeokchon-dong was developed into a residential area. On 1 September 1985, it was divided into two sub-districts, namely Yeokchon 1-dong and Yeokchon 2-dong. However, on 2 June 2008, these sub-districts were merged and unified under the name Yeokchon-dong.

== See also ==
- Administrative divisions of South Korea
