= Kim Mi-kyung (politician) =

South Korean politician

- 김미경

Mayor of Eunpyeong District
- Incumbent
- Assumed office 1 July 2018
- Preceded by: Kim Woo-young

Member of Seoul Metropolitan Council
- In office 1 July 2010 – 30 June 2018
- Constituency: 2nd district of Eunpyeong District

Member of Eunpyeong District Council
- In office 25 April 2003 – 30 June 2007
- In office 20 December 2007 – 30 June 2010

Personal details
- Born: 5 July 1965 (age 61) Yeongam County, South Jeolla Province, South Korea
- Party: Democratic
- Education: Korea National Open University; Korea University; Chugye University for the Arts

Kim Mi-kyung (Korean: 김미경; Hanja: 金美京; born 5 July 1965) is a South Korean politician serving as mayor of Eunpyeong District of Seoul from 2018 and its first woman mayor.

Kim's father unsuccessfully ran for Eunpyeong District Council member in 1998. Kim's family supported her campaign in 2003 bi-election for the same post.

In the 2007 bi-election which happened on the same day as 2007 South Korean presidential election, Kim was the only democratic local council member to be elected outside of liberal stronghold Honam region with others being members of Hannara Party, the party of president-elect Lee Myung-bak.

From 2010 to 2014 Kim worked as the spokesperson of her party in Seoul Metropolitan Council. Also, she took several roles in her party such as deputy spokesperson of her party, vice chair of its Women's Committee and vice chair of Policy Planning Committee.

In 2014 Kim was elected as the first woman to chair the City Planning Management Committee of Seoul Metropolitan Council.

Kim joined both of Moon Jae-in's presidential campaigns - chair of Seoul branch of the committee composed of members from civil societies in 2012 and chair of special committee on veterans affairs in 2017.

In the 2020 election, Kim could not even stand for the first round of primary to secure her party's nomination for Eunpyeong Mayor. However, with the petition of 8000 people signed in two days, she requested retrial to her party's election commission and eventually topped two rounds of primary elections defeating 8 potential candidates and securing the nomination.

Kim holds two degrees - a bachelor from Korea National Open University and a master's from Korea University. She also completed a doctoral programme in cultural arts studies at Chugye University for the Arts.

== Electoral history ==
Election	Year	Post	Party affiliation	Votes	Percentage of votes	Results
Bi-election	2003	Member of Eunpyeong District	Independent	1,506	45.3%	Won
4th Local Election	2006	Member of Seoul Metropolitan Council from Eunpyeong District	Uri Party	14,746	35.62%	Lost
Bi-election	2007	Member of Eunpyeong District	United New Democratic Party	15,946	55.2%	Won
5th Local Election	2010	Member of Seoul Metropolitan Council from Eunpyeong District	Democratic Party (2008)	22,723	57.58%	Won
6th Local Election	2014	Member of Seoul Metropolitan Council from Eunpyeong District	New Politics Alliance for Democracy (NPAD)	24,429	57.48%	Won
7th Local Election	2018	Mayor of Eunpyeong District	Democratic Party	155,818	66.5%	Won
