= Bulgwang-dong =

Coordinates: 37.619°N 126.930°E

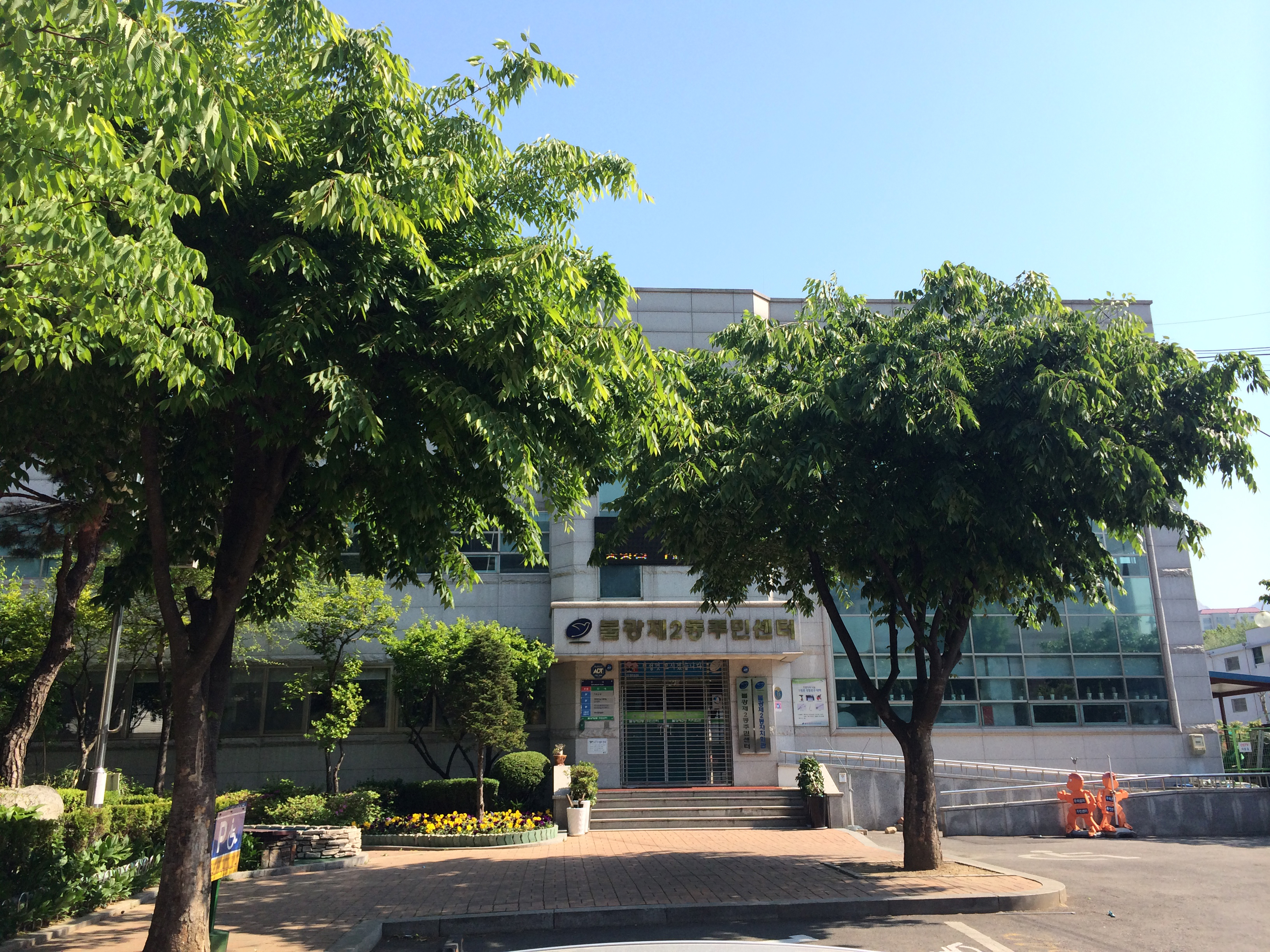
- Bulgwang 2-dong Community Service Center
- Interactive map of Bulgwang-dong
- Country: South Korea

Area
  - Total: 4.51 km^{2} (1.74 sq mi)

Population (2023)
  - Total: 78,415
  - Density: 37,780/km^{2} (97,800/sq mi)

Korean name
- Hangul: 불광동
- Hanja: 佛光洞
- RR: Bulgwang-dong
- MR: Pulgwang-dong

Bulgwang-dong (Korean: 불광동) is a neighborhood (dong) of Eunpyeong District, Seoul, South Korea.

== Etymology ==
Bulgwang-dong is a neighborhood nestled at the foot of Bukhansan Mountain, also known as Samgaksan Mountain. This picturesque area is renowned for its collection of temples, both large and small, including Rocks Temple and Bulgwangsa Temple. The name "Bulgwang-dong" holds significance as it symbolizes the belief that the divine light of Buddha illuminates this sacred place.

== See also ==
- Administrative divisions of South Korea
