= Nokbeon-dong =

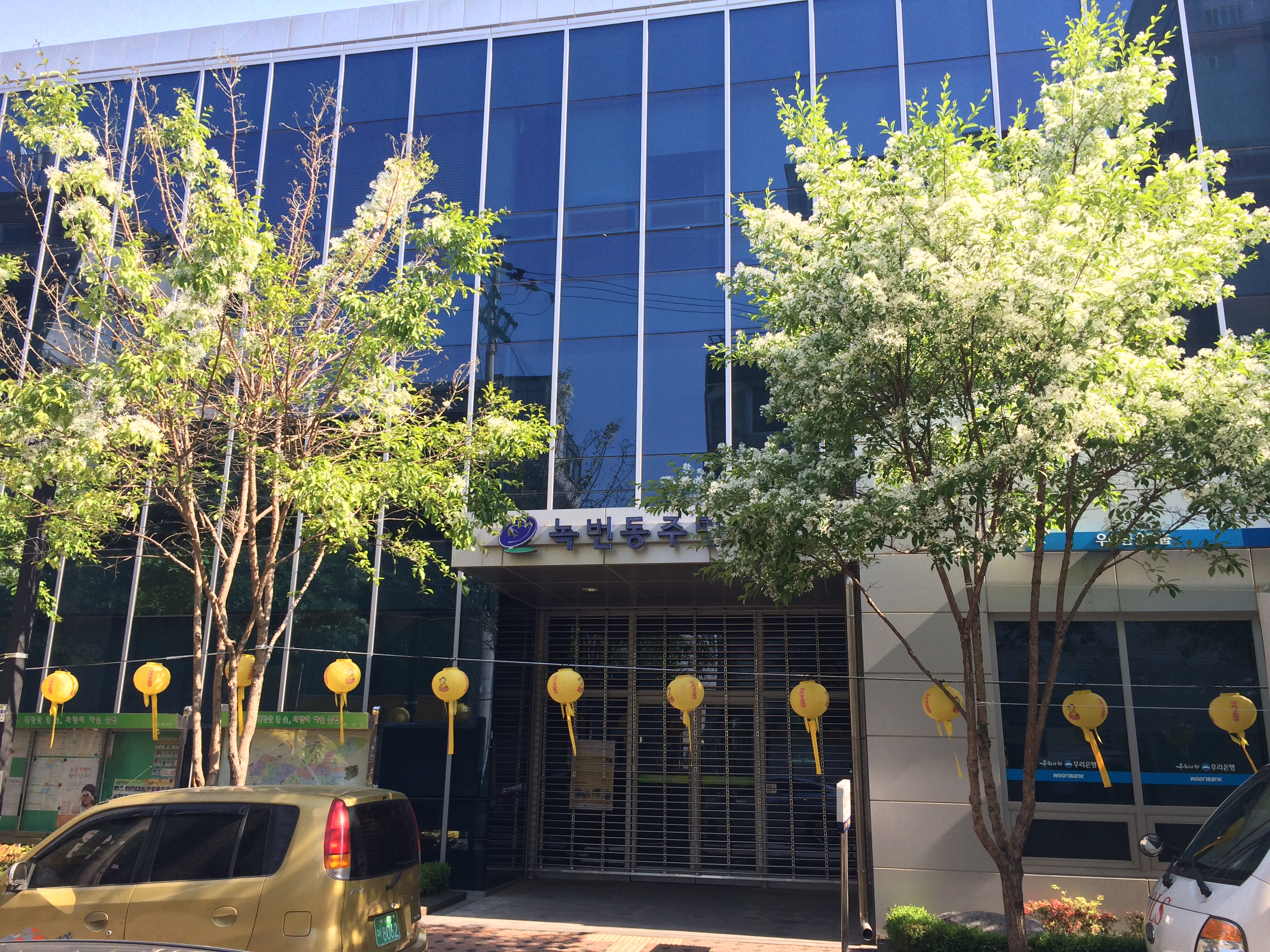
- The community service center in the neighborhood
- Interactive map of Nokbeon-dong
- Country: South Korea

Area
  - Total: 1.78 km^{2} (0.69 sq mi)

Population (2012)
  - Total: 33,447
  - Density: 18,685/km^{2} (48,390/sq mi)

Korean name
- Hangul: 녹번동
- Hanja: 碌磻洞
- RR: Nokbeon-dong
- MR: Nokpŏn-dong

Nokbeon-dong (Korean: 녹번동) is a dong, neighbourhood of Eunpyeong District, Seoul, South Korea.

== See also ==
- Administrative divisions of South Korea
