= Jongno (disambiguation) =

Jongno may refer to:

- Jongno, a street in Jongno-gu
- Jongno-gu
- Jongno (constituency)
- Jongno (film)
- Jongno 3-ga Station - A station on the Seoul metro
- Jongno 5-ga Station - A station on the Seoul metro
