= SMSC =

SMSC may refer to:

== Organizations ==
- Seoul Metropolitan Subway Corporation, now merged into Seoul Metro, South Korea
- Southwest Minnesota State College, US, now a university
- Standard Microsystems Corporation, a company acquired by Microchip Technology
- Smithsonian-Mason School of Conservation, Virginia, US, a partnership between George Mason University and the Smithsonian Institution

== Other uses ==
- Shakopee Mdewakanton Sioux Community, a tribe of Dakota people in Minnesota, US
- Short message service center, in the mobile telephone network
- Spiritual, moral, social and cultural development, provided in schools through the National Curriculum for England
