= Jeongdok Public Library =

Public library in Seoul, South Korea

Coordinates: 37°34′51.04″N 126°58′59.35″E

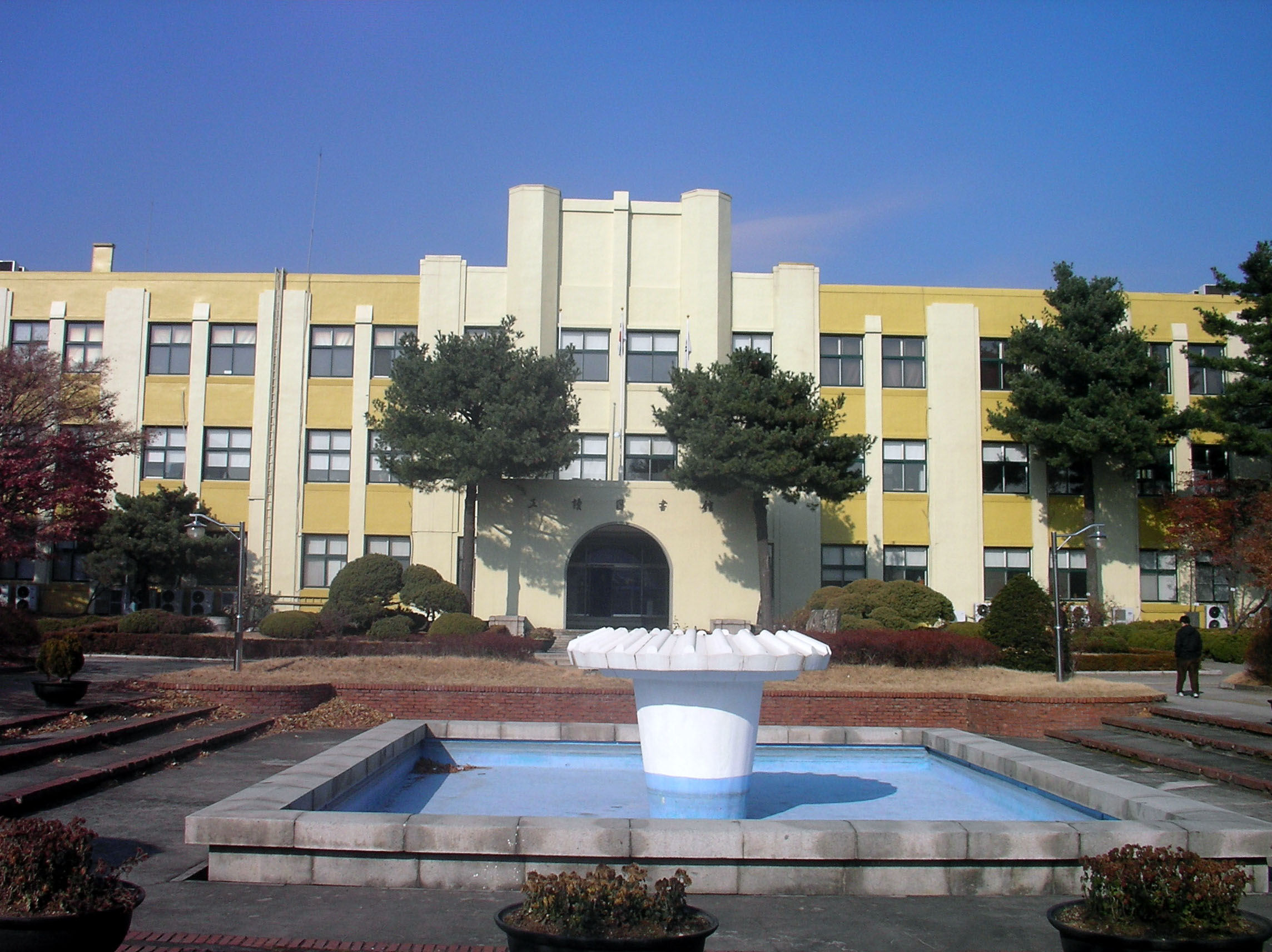
- Jeongdok Public Library in 2008

Korean name
- Hangul: 정독도서관
- Hanja: 正讀圖書館
- RR: Jeongdok doseogwan
- MR: Chŏngdok tosŏgwan

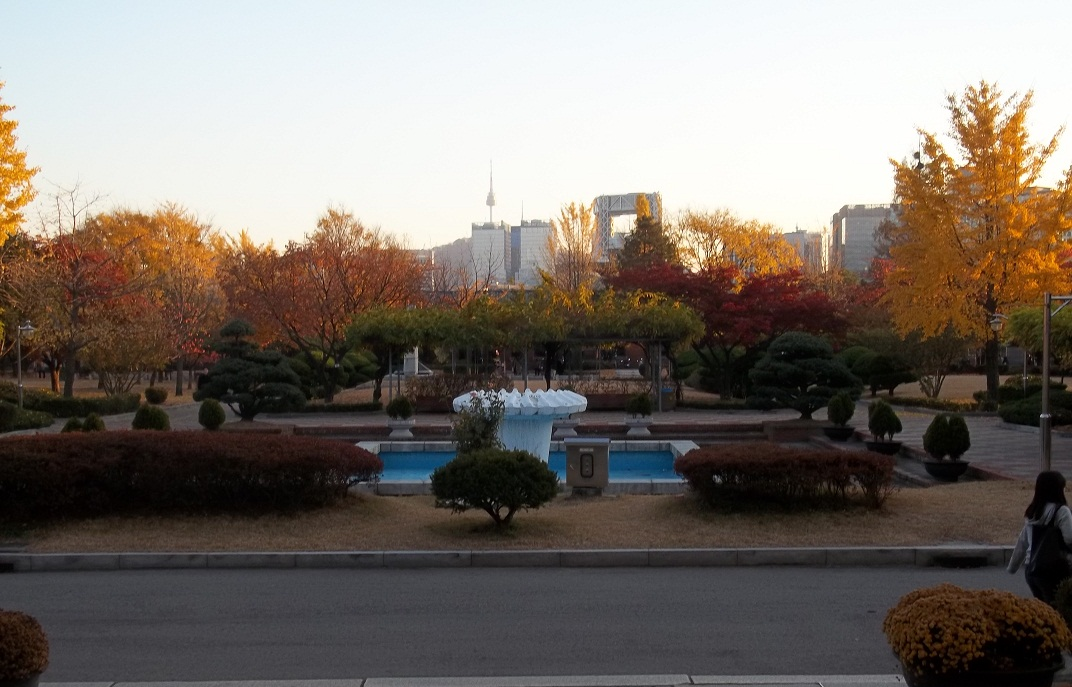
Exiting front entrance, N Seoul Tower and Jongno Tower in distance, 2014.

Jeongdok Public Library (Korean: 정독도서관) is a library in Seoul, South Korea. It is located in Hwa-dong, Jongno-gu, on Bukchon-ro.

On the campus of Jeongdok Public Library was Jongchinbu (종친부; 宗親府), Seoul Tangible Cultural Property number 9. Jongchinbu was constructed in 1433 and is one of three remaining Joseon Dynasty government buildings. The rest were destroyed in the Japanese invasions, occupation, or the Korean War.

Until February 1976, the site was occupied by the campus of Kyunggi High School. The Jeongdok Library opened in January 1977 on the former site of the school.

== Public transportation ==
The library is located within 500m from exit 1 of Line 3 Anguk Station.

== Other information ==
=== Hours of Operation ===
==== Study Rooms ====
- Weekdays: 07:00 - 22:00 (from November to February: 08:00 - 22:00)
- Weekends: 07:00 - 22:00 (from November to February: 08:00 - 22:00)
