= Changsin station =

Train station in South Korea

Coordinates: 37°34′46″N 127°00′55″E

창신; Changsin
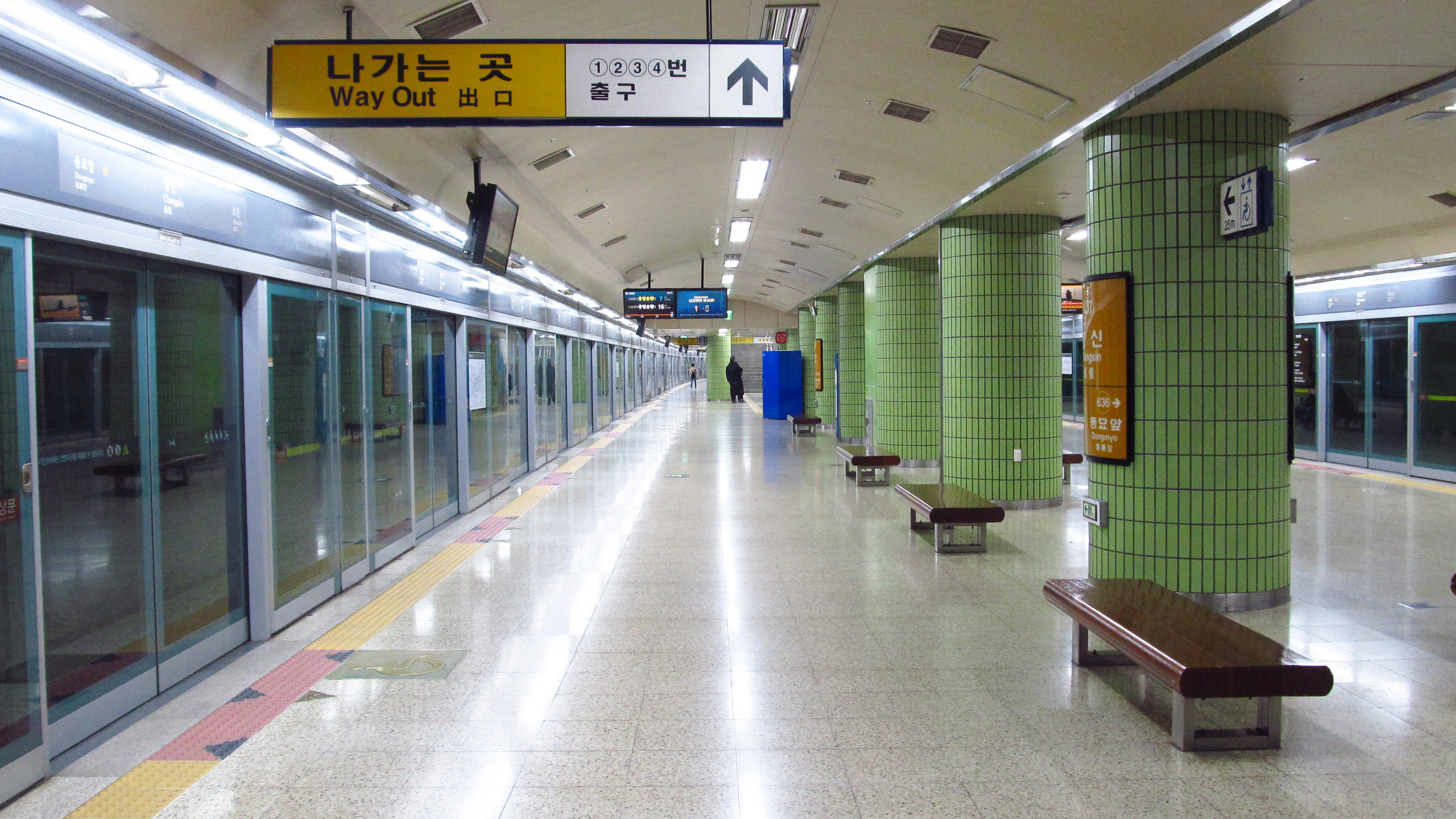

Korean name
- Hangul: 창신역
- Hanja: 昌信驛
- Revised Romanization: Changsin-yeok
- McCune–Reischauer: Ch'angsin-yŏk

General information
- Location: 20 Changsin-dong, 112 Jibongno Jiha, Jongno-gu, Seoul
- Operated by: Seoul Metro
- Line: Line 6
- Platforms: 1
- Tracks: 2

Construction
- Structure type: Underground

Key dates
- December 15, 2000: Line 6 opened
Location

Changsin Station is a subway station on Line 6 of the Seoul Metropolitan Subway. This station is much closer to Hansung University than the Line 4 station named after it.

== Station layout ==
G	Street level	Exit

L1; Concourse	Lobby	Customer Service, Shops, Vending machines, ATMs

L2; Platform level	Westbound	← Line 6 toward Eungam (Dongmyo)
L2; Platform level	Island platform, doors will open on the left
L2; Platform level	Eastbound	Line 6 toward Sinnae (Bomun) →

== Vicinity ==
- Exit 1 : Changsin Elementary School
- Exit 2 : Hansung University
- Exit 3 : Dongshin Elementary School
- Exit 4 : Sungin Park

Preceding station	Seoul Metropolitan Subway	Following station
Dongmyo towards Eungam	Line 6	Bomun towards Sinnae
