= Gyeongbokgung station =

Metro station in Seoul, South Korea

경복궁 (정부서울청사); Gyeongbokgung (Government Complex-Seoul)
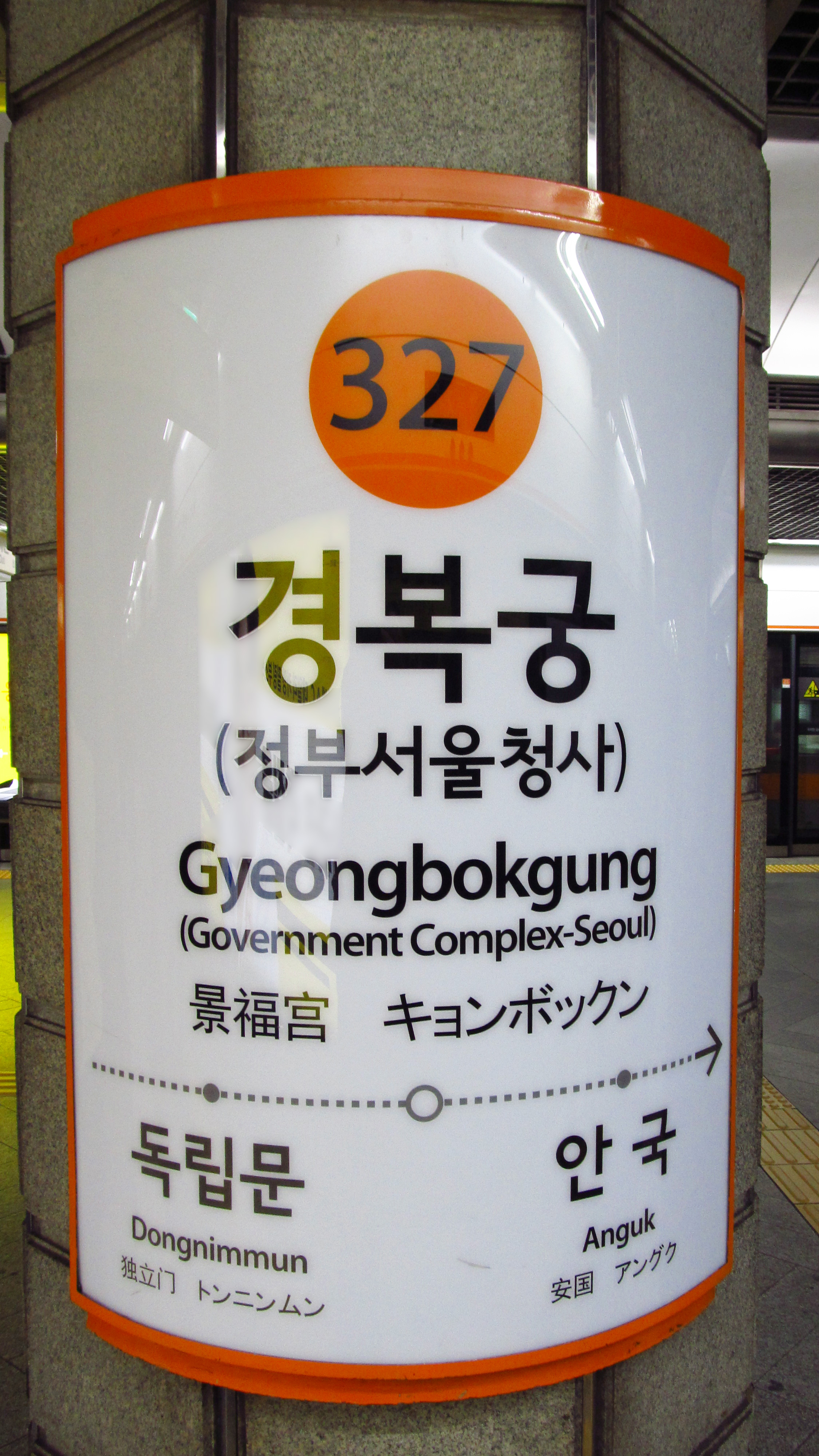

Korean name
- Hangul: 경복궁역
- Hanja: 景福宮驛
- Revised Romanization: Gyeongbokgungnyeok
- McCune–Reischauer: Kyŏngbokkungnyŏk

General information
- Location: 81-1 Jeokseon-dong, 130 Sajingno Jiha, Jongno-gu, Seoul
- Coordinates: 37°34′33″N 126°58′25″E
- Operated by: Seoul Metro
- Line(s): Line 3
- Platforms: 1
- Tracks: 2

Construction
- Structure type: Underground

Key dates
- October 18, 1985: Line 3 opened

Passengers
- (Daily) Based on Jan-Dec of 2012. Line 3: 46,531

Gyeongbokgung station (Korean: 경복궁역) is a subway station on Line 3 of the Seoul Metropolitan Subway. It is the subway station nearest to the Gyeongbokgung Palace. The station is also near the Government Complex–Seoul, the National Police Agency of South Korea, and other administrative buildings in the neighborhood.

== Station layout ==
G	Street level	Exit

L1; Concourse	Lobby	Customer service, shops, vending machines, ATMs

L2; Platform	Northbound	← Line 3 toward Daehwa (Dongnimmun)
L2; Platform	Island platform, doors will open on the left
L2; Platform	Southbound	Line 3 toward Ogeum (Anguk) →

== Vicinity ==
- Exit 1: Sajik Park
- Exit 2: Hyoja-dong
- Exit 3: Chinese Embassy of Korea
- Exit 4: Cheongwadae
- Exit 5: Gyeongbok Palace, Gwanghwamun
- Exit 6: Government Complex-Seoul, Gwanghwamun Station
- Exit 7: Seoul Metropolitan Police Agency

== Tourism ==
The station displays artifacts from various dynasties, with walls decorated in ornate displays design to appeal to tourists.

In January 2013, the Seoul Metropolitan Rapid Transit Corporation, which operates this line, published free guidebooks in three languages: English, Japanese and Chinese (simplified and traditional), which features eight tours as well as recommendations for accommodations, restaurants and shopping centers. The tours are designed with different themes, e.g. Korean traditional culture, which goes from Jongno 3-ga Station to Anguk Station and this station on line No 3 that showcases antique shops and art galleries of Insa-dong.

== Gallery ==
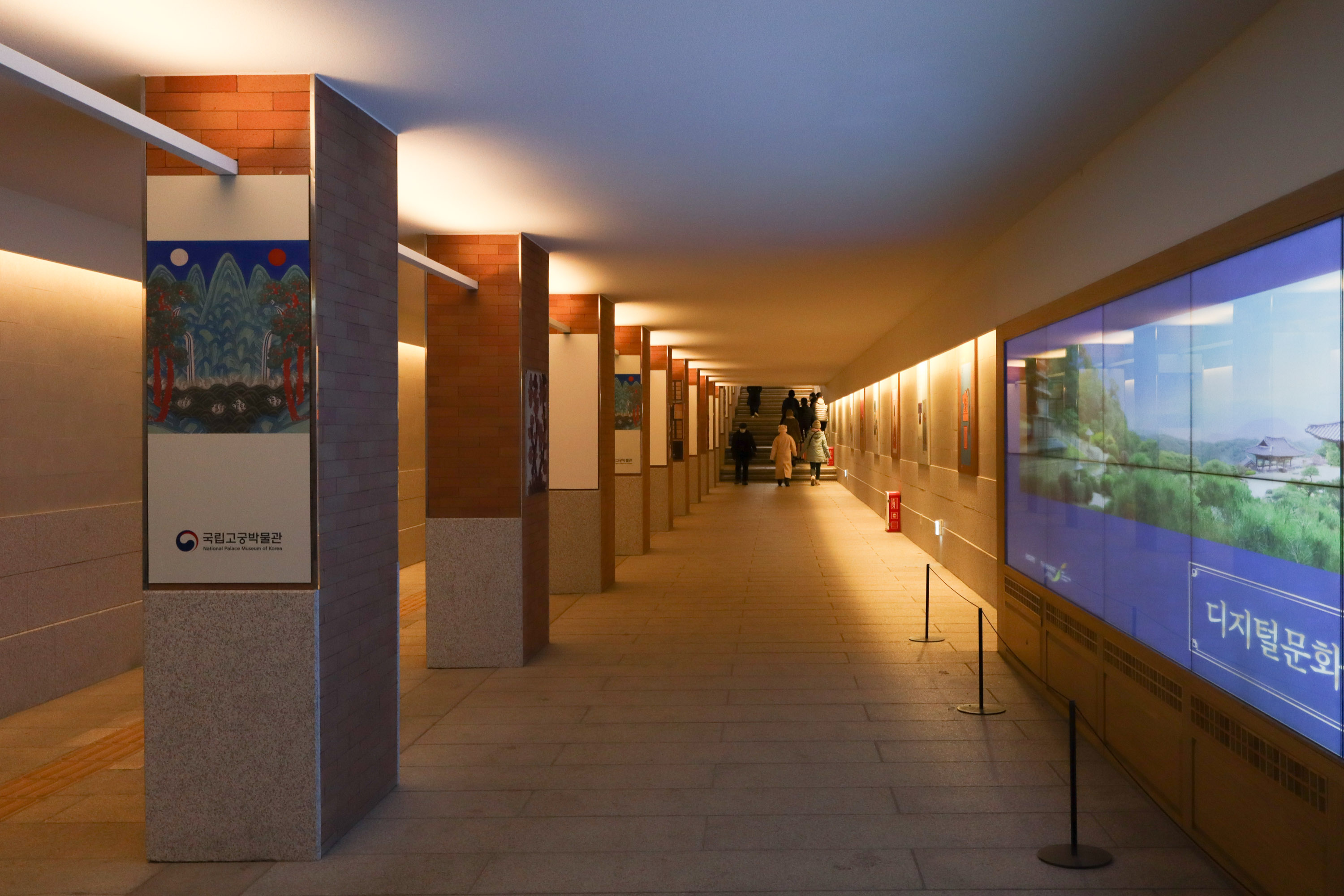

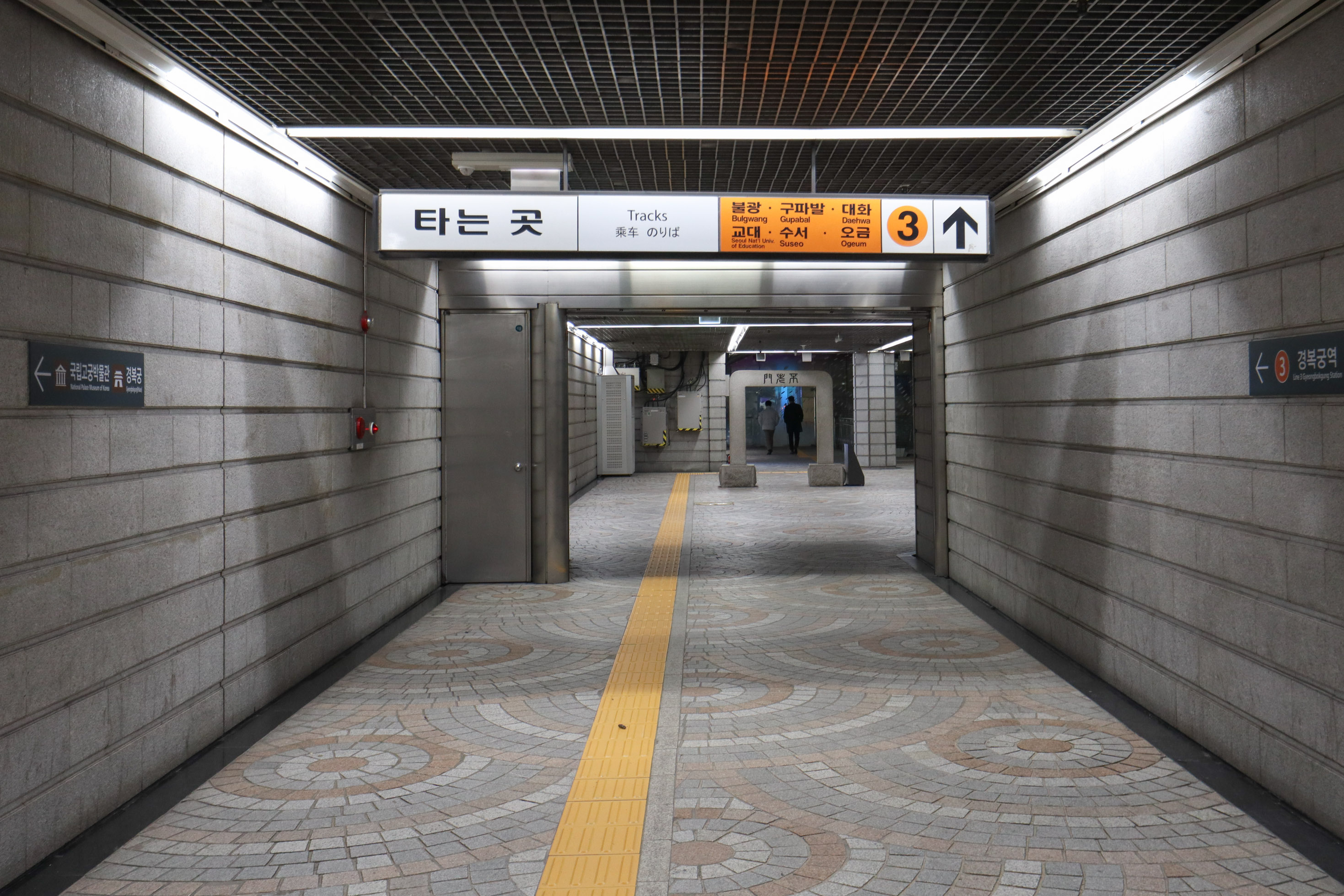

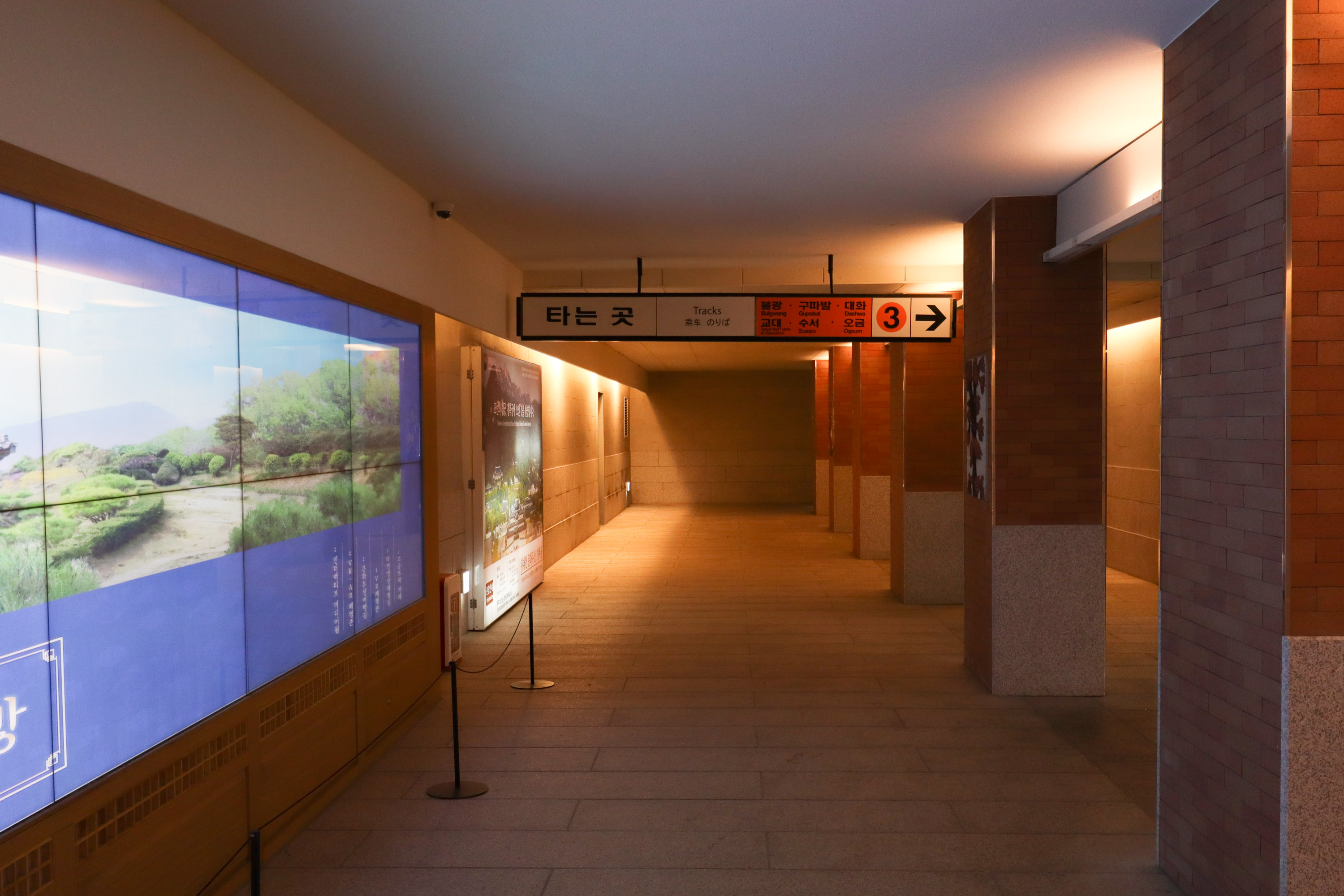

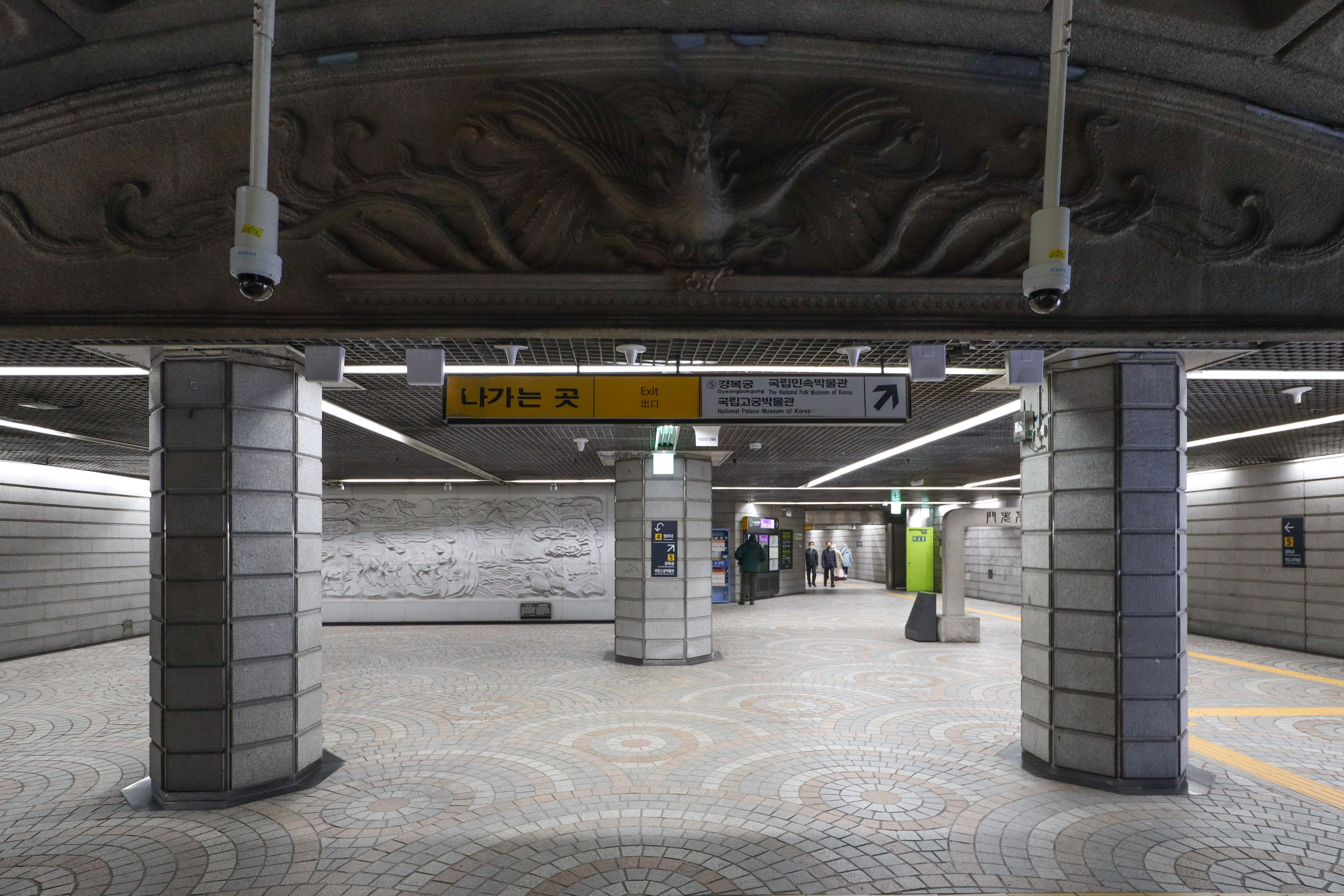

Preceding station	Seoul Metropolitan Subway	Following station
Dongnimmun towards Daehwa	Line 3	Anguk towards Ogeum
