= Dongdaemun station =

Train station in South Korea

Coordinates: 37°34′14″N 127°00′30″E

동대문; Dongdaemun
동대문; Dongdaemun
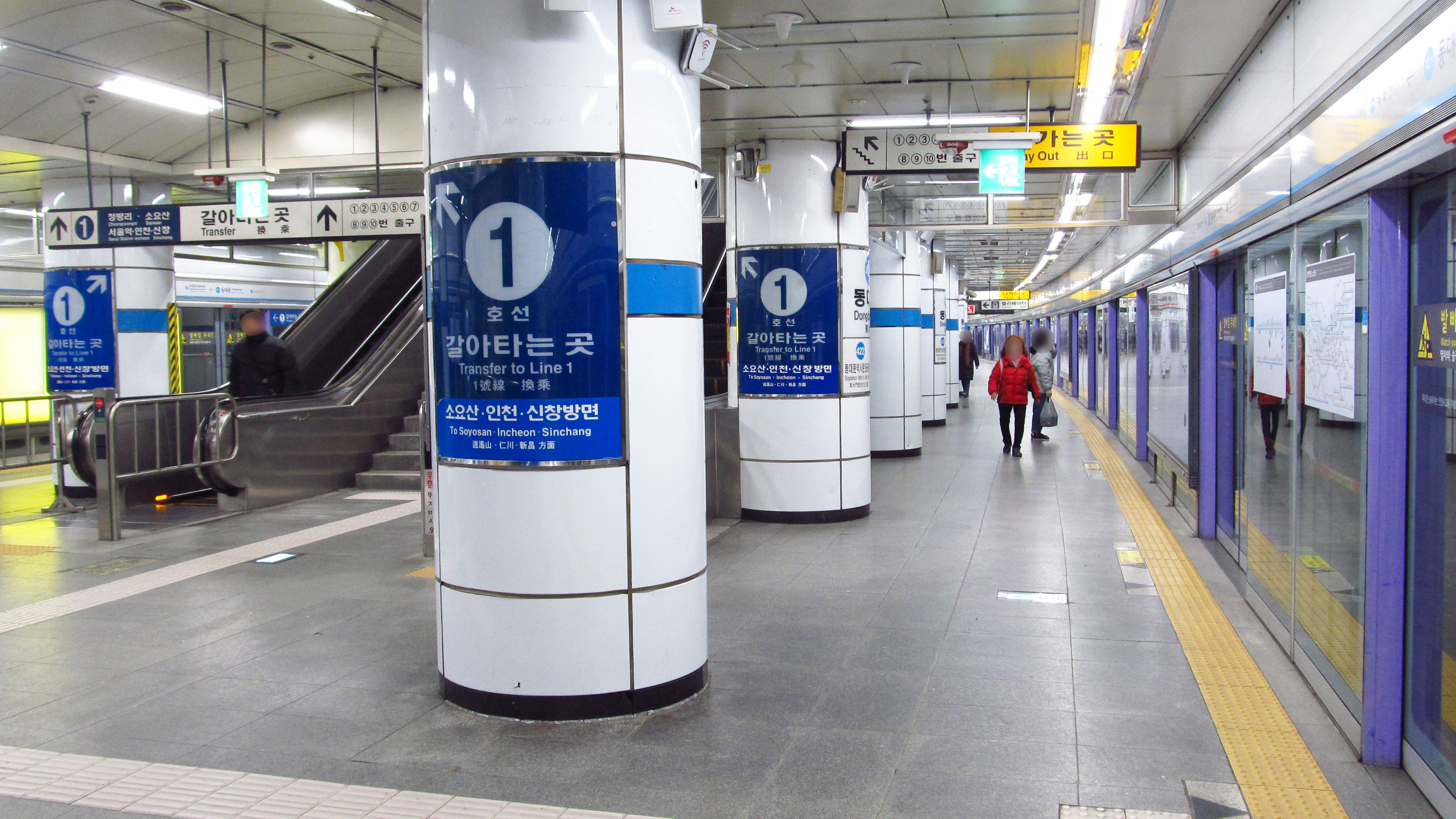
- Station Platform (Line 4)

Korean name
- Hangul: 동대문역
- Hanja: 東大門驛
- RR: Dongdaemun-yeok
- MR: Tongdaemun-yŏk

General information
- Location: 552 Changsin 1-dong, 302 Jongno Jiha, Jongno-gu, Seoul
- Operator: Seoul Metro
- Lines: Line 1 Line 4
- Platforms: 3
- Tracks: 4

Construction
- Structure type: Underground

Key dates
- August 15, 1974: Line 1 opened
- October 18, 1985: Line 4 opened

Passengers
- (Daily) Based on Jan-Dec of 2012. Line 1: 34,446; Line 4: 55,294
Services
Preceding station	Seoul Metropolitan Subway	Following station
Dongmyo towards Kwangwoon University or Yeoncheon	Line 1	Jongno 5(o)-ga towards Incheon, Seodongtan or Sinchang
Dongmyo towards Dongducheon	Line 1 Gyeongwon Express	Jongno 5(o)-ga towards Incheon
Dongmyo towards Cheongnyangni	Line 1 Gyeongbu Express	Jongno 5(o)-ga towards Sinchang
Hyehwa towards Jinjeop	Line 4	Dongdaemun History & Culture Park towards Oido
Location

Dongdaemun station (Korean: 동대문역) station is a station on Line 1 and Line 4 of the Seoul Metropolitan Subway. Sometimes called Dong Station, it is named after one of the Four Great Gates of the circular wall surrounding ancient Seoul, and is situated on the eastern end of Jongno ("Bell Street"). This station is also close to Dongdaemun Market.

In December 2010 the station is recorded as having the third highest WiFi data consumption of all the Seoul Metropolitan Subway stations, following Express Bus Terminal station, Sadang station, and followed by Jamsil station and Jongno 3(sam)-ga station.

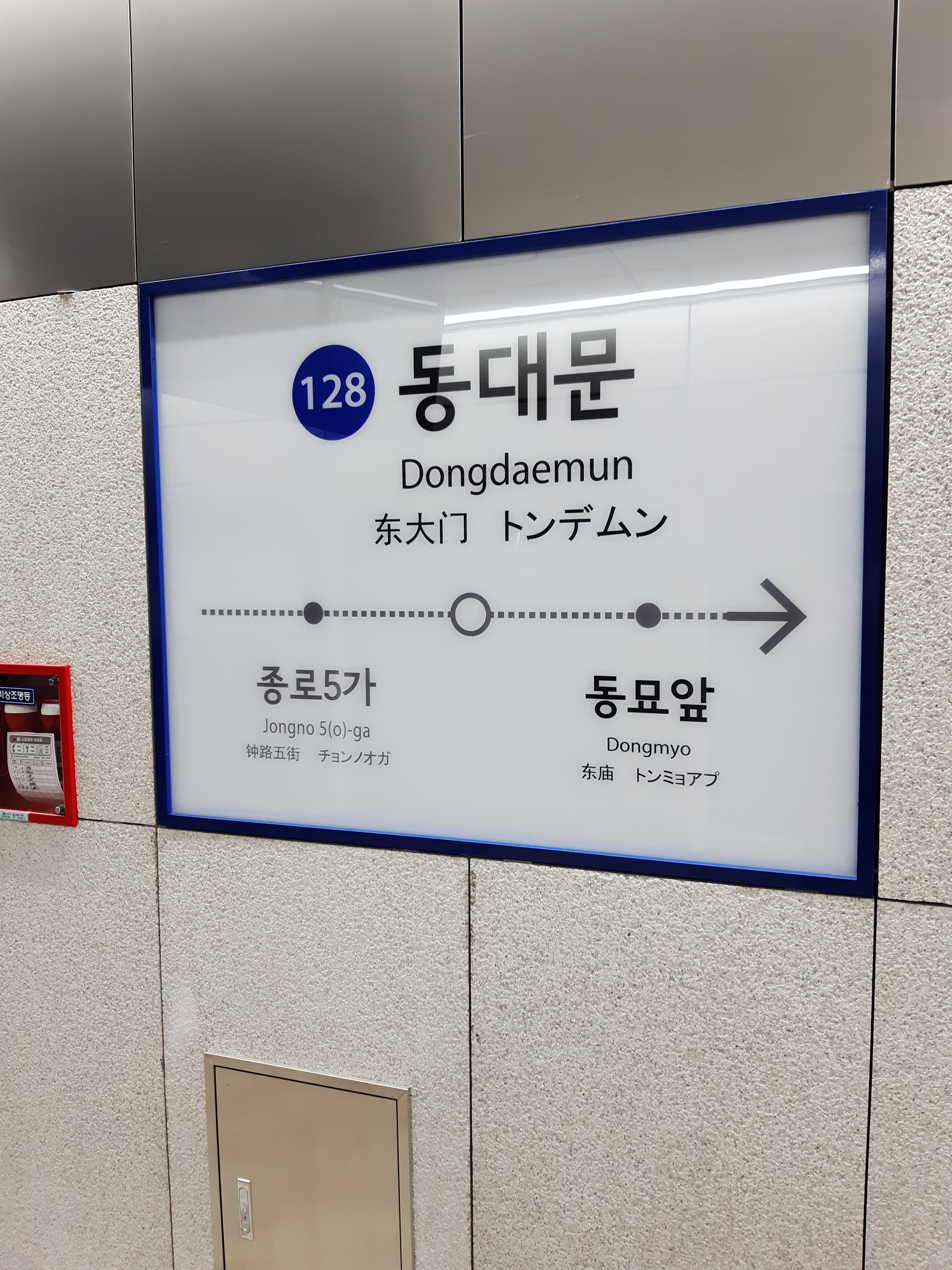
Line 1 station nameplate

== Station layout ==
G	Street level	Exit

L1; Concourse	Lobby	Customer Service, Shops, Vending machines, ATMs

L2; Line 1 platforms	Side platform, doors will open on the left
L2; Line 1 platforms	Southbound	Line 1 toward Incheon, Seodongtan or Sinchang (Jongno 5(o)-ga) →
L2; Line 1 platforms	Northbound	← Line 1 toward Kwangwoon University or Yeoncheon (Dongmyo)
L2; Line 1 platforms	Side platform, doors will open on the left

L2; Line 4 platforms	Northbound	← Line 4 toward Jinjeop (Hyehwa)
L2; Line 4 platforms	Island platform, doors will open on the left
L2; Line 4 platforms	Southbound	Line 4 toward Oido (Dongdaemun History & Culture Park) →

== Vicinity ==
- Changsin-dong Toy Wholesale Market - the largest toy and stationery market in Korea since 1975
- Seoul City Wall Museum
