= Dongmyo station =

Station on the Seoul Subway Line 1 and Line 6

Coordinates: 37°34′19″N 127°00′51″E

동묘앞; Dongmyo
동묘앞; Dongmyo
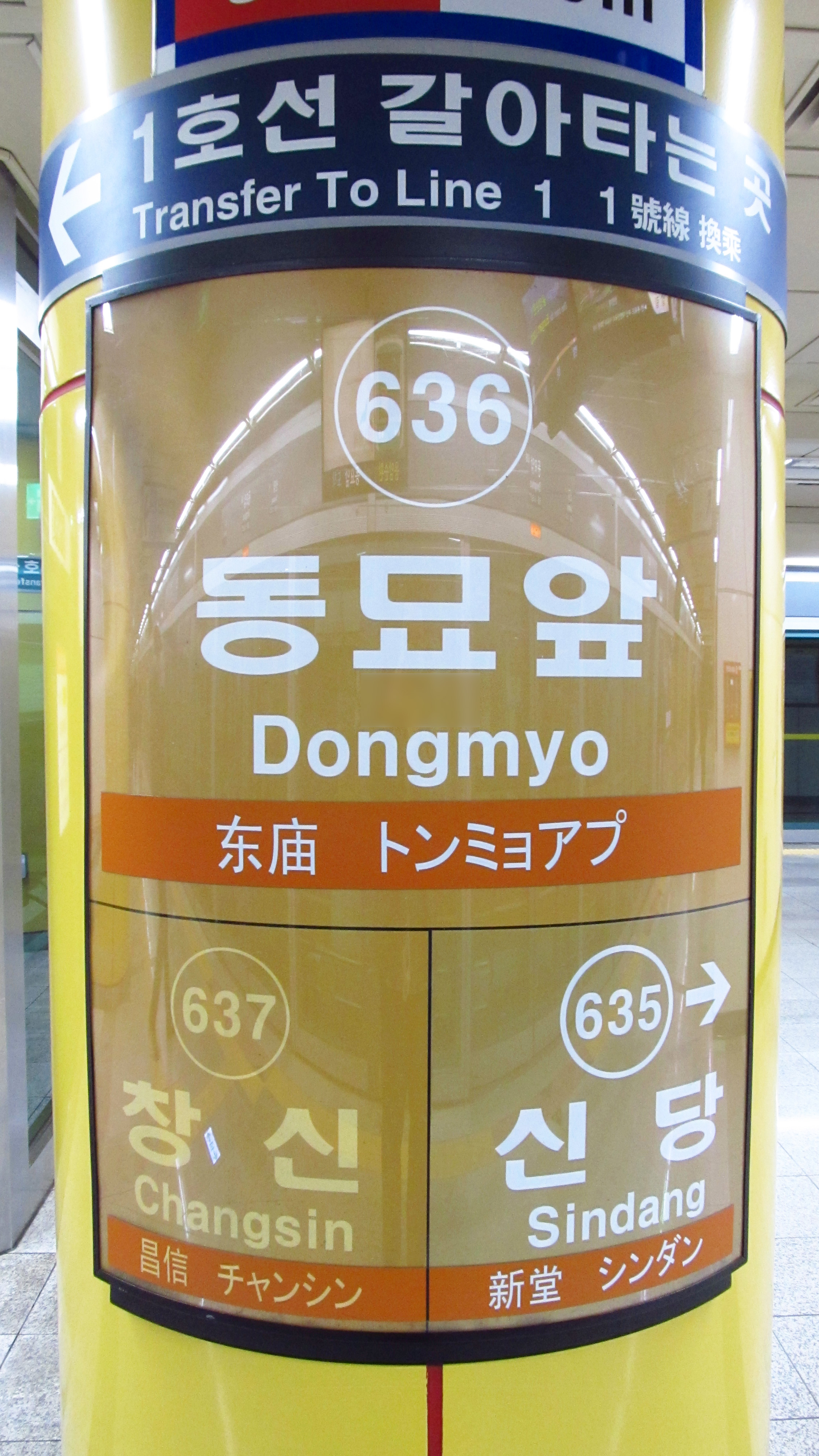
- Station nameplate (Line 6)

Korean name
- Hangul: 동묘앞역
- Hanja: 東廟앞驛
- Revised Romanization: Dongmyoap-yeok
- McCune–Reischauer: Tongmyoap-yŏk

General information
- Location: 117 Sungin-dong, 359 Jongno Jiha, Jongno-gu, Seoul
- Operator: Seoul Metro
- Lines: Line 1 Line 6
- Platforms: 3
- Tracks: 4

Construction
- Structure type: Underground

History
- Opened: December 21, 2005; December 15, 2000
Services
Preceding station	Seoul Metropolitan Subway	Following station
Sinseol-dong towards Kwangwoon University or Yeoncheon	Line 1	Dongdaemun towards Incheon, Seodongtan or Sinchang
Sinseol-dong towards Dongducheon	Line 1 Gyeongwon Express	Dongdaemun towards Incheon
Sinseol-dong towards Cheongnyangni	Line 1 Gyeongbu Express	Dongdaemun towards Sinchang
Sindang towards Eungam	Line 6	Changsin towards Sinnae
Location

Dongmyo Station is a station on the Seoul Subway Line 1 and Line 6. It is named after a nearby shrine, built during the Joseon dynasty to honor Guan Yu, arguably the most famous Chinese military general from the Three Kingdoms era.

Seoul Metro trains on Line 1 that are serviced at the Gunja Train Depot behind Yongdap Station operate up to this station, before taking a track that connects to Sinseol-dong Station on Line 2.

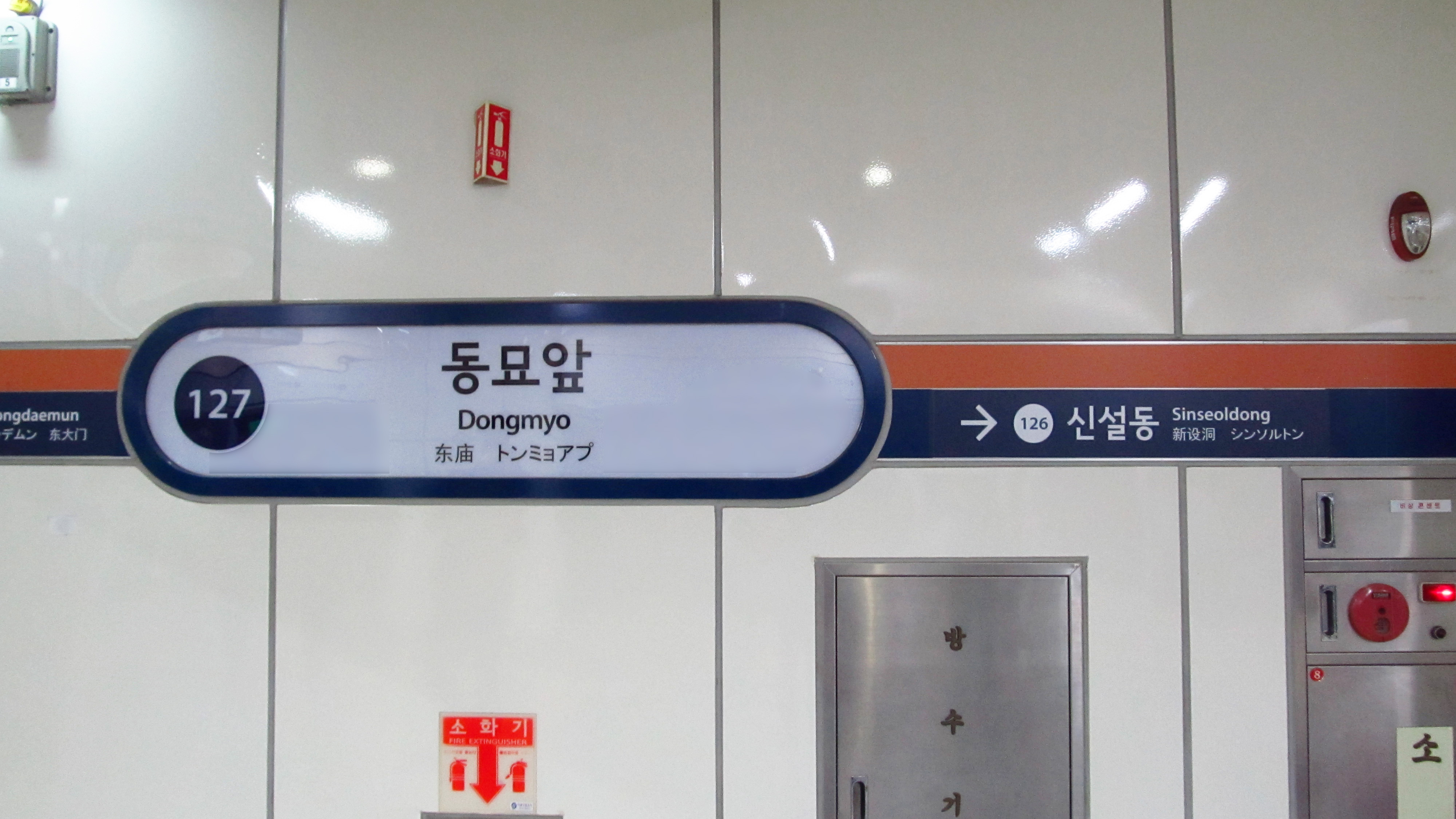
Station nameplate (Line 1)

== Station layout ==
G	Street level	Exit

L1; Concourse	Lobby	Customer Service, Shops, Vending machines, ATMs

L2; Line 1 platforms	Side platform, doors will open on the left
L2; Line 1 platforms	Southbound	Line 1 toward Incheon, Seodongtan or Sinchang (Dongdaemun) →
L2; Line 1 platforms	Northbound	← Line 1 toward Kwangwoon University or Yeoncheon (Sinseol-dong)
L2; Line 1 platforms	Side platform, doors will open on the left

L3; Line 6 platforms	Westbound	← Line 6 toward Eungam (Sindang)
L3; Line 6 platforms	Island platform, doors will open on the left
L3; Line 6 platforms	Eastbound	Line 6 toward Sinnae (Changsin) →

== Vicinity ==
- Exit 1 : Sungin Park
- Exit 3 : Dongmyo
- Exit 4 : Changsin Elementary School
- Exit 8 : Dongdaemun
- Exit 9 : Doosan APT
