= Seoul Metropolitan Rapid Transit Corporation =

South Korean company

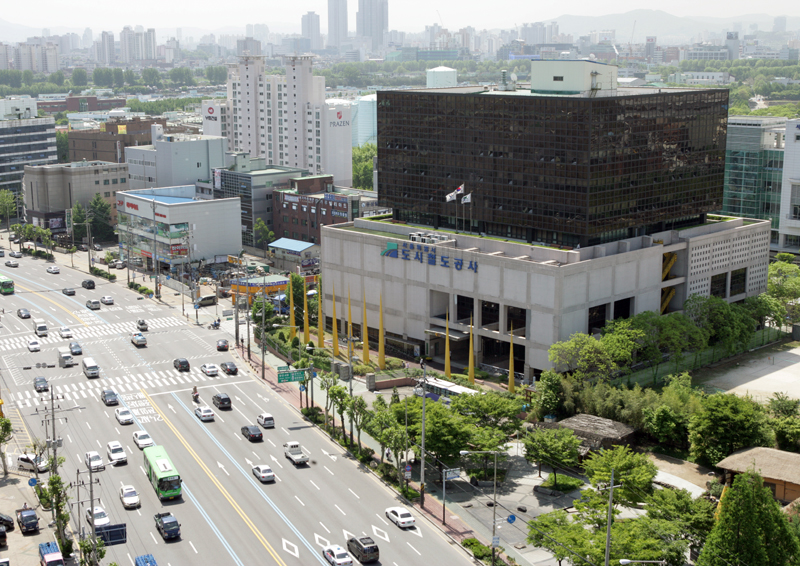
- Head office (2009)
- Company type: Municipal-owned corporation
- Industry: Rapid transit
- Founded: March 1994
- Defunct: May 31, 2017
- Fate: Merged with Seoul Metro Corporation
- Successor: Seoul Transportation Corporation
- Headquarters: Seongdong-gu, Seoul, South Korea
- Key people: Kim Tae-ho (CEO, 2014–2017)
- Number of employees: 6,450

- Seoul Metropolitan Rapid Transit Corporation
- Hangul: 서울특별시 도시철도공사
- Hanja: 서울特別市 都市鐵道公社
- RR: Seoul-teukbyeolsi dosi cheoldo gongsa
- MR: Sŏul-t'ŭkpyŏlsi tosi ch'ŏlto kongsa

Seoul Metropolitan Rapid Transit Corporation (SMRT) was established in 1994 to operate the Seoul Subway lines 5, 6, 7, 8 in Seoul, South Korea.

The corporation operated a total of 201 subway trains at 148 stations on lines 5-8. The operation intervals are from 2.5–6 minutes during rush hours and 5–10 minutes during non-rush hours. The combined daily ridership of subway lines 5-8 is 2,037,000.

The company merged with Seoul Metro in 2017.

== Lines ==
Seoul Subway Line 2: Kkachisan station

Seoul Subway Line 3: Garak Market station

Seoul Subway Line 5: Banghwa station - Sangil-dong station / Macheon Station (Except for Ogeum station controlled by Seoul Metro)

Seoul Subway Line 6: Eungam station - Bonghwasan station (Except for Yeonsinnae station controlled by Seoul Metro

Seoul Subway Line 7: Jangam station - Bupyeong-gu Office station

Seoul Subway Line 8: Amsa station - Moran station

== Administration ==
In January 2013, the Transit Corporation published free guidebooks in three languages: English, Japanese and Chinese (simplified and traditional), which features eight tours as well as recommendations for accommodations, restaurants and shopping centers. These were distributed from information centers in 44 subway stations, namely Itaewon Station on line 6 and Gwanghwamun Station on line 5. The eight tours are designed with different themes, e.g. Korean traditional culture. Which goes from Jongno 3-ga Station to Anguk Station and Gyeongbokgung Station on line No 3 that showcases antique shops and art galleries of Insa-dong.

== Stations ==
The stations for Lines 5-7 are designed to fit in 8 cars on each platform, however subway stations operated on Line 8 is designed to fit 6 cars on each platform. Most stations have 2 tracks, but can have 1 or 3 tracks in some cases. Each platform on every station operated by the Seoul Metropolitan Rapid Transit Corporation is equipped with a PSD, or Platform Screen Doors which help prevent suicide, and eliminate dust particles created by trains running in the tunnels. Each station's platform is also equipped with many large LCD television screens that are parallel to the Platform Screen Doors which displays the information on the trains locations, live news, and video instructions in case of an emergency. There are also 2 panels, covered with 2 large LCD television screens on each side of the panel (so a total of 4 screens on each flat panel, and there are 2 flat panels on each platform.) There is one display on each side of the panel that display the current time, arrival of the next two trains, at what door to transfer, (if at a transfer station) and the train's locations. The second screen displays advertisements, weather, and news. Regular panels without television screens attached to them serve as guides for exits, surrounding landmarks and exit locations and where the train will lead them to.

== See also ==
- Seoul Metropolitan Subway
- Korail, operator of lines 1, 3, 4, and most other lines
- Seoul Metro Corporation (once called SMSC), operator of lines 1-4
- Transportation in South Korea
