= Anguk station =

Station of the Seoul Metropolitan Subway

안국 (현대건설); Anguk (Hyundai E & C)
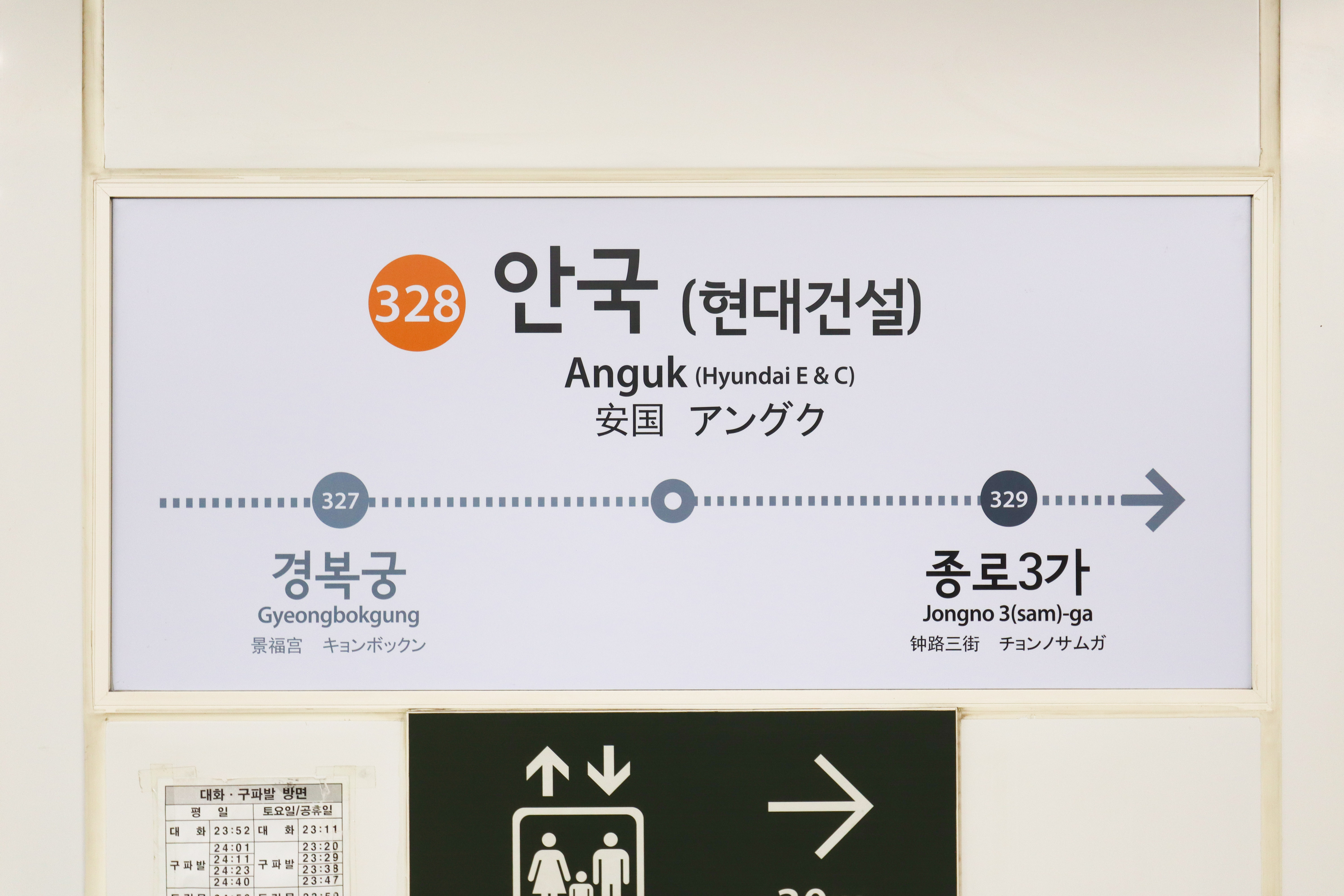

Korean name
- Hangul: 안국역
- Hanja: 安國驛
- RR: Anguk-yeok
- MR: An'guk-yŏk

General information
- Location: 148 Anguk-dong, 62 Yulgongno Jiha, Jongno District, Seoul
- Coordinates: 37°34′35″N 126°59′08″E
- Operator: Seoul Metro
- Line: Line 3
- Platforms: 1
- Tracks: 2

Construction
- Structure type: Underground

Key dates
- October 18, 1985: Line 3 opened

Passengers
- (Daily) Based on Jan-Dec of 2012. Line 3: 55,085
Location

Anguk station (Korean: 안국; Hanja: 安國), which has the subname Hyundai E & C (Korean: 현대건설), is a subway station on the Line 3 of the Seoul Metropolitan Subway. The station is located in the Anguk neighborhood of Jongno District, Seoul and is the nearest subway station to the Insa and Samcheong neighborhoods. The station is also near the ancient royal residence of Unhyeongung.

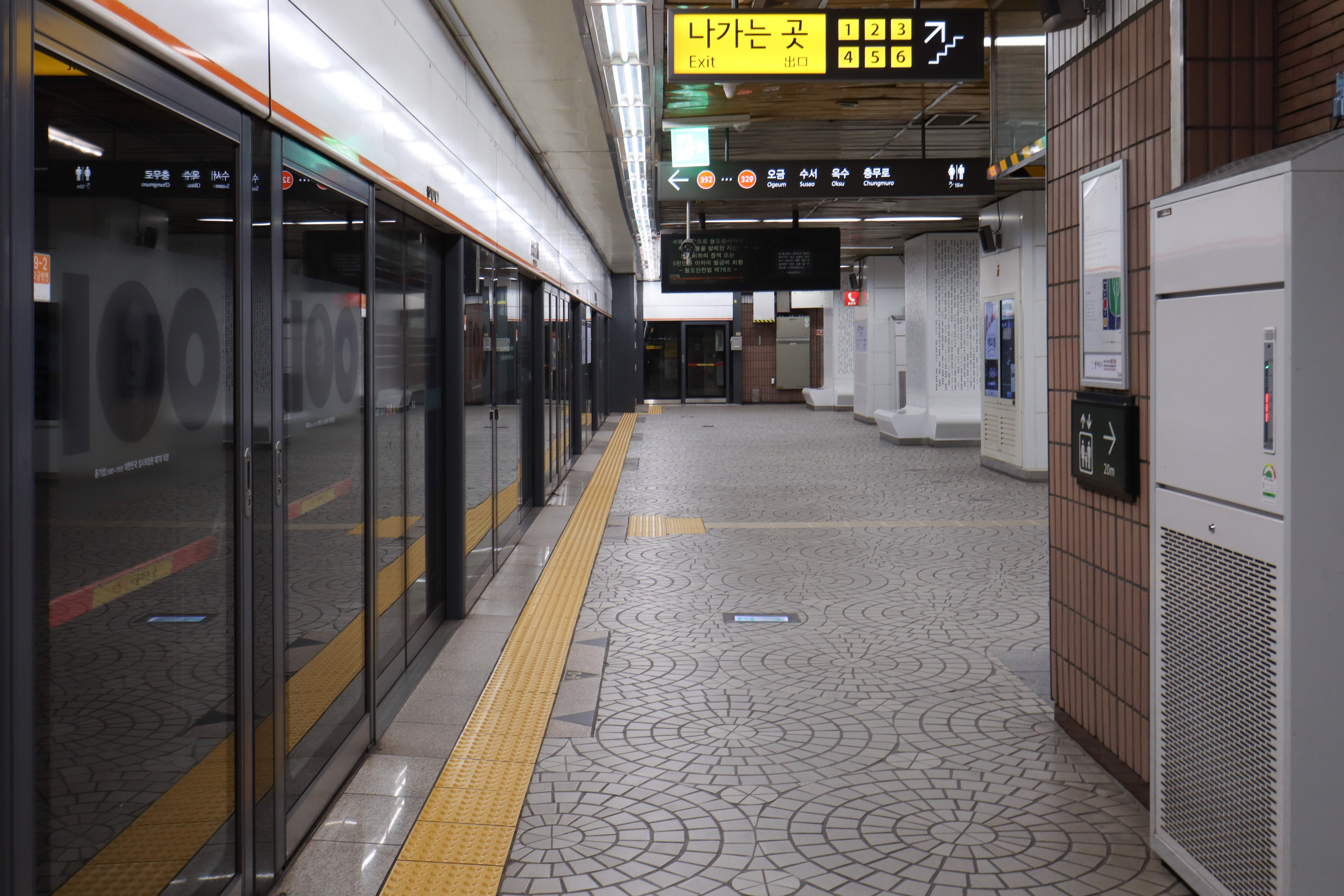

== Station layout ==
G	Street level	Exit

L1
Concourse
Lobby
Customer Service, Shops, Vending machines, ATMs

Automatic photo machines

L2; Platform	Northbound	← Line 3 toward Daehwa (Gyeongbokgung)
L2; Platform	Island platform, doors will open on the left
L2; Platform	Southbound	Line 3 toward Ogeum (Jongno 3(sam)-ga) →

== Vicinity ==
- Exit 1 : Deokseong Girls' Middle & High Schools. Jeongdok Public Library
- Exit 2 : Jaedong Elementary School
- Exit 3 : Changdeokgung, Hyundai Mobis Headquarters
- Exit 4 : Unhyeongung, Nakwon Sangka
- Exit 5 : Seoul Elderly Welfare Center
- Exit 6 : Jongno Police Station, Insadong

== Tourism ==
In January 2013, the Seoul Metropolitan Rapid Transit Corporation, which operates this line, published free guidebooks in three languages: English, Japanese and Chinese (simplified and traditional), which features eight tours as well as recommendations for accommodations, restaurants and shopping centers. The tours are designed with different themes, e.g. Korean traditional culture, which goes from Jongno 3-ga Station to this station and Gyeongbokgung Station on line No 3 that showcases antique shops and art galleries of Insa-dong.

In March 2018, Anguk Station of Seoul Subway Line 3 will be transformed into a history of independence movement themes for the first time in Korea.

Seoul City is the only one among 950 subway and urban railway stations nationwide to mark the 99 years of the March 1 Independence Movement theme history

The four-story platform section of Anguk Station will contain the achievements and quotations of 80 independence activists including Kim Gu, Ahn Jung-geun, Yoon Bong-gil, Yoo Gwan-sun and Lee Bong-chang. The second and third basement floors of this year will also be built with independence movement and temporary government as the theme of the exhibition and rest area.

== Gallery ==
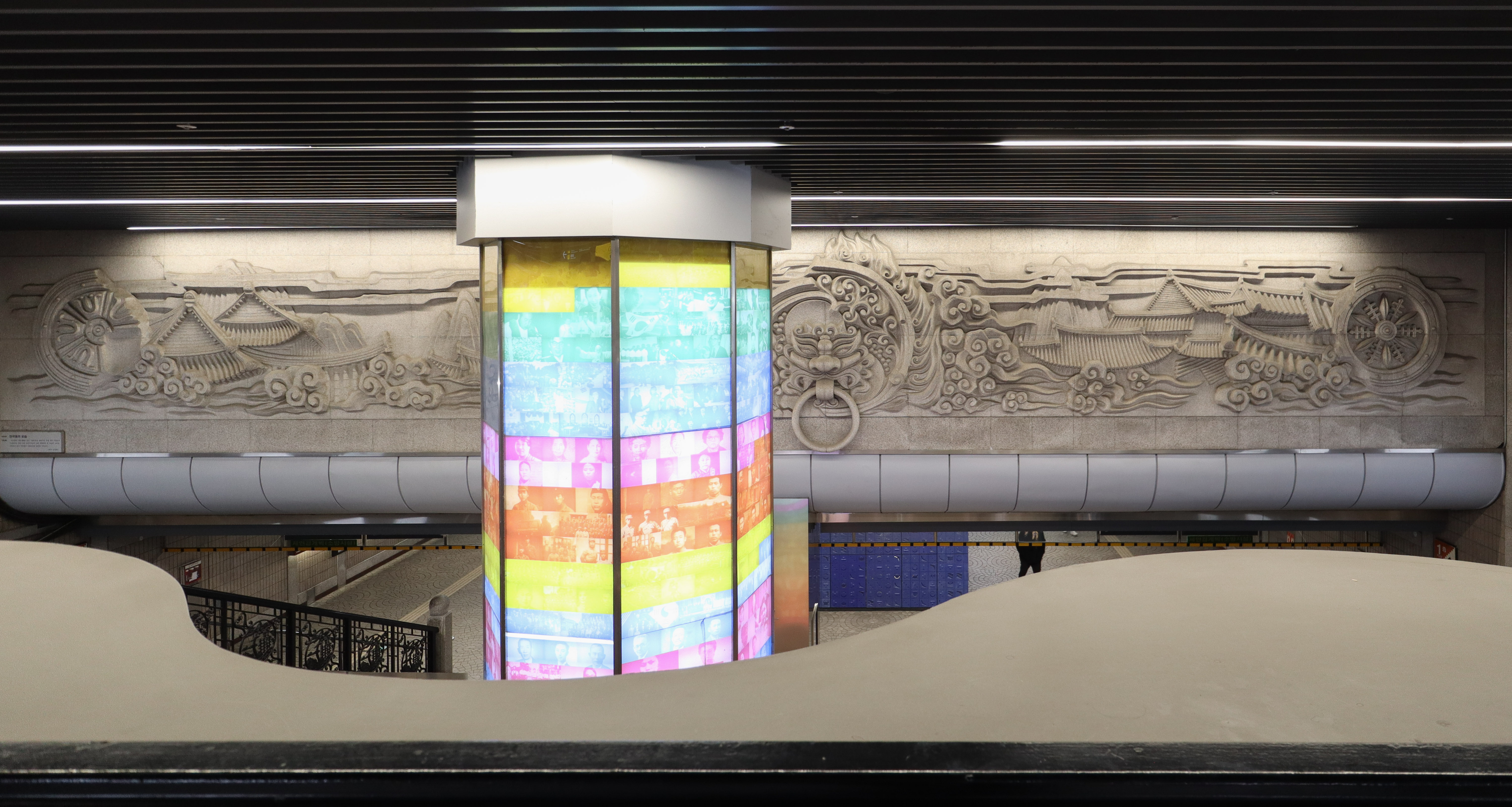

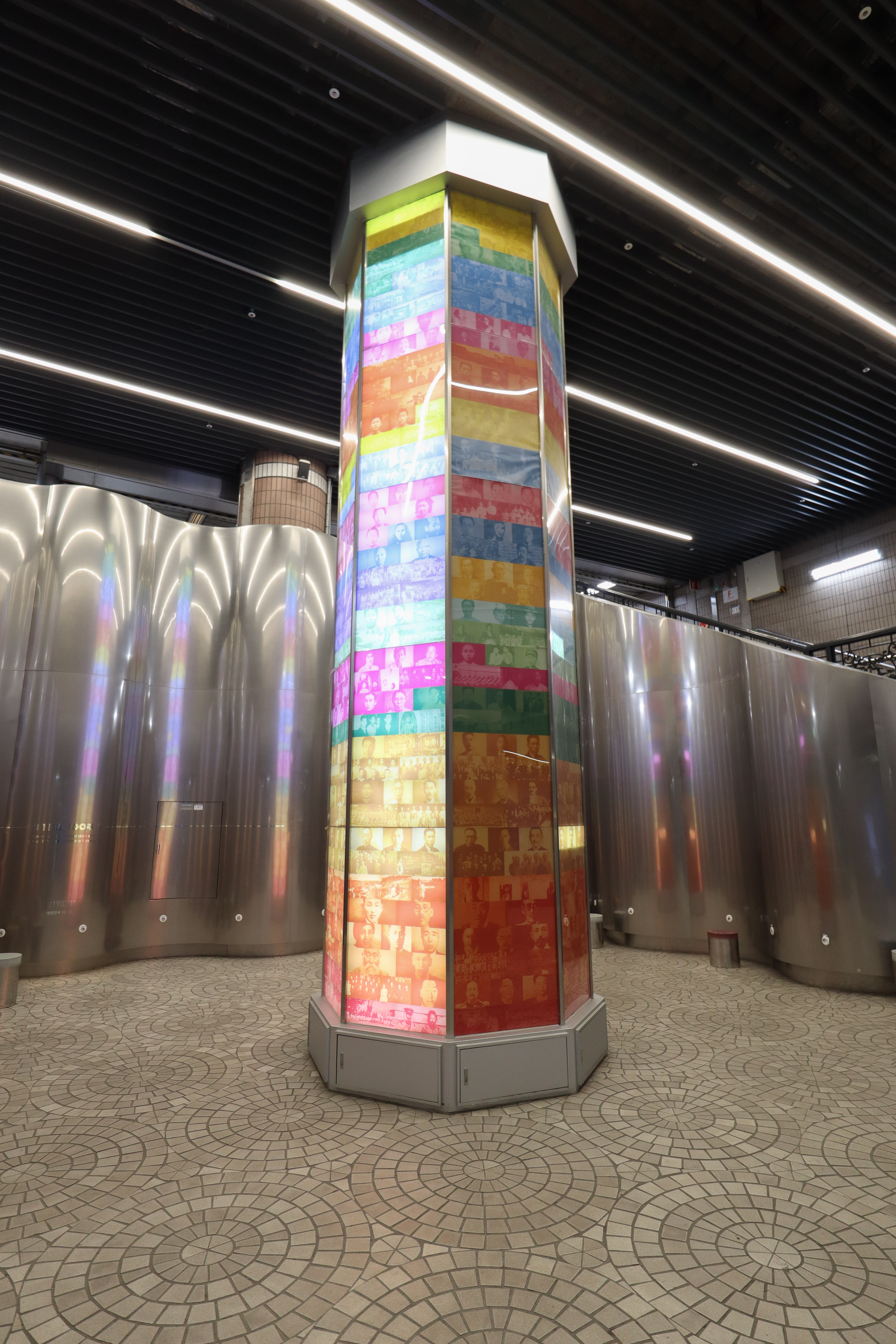

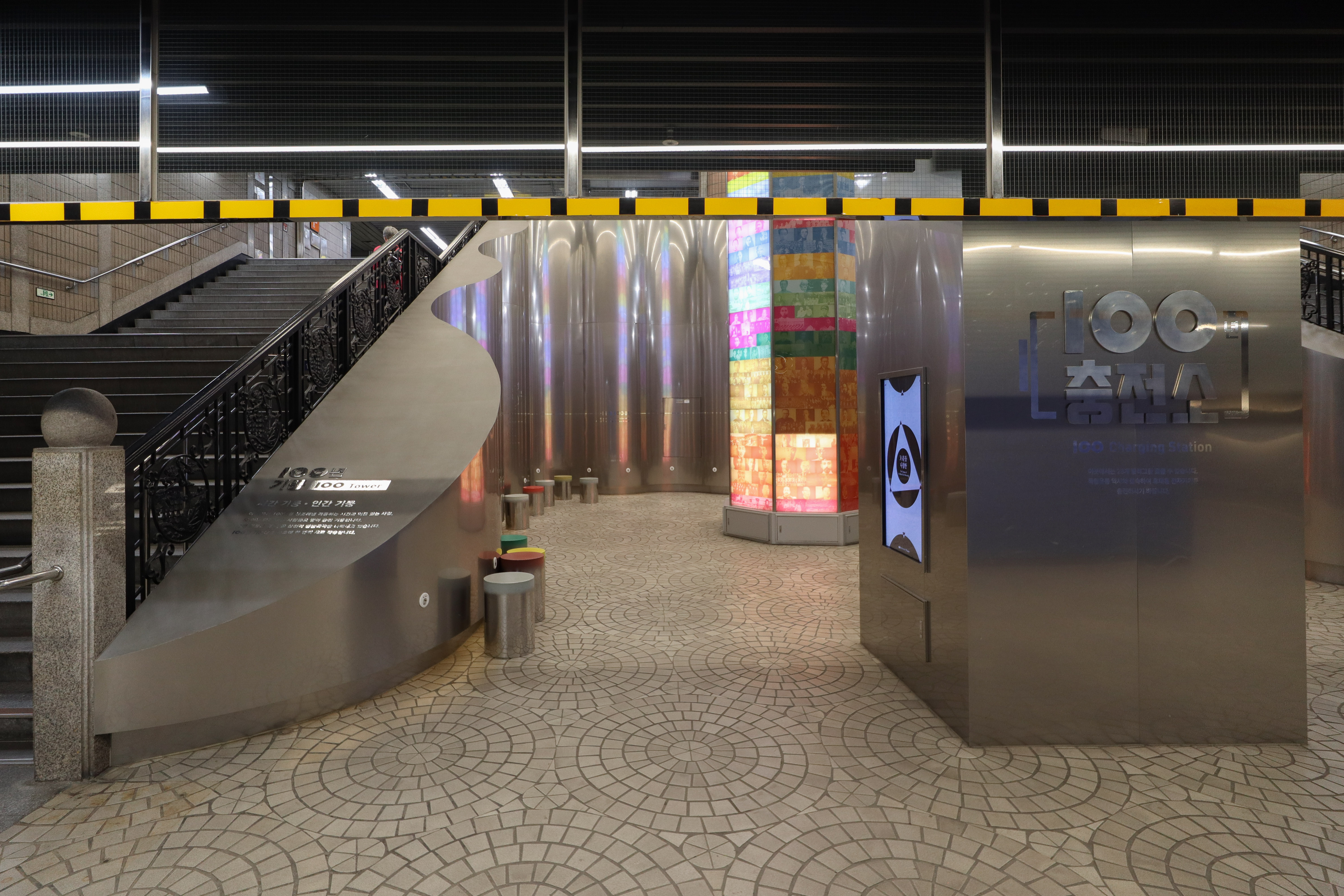

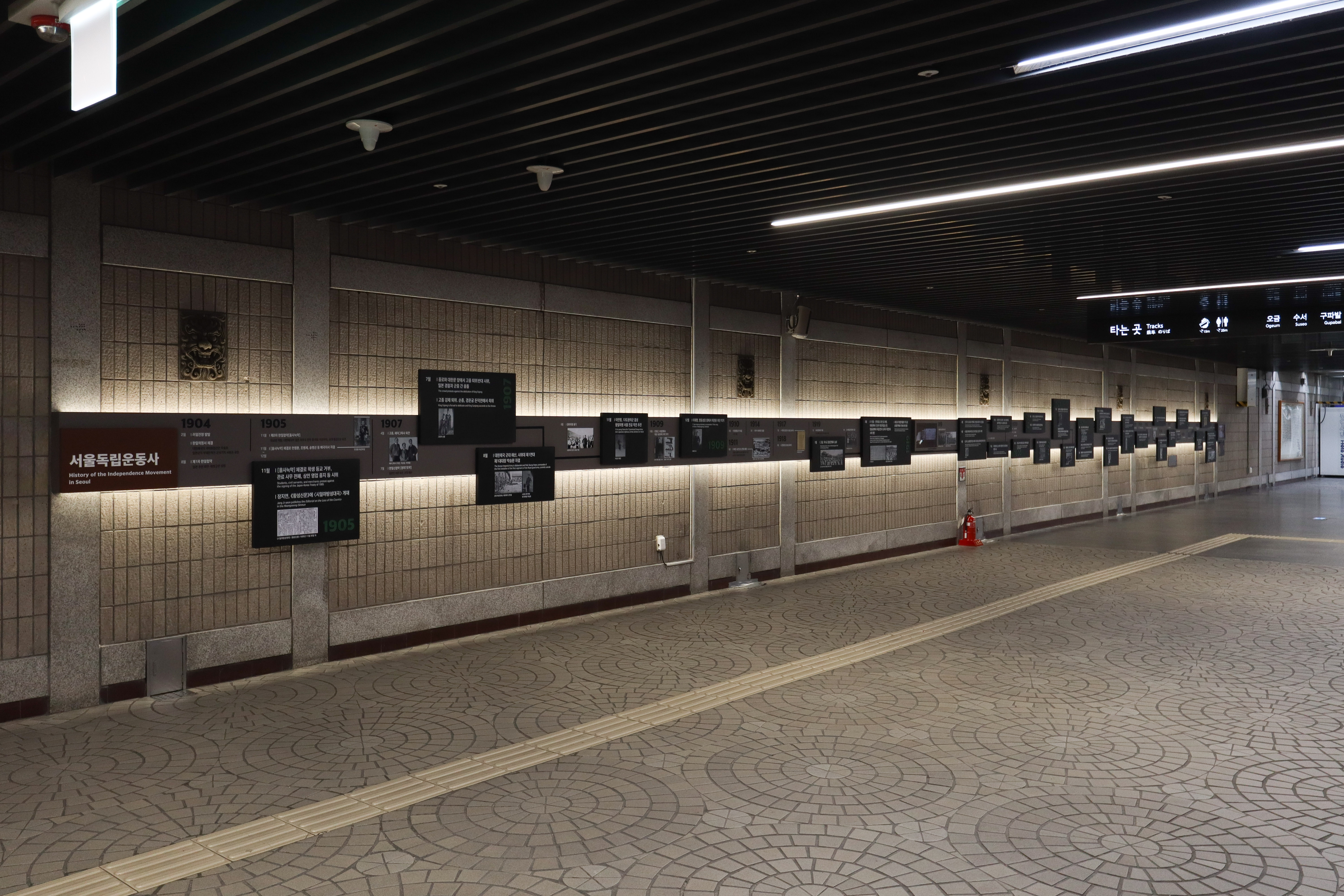

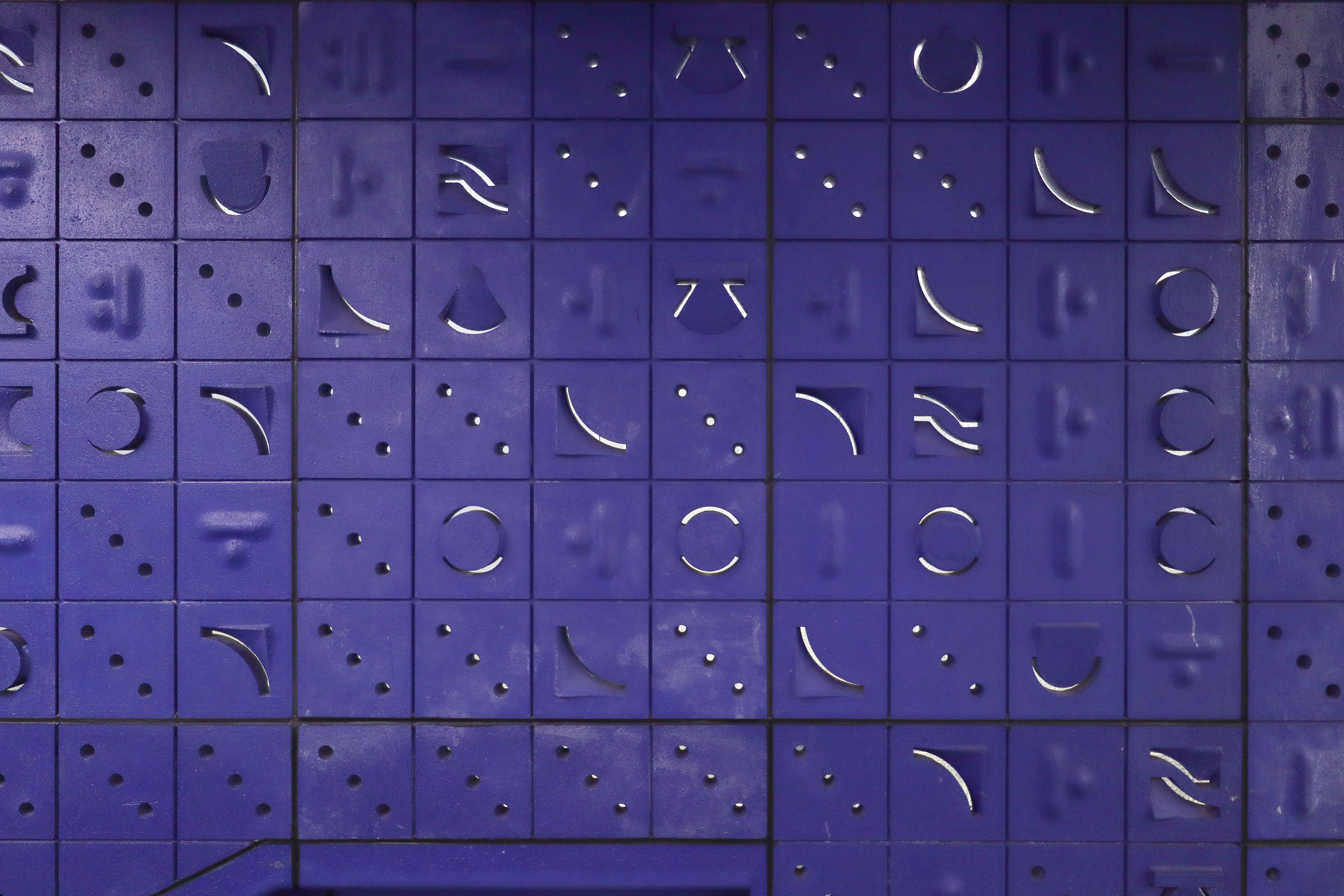

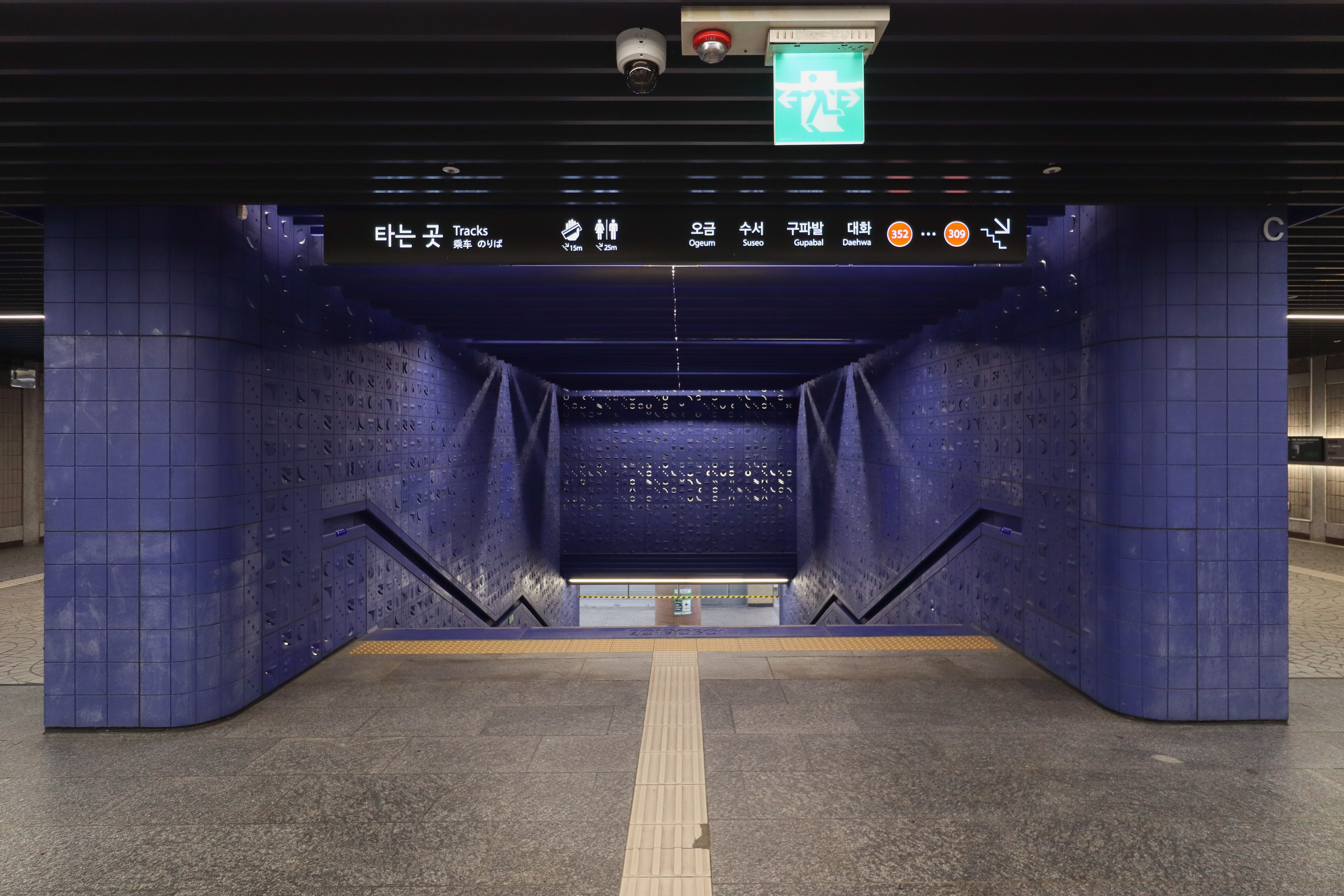

Preceding station	Seoul Metropolitan Subway	Following station
Gyeongbokgung towards Daehwa	Line 3	Jongno 3(sam)-ga towards Ogeum
