= Jongno 5(o)-ga station =

Metro station in Seoul, South Korea

Coordinates: 37°34′15″N 127°00′07″E

종로5가 (삼양그룹); Jongno 5(o)-ga (Samyang Group)
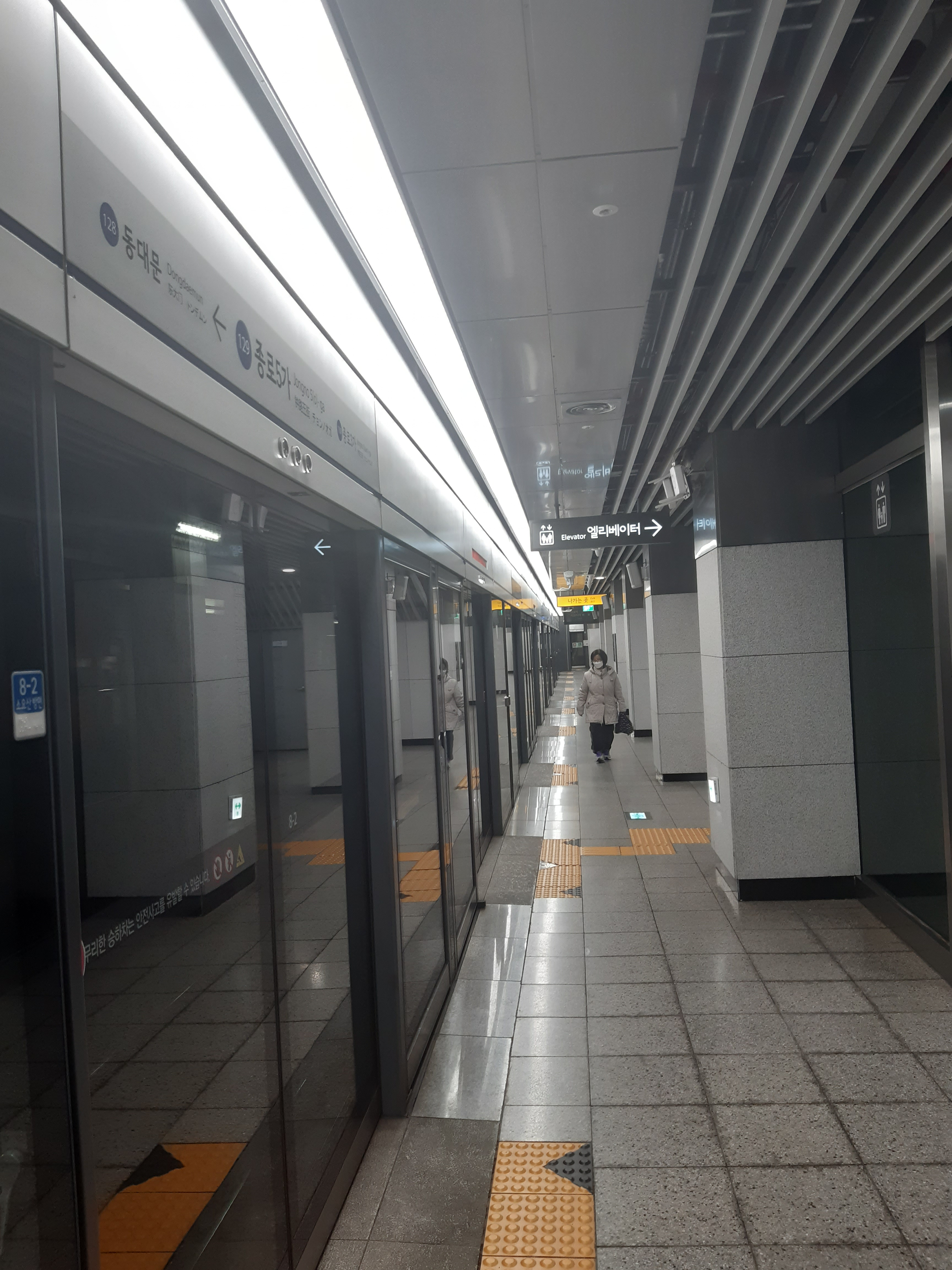
- Station platform

Korean name
- Hangul: 종로5가역
- Hanja: 鍾路五街驛
- Revised Romanization: Jongnooga-yeok
- McCune–Reischauer: Chongnooga-yŏk

General information
- Location: 124-8 Jongno 5-ga, 216 Jongno Jiha, Jongno-gu, Seoul
- Operator: Seoul Metro
- Line: Line 1
- Platforms: 2
- Tracks: 2

Construction
- Structure type: Underground

History
- Opened: August 15, 1974

Passengers
- (Daily) Based on Jan-Dec of 2012. Line 1: 53,228
Services
Preceding station	Seoul Metropolitan Subway	Following station
Dongdaemun towards Kwangwoon University or Yeoncheon	Line 1	Jongno 3(sam)-ga towards Incheon, Seodongtan or Sinchang
Dongdaemun towards Dongducheon	Line 1 Gyeongwon Express	Jongno 3(sam)-ga towards Incheon
Dongdaemun towards Cheongnyangni	Line 1 Gyeongbu Express	Jongno 3(sam)-ga towards Sinchang
Location

Jongno 5(o)-ga Station is a station on the Seoul Subway Line 1. It is located underneath Jongno, a major street in downtown Seoul.

== Station layout ==
G	Street level	Exit

L1; Concourse	Lobby	Customer Service, Shops, Vending machines, ATMs

L2; Line 1 platforms	Side platform, doors will open on the left
L2; Line 1 platforms	Southbound	Line 1 toward Incheon, Seodongtan or Sinchang (Jongno 3(sam)-ga) →
L2; Line 1 platforms	Northbound	← Line 1 toward Kwangwoon University or Yeoncheon (Dongdaemun)
L2; Line 1 platforms	Side platform, doors will open on the left

== Vicinity ==
- Exit 1 : Dongdaemun Police Station
- Exit 2 :
- Exit 3 : Hyoje Elementary School
- Exit 4 :
- Exit 5 :
- Exit 6 : Cheonggyecheon, Pyeonghwa Market
- Exit 7 : Cheonggyecheon
- Exit 8 : Dongdaemun Market

== Gallery ==
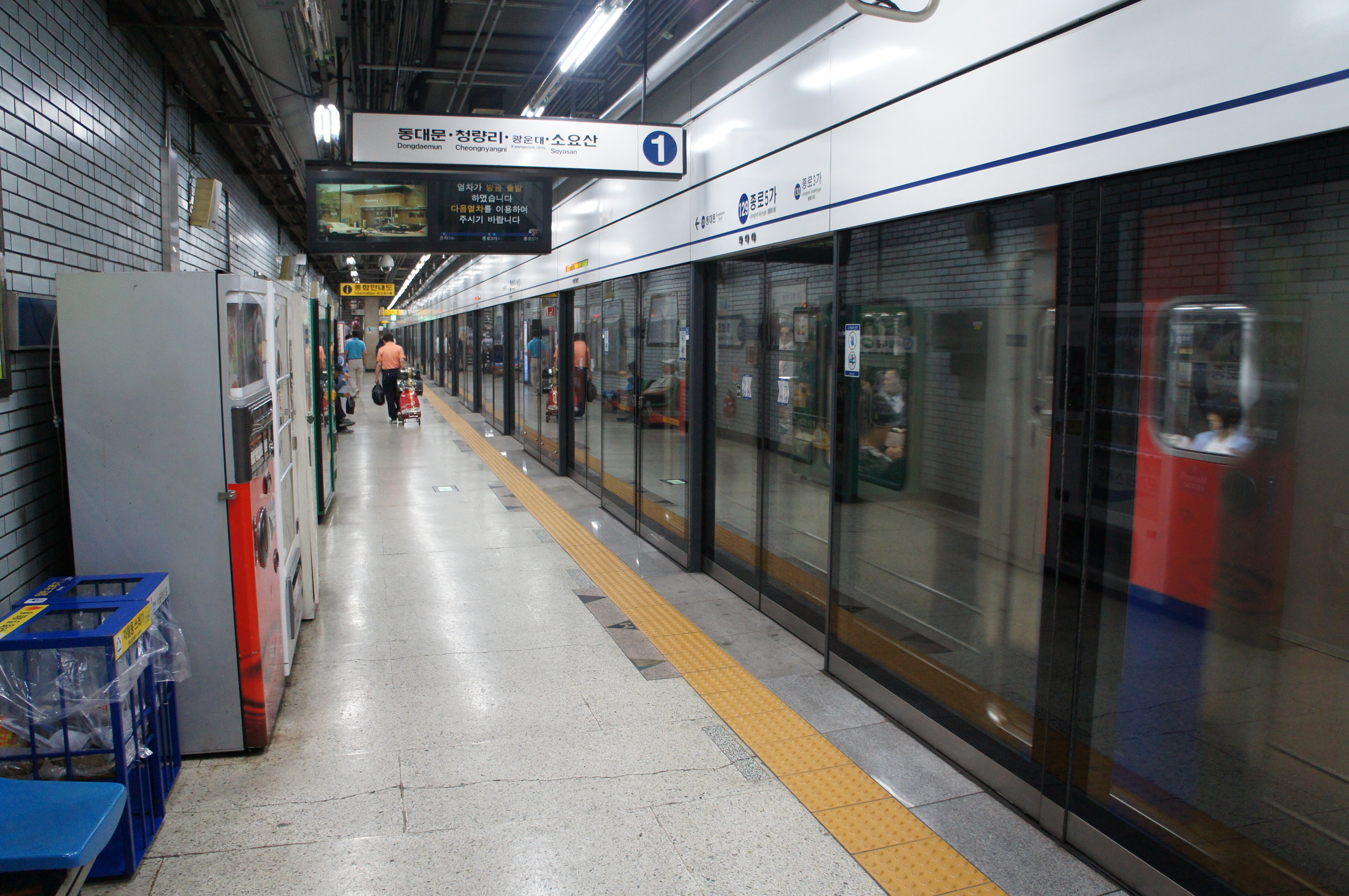
Jongno 5(o)-ga station 2014

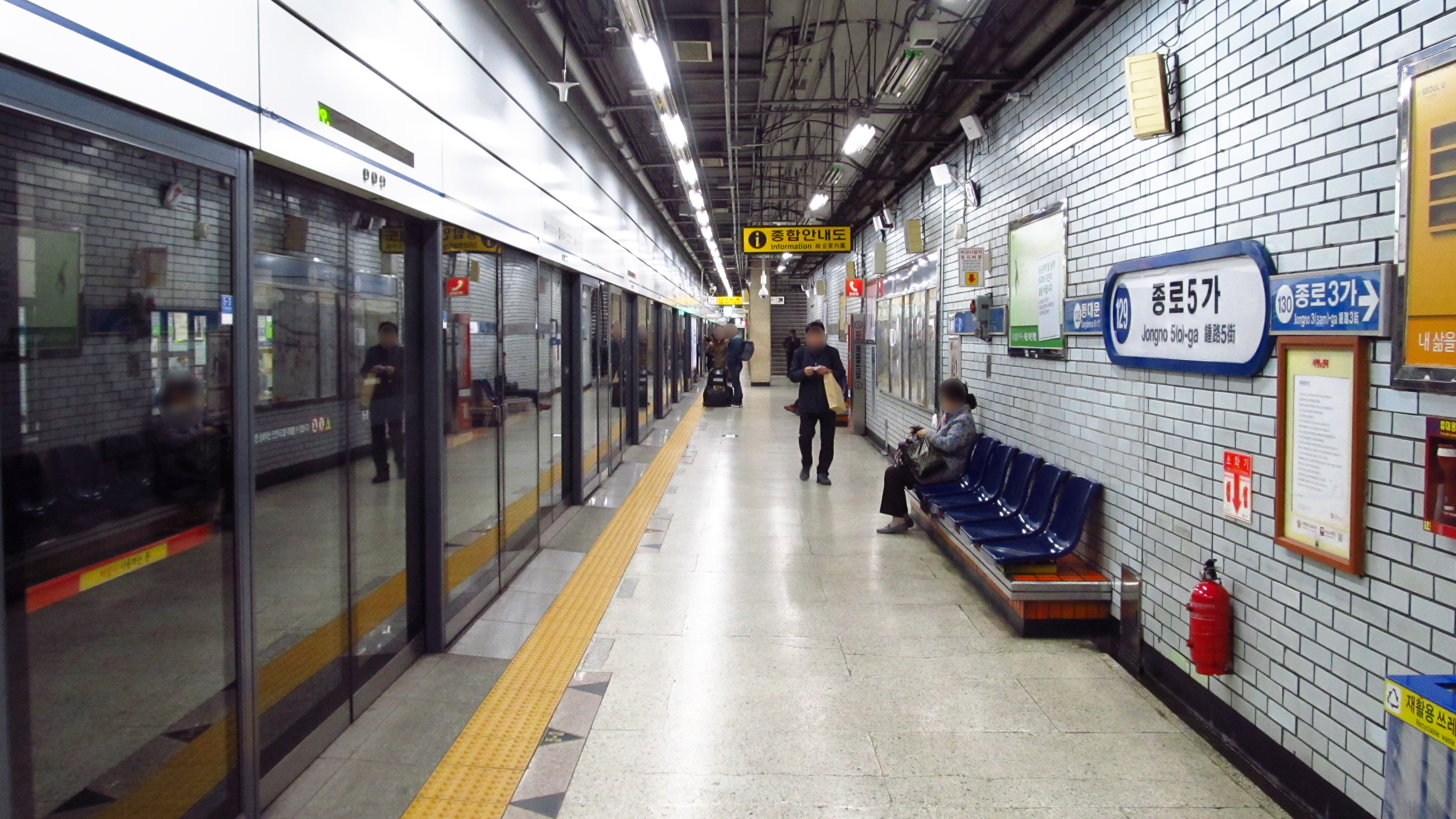
Jongno 5(o)-ga station, 2018

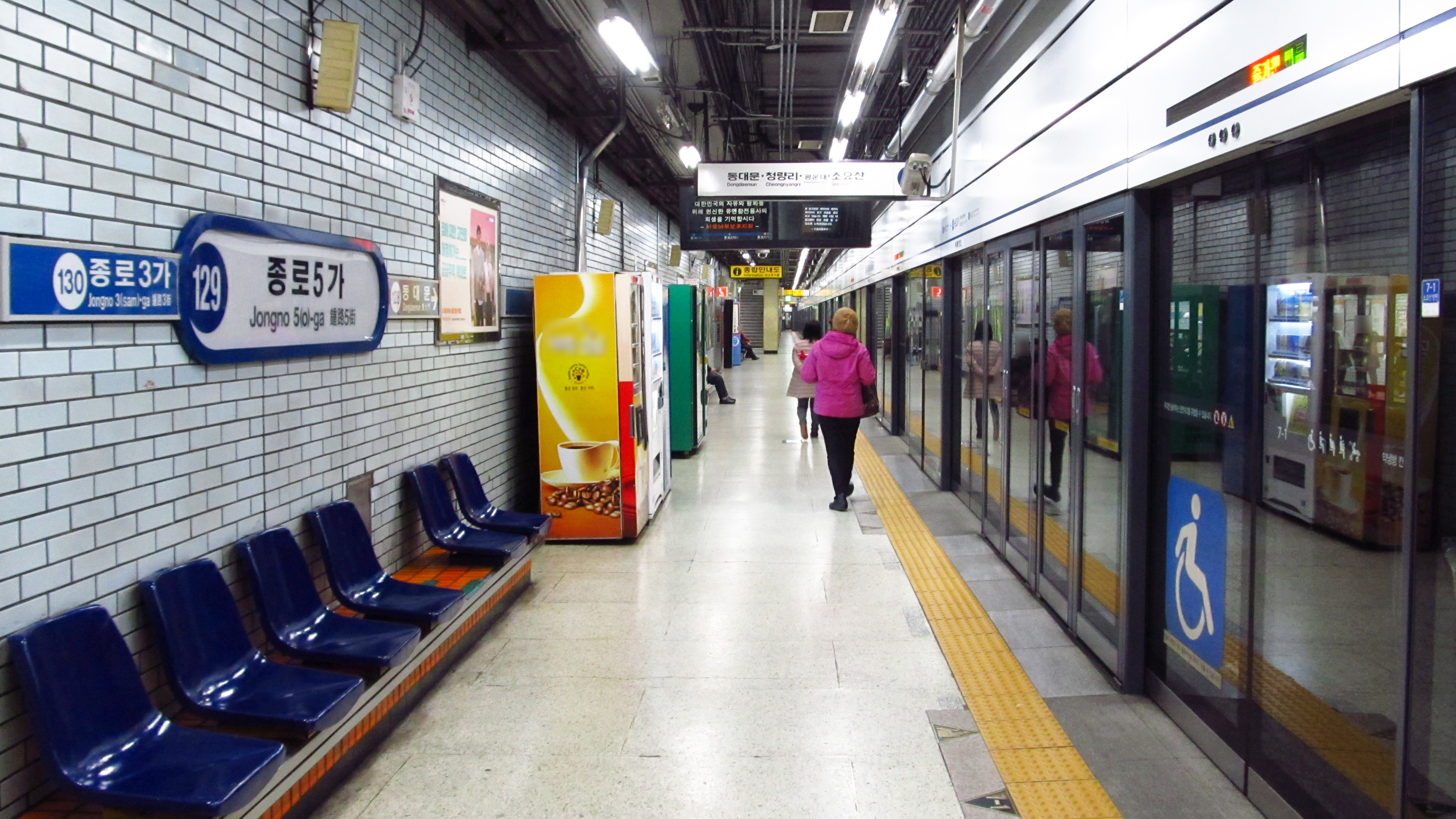
Jongno 5(o)-ga station, 2018

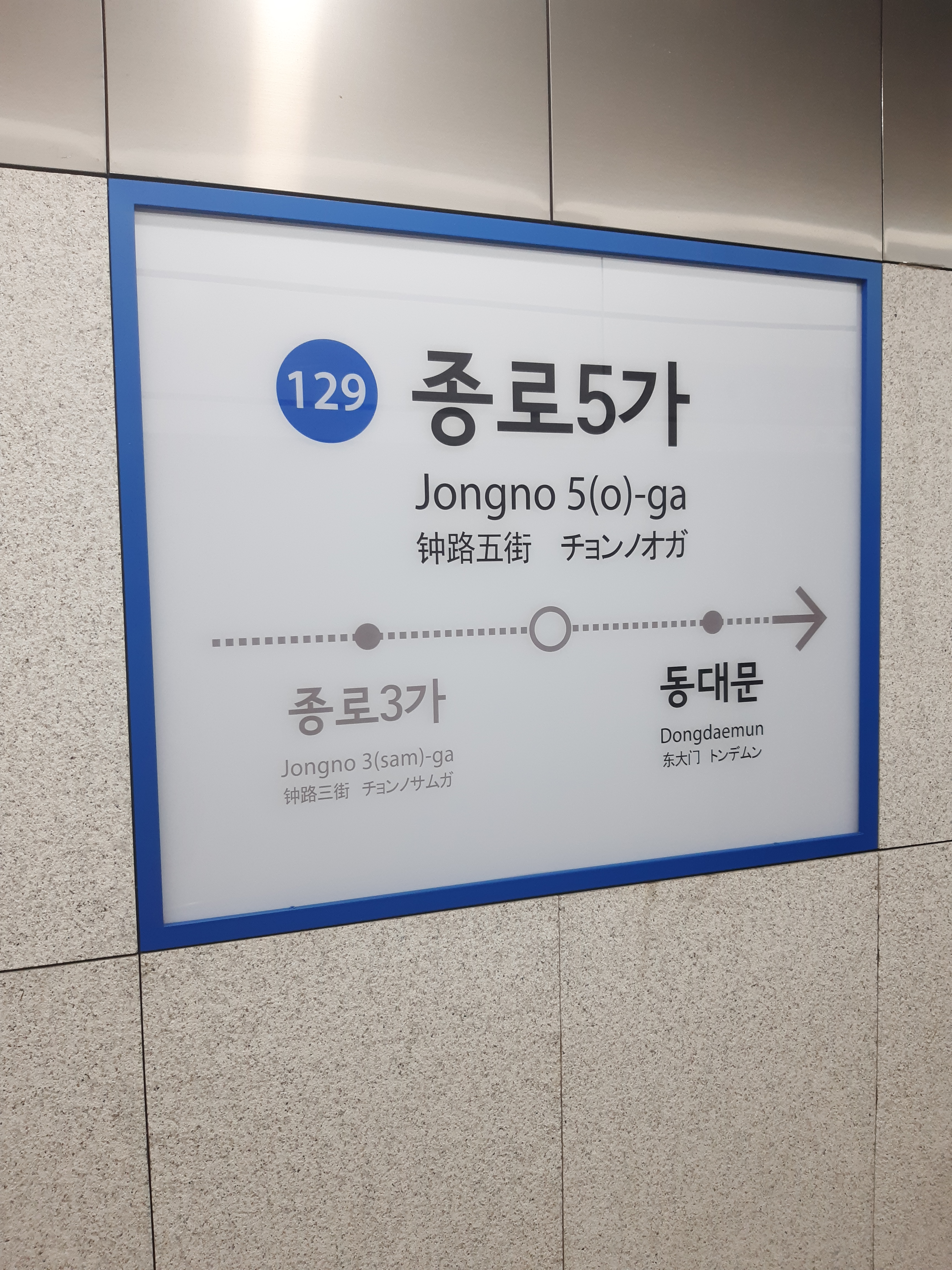
Jongno 5(o)-ga station 2021, after renovation
