= Seoul Metro Corporation =

Former Subway operator in Seoul, South Korea

- Company type: Municipal-owned corporation
- Industry: Rapid transit
- Founded: June 8, 1970 (reestablished September 1, 1981)
- Defunct: May 31, 2017
- Fate: Merged with Seoul Metropolitan Rapid Transit Corporation
- Successor: Seoul Transportation Corporation
- Headquarters: Seocho-gu, Seoul, South Korea
- Key people: Kim Tae-ho (President, 2016–2017)
- Products: Subway
- Operating income: 6,593,770,000,000 (KRWON)(2005)
- Net income: -81,718,477,562 (KRWON) (2005)
- Owner: Seoul Metropolitan Government
- Number of employees: 10,128(2006)
- Website: www.seoulmetro.co.kr

Seoul Metro Corporation (Korean: 서울메트로) was a municipal-owned corporation owned by the Seoul Metropolitan Government. Established in 1970, it was, with Seoul Metropolitan Rapid Transit Corporation and Korail, one of the major operators of Seoul Metropolitan Subway. The company merged with Seoul Metropolitan Rapid Transit Corporation in 2017.

== History ==
1. June 8, 1970: Subway construction headquarters
2. April 1971: Line 1 (Cheongnyangni Station - Seoul Station) construction started and opened
3. October 1974: Gunja Depot construction
4. March 9, 1978: Line 2 Gangnam Section construction started
5. February 29, 1980: Line 3 and 4 construction started
6. May 22, 1984: Line 2 Circle Line opened
7. October 18, 1985: Line 3 and 4 opened
8. July 13, 1990: Line 3 (Gupabal Station - Jichuk Station) opened
9. May 22, 1992: Line 2 Sinjeong Branch (Sindorim Station - Yangcheon-gu Office Station) opened
10. April 21, 1993: Line 4 (Sanggye Station - Danggogae Station) opened
11. October 10, 1993: Line 3 (Yangjae Station - Suseo Station) opened
12. April 1, 1994: Line 4 (Sadang Station - Namtaeryeong Station) opened
13. March 20, 1996, Line 2 Sinjeong Branch (Sinjeongnegeori Station - Kkachisan Station) opened
14. October 20, 2005: Line 2 Yongdu Station opened
15. December 21, 2005: Line 1 Dongmyo Station opened
16. February 18, 2010: Line 3 (Suseo Station - Ogeum Station) opened
17. March 28, 2015: Line 9 (Eonju Station - Sports Complex Station) opened
18. May 31, 2017: Merged with Seoul Metropolitan Rapid Transit Corporation & Seoul Metro

== Lines ==
Seoul Metro's service covers a part of Seoul Subway Line 1, and the whole Seoul Subway Line 2, Seoul Subway Line 3, Seoul Subway Line 4. For lines 1, 3, and 4, Korail jointly participates in the service. Seoul Metro controls the railways and stations which are owned by Seoul Metropolitan Government.

- Line 1
  - Control: Cheongnyangni station - Seoul Station
  - Service: Yangju station - Incheon station / Seodongtan station
  - Total Length: 7.8 km
- Line 2
  - Circle Line: City Hall station ↔ Seongsu station ↔ Gangnam station ↔ Sindorim station ↔ Hongik University station ↔ City Hall station
  - Seongsu Branch
  - Sinjeong Branch (Except for Kkachisan station controlled by Seoul Metropolitan Rapid Transit Corporation)
  - Total Length: 60.2 km
- Line 3
  - Control: Jichuk station - Ogeum station (Except for Garak Market station controlled by Seoul Metropolitan Rapid Transit Corporation)
  - Service: Daehwa station - Ogeum station
  - Total Length: 38.2 km
- Line 4
  - Control: Danggogae station - Namtaeryeong station
  - Service: Danggogae station - Oido station
  - Total Length: 31.7 km
- Line 5
  - Control: Ogeum station
- Line 6
  - Control: Yeonsinnae station
- Line 9
  - Control: Eonju station - Sports Complex station
  - Total Length: 4.3 km

== Depots ==
- Gunja Depot
- Sinjeong Depot
- Jichuk Depot
- Changdong Depot

== See also ==
- Korail
- Seoul Metropolitan Rapid Transit Corporation
- List of rapid transit systems
- List of urban rail systems by length
- Seoul Metropolitan Subway stations
- Transportation in South Korea
