= Jongno 3(sam)-ga station =

Metro station in South Korea

| 종로3가; Jongno 3(sam)-ga |
| 종로3가; Jongno 3(sam)-ga |
| 종로3가 (탑골공원); Jongno 3(sam)-ga (Tapgol Park) |
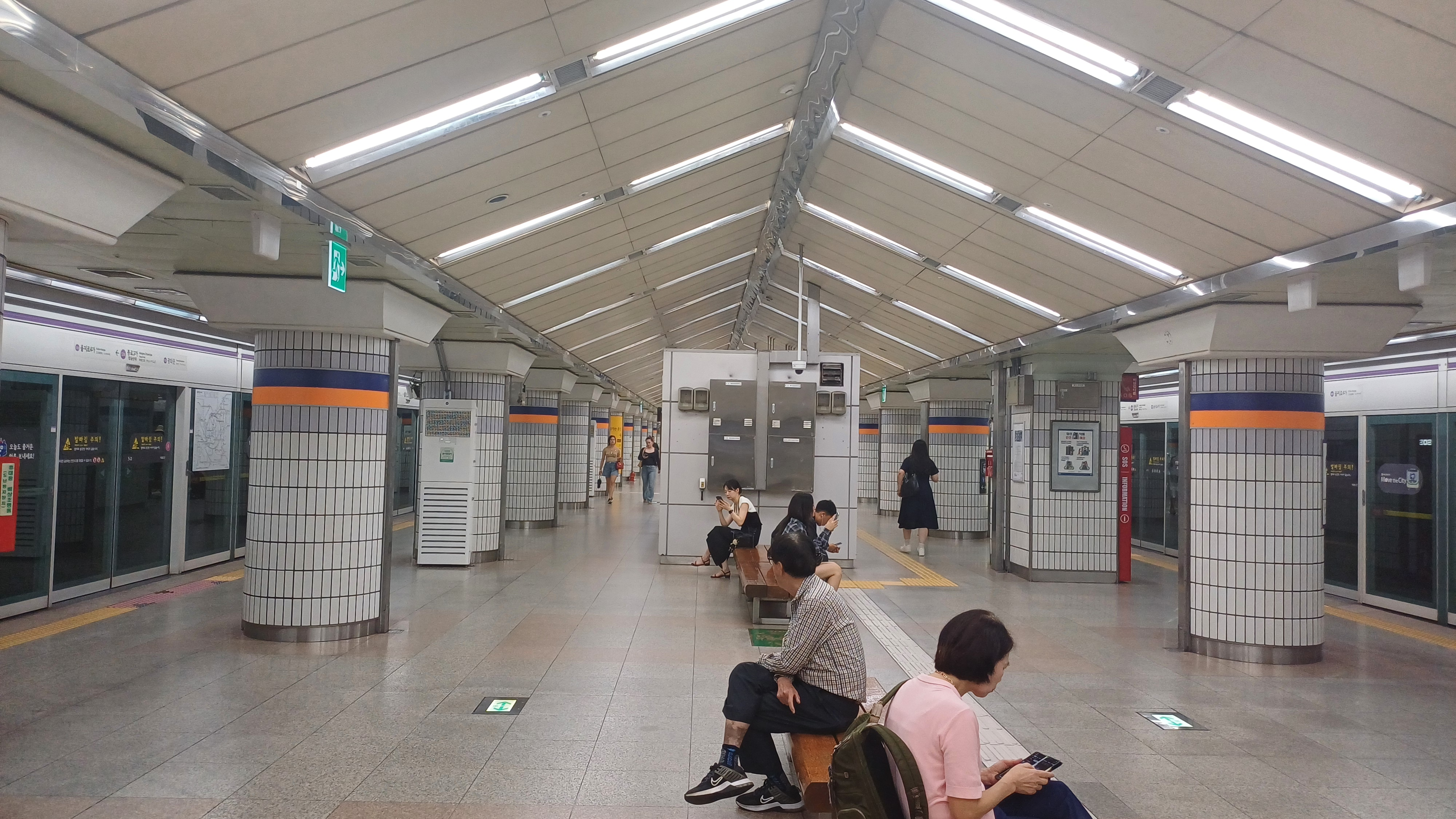
- Line 5 platforms

Korean name
- Hangul: 종로3가역
- Hanja: 鍾路3街驛
- Revised Romanization: Jongnosamga-yeok
- McCune–Reischauer: Chongnosamga-yŏk

General information
- Location: 61-68 Jongno 3-ga, 129 Jongno Jiha, Jongno-gu, Seoul
- Coordinates: 37°34′12″N 126°59′30″E
- Operator: Seoul Metro
- Lines: Line 1 Line 3 Line 5
- Platforms: 4
- Tracks: 6

Construction
- Structure type: Underground

Key dates
- August 15, 1974: Line 1 opened
- October 18, 1985: Line 3 opened
- December 30, 1996: Line 5 opened

Passengers
- (Daily) Based on Jan-Dec of 2012. Line 1: 72,780; Line 3: 19,055; Line 5: 26,250
Services
| Preceding station | Seoul Metropolitan Subway | Following station |
|---|---|---|
| Jongno 5(o)-ga towards Kwangwoon University or Yeoncheon | Line 1 | Jonggak towards Incheon, Seodongtan or Sinchang |
| Jongno 5(o)-ga towards Dongducheon | Line 1 Gyeongwon Express | Jonggak towards Incheon |
| Jongno 5(o)-ga towards Cheongnyangni | Line 1 Gyeongbu Express | Jonggak towards Sinchang |
| Anguk towards Daehwa | Line 3 | Euljiro 3(sam)-ga towards Ogeum |
| Gwanghwamun towards Banghwa | Line 5 | Euljiro 4(sa)-ga towards Hanam Geomdansan or Macheon |
Location

Jongno 3(sam)-ga Station (Korean: 종로3가역) is an underground station on lines 1, 3 and 5 of the Seoul Subway in South Korea.

In December 2010 the station is recorded as having the fifth highest WiFi data consumption of all the Seoul Metropolitan Subway stations, following Express Bus Terminal Station, Sadang Station, Dongdaemun Station and Jamsil Station.

== Station layout ==
| G | Street level | Exit |

| L1; Concourse | Lobby | Customer Service, Shops, Vending machines, ATMs |

| L2; Line 1 platforms | Side platform, doors will open on the left |
| L2; Line 1 platforms | Southbound | Line 1 toward Incheon, Seodongtan or Sinchang (Jonggak) → |
| L2; Line 1 platforms | Northbound | ← Line 1 toward Kwangwoon University or Yeoncheon (Jongno 5(o)-ga) |
| L2; Line 1 platforms | Side platform, doors will open on the left |

| L3; Line 3 platform | Northbound | ← Line 3 toward Daehwa (Anguk) |
| L3; Line 3 platform | Island platform, doors will open on the left |
| L3; Line 3 platform | Southbound | Line 3 toward Ogeum (Euljiro 3(sam)-ga) → |

| L4; Line 5 platform | Westbound | ← Line 5 toward Banghwa (Gwanghwamun) |
| L4; Line 5 platform | Island platform, doors will open on the left |
| L4; Line 5 platform | Eastbound | Line 5 toward Hanam Geomdansan or Macheon (Euljiro 4(sa)-ga) → |

== History ==
The station opened to Line 1 services on August 15, 1974. On October 18, 1985, services on Line 3 began stopping at Jongno 3(sam)-ga, and on December 30, 1996, Line 5 trains began calling here.

== Entrances ==
The following places are accessible from this station's exits as listed.

- Exit 1: Jongno 1, 2, 3, 4 Ga Dong Office, Jongno 2 Ga Post Office, Jongno 2 Ga Public Safety Centre, Tapgol Park; Insa Dong
- Exit 2; 2-1: Changdeokgung
- Exit 3: Donui Dong; Jongno 3 Ga Fire Station; Jongno 3 Ga Public Safety Centre; Jongmyo; Jongmyo Citizens' Park
- Exit 4: Nakwon Dong. Exit 6 is used from Line 1.
- Exit 5: Seoul Gyodong Primary School; Seoul Unhyeon Primary School; Jongnno 1, 2, 3, 4 Ga Dong Office; Jongno 2 Ha Post Office; Jongno 2 Ga Public Safety Centre; Jongno Tax Office; Tapgol Park. Exit 3 or 6 is used from Line 1.
- Exit 6: Jongno 3 Ga Fire Station
- Exit 7: Anguk Dong; Donhwamun; Jongno 3 Ga Public Safety Centre; Changdeokgung
- Exit 8: Myo Dong; Changdeokgung; Jongmyo Citizens' Park
- Exit 9: Jongmyo; Jongno 3 Ga Fire Station; Jongno 3 Ga Public Safety Centre
- Exit 10: Jongmyo; Jongmyo Citizens' Park
- Exit 11: Daerim Shopping
- Exit 12: Jongno 4 Ga
- Exit 13: Jangsa Dong; Cheonggyecheon 3 Ga
- Exit 14: Cheonggyecheon 3 Ga; Seoul Teenagers' Training Centre
- Exit 15: Gwansu Dong; Jongno 2 Ga; Industrial Bank of Korea, End of Jongno

== Tourism ==
In January 2013, the Seoul Metropolitan Rapid Transit Corporation, which operates this line, published free guidebooks in three languages: English, Japanese and Chinese (simplified and traditional), which features eight tours as well as recommendations for accommodations, restaurants and shopping centers. The tours are designed with different themes, e.g. Korean traditional culture, which goes from this station to Anguk Station and Gyeongbokgung Station on line No 3 that showcases antique shops and art galleries of Insa-dong.

== Gallery ==
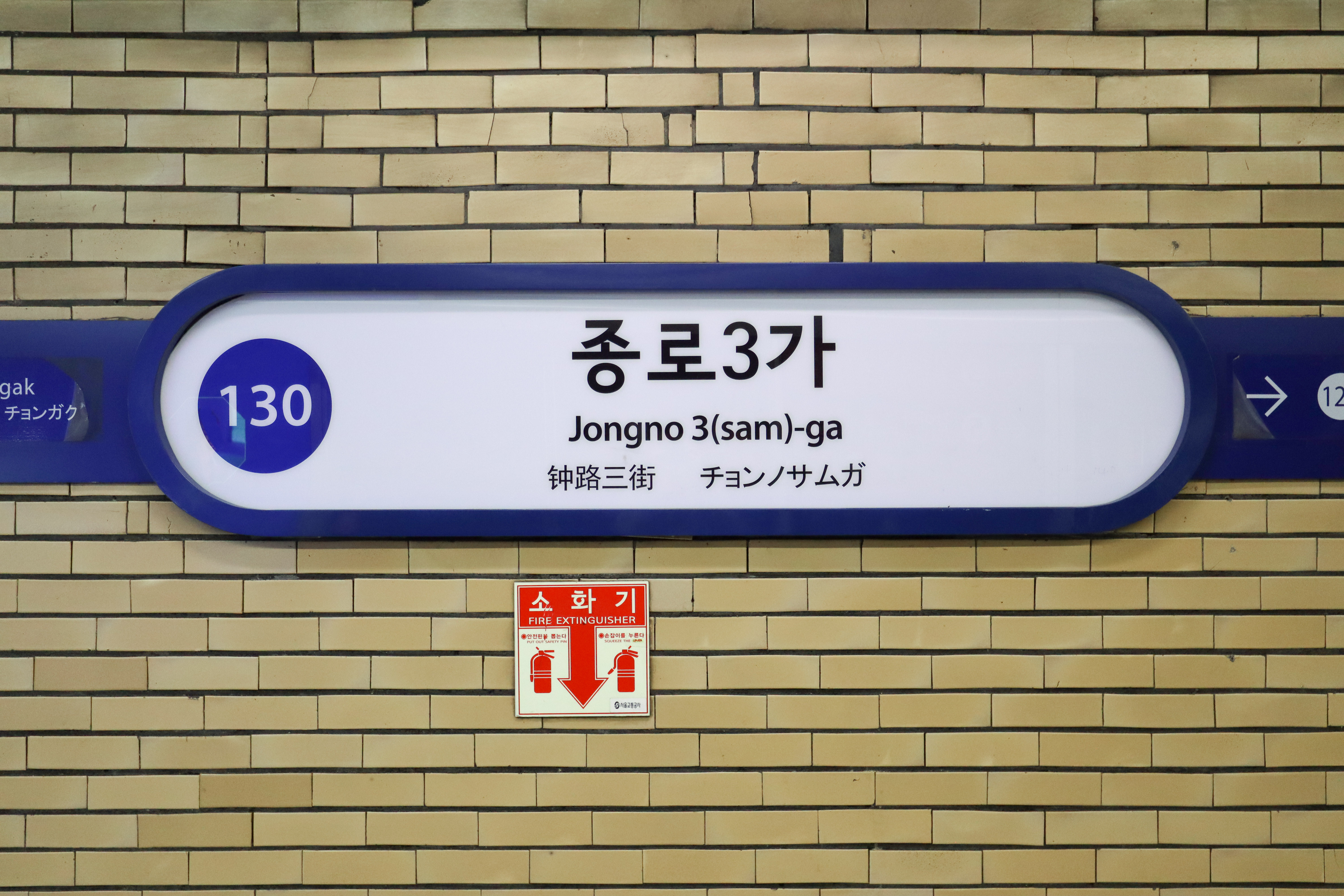
Line 1 station nameplate

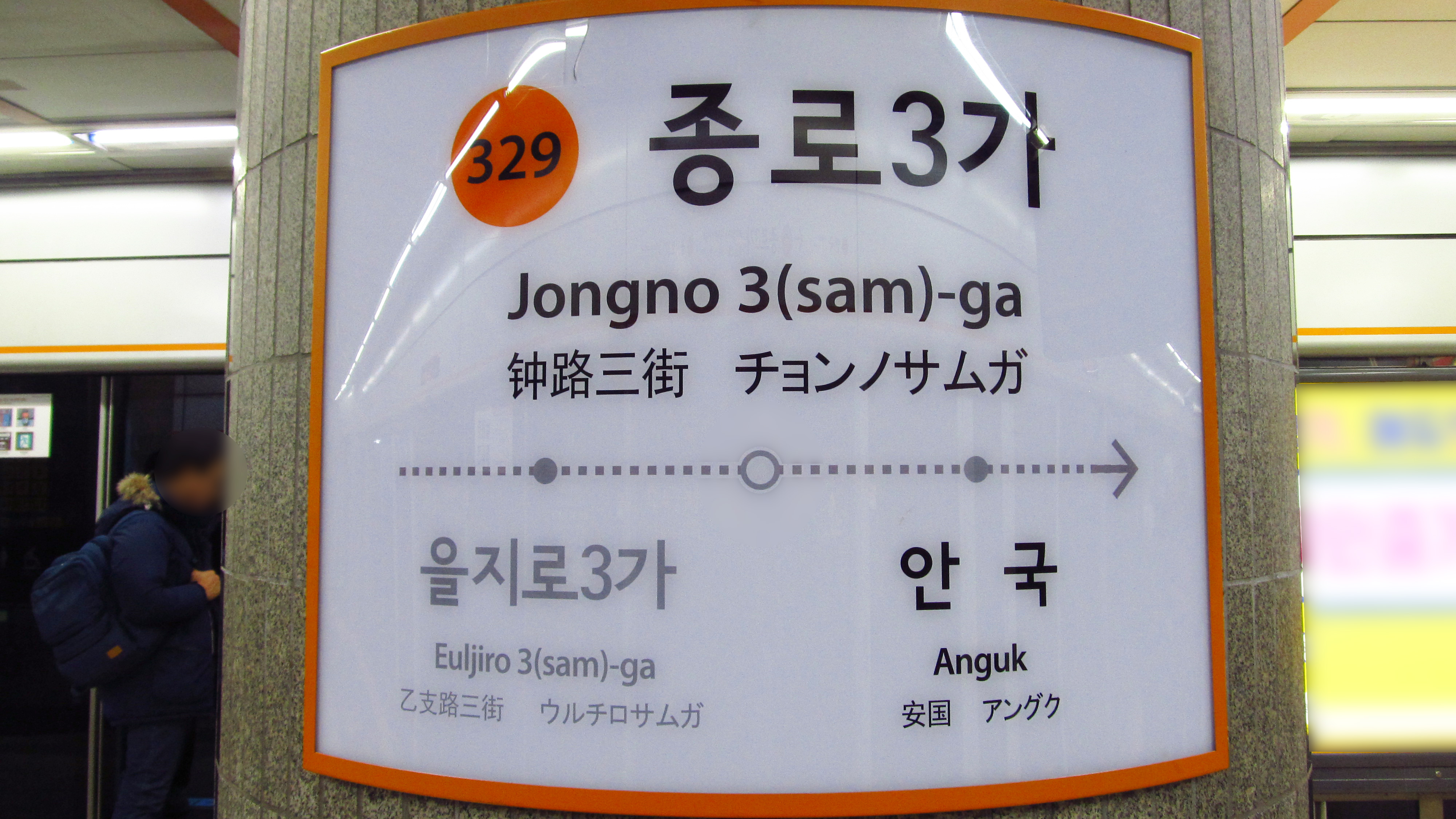
Line 3 station nameplate

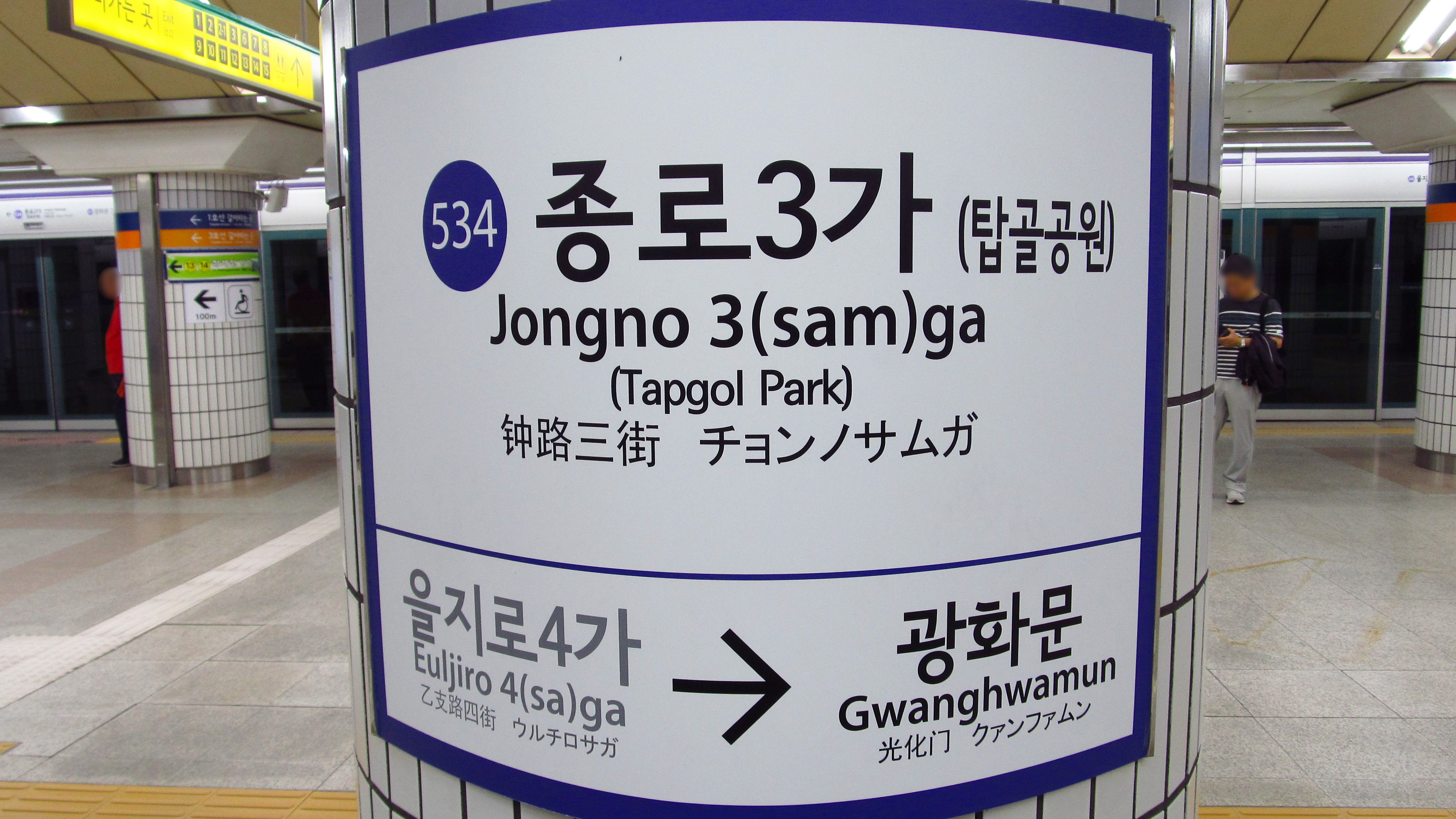
Line 5 station nameplate
