= Gwanhun-dong =

- Interactive map of Gwanhun-dong
- Country: South Korea

Area
  - Total: 0.07 km^{2} (0.027 sq mi)

Korean name
- Hangul: 관훈동
- Hanja: 寬勳洞
- RR: Gwanhun-dong
- MR: Kwanhun-dong

Gwanhun-dong (Korean: 관훈동) is a dong (neighborhood) of Jongno District, Seoul, South Korea. It is a legal dong (beopjeong-dong 法定洞) governed under its administrative dong (haengjeong-dong 行政洞), Jongno 1, 2, 3, 4 ga-dong.

The area is bordered by Anguk-dong and Songhyeon-dong to the north, Gyeongun-dong to the east, and Insadong to the south, and Gyeonji-dong to the west. During the early period of the Joseon period (1392–1897), the place belonged to Gwanin-bang (寬仁坊) - bang (坊) was an administrative unit during the time - of the Jungbu district (中部), Hansŏng (old name for the capital, Seoul).

== See also ==
- Insadong
- Administrative divisions of South Korea
