= Get together! Get angry! Resign Park Geun-hye candlelight vigil =

2016 protests in South Korea

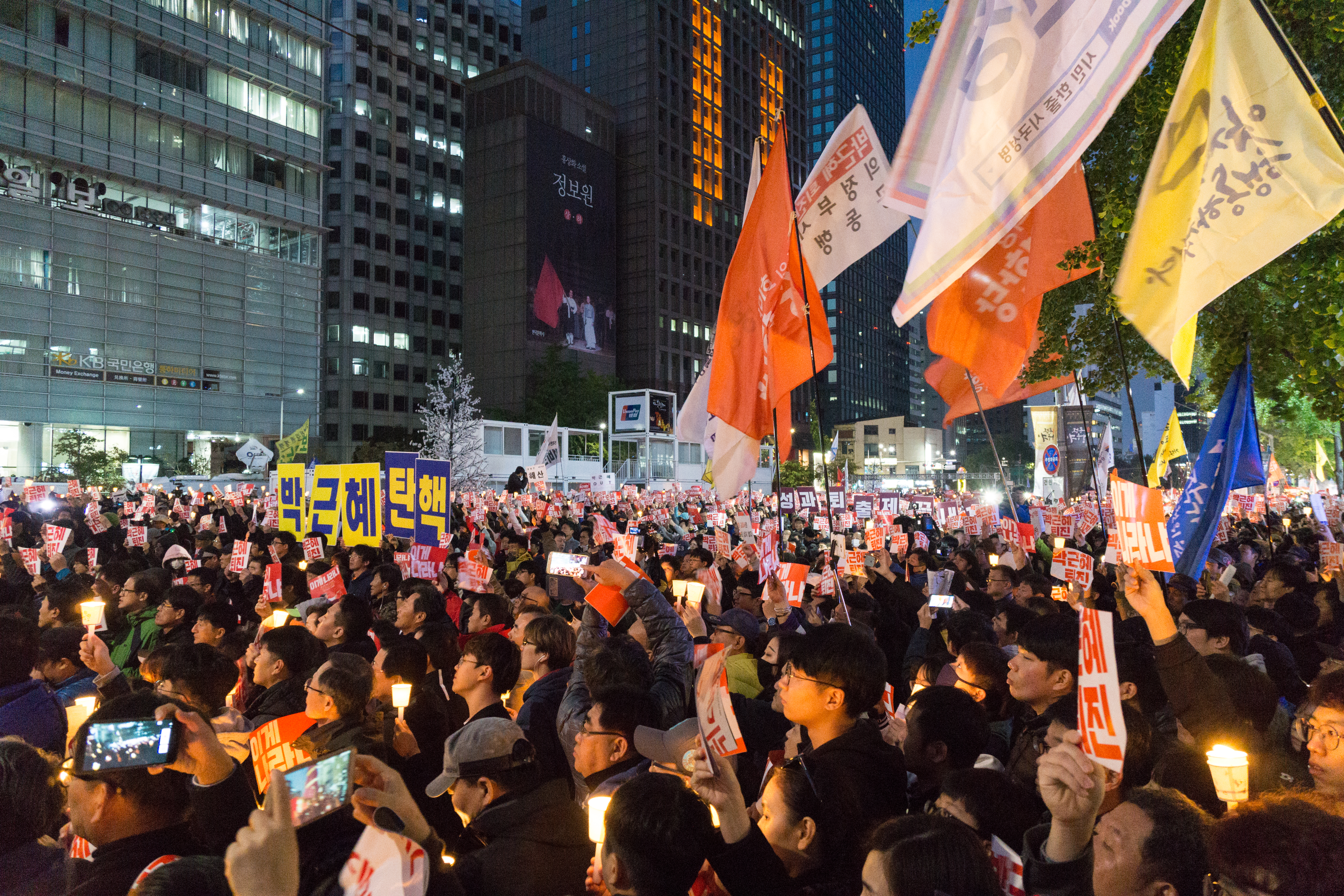
Protesters at Cheonggye Plaza, Seoul, on October 29, 2016

Get together! Get angry! #Resign_ParkGeun-hye candlelight vigil (Korean: 모이자! 분노하자! #내려와라_박근혜 시민 촛불) was the first candlelight vigil held on October 29, 2016, calling for the resignation of President Park Geun-hye. It marked the beginning of a series of 20 candlelight vigils. Organizers estimated that 30,000 people participated, while police estimates put the number at 12,000.

On October 24, 2016, JTBC reported that it had obtained a tablet PC believed to belong to Choi Soon-sil, which allegedly contained drafts of presidential speeches and other materials related to state affairs. The following day, President Park publicly admitted to having a private relationship with Choi, issuing an apology. The revelations triggered widespread public outrage, leading to university declarations and street rallies. On October 29, the first weekend after JTBC's report, a large candlelight vigil was held in downtown Seoul.

The rally began with a pre-candlelight rally at Cheonggye Plaza in Jongno District, where speakers from various backgrounds made critical remarks and declarations. The initial plan was to march from Cheonggye Plaza to Insa-dong. However, during the march at Jongno 1-ga, demonstrators broke through a police cordon and moved toward Gwanghwamun Plaza in an attempt to reach Cheong Wa Dae. Blocked by police barricades, protesters continued their confrontation with authorities. The official rally concluded at 10 p.m., with organizers announcing its end.

Unlike earlier demonstrations, such as the Minjungchonggwolgi, this protest was largely peaceful. Citizens urged fellow demonstrators to avoid violent clashes, and police adopted a restrained approach, using polite announcements and refraining from deploying crowd-control equipment such as sprinkler truck. The following day, the Seoul Metropolitan Police Agency issued a press release thanking citizens for their cooperation. Organizers, meanwhile, announced that daily candlelight vigils would continue at Cheonggye Plaza, along with another protest the following week and a large-scale rally on November 12.

== Background ==
The suspicion of Choi Soon-sil's involvement in establishing the Mi-r Foundation was first raised by TV Chosun in August 2016. On September 20, 2016, The Hankyoreh reported that Choi Soon-sil had participated in establishing both the Mir Foundation and the K-SPORTS Foundation, prompting media scrutiny of her activities. Between late September and early October, a series of social scandals—including the 2016 Ewha Womans University scandal, the death of farmer Baek Nam-ki, and a request for an autopsy warrant—continued to attract attention, while opposition parties criticized the government during regular parliamentary audits.

From mid-October, the "Park Geun-hye–Choi Soon-sil gate" emerged as a major topic in the media. Reports by JTBC, TV Chosun, and The Hankyoreh highlighted alleged corruption related to the foundations, Chung Yoo-ra's admission scandal, and the Park Geun-hye administration blacklist of cultural groups. Despite these reports, the Park Geun-hye administration consistently denied the allegations, including those concerning the foundations and the alleged revision of presidential speeches.

On October 24, 2016, JTBC Newsroom reported obtaining a tablet PC containing circumstantial evidence that Choi Soon-sil had received 44 presidential speeches, including documents considered state secrets, in advance. Although the initial report only included a small portion of the material on the tablet, it was sufficient to shock Korean society, as it confirmed that a civilian had access to presidential documents.

The following day, at 4 p.m. on October 25, President Park Geun-hye publicly admitted at the Cheongwadae's Chunchugwan that "Choi Soon-sil helped in times of trouble in the past" and that "some speeches and others were helped by Choi Soon-sil." However, her framing of the situation as a personal connection failed to acknowledge her responsibility as the head of state, fueling further public suspicion regarding the Park Geun-hye–Choi Soon-sil scandal. Shortly after the apology, around 4:35 p.m., keywords such as "impeachment," "Park Geun-hye impeachment," and "resignation" became top search terms on Naver and Daum. Public opinion deteriorated rapidly, with a Realmeter survey showing President Park's approval rating dropping from 22.7 percent on October 25 to 17.5 percent on October 26.

== Development ==
=== Preparation ===
The Minjungchonggwolgi struggle headquarters, which organized the first candlelight vigil, was initially preparing for protests scheduled for November 12. Until 26 days prior, the official Facebook account of the headquarters had not planned a separate large-scale rally apart from the public rally. However, as the Park Geun-hye–Choi Soon-sil scandal intensified, it was announced that the "Citizens' Candlelight Contest" would be held at Cheonggye Plaza at 7 p.m. on October 29, marking the first vigil since a smaller rally on May 26. Observers have interpreted this as the struggle headquarters adapting its role to host the first three candlelight vigils while preparing for the November Minjungchonggwolgi rally. The official name of the rally was 모이자! 분노하자! 내려와라 박근혜 (Get Together! Get Angry! Resign Park Geun-hye), and the slogan was used through the November 12, 2016 South Korean protests.

=== Progression ===
==== Protests in the provinces ====
On October 29, at 4:00 p.m., bus drivers in Jeonju, Jeonbuk, belonging to the Jeonbuk Bus Workers' Union, held a honking protest in support of President Park’s resignation. Approximately 300 buses participated for about three minutes, displaying pickets to inform local citizens. The honking protest echoed similar actions during the 1987 June Struggle, a key pro-democracy movement in South Korea.

In the Yeongnam region, the Ulsan Organizing Committee of Minjungchonggwolgi, formed by the Ulsan branch of the Korean Confederation of Trade Unions and affiliated labor unions, organized a rally at the plaza of Taehwagang Station in Nam-gu, Ulsan. Around 1,000 participants, with approximately 800 police officers present, held a rally for about an hour before marching through the Ulsan branch of Hyundai Department Store.

==== Protests in Seoul ====
In Seoul, roughly 20 members of the youth organization "21st Century Youth Community Hope" held a "Youth Declaration 1st Action" at BukInsa Madang in Anguk-dong, Jongno District, at 2 p.m. They issued a declaration signed by 149 high school students and performed a reenactment of President Park's public apology.

University declarations also continued on the day of the rally. Student councils from ten major universities, including Korea University, Dongkuk University, Sogang University, Seoul National University, Yonsei University, Ewha Womans University, Chung-Ang University, KAIST, Hanyang University, and Hongik University, held a press conference at Hanyang University calling for Park Geun-hye's resignation and a thorough investigation into the Choi Soon-sil scandal.

==== Candlelight vigil ====
At 6 p.m., a candlelight vigil hosted by the struggle headquarters began at Cheonggye Plaza in Jongno District, with thousands of citizens gathering. Participants included individuals, families, friends, and senior citizens who supported the president.

The vigil largely consisted of public condemnation from various sectors. In his opening address, Jeong Hyeon-chan, president of the Catholic Farmers Association, stated: "Whenever the country was in trouble, we defeated the dictator not by politicians, but by the power of all the people gathered here. President Park Geun-hye should no longer drive the people into a crucible of pain and step down immediately." A college student who had previously been detained for shouting demands for the president's resignation also addressed the crowd, stating: "Despite a series of declarations of the state of affairs, the president does not seem to know what went wrong. We must impeach the president."

==== Protest march ====
The struggle headquarters had announced that after the pre-candlelight rally, participants would march from Cheonggye Plaza through Jongno 2-ga and Insadong-BukInsa Madang. Police deployed 4,800 officers from 60 companies to manage the event.

At 7:10 p.m., following the vigil, an estimated 4,000 citizens began marching, chanting slogans calling for the president to step down while police managed two lanes of the road. Upon reaching Jonggak, some protesters deviated from the planned route and attempted to proceed toward Jogyesa. Police intervened in Gongpyeong-dong near Jonggak Station, leading to confrontations. Some protesters then moved toward Gwanghwamun, chanting "Let's go to Blue House," and breached the first police line, entering the Jongno lane. The second police cordon in front of the Kyobo Book Centre was also breached, and demonstrators reached Gwanghwamun Plaza around 7:55 p.m. A third cordon near King Sejong's statue contained the crowd, though confrontations continued. Police additionally set up bus barricades at key intersections to prevent individual access to the Blue House.

== Reaction and aftermath ==
=== Reactions from all walks of life ===
On October 30, the day after the rally, the Seoul Metropolitan Police Agency issued a press release stating: "The number of participants, including ordinary citizens, increased as they moved outside the notified course and to Gwanghwamun Square during the march. There were physical confrontations between some protesters and police, but the police responded patiently to ensure citizens' safety." Referring to the broadcast by Hong Wan-sun, the police chief of Jongno District, the agency added, "We thank the citizens for following police instructions and cooperating rationally."

Meanwhile, the Blue House appeared to closely monitor public opinion. A luncheon for civilian members of the Unification Preparation Committee, scheduled for the eve of the rally, was postponed, and the administration closely observed the rally as a prosecution seizure and search was underway. The following day, the Blue House announced a personnel reform plan and accepted the resignations of key figures, including Woo Byung-woo and Ahn Jong-beom, and secretaries Jeong Ho-seong, Ahn Bong-geun, and Lee Jae-man, known collectively as the "doorknob trio." Analysts suggested that the accelerated reorganization aimed to respond swiftly to rapidly deteriorating public sentiment calling for "resignation" and "impeachment."

=== Analysis ===
Press coverage highlighted that the rally was largely citizen-led rather than orchestrated by political groups, and that it proceeded peacefully in contrast to previous protests involving steel pipes and water cannons. Kyunghyang Shinmun cited a participant's remark, "I'm so stressed and angry that my heart is about to burst," as the title of an article, while JTBC reported participants stating, "I came out because I couldn't believe it when I saw the news report."

Hankook Ilbo described the rally as a "voluntary citizens' rally across all generations," noting that some conservatives in their 50s and 60s, traditionally supportive of President Park, participated voluntarily. Similarly, Dong-A Ilbo reported that conservative citizens without prior experience in rallies or demonstrations "participated for the first time in their lives."

=== Media editorials and foreign media coverage ===
On October 31, newspapers published editorials criticizing President Park's decisions, citing the weekend rallies. JoongAng Ilbo characterized the rally as "rather intimidating because it was rational," noting that "although the protest was not violent, the form and content conveyed the anger and despondency of ordinary citizens."

Foreign media also reported on the first candlelight vigil. The Associated Press stated, "Citizens holding candles participated in the rally with hand signs reading 'Who is the real president' and 'Step down Park Geun-hye.' It is the largest anti-government rally in Seoul in recent months, and President Park's lame duck could accelerate."
