= Baedari Secondhand Bookstore Alley =

Place in Incheon, South Korea

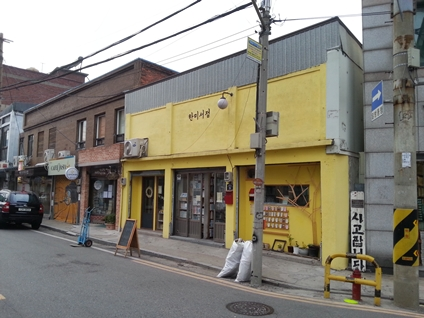
Baedari Secondhand Bookstore Alley

Baedari Secondhand Bookstore Alley (Korean: 인천배다리헌책방거리) is a historical and cultural space in Dong-gu, Incheon, South Korea. The Baedari Alley was once home to about 50 bookstores specializing in secondhand books, but only a handful remain today. The name Baedari comes from the name of the village Baedari meaning where boats and ships dock, and it currently covers the Geumchang-dong and Songhyeon-dong of Dong-gu, Incheon. This place was a gateway to import culture from Jemulpo port (the old name of Incheon) since it was open to foreign trade. After liberation, those who lost their homes around the port came to Baedari for food, to find a job, and to live. It is an area where various modern experiments were made as the modern culture brought in from the West and the traditional culture of the Joseon Dynasty formed a cultural interface. The film school, the cradle of modern education for Koreans, the Incheon Public Ordinary School, and the private school Uiseong Sasuk nurtured Korean talent in Baedari. It is an area with significance in the history of modern Christianity in Korea. Presently, Baedari is full of old bookstores, stationery stores, photo studios, restaurants, murals, craft shops, photo galleries, Baedari Space Beam.

Baedari alley used to be on the outskirts of the city's development. There used to be a bridge over the sea for ships, but now there is a bridge leading to a neighboring village under the Incheon line railroad. Even with the development plans in Incheon, this alley doesn't host high-rise buildings but rather densely populated single-family houses. Around ten stores carry on the history of Baedari Secondhand Bookstore Alley. These stores are running for over 40 years since the early 1960s. Most of the books are being sold at half the price of their regular price. These bookstores handle all kinds of books from ancient Korean literature materials to art, music, oriental medicine, professional books, technical books, children's collections, language books, textbooks, reference books, and dictionaries. One feature to stand out in these secondhand bookstores is that books are arranged in stacks, piled without classification.

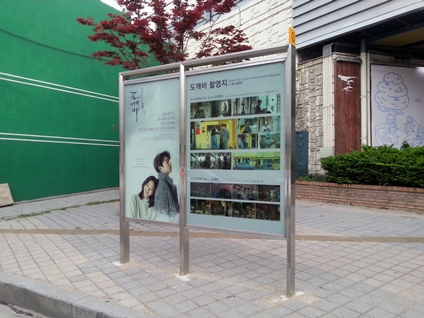
Filming location of the drama Goblin in Baedari Secondhand Bookstore Alley

At the entrance of the alley, there is Baedari Mural Street, which depicts the old faces and lives of the people of Baedari on the walls of the old alley. These murals were painted one by one on the walls of the alleys in Daldongne Village and Baedari Secondhand Bookstore Street in the 60s and 70s to preserve the aesthetics of Baedari. Wall paintings depicting forebears' harsh life story and their daily ordeals are found in the area around Changyoung Elementary school which is about 100 years old. The Baedari Village has transformed from a space to buy and sell old books into a new cultural space for the villagers. Moreover, the locality became a tourist attraction and sort out place for K-drama lovers after some scenes of the popular shows were shot there.

== History ==
Baedari Secondhand Bookstore Alley (인천배다리헌책방거리), located in the boundary between Geumgok-dong and Changyeong-dong in Dong-gu, Incheon, was Incheon's representative road to Seoul, before the establishment of Gyeongin Railroad, and was referred to as Ugakli Street. This historical alley was formed after the Korean War (1953) by the merchants as they loaded their books on a handcart to sell in this ruined street. During the peak times in the 1960s, about forty bookstores were in this alley. In 60s and 70s when living was difficult and every necessity was in crisis due to the aftermath of the war, it was the sole secondhand bookstore alley in the Incheon area which could cater to the people's quest for knowledge. By 1974, many secondhand bookstores came into existence and for the next 30 years, it was at its peak. From the 1960s, students came to this place to buy used books in installments for one to two years till the end of their academic term. Baedari secondhand bookstores started declining around 1995, as the country prospered the tendency to prefer new books rather than used ones. In 1997, before IMF, Dowon Station was built and the surrounding schools were moved to other places which lead to the fall of footfalls. After IMF, students visited less due to which the bookstores started selling more general books than textbooks and reference books. The high-growth policy centered on industrialization and the spread of urban development also led to a decline in the cultural center of Baedari. Moreover, secondhand bookstores were not doing well because of online bookstores, big bookstores, and also online secondhand bookstore chains.

== Important sites of the Baedari Secondhand Bookstore Alley ==
=== Baedari Space Beam ===
Space Beam is an alternative art space based in an old rice wine brewery building on Baedari Road in East Incheon, that has been actively providing a forum for discussions and conducting various art practices concerning the social role of art in the local community. It plays a role in exchanging cultural space in the village in connection with the bookstores in the secondhand bookstore alley. It is used as a personal workspace for artists and also as an exhibition space.

=== First Generation Secondhand Bookstores ===
Only a few secondhand bookstores are remaining in the Baedari Secondhand Bookstore Alley like Abel Bookstore, Hanmi Bookstore, Jiphyeonjeon, Daechang Seorim, Samsung Seorim, Nabi Nalda. Nabi Nalda is a book cafe and a used bookstore founded in 2009. Currently, there are eight bookstores in Baedari.

==== 1. Jiphyeonjeon (집현전; Hanja: 集賢殿) ====
The first store to open on this street is "Jiphyeonjeon", named after a royal research institute set up by Sejong the Great of the Korean Joseon Dynasty. The bookstore was opened in 1951, during the Korean War, and has a 65-year history. In Incheon, it is the second bookstore to open. Jiphyeonjeon was bought by Bong-in Han in 1992 who was operating it until 2018. After his death, the store was handed over to Lee Sang-bong, former director of Baedari photo space. He decorated the whole space thereafter and reopened it in May 2021. It consists of three floors; the 2nd floor is the book shelter and the 3rd floor is the space for exhibition & lectures.

==== 2. Abel Bookstore (아벨서점) ====
Abel Book store is one of the oldest centers of Baedari Secondhand Bookstore Alley. It was opened in 1974 by now 72-year-old Hyeon-suk Kwak, who has been running Abel Bookstore in Dong-gu for 46 years and has been guarding Baedari Alley to this day. 'Abel' in Abel Bookstore is God's first disciple, meaning purity. On November 4, 1973, Kwak opened a small bookstore with a size of 3 to 4 pyeong in Dong-gu, Incheon. Since then, Abel Bookstore has moved its site four times, and in December 1995, it settled in its current location, Baedari, Dong-gu. It has many different kinds of old books, making it the leader of the street. It also runs Abel Gallery, on its second floor the gallery which is named 'Poem Attic' regular book exhibitions and poetry reading or meeting with the poet is held on every last Saturday. Kwak has been holding a 'poetry recital' in the annex of Abel Bookstore since 2007. 'You are all poets' is the theme of the poetry recital and renowned poets are also invited to these recitals. Currently, the poetry recital has been temporarily suspended due to COVID-19.

==== 3. Hanmi Bookstore (한미서점) ====
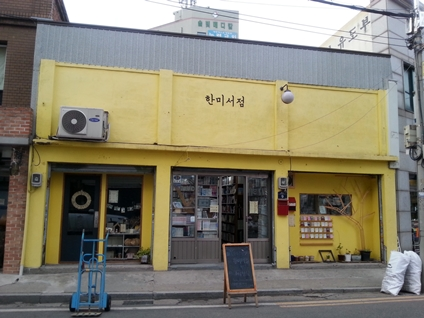
Hanmi Bookstore

The bookstore was opened by Jang Gyeong-hwan, now 80 years old in 1956. He has been selling second-hand books in Hwapyeong-dong since 1952. As a refugee in Hwanghee Province, he started selling two boxes of old monthly magazines and books. He and his brother had done the business together at the age of 17 and 18 at a street stall at Incheon Station. He procured books from Dongdaemun second-hand bookstore street in Seoul. A year later, he moved to Geumgok-dong, now Baedari, and opened the Hanmi Bookstore. The name of the bookstore meant that it's a bookstore where many Korean and American magazines, books, dictionaries, etc., brought from Bupyeong U.S. military base are sold. Hanmi belongs to the first generation of secondhand book stores in Baedari. The bookstore has been running through generations for 60 years and is now taken care of by his son. The bookstore scene from the popular K-drama Guardian: The Lonely and Great God was shot here and thus the store drew a lot of attention upon the drama's release.

==== 4. Daechang Seorim (대창 서림) ====
Daechang Bookstore was started in 1969 and is still running. Apart from selling secondhand books, it organizes many events such as publication commemorative events and interactions with authors. By 2022, the bookstore was scheduled to be promoted as a part of the cultural oasis project.

=== New generation of Secondhand Bookstores ===
Stores like 'Nabi Nalda (Butterfly Flies)' and 'Connect the Dots', located on Baedari Secondhand Bookstore Alley are from the new generation of secondhand bookstores. The key feature which distinguishes these from older generation secondhand bookstores is the less crowded and more displayed books with a cafe-like interior mainly offering illustrated books.

==== 1. Nabi Nalda (나비 날다) ====
The bookstore usually sells books centered on civic movements and the environment. 'Nabi' which is Korean for butterfly, is also an acronym here for 'divide and empty'. It has operated for over ten years and is famous as an unmanned bookstore on the SNS. It is owned by Cheongsan Byeolgaok who decided to open a bookstore after witnessing the closedown of many secondhand bookstores in 2009. Initially, he rented a small shop in a shopping mall nearby for 1,000 books with an open space to read and drink tea. In 2012, he moved to the current location and has been operating the bookstore with various cultural projects. Mostly secondhand books are sold and go by the policy of not returning any book upon not being sold, unlike large bookstores. Nabi Nalda is the base for holding various lectures and events through books.

==== 2. Connect the Dots ====
The bookstore Connect the Dots which was a distilling plant, sells only used books and independent publications. It was opened to provide a place of rest for people visiting the secondhand bookstore alley, rather than for profit.

== Feature in drama/movie ==
The popular Korean TV show called Goblin was filmed at Baedari Secondhand Bookstore alley. The scene between the protagonists played by actor Gong Yoo and actress Kim Ga-eun was shot at the Hanmi Bookstore. The series was successful both domestically and internationally, thus as a result the iconic yellow bookstore became a tourist attraction in Baedari. The TV show WWW also featured Hanmi Bookstore.

In episode 2 of the drama Let Me Be Your Knight/I'll Be Your Night (너의 밤이 되어줄게), Abel Bookstore appeared as 'Sosimdang'. The Abel Bookstore is also the subject of the 2020 documentary film Space Baedari (숨은지혜찾기) by Lim Ki-woong which describes opposition by locals to road construction through Baedari Village. Jiphyeonjeon was one of the filming sites for the movie Extreme jobs (극한직업) in 2019. It was set as the entrance to the gangsters' hideout in the movie and was filmed for several months. Daechang Bookstore appeared in the music video of the song "For Lovers Who Hesitate."

== Industrial road and redevelopment project dispute ==
In 2006, the middle section of about 50m by 300m of Baedari was demolished and cleared to prepare for building a 50m wide expressway. According to the Abel bookstore's CEO Kwak Hyeon-sook, the culture and history of Baedari as well as the Secondhand Bookstore Alley might disappear due to the new industrial road and redevelopment project. As the construction of the road through Baedari became visible, Kwak held a one-man protest daily in front of City Hall from 2007 to 2010 to protect Baedari. Since then, artists and activists joined the alliance to fight against destructive development and defended Baedari by silent protest at cultural events. Baedari was divided by the demolition for the industrial expressway construction on one side and a tent set up by the artists of Space Beam on the other side. After 2010, the Incheon government declared the expressway would be built underground and the demolished land was turned into a flower garden. Also, upon demand from the local community, a part of the demolished site was converted into a community park which was used as a vegetable garden, playground, and for eco-friendly activities with Space Beam in the middle. After the announcement of the Creative Port City project in 2016, the district office prohibited the park, dismantled the playground, and built flower ground with fences which resulted in public protest. After a long fight for people's right to commonplace, only half of the space could be secured for the community's purpose. A 2020 documentary film Space Baedari(숨은지혜찾기) directed by Lim Ki-woong was made on this issue. Despite local protests, work on the road continued in 2019, which created new friction between residents and the city government.
