= Savina Museum =

Coordinates: 37.5765°N 126.9847°E

- Established: March 6, 1996
- Location: 159 Anguk-dong, Jongno-gu, Seoul, South Korea
- Type: art museum
- Collection size: 550 m^{2} (5,900 sq ft)
- Director: Lee Myeong-ok (이명옥)
- Website: savinamuseum.com

Korean name
- Hangul: 사비나미술관
- Hanja: 사비나美術館
- Revised Romanization: Sabina misulgwan
- McCune–Reischauer: Sabina misulkwan

The Savina Museum is a private contemporary art museum of South Korea, located in Anguk-dong, Jongno District, Seoul.

== History ==
Savina Museum of Contemporary Art was established as Gallery Savina in 1996. In July 2002, Gallery Savina was renamed as Savina Museum of Contemporary Art.

The museum used to serve as an education center either. There are various educational programs implemented within the exhibition:

- The Fun Encounter with Art, Math, and Science – Let's Play, Logic!
- Discovering the Secret of Creativity Through Picasso and Magritte
- Career Searching for Youth Group

The main purpose of this museum is being a role model to other private museums as an education center for citizens of Seoul.

== Exhibitions ==
Name	Year
Interpretation of Humans	1996
Animals in Art	1996
Night Scenes	1996
Textbook Art	1997
Kiss	1998
Landscape of Water	1998
Weather Forecast	2000
Looking Seasonal Customs Through Paintings	2000
Communication Between Art and Math 1	2005
2050 Future Scope: Future Lab of Artists and Scientists	2009
Social Network Art: Changes in Art and Communication	2012
Artist's Portfolio	2013
3D Printing & Art	2014

== See also ==
- List of museums in South Korea
