= Insa-dong =

Neighborhood in Seoul, South Korea

Coordinates: 37.572972°N 126.986180°E

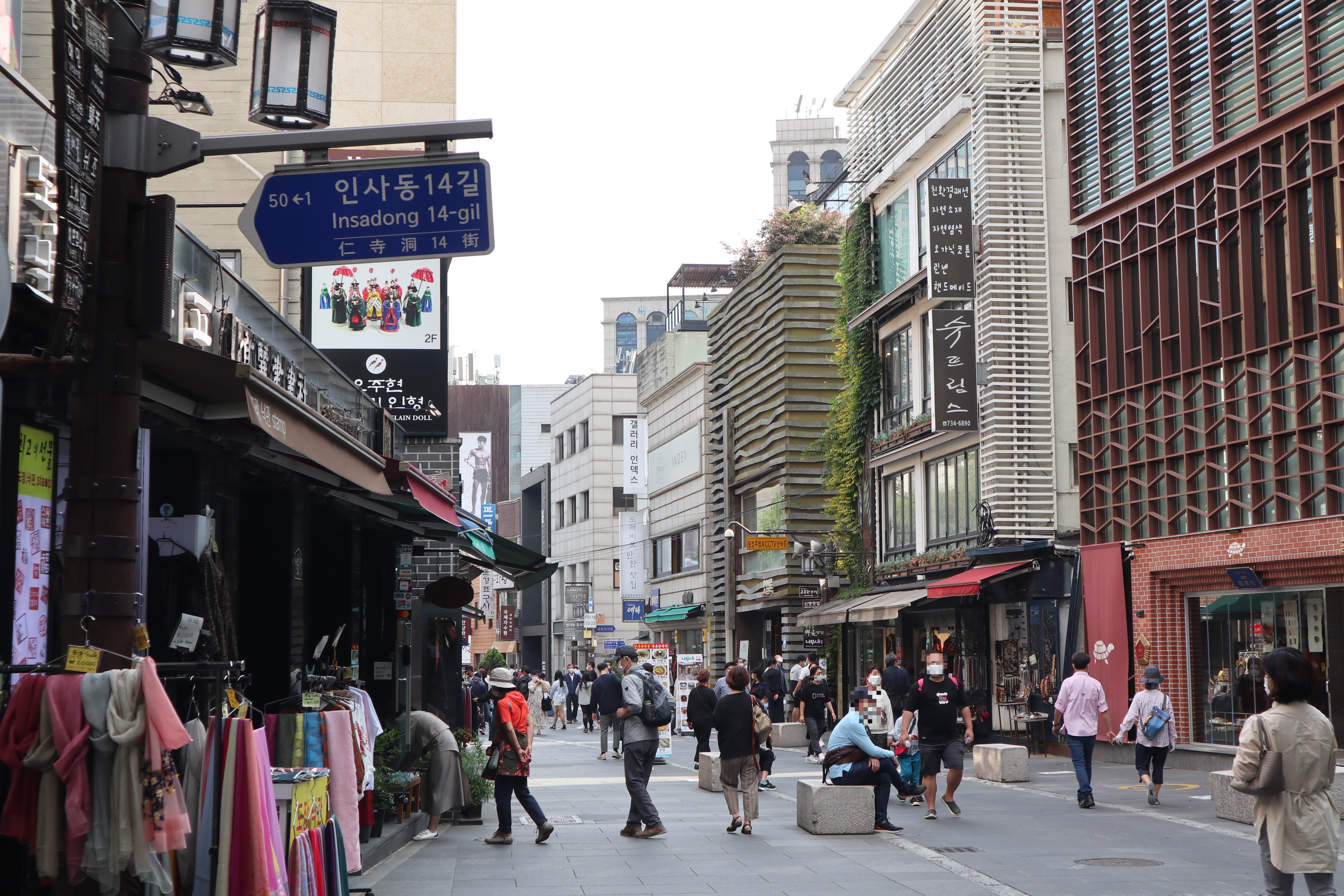

Korean name
- Hangul: 인사동
- Hanja: 仁寺洞
- RR: Insa-dong
- MR: Insa-dong

Insa-dong (Korean: 인사동) is a dong, or neighborhood, in Jongno District, Seoul, South Korea. Its main street is Insadong-gil, which is connected to a number of alleys that lead deeper into the district, with modern galleries and tea shops. Historically, it was the largest market for antiques and artwork in Korea.

Stretching across 12.7 hectares (or 31.4 acres), the district is bordered by Gwanhun-dong to the north, Nagwon-dong to the east, and Jongno 2-ga and Jeokseon-dong to the south, and Gongpyeong-dong to the west.

== History ==
Insadong originally comprised two towns whose names ended in the syllables In (仁) and Sa (寺), from the names of two districts, Gwanin-bang and Daesa-dong, of Hanseongbu, which is now the city of Seoul. They were divided by a stream which ran along Insadong's current main street. Insadong began 500 years ago as an area of residence for government officials. During the early Joseon period (1392–1897), the place belonged to Gwanin-bang and Gyeonpyeong-bang, where bang is an administrative unit at the time. During the Japanese occupation, wealthy Korean residents were forced to move and sell their belongings, at which point the site became an area for antiques trading.

After the end of the Korean War, the area became a center of South Korea's artistic life and cafe culture. It was a popular destination among foreign visitors to South Korea during the 1960s, who called the area "Mary's Alley". It gained in popularity among international tourists during the 1988 Seoul Olympics. In 2000 the area was renovated, and, after protest, the rapid modernization of the area was halted for two years beginning that year. In recent years the backstreets of Insadong have continued to be gentrified with cafes, garden restaurants, and traditional pension-style accommodations.

== Sights ==
Insadong-gil is "well known as a traditional street to both locals and foreigners" and represents the "culture of the past and the present". It contains a mixture of historical and modern atmosphere and is a "unique area of Seoul that truly represents the cultural history of the nation." The majority of the traditional buildings originally belonged to merchants and bureaucrats. Some larger residences, built for retired government officials during the Joseon period, can also be seen. Most of these older buildings are now used as restaurants or shops. Among the historically significant buildings located in the area are Unhyeongung mansion, Jogyesa, one of the most significant Korean Buddhist temples, and Seungdong Presbyterian Church, one of Korea's oldest Presbyterian churches. The central temple of Cheondoism can also be found in the vicinity, which was completed in 1921.

The area is well known for sightseeing, with approximately 100,000 visitors on Sundays reported in 2000. Insadong is also a visiting spot for foreign dignitaries such as Queen Elizabeth II and the princess of Spain and the Netherlands. It contains 40 percent of the nation's antique shops and art galleries as well as 90 percent of the traditional stationery shops. Particularly noteworthy is Tongmungwan, the oldest bookstore in Seoul, and Kyung-in Art Gallery, the oldest tea house. There are daily calligraphy demonstrations and pansori performances.

Ssamziegil, a shopping mall that concentrates on specialty stores of handcrafts, is also a prominent destination in Insadong. It opened in 2004.

Unlike regular Starbucks, you can see a unique Starbucks with a sign written in Korean that reflects the characteristics of Insa-dong.

== Other attractions ==
Unhyeongung, Bosingak bell pavilion, and Jongno Tower can be found in this area. Samcheongdong is also a nearby dong with an art scene. There is also an express bus to the resort island of Namiseom where the popular Korean drama Winter Sonata was filmed.

The area is on the Seoul list of Asia's 10 greatest street food cities for the gimbap, odeng, and bungeoppang.

== Information centers ==
Insadong has three information centers for the neighborhood and for Seoul generally. The North and South Information Centers are at the entrances to Insadong's main street, and the Insa P. R. Center is on the opposite side of Ssamziegil, a well-known shopping center in Insadong. At the Insa P. R. Center, visitors can have a hanbok (Korean traditional dress) experience.

== Transport ==
- Jonggak Station (Station #131 on Line 1)
- Jongno 3-ga Station (Station #130 on Line 1, Station #329 on Line 3, Station #534 on Line 5)
- Anguk Station (Station #328 on Seoul Metro Korean Patriotic Organization Line 3)

In January 2013, the Seoul Metropolitan Rapid Transit Corporation published free guidebooks in three languages: English, Japanese, and Chinese (simplified and traditional), which feature eight tours as well as recommendations for accommodations, restaurants, and shopping centers. These were distributed from information centers in 44 subway stations, namely Itaewon Station on Line 6 and Gwanghwamun Station on Line 5.

The tours are designed with different themes, e.g. Korean traditional culture, which goes from Jongno 3-ga Station to Anguk Station and Gyeongbokgung Station on Line 3 that showcases antique shops and art galleries of this area.

== Gallery ==
Sights in Insa-dong
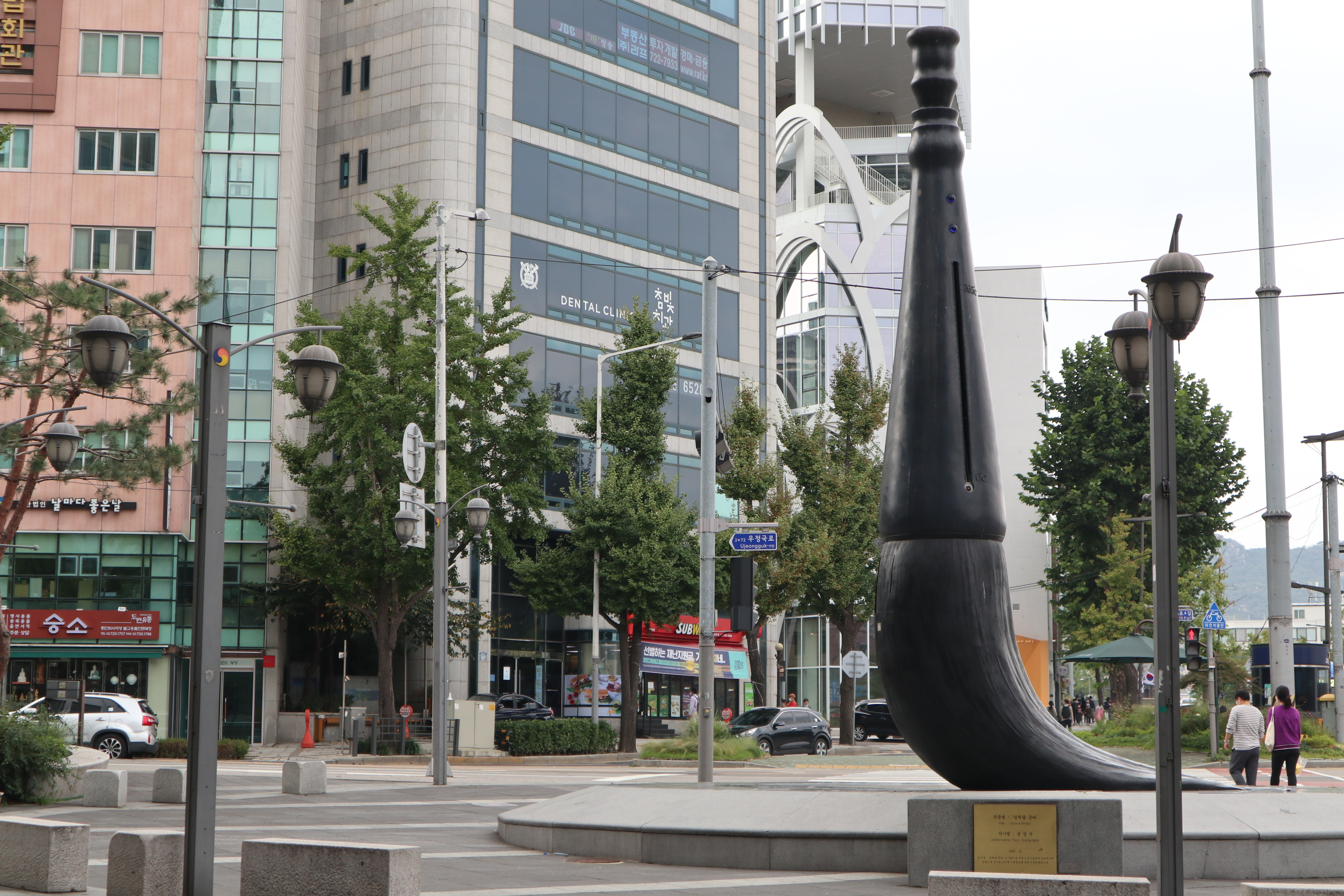
Yoon Young-seok, 'Draw A Stroke', 2007

Insadong-gil (main street)

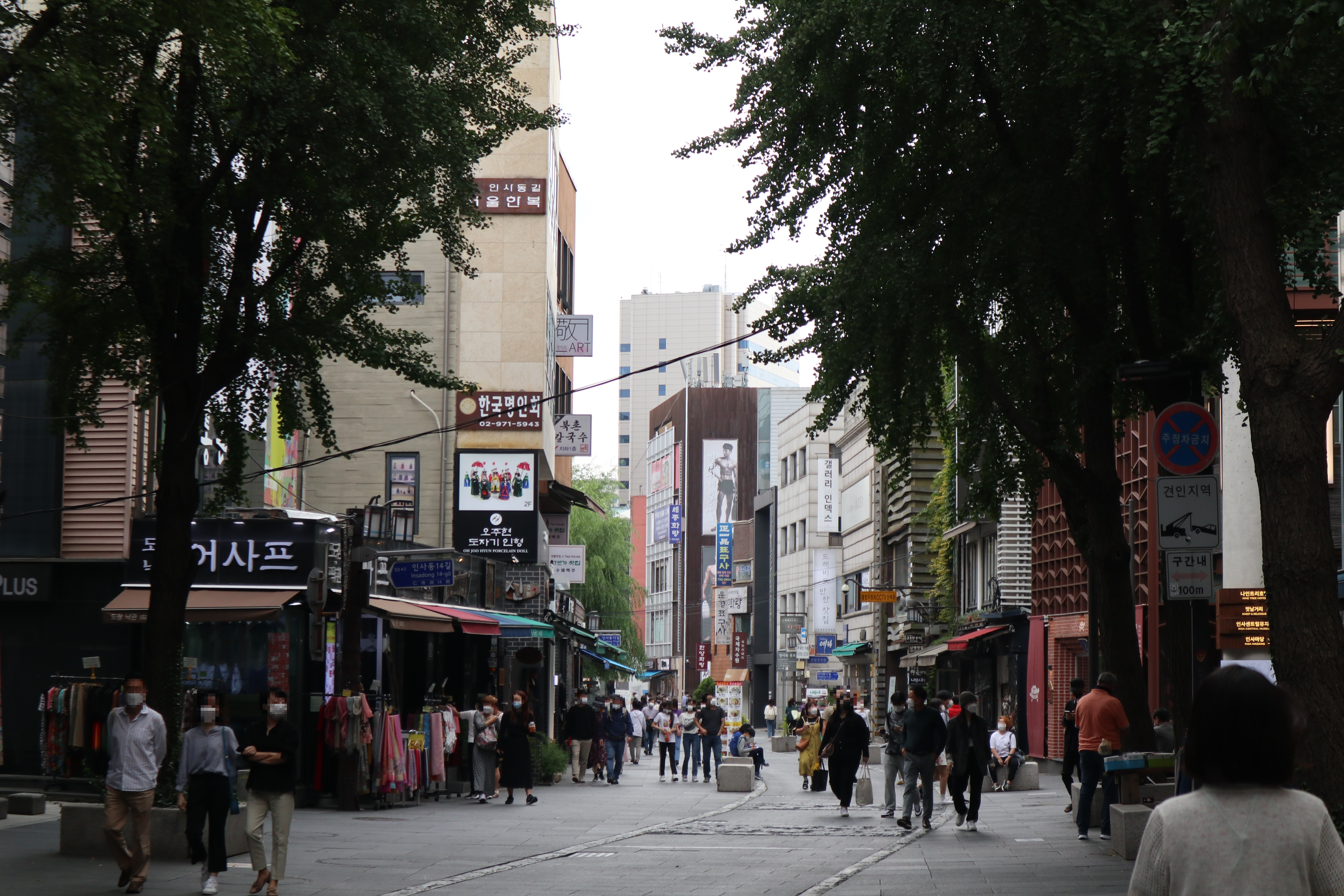
Insadong-gil

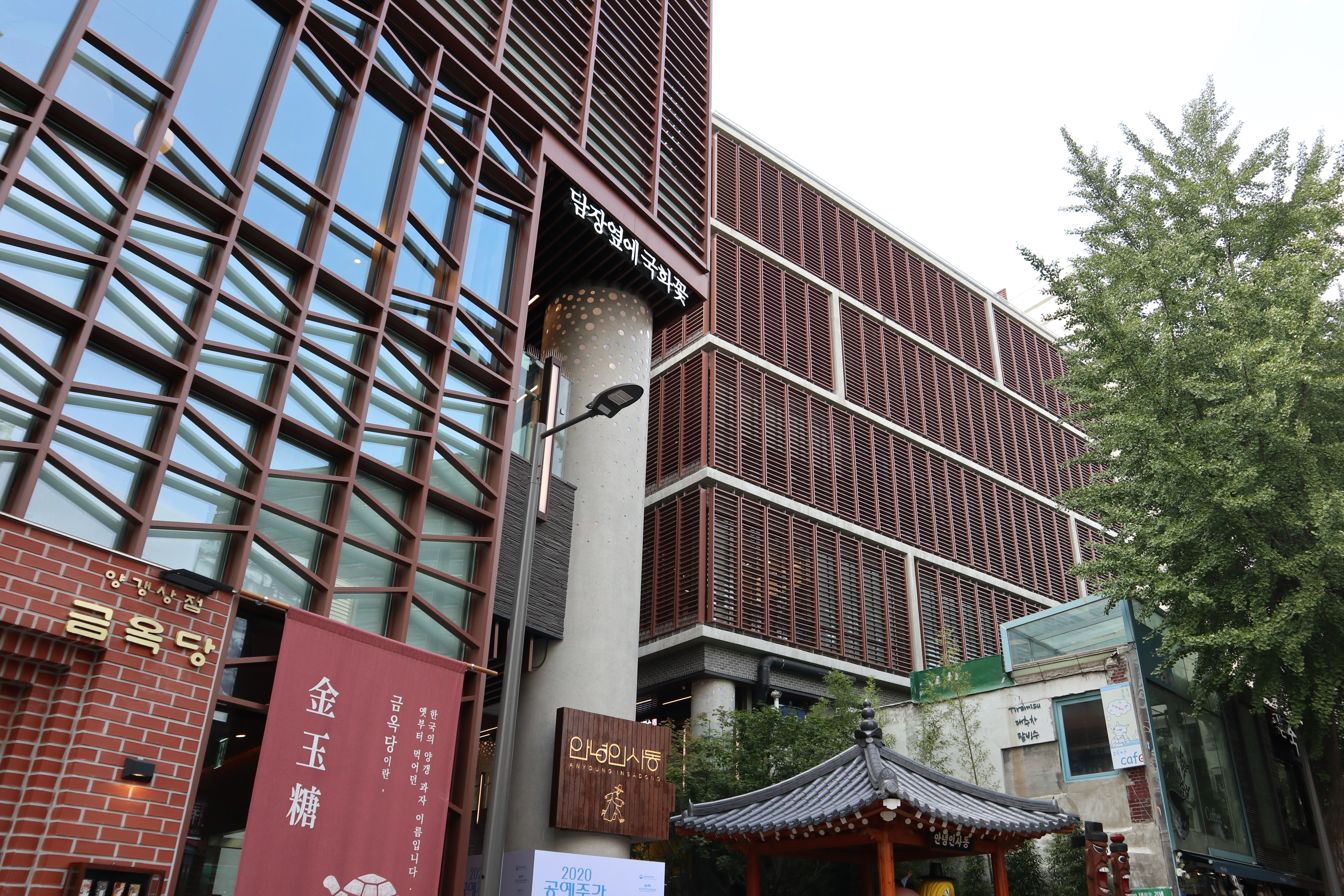
Exterior of 'Anyoung Insadong (안녕 인사동)' shopping complex

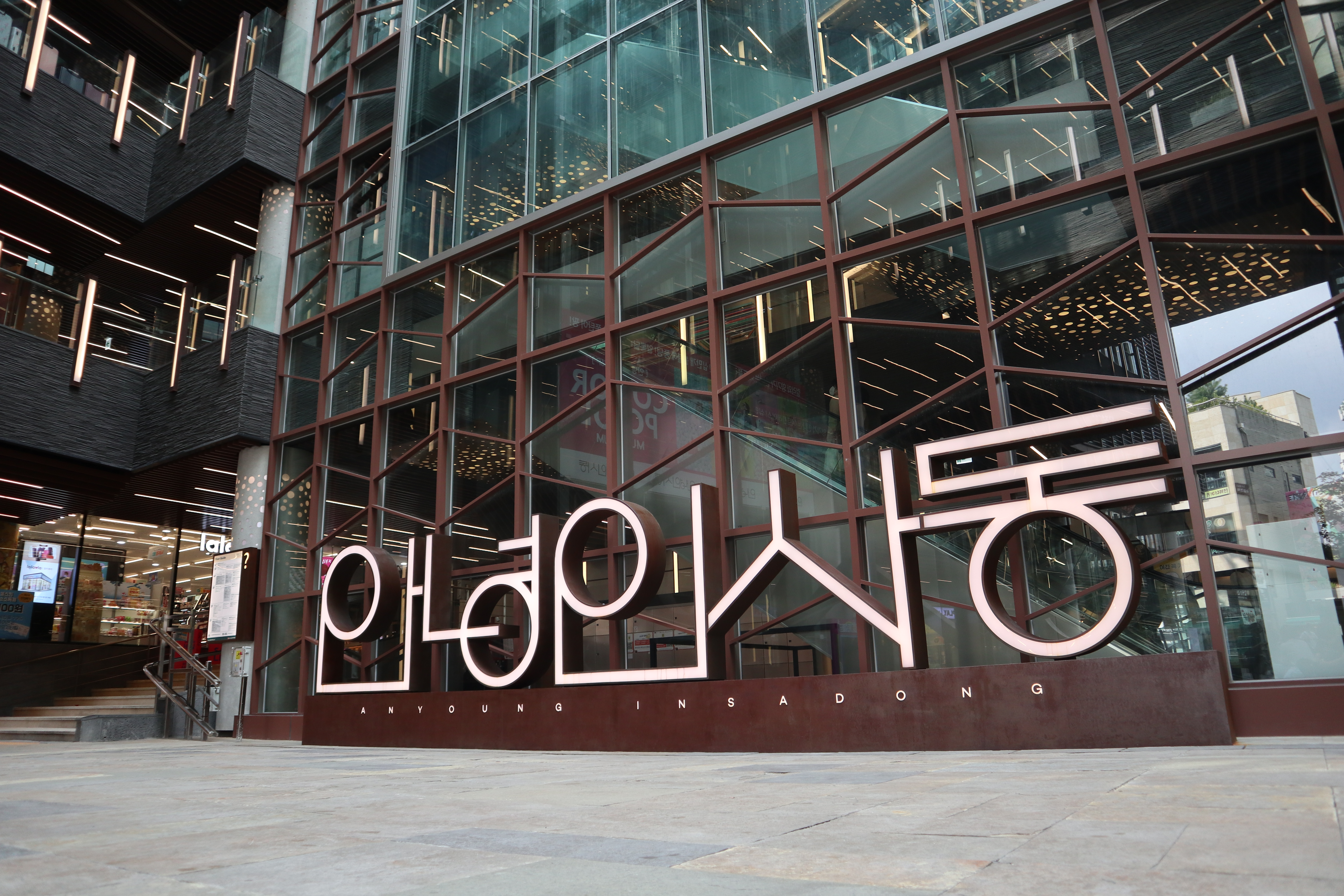
Logo of 'Anyoung Insadong' shopping complex

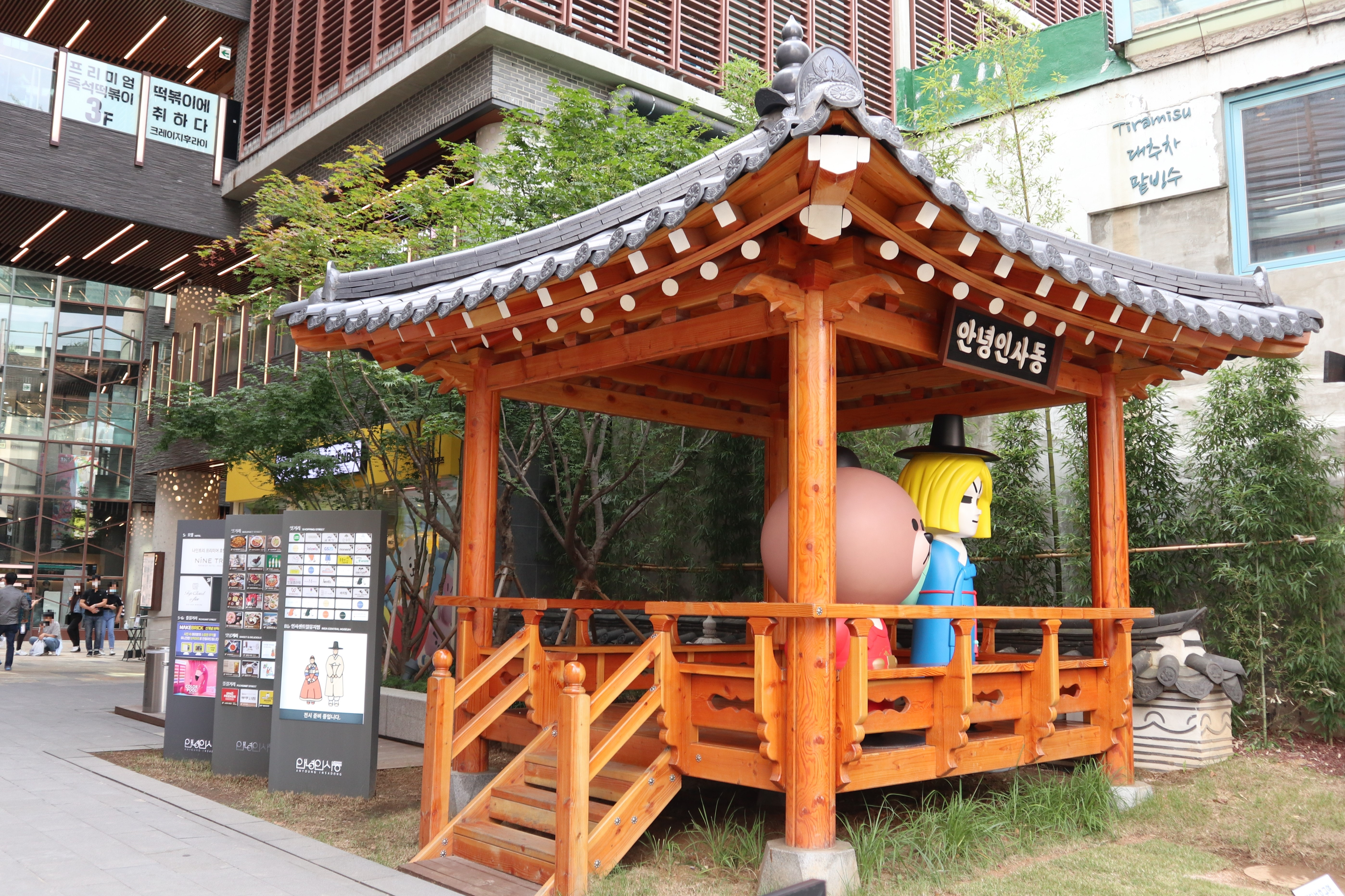
Pavilion at 'Anyoung Insadong' shopping complex

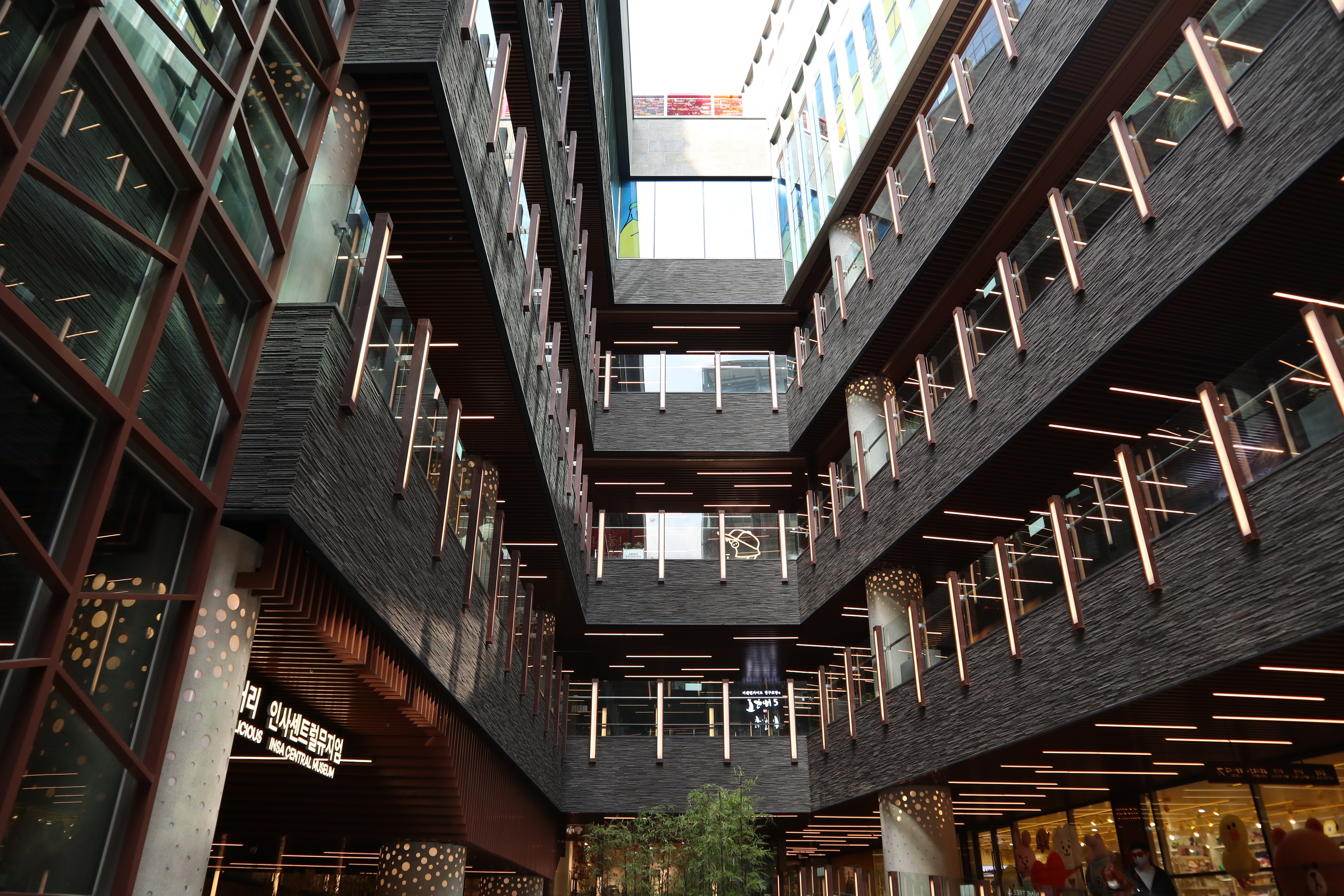
Inside 'Anyoung Insadong' shopping complex

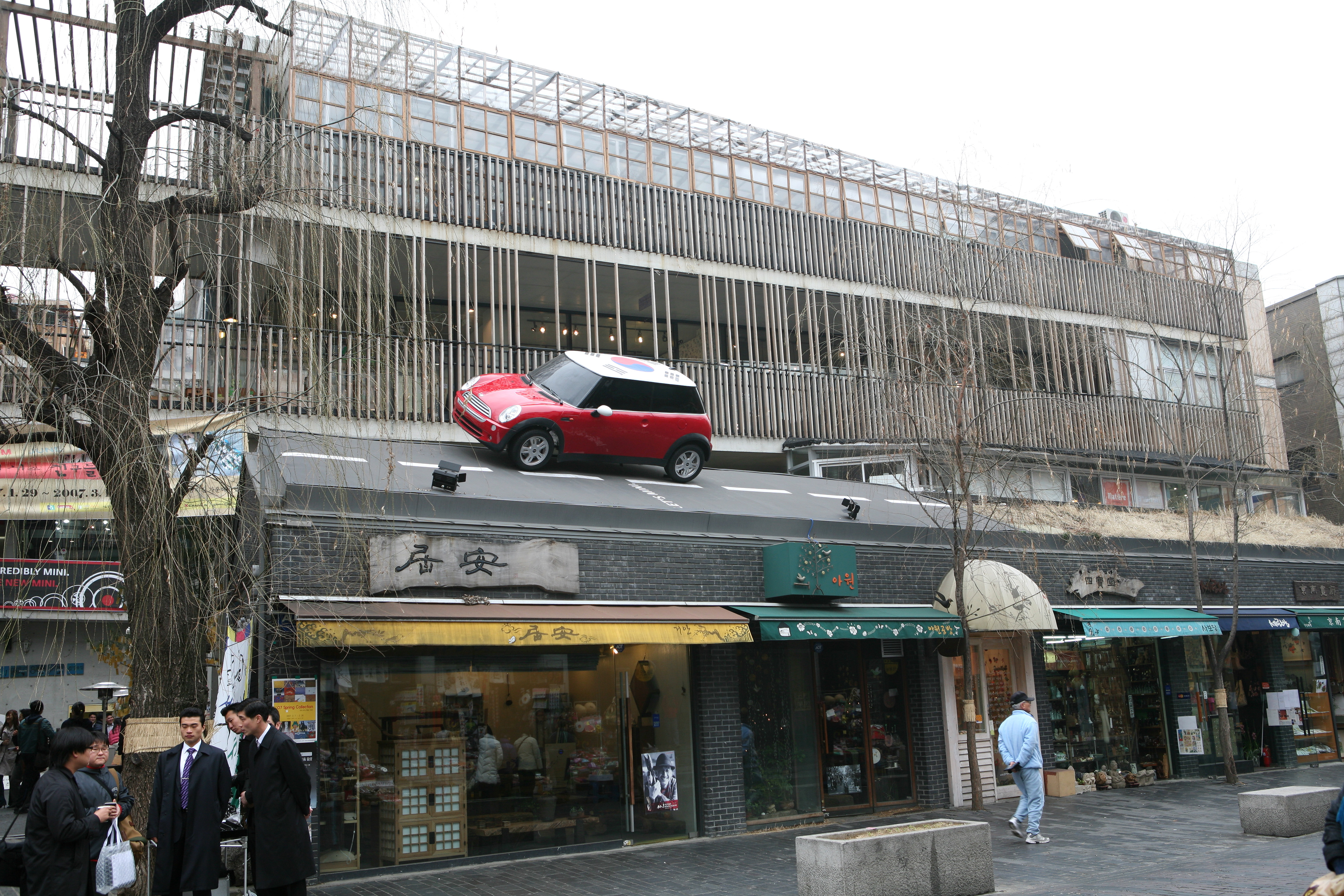
Exterior of 'Ssamziegil (쌈지길)' shopping complex

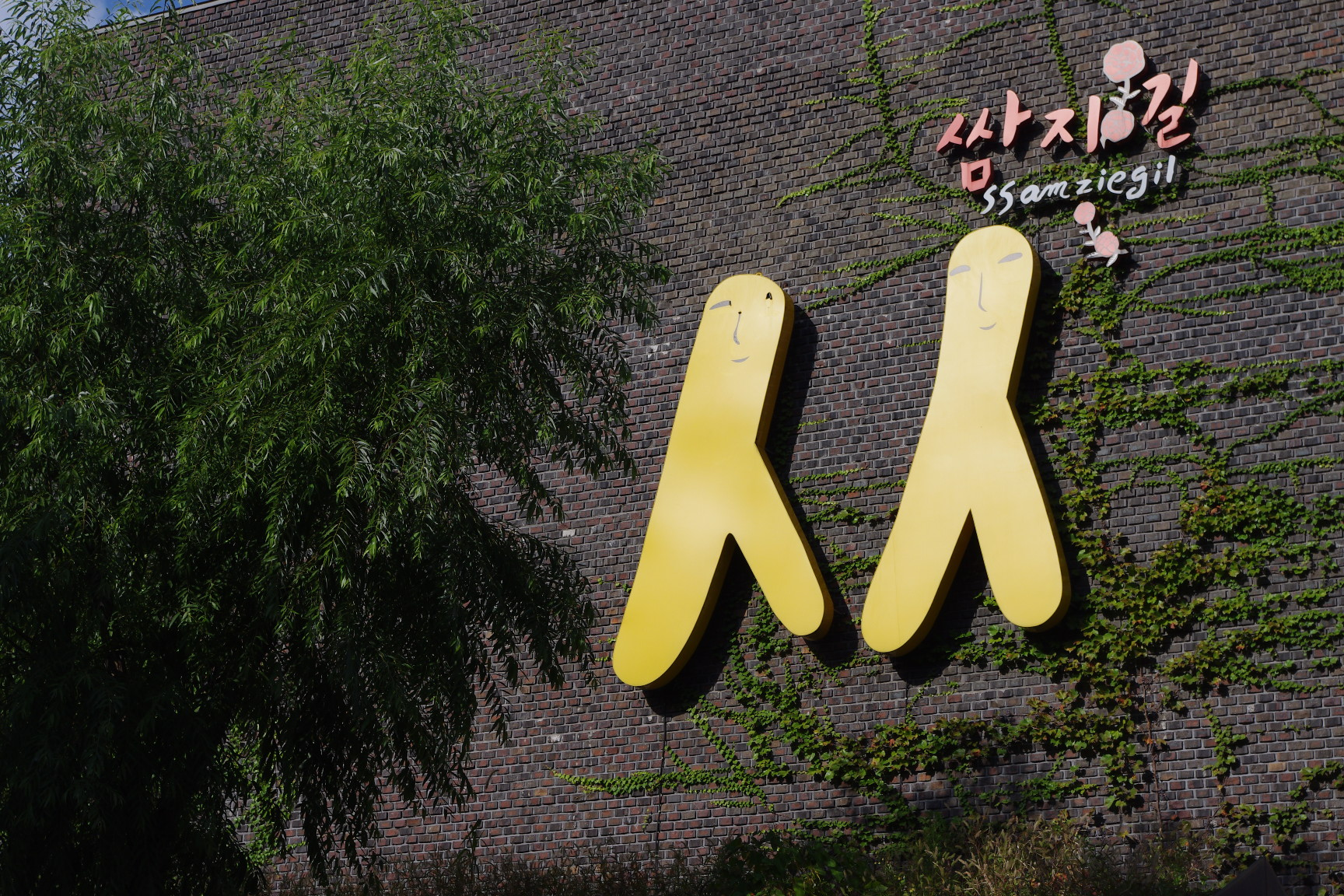
Logo of 'Ssamziegil' shopping complex

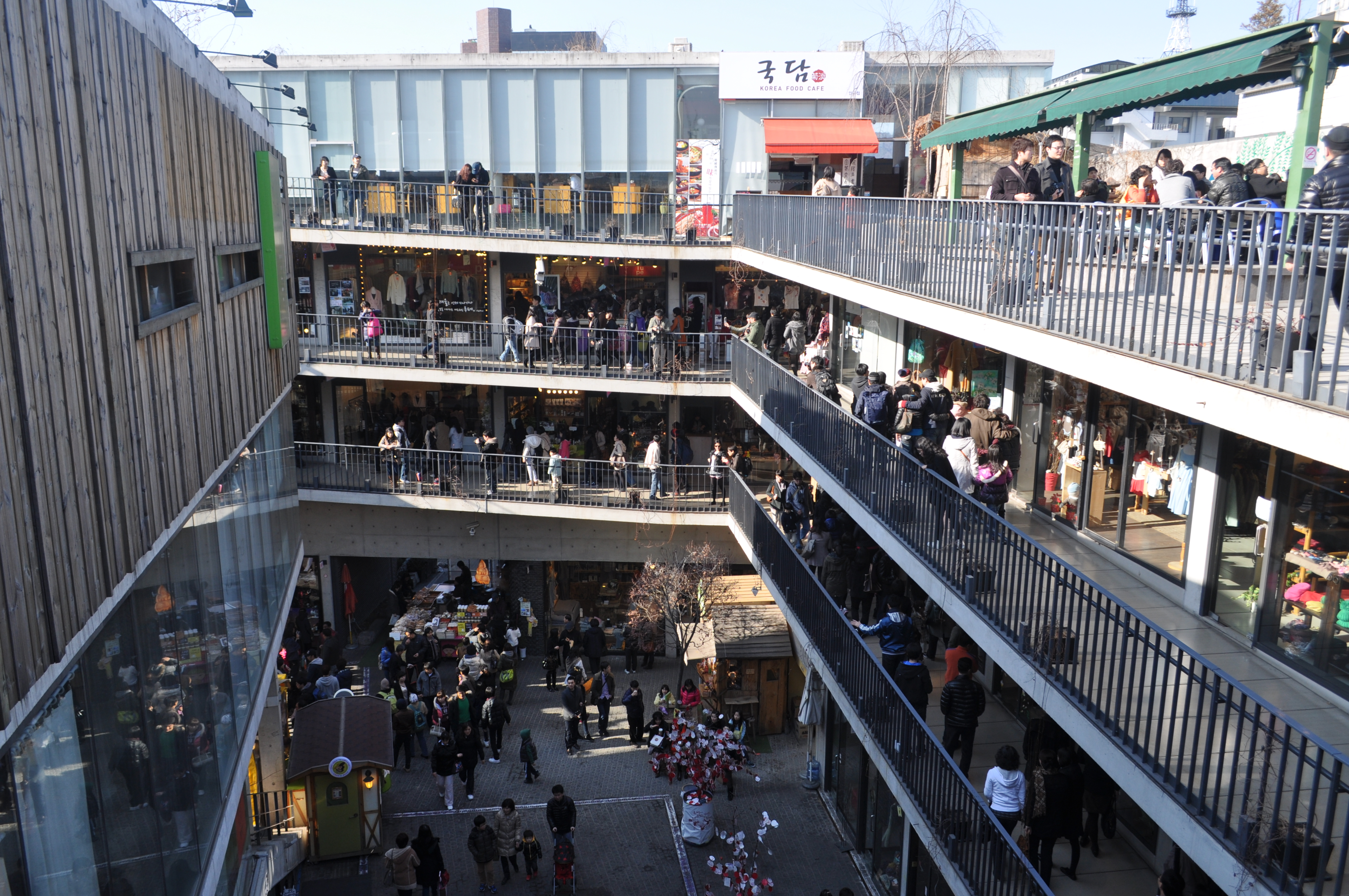
Inside 'Ssamziegil' shopping complex

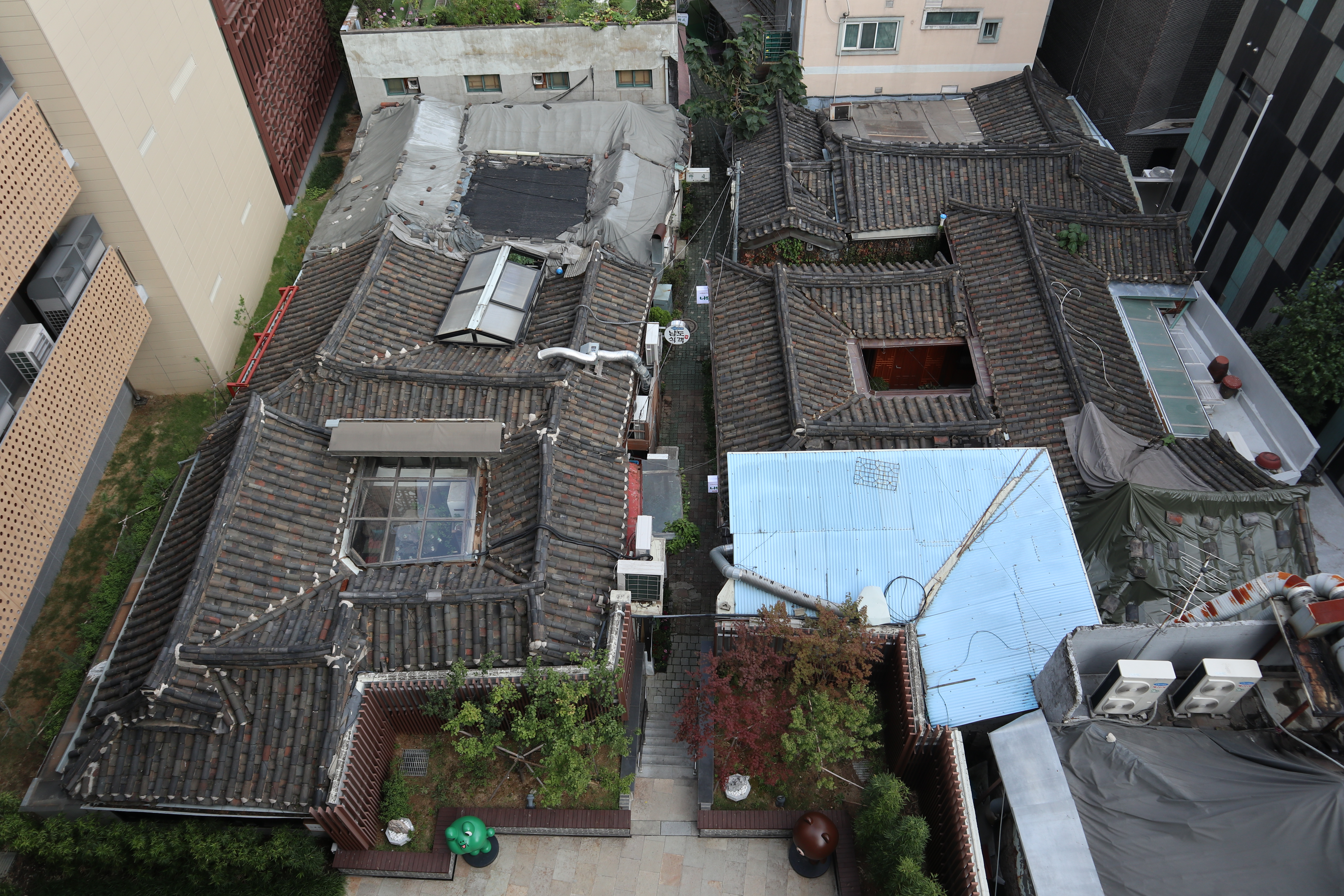
Traditional Hanok roofs

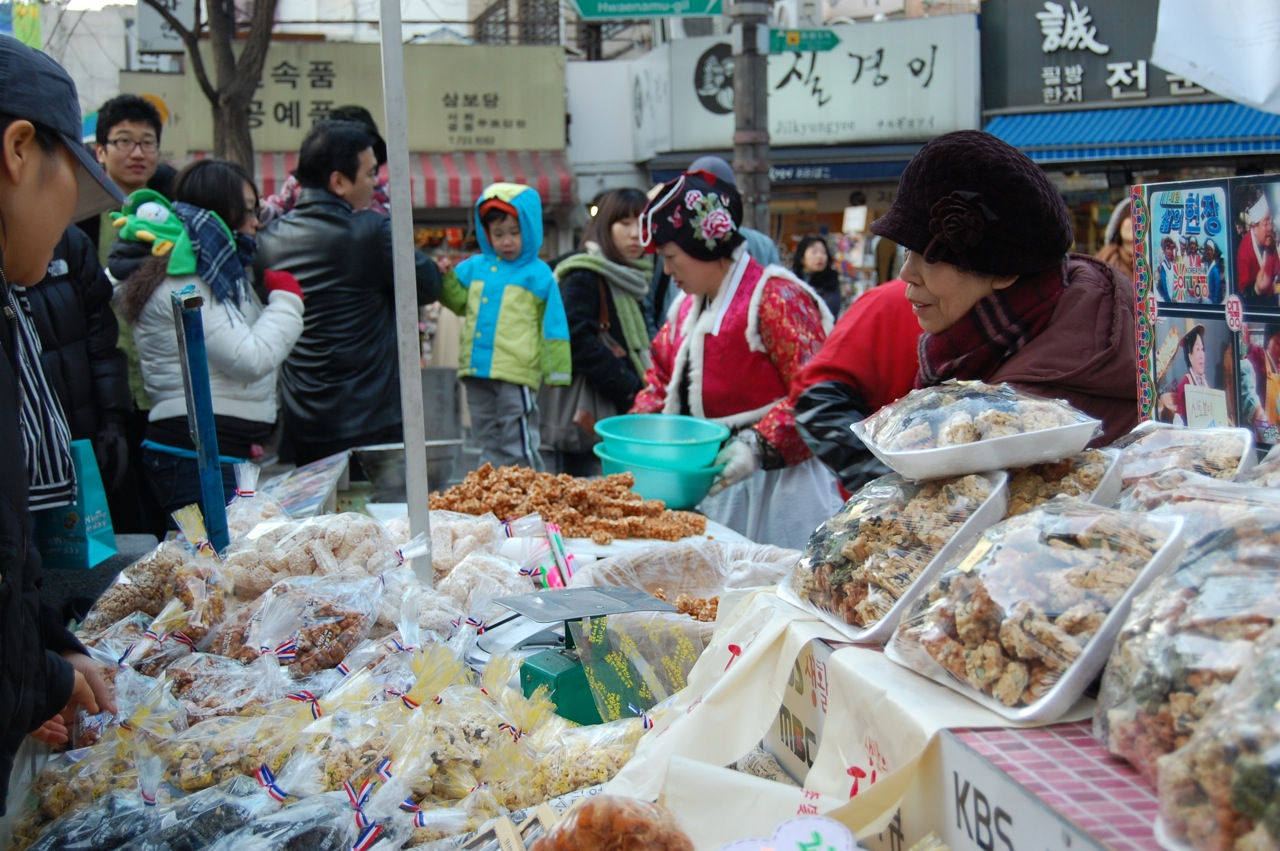
Traditional Korean snacks (Hangwa) being made

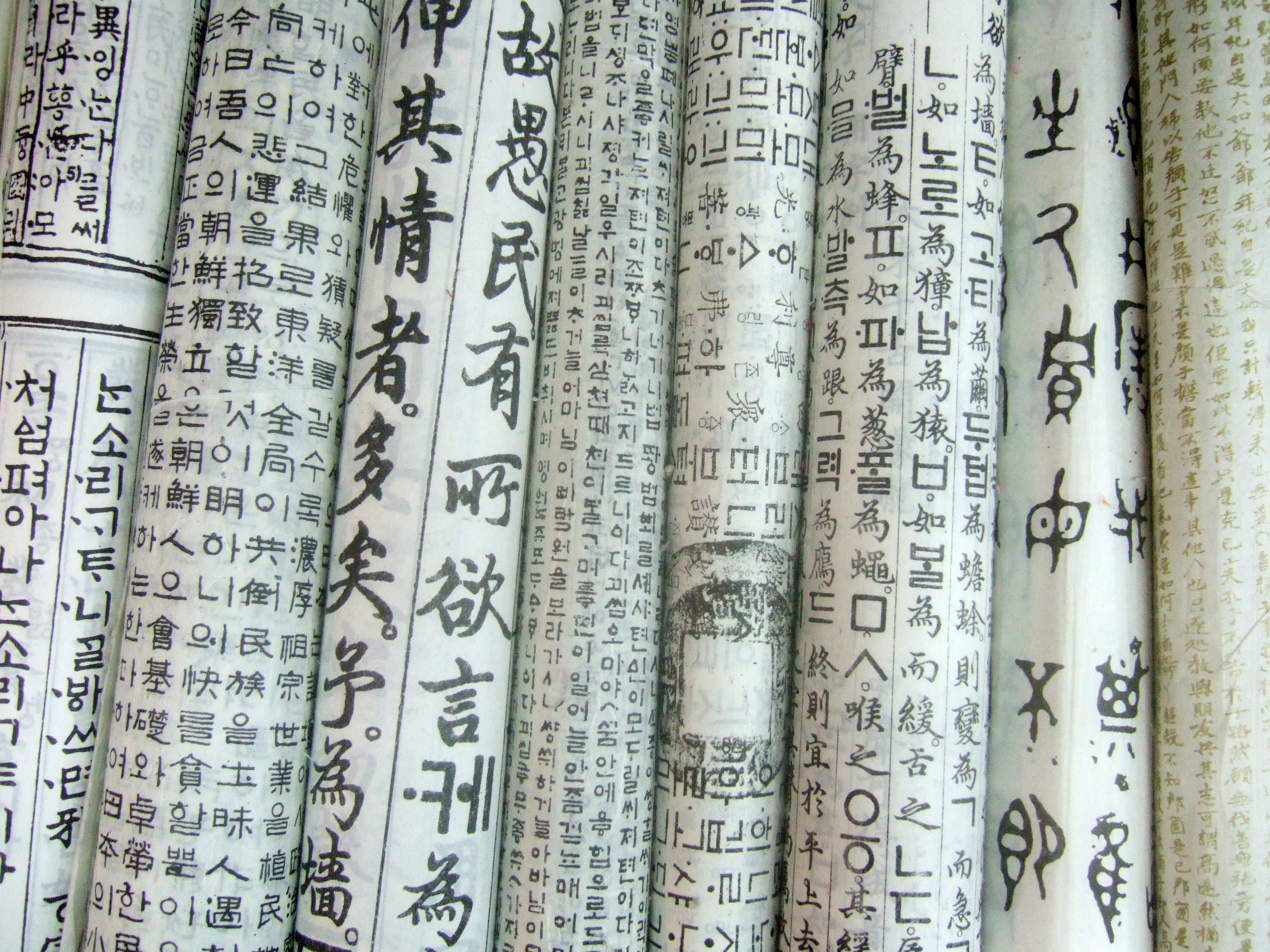
Hand-pressed papers

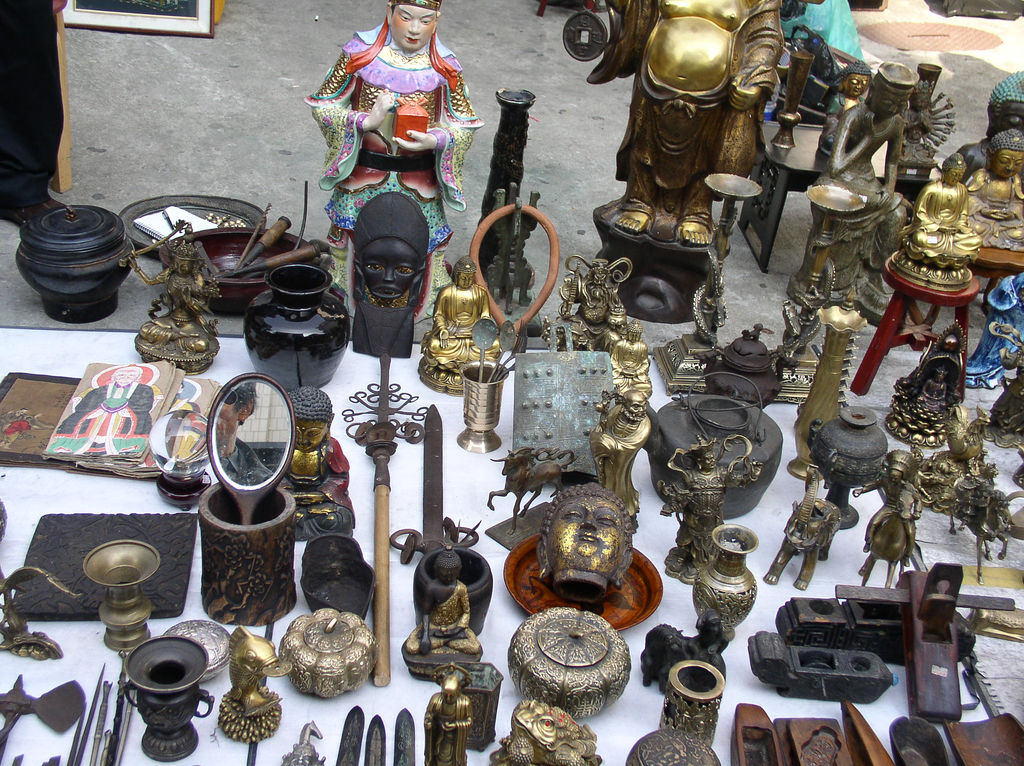
Buddhist sculptures in a flea market

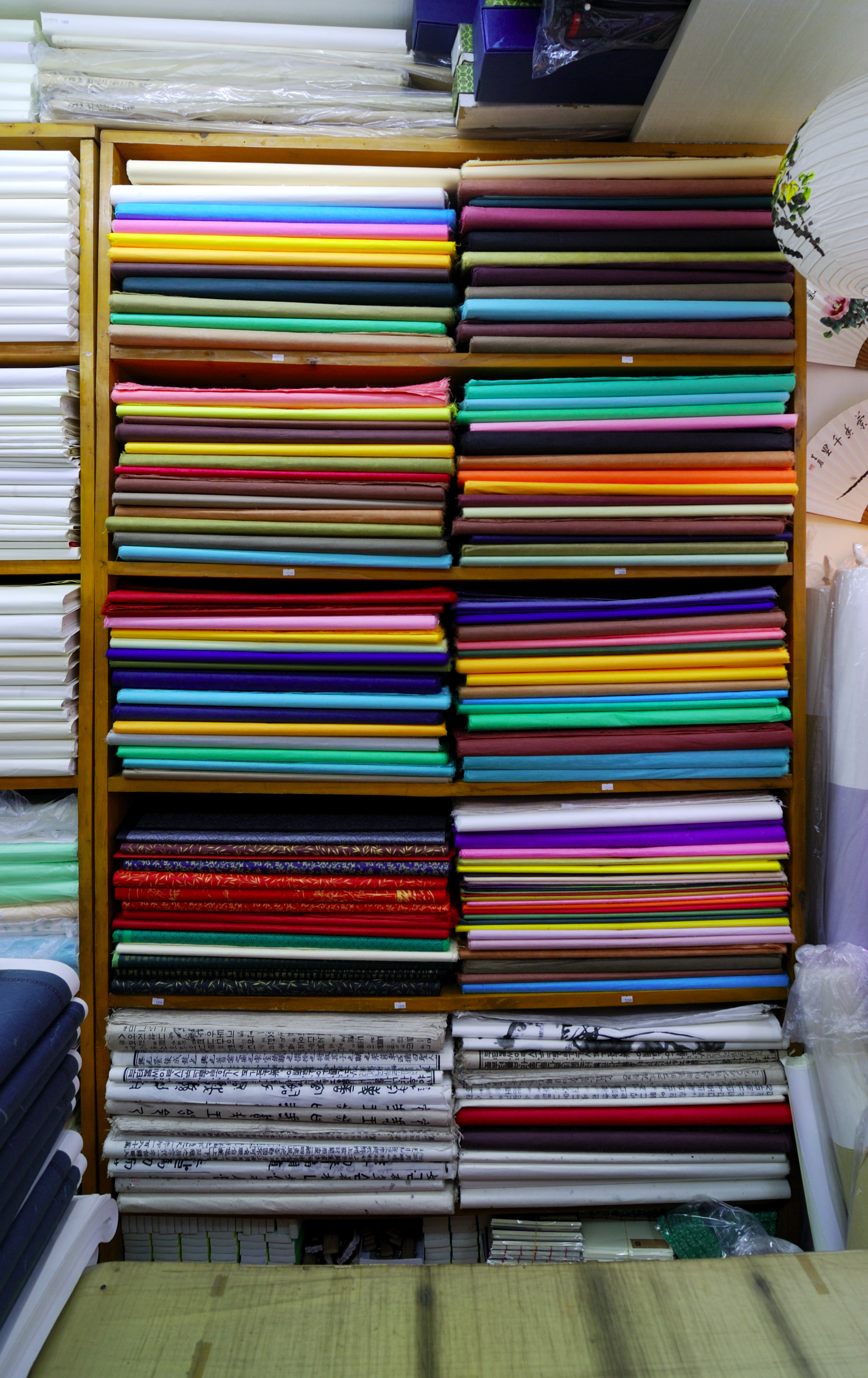
Hanji for sale in a paper store
Alleys in Insa-dong
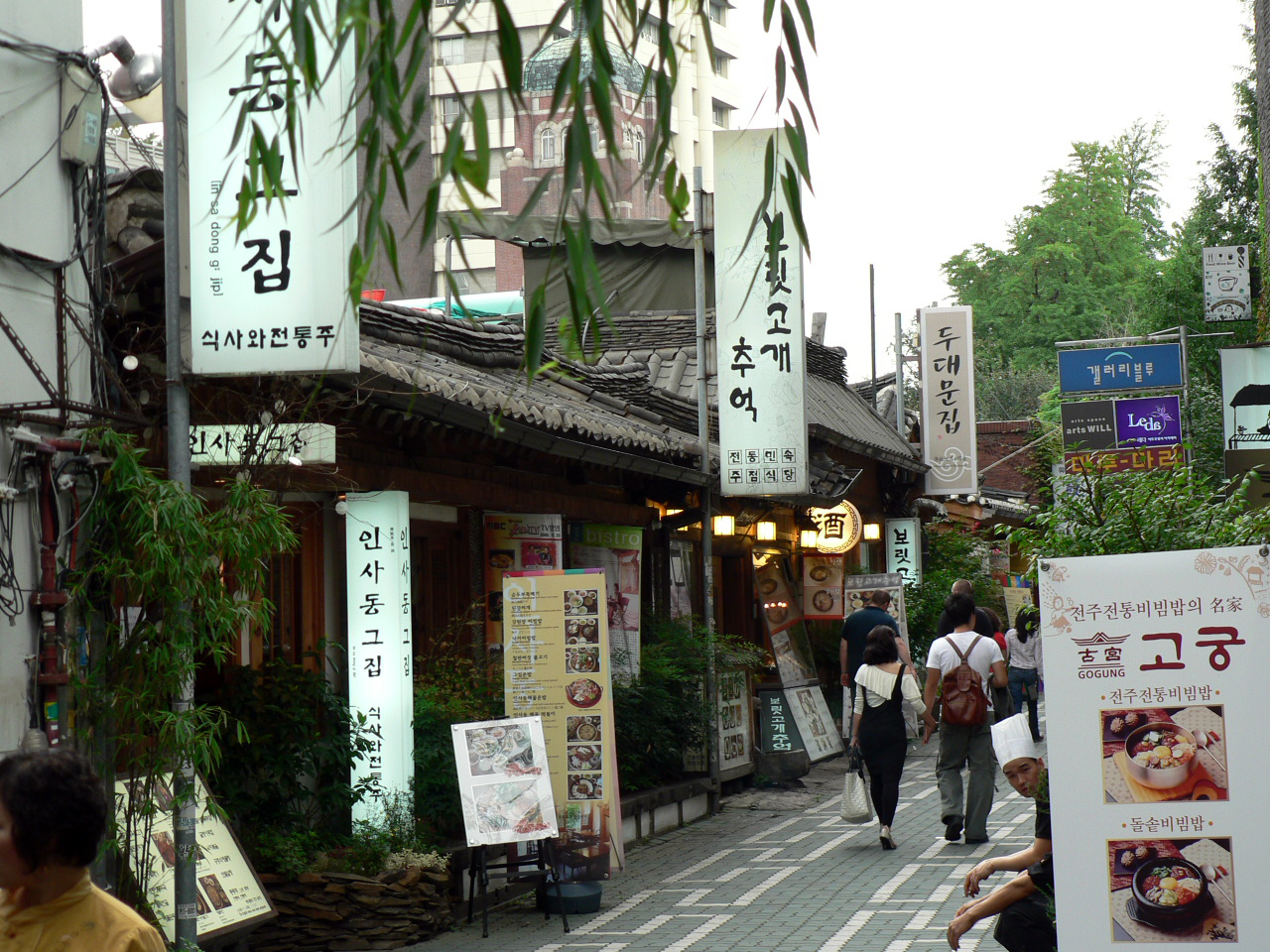
Alley with restaurants serving traditional cuisine

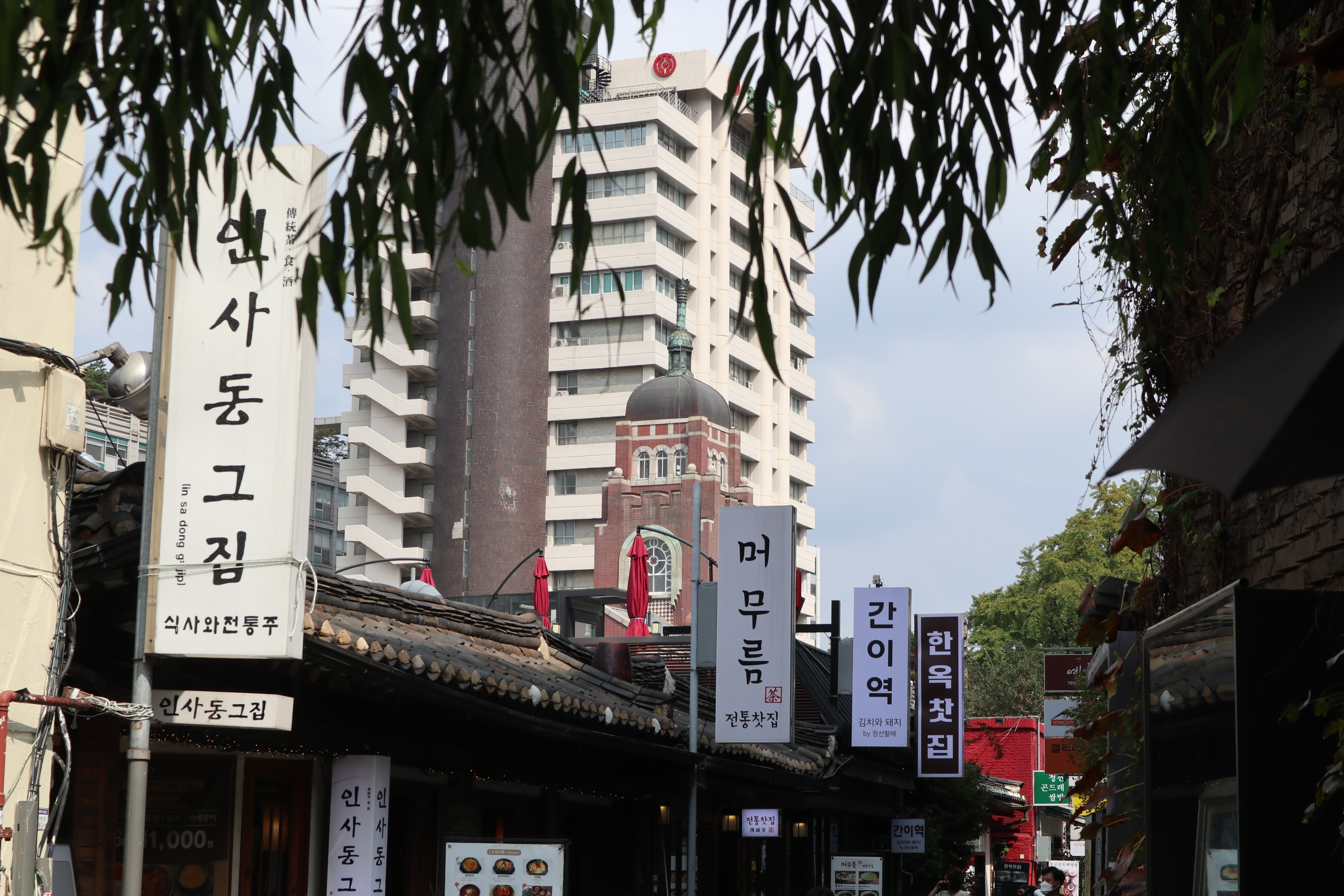
Same alley in 2020

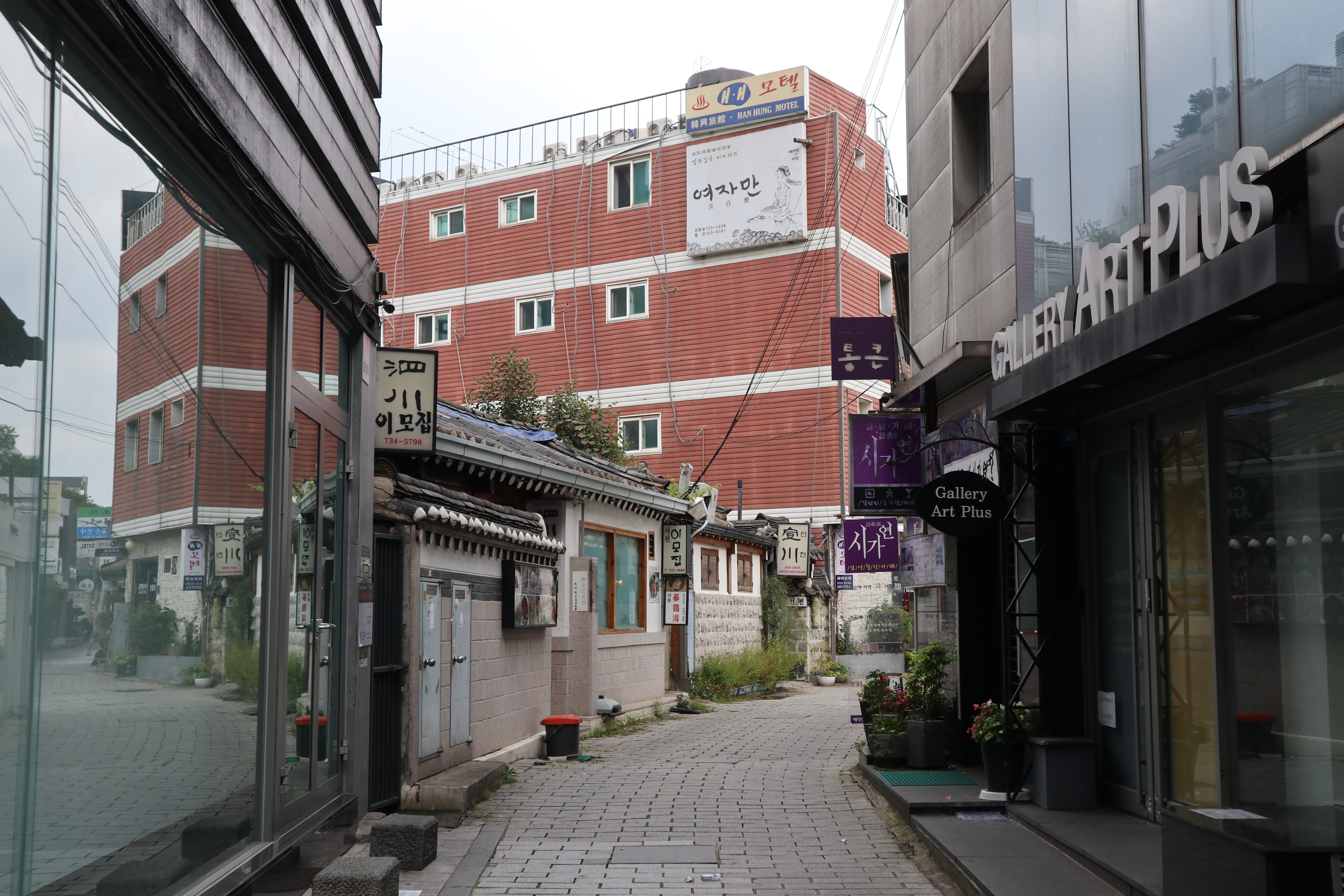

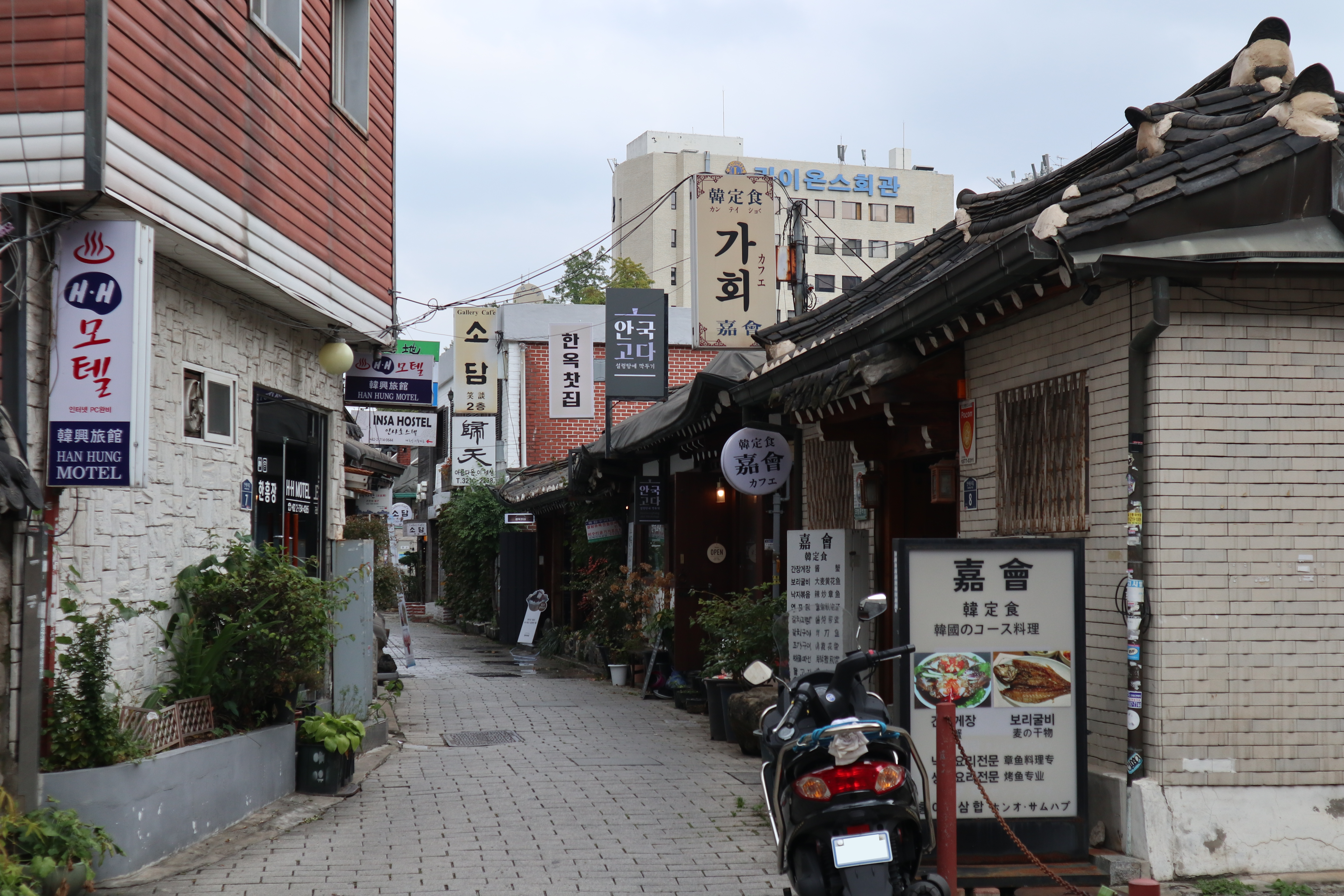

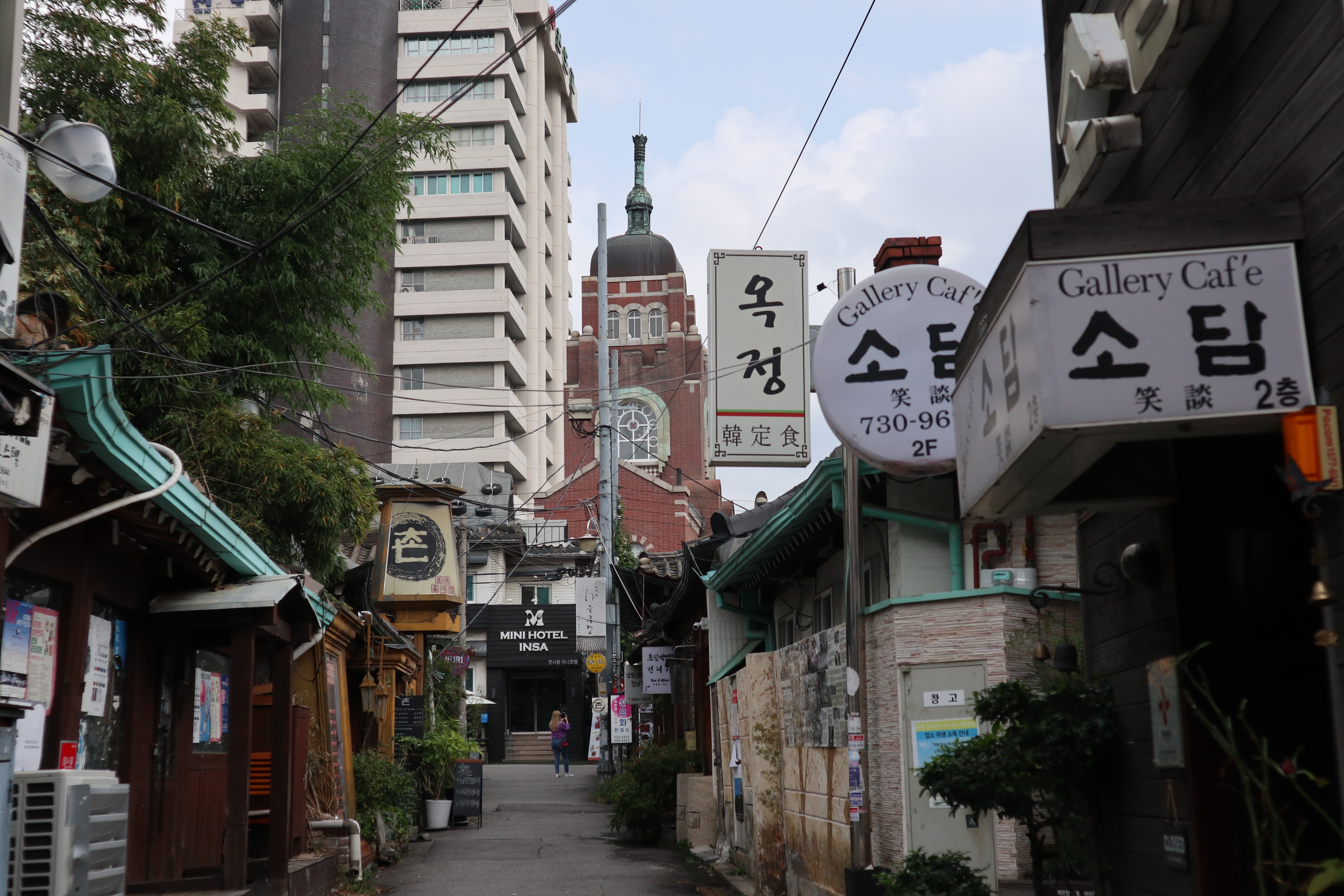
Alley pointing towards, but not connected to Cheondogyo Central Temple

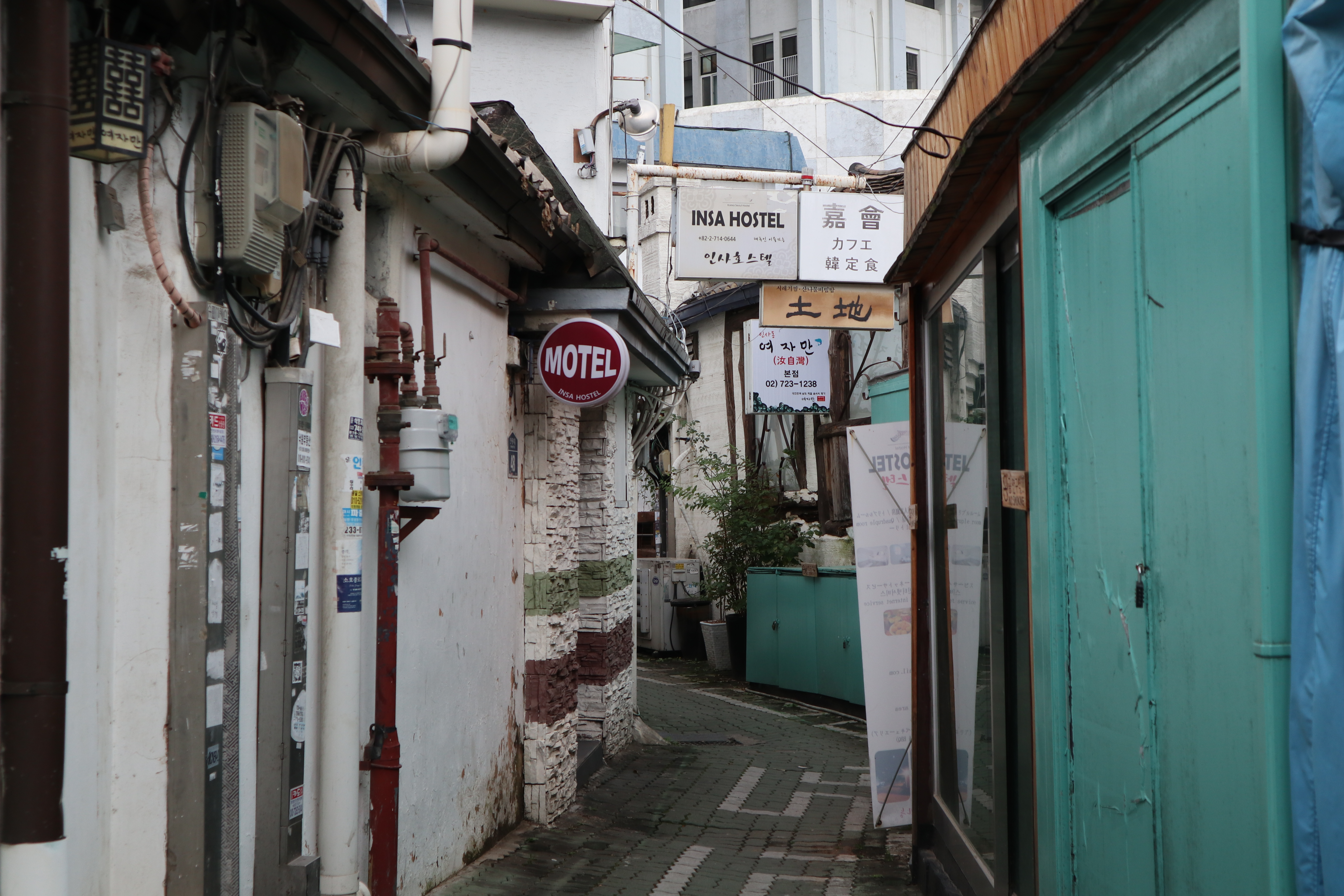

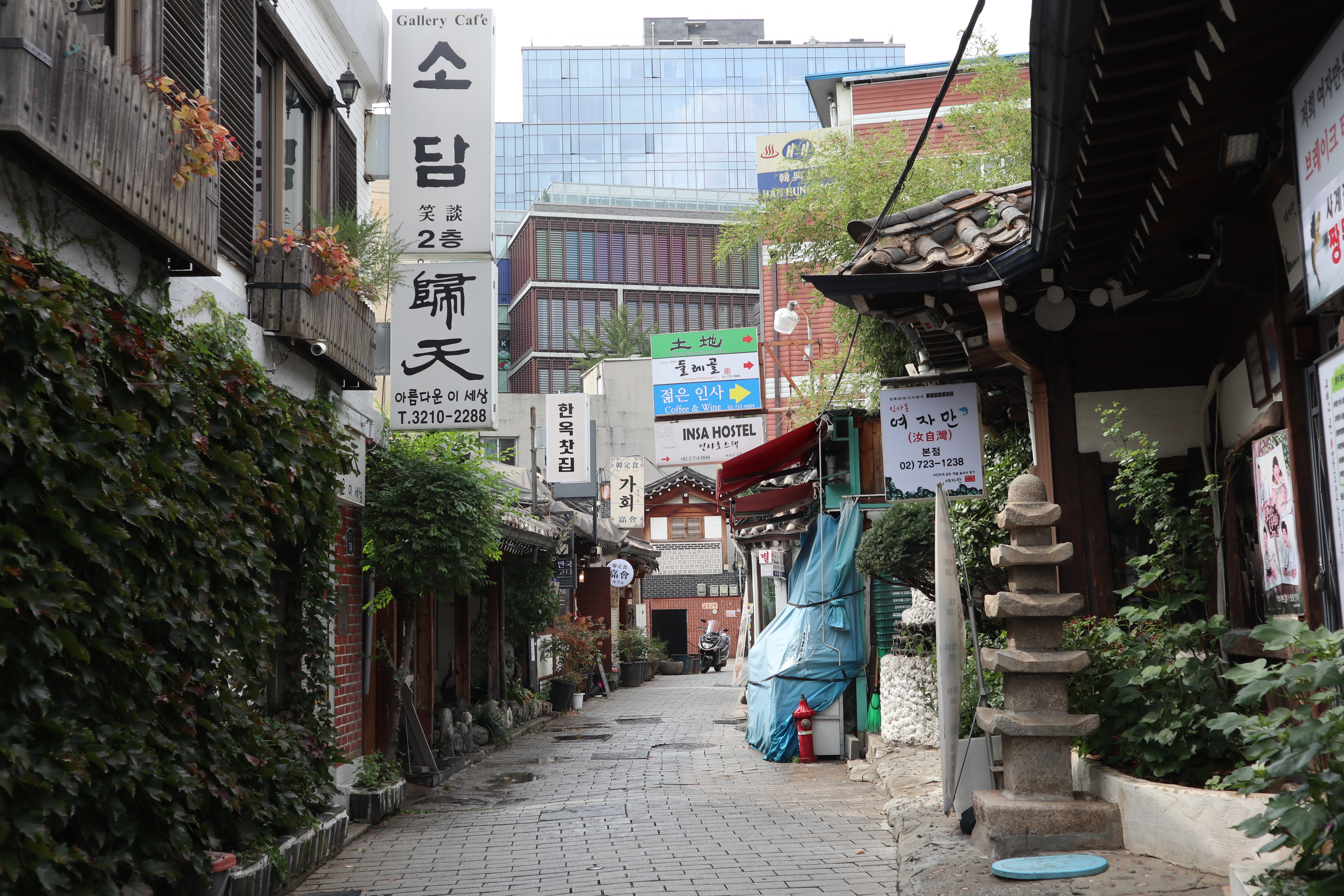

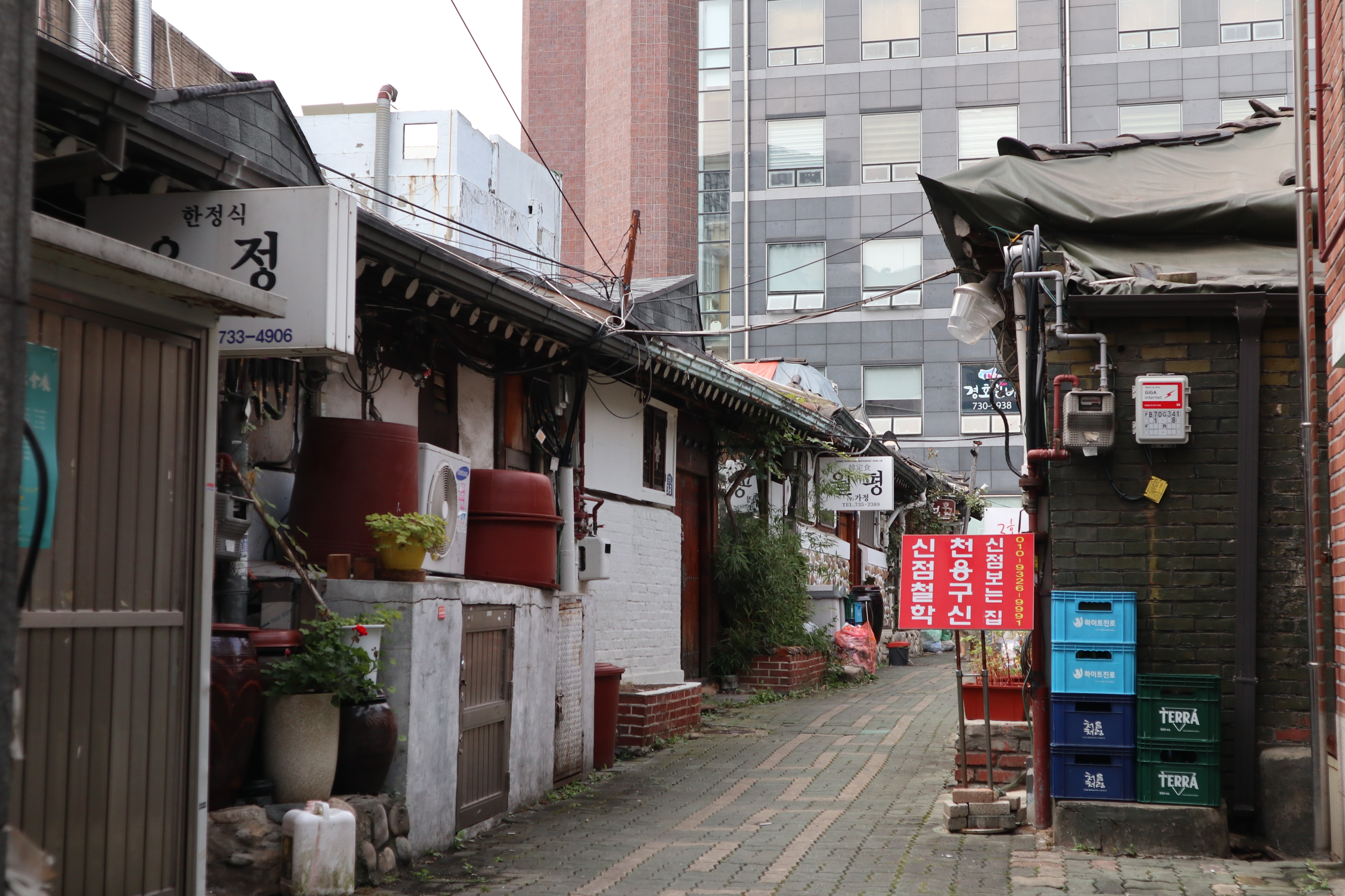

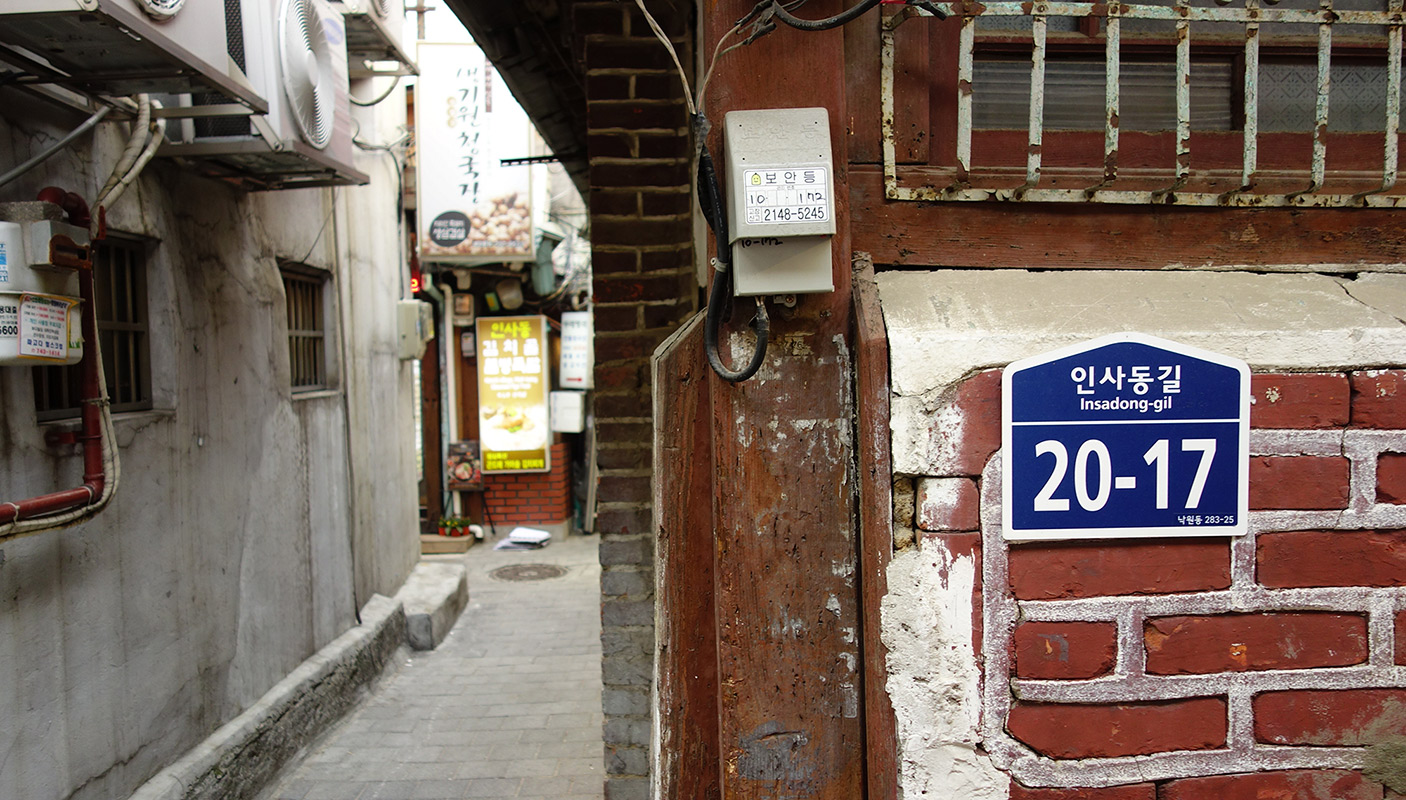

== See also ==
- Daehangno
- Bukchon Hanok Village
- Jogyesa
- Jongno District
