= Gyeongun-dong =

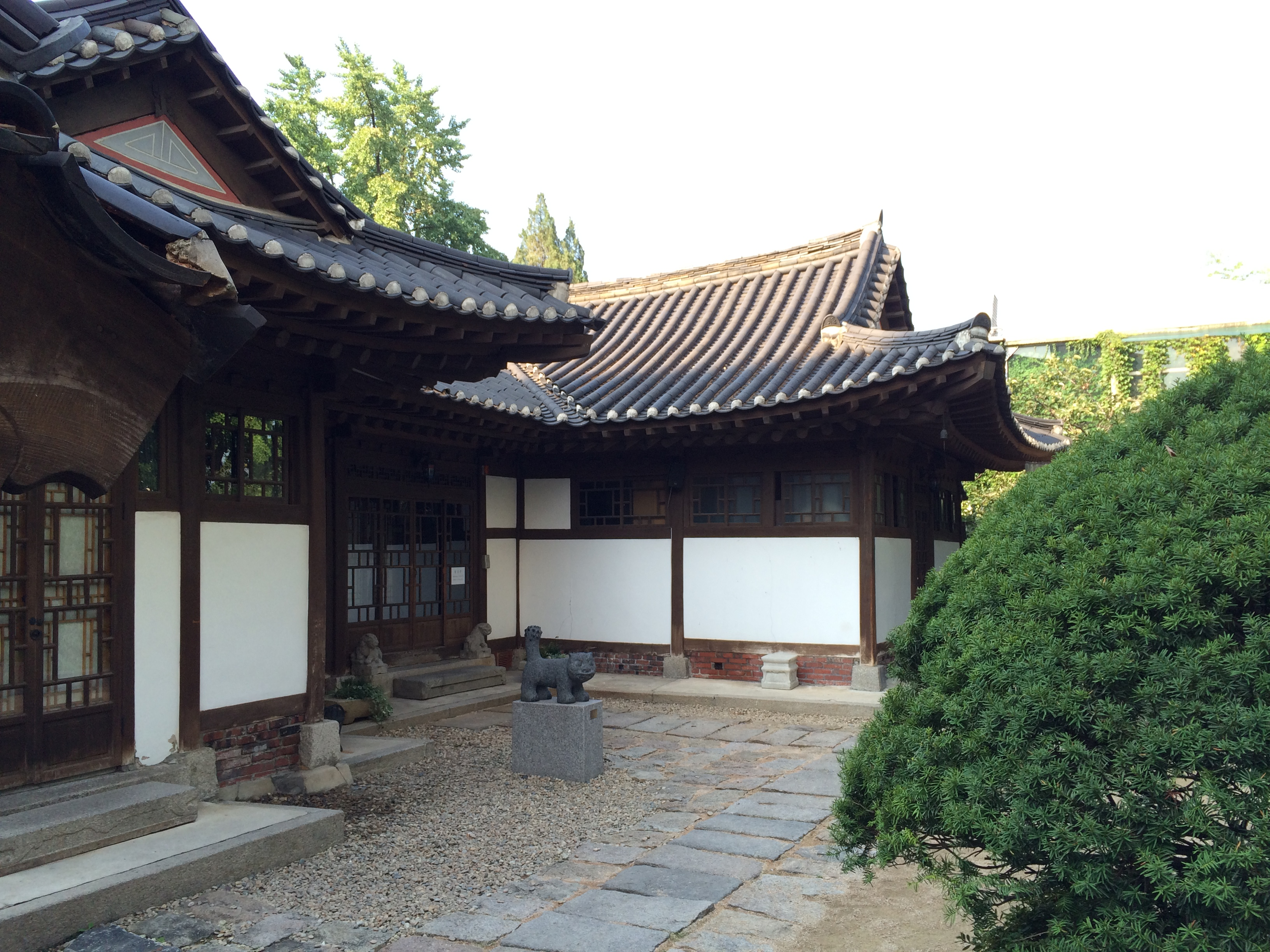
- Country: South Korea

Korean name
- Hangul: 경운동
- Hanja: 慶雲洞
- RR: Gyeongun-dong
- MR: Kyŏngun-dong

Gyeongun-dong (Korean: 경운동) is a dong (neighborhood) of Jongno District, Seoul, South Korea. It is a legal dong (법정동 法定洞) governed under its administrative dong (행정동 行政洞), Jongno 1, 2, 3, 4 ga-dong.

== See also ==
- Administrative divisions of South Korea
