= Gongpyeong-dong =

- Interactive map of Gongpyeong-dong
- Country: South Korea

Area
  - Total: 0.04 km^{2} (0.015 sq mi)

Korean name
- Hangul: 공평동
- Hanja: 公平洞
- RR: Gongpyeong-dong
- MR: Kongp'yŏng-dong

Gongpyeong-dong (Korean: 공평동) is a dong (neighborhood) of Jongno District, Seoul, South Korea. It is a legal dong (beopjeong-dong 法定洞) governed under its administrative dong (haengjeong-dong 行政洞), Jongno 1, 2, 3, 4 ga-dong.

The area is bordered by Gyeonji-dong to the north, Insa-dong to the east, and Seorin-dong and Gwancheol-dong to the south, and Cheongjin-dong to the west. Until the early Joseon period (1392–1897), the place belonged to Gyeonji-bang (寬仁坊) - bang (坊) was an administrative unit during the time - of the Jungbu district (中部), Hansŏng (old name for the capital, Seoul).

== See also ==
- Insadong
- Administrative divisions of South Korea
