= Songhyeon-dong =

- Interactive map of Songhyeon-dong
- Country: South Korea

Area
  - Total: 0.05 km^{2} (0.019 sq mi)

Korean name
- Hangul: 송현동
- Hanja: 松峴洞
- RR: Songhyeon-dong
- MR: Songhyŏn-dong

Songhyeon-dong (Korean: 송현동) is a dong (neighbourhood) of Jongno District, Seoul, South Korea. It is a legal dong (법정동 法定洞) administered under its administrative dong (행정동 行政洞), Samcheong-dong.

== See also ==
- Administrative divisions of South Korea
