= Anguk-dong =

Coordinates: 37.577°N 126.984°E

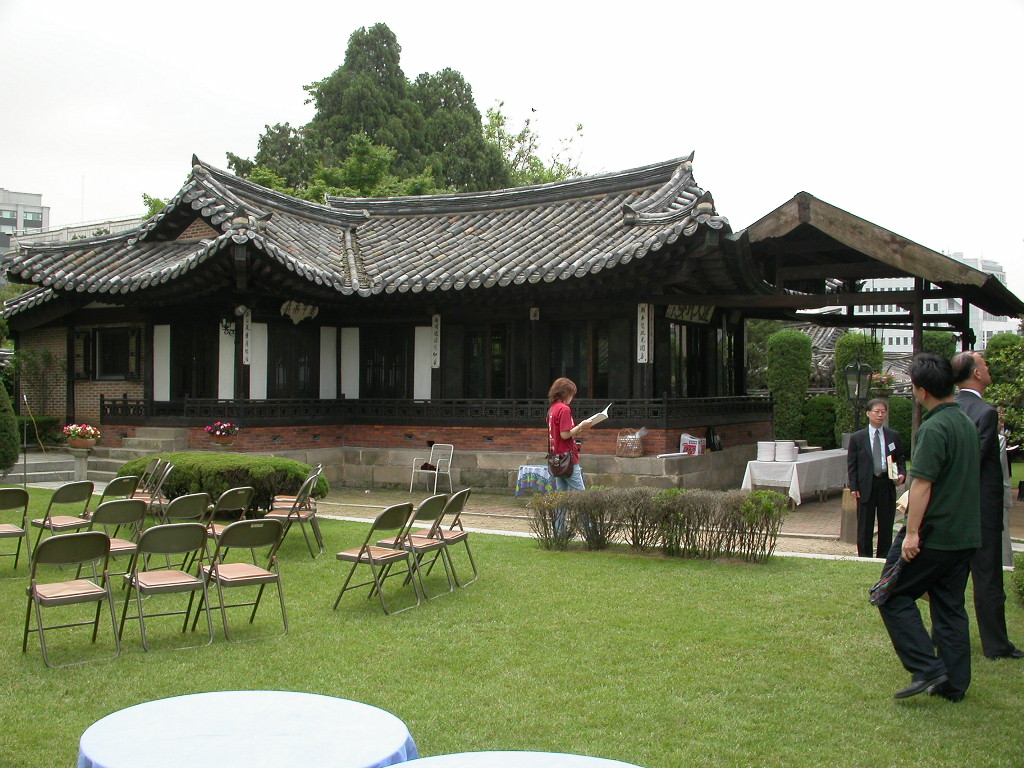
- Yun Posun lived in this building in Seoul, Anguk-dong
- Interactive map of Anguk-dong
- Country: South Korea

Area
  - Total: 0.07 km^{2} (0.027 sq mi)

Korean name
- Hangul: 안국동
- Hanja: 安國洞
- RR: Anguk-dong
- MR: An'guk-tong

Anguk-dong (Korean: 안국동) is a dong, neighbourhood of Jongno District, Seoul, South Korea. It is a legal dong (법정동) administered under its administrative dong (행정동), Samcheong-dong.

== See also ==
- Administrative divisions of South Korea
