= List of constituencies of the National Assembly of South Korea =

Electoral divisions in South Korea

South Korean National Assembly constituencies
- Constituencies as of the 2024 South Korean legislative election
- Category: Electoral district
- Location: South Korea
- Number: 300 (as of 2024)
- Populations: 111,554 (Gangseo, Busan) - 242,617 (Gwanak A)
- Government: National Assembly

The National Assembly of South Korea currently has 300 constituencies of which 254 are geographic constituencies that elect a single member using the plurality (first past the post) voting system to represent a geographic region, the remaining 46 members are elected using a semi-mixed member proportional representation system. Elections were last held for all 300 constituencies during the 2024 South Korean legislative election.

== Geographic constituencies ==
=== Seoul (48) ===
Constituency	Electorate (2024)	Subdivision (Administrative Districts)
Jongno	▼126,041	At large
Jung–Seongdong A	▼180,528	Wangsimni, Wangsimni-Doseon, Majang, Sageun, Hangdang, Eungbong, Seongsu, Songjeong, Yongdap
Jung–Seongdong B	▼177,422	Jung district at large, Geumho, Oksu
Yongsan	▼188,998	At large
Gwangjin A	▼150,187	Gunja, Junggok, Neung, Gwangjang, Guui 2nd
Gwangjin B	▼151,508	Hwayang, Jayang, Guui 1st, Guui 3rd
Dongdaemun A	▼151,861	Yongsin, Jegi, Cheongnyangni, Hoegi, Hwigyeong, Imun
Dongdaemun B	▼154,549	Jeonnong, Dapsimni, Jangan
Jungnang A	▼156,202	Myeonmok, Sangbong 2nd, Mangu 3rd
Jungnang B	▼188,139	Sangbong 1st, Junghwa, Muk, Mangu main, Sinnae
Seongbuk A	▼195,813	Seongbuk (dong), Samseon, Dongseon, Donam 2nd, Anam, Bomun, Jeongneung, Gireum 1st
Seongbuk B	▼178,667	Donam 1st, Gireum 2nd, Jongam, Wolgok, Jangwi, Seokgwan
Gangbuk A	▼132,265	Beon 1st, Beon 2nd, Suyu, Ui, Insu
Gangbuk B	▼128,295	Samyang, Mia, Songjung, Songcheon, samgaksan, Beon 3rd
Dobong A	▼136,836	Chang, Ssangmun 1st, Ssangmun 3rd
Dobong B	▼138,197	Dobong (dong), Ssangmun 2nd, Ssangmun 4th, Banghak
Nowon A	▲224,187	Wolgye, Gongneung, Hagye, Junggye Bon, Junggye 2nd, Junggye 3rd
Nowon B	▲211,043	Junggye 1st, Junggye 4th, Sanggye
Eunpyeong A	▲219,044	Nokbeon, Eungam, Yeokchon, Sinsa, Jeungsan, Susaek
Eunpyeong B	▼195,270	Bulgwang, Galhyeon, Gusan, Daejo, Jingwan
Seodaemun A	▼130,042	Chonyeon, Bugahyeon, Chunghyeon, Sinchon, Yeonhui, Hongje 1st, Hongje 2nd
Seodaemun B	▲141,489	Hongje 3rd, Hongeun, Namgajwa, Bukgajwa
Mapo A	▲157,500	Ahyeon, Gongdeok, Dohwa, Yongang, Daehung, Yeomni, Sinsu
Mapo B	▼182,761	Seogang, Seogyo, Hapjeong, Mangwon, Yeonnam, Seongsan, Sangam
Yangcheon A	▼195,448	Mok, Sinjeong 1st~2nd, Sinjeong 6th~7th
Yangcheon B	▼175,761	Sinwol, Sinjeong 3rd~4th
Gangseo A	▼168,119	Balsan, Ujangsan(Fmr. Hwagok 5th and Balsan 2nd), Hwagok 1st~3rd, Hwagok 8th
Gangseo B	▼171,060	Gayang 1st~2nd, Gonghang, Deungchon 3rd, Banghwa
Gangseo C	▼158,668	Gayang 3rd, Deungchon 1st~2nd, Yeomchang, Hwagok main, Hwagok 4th, Hwagok 6th
Guro A	▼205,069	Gocheok, Gaebong, Oryu, Sugung, Hang
Guro B	▼141,985	Sindorim, Guro (dong), Garibong
Geumcheon	▼207,518	At large
Yeongdeungpo A	▲193,458	Yeongdeunpo (dong), Dangsan, Dorim, Mullae, Yangpyeong, Singil 3rd
Yeongdeungpo B	▲141,494	Yeouido, Singil 1st, Singil 4th~7th, Daerim
Dongjak A	▼180,193	Noryangjin, Sangdo 2nd~4th, Daebang, Sindaebang
Dongjak B	▼158,571	Sangdo 1st, Heukseok, Sadang
Gwanak A	▼242,617	Bongcheon (Statutory dong, At-large), Namhyeon, Sillim (Administrative dong)
Gwanak B	▼204,556	Sillim (Statutory, Excpet Administrative Sillim-dong)
Seocho A	▼154,336	Jamwon, Banpo, Bangbae main, Bangbae 1st, Bangbae 4th
Seocho B	▲232,128	Seocho (dong), Bangbae 2nd~3rd, Yangje, Naegok
Gangnam A	▼156,085	Sinsa, Nonhyeon, Apgujeong, Cheongdam, Yeoksam
Gangnam B	▲168,269	Gaepo, Segok, Irwon, Suseo
Gangnam C	▼143,901	Samseong, Daechi, Dogok
Songpa A	▼151,559	Pungnap, Bangi, Oryun Songpa (dong), Jamsil 4th, Jamsil 6th
Songpa B	▼191,803	Seokchon, Samjeon, Garak 1st, Munjeong 2nd, Jamsil main, Jamsil 2nd~3rd, Jamsil 7th
Songpa C	▲220,953	Geoyeo, Macheon, Ogeum, Garak main, Garak 2nd, Munjeong 1st, Jangji, Wirye
Gangdong A	▼199,231	Gangil, Sangil, Myeongil, Godeok, Amsa
Gangdong B	▲198,766	Cheonho, Seongnae, Dunchon, Gil

=== Busan (18) ===
Constituency name	Electorate (2024)	Geographical Area
Jung–Yeongdo	▼132,866	All of Jung District, Busan and Yeongdo District
Seo–Dong	▼172,850	All of Seo District, Busan and Dong District, Busan
Busanjin A	▲160,658	Northern part of Busanjin District
Busanjin B	▲161,857	Southern part of Busanjin District
Dongnae	▼230,465	All of Dongnae District
Nam	223,869	All of Nam District, Busan
Buk A	121,889	Southern part of Buk District, Busan
Buk B	117,612	Northern part of Buk District, Busan
Haeundae A	▼185,494	Southern coastal part of Haeundae District
Haeundae B	▼141,382	Northern inland part of Haeundae District
Saha A	▲131,310	Northern part of Saha District
Saha B	▼130,588	Southern part of Saha District, Busan
Geumjeong	▼192,113	All of Geumjeong District, northern Busan
Gangseo	111,554	All of Gangseo District, western Busan
Yeonje	▲184,060	All of Yeonje District, central Busan
Suyeong	▼155,728	All of Suyeong District, central Busan
Sasang	▼181,823	All of Sasang District, central Busan
Gijang	▲146,425	All of Gijang County, north-eastern Busan

=== Daegu (12) ===
Constituency Name	Electorate (2024)	Geographical Area
Jung–Nam	▲204,639	All of Jung District and Nam District central and southern Daegu
Dong–Gunwi A	▲145,881	Southern part of Dong District eastern Daegu
Dong–Gunwi B	▲174,984	Northern part of Dong District and Gunwi County, eastern Daegu
Seo	▼149,953	All of Seo District, western Daegu
Buk A	▼152,872	Southern part of Buk District, northern Daegu
Buk B	▲208,180	Northern part of Buk District, northern Daegu
Suseong A	▼201,088	Northern part of Suseong District, eastern Daegu
Suseong B	▼143,624	Southern part of Suseong District, eastern Daegu
Dalseo A	▼134,682	Western part of Dalseo District, western Daegu
Dalseo B	▼195,189	Southern part of Dalseo District, western Daegu
Dalseo C	▼124,723	Eastern part of Dalseo District, western Daegu
Dalseong	▲214,642	All of Dalseong County, non continuous district in western and southern Daegu

=== Incheon (14) ===
Constituency Name	Electorate (2024)	Geographical Area
Jung–Ganghwa–Ongjin	▲211,775	Central Incheon, North west coast from Incheon Airport to the DMZ and Ongjin Islands
Dong–Michuhol A	▲225,741	All of Eastern District and northern part of Michuhol District Incheon
Dong–Michuhol B	▼185,368	Southern part of Michuhol District, Incheon
Yeonsu A	▲166,126	Eastern part of Yeonsu District, Incheon
Yeonsu B	▼156,982	Western part of Yeonsu District, Incheon
Namdong A	▼208,476	Southern part of Namdong District, Incheon
Namdong B	▼215,847	Northern part of Namdong District, Incheon
Bupyeong A	▼229,074	Southern part of Bupyeong District, Incheon
Bupyeong B	▲206,143	Northern part of Bupyeong District, Incheon
Gyeyang A	▲120,600	Southern part of Gyeyang District, Incheon
Gyeyang B	▼127,351	Northern part of Gyeyang District, Incheon
Seo A	▼174,282	Southern part of Western District, Incheon
Seo B	▼167,373	Central part of Western District, Incheon
Seo C	179,572	Northern part of Western District, Incheon

=== Gwangju (8) ===
Constituency Name	Electorate (2024)	Geographical Area
Dong–Nam A	▼136,736	Most of Southern District, Gwangju
Dong–Nam B	▲133,090	All of Eastern District and eastern part of southern district, Gwangju
Seo A	▼124,977	Northern part of Western District, Gwangju
Seo B	▼118,893	Southern part of Western District, Gwangju
Buk A	▲158,463	Eastern part of Northern District, Gwangju
Buk B	▼202,572	Western part of Northern District, Gwangju
Gwangsan A	▼138,064	Southern part of Gwangsan District
Gwangsan B	▲186,787	Northern Part of Gwangsan District

=== Daejeon (7) ===
Constituency name	Electorate (2024)	Geographical area
Dong	▼190,412	All of Eastern District, Daejeon
Jung	▼195,348	All of Central District, Daejeon
Seo A	▼212,533	Southern part of Western District, Daejeon
Seo B	▼183,839	Northern part of Western District, Daejeon
Yuseong A	▲159,614	Southern part of Yuseong District, Daejeon
Yuseong B	▲144,975	Northern part of Yuseong District, Daejeon
Daedeok	▼149,618	All of Daedeok District, northern Daejeon

=== Ulsan (6) ===
Constituency Name	Electorate (2024)	Geographical Area
Jung	▼179,055	All of Central District Ulsan
Nam A	▼139,853	Western part of Southern District, Ulsan
Nam B	▼123,722	Eastern part of Southern District, Ulsan
Dong	▼127,134	All of Eastern District, Ulsan
Buk	▲176,056	All of Northern District, Ulsan
Ulju	▲188,440	All of Ulju County, western Ulsan

=== Sejong City (2) ===
Constituency Name	Electorate (2024)	Geographical Area
Sejong A	▲171,472	Southern and Western part of Sejong City
Sejong B	▲129,759	Northern part of Sejong City

=== Gyeonggi (60) ===
Constituency Name	Electorate (2024)	Geographical Area
Suwon A	▲200,396	Northern Suwon
Suwon B	▲213,733	Western Suwon
Suwon C	▲182,482	Central Suwon
Suwon D	▼201,075	Eastern Suwon
Suwon E	▼227,030	Southern Suwon
Seongnam Sujeong	▲209,986	All of Sujeong District, northern Seongnam
Seongnam Jungwon	▼186,583	All of Jungwon District, eastern Seongnam
Seongnam Bundang A	▲214,158	Northern part of Bundang District, southern Seongnam
Seongnam Bundang B	▼182,451	Southern part of Bundag District, southern Seongnam
Uijeongbu A	▼177,927	Western part of Uijeongbu
Uijeongbu B	▲222,648	Eastern part of Uijeongbu
Anyang Manan	▼203,664	All of Manan District, Anyang
Anyang Dongan A	▼138,721	Northern part of Dongan District, north-eastern Anyang
Anyang Dongan B	▲129,800	Southern part of Dongan District, south-eastern Anyang
Bucheon A	▲232,632	Northern part of Bucheon City
Bucheon B	▼214,471	Western part of Bucheon City
Bucheon C	▲233,948	Southern part of Bucheon City
Gwangmyeong A	▼113,596	Northern part of Gwangmyeong
Gwangmyeong B	▼125,172	Southern part of Gwangmyeong
Pyeongtaek A	▼166,864	Northern part of Pyeongtaek
Pyeongtaek B	▼159,378	Western part of Pyeongtaek
Pyeongtaek C	171,693	Southern part of Pyeongtaek
Dongducheon–Yangju–Yeoncheon A	218,378	Yangju city (excluding Nam-myeon and Eunhyeon-myeon)
Dongducheon–Yangju–Yeoncheon B	125,278	All of Dongducheon, northern Yangju, all of Yeoncheon County
Ansan A	170,398	Southern Ansan
Ansan B	197,297	Eastern Ansan
Ansan C	181,427	Western Ansan
Goyang A	▲228,942	North-east Goyang
Goyang B	▲229,773	South-eastern Goyang
Goyang C	▲236,926	central Goyang
Goyang D	▼227,947	western Goyang
Uiwang–Gwacheon	▲202,961	Uiwang and Gwacheon cities- south of Seoul between Anyang and Seongnam
Guri	▼161,475	Guri city
Namyangju A	▲180,754	North-western Namyangju
Namyangju B	▲208,484	North-eastern Namyangju
Namyangju C	▲225,084	Southern Namyangju
Osan	▲193,088	Osan City south of Suwon
Siheung A	▲221,338	Northern Siheung
Siheung B	▲212,474	Southern Siheung
Gunpo	▼226,042	Gunpo north-west of Suwon
Hanam A	144,860	Northern Hanam
Hanam B	127,378	Southern Hanam
Yongin A	▲225,977	South East of Yongin city- all of Cheoin District
Yongin B	▲229,759	Northern Yongin city parts of Suji district
Yongin C	▼220,492	Western Yongin city, part of Suji District
Yongin D	▲223,886	Central Yongin City- parts of Giheung District and parts of Suji district
Paju A	▲226,611	South and West Paju next to North Korea
Paju B	▲192,812	North and East Paju next to North Korea
Icheon	▲188,859	Icheon city and surrounding area.
Anseong	▲165,008	Anseong city and surrounding area
Gimpo A	▲186,282	East Gimpo
Gimpo B	▲209,555	West Gimpo and surrounding area
Hwaseong A	▲221,628	Western Hwaseong and surrounding area
Hwaseong B	▼169,135	Southeastern Hwaseong
Hwaseong C	▼207,233	Central Hwaseong
Hwaseong D	164,120	Northeastern Hwaseong
Gwangju A	▲163,581	North of Gwangju, Gyeonggi
Gwangju B	▲170,215	South of Gwangju, Gyeonggi
Pocheon–Gapyeong	▼183,868	Pocheon and Gapyeong County in the north-east of Gyeonggi province
Yeoju–Yangpyeong	▲211,775	Yeoju City and Yangpyeong County in the south-east of Gyeonggi province

=== Gangwon (8) ===
Constituency Names	Electorate (2024)	Geographical Area
Chuncheon–Cheorwon–Hwacheon–Yanggu A	▲196,972	Southern Chuncheon City and surrounding rural area.
Chuncheon–Cheorwon–Hwacheon–Yanggu B	▼124,089	Northern Chuncheon City and Cheorwon County, Hwacheon County and Yanggu County in north western Gangwon
Wonju A	▲159,375	West Wonju city
Wonju B	▲148,344	East Wonju city
Gangneung	▼183,878	Gangneung City
Donghae–Taebaek–Samcheok–Jeongseon	▼196,849	Donghae City, Taebaek City, Samcheok City and Jeongseon County in south-east Gangwon province.
Sokcho–Goseong–Yangyang–Inje	▲148,964	Sokcho City, Inje County, Goseong County and Yangyang County in north-east Gangwon Province
Hongcheon–Hoengseong–Yeongwol–Pyeongchang	▼173,056	Hongcheon County, Hoengseong County, Yeongwol County and Pyeongchang County

=== North Chungcheong (8) ===
Constituency Name	Electorate (2024)	Geographical Area
Cheongju Sangdang	▲169,036	All of Sangdang District eastern Cheongju City
Cheongju Seowon	▼161,145	All of Seowon District southern Cheongju City
Cheongju Heungdeok	▲231,288	All of Heungdeok District western Cheongju City
Cheongju Cheongwon	▲158,647	All of Cheongwon District northern Cheongju City
Chungju	▲181,005	Chungju City
Jecheon–Danyang	▼139,768	Jecheon City and Danyang County
Boeun–Okcheon–Yeongdong–Goesan	▼146,169	Boeun County, Okcheon County, Yeongdong County and Goesan County
Jeungpyeong–Jincheon–Eumseong	▲185,137	Jeungpyeong County, Jincheon County and Eumseong County

=== South Chungcheong (11) ===
Constituency Name	Electorate (2024)	Geographical Area
Cheonan A	▲216,611	Parts of Dongnam District eastern Cheonan
Cheonan B	▼182,191	Parts of Seobuk District northern and western Cheonan
Cheonan C	▲154,083	Parts and Dongnam and Seobuk District southern Cheonan
Gongju–Buyeo–Cheongyang	▼174,418	Gongju City, Buyeo County and Cheongyang County
Boryeong–Seocheon	▼128,959	Boryeong City and Seocheon County
Asan A	▼125,706	Western Asan
Asan B	▲160,464	Eastern Asan and surrounding areas
Seosan–Taean	▲204,098	Seosan City and Taean County
Nonsan–Gyeryong–Geumsan	▼180,091	Nonsan City, Gyeryong City and Geumsan County
Dangjin	▲143,594	Dangjin City
Hongseong–Yesan	▼154,563	Hongseong County and Yesan County

=== North Jeolla (10) ===
Constituency name	Electorate (2024)	Geographical Area
Jeonju A	▲163,995	parts of Wansan District south-east Jeonju
Jeonju B	▲166,404	parts of Wansan District south-west Jeonju
Jeonju C	▼212,820	all of Deokjin District north Jeonju
Gunsan–Gimje–Buan A	214,985	Gunsan city (excluding Daeya-myeon and Hoehyeon-myeon)
Gunsan–Gimje–Buan B	124,423	parts of Gunsan, all of Gimje and Buan County
Iksan A	▼117,493	western Iksan city
Iksan B	▼116,493	eastern Iksan city
Jeongeup–Gochang	▼137,963	Jeongeup City and Gochang County
Namwon–Jangsu–Imsil–Sunchang	133,870	Namwon City, Jangsu County, Imsil County and Sunchang County
Wanju–Jinan–Muju	128,570	Wanju County, Jinan County, and Muju County

=== South Jeolla (10) ===
Constituency Name	Electorate (2024)	Geographical area
Mokpo	▼181,418	Mokpo City
Yeosu A	▲120,250	Eastern Yeosu City
Yeosu B	▼114,061	Western Yeosu City
Suncheon–Gwangyang–Gokseong–Gurye A	▼191,614	Almost all of Suncheon City
Suncheon–Gwangyang–Gokseong–Gurye B	▲218,521	Part of Suncheon City, all of Gwangyang City, Gokseong County and Gurye County
Naju–Hwasun	▲154,071	Naju City and Hwasun County
Damyang–Hampyeong–Yeonggwang–Jangseong	▼151,967	Damyang County, Hampyeong County, Yeonggwang County and Jangseong County northern Jeonnam
Goheung–Boseong–Jangheung–Gangjin	▼151,441	Goheung County, Boseong County, Jangheung County and Gangjin County southern Jeonam
Haenam–Wando–Jindo	▼124,718	Haenam County, Wando County and Jindo County south western Jeonam
Yeongam–Muan–Sinan	▲156,151	Yeongam County, Muan County and Sinan County

=== North Gyeongsang (13) ===
Constituency name	Electorate (2024)	Geographical Area
Pohang Buk	▼228,023	All of North District, Pohang
Pohang Nam–Ulleung	▼203,445	All of South District, Pohang and Ulleung County
Gyeongju	▼217,609	All of Gyeongju south-east Gyeongbuk
Gimcheon	▼118,478	All of Gimcheon western Gyeongbuk
Andong–Yecheon	▼181,285	All of Andong city and Yecheon County
Gumi A	▼173,050	Southern Gumi
Gumi B	▲164,338	Northern Gumi and surrounding area
Yeongju–Yeongyang–Bonghwa	129,648	Yeongju City, Yeongyang County, and Bonghwa County
Yeongcheon–Cheongdo	▼128,322	Yeongcheon City and Cheongdo County
Sangju–Mungyeong	▼144,308	Sangju City and Mungyeong City in north-western Gyeongbuk
Gyeongsan	▲231,226	Gyeongsan City east of Daegu.
Uiseong–Cheongsong–Yeongdeok–Uljin	141,262	Uiseong County, Cheongsong County, Yeongdeok County, and Uljin County in central Gyeongbuk
Goryeong–Seongju–Chilgok	▼160,408	Goryeong County, Seongju County and Chilgok County west of Daegu

=== South Gyeongsang (16) ===
Constituency Name	Electorate (2024)	Geographical Area
Changwon Uichang	▼182,326	Uichang District northern Changwon City
Changwon Seongsan	▲208,594	Seongsan District central Changwon City
Changwon Masanhappo	▲155,430	Masanhappo District, south-west Changwon City
Changwon Masanhoewon	▼156,812	Masanhoewon District, west Changwon City
Changwon Jinhae	▲158,141	Jinhae District, south Changwon City
Jinju A	▲167,725	Western Jinju City
Jinju B	▼121,959	Eastern Jinju City
Tongyeong–Goseong	▼147,305	Tongyeong City and Goseong County southern Gyeongnam
Sacheon–Namhae–Hadong	▼169,430	Sacheon City, Namhae County and Hadong County southern Gyeongnam
Gimhae A	▲222,271	Northern Gimhae city
Gimhae B	▲223,355	Southern Gimhae City
Miryang–Uiryeong–Haman–Changnyeong	▼218,917	Milyang City, Uiryeong County, Haman County and Changnyeong County
Geoje	▼191,224	Geoje Island off the south coast of Gyeongnam
Yangsan A	▼151,262	Western part of Yangsan City, north of Busan
Yangsan B	▲146,338	Eastern part of Yangsan City, north of Busan
Sancheong–Hamyang–Geochang–Hapcheon	▼154,837	Sancheong County, Hamyang County, Geochang County and Hapcheon County western Gyeongbuk

=== Jeju Island (3) ===
Constituency Name	Electorate (2024)	Geographical Area
Jeju A	▲213,825	west Jeju City, north-west Jeju Island
Jeju B	▲194,949	east Jeju City, north-east Jeju Island
Seogwipo	▲155,750	Seogwipo City, southern Jeju Island
