= Gangbuk B =

Constituency in Seoul, South Korea

- Single-member constituency for the National Assembly
- Location of the constituency
- District(s): Gangbuk District (part)
- Region: Seoul
- Electorate: 128,295 (2024)

Current constituency
- Created: 1996
- Seats: 1
- Party: Democratic Party
- Member: Han Min-su
- Created from: Dobong B, Dobong C

Gangbuk B (Korean: 강북구 을) is a constituency of the National Assembly of South Korea. The constituency consists of parts of Gangbuk District, Seoul. As of 2024, 128,295 eligible voters were registered in the constituency. The constituency was created in 1996 after being reorganized from the Dobong B and Dobong C constituency.

== History ==
Since its establishment, Gangbuk B has always voted for members of centre-left, liberal parties to represent the constituency and is thus considered a stronghold for the Democratic Party. Cho Soon-hyung of the centrist-liberal National Congress for New Politics was the first member to represent the constituency. Cho was re-elected as a member of the liberal Millennium Democratic Party in 2000. He was succeeded by Choi Kyu-sik liberal Uri Party. Choi won re-election in the following election, securing 43.5% of the vote. Choi did not stand for re-election after he was found guilty of receiving political funds illegally. The Democratic United Party nominated Yoo Dae-woon for the constituency in the 2012 election, who went on to win the general election. Park Yong-jin was nominated as the Democratic Party's nominee for Gangbuk B in the 2016 election after defeating Yoo Dae-woon in the party's primary. Park won the general election with 51.08% of the vote. Park won re-election in 2020, widening his margin of victory by receiving 64.45% of the vote.

Ahead of the 2024 South Korean legislative election, incumbent Park Yong-jin was informed by the Democratic Party leadership that his performance in the National Assembly was evaluated as "among the bottom 10 percent" by the party. Park had been considered a member of the party's anti-Lee Jae-myung faction and the evaluation caused speculation that Park would be "cut off" from being re-nominated as the party's candidate for Gangbuk B. The Democratic Party's primary held days later saw pro-Lee Jae-myung candidate Chung Bong-ju defeat incumbent Park Yong-jin to win the party's nomination for the constituency. However Chung's nomination was cancelled after it was discovered that he had made disparaging comments about injured South Korean soldiers who had been victims of North Korean land mines in the DMZ. As a result of the nomination's cancellation, the Democratic Party held another primary between pro-Lee Jae-myung candidate Cho Su-jin and anti-Lee Jae-myung incumbent Park Yong-jin. Cho Su-jin won in a landslide against Park, receiving 69.93 of the raw vote and 80.6% of the adjusted vote. However Cho resigned as the party's nominee on March 22 after it was discovered that she had defended a sex offender that allegedly sexually assaulted a minor. The party nominated spokesperson Han Min-su on March 22 without another primary. Han Min-su won in the general election with 52.94% of the vote.

== Boundaries ==
The constituency encompasses the neighborhoods of Beon 3-dong, Mia-dong, Samyang-dong, Songjung-dong, Songcheon-dong, and Samgaksan-dong.

== List of members of the National Assembly ==
Election	Member	Party	Dates	Notes
1996	Cho Soon-hyung	National Congress	1996–2004	Secretary General of the National Congress (1995–1996)
2000	Cho Soon-hyung	Millennium Democratic	1996–2004	Secretary General of the National Congress (1995–1996)
2004	Choi Kyu-sik	Uri	2004–2012	Ambassador to Hungary (2018–2020)
2008	Choi Kyu-sik	United Democratic	2004–2012	Ambassador to Hungary (2018–2020)
2012	Yoo Dae-woon	Democratic United	2012–2016	
2016	Park Yong-jin	Democratic	2016–2024	Co-Deputy Chairman of the Regulatory Reform Committee (2026–)
2020	Park Yong-jin	Democratic	2016–2024	Co-Deputy Chairman of the Regulatory Reform Committee (2026–)
2024	Han Min-su	Democratic	2024–present	

== Election results ==
=== 2024 ===
Legislative Election 2024: Gangbuk B
Party	Candidate	Votes	%	±%
Democratic	Han Min-su	44,623	52.94	▼11.51
People Power	Park Jin-woong	34,989	41.51	▲6.8
New Future	Lee Seok-hyun	4,672	5.54	new
Rejected ballots		1,303	–	
Turnout		84,284	65.69	▲0.5
Registered electors		128,295		
Democratic hold		Swing		

=== 2020 ===
Legislative Election 2020: Gangbuk B
Party	Candidate	Votes	%	±%
Democratic	Park Yong-jin	57,013	64.45	▲13.37
United Future	Ahn Hong-ryul	30,708	34.71	▼0.47
National Revolutionary	Jwa Tae-hong	737	0.83	new
Rejected ballots		1,181	–	
Turnout		89,639	65.19	▲8.52
Registered electors		137,495		
Democratic hold		Swing		

=== 2016 ===
Legislative Election 2016: Gangbuk B
Party	Candidate	Votes	%	±%
Democratic	Park Yong-jin	40,373	51.08	▼3.11
Saenuri	Ahn Hong-ryul	30,098	35.18	▼7.38
People	Cho Koo-sung	10,849	13.72	new
Rejected ballots		1,064	–	
Turnout		80,095	56.67	▲4.82
Registered electors		141,334		
Democratic hold		Swing		

=== 2012 ===
Legislative Election 2012: Gangbuk B
Party	Candidate	Votes	%	±%
Democratic United	Yoo Dae-woon	40,755	54.19	▲10.69
Saenuri	Ahn Hong-ryul	32,009	42.56	▲4.73
Korea Vision	Hong Sung-nam	2,441	3.24	new
Rejected ballots		671	–	
Turnout		75,876	51.85	▲8.2
Registered electors		146,336		
Democratic United hold		Swing		

=== 2008 ===
Legislative Election 2008: Gangbuk B
Party	Candidate	Votes	%	±%
United Democratic	Choi Kyu-sik	26,391	43.50	new
Grand National	Lee Soo-hee	22,949	37.83	▲5.19
New Progressive	Park Yong-jin	7,088	11.68	new
Democratic Labor	Kim Hye-shin	1,741	2.86	▼5.40
Liberty Forward	Lim Kang-sin	2,096	3.45	new
Family Party for Peace and Unity	Cho Han-bok	398	0.65	new
Rejected ballots		444	–	
Turnout		61,107	43.65	▼16.26
Registered electors		139,997		
United Democratic hold		Swing		

=== 2004 ===
Legislative Election 2004: Gangbuk B
Party	Candidate	Votes	%	±%
Uri	Choi Kyu-sik	36,206	42.46	new
Grand National	Ahn Hong-ryul	27,838	32.64	▲6.32
Millennium Democratic	Kim Gyung-jae	13,403	15.71	▼30.74
Democratic Labor	Ahn Gil-soo	7,046	8.26	▼5.0
United Liberal Democrats	Ahn Jong-mo	771	0.90	▼3.02
Rejected ballots		726	–	
Turnout		85,990	59.91	▲9.73
Registered electors		143,522		
Uri gain from Millennium Democratic		Swing		

=== 2000 ===
Legislative Election 2000: Gangbuk B
Party	Candidate	Votes	%	±%
Millennium Democratic	Cho Soon-hyung	29,351	46.45	new
Grand National	Jeon Dae-yeol	16,636	26.32	new
Democratic Labor	Park Yong-jin	8,381	13.26	new
Independent	Kim Tae-hwan	4,716	7.46	new
United Liberal Democrats	Ko Byung-ryeol	2,480	3.92	▼11.01
Democratic People's	Lee Byung-seok	929	1.47	new
Youth Progressive	Chang Myung-chul	695	1.09	new
Rejected ballots		674	–	
Turnout		63,862	50.18	▼6.55
Registered electors		127,261		
Millennium Democratic hold		Swing		

=== 1996 ===
Legislative Election 1996: Gangbuk B
Party	Candidate	Votes	%	±%
National Congress	Cho Soon-hyung	36,405	45.28	–
New Korea	Lee Chul-yong	22,923	28.51	–
United Liberal Democrats	Kim Tae-hwan	12,006	14.93	–
Democratic	Lee Ki-taek	7,066	8.78	–
Independent	Cho Ku-sung	1,344	1.67	–
Independent	Ko Chung-seok	649	0.80	–
Rejected ballots		1,401	–	
Turnout		81,794	56.73	–
Registered electors		144,185		
National Congress win (new seat)				

== See also ==
- List of constituencies of the National Assembly of South Korea
