= Miasageori station =

Train station in Seoul, South Korea

미아사거리; Miasageori
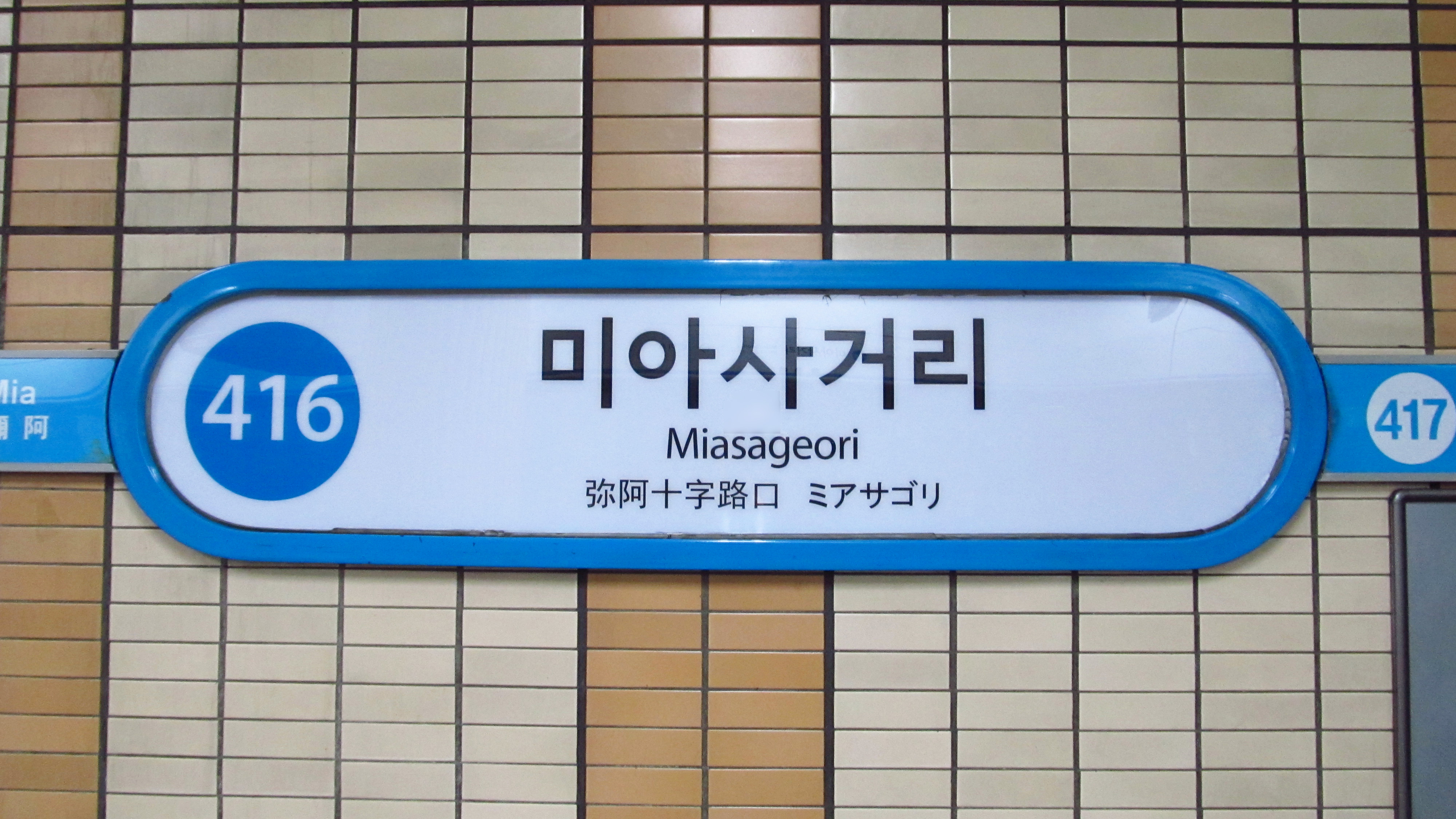

Korean name
- Hangul: 미아사거리역
- Hanja: 彌阿四거리驛
- Revised Romanization: Miasageori-yeok
- McCune–Reischauer: Miasagŏri-yŏk

General information
- Location: 50 Dobong-ro, 66-1 Mia-dong, Gangbuk-gu, Seoul
- Coordinates: 37°36′48″N 127°01′48″E
- Operator: Seoul Metro
- Line: Line 4
- Platforms: 2
- Tracks: 2

Construction
- Structure type: Underground

History
- Opened: April 20, 1985
- Former names: Miasamgeori

Passengers
- (Daily) Based on Jan-Dec of 2012. Line 4: 73,203

Services
Preceding station	Seoul Metropolitan Subway	Following station
Mia towards Jinjeop	Line 4	Gireum towards Oido
Location

Miasageori Station is a station on the Seoul Subway Line 4. Its name means "four-way junction in Mia-dong." It is located in Mia-dong, Gangbuk-gu, Seoul. It was previously called Miasamgeori (미아삼거리), until December 26, 2013.

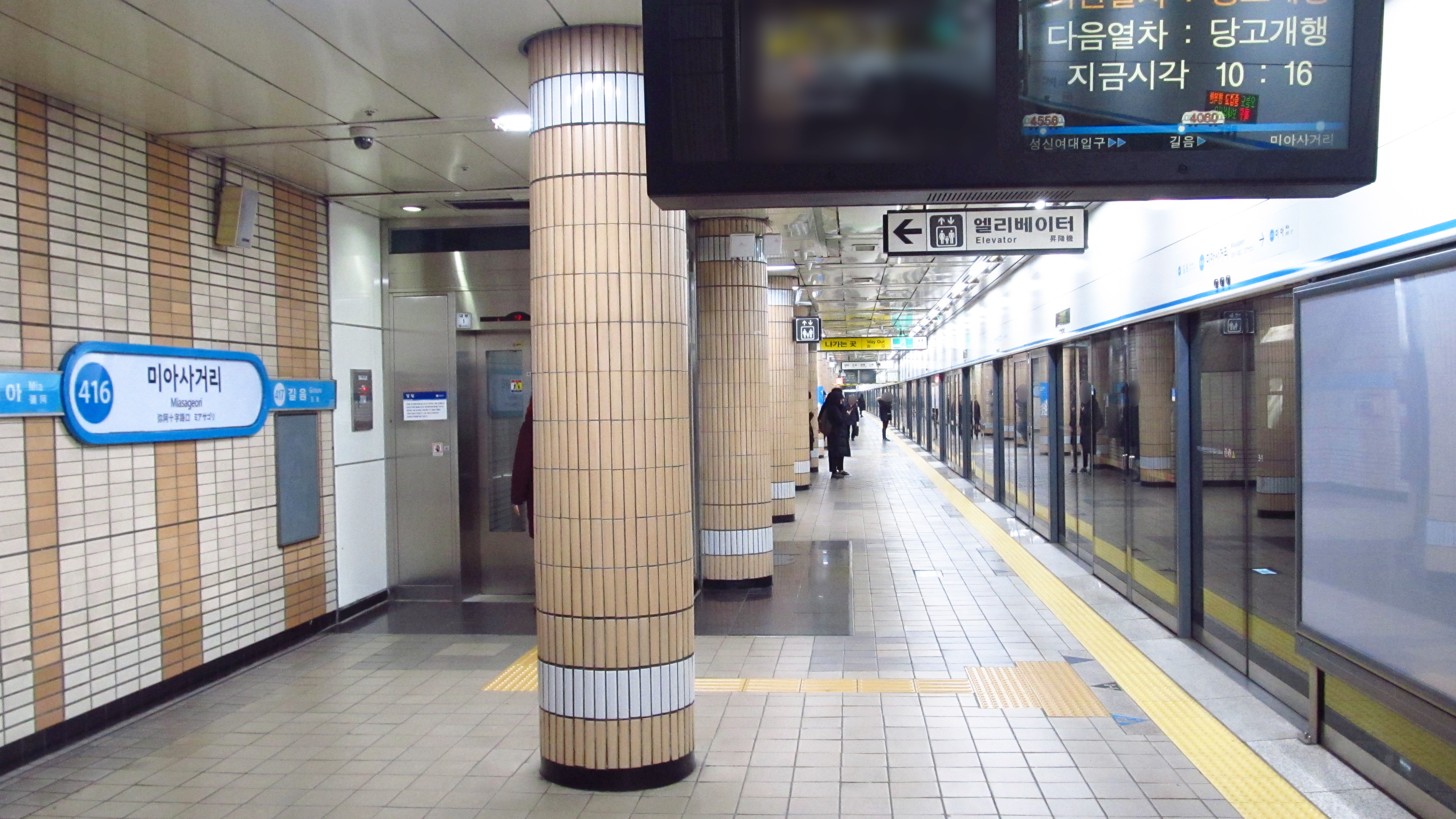

== Station layout ==
G	Street level	Exit

L1; Concourse	Lobby	Customer Service, Shops, Vending machines, ATMs

L2; Platforms	Side platform, doors will open on the right
L2; Platforms	Northbound	← Line 4 toward Jinjeop (Mia)
L2; Platforms	Southbound	Line 4 toward Oido (Gireum) →
L2; Platforms	Side platform, doors will open on the right
