= Mia station =

Train station in Seoul, South Korea

| 미아 (서울사이버대학); Mia (Seoul Cyber Univ.) |
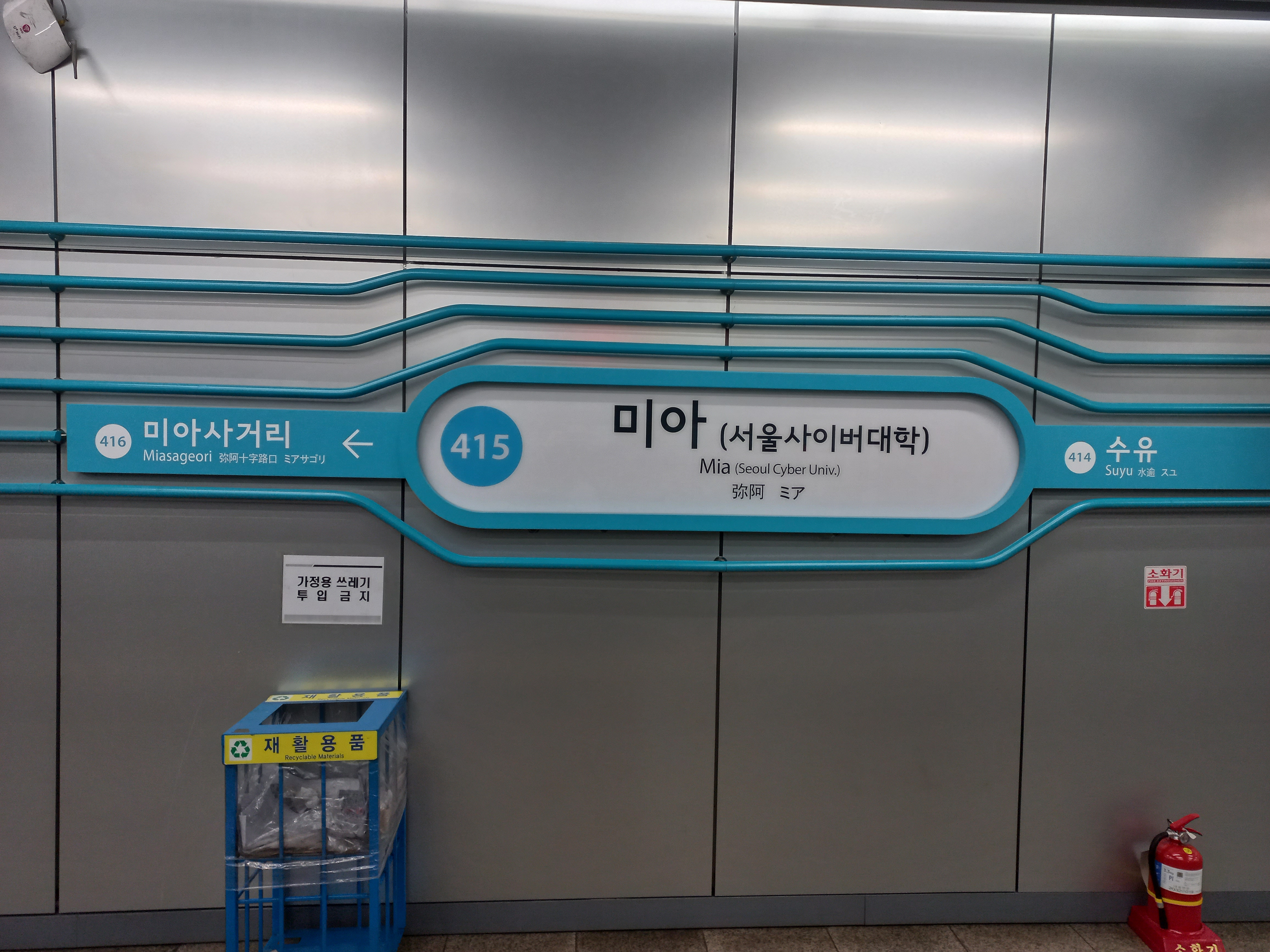

Korean name
- Hangul: 미아역
- Hanja: 彌阿驛
- Revised Romanization: Mia-yeok
- McCune–Reischauer: Mia-yŏk

General information
- Location: 197-14 Mia-dong, 198 Dobongno, Gangbuk-gu, Seoul
- Coordinates: 37°37′36″N 127°01′34″E
- Operator: Seoul Metro
- Line: Line 4
- Platforms: 2
- Tracks: 2

Construction
- Structure type: Underground

History
- Opened: April 20, 1985

Passengers
- (Daily) Based on Jan-Dec of 2012. Line 4: 37,811

Services
| Preceding station | Seoul Metropolitan Subway | Following station |
|---|---|---|
| Suyu towards Jinjeop | Line 4 | Miasageori towards Oido |
Location

Mia Station is an underground station on the Seoul Subway Line 4. It is located in Mia-dong, Gangbuk-gu, Seoul, South Korea. Its station subname is Seoul Cyber Univ., where the said university is nearby.

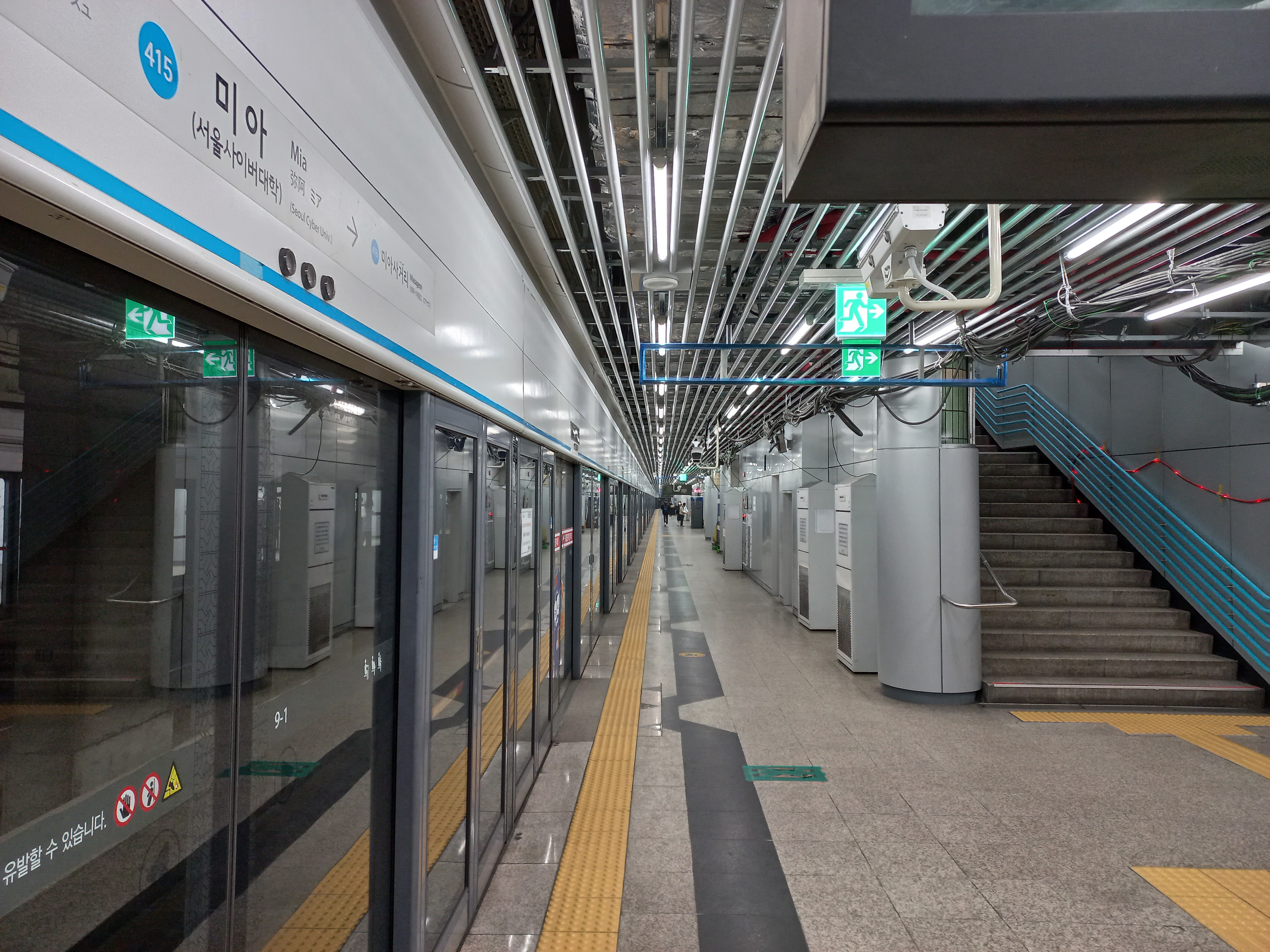

== Station layout ==
| G | Street level | Exit |

| L1; Concourse | Lobby | Customer Service, Shops, Vending machines, ATMs |

| L2; Platforms | Side platform, doors will open on the right |
| L2; Platforms | Northbound | ← Line 4 toward Jinjeop (Suyu) |
| L2; Platforms | Southbound | Line 4 toward Oido (Miasageori) → |
| L2; Platforms | Side platform, doors will open on the right |

== Surrounding area ==
- Seoul Cyber University
