= Samyang =

- Hangul: 삼양
- RR: Samyang
- MR: Samyang
- IPA: [sʰamjaŋ]

Samyang can refer to:

- Samyang-dong, a neighborhood in Seoul
- Samyang Food, a food manufacturer
- Samyang Optics, a South Korean manufacturer of camera equipment and electronics
- Kumho Tires, a company previously named Samyang Tire
