= Seoul Cyber University =

Coordinates: 37.6298°N 127.0271°E

- 서울사이버대학교
- Motto: Freemen with Christian Belief
- Type: Private
- Established: 2000
- President: Lee Eun-joo
- Academic staff: 180
- Students: 11000
- Location: Seoul, South Korea
- Website: www.iscu.ac.kr

Seoul Cyber University (SCU) (Korean: 서울사이버대학교) is a Korean online university. SCU is located in Seoul, South Korea, where it has approximately 11,000 enrolled students and 100 faculty members among 9 schools. It has 19 departments. It was selected as Korea's 'Best Cyber University' by the Ministry of Education, Science, and Technology in 2007 and acknowledged as a comprehensive university in 2008, according to the 'Higher Education Act'.

Seoul Cyber University was established by the Law of Lifelong Education, accredited by Ministry of Education, Science and Technology (MEST) in November 2000.

The online university's headquarters is located in Mia-dong, Gangbuk-gu, Seoul, which is within the vicinity of Mia station on Seoul Subway Line 4.

The regional campuses are located in Incheon Metropolitan City Bupyeong-gu and Busan Metropolitan City Yeongdo, Daegu, Jung-gu, Gwangju, Seongnam, Gyeonggi, Anyang, Gangwon.

== History ==
- November 2000: Accredited by the Ministry of Education, Science and Technology Development
- June 2003 Acknowledged as educational contents of the highest quality by the MEST
- July 2007 Recognized as the best online university in Korea by the MEST
- October 2009 Awarded Grand Prize from Hankuk University Newspaper as having best educational contents
- May 2011 Won 2nd place of the IMS Learning Impact Award
- November 2011 Acquired a patent of SCU Learning Wave

== See also ==
- Distance education
