= Asean cyber university project =

South Korean educational initiative

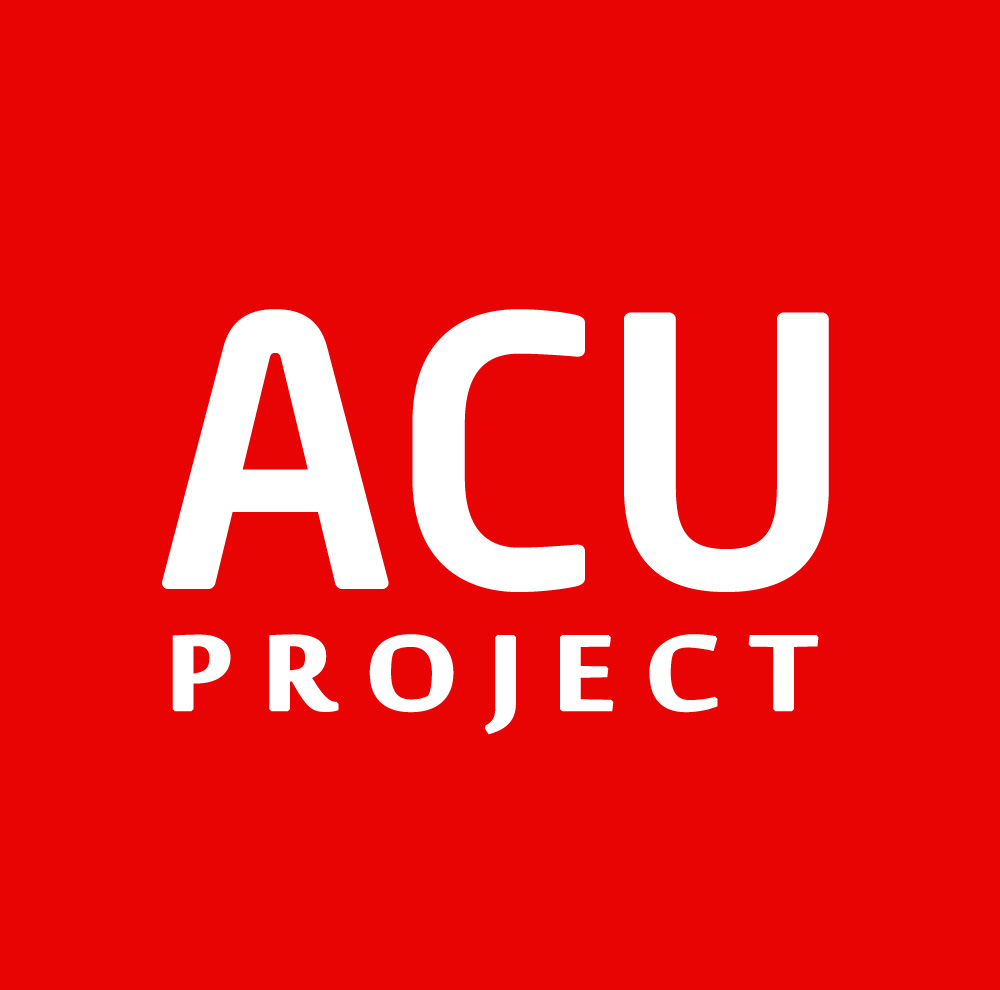
ASEAN Cyber University Project
Title	ASEAN Cyber University Establishment Project
Period	2012–present
Type	International educational Project
Member States	Cambodia, Laos, Myanmar, Vietnam, Thailand
Member Institutes	Institute of Technology of Cambodia , National University of Laos, University of Technology of Myanmar, Hanoi University of Science and Technology, and Sripatum University
Implementing Institute	Seoul Cyber University
Location of ACU Secretariat	South Korea, Seoul
Homepage	http://www.aseancu.org

ASEAN Cyber University (ACU) Project is an international project which was initiated by Ministry of Education of Republic of Korea (ROK). The main purpose of this Project is to contribute to reinforcing higher education in ASEAN region by the means of e-learning, and strengthening international relationships between ROK and ASEAN Member States. As of 2013, five Member States, four Member Institutes, and one Institution have joined the ACU membership.

== History ==
When a series of ASEAN-ROK Summits were held in 2009, Dr. Surin Pitsuwan, Secretary-General of ASEAN suggested ROK to establish a global cyber university to advance international human resource exchange and the overall educational programs in the ASEAN region. Propelled by this comment, Korean government undertook establishing an international online university. As a follow-up step, ROK officials were invited to the ASEAN Senior Officials Meeting on Education (SOM-ED) in November 2009 to brief the proposed ASEAN-ROK Cyber University. After SOM-ED in 2011, the ASEAN Secretariat, Cambodia, Laos, Myanmar, Vietnam and ASEAN University Network (AUN) shared the “Master Plan for ASEAN Cyber University” and the Project began in earnest. Seoul Cyber University was nominated as an implementing partner of the Project by the Ministry of Education of ROK, for being acknowledged its know-how and experience in online education. ACU Project Task force was launched in 2012 and it has changed to ACU Secretariat located in Seoul Cyber University in 2013.

In March 2012, the 1st Meeting of ACU Project Steering Committee was held in Hanoi, Vietnam with representatives from Initial Members, Cambodia, Laos, Myanmar, Vietnam, AUN, and ROK in order to discuss and resolve agendum for the promotion of ACU Project. The Initial Members attended the MOU signing ceremony and promised to commit to the formalization of ACU Project. Thailand has joined ACU membership in 2013, and ACU Project is expected to expand its membership to 10 ASEAN Member States.

== Structure ==
Ministry of Education (MOE) of ROK and ACU Secretariat are taking the lead of this Project. ACU Secretariat organizes meetings of ACU Project Steering Committee which are held twice a year to discuss and decide key issues of ACU Project with members of Steering Committee attending. Representative from MOE chairs a meeting and Director General of ACU Secretariat serves as a secretary. Hub Center, located in Hanoi University of Science and Technology, Vietnam, is a head office where administrators and managers can control local e-learning centers and manage ACU Learning Management System (LMS) to activate the Credit Exchange Program among ACU Member Institutes. It also monitors contents operation and examines system and networks. Each Member Institute has its own e-learning center which can manage ACU online courses via ACU or local LMS.

== Member States and Institutes ==
- Cambodia: The Ministry of Education, Youth and Sport , Institute of Technology of Cambodia
- Laos: The Ministry of Education and Sports , National University of Laos
- Myanmar: The Ministry of Education , University of Technology-Yatanarpon Cyber City of Myanmar
- Vietnam: The Ministry of Education and Training , Hanoi University of Science and Technology
- Thailand: Office of the Higher Education Commission , Sripatum University

== Gallery ==
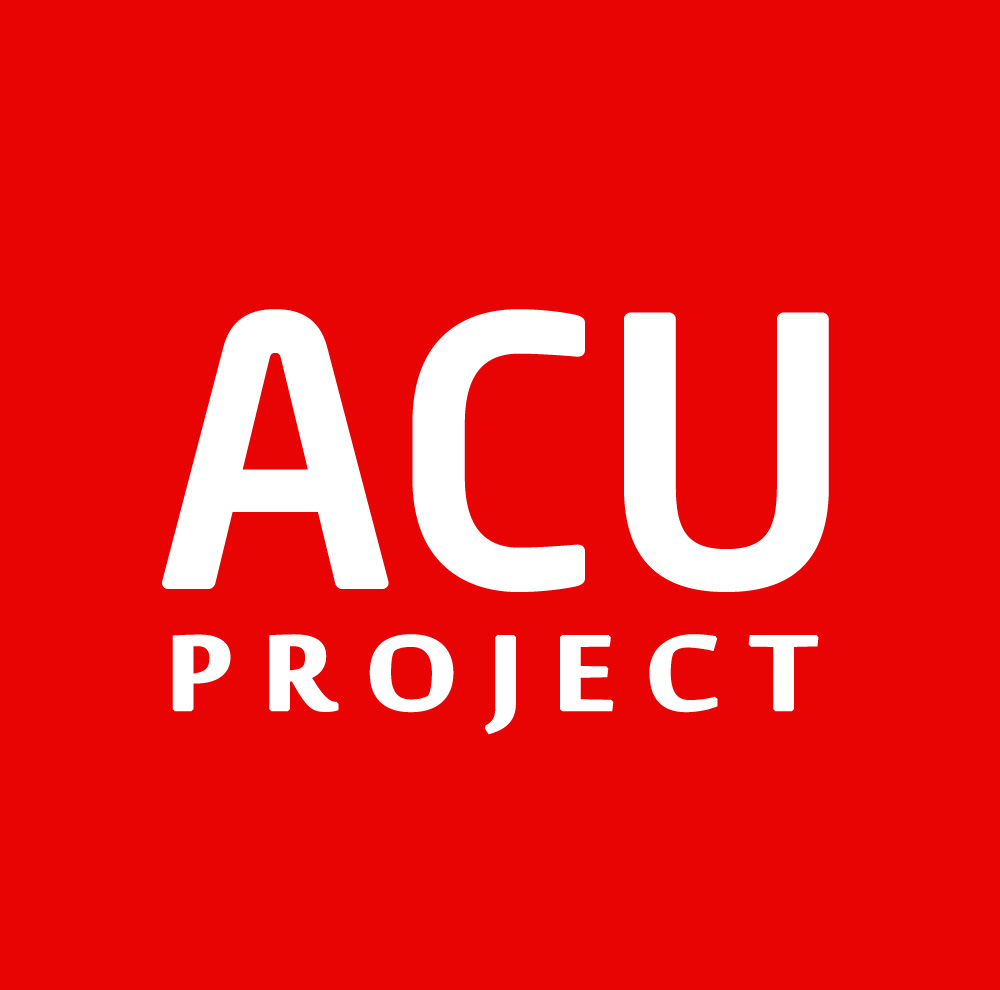
Logo

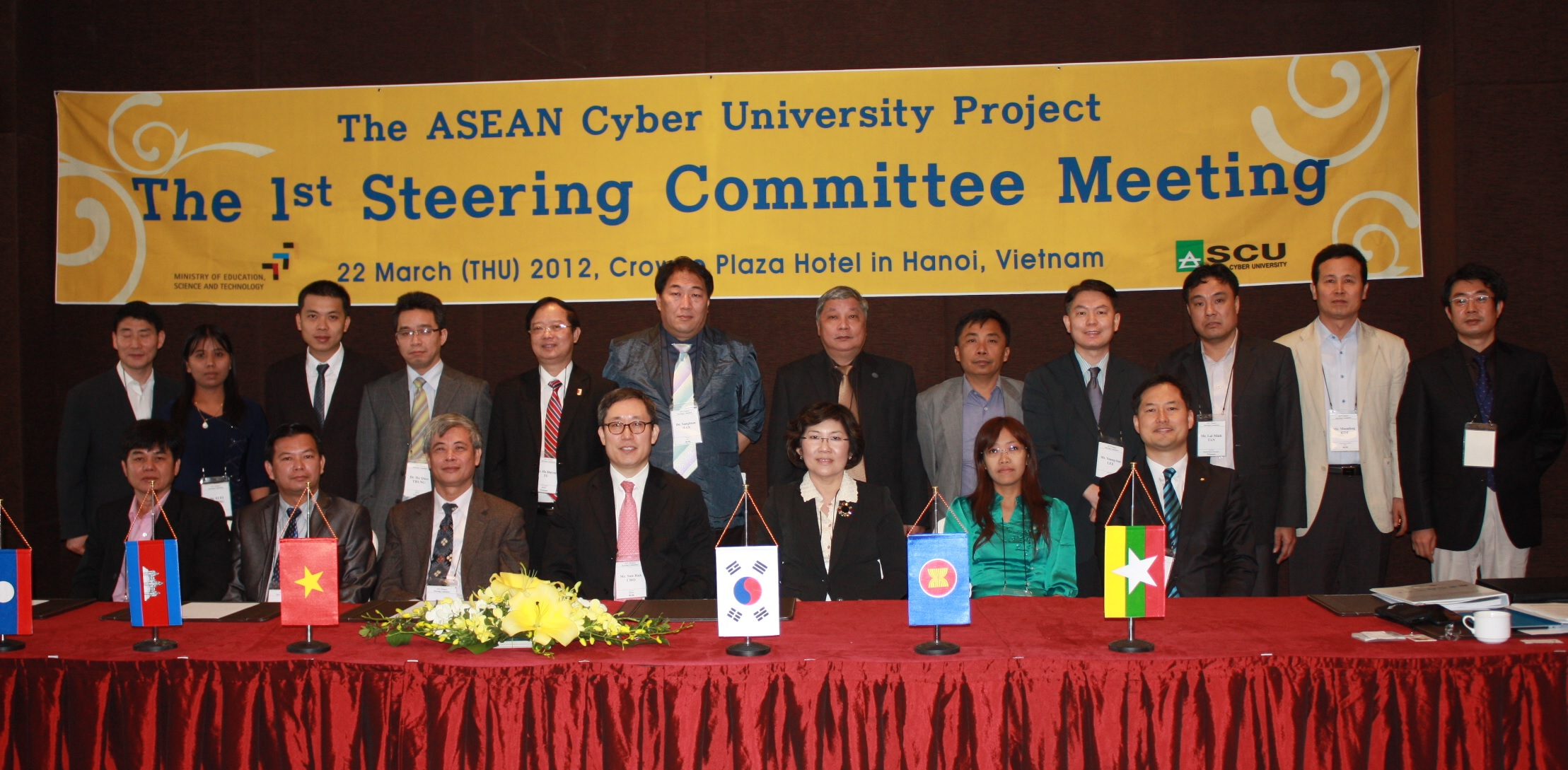
1st Meeting of ACU Project Steering Committee

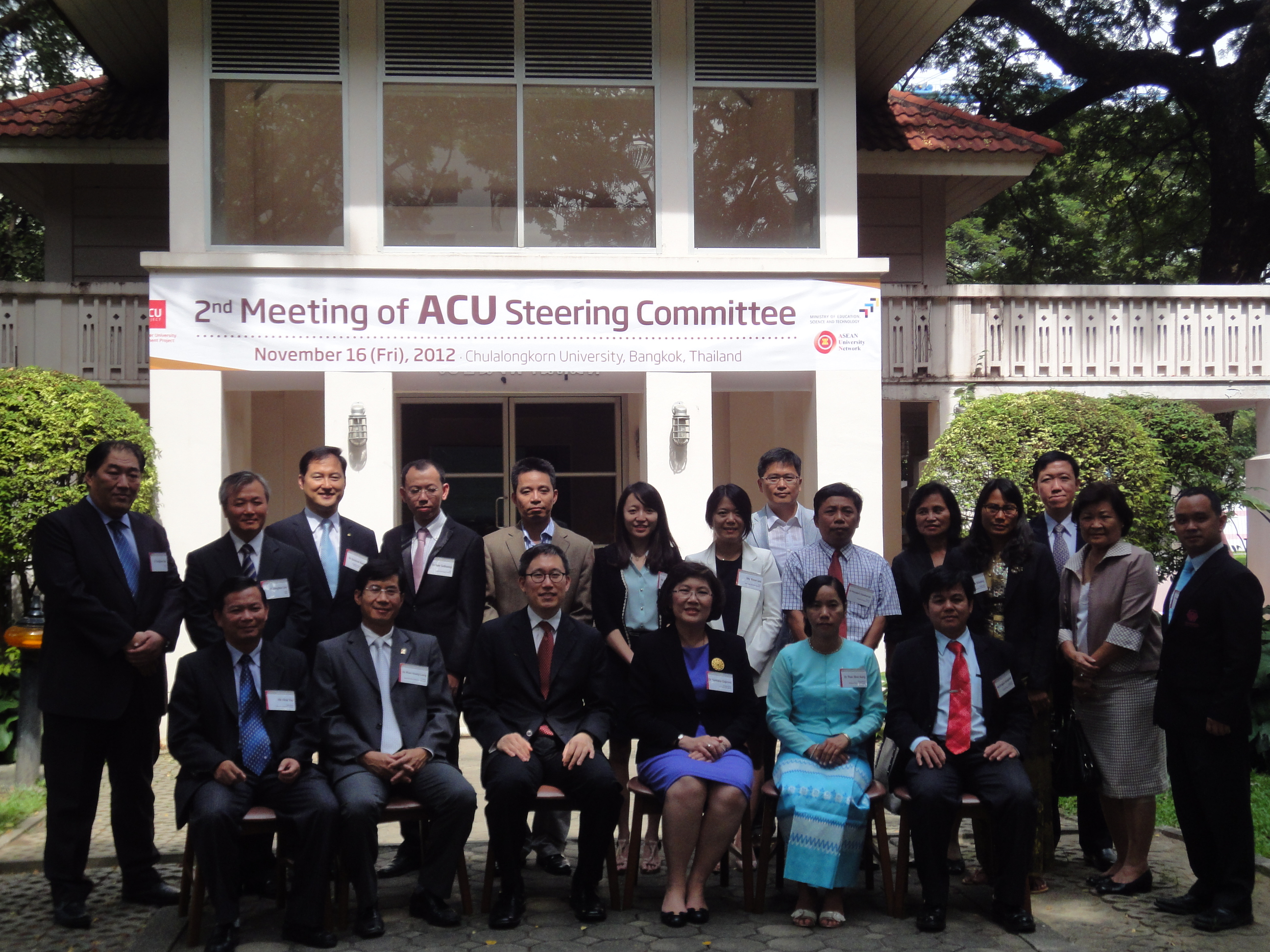
2nd Meeting of ACU Project Steering Committee

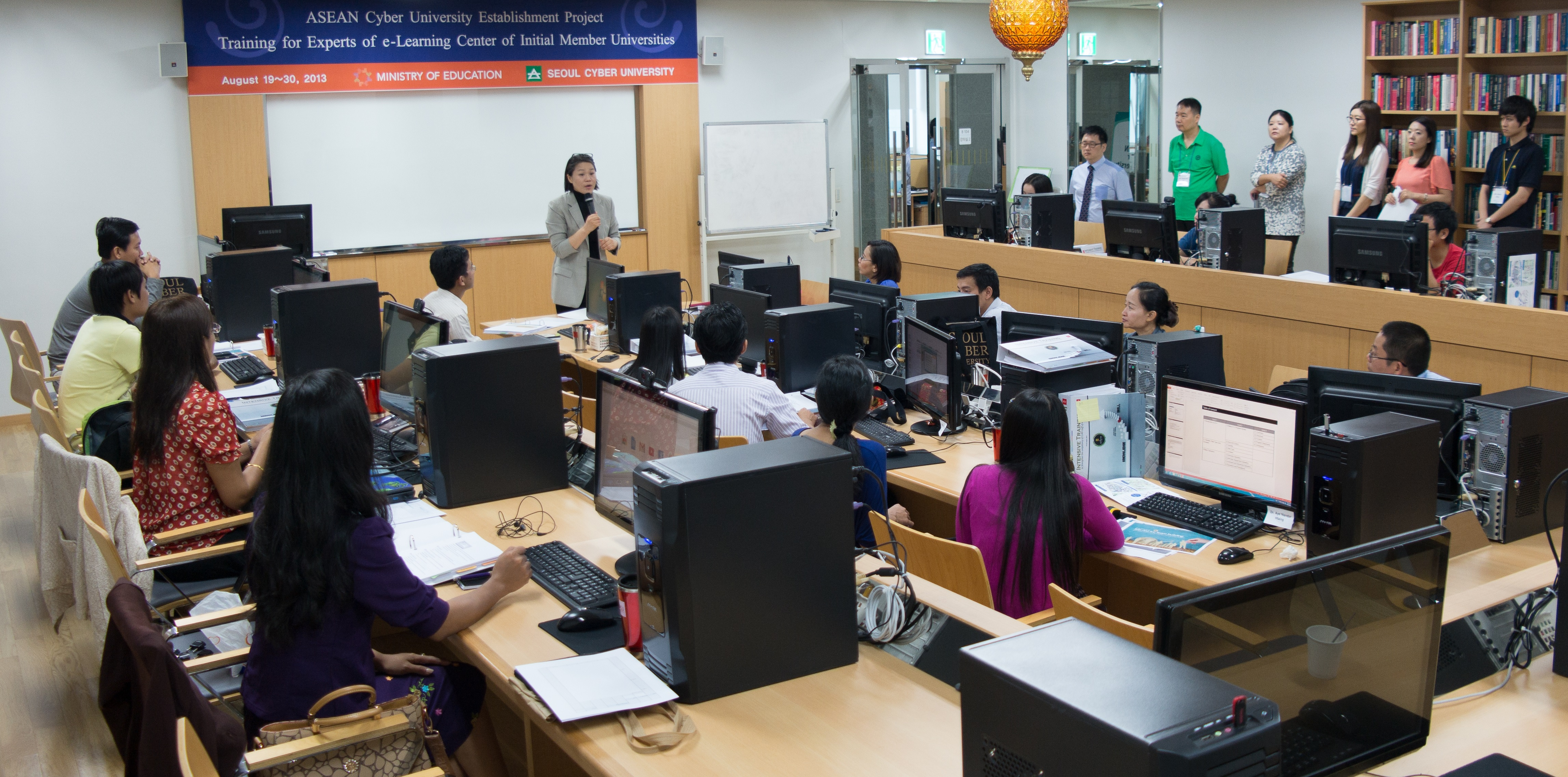
ACU Project Intensive Training on e-Learning

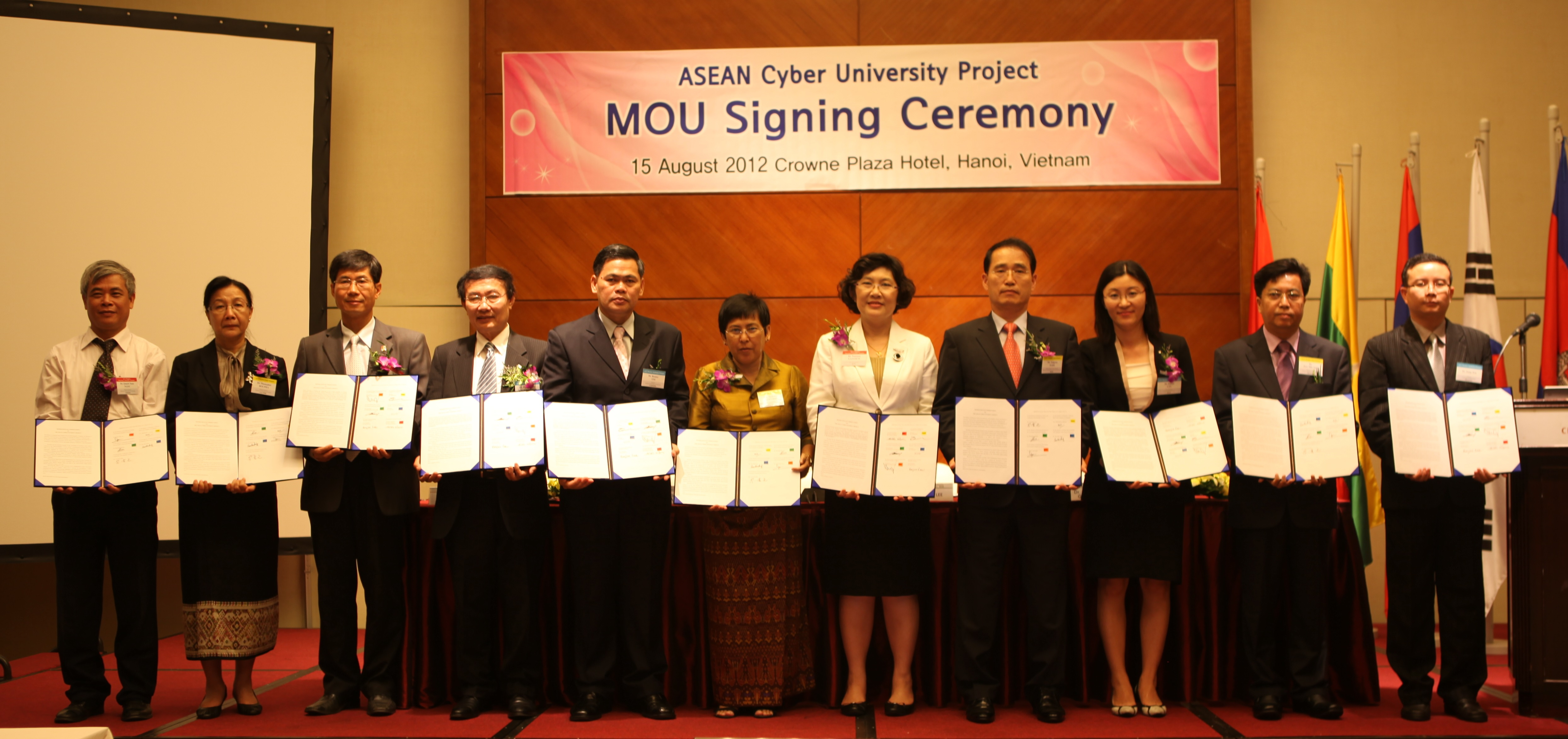
ACU Project-MOU signing ceremony

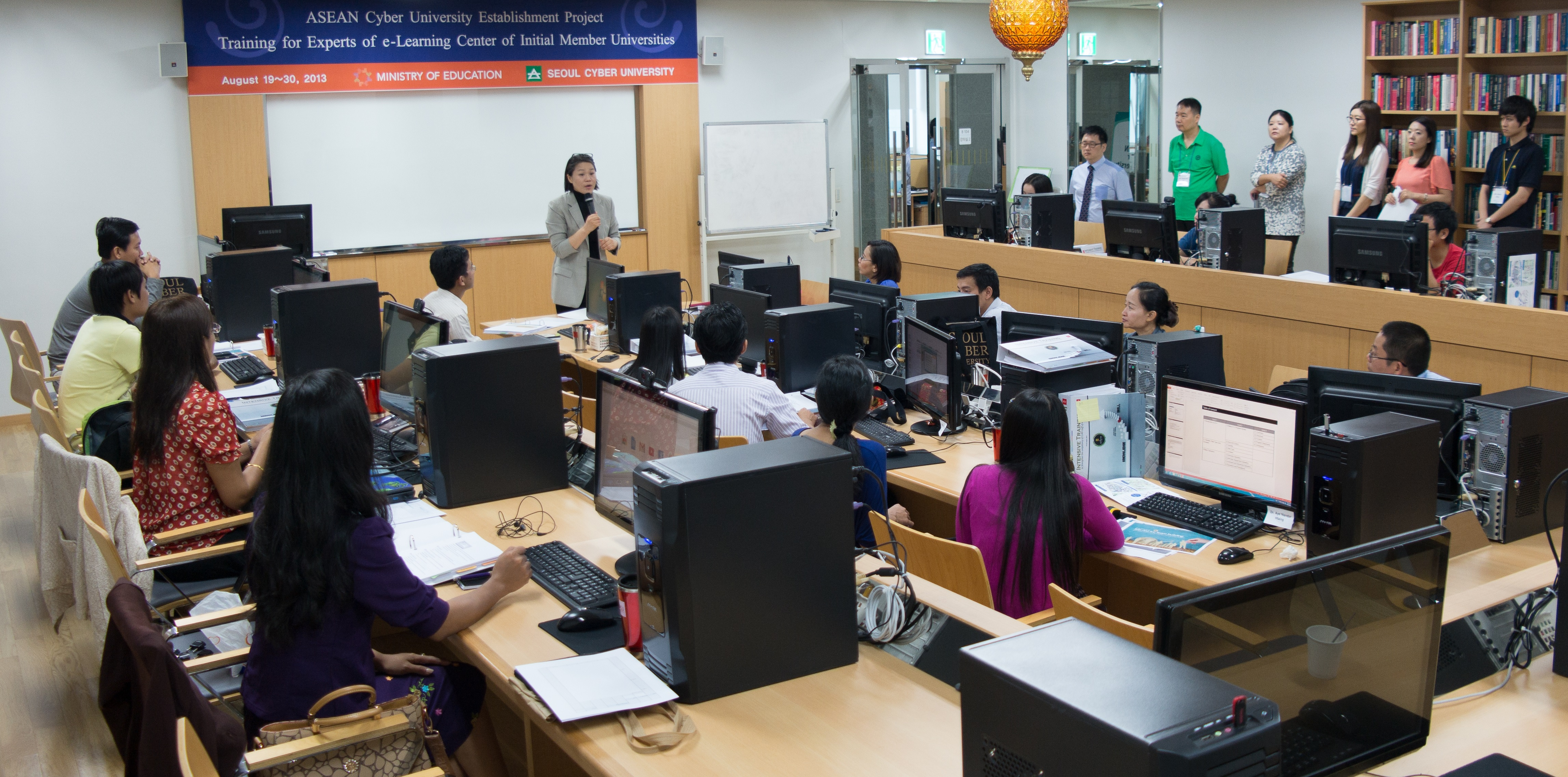
ACU Project Intensive Training on e-learning
