= Gireum station =

Train station in Seoul, South Korea

길음; Gireum
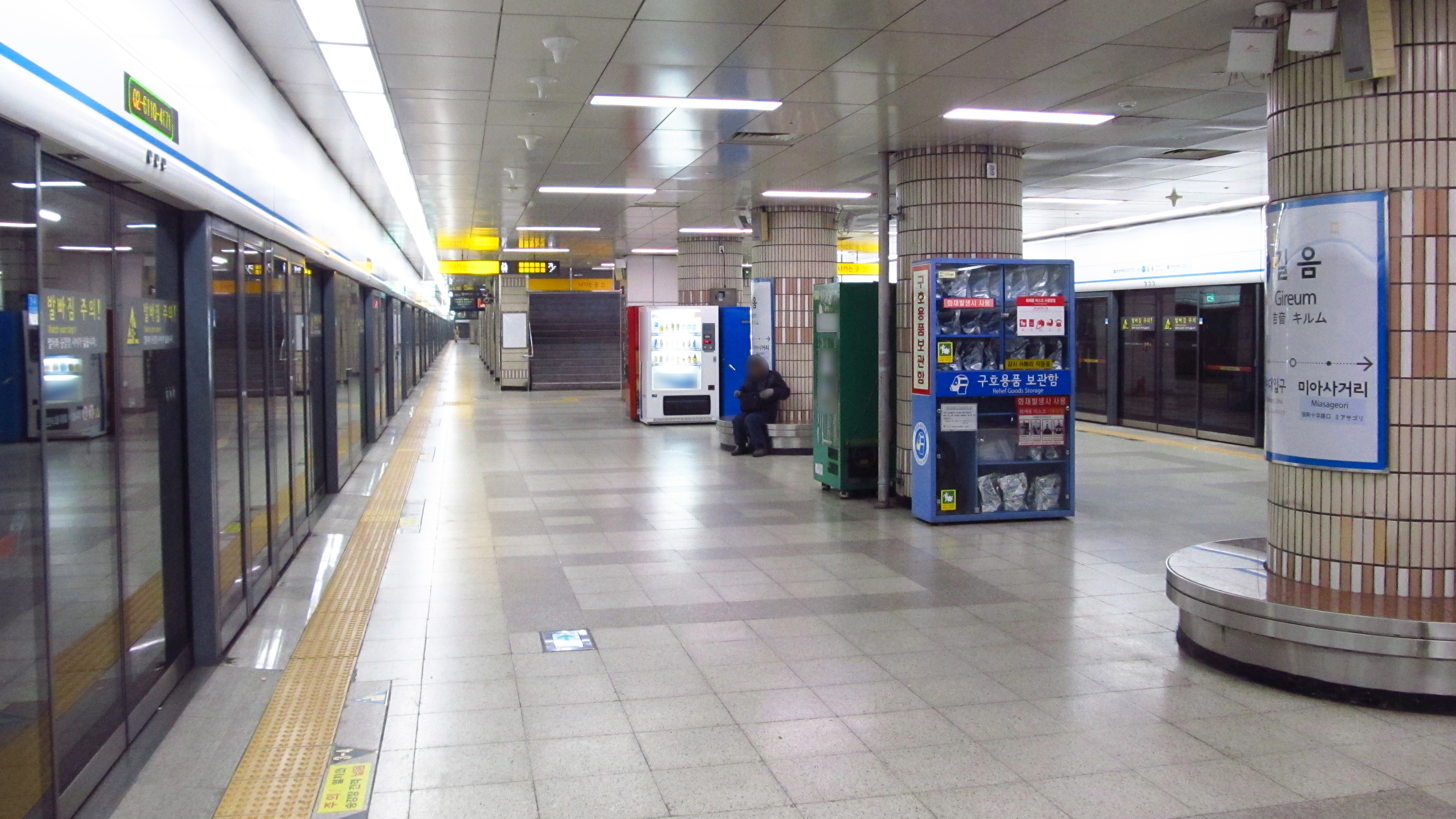

Korean name
- Hangul: 길음역
- Hanja: 吉音驛
- Revised Romanization: Gireum-yeok
- McCune–Reischauer: Kirŭm-yŏk

General information
- Location: 248 Dongsomun-ro, 877-66 Gireum 1-dong, Seongbuk-gu, Seoul
- Coordinates: 37°36′12″N 127°01′30″E
- Operated by: Seoul Metro
- Line(s): Line 4
- Platforms: 1
- Tracks: 2

Construction
- Structure type: Underground

History
- Opened: October 18, 1985

Passengers
- (Daily) Based on Jan-Dec of 2012. Line 4: 54,566

Services
Preceding station	Seoul Metropolitan Subway	Following station
Miasageori towards Jinjeop	Line 4	Sungshin Women's University towards Oido

Gireum Station (Korean: 길음역) is an underground station of the Seoul Subway Line 4 in Gireum-dong, Seongbuk District, Seoul, South Korea. Jeongneung tomb lies nearby.

== Station layout ==
G	Street level	Exit

L1; Concourse	Lobby	Customer Service, Shops, Vending machines, ATMs

L2; Platforms	Northbound	← Line 4 toward Jinjeop (Miasageori)
L2; Platforms	Island platform, doors will open on the left
L2; Platforms	Southbound	Line 4 toward Oido (Sungshin Women's Univ.) →

== Neighborhood ==
- Seoul Jongam Police Station
