= Park Yong-jin =

South Korean politician (born 1971)

- 박용진
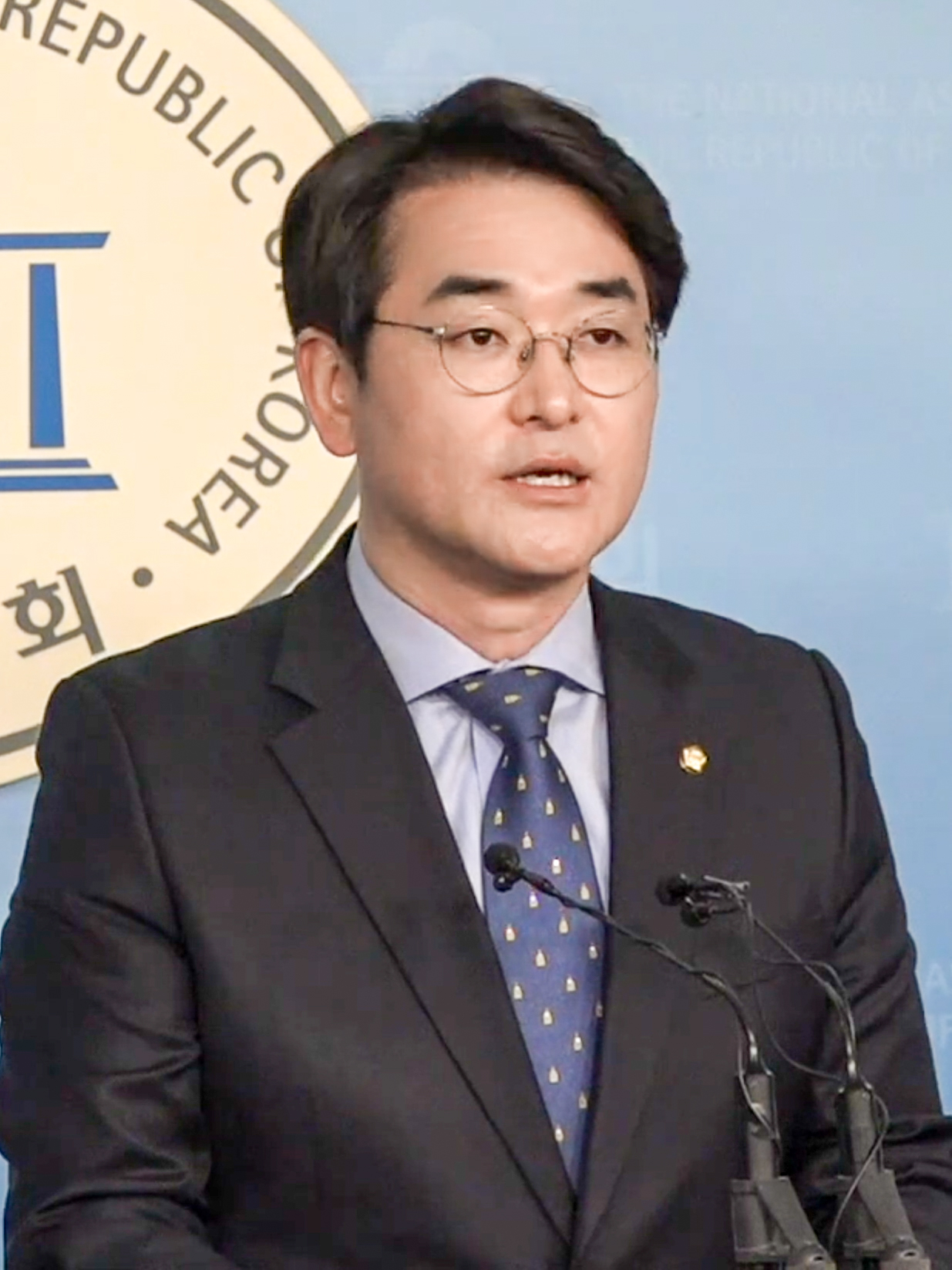
- Park in May 2019

Member of the National Assembly
- In office 30 May 2016 – 24 May 2024
- Preceded by: Yoo Dae-woon
- Succeeded by: Han Min-soo
- Constituency: Seoul Gangbuk B

Personal details
- Born: 17 April 1971 (age 55) Jangsu, North Jeolla, South Korea
- Party: Democratic Party of Korea (2012–present)
- Other political affiliations: Democratic Labor Party (2000–08); New Progressive Party (2008–12); DUP → DP
- Education: Sungkyunkwan University
- Website: www.parkyongjin.com

- Park Yong-jin
- Hangul: 박용진
- Hanja: 朴用鎭
- RR: Bak Yongjin
- MR: Pak Yongjin

Park Yong-jin (Korean: 박용진; born 17 April 1971) is a South Korean labor activist and politician in the liberal Minjoo Party of Korea. He was elected member of the National Assembly for Gangbuk, Seoul, in the April 2016 parliamentary elections.

Park was a founding member of the left-wing Democratic Labor Party, standing unsuccessfully as a parliamentary candidate in the Gyeongbuk B constituency in 2000 and serving as the party's spokesman from 2004. He stayed with the DLP from its establishment in 2000 until 2008, when the party's pro–labor rights People's Democracy faction parted ways with the nationalist National Liberty faction. Park followed the PD group to the splinter New Progressive Party. He stood for the Assembly again as an NPP candidate in Gangbuk B in the parliamentary election that year, but was defeated a second time, garnering 11.8 percent of the vote.

In 2012, Park changed his affiliation again to the main liberal Democratic United Party. He became head of public relations for the Democratic Party—as the DUP renamed itself—in 2014, but resigned following the 2014 by-elections, 30 days after assuming the office. He won Gangbuk B for the Minjoo Party, the Democratic Party's successor, in the 2016 elections. He will enter the National Assembly on 30 May 2016.

A labor advocate, Park has been imprisoned multiple times for his activism. He spent several months in prison after taking part in a sympathy strike with railway workers in 1994, and was imprisoned again after participating in protests against employee cutbacks at Daewoo in 2001. He was eventually released in April 2003 after over two years in detention.

Born in Jangsu County in North Jeolla, Park studied sociology at Sungkyunkwan University.

Park stood as a candidate for the Democratic Party's presidential primary candidate selection for the 2022 presidential election. He lost the election to Lee Jae Myung who became the party's candidate for the 2022 presidential election.

== Election results ==
Year	Elections	Constituency	Political party	Votes (%)	Results
2000	16th National Assembly General Election	Gangbuk B (Seoul)	DLP	8,381 (13.26%)	Defeated (3rd)
2008	18th National Assembly General Election	Gangbuk B (Seoul)	NPP	7,088 (11.68%)	Defeated (3rd)
2016	20th National Assembly General Election	Gangbuk B (Seoul)	Democratic	37,445 (51.08%)	Won
2020	21st National Assembly General Election	Gangbuk B (Seoul)	Democratic	57,013 (64.45%)	Won
