= Suyu station =

Station of the Seoul Metropolitan Subway

수유 (강북구청); Suyu (Gangbuk-gu Office)
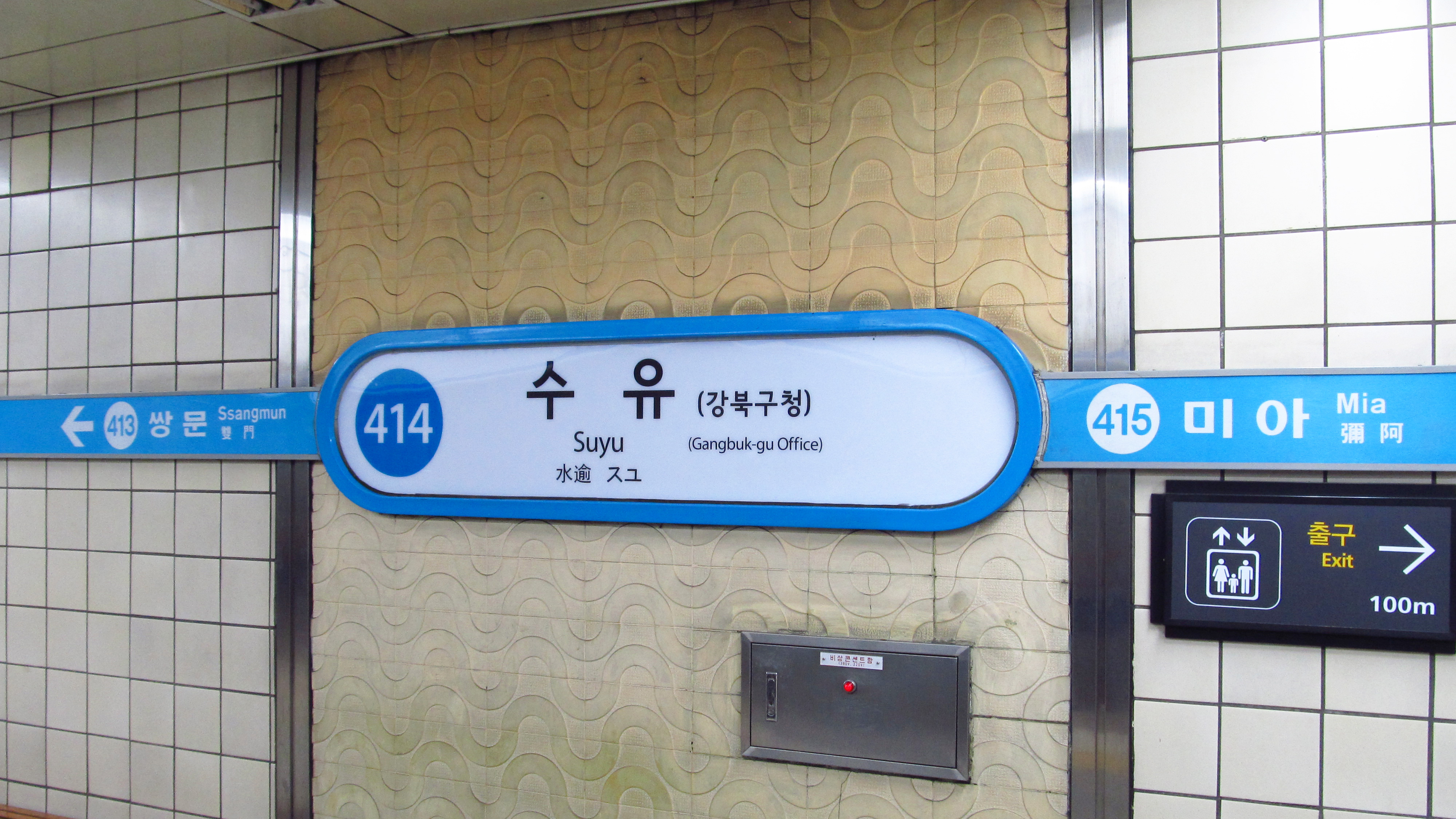

Korean name
- Hangul: 수유역
- Hanja: 水踰驛
- Revised Romanization: Suyu-yeok
- McCune–Reischauer: Suyu-yŏk

General information
- Location: 338 Dobong-ro, 140 Suyu-dong, Gangbuk-gu, Seoul
- Coordinates: 37.63806°N 127.02574°E
- Operated by: Seoul Metro
- Line(s): Line 4
- Platforms: 2
- Tracks: 2

Construction
- Structure type: Underground

History
- Opened: April 20, 1985

Passengers
- (Daily) Based on Jan-Dec of 2012. Line 4: 89,974

Services
Preceding station	Seoul Metropolitan Subway	Following station
Ssangmun towards Jinjeop	Line 4	Mia towards Oido

Suyu Station (Korean: 수유역; Hanja: 水踰驛) is an underground station on the Seoul Subway Line 4 in Suyu-dong, Gangbuk-gu, Seoul, South Korea.

== Station layout ==
G	Street level	Exit

L1; Concourse	Lobby	Customer Service, Shops, Vending machines, ATMs

L2; Platforms	Side platform, doors will open on the right
L2; Platforms	Northbound	← Line 4 toward Jinjeop (Ssangmun)
L2; Platforms	Southbound	Line 4 toward Oido (Mia) →
L2; Platforms	Side platform, doors will open on the right
