= Sinjeong-dong, Mapo =

Sinjeong-dong
- Country: South Korea

Area
  - Total: 6.93 km^{2} (2.68 sq mi)

Population (2001)
  - Total: 182,755
  - Density: 26,400/km^{2} (68,300/sq mi)

Korean name
- Hangul: 신정동
- Hanja: 新亭洞
- RR: Sinjeong-dong
- MR: Sinjŏng-dong

Sinjeong-dong (Korean: 신정동) is a dong (neighbourhood) of Mapo District, Seoul, South Korea.

== See also ==
- Administrative divisions of South Korea
