= Gireum-dong =

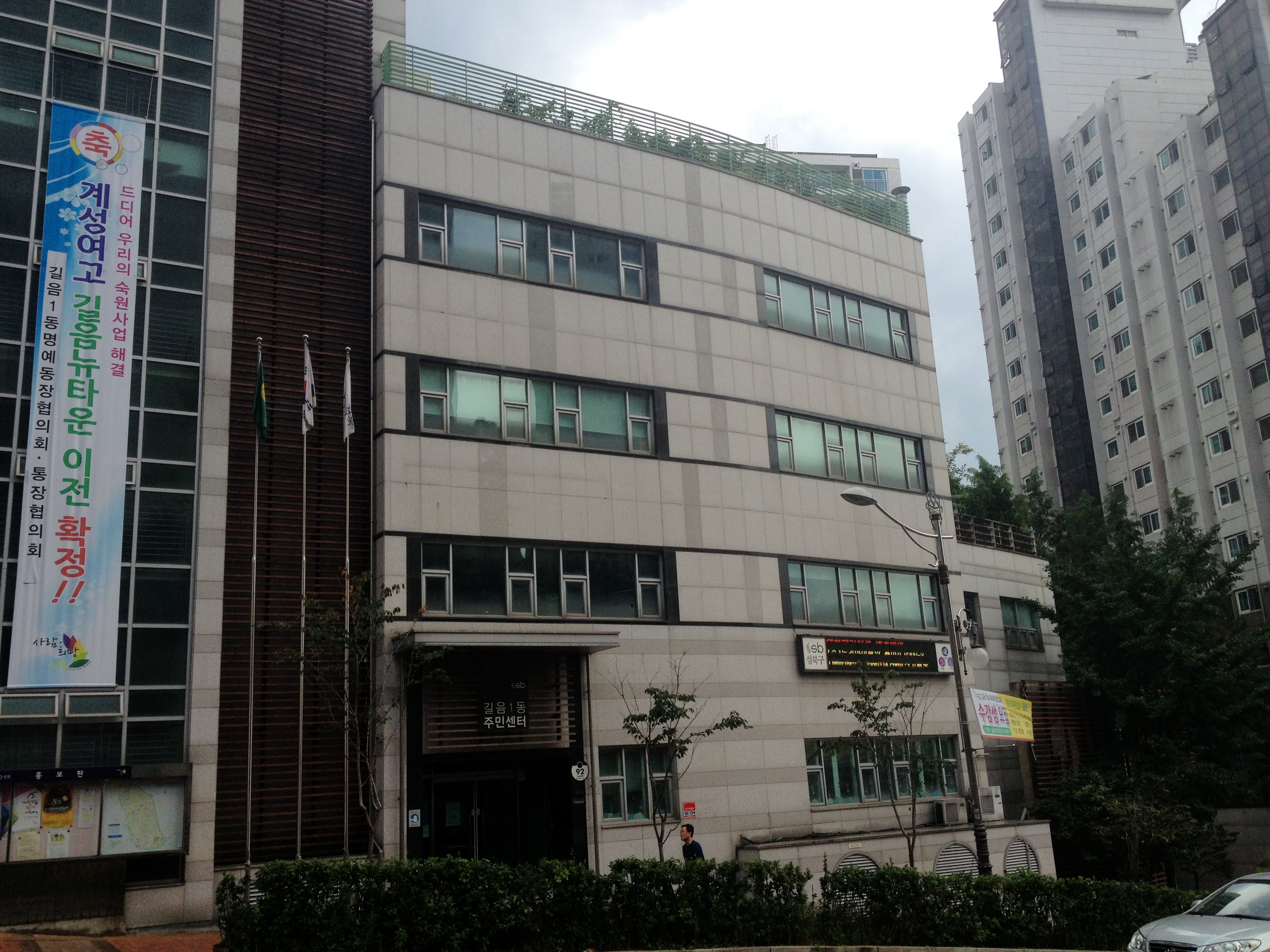
- Gireum 1-dong Community Service Center (Seongbuk District)
- Country: South Korea

Area
  - Total: 1.32 km^{2} (0.51 sq mi)

Population (2008)
  - Total: 49,559
  - Density: 37,500/km^{2} (97,200/sq mi)

Korean name
- Hangul: 길음동
- Hanja: 吉音洞
- RR: Gireum-dong
- MR: Kirŭm-dong

Gireum-dong (Korean: 길음동) is a dong (neighborhood) of Seongbuk District, Seoul, South Korea.

== See also ==
- Gireum Station
- Administrative divisions of South Korea

Gireum is a rapidly developing area, one of the so-called "new towns" being developed by the Seoul City government in areas previously less crowded.
