= Goseong =

Goseong may refer to:

- Goseong County, South Gyeongsang, a county in South Gyeongsang Province, South Korea
- Goseong County, Gangwon, a county in Gangwon Province, South Korea
- Kosong County, a county in Kangwon Province, North Korea
