= Beon-dong =

Coordinates: 37.628°N 127.037°E

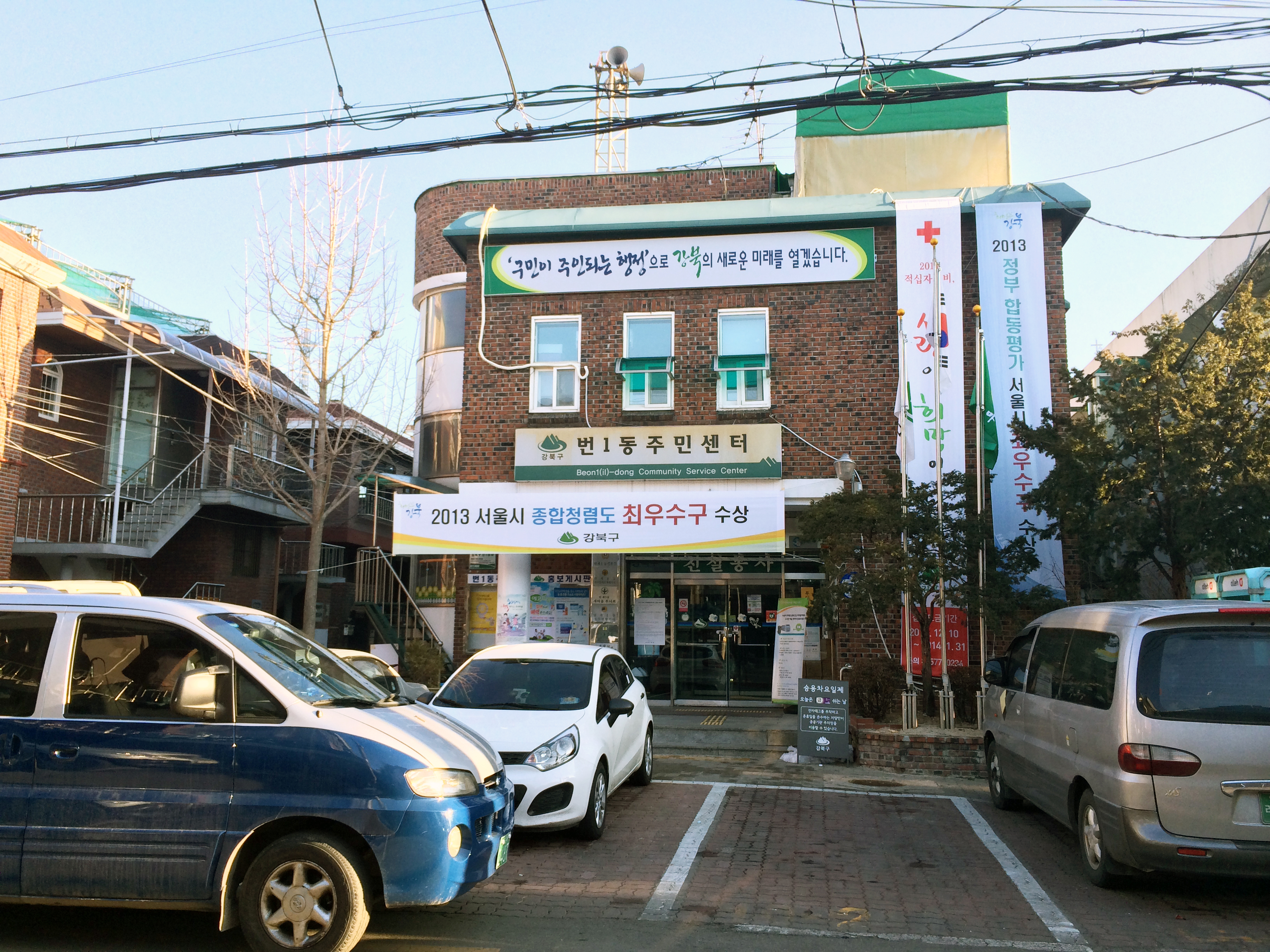
- Beonjeil-dong Community Service Center
- Interactive map of Beon-dong
- Country: South Korea

Area
  - Total: 2.66 km^{2} (1.03 sq mi)

Population (2008)
  - Total: 63,347
  - Density: 27,004/km^{2} (69,940/sq mi)

Korean name
- Hangul: 번동
- Hanja: 樊洞
- RR: Beon-dong
- MR: Pŏn-dong

Beon-dong (Korean: 번동) is a dong (neighborhood) of Gangbuk District, Seoul, South Korea.

== Overview ==
Beon 1-dong is a transportation hub, with Suyu Station on Subway Line 4 and major roads such as Dobong-ro, Hancheon-ro, and Deokneung-ro running through it. The area contains public institutions, including Gangbuk Police Station, as well as Susong Elementary and Middle Schools, officetels, and apartments.

Beon 2-dong is located along Hancheon-ro, near Odong Neighborhood Park (Opaesan) and the Uicheon stream. The area has public rental apartments and multi-family housing. Public facilities such as a health center, district sports complex, cultural information center, and the Gangbuk Wellbeing Sports Center are located in this area.

Beon 3-dong is located at the southernmost part of Gangbuk District, bordering Nowon District to the east and Seongbuk District to the south. The area is near the Buk Seoul Dream Forest and is traversed by the Uicheon stream.

== See also ==
- Administrative divisions of South Korea
