= Eungbong-dong =

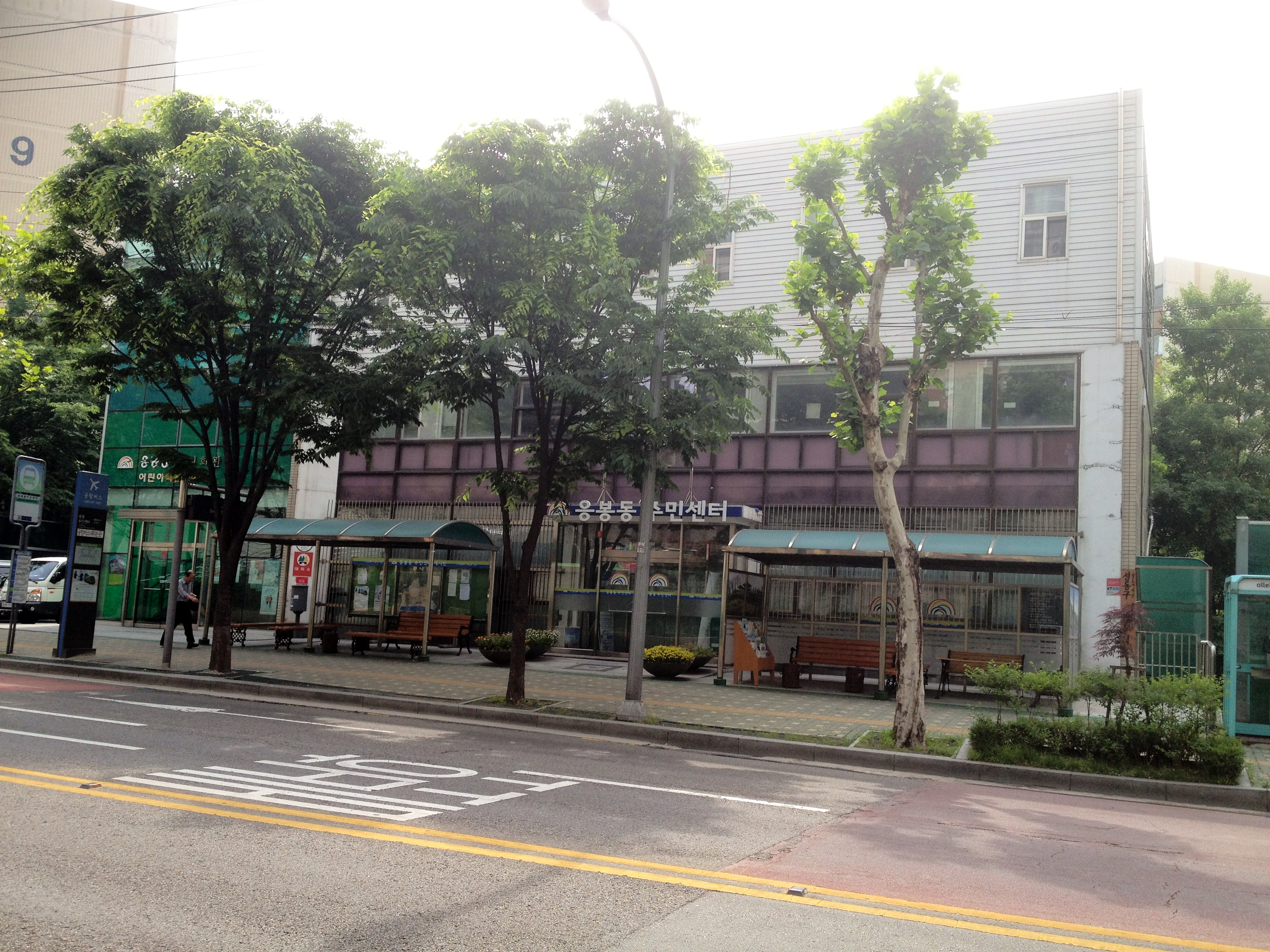
- Eungbong-dong Community Service Center
- Interactive map of Eungbong-dong
- Coordinates: 37°33′06″N 127°02′02″E
- Country: South Korea

Area
  - Total: 0.57 km^{2} (0.22 sq mi)

Population (2001)
  - Total: 13,572
  - Density: 24,000/km^{2} (62,000/sq mi)

Korean name
- Hangul: 응봉동
- Hanja: 鷹峰洞
- RR: Eungbong-dong
- MR: Ŭngbong-dong

Eungbong-dong (Korean: 응봉동) is a dong (neighborhood) of Seongdong District, Seoul, South Korea.

== See also ==
- Administrative divisions of South Korea
