= Mia-dong =

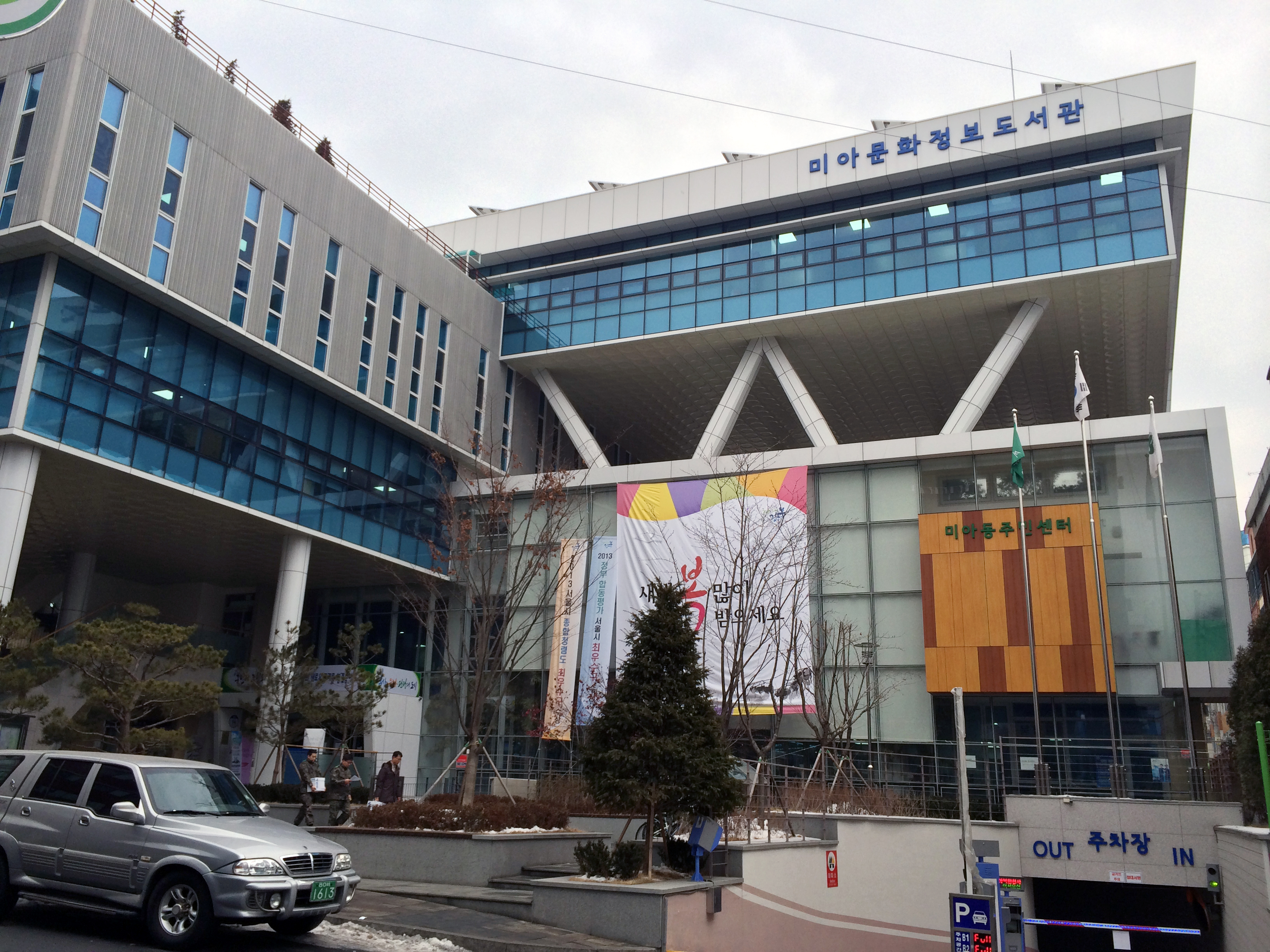
- Mia-dong Community Service Center
- Interactive map of Mia-dong
- Country: South Korea

Area
  - Total: 0.73 km^{2} (0.28 sq mi)

Population (2008)
  - Total: 25,525
  - Density: 34,966/km^{2} (90,560/sq mi)

Korean name
- Hangul: 미아동
- Hanja: 彌阿洞
- RR: Mia-dong
- MR: Mia-dong

Mia-dong (Korean: 미아동) is a dong (neighbourhood) of Gangbuk District, Seoul, South Korea. From June 30, 2008, nine administrative Mia-dongs were divided Mia-dong (Mia 3-dong), Samgaksan-dong (Mia 6 and 7-dong), Samyang-dong (Mia 1 and 2-dong), Songcheon-dong (Mia 5 and 8-dong) and Songjung-dong (Mia 4 and 9-dong). Remained Mia-dong is former Mia 3-dong.

== Etymology ==
The name Mia-dong first appears in official records during the early reign of King Gojong of the Joseon dynasty, but its origin is unclear.

== See also ==
- Administrative divisions of South Korea
