= Mangu-dong =

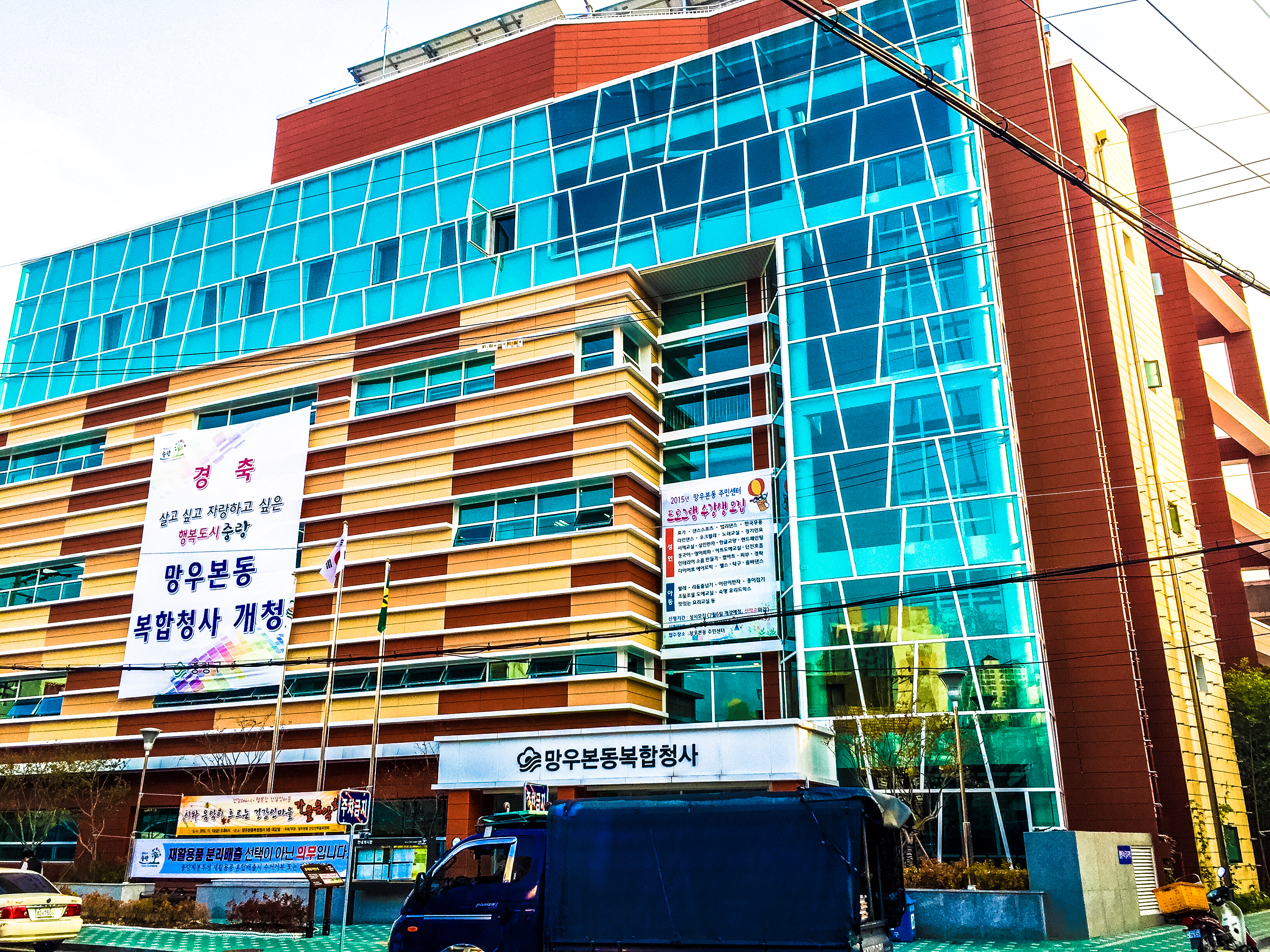
- Mangubon-dong Community Service Center
- Interactive map of Mangu-dong
- Country: South Korea

Area
  - Total: 3.87 km^{2} (1.49 sq mi)

Population (2001)
  - Total: 59,855
  - Density: 15,500/km^{2} (40,100/sq mi)

Korean name
- Hangul: 망우동
- Hanja: 忘憂洞
- RR: Mangu-dong
- MR: Mangu-dong

Mangu-dong (Korean: 망우동) is a dong (neighbourhood) of Jungnang District, Seoul, South Korea.

== See also ==
- Administrative divisions of South Korea
