= Suyu-dong =

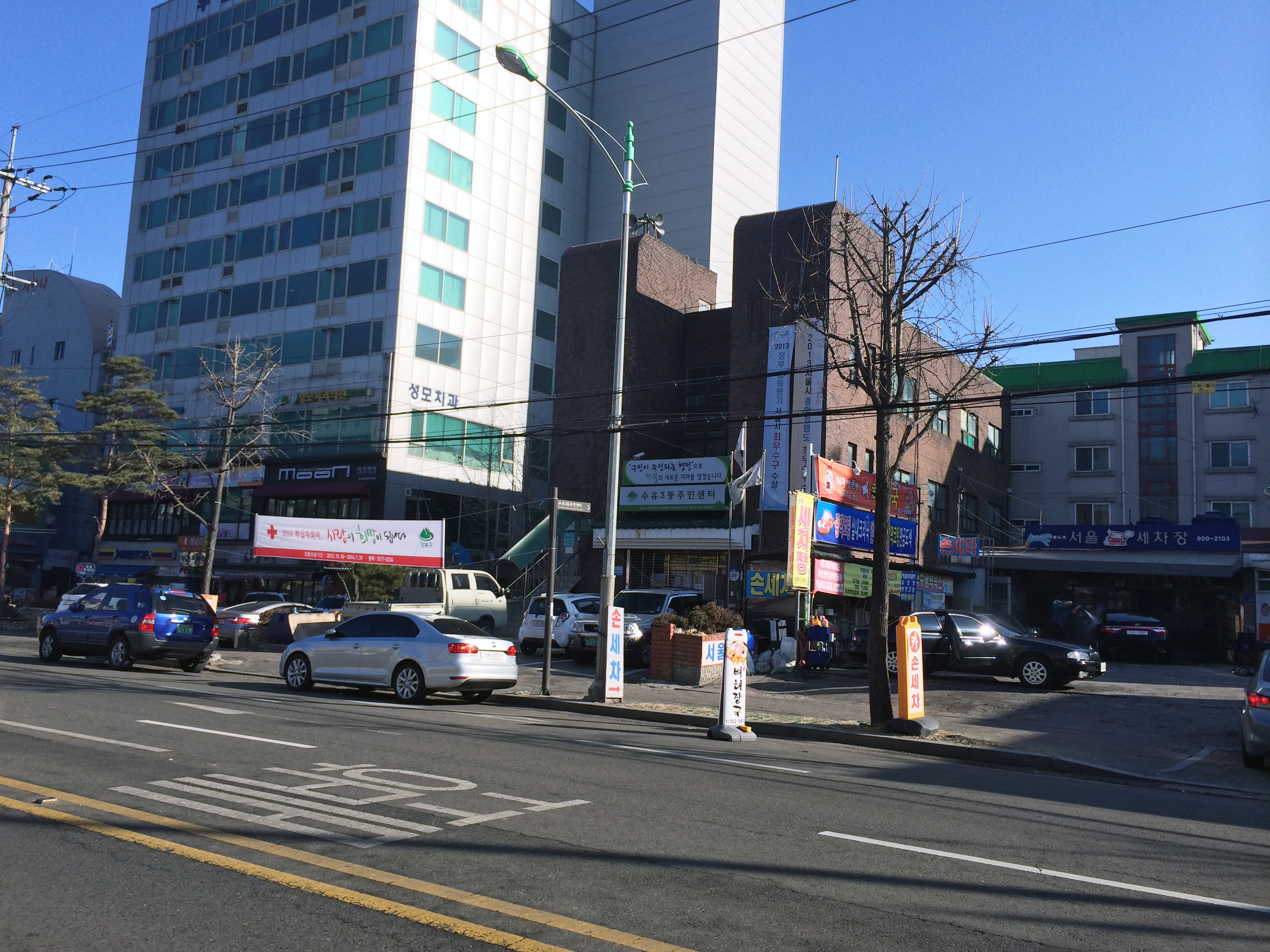
- Suyu-dong Community Center
- Country: South Korea

Area
  - Total: 2.66 km^{2} (1.03 sq mi)

Population (2008)
  - Total: 71,067
  - Density: 27,105/km^{2} (70,200/sq mi)

Korean name
- Hangul: 수유동
- Hanja: 水踰洞
- RR: Suyu-dong
- MR: Suyu-dong

Suyu-dong (Korean: 수유동) is a dong (neighbourhood) of Gangbuk District, Seoul, South Korea. From June 30, 2008, six administrative Suyu-dongs were divided to Insu-dong (Suyu 5 and 6 dong), Ui-dong (Suyu 4-dong), and Suyu-dong (Suyu 1, 2, and 3 dong).

== History ==
It was previously known as Suyu-ri (Suyu Village), and was a part of Goyang County, Gyeonggi Province. In 1949 it became a part of Seongbuk District, and was reclassified from a ri to a dong in 1950. In 1973, it was one of the dong that was split off from Seongbuk District to form Dobong District, and then in 1995 it was reassigned to its present Gangbuk District.

== See also ==
- Administrative divisions of South Korea
