= Singil-dong =

- Country: South Korea

Area
  - Total: 3.58 km^{2} (1.38 sq mi)

Population (2001)
  - Total: 146,519
  - Density: 40,900/km^{2} (106,000/sq mi)

Korean name
- Hangul: 신길동
- Hanja: 新吉洞
- RR: Singil-dong
- MR: Sin'gil-tong

Singil-dong (Korean: 신길동) is a dong (neighbourhood) of Yeongdeungpo District, Seoul, South Korea.

== Overview ==
Singil-dong, positioned in proximity to Yeouido and Saetgang, historically served as a pivotal transportation nexus distinguished by its ferry terminal, Banghakhojin (放鶴湖津), which facilitated access to Seoul during the Joseon period. Predominantly characterized as an agricultural enclave, the area featured extensive flatlands dominating its topography. The etymology of the appellation "Singil-dong" remains uncertain, however, it is conjectured to have been bestowed with aspirations for auspicious occurrences within the community, as "Singil (新吉)" connotes "new luck" or "good fortune," ostensibly in allusion to its port status.

== See also ==
- Administrative divisions of South Korea
