= Guui-dong =

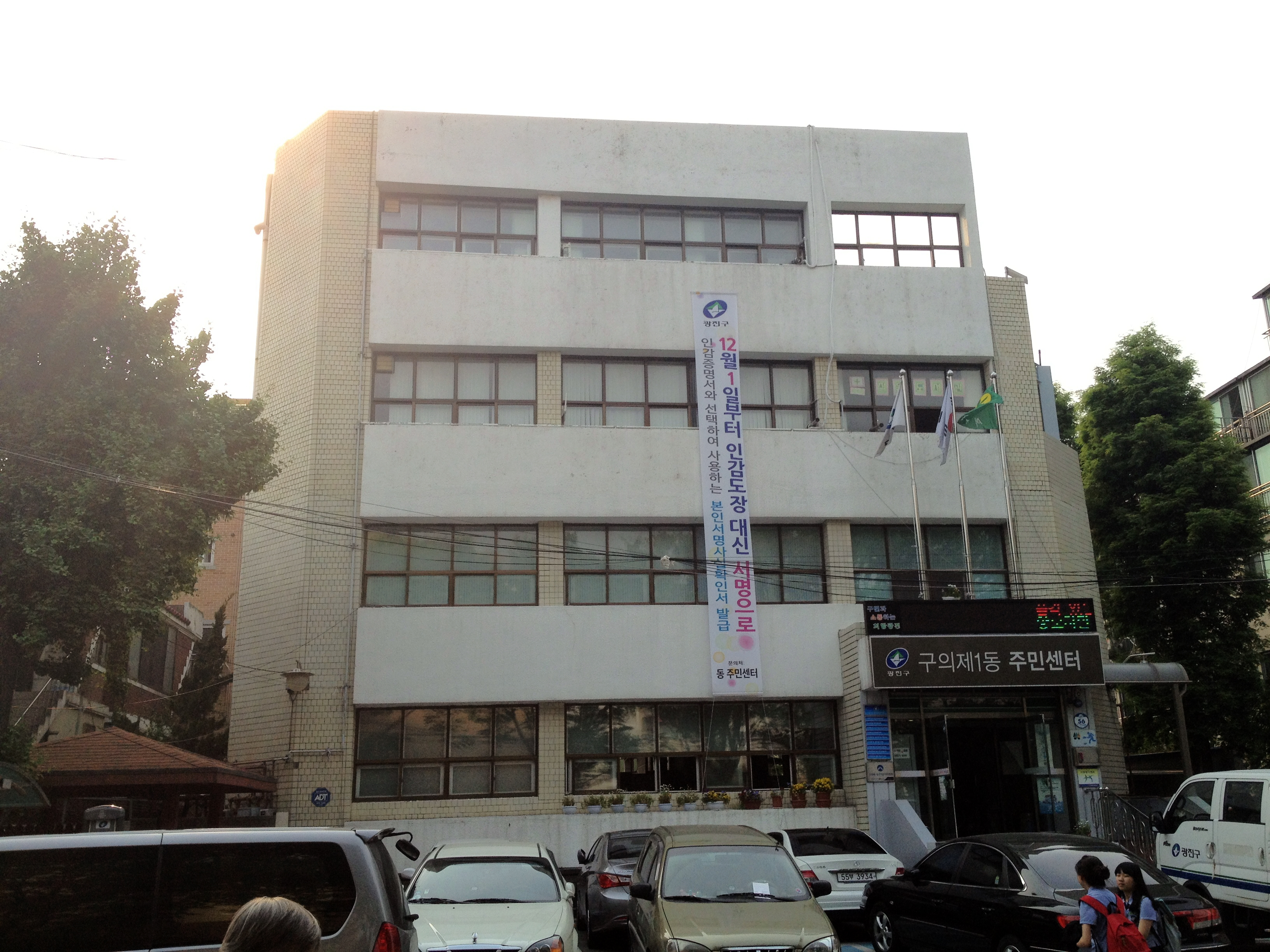
- Guui 1-dong Community Service Center (Gwangjin-gu)
- Country: South Korea

Area
  - Total: 3.10 km^{2} (1.20 sq mi)

Population (2001)
  - Total: 79,098
  - Density: 25,500/km^{2} (66,100/sq mi)

Korean name
- Hangul: 구의동
- Hanja: 九宜洞
- RR: Guui-dong
- MR: Kuŭi-dong

Guui-dong (Korean: 구의동) is a dong (neighborhood) of Gwangjin District, Seoul, South Korea.

== History ==
The name Guro-dong comes from a legend that there were nine long-lived old people here. Guro-dong is bordered by Anyangcheon and Seoul Digital Industrial Complex, adjacent to Gwangmyeong and Geumcheon District, and the outskirts of the Gyeongin Line, Gyeongbu Line, and the southern ring road and the western arterial road are adjacent to each other.

In Guro 3-dong, the Guro Industrial Export Complex, which was a symbol of the chimney industry, has been transformed into a high-tech digital venture valley, and the residential environment is greatly improved due to the redevelopment of old and defective houses. In addition, it is an area where the floating population is rapidly increasing due to the adjoining of venture companies in the digital complex and Seoul subway lines 2 and 7.

== See also ==
- Administrative divisions of South Korea
