= Hwagok-dong =

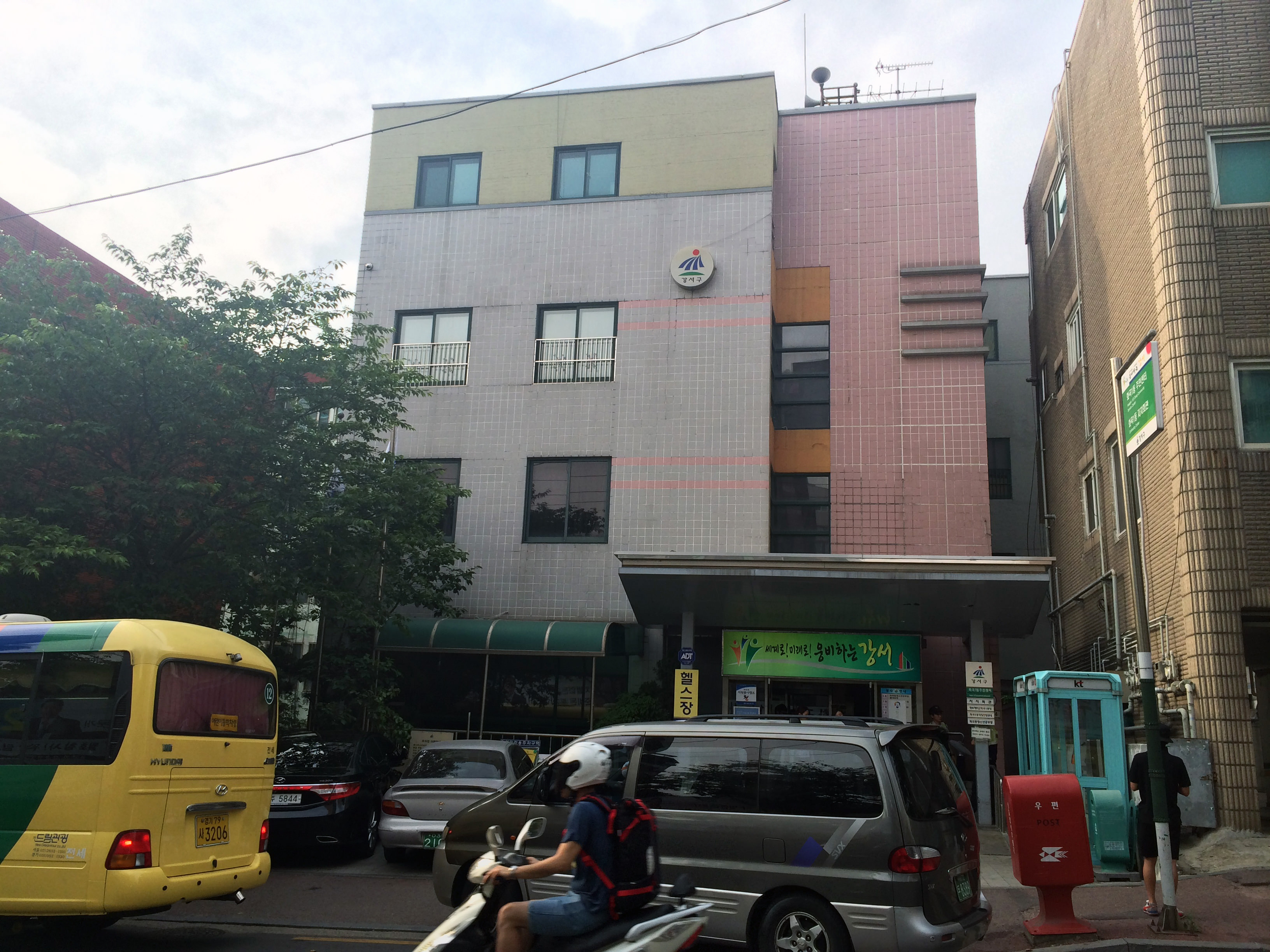
- Hwagok-dong Community Service Center
- Country: South Korea

Area
  - Total: 6.46 km^{2} (2.49 sq mi)

Population (2001)
  - Total: 203,932
  - Density: 31,568/km^{2} (81,760/sq mi)

Korean name
- Hangul: 화곡동
- Hanja: 禾谷洞
- RR: Hwagok-dong
- MR: Hwagok-tong

Hwagok-dong (Korean: 화곡동) is a dong (neighborhood) of Gangseo District, Seoul, South Korea. Hwagok-dong consists of 1, 2, 3, 4, 6, 8, and the main dong.

== Overview ==
The area formerly known as Hwagok-ri has developed into a central part of Gangseo District and is now divided into nine administrative neighborhoods (dong). The present-day Hwagok-dong encompasses the historical areas of Neung-dong (菱洞), Bangok-ri (盤谷里), Yeokchon-ri (驛村里), and Hwagok-ri (禾谷里). Specifically, Neung-dong corresponds to modern Hwagok 4-dong, Bangok-ri to Hwagok 3-dong, Yeokchon-ri to Hwagok 6-dong, and the original Hwagok-ri to Hwagok 5-dong. Hwagok 2-dong and 8-dong developed around a small village centered in Neunggol, while Hwagok Bon-dong (Main Hwagok-dong) originated as a small settlement called Joeok-dong (also known as Chorok-dong), which consisted of only three households on a hillside overlooking Yeokchon-ri.

Hwagok 1-dong, in contrast, was an uninhabited hillside with no historical record of residential activity. It served primarily as a mountain pass connecting the Deobeuri village in Hwagok 8-dong to Gomdallae (formerly known as Goeumwolli). In 1963, the city of Seoul initiated a housing development project in Hwagok-dong, known as the "100,000-unit project," aimed at accommodating the growing population of northern Seoul. This project was later expanded in 1968 to a "300,000-unit project," leading to extensive residential construction across the hillside and the eventual establishment of Hwagok 1-dong.

== Attractions ==
- 88 Gymnasium - Lee Min Woo of Shinhwa held his first solo concert entitled "M's Girl Friend", on 14 and 15 January 2006.

== See also ==
- Administrative divisions of South Korea
