= Insu-dong =

- Interactive map of Insu-dong
- Location within Seoul Location within South Korea
- Coordinates: 37°38′05″N 127°00′11″E
- Country: South Korea

Area
  - Total: 1.32 km^{2} (0.51 sq mi)

Population (2008)
  - Total: 49,599
  - Density: 37,600/km^{2} (97,300/sq mi)

Korean name
- Hangul: 인수동
- Hanja: 仁壽洞
- RR: Insu-dong
- MR: Insu-dong

Insu-dong (Korean: 인수동) is a dong (neighborhood) of Gangbuk District, Seoul, South Korea. From 30 June 2008, the former Suyu-5 and 6 dong were combined to form this dong.

== Origin of the name ==
The name Insu-dong is derived from Insubong, one of the three peaks of Bukhansan.

== See also ==
- Administrative divisions of South Korea
