= Gangbuk District =

District of Seoul, South Korea

Gangbuk
- Autonomous District
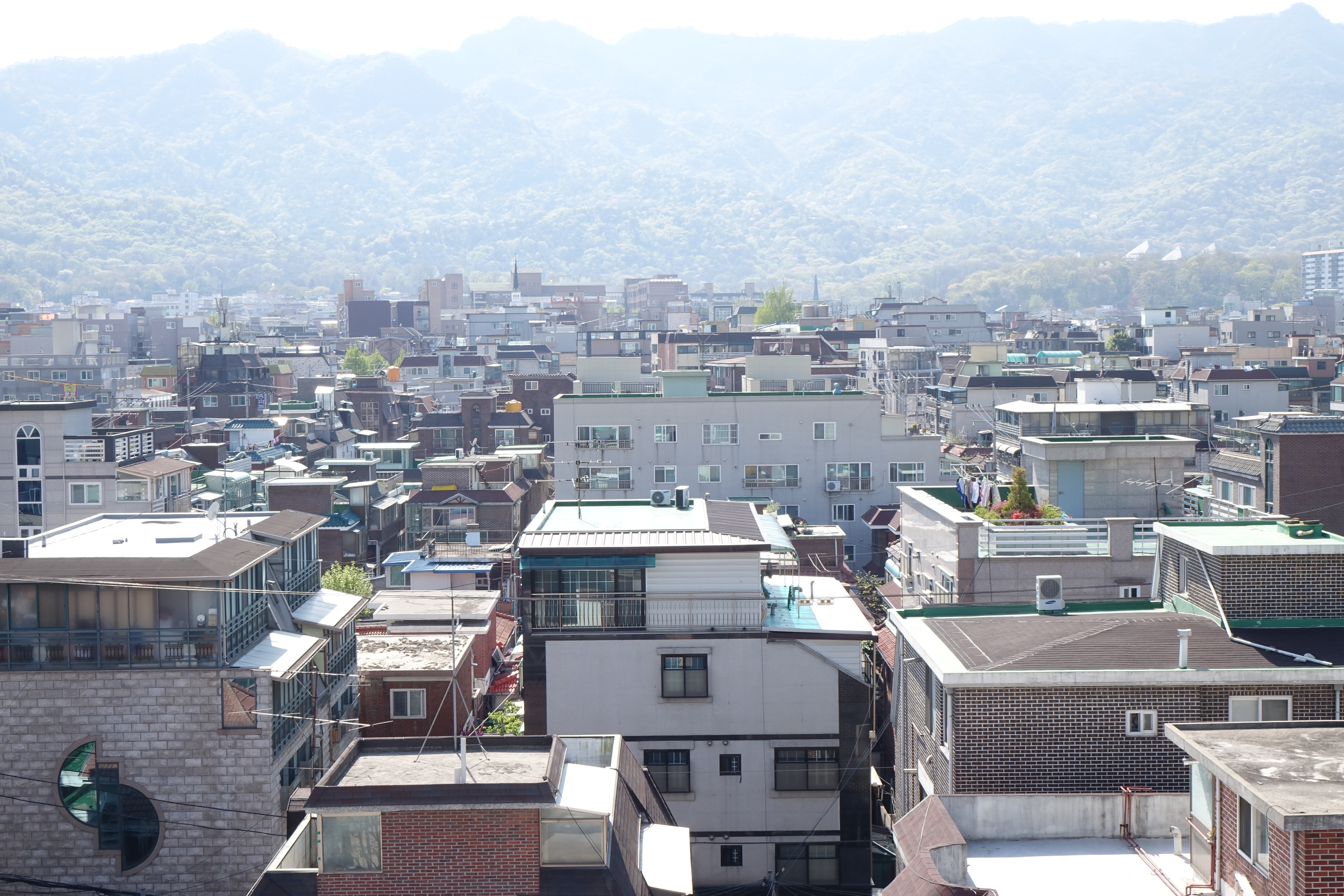
- Suyu-dong

- Flag

- Location of Gangbuk District in Seoul
- Interactive map of Gangbuk
- Coordinates: 37°38′22.60″N 127°1′32.36″E
- Country: South Korea
- Region: Sudogwon
- Special city: Seoul
- Administrative dong: 18

Government
  - Body: Gangbuk District Council
  - Mayor: Jung Chang-soo (Democratic)
  - MNAs: List of MNAs: Cheon Joon-ho (Democratic); Park Yong-jin (Democratic)

Area
  - Total: 23.6 km^{2} (9.1 sq mi)

Population (2010)
  - Total: 284,313
  - Density: 12,000/km^{2} (31,200/sq mi)
- Time zone: UTC+9 (Korea Standard Time)
- Postal code: 01000~01299
- Website: Gangbuk District official website

Korean name
- Hangul: 강북구
- Hanja: 江北區
- RR: Gangbuk-gu
- MR: Kangbuk-ku

Gangbuk District (Korean: 강북구) is one of the 25 gu which make up the city of Seoul, South Korea. Its name is derived from its location north of the Han river. It was created from the neighbouring Dobong District in 1995. The current mayor is Park Gyeom-su.

== Administrative divisions ==
Administrative divisions

- Songjung-dong (송중동; 松中洞); Legal dong is Mia-dong
- Songcheon-dong (송천동; 松泉洞); Legal dong is Mia-dong
- Samgaksan-dong (삼각산동; 三角山洞); Legal dong is Mia-dong
- Samyang-dong (삼양동; 三陽洞); Legal dong is Mia-dong
- Mia-dong (미아동; 彌阿洞); Legal dong is Mia-dong
- Beon-dong (번동; 樊洞); Legal dong is Beon-dong
- Suyu-dong (수유동; 水踰洞); Legal dong is Suyu-dong
- Insu-dong (인수동; 仁壽洞); Legal dong is Suyu-dong
- Ui-dong (우이동; 牛耳洞); Legal dong is Ui-dong

== Transportation ==
=== Railroad ===
- Seoul Metro

- Seoul Subway Line 4

(Dobong-gu) ← Suyu — Mia — Miasageori → (Seongbuk-gu)

- Ui LRT

Bukhansan Ui — Solbat Park — April 19th National Cemetery — Gaori — Hwagye — Samyang Sageori — Solsaem → (Seongbuk-gu)

== Notable people ==
- Baek Shin-ji
- Gong Ju-yeong

== Sister cities ==
=== Domestic ===
- Boseong, South Jeolla Province
- Dangjin, South Chungcheong Province
- Gimcheon, North Gyeongsang Province
- Goseong, Gangwon
- Yangpyeong, Gyeonggi Province

=== International ===
- Jiading District, Shanghai, China
- Tateyama, Toyama, Japan
- Dadong District, Shenyang, Liaoning, China
- Yogyakarta, Indonesia
- Chatham-Kent, Ontario, Canada
