= Songjung-dong =

- Interactive map of Songjung-dong
- Coordinates: 37°36′54″N 127°01′56″E
- Country: South Korea

Area
  - Total: 1.23 km^{2} (0.47 sq mi)

Population (2008)
  - Total: 36,412
  - Density: 30,343/km^{2} (78,590/sq mi)

Korean name
- Hangul: 송중동
- Hanja: 松中洞
- RR: Songjung-dong
- MR: Songjung-dong

Songjung-dong (Korean: 송중동) is a dong (neighbourhood) of Gangbuk District, Seoul, South Korea. From June 30, 2008, former Mia-4 and 9 dongs are combined for this dong.

== See also ==
- Administrative divisions of South Korea
