= Songcheon-dong =

- Interactive map of Songcheon-dong
- Country: South Korea

Area
  - Total: 16.93 km^{2} (6.54 sq mi)

Population (2008)
  - Total: 62,925
  - Density: 3,717/km^{2} (9,626/sq mi)

Korean name
- Hangul: 송천동
- Hanja: 松泉洞
- RR: Songcheon-dong
- MR: Songch'ŏn-dong

Songcheon-dong (Korean: 송천동) is a dong (neighbourhood) of Gangbuk District, Seoul, South Korea. On June 30, 2008, former Mia-5 and 8 dongs were combined to create this dong.

== Etymology ==
During the late Goryeo period, there was a belief that "the Lee family will establish their capital in Hanyang (Han Yang)." This belief spread through a book called "Seowungwanbigi" (書雲觀秘記). Upon hearing that the oak trees beneath Samgaksan Mountain in Hanyang were flourishing, it was considered an auspicious sign for the prosperity of the Lee family. Consequently, a team was sent to cut down these oak trees, and this place came to be known as "Beolli" (伐李), which later transformed into "Beolli" (번리). At that time, the natural village of Beondong was referred to as Upper Beolli, Middle Beolli, and Lower Beolli, depending on its location.

== See also ==
- Administrative divisions of South Korea
