= Samgaksan-dong =

- Interactive map of Samgaksan-dong
- Coordinates: 37°36′52″N 127°00′57″E
- Country: South Korea

Area
  - Total: 0.62 km^{2} (0.24 sq mi)

Population (2008)
  - Total: 26,097
  - Density: 42,092/km^{2} (109,020/sq mi)

Korean name
- Hangul: 삼각산동
- Hanja: 三角山洞
- RR: Samgaksan-dong
- MR: Samgaksan-dong

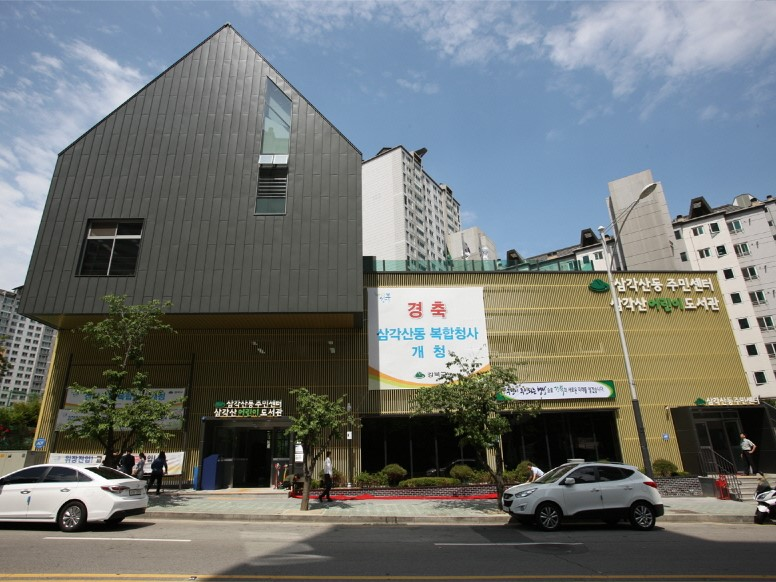
Samgaksan-dong Complex Government Building located in Samgaksan-dong, Gangbuk-gu, Seoul

Samgaksan-dong (Korean: 삼각산동) is a dong (neighbourhood) of Gangbuk District, Seoul, South Korea. On June 30, 2008, former Mia-6 and 7 dongs are combined for this dong.

== See also ==
- Administrative divisions of South Korea
