= Samyang-dong =

Coordinates: 33°32′N 126°36′E

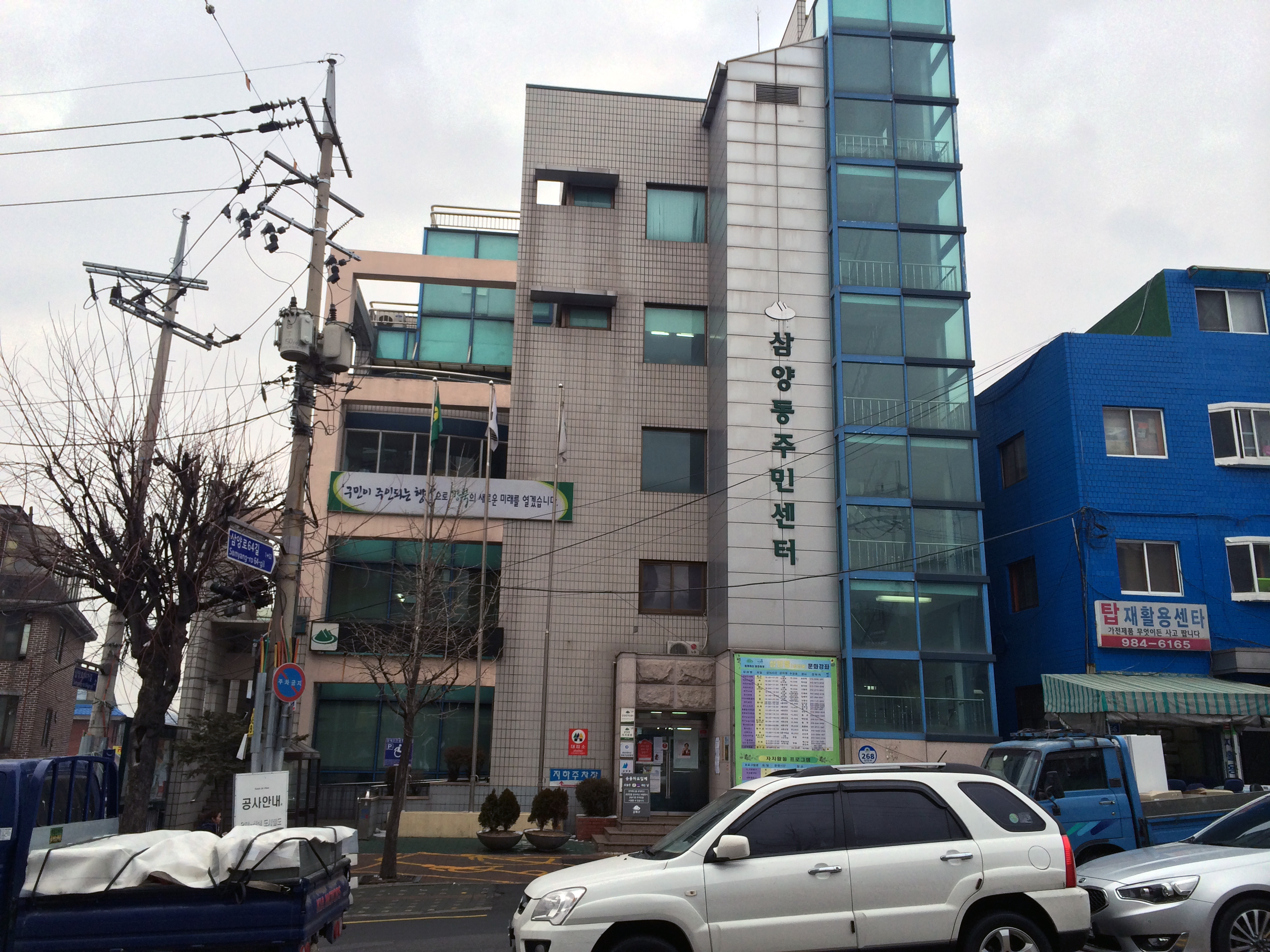
- Samyang-dong Community Service Center (Gangbuk-gu)
- Interactive map of Samyang-dong
- Country: South Korea

Area
  - Total: 9.52 km^{2} (3.68 sq mi)

Population (2008)
  - Total: 10,899
  - Density: 1,140/km^{2} (2,970/sq mi)

Korean name
- Hangul: 삼양동
- Hanja: 三陽洞
- RR: Samyang-dong
- MR: Samyang-dong

Samyang-dong (Korean: 삼양동) is a dong (neighbourhood) of Gangbuk District, Seoul, South Korea. On June 30, 2008, former Mia-1 and 2 dongs are combined for this dong.

== Origin ==
In 1949, when Miari was incorporated into the Seoul Metropolitan Government, district mayors gathered together and established an administrative neighborhood name with the meaning of "Neighborhood in the sunny south of Samgaksan Mountain."

== See also ==
- Administrative divisions of South Korea
