= Hoegi-dong =

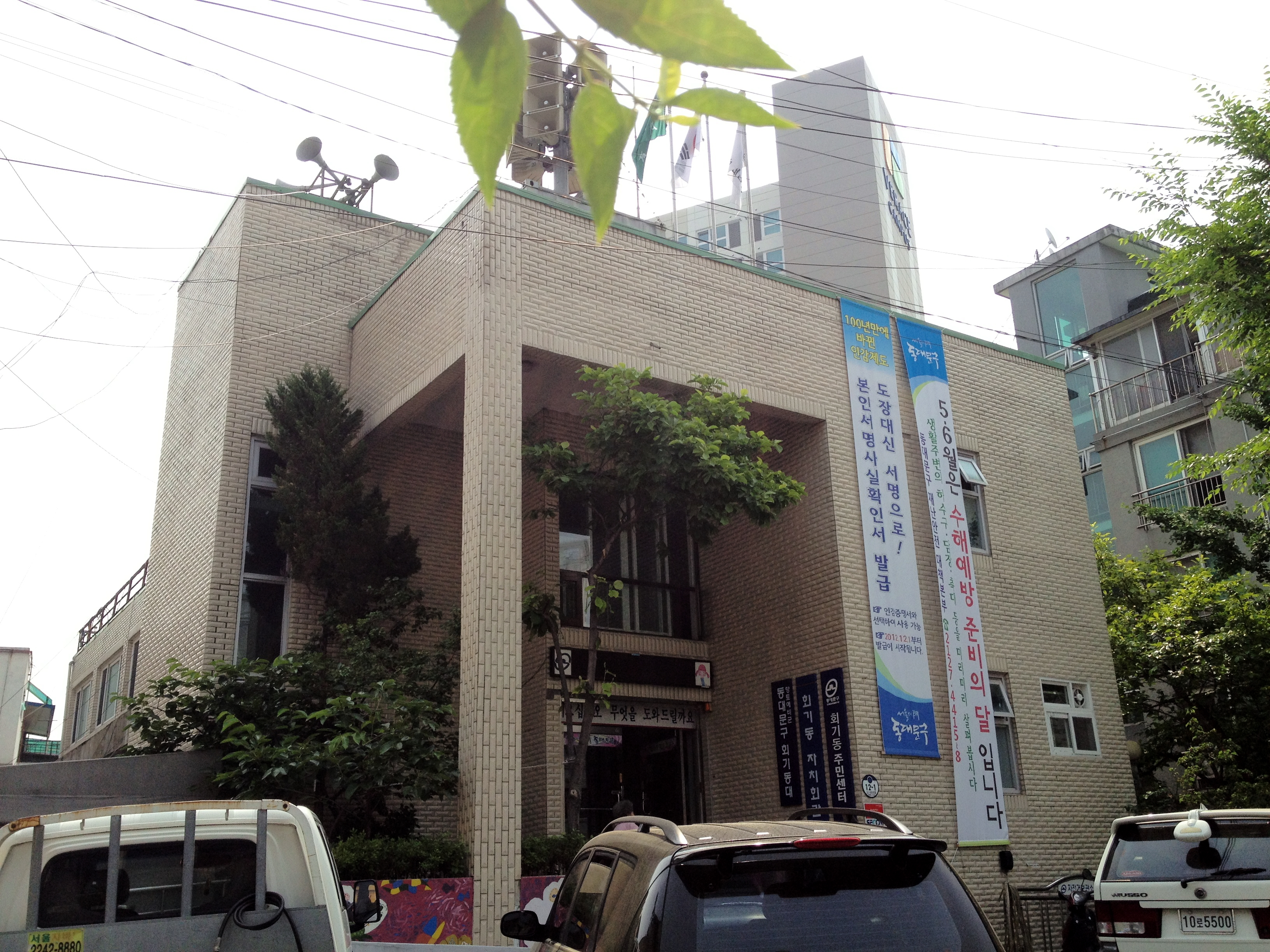
- Dongdaemun Hoegi-dong Community Service Center

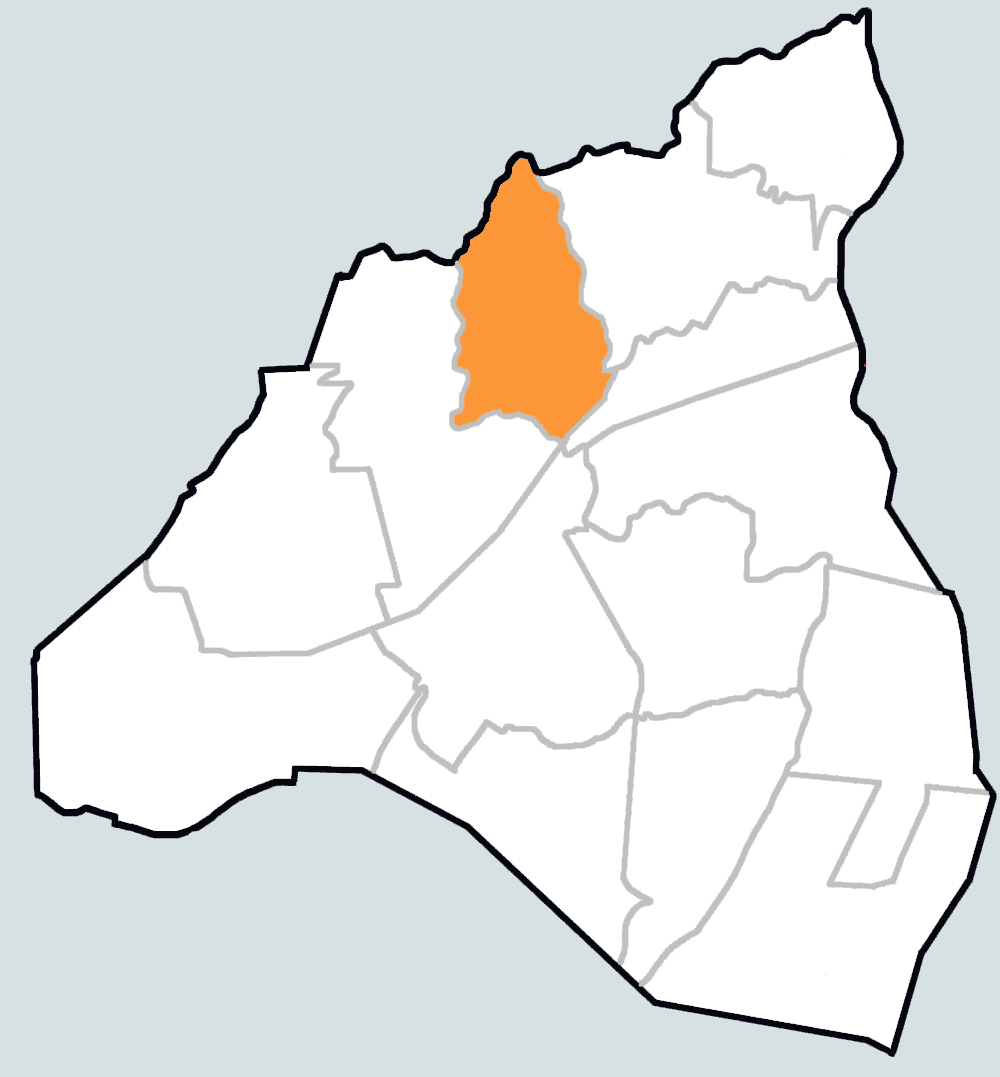
- Hoegi-dong in Dongdaemun District
- Country: South Korea

Area
  - Total: 0.76 km^{2} (0.29 sq mi)

Population (2013)
  - Total: 11,273
  - Density: 15,000/km^{2} (38,000/sq mi)

Korean name
- Hangul: 회기동
- Hanja: 回基洞
- RR: Hoegi-dong
- MR: Hoegi-dong

Hoegi-dong (Korean: 회기동) is a dong (neighborhood) of Dongdaemun District, Seoul, South Korea.

== Overview ==
Hoegi-dong is bordered by Cheongnyangni-dong to the east and south, Hwigyeong-dong to the west, and Imun-dong to the west. The neighborhood's name originates from Hoemyo (懷墓), the tomb of Lady Yun, the deposed queen and biological mother of King Yeonsangun of the Joseon Dynasty. The tomb was originally located on the site of the present-day Kyunghee Girls' Middle and High School, but in 1967, when Kyung Hee University relocated to the area, it was moved to Seosamneung in Goyang, Gyeonggi Province.

== See also ==
- Administrative divisions of South Korea
