= Yongsin-dong =

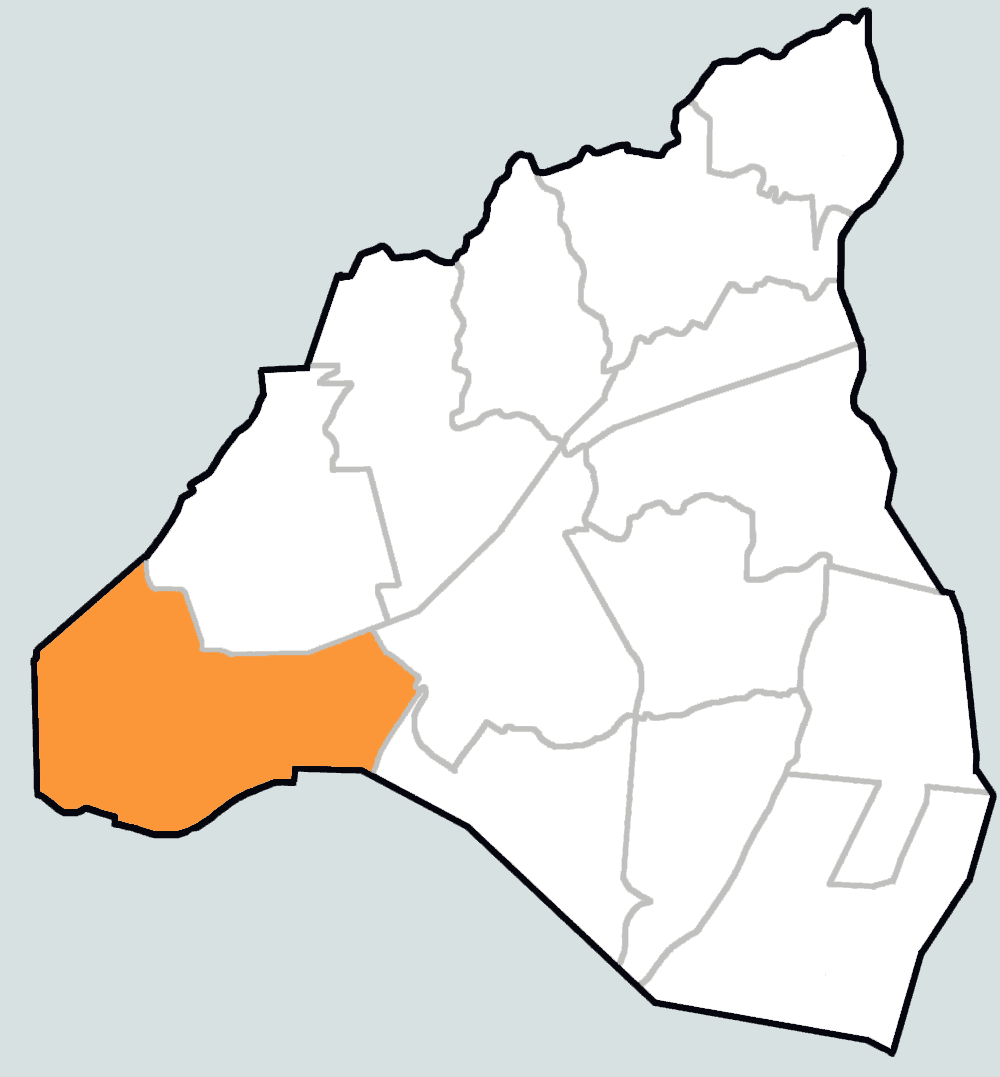
- Yongsin-dong in Dongdaemun District
- Coordinates: 37°34′22″N 127°01′54″E
- Country: South Korea

Area
  - Total: 1.61 km^{2} (0.62 sq mi)

Population (2013)
  - Total: 31,744
  - Density: 19,700/km^{2} (51,100/sq mi)

Korean name
- Hangul: 용신동
- Hanja: 龍新洞
- RR: Yongsin-dong
- MR: Yongsin-dong

Yongsin-dong (Korean: 용신동) is a dong (neighbourhood) of Dongdaemun District, Seoul, South Korea. It consists of the two legal dong Sinseol-dong and Yongdu-dong.

== Overview ==
Yongsin-dong is a neighborhood that was created on May 4, 2009, through the merger of Yongdu-dong and Sinseol-dong. Sinseol-dong is located at the westernmost part of Dongdaemun-gu. During the Joseon Dynasty, it was a newly established village in the Dongbu Sungshinbang area, originally called "Sinseol-gye" (Newly Established Village). During the Gabo Reform, it was renamed Sinseol-dong. Previously, the area was also known as "Saemal" or "Shinri" (New Village).

Yongdu-dong borders Sinseol-dong along Wangsan-ro and Cheonho-daero. Its name comes from the shape of the mountain behind the village, which resembles a dragon's head, leading to the original names "Yongmeori" or "Yongduri" (Dragon Head Village). In 1894, during the Gabo Reform, Hanseongbu established Yongdu-ri in Inchangbang (outside the city). In 1911, it was renamed Yongdu-ri, Inchang-myeon, Hanseongbu, and on June 11, 1943, it was incorporated into Dongdaemun-gu during the district reorganization. On April 18, 1955, with the implementation of the neighborhood system, it was divided into Yongdu 1-dong and Yongdu 2-dong offices, and then on August 11, 2008, it was merged back into Yongdu-dong.

On May 4, 2009, it merged with Sinseol-dong to form Yongsin-dong. Later, the local government consulted residents about separating Yongdu-dong and Sinseol-dong into separate administrative neighborhoods again. Starting in July 2025, it was decided that Yongdu-dong and Sinseol-dong would be administratively separated, and accordingly, Yongsin-dong as an administrative neighborhood was officially abolished on June 30, 2025.

== See also ==
- Administrative divisions of South Korea
