= Jeonnong-dong =

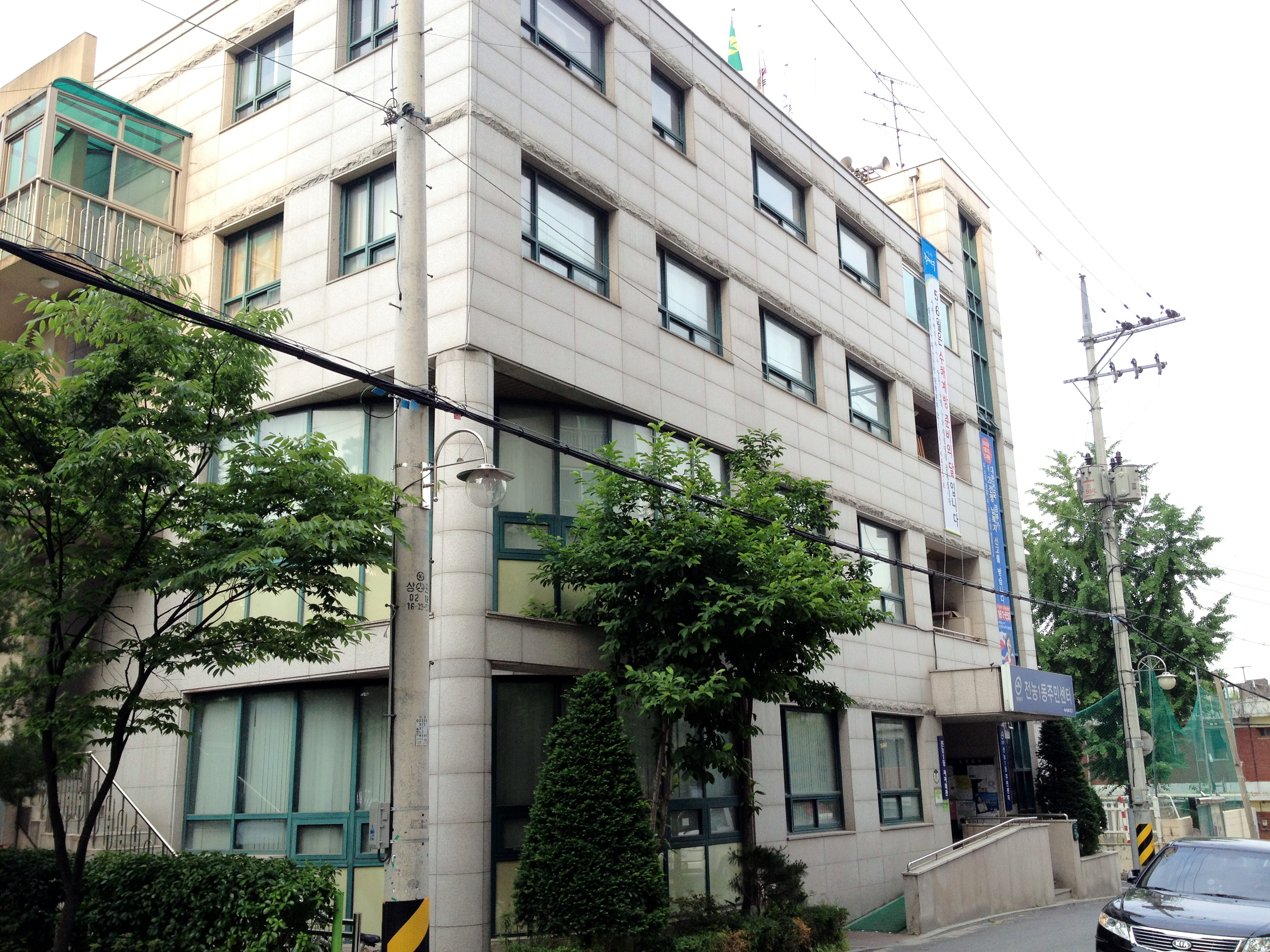
- Dongdaemun Jeonnong 1-dong Community Service Center

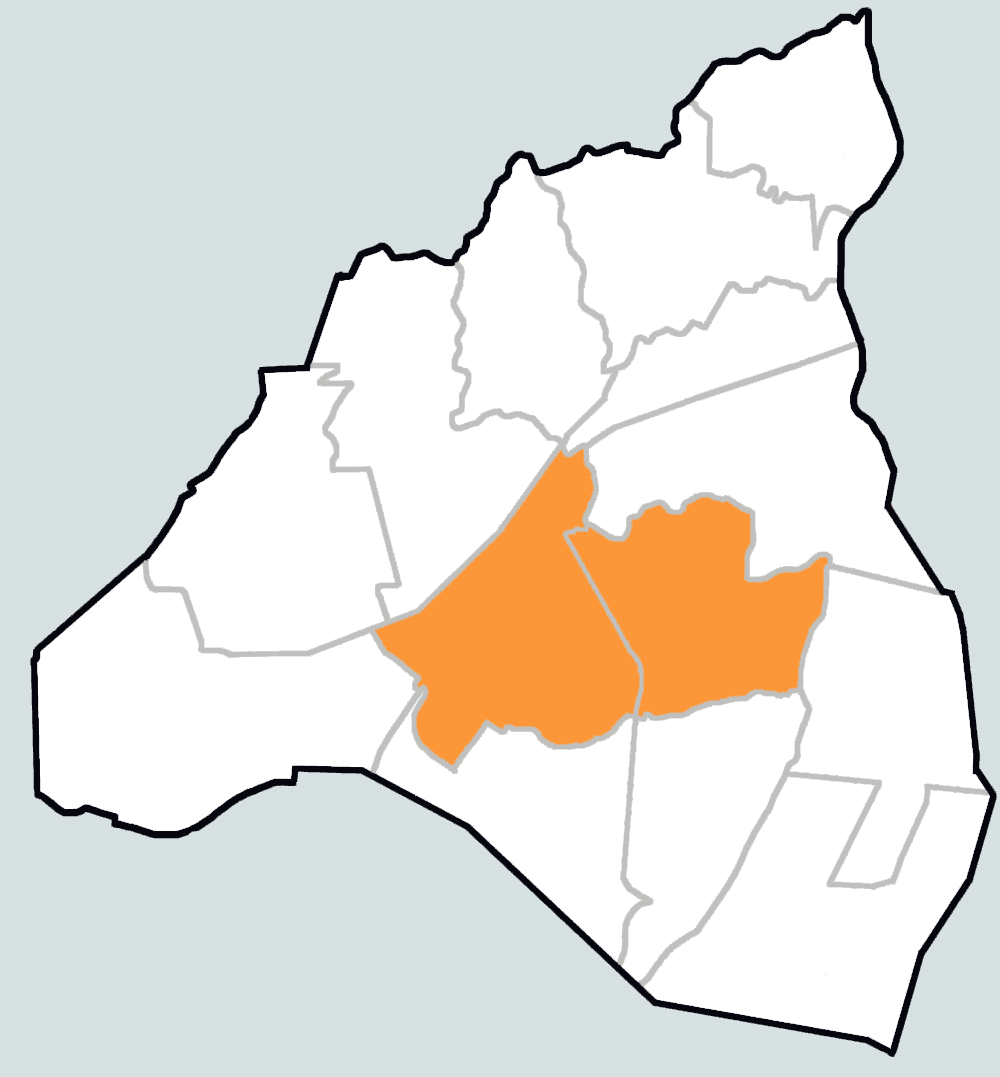
- Jeonnong-dong in Dongdaemun District
- Country: South Korea

Area
  - Total: 1.99 km^{2} (0.77 sq mi)

Population (2013)
  - Total: 53,311
  - Density: 26,800/km^{2} (69,400/sq mi)

Korean name
- Hangul: 전농동
- Hanja: 典農洞
- RR: Jeonnong-dong
- MR: Chŏnnong-dong

Jeonnong-dong (Korean: 전농동) is a dong (neighbourhood) of Dongdaemun District, Seoul, South Korea. It is home to the University of Seoul.

== Overview ==
Jeonnong-dong is located behind Cheongnyangni station. It was named Jeonnong-ri because, from the early Joseon period, the area was associated with agriculture, which was highly valued, and it contained the royal agricultural fields known as Jeokjeon (籍田) or Jeonnong (典農), directly managed by the king.

In the early Joseon period, Jeonnong-dong belonged to Dongbu Inchangbang of Hanseong-bu. During the Gabo Reform, it was recorded as Dongso-gye Jeonnong-ri in Inchangbang (outside the city) of East and West Hanseong-bu. On April 1, 1911, it was referred to as Jeonnong-ri, Inchang-myeon, Gyeongseong-bu. On April 1, 1914, it was incorporated into Goyang-gun, Gyeonggi-do, as Jeonnong-ri, Sungin-myeon, but on April 1, 1936, with the expansion of Gyeongseong-bu, it became Jeonnong-jeong of Gyeongseong-bu. On April 1, 1943, with the implementation of the district system, it was placed under Dongdaemun-gu.

After Korea's liberation, on October 1, 1946, Japanese-style place names were replaced with Korean names, and it reverted to Jeonnong-dong, which it remains today. In 1955, it was divided into Jeonnong 1-dong and 2-dong. On October 31, 1959, due to administrative changes, Jeonnong 3-dong was split again. On May 18, 1970, Jeonnong 4-dong was separated, and on May 4, 2009, the name of Jeonnong 3-dong was changed to Jeonnong 2-dong.

== See also ==
- Administrative divisions of South Korea
