= Janghanpyeong station =

Train station in South Korea

장한평; Janghanpyeong
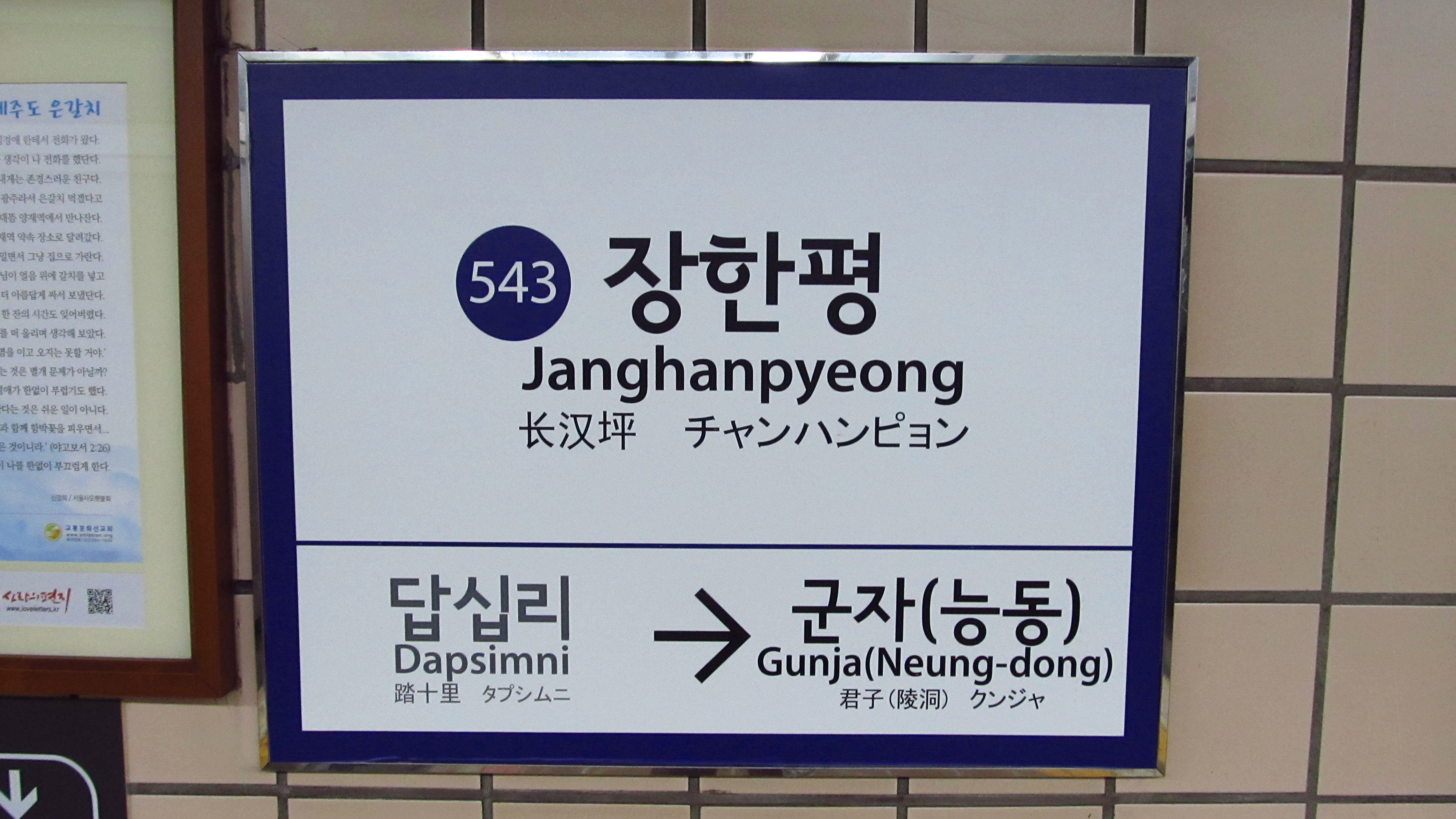

Korean name
- Hangul: 장한평역
- Hanja: 長漢坪驛
- Revised Romanization: Janghanpyeongnyeok
- McCune–Reischauer: Changhanp'yŏngnyŏk

General information
- Location: 416 Jangan-dong, 405 Cheonhodaero Jiha, Dongdaemun-gu, Seoul
- Coordinates: 37°33′42″N 127°03′49″E
- Operator: Seoul Metro
- Line: Line 5
- Platforms: 1
- Tracks: 2

Construction
- Structure type: Underground

History
- Opened: November 15, 1995

Services
Preceding station	Seoul Metropolitan Subway	Following station
Dapsimni towards Banghwa	Line 5	Gunja towards Hanam Geomdansan or Macheon
Location

Janghanpyeong Station is a station on Seoul Subway Line 5 in Dongdaemun District, Seoul.

== Station layout ==
G	Street level	Exit

L1; Concourse	Lobby	Customer Service, Shops, Vending machines, ATMs

L2; Platform	Westbound	← Line 5 toward Banghwa (Dapsimni)
L2; Platform	Island platform, doors will open on the left
L2; Platform	Eastbound	Line 5 toward Hanam Geomdansan or Macheon (Gunja)→
