= Dapsimni station =

Train station in South Korea

답십리; Dapsimni
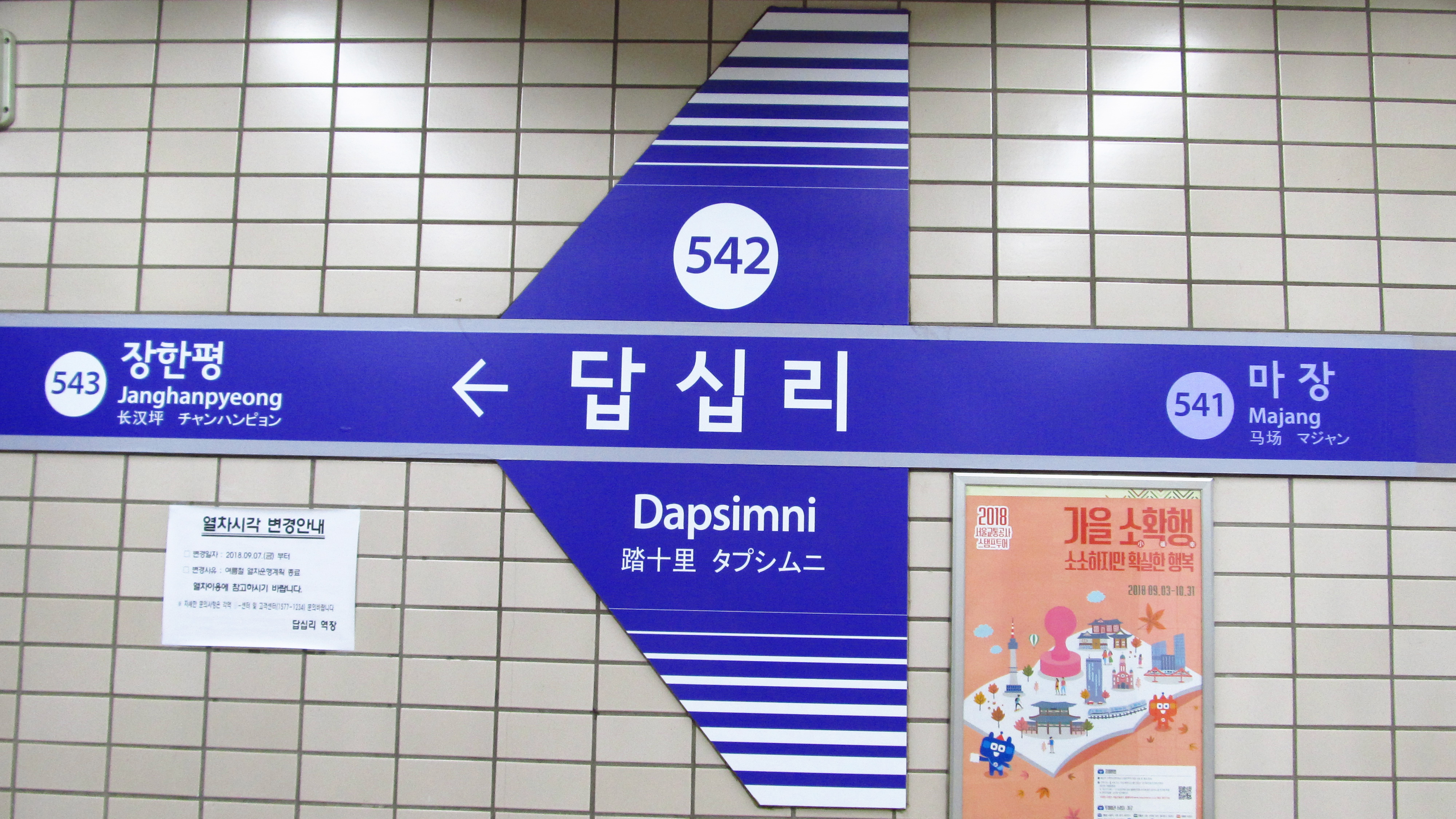

Korean name
- Hangul: 답십리역
- Hanja: 踏十里驛
- Revised Romanization: Dapsimni-yeok
- McCune–Reischauer: Tapsimni-yŏk

General information
- Location: 524-1 Dapsimni-dong, 300 Cheonhodaero Jiha, Dongdaemun-gu, Seoul
- Coordinates: 37°34′01″N 127°03′09″E
- Operator: Seoul Metro
- Line: Line 5
- Platforms: 2
- Tracks: 2

Construction
- Structure type: Underground

History
- Opened: November 15, 1995

Services
Preceding station	Seoul Metropolitan Subway	Following station
Majang towards Banghwa	Line 5	Janghanpyeong towards Hanam Geomdansan or Macheon
Location

Dapsimni Station is a station on the Seoul Subway Line 5 in Dongdaemun District, Seoul.

== Station layout ==
G	Street level	Exit

L1; Concourse	Lobby	Customer Service, Shops, Vending machines, ATMs

L2; Platforms	Side platform, doors will open on the right
L2; Platforms	Westbound	← Line 5 toward Banghwa (Majang)
L2; Platforms	Eastbound	Line 5 toward Hanam Geomdansan or Macheon (Janghanpyeong)→
L2; Platforms	Side platform, doors will open on the right
