= Jegi-dong station =

Train station in South Korea

Coordinates: 37°34′40″N 127°02′05″E

제기동 (한국건강관리협회); Jegi-dong (Korea Association of Health Promotion)
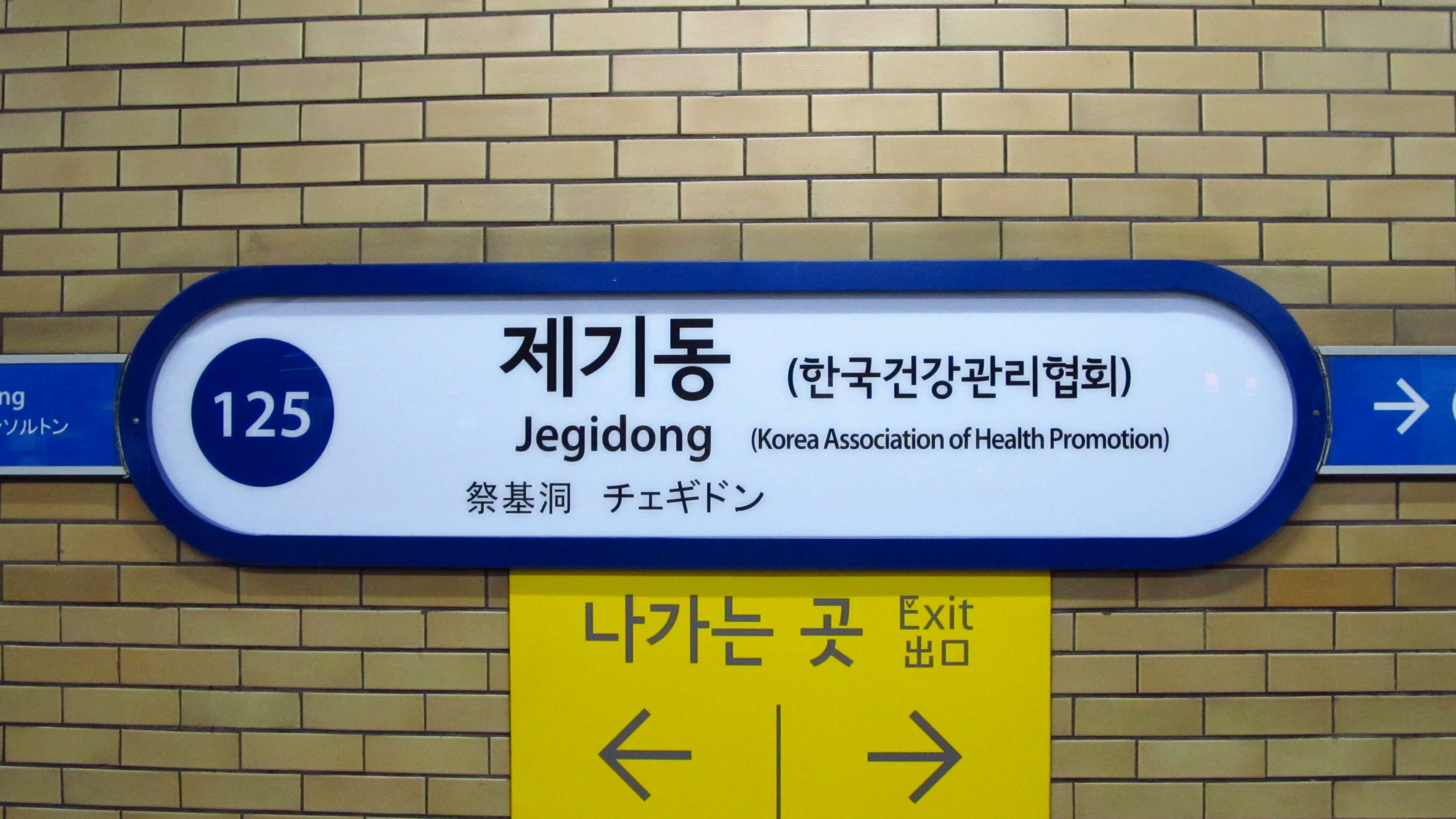
- Station Sign

Korean name
- Hangul: 제기동역
- Hanja: 祭基洞驛
- Revised Romanization: Jegidongnyeok
- McCune–Reischauer: Chegidongnyŏk

General information
- Location: 51 Jegi-dong, 93 Wangsanno Jiha, Dongdaemun-gu, Seoul
- Operator: Seoul Metro
- Line: Line 1
- Platforms: 2
- Tracks: 2

Construction
- Structure type: Underground

History
- Opened: August 15, 1974
- Former names: Seongdong

Passengers
- (Daily) Based on Jan-Dec of 2012. Line 1: 38,845
Services
Preceding station	Seoul Metropolitan Subway	Following station
Cheongnyangni towards Kwangwoon University or Yeoncheon	Line 1	Sinseol-dong towards Incheon, Seodongtan or Sinchang
Cheongnyangni towards Dongducheon	Line 1 Gyeongwon Express	Sinseol-dong towards Incheon
Cheongnyangni Terminus	Line 1 Gyeongbu Express	Sinseol-dong towards Sinchang
Location

Jegi-dong Station is a station on Line 1 on the Seoul Subway network.

This station is very close to the site of the former Seongdong Station, the original western terminus of the Gyeongchun Line from 1939 to 1971. Only a moments walk from the station is Gyeongdong Market, a large, well known medicinal market, and the Seoul Yangnyeongsi Herb Medicine Museum, a free museum dedicated to educating visitors about traditional Korean medicine.

== Station layout ==
G	Street level	Exit

L1; Concourse	Lobby	Customer Service, Shops, Vending machines, ATMs

L2; Platforms	Side platform, doors will open on the left
L2; Platforms	Southbound	Line 1 toward Incheon, Seodongtan or Sinchang (Sinseol-dong) →
L2; Platforms	Northbound	← Line 1 toward Kwangwoon University or Yeoncheon (Cheongnyangni)
L2; Platforms	Side platform, doors will open on the left
