= Jegi =

Jegi or JEGI may refer to:

- Jegi, an item used in the Korean game of Jegichagi
- Jegi-dong, a neighborhood of Seoul, Korea
