= Yongdu station =

Station of the Seoul Metropolitan Subway

용두 (동대문구청); Yongdu (Dongdaemun-gu Office)
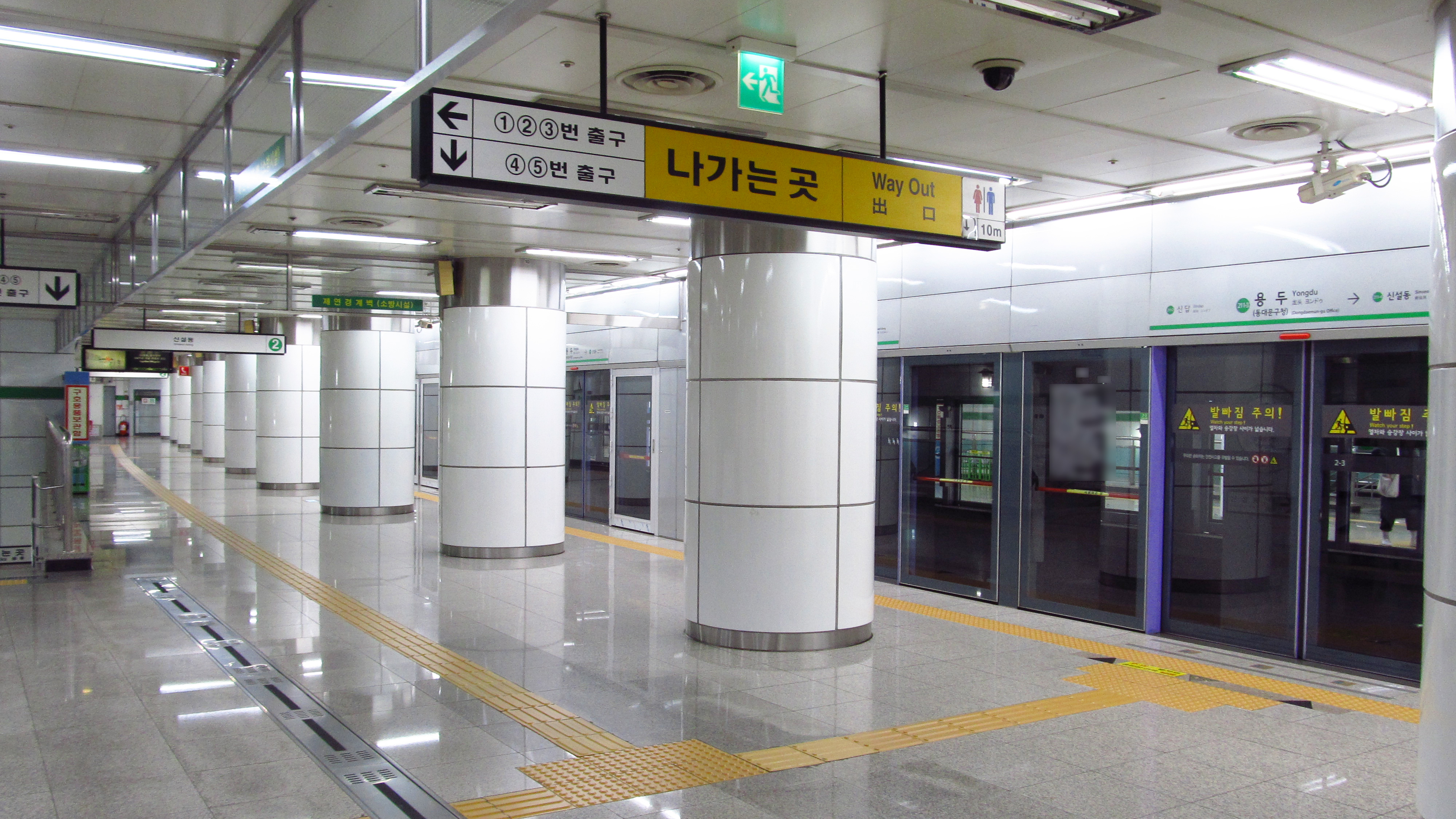
- Station Platform

Korean name
- Hangul: 용두역
- Hanja: 龍頭驛
- Revised Romanization: Yongdu-yeok
- McCune–Reischauer: Yongdu-yŏk

General information
- Location: 47-1 Yongdu-dong, Cheonhodaero Jiha 129, Dongdaemun-gu, Seoul
- Coordinates: 37.57400°N 127.03807°E
- Operated by: Seoul Metro
- Line: Line 2
- Platforms: 2
- Tracks: 2

Construction
- Structure type: Underground

History
- Opened: October 20, 2005

Passengers
- (Daily) Based on Jan-Dec of 2012. Line 2: 4,625

Services
Preceding station	Seoul Metropolitan Subway	Following station
Sindap towards Seongsu	Line 2 Seongsu Branch	Sinseol-dong Terminus
Location

Yongdu Station is a station on the Seongsu Branch of the Seoul Subway Line 2. It is located in Yongdu-dong, Dongdaemun-gu, Seoul. The name of the station means "dragon head".

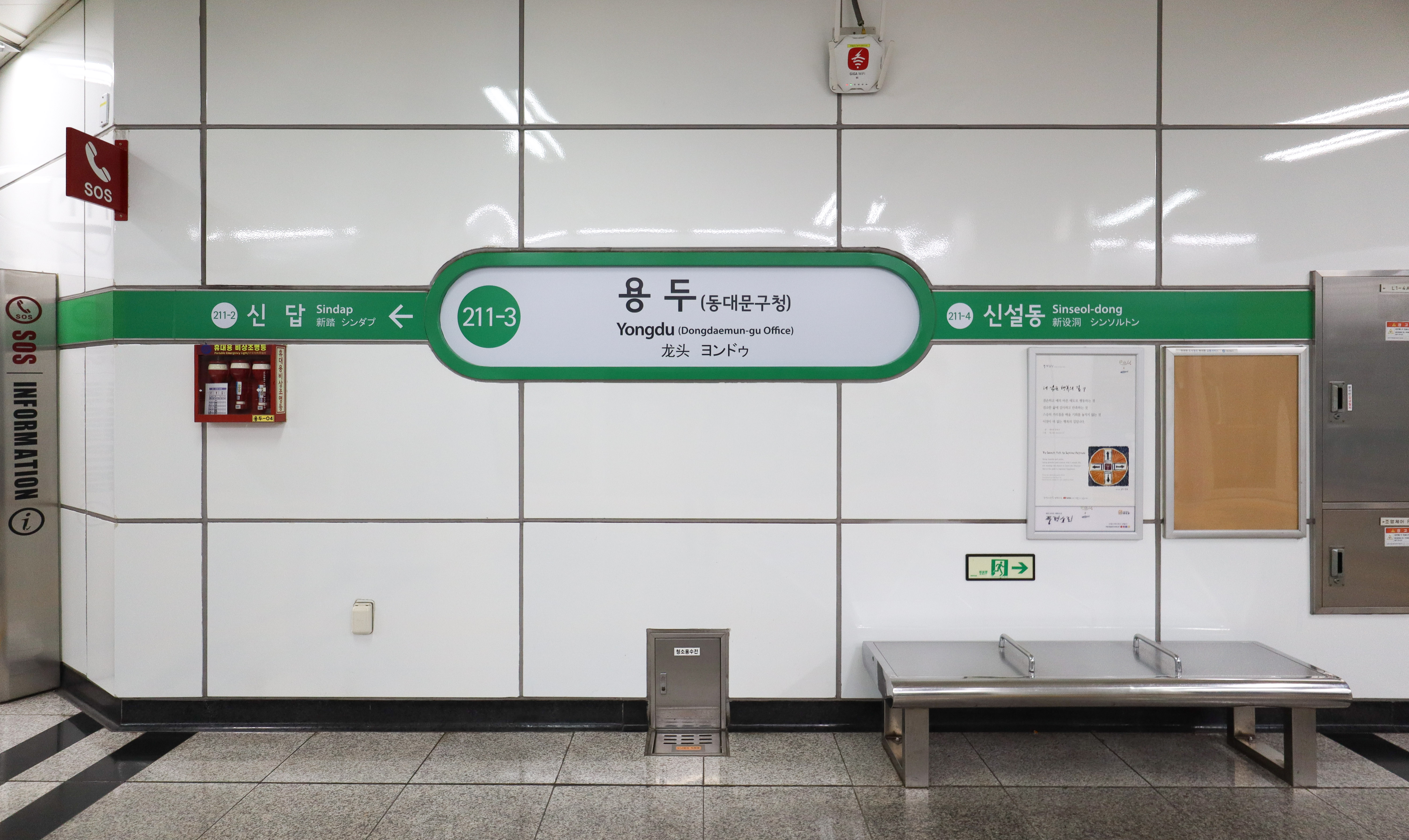

== Neighborhoods ==
- Dongdaemun-gu office
- Cheonggyecheon
