= Sinseol-dong =

- Neighbourhood
- Country: South Korea

Area
  - Total: 0.56 km^{2} (0.22 sq mi)

Population (2001)
  - Total: 8,829
  - Density: 16,000/km^{2} (41,000/sq mi)

Korean name
- Hangul: 신설동
- Hanja: 新設洞
- RR: Sinseol-dong
- MR: Sinsŏl-tong

Sinseol-dong (Korean: 신설동) is a dong, legal neighbourhood, of Dongdaemun District, Seoul, South Korea.

== Overview ==
Sinseol-dong is located at the westernmost part of Dongdaemun District. During the Joseon Dynasty, it was a newly established village within Dongbusungsinbang (崇信坊), and for that reason, it was called Sinseolgye (新設契, "newly established community"). During the Gabo Reform period, it came to be known as Sinseol-dong. In the past, the area was also referred to as Saemal ("new village") or Sin-ri (新里).

In 1914, it became Sinseol-ri of Sungin-myeon, Goyang County, and in 1936, it was reincorporated into Gyeongseong-bu.

On June 11, 1943, with the implementation of the district system, it was incorporated into Dongdaemun District. On April 18, 1955, Bomun-dong 1–7-ga were separated from it.

In 2009, Sinseol-dong merged with Yongdu-dong to form the integrated administrative dong of Yongshin-dong. Later, on July 1, 2025, it was separated again and reestablished as the administrative dong of Sinseol-dong.

== Attractions ==
- Seoul Folk Flea Market (re-opening on 26 April 2008) - it was featured in episode 39 of popular SBS program Running Man on 17 April 2011.

== See also ==
- Administrative divisions of South Korea
