= Dapsimni-dong =

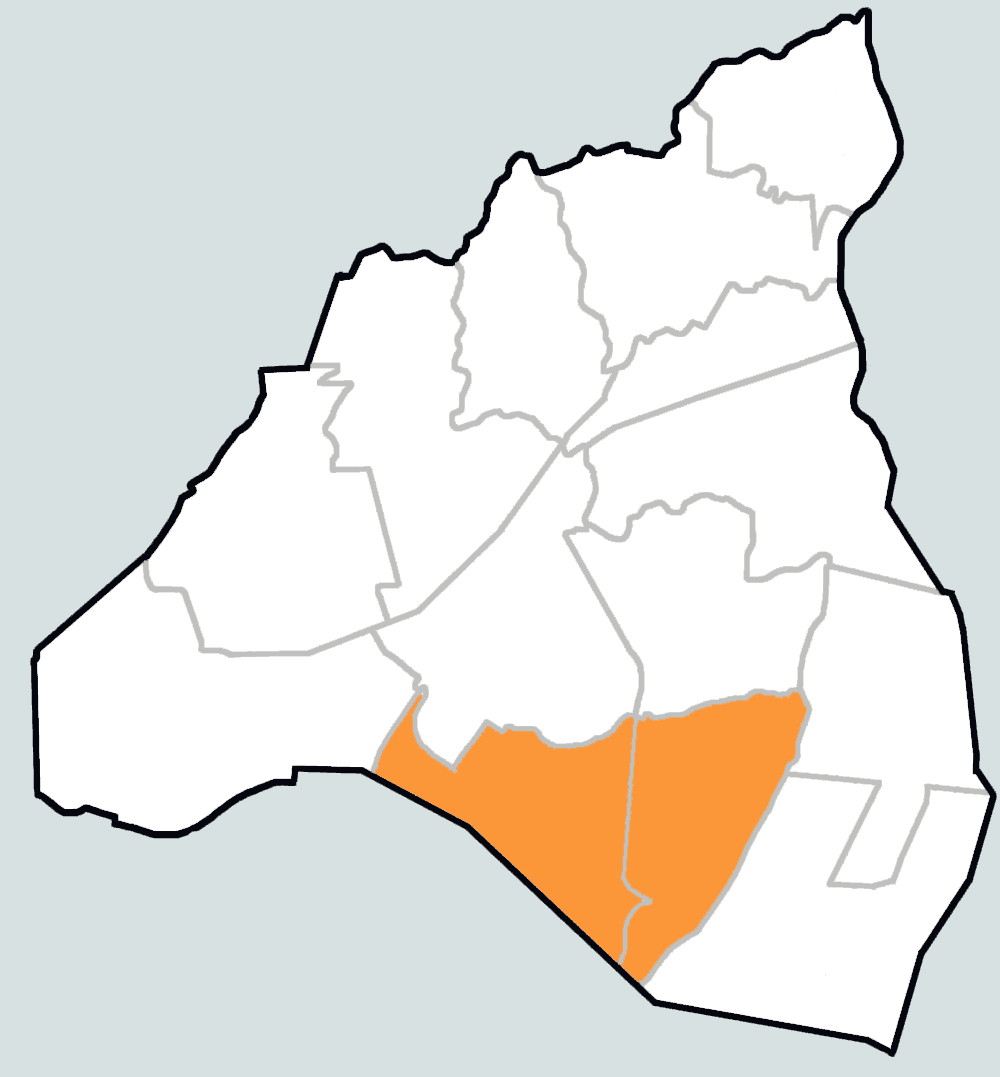
- Dapsimni-dong in Dongdaemun District
- Country: South Korea

Area
  - Total: 1.72 km^{2} (0.66 sq mi)

Population (2013)
  - Total: 51,324
  - Density: 29,800/km^{2} (77,300/sq mi)

Korean name
- Hangul: 답십리동
- Hanja: 踏十里洞
- RR: Dapsimni-dong
- MR: Tapsimni-dong

Dapsimni-dong (Korean: 답십리동) is a dong (neighborhood) of Dongdaemun District, Seoul, South Korea.

== History ==
There are several theories regarding the origin of the name Dapsimni. One explanation is that in the early Joseon period, the monk Muhak stepped onto this area while seeking a site for the new capital, leading to the name Dapsimni (踏尋里). Another theory suggests that, like Wangsimni, it was called Dapsimni because it was located ten ri from Heunginjimun. A third theory holds that, since this area was part of the lower reaches of the Cheonggyecheon and its fields (畓) were said to be as wide as ten ri, the name evolved into Dapsimni (畓 → 踏十里).

In 1751, the 27th year of King Yeongjo’s reign, this area was part of Dapsimni-gye in Inchangbang of the Eastern District of Hansungbu. In April 1911, it was incorporated into Inchang-myeon of Gyeongseongbu, and in April 1914, it became part of Sunguin-myeon in Goyang-gun, Gyeonggi Province. In April 1936, it was designated as Dapsimni-jeong of Gyeongseongbu, and when the district system was introduced on April 1, 1943, it was incorporated into Dongdaemun District and renamed Dapsimni-jeong, Dongdaemun-gu. After liberation, on October 1, 1946, the Japanese-style suffix “jeong” was removed, and the name was changed to Dapsimni-dong, Dongdaemun-gu.

On May 18, 1970, Dapsimni 3-dong of Dongdaemun-gu was newly established. On August 11, 2008, Dapsimni 3-dong and 5-dong were merged, and on May 4, 2009, 1-dong and 3-dong were consolidated, leaving only two administrative dong.

== See also ==
- Administrative divisions of South Korea
