= Dongdaemun District =

District of Seoul, South Korea

Dongdaemun
- Autonomous District
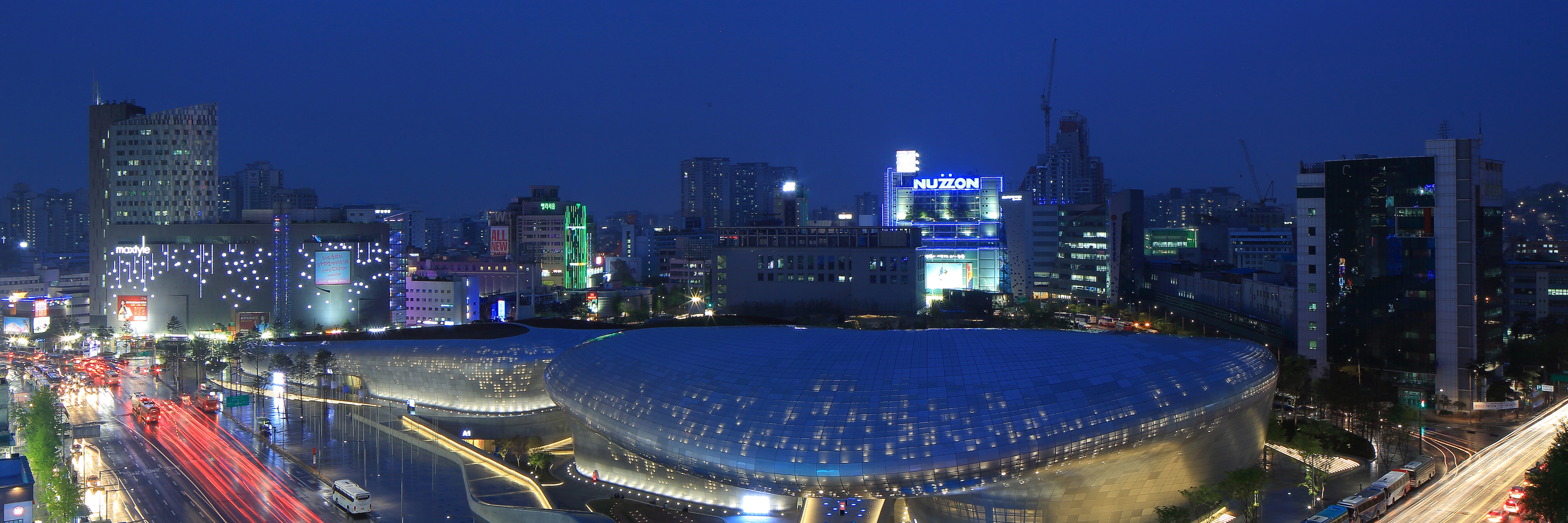
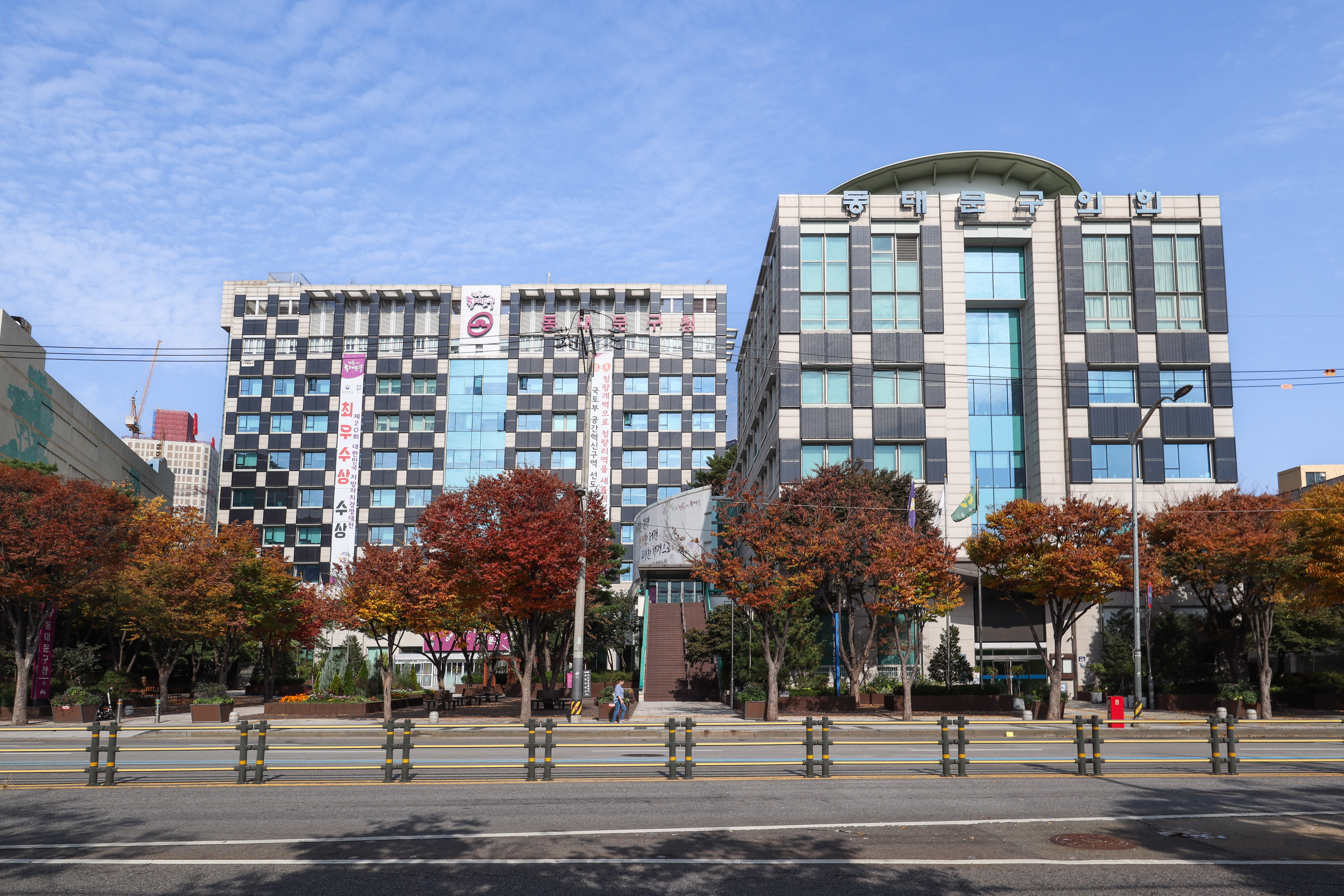
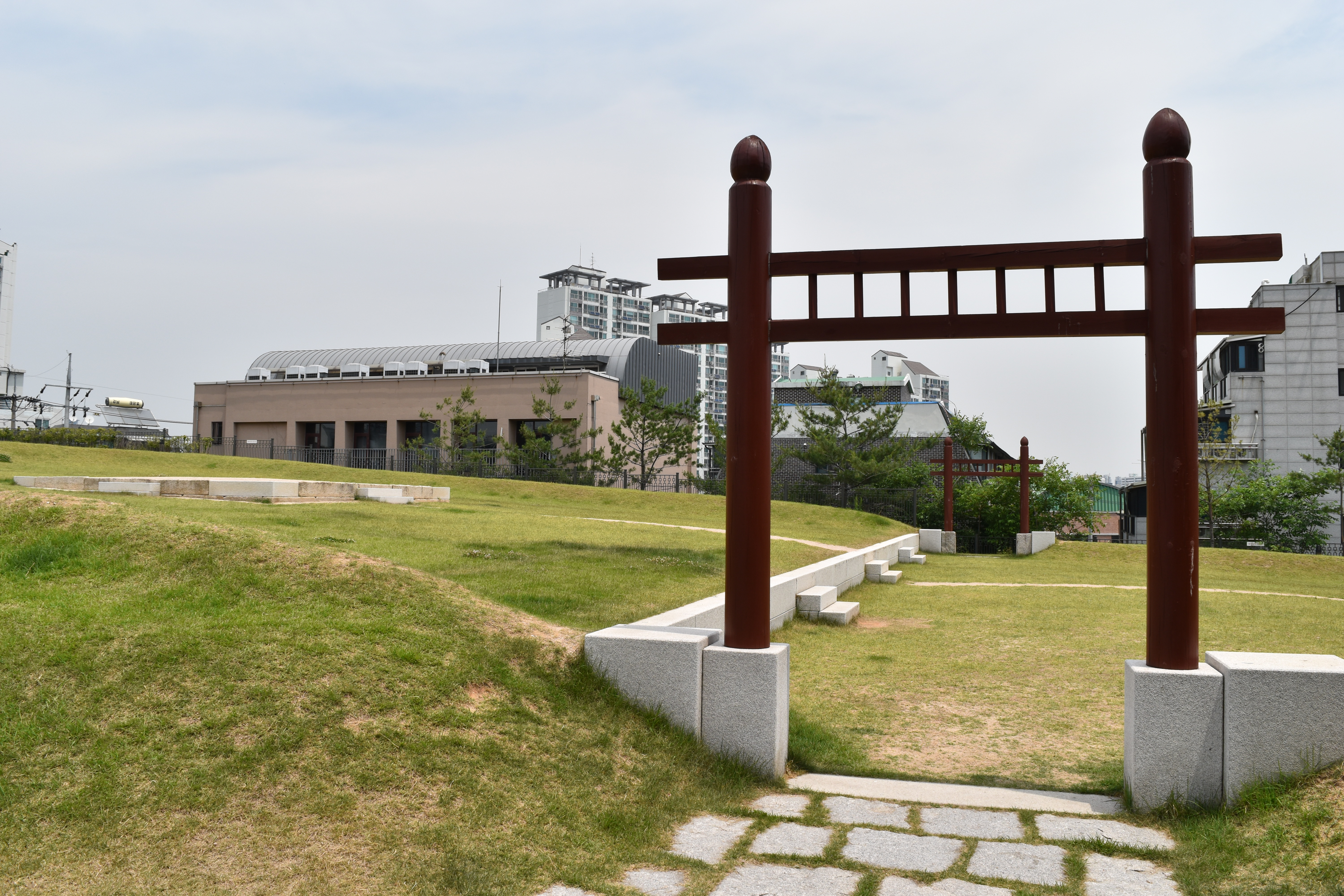
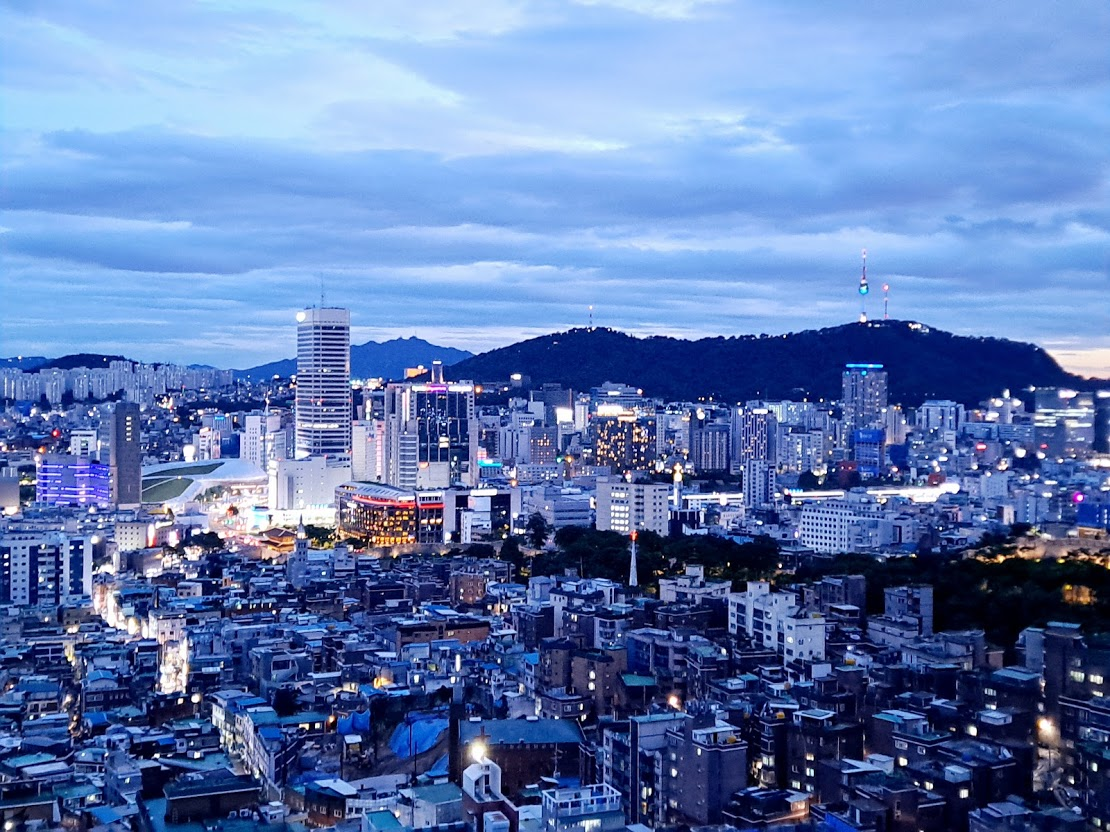
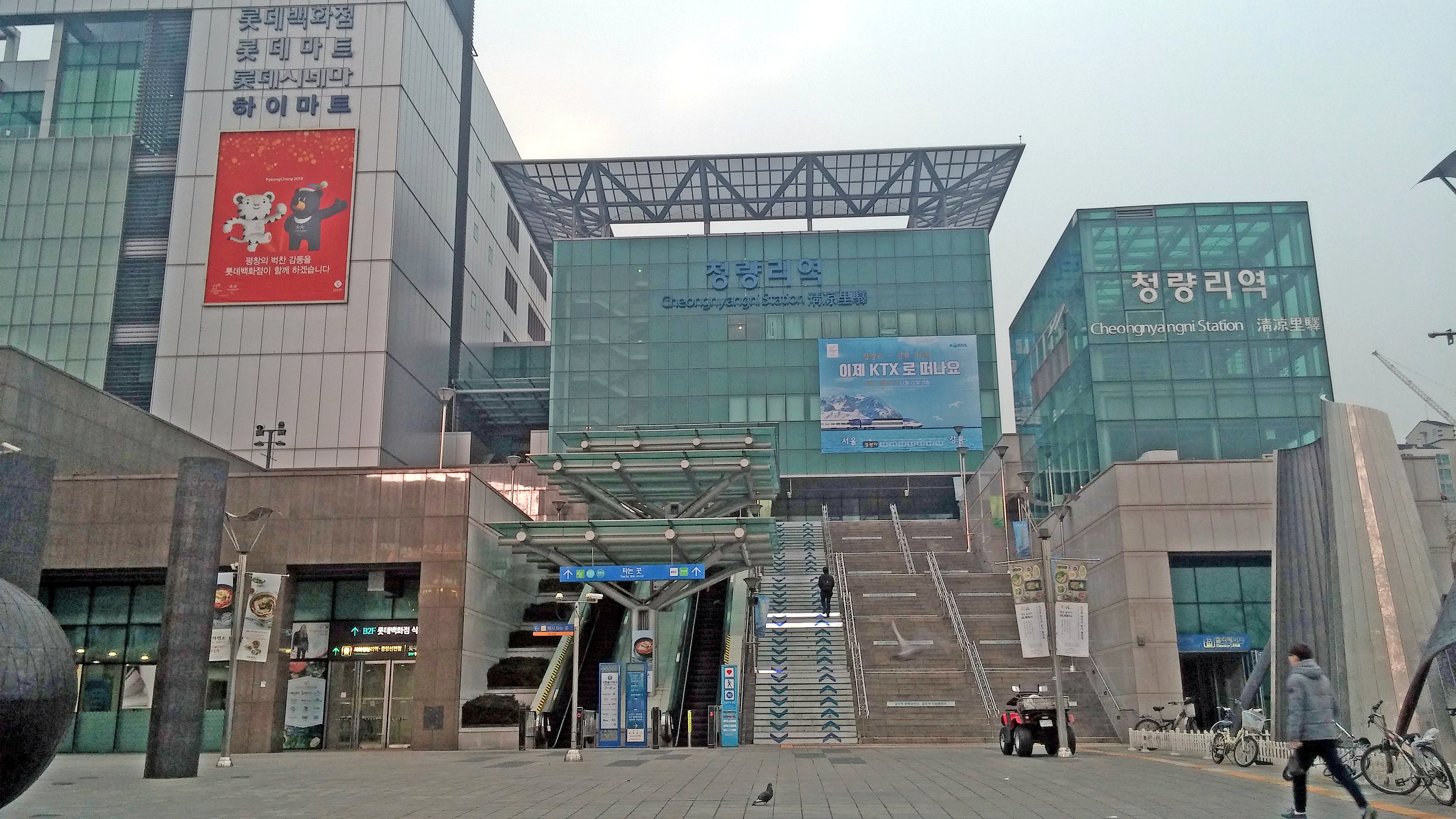
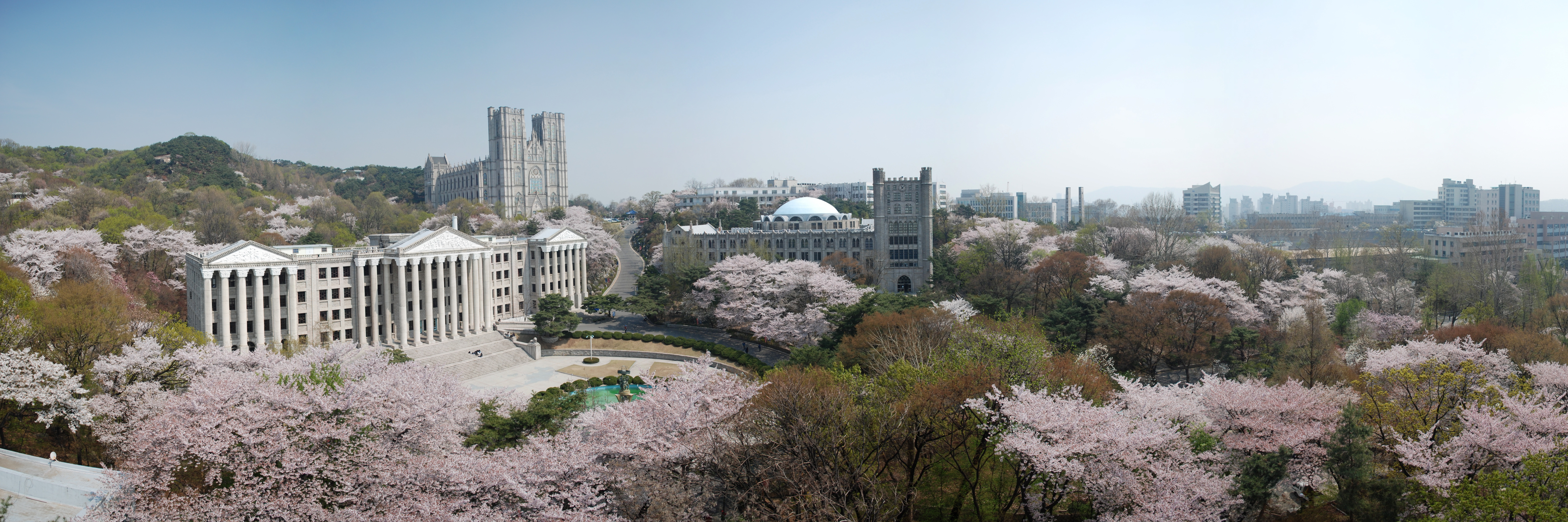
- Dongdaemun Design Plaza District Office Seonnongdan Altar Dongdaemun cityscape Cheongnyangni Station Kyung Hee University Seoul Campus

- Flag

- Location of Dongdaemun District in Seoul
- Interactive map of Dongdaemun
- Coordinates: 37.5710°N 127.0097°E
- Country: South Korea
- Region: Sudogwon
- Special City: Seoul
- Administrative dong: 14

Government
  - Body: Dongdaemun-gu Council
  - Mayor: Choi Dong-min (Democratic)
  - MNAs: List of MNAs: Ahn Gyu-back (Democratic); Jang Kyung-tae (Democratic)

Area
  - Total: 14.22 km^{2} (5.49 sq mi)

Population (September 2024)
  - Total: 340,686
  - Density: 23,960/km^{2} (62,050/sq mi)
- Time zone: UTC+9 (Korea Standard Time)
- Postal code.: 02400~02699
- Area code: 02-900,2200
- Website: District Government

Korean name
- Hangul: 동대문구
- Hanja: 東大門區
- RR: Dongdaemun-gu
- MR: Tongdaemun-gu

Dongdaemun District (Korean: 동대문구) is one of the 25 districts of Seoul, South Korea. It has a population of 346,770 (2010) and has a geographic area of 14.22 km^{2} (5.49 sq mi), and is divided into 14 dong (administrative neighborhoods). Dongdaemun is located in northeastern Seoul, bordering the city districts of Seongbuk to the northwest, Jongno to the west, Seongdong to the south, Gwangjin to the southeast, and Jungnang to the east.

Dongdaemun is part of the Seongjeosimni (Outer old Seoul) area and is named after Heunginjimun, one of the Eight Gates of Seoul which is not located within the district. Dongdaemun is home to the University of Seoul, Cheongnyangni station, and to Gyeongdong Market, one of the largest herbal medicine and agricultural markets in South Korea.

Yoo Deok-yeol (유덕열) of the Democratic Party has been the mayor of Dongdaemun since July 2010.

== History ==
Dongdaemun District was first created in 1943 when the "gu" system started and was larger in area than it is today. Seongbuk District separated from the district in 1949, and Changsin Dong and Sungin Dong were given to Jongno District in 1975. An additional 17 dong (neighborhoods) separated to become Jungnang District in 1988.

== Administrative divisions ==
Administrative divisions

Dongdaemun District currently comprises 14 dongs.

- Cheongnyangni-dong
- Dapsimni 1-dong
- Dapsimni 2-dong
- Hoegi-dong
- Hwigyeong 1-dong
- Hwigyeong 2-dong
- Imun 1-dong
- Imun 2-dong
- Jangan 1-dong
- Jangan 2-dong
- Jegi-dong
- Jeonnong 1-dong
- Jeonnong 2-dong
- Yongsin-dong

== Transportation ==
=== Subway ===
- Korail and Seoul Metro
  - Subway Line 1
    - (Jongno-gu) ← Sinseol-dong — Jegi-dong — Cheongnyangni — Hoegi — Hankuk University of Foreign Studies — Sinimun → (Seongbuk-gu)
- Seoul Metro
  - Subway Line 2
    - (Seongdong-gu) → Yongdu − Sinseol-dong
- Seoul Metropolitan Rapid Transit Corporation
  - Subway Line 5
    - (Seongdong-gu) ← Dapsimni — Janghanpyeong → (Gwangjin-gu)
- Korail
  - Jungang Section Line from Yongsan to Paldang
    - (Seongdong-gu) ← Cheongnyangni (aboveground) — Hoegi → (Jungnang-gu)

There are more stations will add.

== Geography ==
Dongdaemun District borders Seongbuk District to the north-west, Jungnang District to the east (with the Jungnangcheon stream forming the border), Gwangjin District to the south-east, Seongdong District to the south, meets Jung District at a point in the south-west and borders Jongno District to the west. The busiest neighborhood of the district is the Cheongnyangni area - a large commercial zone formed around Cheongnyangni Station, one of the secondary CBDs of Seoul. Dongdaemun District is named after the east gate in Seoul's city walls, Dongdaemun, but Dongdaemun itself is actually located in Jongno District. This is due to an administrative border change.

== Education ==
=== Universities ===
- University of Seoul
- Kyunghee University
- Hankuk University of Foreign Studies

=== Research ===
- Korea Institute for Advanced Study

== Attractions ==
- Gyeongdong Market
- Dongseo Market
- King Sejong Memorial
- Seoul City Cultural Asset: Seonnongdan (선농단 先農壇), King Sejong Sindobi (세종대왕신도비 世宗大王神道碑, monumental stone)
- National Treasure: Supyo (수표 水標)
- Historical Site: Yeonghuiwon (영휘원永徽園)

The grave sites of Kim Byeongro (김병로 金炳魯), Han Yongwoon (한용운 韓龍雲), Ahn Changho and Oh Sechang (오세창 吳世昌) are also located in this district.

== Sister cities ==
- Anguo, China
- Yanqing, China
- Shanghai, China
- New York City, United States
- Los Angeles, United States
- Paris, France
- Lyon, France
- London, England
