= Jegi-dong =

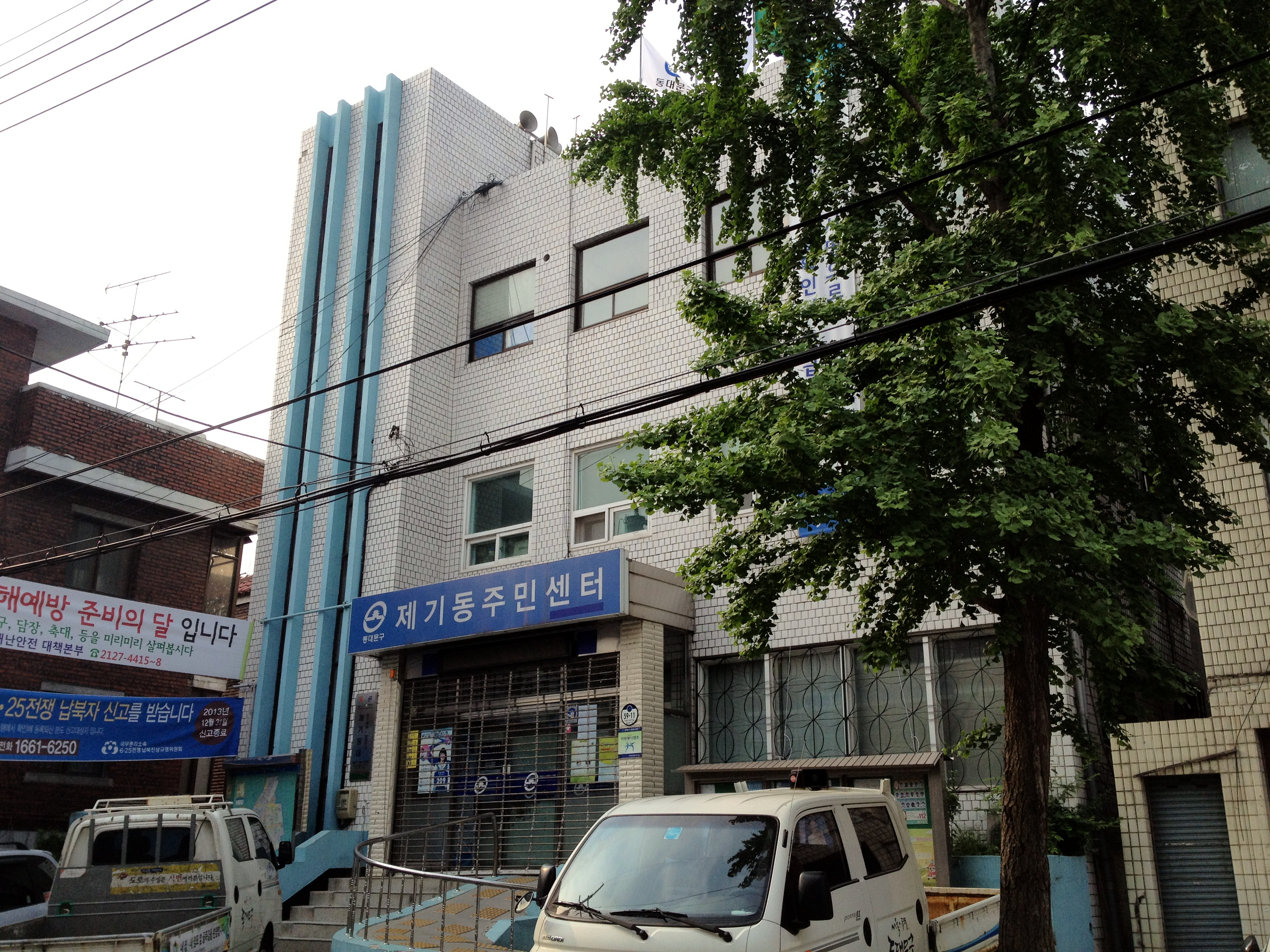
- Dongdaemun Jegi-dong Community Service Center

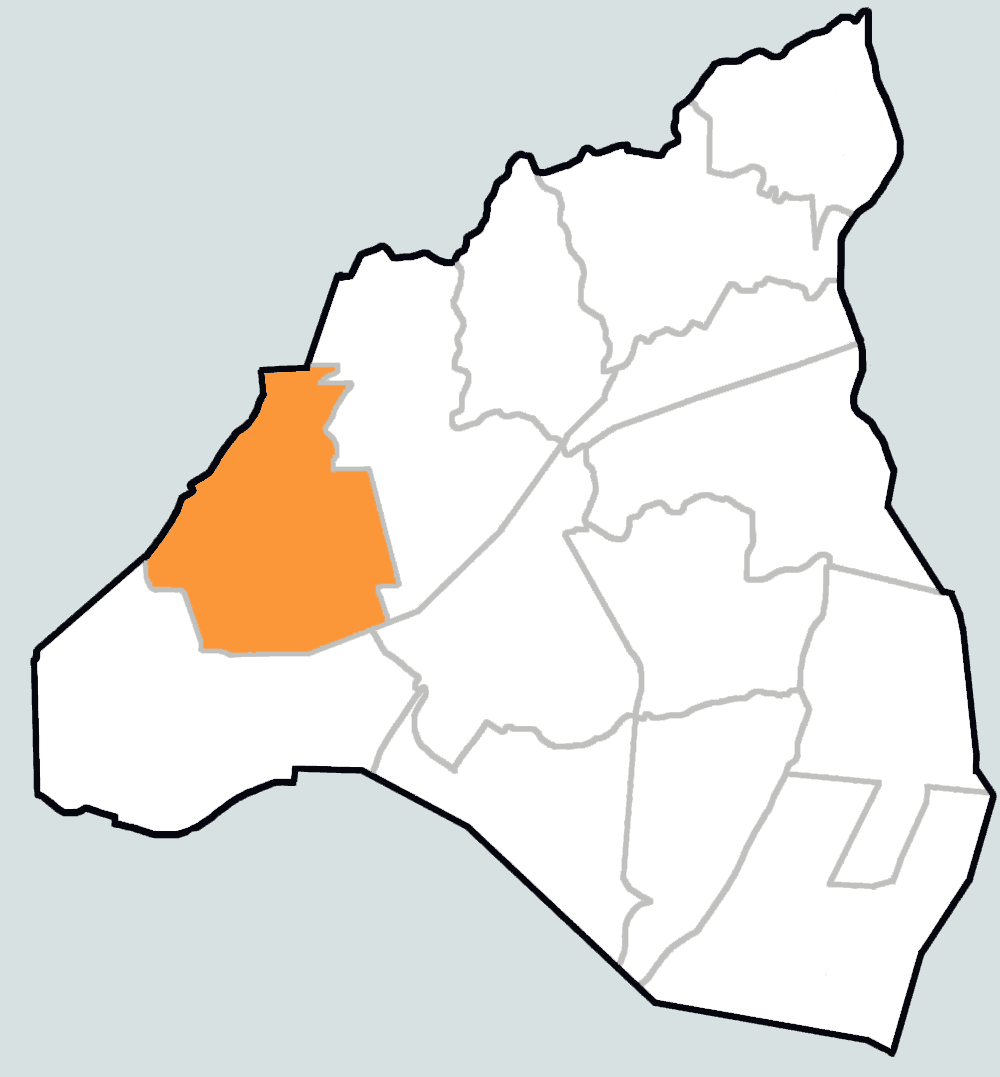
- Jegi-dong in Dongdaemun District
- Coordinates: 37°34′51″N 127°02′11″E
- Country: South Korea

Area
  - Total: 1.17 km^{2} (0.45 sq mi)

Population (2013)
  - Total: 27,560
  - Density: 23,600/km^{2} (61,000/sq mi)

Korean name
- Hangul: 제기동
- Hanja: 祭基洞
- RR: Jegi-dong
- MR: Chegi-dong

Jegi-dong (Korean: 제기동) is a dong (neighborhood) of Dongdaemun District, Seoul, South Korea.

== Overview ==
Jegi-dong is an area of Dongdaemun District. It is known for its traditional markets, Gyeongdong Market and Dongseo Market. You can find a wide variety of dried herbs and substances used for Korean traditional medicine.

Near exit 2 of Jegi-dong station, there are a variety of buffet style restaurants. Patrons are able to purchase a filling meal for prices that range from 6900 won for pork to 9500 won for beef. Some restaurants also include a serving of bulgogi in the allotted price.

== See also ==
- Administrative divisions of South Korea
