= Imun-dong =

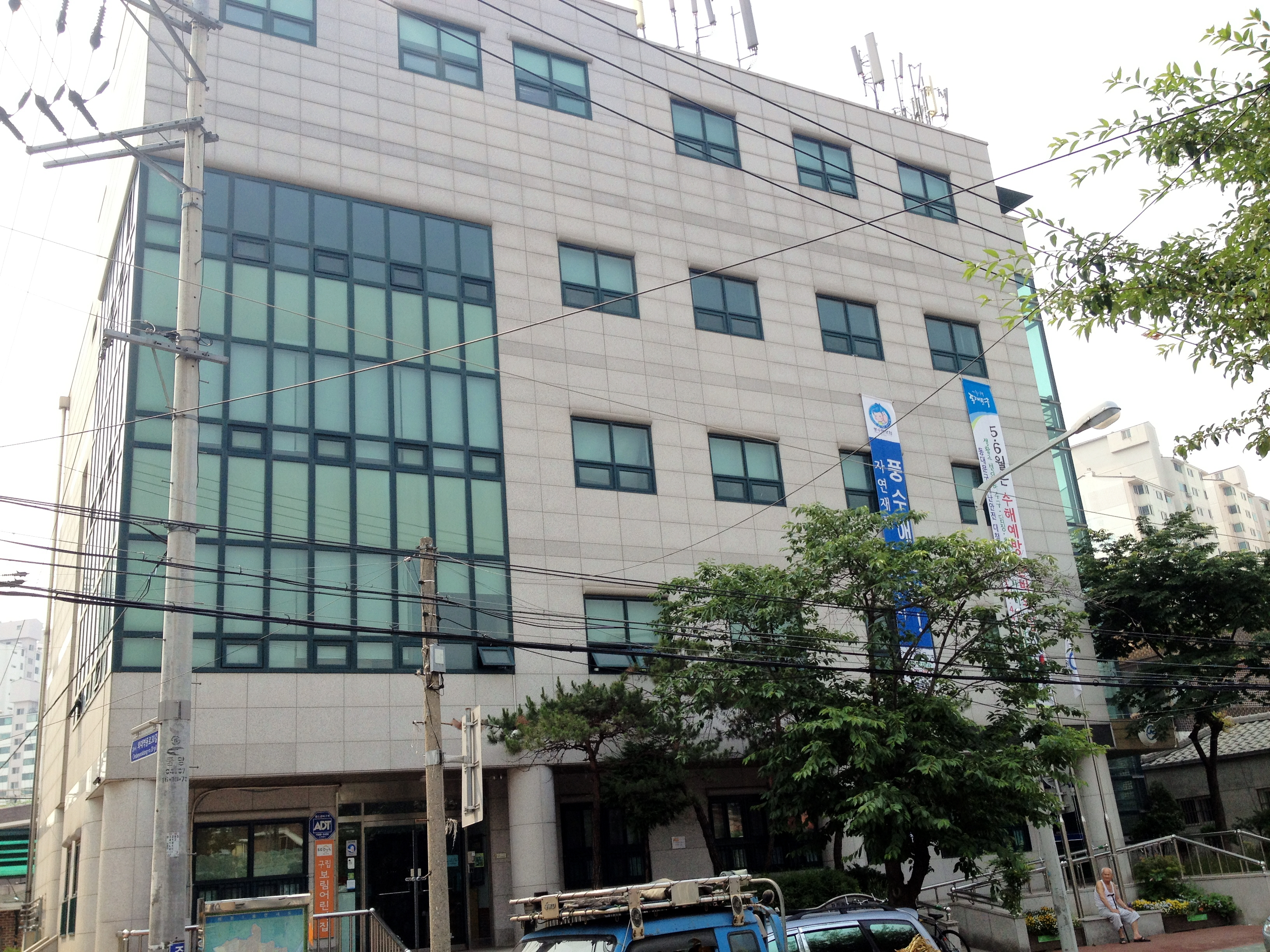
- Dongdaemun Imun 1-dong Community Service Center

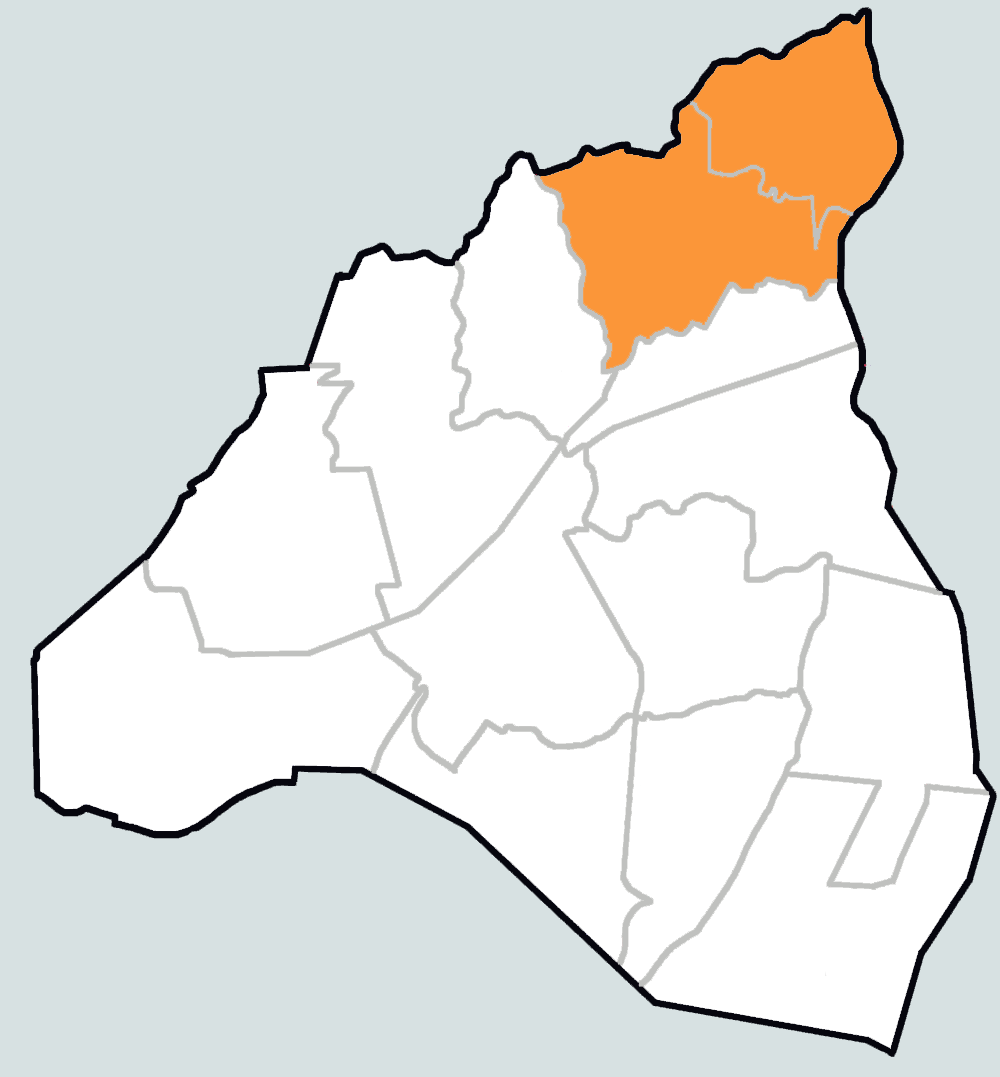
- Imun-dong in Dongdaemun District
- Country: South Korea

Area
  - Total: 1.76 km^{2} (0.68 sq mi)

Population (2013)
  - Total: 53,929
  - Density: 30,600/km^{2} (79,400/sq mi)

Korean name
- Hangul: 이문동
- Hanja: 里門洞
- RR: Imun-dong
- MR: Imun-dong

Imun-dong (Korean: 이문동) is a dong (neighborhood) of Dongdaemun District, Seoul, South Korea.

== Overview ==
Imundong got its name because, during the Joseon Dynasty, there was an imun (里門) here, which served a role similar to a modern security post. An imun can be compared to a city gate or the main gate of a private house. It was installed as a village gate at the entrance of small streets or alleys that led from a main road into the village.

During the Joseon Dynasty, imun were part of national security measures. They were first installed in Hanyang (modern-day Seoul) in 1465, the 11th year of King Sejo’s reign, and were implemented nationwide at the same time.

During the Gabo Reform in 1894, the area was called Imundong, referring to the outer part of the East Gate (Dongso-mun) in Inchangbang. On April 1, 1911, with the implementation of the 5-bu 8-myeon (district and township) system, it was called Imundong of Inchang-myeon, Gyeongseong-bu, Gyeonggi-do. On April 1, 1914, following the reduction of Gyeongseong-bu, it became Imundong of Sungin-myeon, Goyang-gun, Gyeonggi-do.

On April 1, 1936, with the expansion of Gyeongseong-bu and the incorporation of the area, it was renamed Imunjeong (里門町). In 1943, with the introduction of a new administrative system, it became part of Dongdaemun-gu.

After liberation, on October 1, 1946, the Japanese-style name Imunjeong was restored to Imundong. On May 18, 1970, Imundong was divided into Imun 1-dong, 2-dong, and 3-dong. On May 4, 2009, Imun 1-dong and 2-dong were merged into Imun 1-dong, and Imun 3-dong was renamed Imun 2-dong.

== See also ==
- Administrative divisions of South Korea
