= Gyeongdong Market =

Market in Seoul, South Korea

Coordinates: 37.581°N 127.037°E

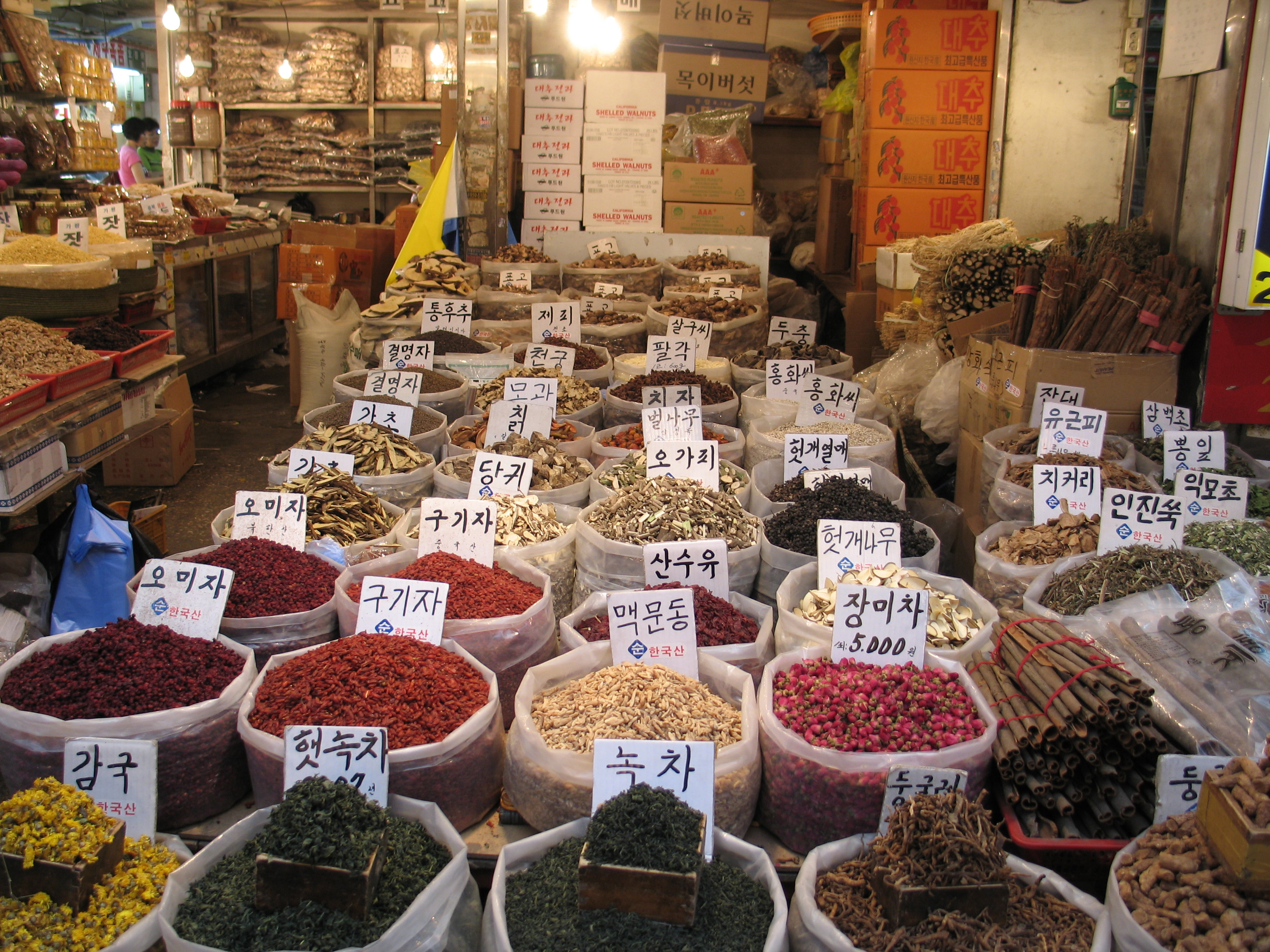

Korean name
- Hangul: 경동시장
- Hanja: 京東市場
- RR: Gyeongdong sijang
- MR: Kyŏngdong sijang

Gyeongdong Market (Korean: 경동시장), sometimes Kyungdong Market, located in Dongdaemun District, Seoul, is one of the largest herbal medicine and ginseng markets of South Korea. Since its establishment in 1960, the market supplies 70 percent of the nation's herbal medicine ingredients and has more than 1,000 related shops and oriental medicine clinics in the area. Gyeongdong Market also serves as a wholesale and retail markets selling agricultural products and fish in about 300,000 square meters, about five times the size of the Seoul Sangam World Cup Stadium.

It is served by Seoul Subway's Jegi-dong Station on Line 1.

== Gallery ==
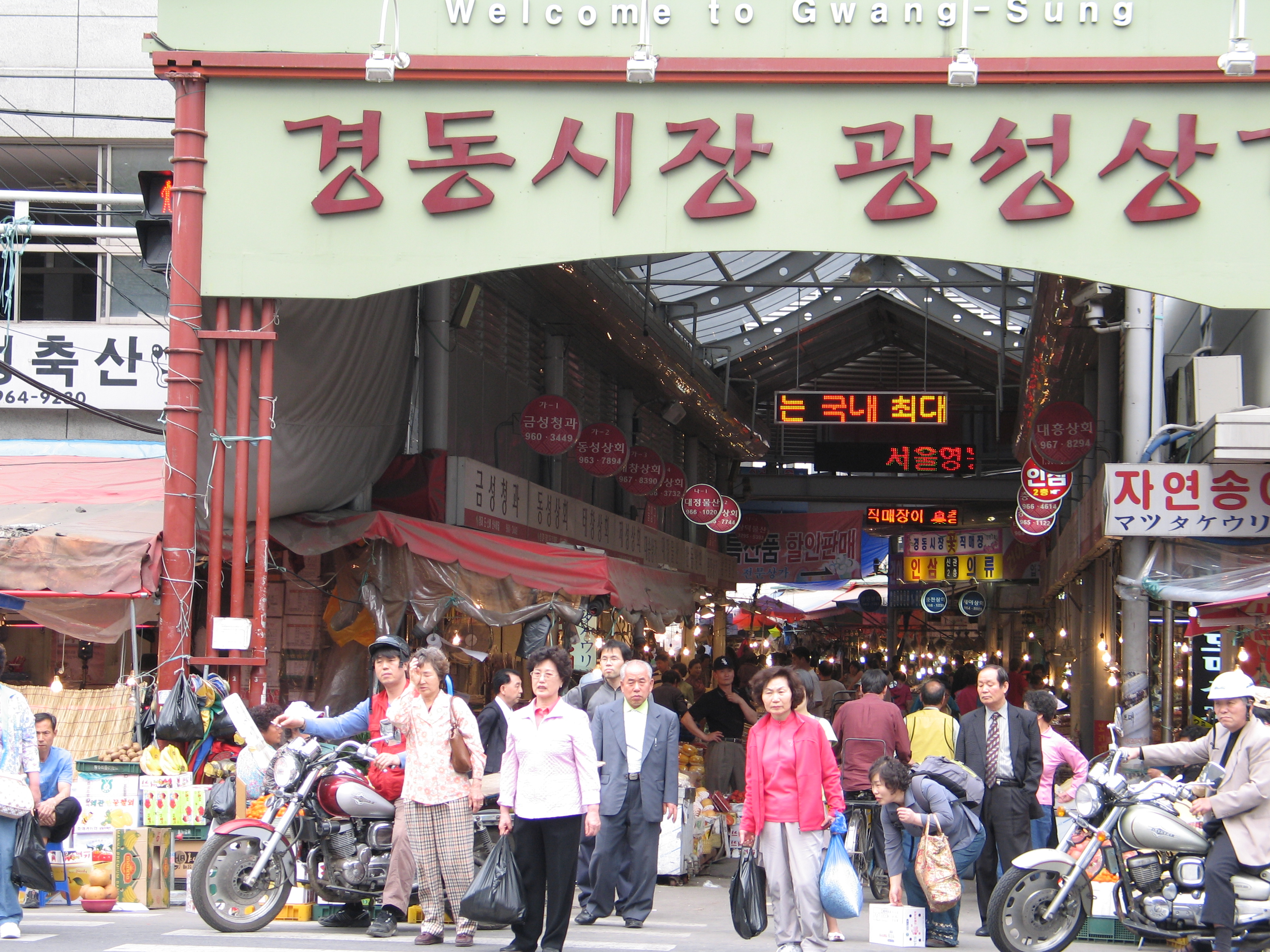

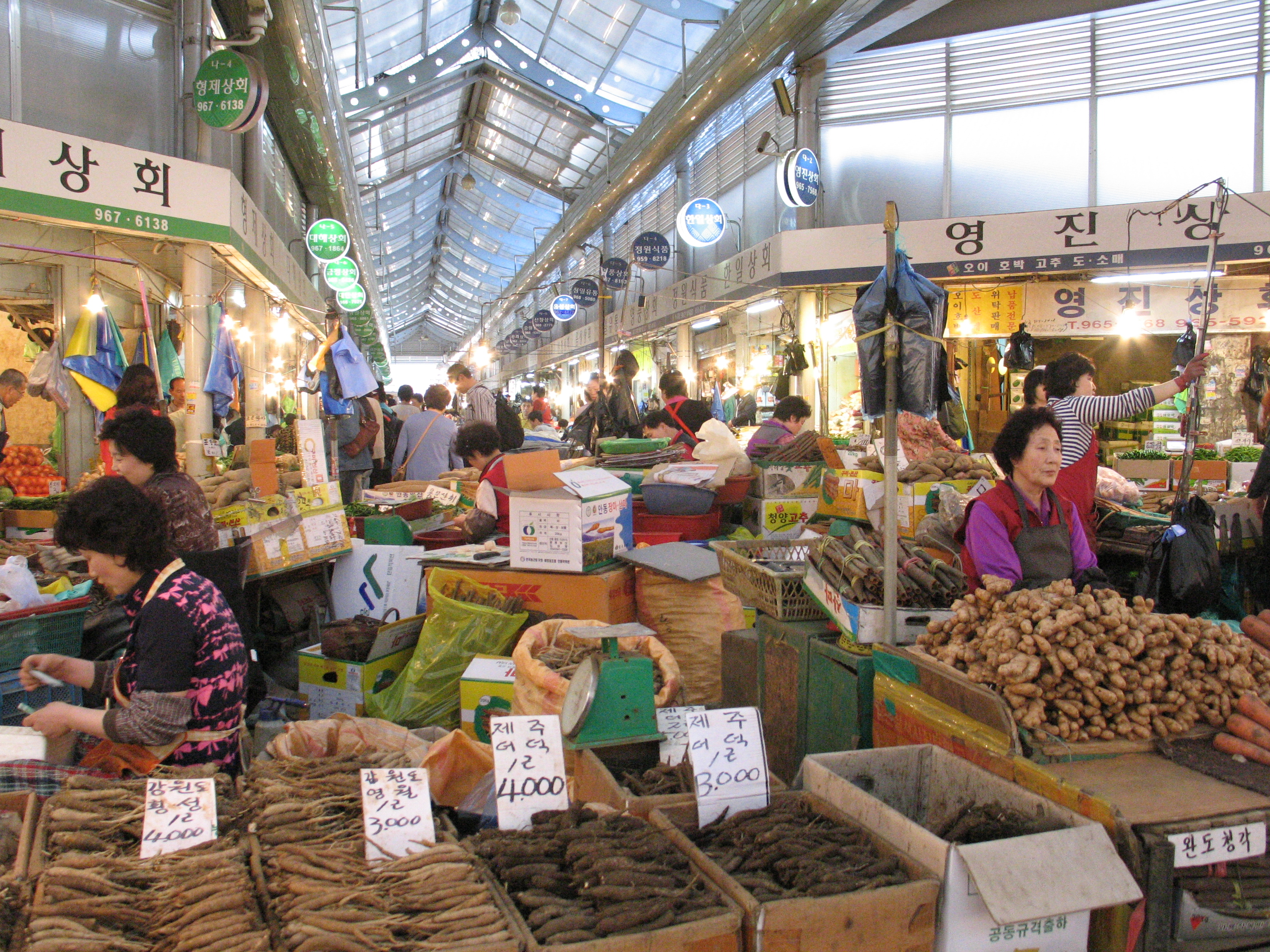

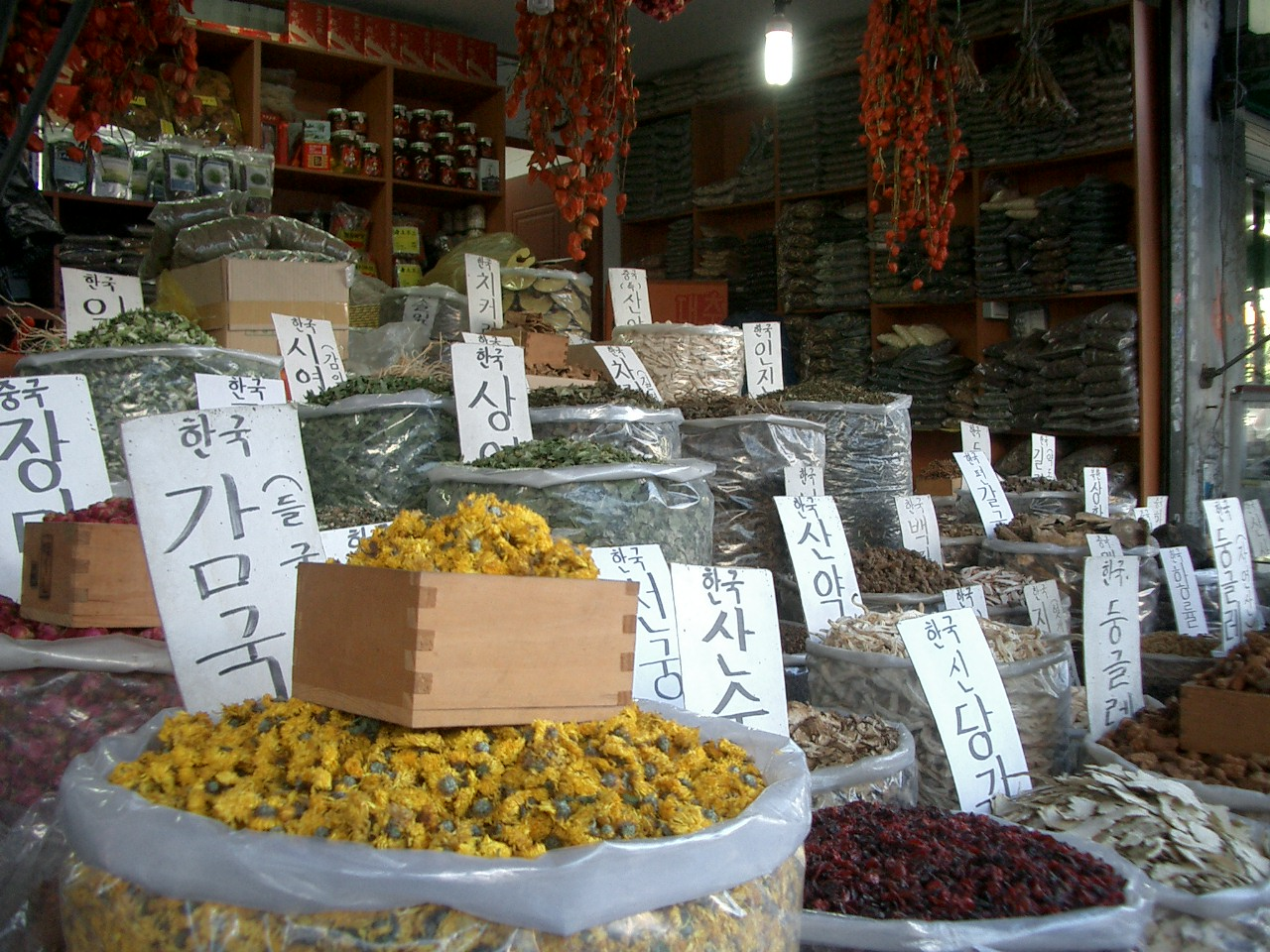

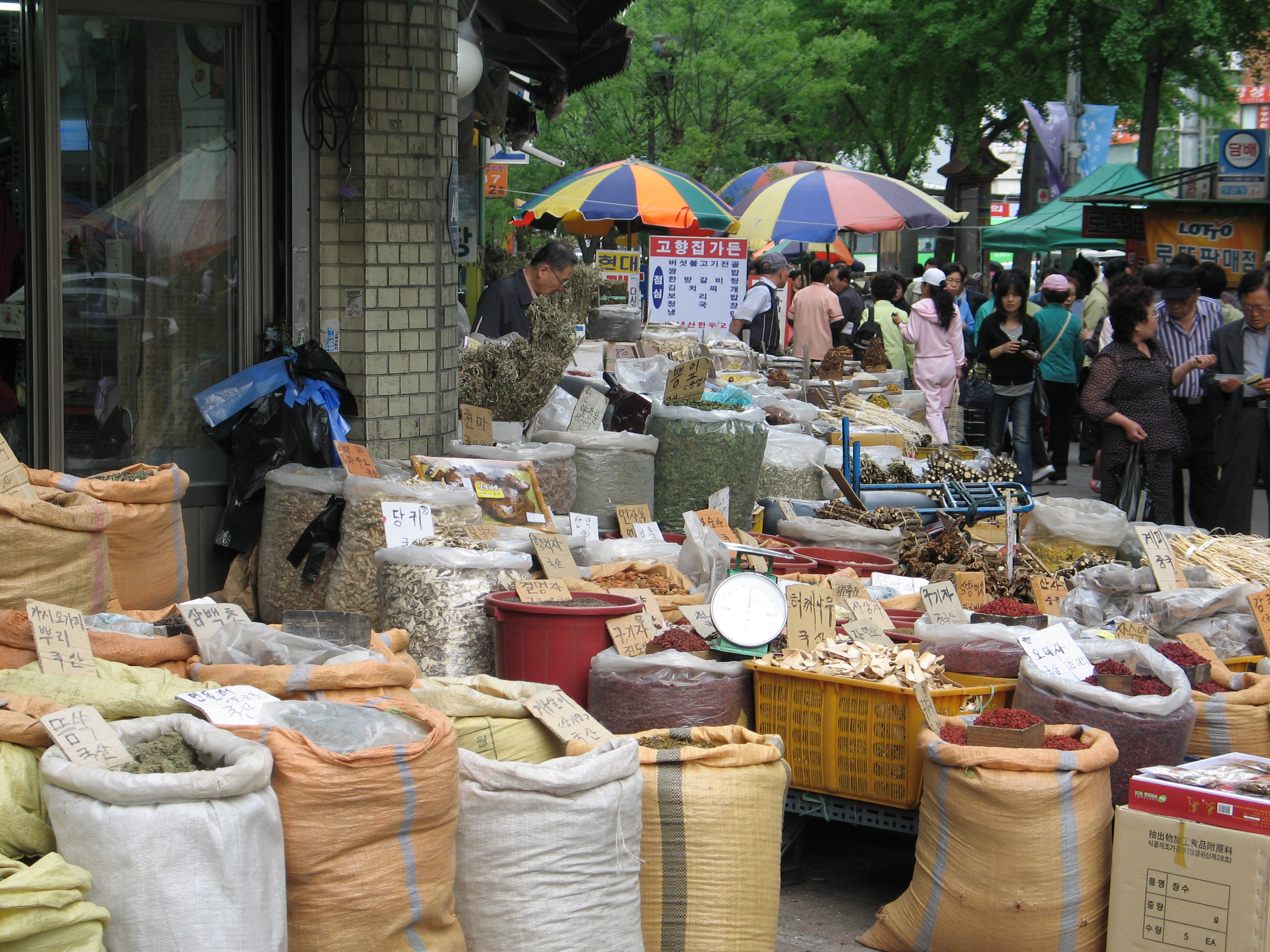

== See also ==
- Shopping in Seoul
- List of markets in South Korea
- List of South Korean tourist attractions
