= Hwigyeong-dong =

- Hoegi Station Pajeon Alley Dongdaemun Hwigyeong 1-dong Community Service Center

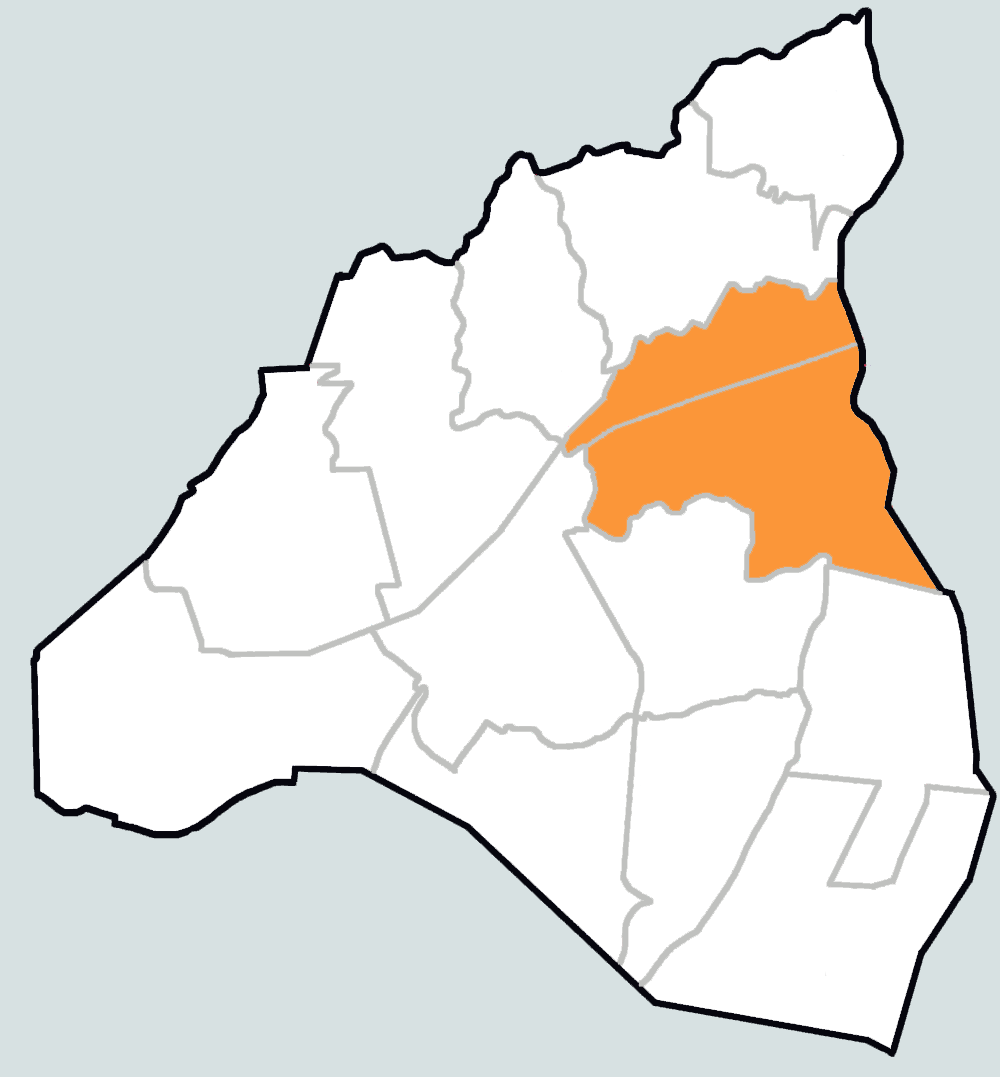
- Hwigyeong-dong in Dongdaemun District
- Country: South Korea

Area
  - Total: 1.67 km^{2} (0.64 sq mi)

Population (2013)
  - Total: 42,299
  - Density: 25,300/km^{2} (65,600/sq mi)

Korean name
- Hangul: 휘경동
- Hanja: 徽慶洞
- RR: Hwigyeong-dong
- MR: Hwigyŏng-dong

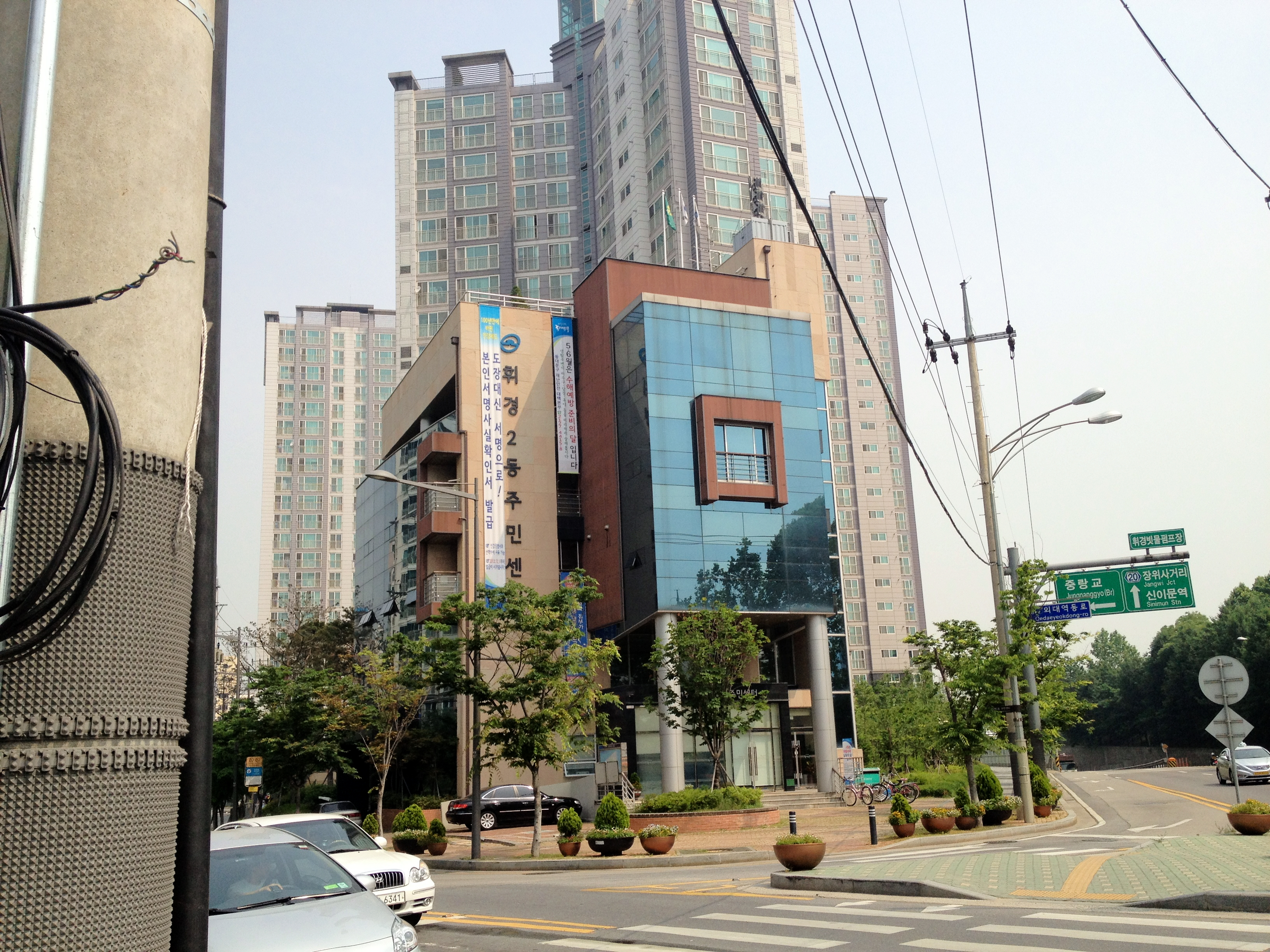
Dongdaemun Hwigyeong 2-dong Community Service Center

Hwigyeong-dong (Korean: 휘경동) is a neighborhood, dong of Dongdaemun District, Seoul, South Korea.

== Overview ==
The name Hwigyeong-dong (휘경동) originates from Hwigyeongwon (휘경원, 徽慶園), the tomb of Subin Park (수빈 박씨), the biological mother of King Sunjo, dating to the late Joseon Dynasty. Subin Park was the third daughter of Park Jun-won, who held the position of Pandonnyeongbusa.

In the 11th year of King Jeongjo's reign, she placed second in the royal concubine selection held to secure an heir to the throne, and was chosen as a third-rank concubine with the title Myeongwon. Her palace designation was Gasungung. In June of the 14th year of Jeongjo’s reign, she gave birth to the wonja (royal heir, later King Sunjo) at Jipokheon Hall in Changdeokgung Palace, an event that greatly pleased the royal court.

In the 24th year of Jeongjo's reign, the wonja was formally invested as Crown Prince. In June of the same year, King Jeongjo passed away, and Sunjo ascended the throne at the age of only eleven. As a result, Queen Dowager Jeongsun governed as regent (suryeom cheongjeong), although the influence of Sunjo's biological mother, Subin Park, was also substantial.

Subin Park died in 1822, the 22nd year of Sunjo's reign. King Sunjo selected a burial site at the foot of Mount Baebongsan in Yangju County, in what is now Hwigyeong-dong (lots 7–8), and conducted the funeral on February 27, 1823 (the 23rd year of Sunjo's reign), naming the tomb Hwigyeong (徽慶).

Afterward, King Sunjo frequently visited Hwigyeongwon with the Crown Prince. Consequently, the surrounding area—previously a quiet village—became widely known and was commonly referred to as Hwigyeongwon or Hwigyeong-ri. The place name evolved over time: it was initially called Hwigyeongwon, later Hwigyeong-ri, and eventually Hwigyeong-dong.

During the Joseon period, the area was known as Hwigyeong-ri in Nam-myeon of Yangju County (a region entirely different from present-day Nam-myeon of Yangju). It was later renamed Hwigyeong-ri of Goyangju-myeon, and adjacent areas such as Jeonnong-ri and parts of Cheongnyangni were also included. During the Gabo Reforms of 1894, it was designated as Hwigyeongwon, an outer district located beyond the East and West Inchang-dong gates.

On April 1, 1936, following the expansion of Gyeongseong, the area was transferred from Gyeonggi Province to Gyeongseong and renamed Hwigyeong-jeong. On June 10, 1943, with the implementation of the district system, it became part of Dongdaemun-gu. After Korea’s liberation, Japanese-style neighborhood names were replaced with traditional Korean ones, and Hwigyeongwon was officially changed to its current name, Hwigyeong-dong.

On July 1, 1980, due to population growth, part of Myeonmok-dong was incorporated into the area, and Hwigyeong 2-dong was established as a separate administrative district.

== See also ==
- Administrative divisions of South Korea
