= Jangan-dong =

Neighborhood of Seoul, South Korea

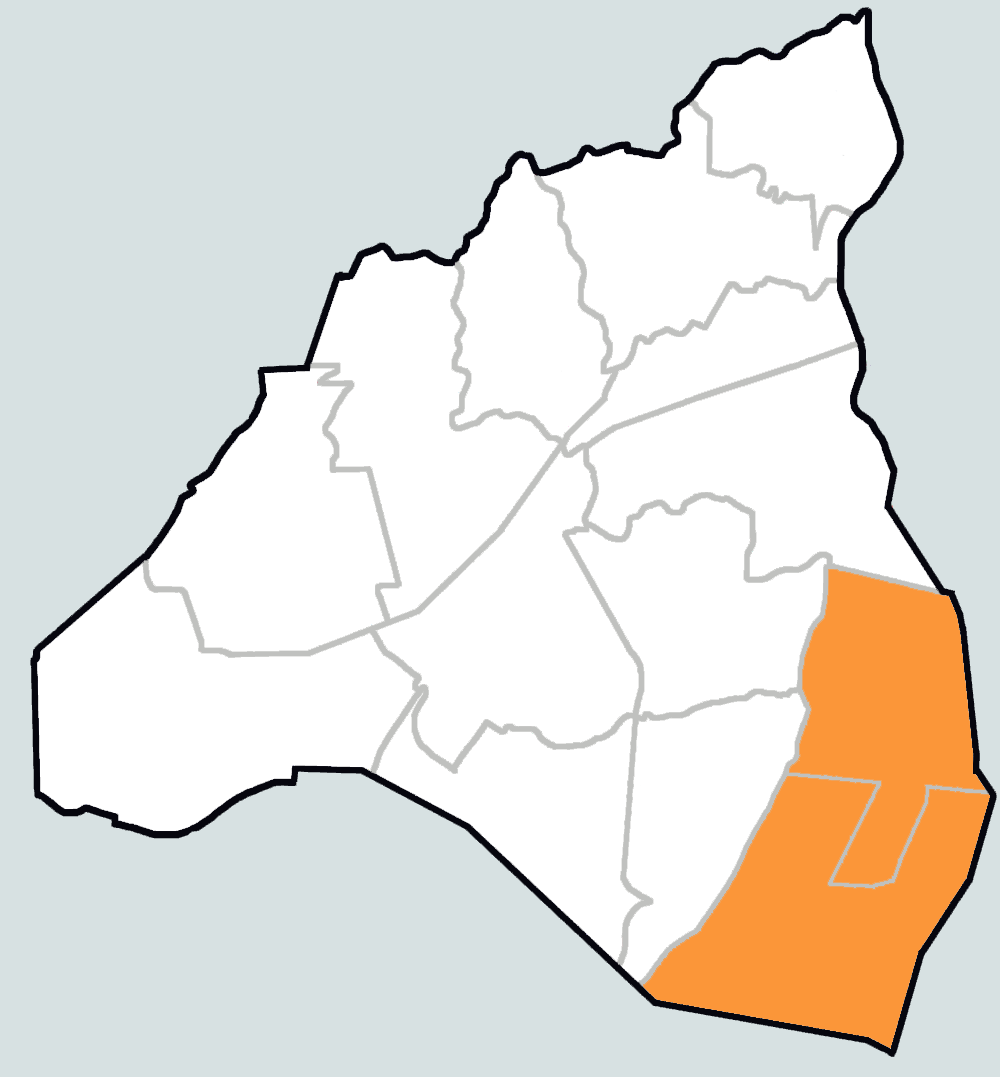
- Jangan-dong in Dongdaemun District
- Country: South Korea

Area
  - Total: 2.33 km^{2} (0.90 sq mi)

Population (2013)
  - Total: 69,650
  - Density: 29,900/km^{2} (77,400/sq mi)

Korean name
- Hangul: 장안동
- Hanja: 長安洞
- RR: Jangan-dong
- MR: Changan-dong

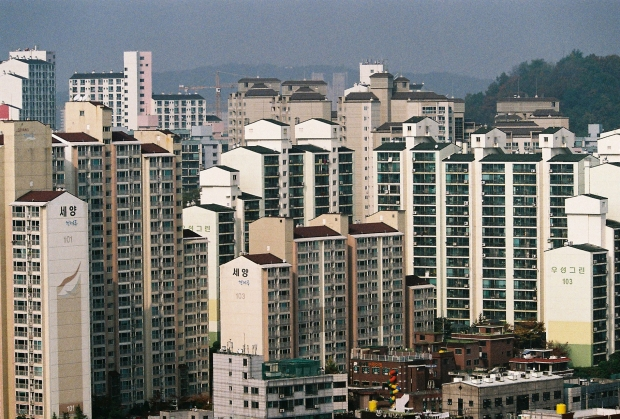
High rise apartments in Jangan-dong

Jangan-dong (Korean: 장안동) is a dong (neighborhood) of Dongdaemun District, Seoul, South Korea.

Jangan-dong is a neighborhood in Dongdaemun District, Seoul, South Korea. The area contains residential and commercial developments, including several apartment complexes. Its commercial areas include bars, motels, nightclubs, and restaurants. Jangan-dong is served by public transportation and is connected to other parts of Seoul, including Dongdaemun and Gangnam.

There are countless restaurants in the Jangan-dong area. Most restaurants serve traditional Korean food, but there are also many international food restaurants including Vietnamese, Chinese, and Japanese. American food chains are also in the neighborhood. Jangan-dong has over twenty modern coffee shops, with more opening their doors daily. As for shopping, the Bauhaus department store sells a variety of goods from Top 10, ABC Mart and Nike. The mall also include a large food court, Lotte grocery store, and a movie theatre. There are also several English Academies, including Dongdaemun Poly School.

Near Jangang-dong subway station on the purple line #5, several used automotive and repair shops can be found. Near some of the southernmost subway exits, men stand in the street and shout in attempts to woo customers into their auto shop. Northeast of the subway and one street behind are several low-priced shops doing auto repair on air conditioners, fixing damaged bumpers, selling new wheels and rims, etc.

== Notable people ==
- Jeong Jinsol (known as JinSoul), singer-songwriter, member of girl group LOONA

== See also ==
- Administrative divisions of South Korea
