= Cheongnyangni-dong =

Coordinates: 37.586°N 127.047°E

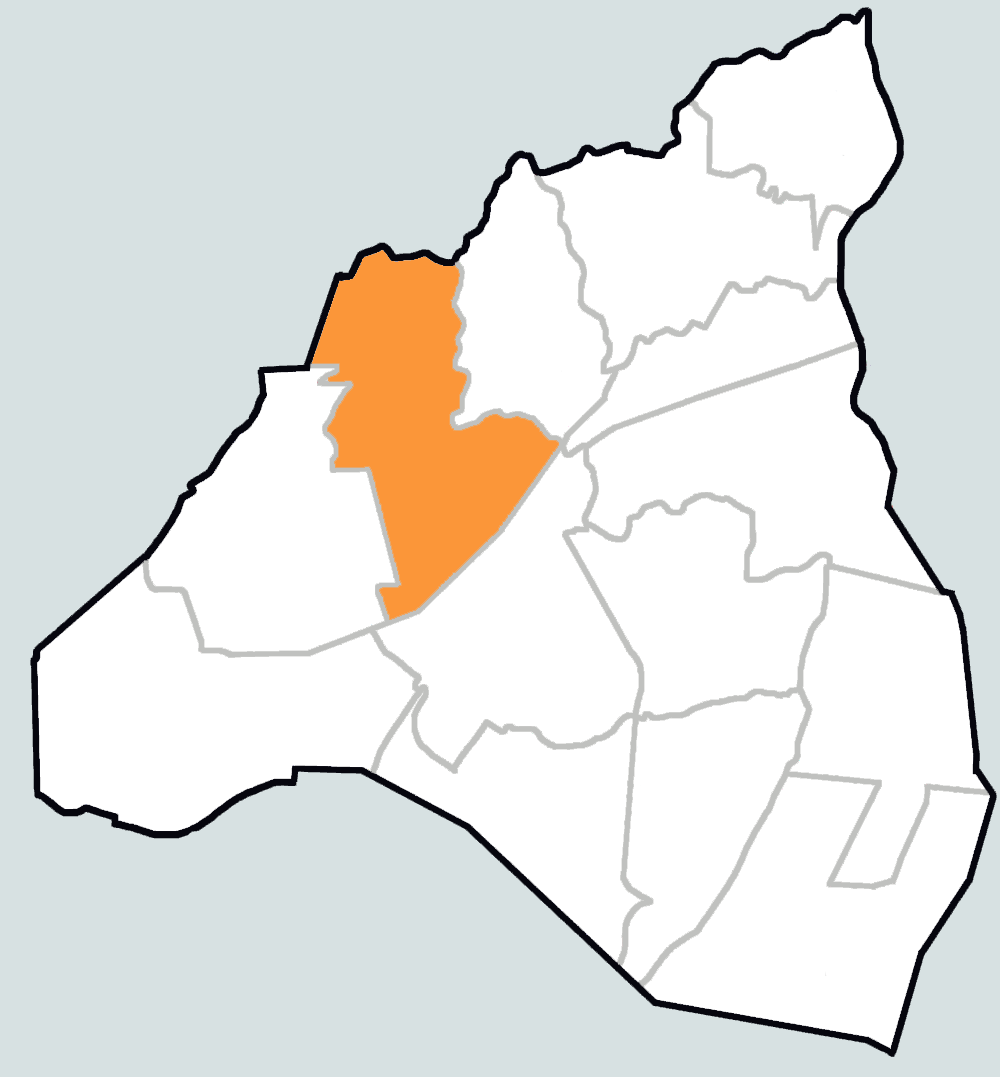
- Cheongnyangni-dong in Dongdaemun District
- Country: South Korea

Area
  - Total: 1.16 km^{2} (0.45 sq mi)

Population (2013)
  - Total: 24,137
  - Density: 20,800/km^{2} (53,900/sq mi)

Korean name
- Hangul: 청량리동
- Hanja: 淸凉里洞
- RR: Cheongnyangni-dong
- MR: Ch'ŏngnyangni-dong

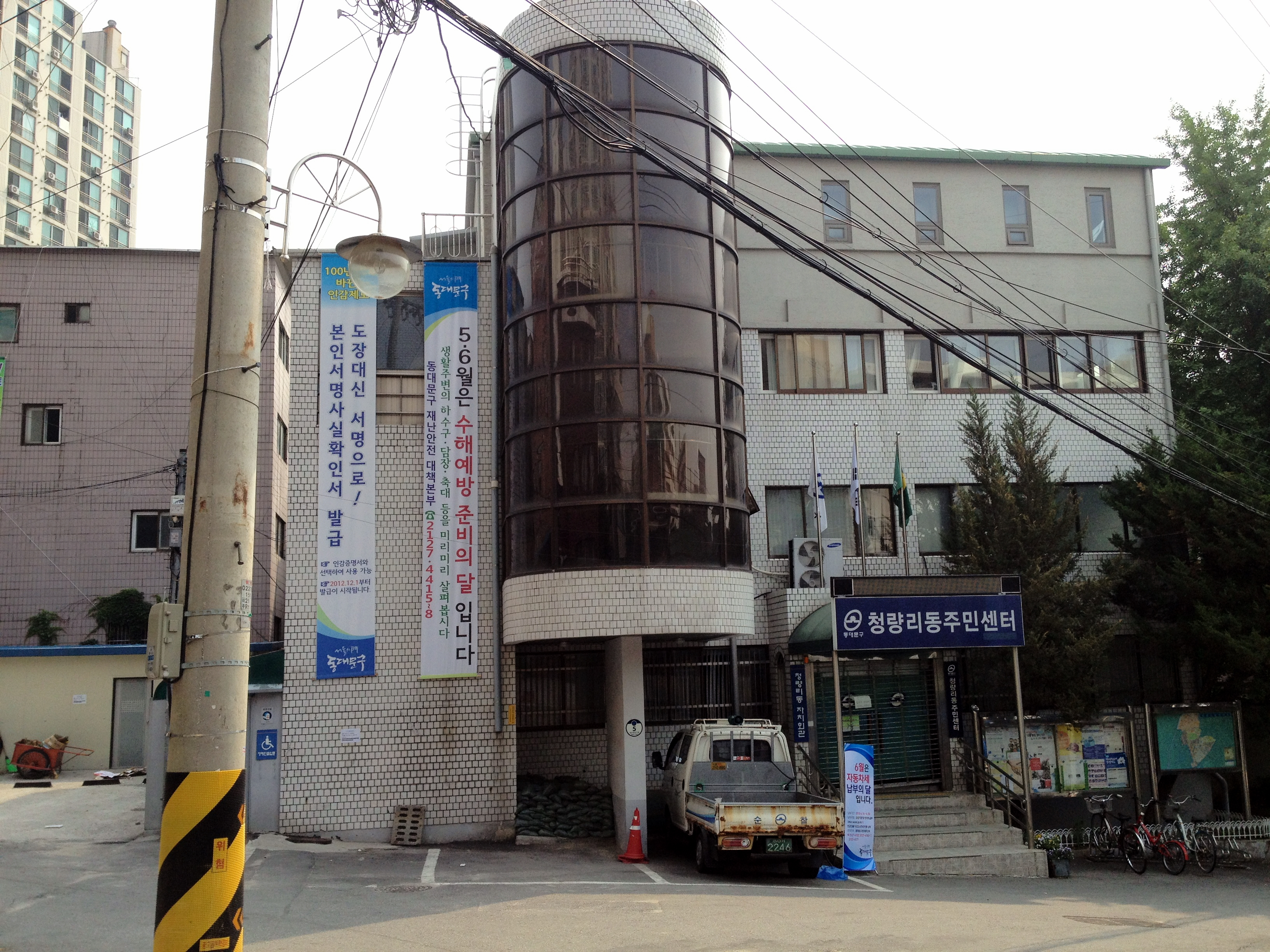
Dongdaemun Cheongnyangni-dong Community Service Center

Cheongnyangni-dong (Korean: 청량리동) is a dong (neighborhood) of Dongdaemun District, Seoul, South Korea.

At this dong, there are many convenient buildings like many kinds of financial companies and banks, a branch of Lotte Department Store, and Cheongnyangni Station. From Cheongnyangni Station, Mugunghwa-ho trains depart for Chuncheon from 06:15 to 22:20 and for Wonju, Jecheon, Taebaek, Gangneung, Yeongju, and Andong from 7:00 to 22:40 every hour except 22:00.

There are many kinds of medical hospitals and clinics. Especially, Saint Paul's Hospital of Catholic University of Korea is the largest hospital in Cheongnyangni-dong. In this hospital, there are many treatment rooms in which treats many kinds of diseases, operating theatres and wards.

== See also ==
- Cheongnyangni Station
- Cheongnyangni 588
- Administrative divisions of South Korea
