= University of Seoul =

Public university in South Korea

Coordinates: 37.583324°N 127.058387°E

- 서울시립대학교
- Motto: 진리·창조·봉사 (眞理·創造·奉仕)
- Motto in English: Truth, Creation, Public Service
- Type: Public
- Established: May 1, 1918; 108 years ago
- President: Won Yongkul (원용걸)
- Faculty: 458 (2025 Higher Education Information Disclosure)
- Administrative staff: 698 (2025 Higher Education Information Disclosure)
- Students: 12,008 (2025 Higher Education Information Disclosure)
- Undergraduates: 8,949 (2025 Higher Education Information Disclosure)
- Postgraduates: 3,059 (2025 Higher Education Information Disclosure)
- Location: Seoul, South Korea
- Campus: 66.87 acres (27.06 ha); Urban
- Colors: Blue
- Nickname: Siripdae (시립대·市立大)
- Mascot: Hawk
- Website: www.uos.ac.kr/en/ (in English) www.uos.ac.kr (in Korean)

Korean name
- Hangul: 서울시립대학교
- Hanja: 서울市立大學校
- RR: Seoul sirip daehakgyo
- MR: Sŏul sirip taehakkyo

The University of Seoul is a four-year public comprehensive university in Dongdaemun-gu.

It has its origins as Gyeongseong Public Agricultural School, which opened on May 1, 1918, and is currently the only four-year comprehensive university among public universities in Korea.[3] It is operated by the Seoul Metropolitan Government, and the mayor of Seoul is responsible for its operation as the chairman of the Seoul University Steering Committee. The University of Seoul comprises 9 colleges, 39 departments, 10 graduate schools, 2 affiliated institutions, and 14 research institutes.

== History ==
1918 - May 1 Opening of Gyeongseong Public Agricultural School

1950 - Approved for establishment of Seoul Agricultural Elementary School

1956 - School name changed to Seoul Agricultural College (4-year regular general university)

1973 - Veterinary Medicine and Pulmonology

1974 - Seoul National University of Technology[5] School name changed to (General University)

1975 - Management transferred from the Seoul Metropolitan Office of Education to the Seoul Metropolitan Government

1981 - Name changed to Seoul City University Opened the Graduate School of Urban Administration in 1982 (currently Graduate School of Urban Science, 1999)

1987 - Promoted to comprehensive university, name changed to Seoul National University

1990 - Opening of the Graduate School of Business

1991 - Opening of the Graduate School of Industry (currently Graduate School of Science and Technology, 2012)

1996 - New Urban Science College established

1997 - Establishment of Seoul Citizens’ University (currently Lifelong Education Center, 2016), selected as “1997 Excellent Education Reform Promotion University” by the Ministry of Education

1998 - Establishment of the Urban Science Research Institute

1999 - Establishment of the College of Arts (current College of Arts and Physical Education, 2001)

2000 - Graduate School of Taxation and Graduate School of Education opened

2003 - Opening of the Graduate School of Design

2004 - Establishment of Industry-Academic Cooperation Foundation

2005 - Opening of the International Education Center

2009 - Opening of Law School (Law School)

2010 - Gangchon Training Center opened 2013 - Opening of the International Graduate School of Urban Sciences (currently the International Graduate School of Urban Sciences, 2025)

2016 - Newly established Free Convergence University

2018 - 100th anniversary of the school’s opening, opening of the 100th anniversary memorial hall, and opening of the Graduate School of Urban Health (Korea’s first public medical health graduate school)

2019 - Opening of the Student Future Support Center (current Human Resources Development Office, 2024)

2020 - New cutting-edge departments (Artificial Intelligence Department, Department of Convergence and Applied Chemistry) established, Urban Science Big Data and AI Research Institute launched (currently Urban Science Big Data and AI Research Institute, 2022), and IR Center established.

2023 - Completion of Era Convergence Hall

2025 - Opening of Seoul Design Research Institute

2026 - Newly established Artificial Intelligence Convergence University, selected as an 'excellent certified university' for educational internationalization capacity by the Ministry of Education for 14 consecutive years

== Faculty and students ==
Because the Seoul Metropolitan Government supported 70% of the annual budget, UOS is one of the best value public universities. UOS has the lowest student-faculty ratio, the highest financial investment per student, and the highest rate of scholarship recipients in South Korea. In addition, most administrative staff in UOS are affiliated with the Seoul Metropolitan Government.

Many UOS students think that they take a lot of financial and educational benefits from the Seoul government, so they feel obligated to participate in social work. Number of social work volunteers in 2012 was 3,105 and is expected to increase.

Student satisfaction is relatively very high. In 2012, the registration rate of new students was very high (96%) and the withdrawal rate of students was extremely low (0.97%), compared with other universities in Seoul.

== Community outreach ==
UOS has long been providing services for Seoul and the citizens of Seoul. In particular, UOS provides a diverse range of training programs for municipal officials, national government officials, and experts in the public sector. Since 1997, UOS has provided Seoul citizens with lifelong education at UOS Open University located near the Gwanghwa Gate in central Seoul. UOS Open University provides a broad range of education programs including languages, technologies, Seoul Study, and various cultural activities. UOS has vocational and educational programs for more than 5,000 Seoulites annually in the Continuing Education Center. The Social Welfare Center located on the main campus provides a wide range of social services for more than 100,000 senior citizens and disabled citizens a year.

== Academics ==
=== Colleges ===
==== College of Public affairs and Economics ====
- Department of Public Administration
- Department of International Relations
- School of Economics
- Department of Social Welfare
- Department of Science in Taxation

==== College of Business Administration ====
- School of Business Administration

==== College of Engineering ====
- School of Electrical and Computer Engineering
- Department of Chemical Engineering
- Department of Mechanical and Information Engineering
- Department of Materials Science and Engineering
- Department of Civil Engineering
- Department of Computer Science and Engineering
- Department of Artificial Intelligence

==== College of Humanities ====
- Department of English Language and Literature
- Department of Korea Language and Literature
- Department of Korean History
- Department of Philosophy
- Department of Chinese Language and Culture

==== College of Natural Science ====
- Department of Environmental Horticulture
- Department of Statistics
- Department of Mathematics
- Department of Physics
- Department of Life Science
- Department of Convergence and Applied Chemistry

==== College of Urban Science ====
- Department of Urban Administration
- Department of Urban Sociology
- Department of Architectural Engineering
- Department of Architecture
- Department of Urban Planning and Design
- Department of Transportation Engineering
- Department of Landscape Architecture
- School of Environmental Engineering
- Department of Geoinformatics

==== College of Arts and Physical Education ====
- Department of Design
- Department of Environmental Sculpture
- Department of Music
- Department of Sports Sciences

==== College of Liberal Arts and Cross-Disciplinary Studies ====
- School of Liberal Studies
- School of Cross-disciplinary Studies
- School of Liberal Arts Education

=== Graduate school ===
The Graduate School has 40 courses for master's degrees and 37 courses for doctoral degrees. In addition, there's specialized graduate schools as follows.

- Graduate School of Science in Taxation
- Graduate School of Design
- University of Seoul Law School
- Graduate School of Urban Sciences
- Graduate School of Business Administration
- Graduate School of Science and Technology
- Graduate School of Education
- International School of Urban Sciences
- Graduate School of Urban Health

=== University of Seoul Law School ===
University of Seoul Law School is one of the professional graduate schools of University of Seoul. Founded in 2009, it is one of the founding law schools in South Korea and is one of the smaller schools with each class in the three-year J.D. program having approximately 50 students.

== Rankings and reputation ==
University rankings
| JoongAng National | Domestic | =14 |
| QS National | General | 30–31 |
| THE National | General | 22–27 |
| QS Asia (Asia version) | General | 166 |
| THE Asia (Asia version) | General | 251–300 |
| USNWR Asia | General | =283 |
| QS World | General | 851-900 |
| THE World | General | 801–1000 |
| USNWR World | General | =913 |

In 2012, UOS was ranked as one of the top three among universities that do not have a medical school. According to 2015 report from The Times Higher Education, UOS ranked 7th among all the Korean universities and 49th among all the Asian universities. In another survey, UOS ranked 14th in the Asian midsize universities. UOS was reported the best value public university in Korea, with high financial investment and scholarship amount per student. Students' affinity to the school was ranked in the first place and students' satisfaction is in the second place according to a 2010 survey.

== See also ==
- List of national universities in South Korea
- List of universities and colleges in South Korea
- Education in Korea
