= Yongdu-dong =

- Neighbourhood
- Yongdu-dong Jukkumi Alley
- Interactive map of Yongdu-dong
- Country: South Korea

Area
  - Total: 1.09 km^{2} (0.42 sq mi)

Population (2001)
  - Total: 25,281
  - Density: 23,200/km^{2} (60,100/sq mi)

Korean name
- Hangul: 용두동
- Hanja: 龍頭洞
- RR: Yongdu-dong
- MR: Yongdu-dong

Yongdu-dong (Korean: 용두동) is a dong, legal neighbourhood, of Dongdaemun District, Seoul, South Korea.

== Overview ==
The name of the area originates from the shape of the hill behind the village, which was said to resemble a "dragon's head," and it was therefore called Yongmeori or Yongduri (龍頭里, "Dragon Head Village"). In 1894, during the Gabo Reform, Yongduri was established as part of Inchangbang (outside the city) in Hanseongbu.

In 1911, it became Yongdu-ri of Inchang-myeon, Hanseongbu. In 1914, it became Yongdu-ri of Sungin-myeon, Goyang County, and in 1936, it was reincorporated into Gyeongseong-bu.

On June 11, 1943, with the implementation of the district system, it was incorporated into Dongdaemun District.

In 2009, Yongdu-dong was merged with Sinseol-dong to form the integrated administrative dong of Yongshin-dong. Later, on July 1, 2025, it was separated again, reestablishing Sinseol-dong and Yongdu-dong as independent administrative dongs.

== See also ==
- Administrative divisions of South Korea
