= Administrative divisions of Dobong District =

There are 4 dong (neighborhoods) in Dobong District.

- Banghak-dong (방학동 放鶴洞) 1, 2, 3
- Chang-dong (창동 倉洞) 1, 2, 3, 4, 5
- Dobong-dong (도봉동 道峰洞) 1, 2
- Ssangmun-dong (쌍문동 雙門洞) 1, 2, 3, 4

== List by population and area ==
Name	Population	Area	Population Density
Banghak-dong	89,855	4.07 km² (1.57 sq mi)	22,077 /km² (57,180 /sq mi)
Dobong-dong	56,990	9.55 km² (3.7 sq mi)	5,697 /km² (15,402 /sq mi)
Chang-dong	136,898	4.35 km² (1.68 sq mi)	31,471 /km² (81,509 /sq mi)
Ssangmun-dong	84,893	2.81 km² (1.08 sq mi)	30,211 /km² (78,246 /sq mi)

== General information ==
Name	Sub-divisions	Points of interest	Image	Location	Description
Banghak-dong	Banghak 1-dong; Banghak 2-dong; Banghak 3-dong				
Chang-dong	Chang 1-dong; Chang 2-dong; Chang 3-dong; Chang 4-dong; Chang 5-dong				
Dobong-dong	Dobong 1-dong; Dobong 2-dong				
Ssangmun-dong	Ssangmun 1-dong; Ssangmun 2-dong; Ssangmun 3-dong; Ssangmun 4-dong				
