= Biwon Tteokjip =

Rice cake store in Seoul, South Korea

- Native name: 비원떡집
- Industry: Food
- Founded: 1949; 77 years ago
- Founder: Hong Gan-nan
- Headquarters: 33-1 Bukchon-ro, Jongno District, Seoul, South Korea

Seoul Future Heritage
- Designated: 2020-006
- Website: biwon.net (in Korean)

Biwon Tteokjip (Korean: 비원떡집) is a historic tteok (Korean rice cake) store in Seoul, South Korea. It was established in 1949, and has remained a family business since then. It was run by the third generation of the family by the 2010s. In 2017, it was designated an Oraegage, a store of historic value, by the Seoul Metropolitan Government. It is also a Seoul Future Heritage. It is listed on the Blue Ribbon Survey, a South Korean restaurant guide.

The store's recipes descend from those of Han Hui-sun (한희순; 1889–1972), whom was reportedly one of the last royal court ladies of Joseon. She supervised the palace kitchens during the reigns of the final Korean monarchs Gojong and Sunjong. She handed her recipes down to Hong Gan-nan (홍간난; 1925–1999). Hong opened Biwon Tteokjip in 1949. The store was initially located near the former palace Changdeokgung. The store is possibly named for the Changdeokgung Secret Garden (called a biwon). The store was reportedly frequented by South Korean leader Park Chung Hee. In 1984, she handed the store off to her nephew, Ahn In-cheol (안인철), whom had worked there since the 1970s. Hong continued to work at the store until her death. Ahn moved the store to Susong-dong in Jongno District. Ahn handed the store off to his son, Ahn Sang-min (안상민) in the early 2010s.

Ahn reportedly overhauled the store's packaging, design, and recipes after he took over, which led to an increase in sales. The tteok is reportedly all still made by hand. Ahn also had the store placed on travel guides for Japanese and Chinese customers, which also increased sales. The store reportedly prepares inventory on the day of, and closes early if it runs out of stock.

== See also ==
- Oraegage#List of Oraegage
