= Kum Bak Yeon =

Gold workshop in Seoul, South Korea

- Native name: 금박연
- Romanized name: Geumbakyeon
- Industry: Gold leaf setting
- Founded: 1856
- Founder: Kim Wan-hyeong
- Headquarters: 24-12 Bukchon-ro 12-gil, Jongno District, Seoul, South Korea

Seoul Future Heritage
- Reference no.: 2020-002
- Website: kumbakyeon.modoo.at

Kum Bak Yeon (Korean: 금박연; Hanja: 金箔宴), also romanized Geumbakyeon, is a historic artisan workshop in Bukchon Hanok Village, Seoul, South Korea. It is named for and specializes in geumbak, traditional Korean gold leaf imprinting. The workshop has operated since 1856, when they produced art for the kings and royal family of Joseon. It has remained a family business; by 2023 the workshop was on its fifth generation of owners. The business is one of the oldest in Seoul, and is a designated Oraegage (store of historic value) and Seoul Future Heritage.

== Description ==
The workshop's founder was Kim Wan-hyeong (김완형), who worked for Cheoljong of Joseon. His successor, Kim Won-sun (김원순), served as a craftsman for Empress Myeongseong. The third generation, Kim Gyeong-yong (김경용), worked for the last Korean monarchs of the Korean Empire. The fourth generation was Kim Deok-hwan. The fifth generation owner is Kim Ki-ho (김기호). Kim did not originally intend to take over the business; he majored in mechanical engineering in college and worked at Samsung Electronics in industrial robot design. After his father, who was the designated holder of the geumbakjang National Intangible Cultural Property of South Korea, fell ill, thirty-year-old Kim decided to learn the trade. After 20 years in the business, he became the 119th holder of the National Intangible Cultural Property. Kim's wife, Park Soo-young (박수영), also learned the trade after marrying into the Kim family. In 2006, they moved the business from Bundang, Seongnam to Jongno District in Seoul. In 2012, they moved again to Bukchon Hanok Village.

Kim once created clothing for the granddaughter of King Gojong, Yi Haegyeong. Even after the Korean royal family lost their influence, the workshop produced gold-decorated hanbok for the first ladies of South Korea, including Yuk Young-soo, Lee Soon-ja, and Lee Hee-ho.

The workshop places gold leaf on a variety of materials, namely clothing. The leaf is attached to the materials using glue made from fish; instead of being applied with a brush, as is done with many other cultures, the gold is stamped on. The workshop offers tours and demonstrations of the craft. They have also expanded their product line to appeal to modern applications as well.

== See also ==
- Oraegage#List of Oraegage
