= Bretelli =

Coordinates: 51°15′15.69″N 5°42′25.96″E

- Interactive map of Bretelli

Restaurant information
- Established: 1999
- Closed: 2018
- Head chef: Jan Marrees
- Food type: French, Regional, Biologic
- Rating: Michelin Guide
- Location: Hoogstraat 8, Weert, 6001 EV, Netherlands
- Seating capacity: 45
- Website: Official website

Bretelli was a restaurant in Weert in the Netherlands from 1999 to its closing in 2018. It was a quality restaurant that was awarded one Michelin star in 2007 and retained that rating until present. In the period 2002-2006 the restaurant held a Bib Gourmand.

In 2013, GaultMillau awarded the restaurant 16 out of 20 points.

From the beginning, Jan Marrees has been the head chef of Bretelli. Since 2010, he is also the owner of the restaurant.

Although the name of the restaurant suggest an Italian connection, the restaurant is named after a set of braces or suspenders (bretels in Dutch).

== See also ==
- List of Michelin starred restaurants in the Netherlands
