= Nagwon Rice Cake =

Rice cake store in Seoul, South Korea

- Native name: 낙원떡집
- Romanized name: Nagwon Tteokjip
- Industry: Food (tteok)
- Founded: c. 1912
- Founder: Go Ippeo
- Headquarters: 438 Samil-daero, Jongno District, Seoul, South Korea

Seoul Future Heritage
- Reference no.: 2013-043

Nagwon Rice Cake (Korean: 낙원떡집; RR: Nagwon tteokjip) is a historic tteok (Korean rice cake) store in Seoul, South Korea. The business began in the 1910s, possibly in 1912. They opened a permanent storefront in 1956. The Seoul Metropolitan Government has designated it a Seoul Future Heritage and an Oraegage in recognition of its historic value. It has remained a family business; it was run by the third generation of the family by the 2010s.

== Description ==
The store has its origins in the Korean royal court. By 1910, Korea was annexed by the Empire of Japan. As a result of this, parts of the Korean royal court were made to leave the palace. The store's eventual founder, Go Ippeo (고이뻐), learned to make tteok from former royal court ladies. Go sold tteok around Wonseo-dong and Nagwon-dong. After the conclusion of the 1950–1953 Korean War, in 1956 they opened a permanent storefront in Nagwon Market. Upon Go's death in 1961, Go's daughter Kim In-dong inherited the store. In 1980, Kim emigrated to the United States, and passed the store onto her daughter Lee Gwang-sun (이광순). It reportedly saw a spike in popularity beginning in the 1980s.

== See also ==
- Oraegage#List of Oraegage
