= HY Tailor =

Historic tailor shop in Seoul, South Korea

- Native name: 한영양복점
- Industry: Tailor
- Founded: 1932; 93 years ago
- Headquarters: 2 Toegye-ro 20-gil, Jung District, Seoul, South Korea

Seoul Future Heritage
- Reference no.: 2013-279

HY Tailor or Han Young Tailor (Korean: 한영양복점; RR: Hanyeong yangbokjeom) is a historic tailor shop in Seoul, South Korea. It was established in 1932, and specializes in customized suits. In 2012, it was designated a Seoul Future Heritage. It is also a designated Oraegage, a store of historic value.

The shop has been visited by both major South Korean politicians, including presidents Kim Dae-jung and Moon Jae-in, and by foreign politicians, including Japanese prime minister Tomiichi Murayama.

The store was established by a Park Jeong-jae (박정재). During the 1950–1953 Korean War, the business went on hiatus as Park fled to Busan for safety. Lee Seong-ho (이성호) took over the business in 1964, and moved it to a new location in 1968. In 1995, Lee passed the business onto his son, Lee Han-yeol (이한열). In 2008, the business was jointly acquired by Choi Hong-gap (최홍갑) and Kim Gil-su (김길수). Kim opened another location of the business in 2011, within the Pacific Hotel. Choi's location closed in 2013. In 2017, it was reported that the business was having difficulty obtaining a successor. The store reportedly encountered some difficulty during the COVID-19 pandemic.

== See also ==
- Oraegage#List of Oraegage
