= Songlim Shoes =

Historic shoemaker in Seoul, South Korea

Coordinates: 37.5665°N 126.9898°E

- Native name: 송림수제화
- Romanized name: Songrim Sujehwa
- Industry: Shoemaking
- Founded: 1936; 90 years ago
- Founder: Lee Gyu-seok
- Headquarters: 60-1 Supyo-ro, Jung District, Seoul, South Korea.
- Owner: Im Myeong-hyeong

Seoul Future Heritage
- Reference no.: 2014-030

Songlim Shoes (Korean: 송림수제화; RR: Songrim Sujehwa) is a historic shoemaker business in Seoul, South Korea. It was founded in 1936, and has remained a family business since then. It is operated by the third generation of the family. It is a designated Oraegage and Seoul Future Heritage.

It was founded as Songrim Hwajeom (송림화점; 松林靴店) in 1936, during the Japanese colonial period. It has remained in the same location since its founding. Its founder was Lee Gyu-seok (이규석). Lee learned shoemaking at age 27 at another shoestore (상동양화점), and opened Songlim Shoes after leaving that store. In 1995, Lee handed off the business to his nephew Im Hyo-seong (임효성). Im handed off his business to Im Myeong-hyeong (임명형), who ran the business by 2019. Im had been working at the store since 1988. By the time he served in the military, he was modifying his and his colleague's boots.

Around the 1950–1953 Korean War, the business began specializing in hiking boots. It based its design on British military boots and began selling them to the public. In 1977, mountaineer Go Sang-don wore Songlim boots while climbing Annapurna. In 1995, explorer Heo Yeong-ho wore Songlim boots while traversing the south and north poles. South Korean president Kim Young-sam reportedly was a customer of the store.

== See also ==
- Oraegage#List of Oraegage
