= Jawoon High School =

School in Seoul, South Korea

Coordinates: 37.65926°N 127.05047°E

- School Badge

Information
- School Motto: Kindness· Gratitude· Health
- Location: Dobong District, Seoul, Korea
- Type: Public
- Established: 2004
- Principal: Soon-Ja Song
- Number of Faculty: 85
- Number of Student: 1310

Other
- Website: http://jawoon.hs.kr

Jawoon High School (Korean: 자운고등학교; Hanja: 紫雲高等學校), established in 2004, is a public high school located in Chang 4-Dong, Dobong District, Seoul. Jawoon High School is one of the newest schools with up-to-date facility in Dobong District, and it is well known as a Dobong-Vision School with Sunduck High School.

== Educational objectives ==
- Education Goal

With mutual harmony, we perform our roles to create a happy school community.

- School Motto

Kindness· Gratitude· Health

- School Badge

Circle: completion, harmony
Triangle: summit of Mt. Dobong
Cloud: auspicious advancement
Purple: the highest status

- School Tree & Flower

Zelkova serrata: great figure, majesty
Royal azalea: faith, temperance

== School Introduction ==
=== Brief history ===
- May 27, 2002 Approval of school foundation project(coeducation, 36 classes)
- Mar. 1, 2004 The inauguration of Mr. Hwa-seoung Hwang as the 1st principal
- Mar. 2, 2004 1st entrance ceremony(12 classes, 422 students)
- Mar. 1, 2007 The inauguration of Ms. Soon-ja Song as the 2nd principal
- Mar. 2, 2008 Designated as a school for "school community" programs(for 2 years)
- Nov. 26, 2008 Designated as a school for "Education for International Understanding" programs
- Feb. 3, 2009 3rd graduation ceremony(total graduates: 1,237)
- Mar. 2, 2009 6th entrance ceremony(12 classes, 438 students)

=== Facility ===
Facilities
Facilities		Number	Facilities	Number
Classroom	General	36	Conference room	1
Classroom	Multi-level	3	Counseling room	1
Special room	Computer lab	2	Health care room	1
Special room	English only	1	Library	1
Special room	Music	1	Broadcasting studio	1
Special room	Science	2	Club activity room	4
Special room	Art	1	Pressroom	1
Special room	Home management lab	1	Toilet	30
Special room	Manual training lab	1	Lounge	2
Special room	Study	1	Cafeteria	1
Staff room		12	Night duty room	1
Gym		1	Dressing room	2
Audio-visual room		1	Guard room	1
Shower room		2	Preparatory room	7

=== Faculty ===
Faculty
	Teaching staff					Administrative staff						total
	principal	viceprincipal	appointed teacher	teacher	sub total	chief	vicechief	clerk	technical official	assistant	sub total	total
Number	1	1	11	61	74	1	1	1	3	5	11	85

=== Organization of classes & the number of students ===
Organization of classes & the number of students(2009.4.30 up to now )
	1st grade		2nd grade				3rd grade				total
	classes	student	humanities & social science		math & natural sciences		humanities & social sciences		math & natural sciences		classes	student
	classes	student	classes	student	classes	student	classes	student	classes	student	classes	student
male	6	225	3	124	3	95	3	117	3	108	18	669
female	6	212	4	162	2	55	4	150	2	62	18	641
total	12	437	7	286	5	150	7	267	5	170	36	1310

=== Extracurricular activities ===
- QUASAR (Science Club)
- Sharp (Basketball&Soccer Team)
- J-Sprit (Jawoon Dance People : Dance Group)
- 씨밀레 (Library Club)
- Mamanty (Cartoon Club)
- 밀알 봉사부 (Voluntary Work Group)
- J-Story (Broadcast Group)
- DICE (Band)
- SHUTTER (Photo Club)
- Newsy (Newspaper)
- 가온누리 (Debating Club)
- 천유아 (Drama Club)
- MID (Film Production Club)
- 크리스탈(UCC Production Club)
- JBC (Music Club)

== Special program ==
1. International Understanding Program
  - As society changes to globalized and multi-cultural and emphasize autonomy and responsibility of education in school, School specialized programs for International Understanding Curriculum. It includes integrated operation of subject-centered activities, discretionary activities, and extra-curricular activities. Main goal of this program is training global talent.
  - Subject-centered Activities
    - making lesson plans for International Understanding and teaching them
  - Discretionary activities
    - the subject of English conversation for 1st grade
    - CCAP(Cross-Culture Awareness Programme) classes with foreigners, lectures related with multicultural education and globalization activities
  - Extra-curricular activities
    - 7 clubs related with International Understanding Education
    - overseas volunteer activity: selected among 1st & 2nd graders → to Southeast Asia
    - interchange with foreign school: student exchange between Korea & Japan
  - Support system of International Understanding Education
    - agreement to cooperate with HUFS(Hankuk University of Foreign Studies)
    - support of UNESCO(related with CCAP)
2. Model School for School Community
  - Needing for create an educational environment where the school community participates and play a role as a center of education & culture in the community, School raised the level of education by creating a new school.
  - Creating an educational environment by developing a school community
    - school development committee: with teachers, parents, and local figures
    - building consensus among the members of community: parents' association & workshop
    - healthy school life: parents' organization monitoring of school lunch
  - Educational activities with the members of community
    - reading club, fathers' meeting to discuss what's happening in the school, literature-related trip
    - MBTI(Myers-Briggs Type Indicator) Test with teachers, students, and parents
  - School community activities with local residents
    - to open facilities in school: library and gym
    - parents' voluntary organization(Saffron)

== Reputation ==
- Under great teacher, many graduates of Jawoon High School go to prestigious universities such as KAIST, Seoul National University, Korea University, Yonsei University, and medical schools.

== Direction ==
- Subway : (Line No. 1 & 4) Chang-dong Station Exit 1 ⇨10 minutes on foot
- Bus : (Bus Stop ①, ②) No. 1119(Academy House ↔ Chang-dong Station), 1161(Duksung Women's University ↔ Nowon-gu Office), 08(Musugol ↔ Chang-dong Station), 09(Dobongsan Station ↔ Chang-dong Station)

== Citation ==
1. http://www.siminilbo.co.kr/article.aspx?cat_code=02020000N&article_id=20100104161700139%5B%5D
2. http://jawoon.hs.kr

== See also ==
- http://www.sen.go.kr
- https://web.archive.org/web/20060220190220/http://www.dobong.go.kr/
