= Dongyang Bookstore =

Historic bookstore in Seoul, South Korea

Coordinates: 37.5854°N 127.0005°E

- Native name: 동양서림
- Romanized name: Dongyang Seorim
- Industry: Bookstore
- Founded: 1953; 72 years ago
- Founder: Lee Sun-gyeong
- Headquarters: 271-1 Changgyeonggung-ro, Hyehwa-dong, Jongno District, Seoul, South Korea
- Owner: Choi Su-yeong

Seoul Future Heritage
- Reference no.: 2013-078

Dongyang Bookstore (Korean: 동양서림; RR: Dongyang Seorim) is a historic bookstore in Jongno District, Seoul, South Korea. It is one of the oldest active bookstores in Seoul, having been founded in 1953. It is a designated Seoul Future Heritage.

It was initially located in Hyehwa-dong, before moving to its current location in 1954. Its founder was Lee Sun-gyeong (이순경), the wife of painter Chang Ucchin and daughter of Yi Pyong-do. She reportedly served as the breadwinner between her and her husband, through the business. In 1987, she handed off the business to her long-time employee Choi Ju-bo (최주보). In 2004, Choi handed the business off to her daughter, So-yeong (최소영). By 2019, the younger Choi was still the CEO. After the business was designated a Seoul Future Heritage in the 2010s, the Seoul Metropolitan Government provided funds for its renovation. The store was reportedly previously a cramped one-floor business that was packed with bookshelves. After the renovation, bookshelves were removed to make room for readers, and they began work on creating a cafe space for customers. A second floor was added, with bookshelves of poetry. They kept the original faded facade of the restaurant, in order to show that it was a historic and aged place.

The store has hosted author events with people such as Han Kang and Gu Byeong-mo.

== See also ==
- Tongmungwan – the oldest active bookstore in South Korea
- Itaewon Books – one of the oldest English-language bookstores in Seoul
