= Ssangmun station =

Station of the Seoul Metropolitan Subway

쌍문; Ssangmun
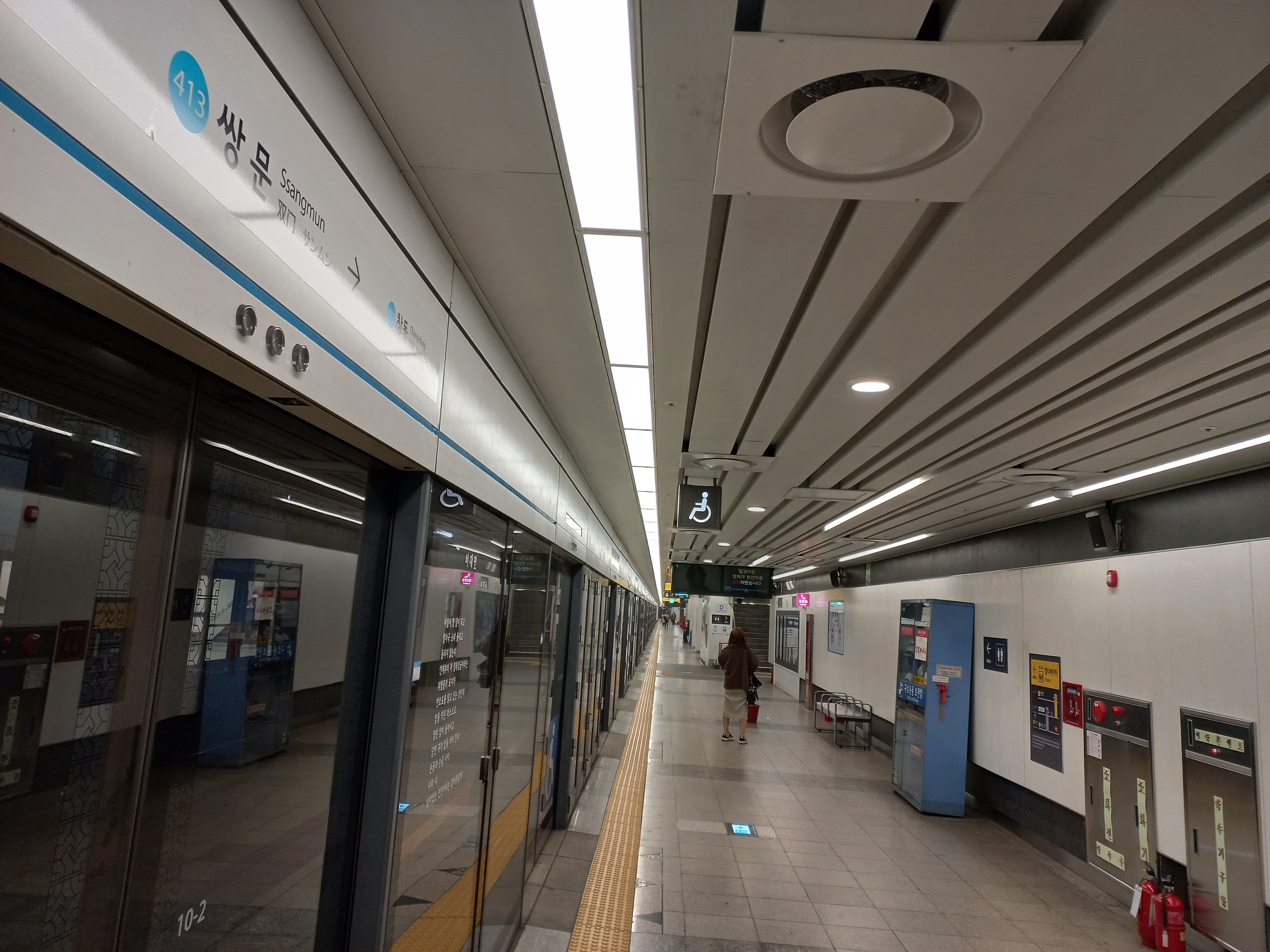

Korean name
- Hangul: 쌍문역
- Hanja: 雙門驛
- Revised Romanization: Ssangmunnyeok
- McCune–Reischauer: Ssangmunnyŏk

General information
- Location: 486-1 Dobong-ro, 703-4 Chang 1-dong, Dobong-gu, Seoul
- Coordinates: 37.64859°N 127.03471°E
- Operated by: Seoul Metro
- Line(s): Line 4
- Platforms: 2
- Tracks: 2

Construction
- Structure type: Underground

History
- Opened: April 20, 1985

Passengers
- (Daily) Based on Jan-Dec of 2012. Line 4: 65,642

Services
Preceding station	Seoul Metropolitan Subway	Following station
Chang-dong towards Jinjeop	Line 4	Suyu towards Oido

Ssangmun Station (Korean: 쌍문역; Hanja: 雙門驛) is an underground station on Seoul Subway Line 4 in Dobong-gu, Seoul, South Korea.

== Station layout ==
G	Street level	Exit

L1; Concourse	Lobby	Customer Service, Shops, Vending machines, ATMs

L2; Platforms	Side platform, doors will open on the right
L2; Platforms	Northbound	← Line 4 toward Jinjeop (Chang-dong)
L2; Platforms	Southbound	Line 4 toward Oido (Suyu) →
L2; Platforms	Side platform, doors will open on the right

== Vicinity ==
- Exit 1: Changbuk Middle School, Changdong High School
- Exit 2: Hanshin Imaejin APT, Taeyeong APT
- Exit 3: Ssangmun Hanyang APT, Hanil Hospital
- Exit 4: Sindobong Middle School

== Gallery ==
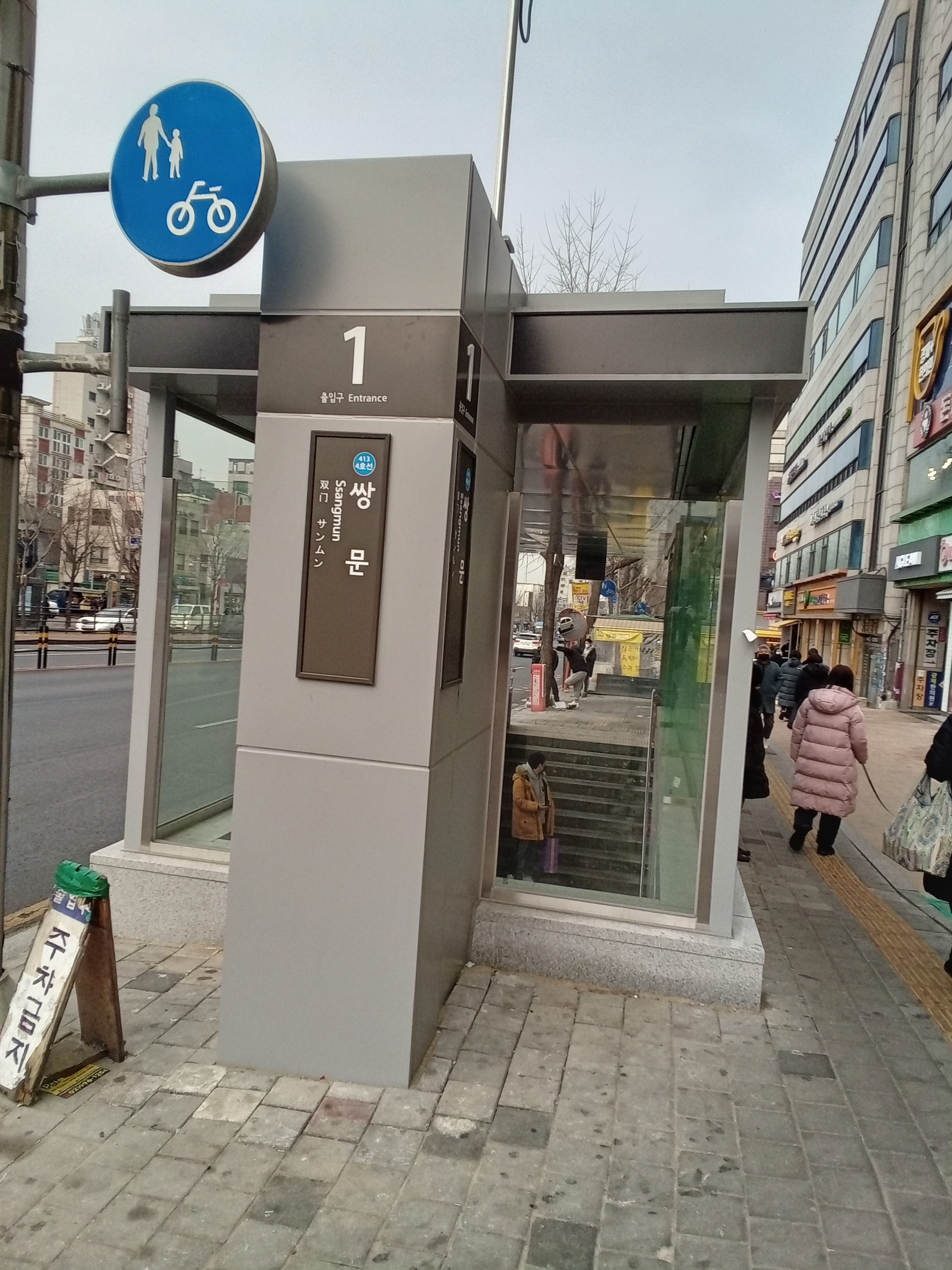
Exit 1

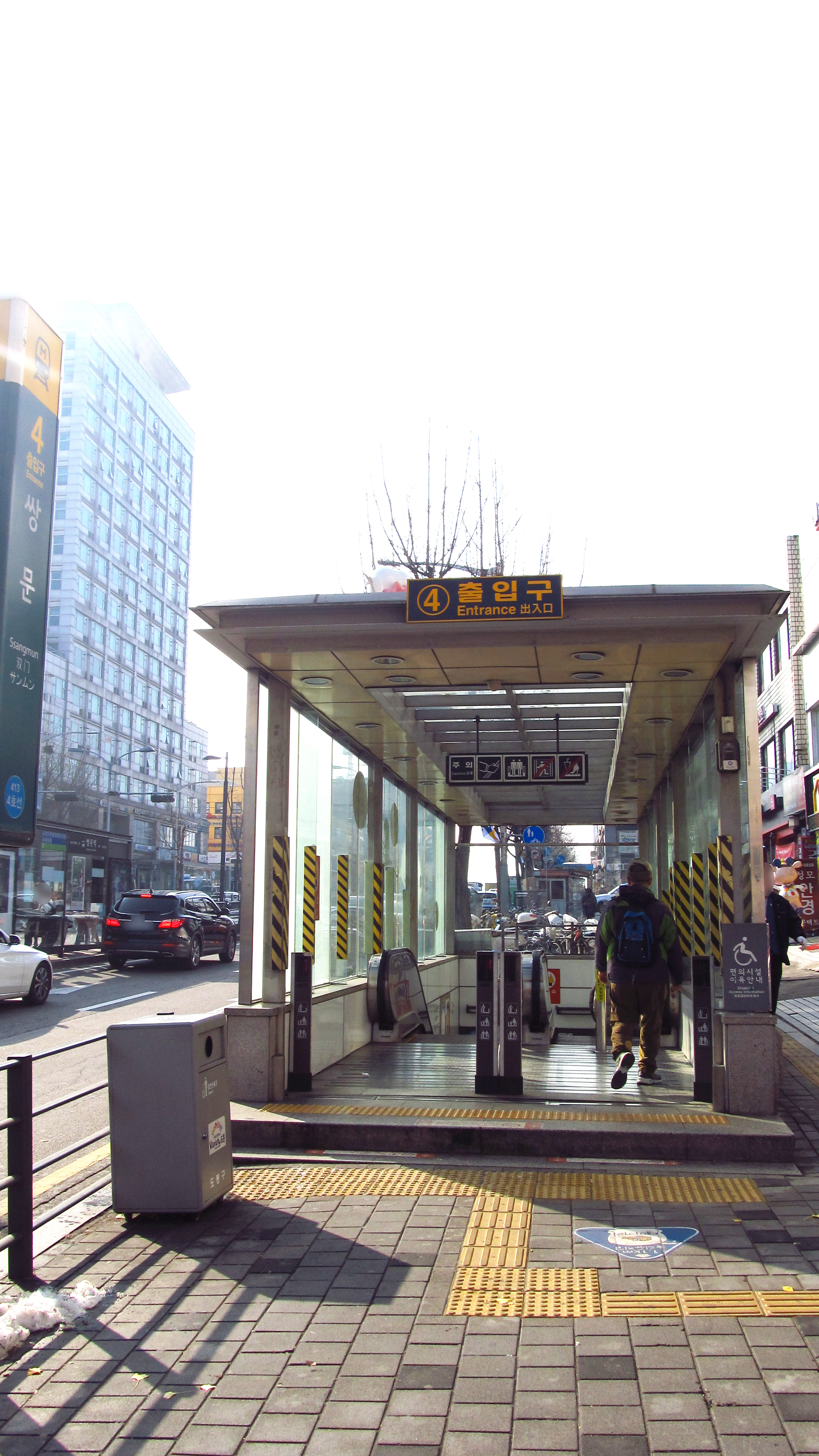
Exit 4

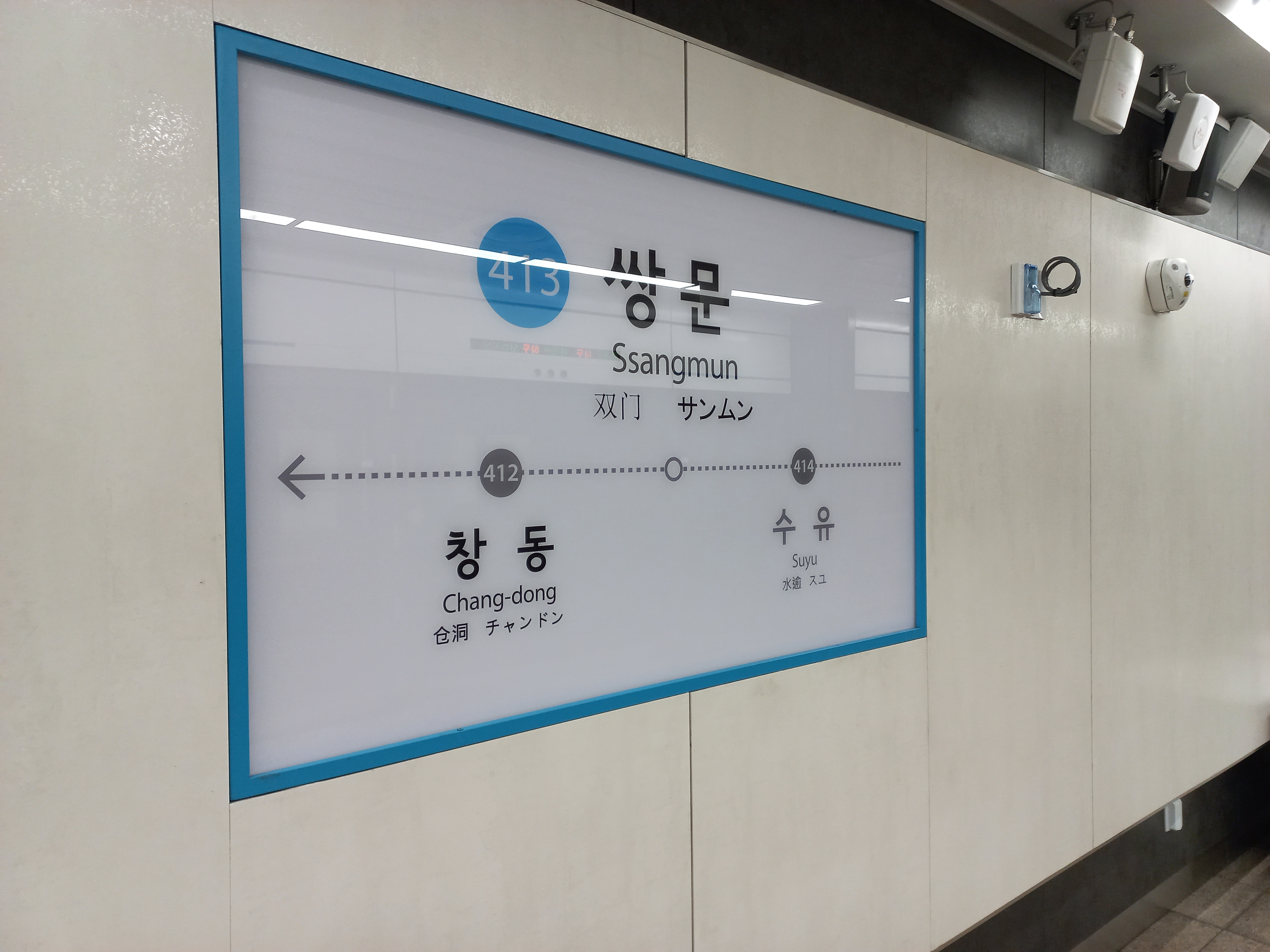
Station nameplate
