= Seongwoo Barbershop =

Oldest barbershop in Seoul, South Korea

Coordinates: 37.5495°N 126.9633°E

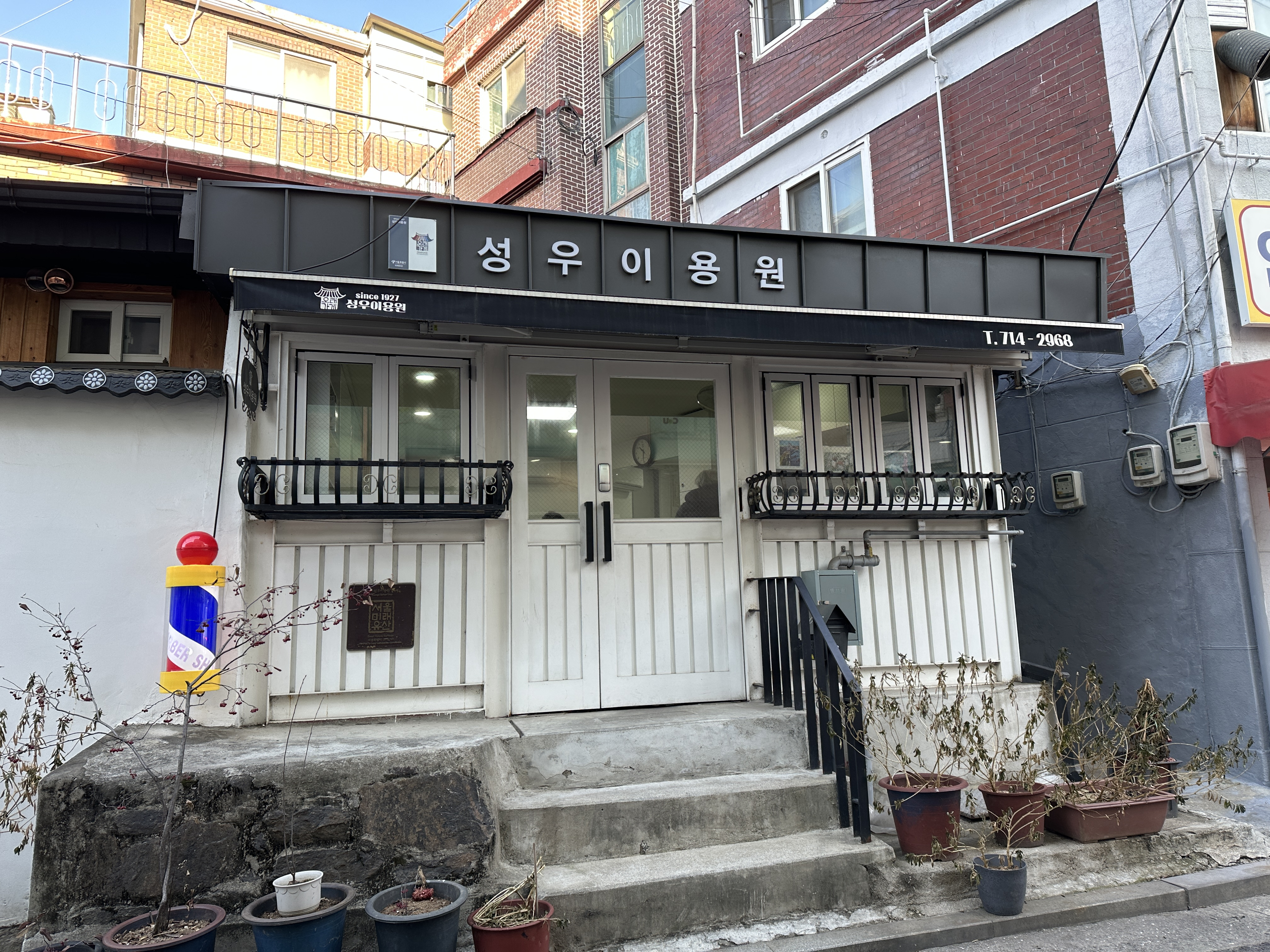
- The storefront (2025)
- Native name: 성우이용원
- Industry: Barbershop
- Founded: 1927
- Founder: Seo Jae-deok
- Headquarters: 4-1 Hyochangwon-ro 97-gil, Mapo District, Seoul, South Korea

Seoul Future Heritage
- Reference no.: 2013-161

Seongwoo Barbershop (Korean: 성우이용원; RR: Seongu iyongwon) is a historic barbershop in Seoul, South Korea. It is the oldest active barbershop in Seoul, having been founded in 1927. It has remained a family business, and as of 2024 was operated by the third generation of the family. The store opened and has since remained in the same location since its founding, although it was originally a thatched-roof hanok. The Seoul Metropolitan Government registered it as an Oraegage, a store of historic value, as well as a Seoul Future Heritage, and provided funds for reconstruction after typhoon damage caused the collapse of the historic facade in 2019.

The business was founded by Seo Jae-deok (서재덕), whom was reportedly the second person in Korea to obtain a barber license. Lee Seong-sun (이성순) was an employee at the barbershop; Seo took such a liking to him that he had Lee marry into the family, and he designated Lee as the successor. In 1935, Lee took over the business and renamed it (성우이발관; Seongu ibalgwan). In 1971, Lee's son Lee Nam-yeol (이남열) took over. The younger Lee had worked at the barbershop since he graduated from middle school in 1965. Some of the store's equipment has been used for most of the store's history, with a hair dryer dating back 90 years and a blade from 1934. The store was reportedly having difficulty securing a successor in 2019.

== See also ==
- Oraegage#List of Oraegage
