= Oraegage =

Designation for old stores in Seoul, South Korea

Oraegage (Korean: 오래가게), also stylized as OraeGage and translated to Seoul Historical Store, is a designation by the Seoul Metropolitan Government for long-running businesses. The program recognizes such businesses, offers them support, and provides information on them for tourists. It has been running since 2017.

The name of the program means literally "old store", but reportedly also has a meaning of "store that is wanted to be even older".

The program reportedly selects entries in its list by scouting the city, conducting interviews and verifying aspects of the business, and narrowing down candidates. Members of the list reportedly have been running for over 30 years or have been owned by at least two generations. Various types of businesses are included in the designation, including restaurants, pharmacies, book stores, beauty salons, and more.

== List of Oraegage ==
Oraegage
Name	Type	Established	District
Adamo Studio	Repair shop	1982	Seongdong
Awon Gongbang	Metalwork	1983	Jongno
Apple House	Restaurant	1987	Dongjak
Biwon Tteokjip	Tteok store	1949	Jongno
Bonghwa Mukjip	Restaurant	1982	Seongbuk
Brothers' Blacksmith Workshop	Blacksmith	c. 1970s	Eunpyeong
Bukchon Woodwork Workshop	Carpenter	1972	Jongno
Bulgwang Blacksmith Workshop	Blacksmith	1963	Eunpyeong
Chong Ro Tailor	Tailor	1916	Jung
Chunchusa	Tailor	1955	Seodaemun
Chung Won San Bang	Carpenter	1981	Jongno
Daegu Sesame Oil	Food store	1975	Jongno
Darak	Restaurant		Mapo
Deungchon Choewolseon Kalguksu	Restaurant	1984	Gangseo
Dok-Dabang	Coffeehouse	1971	Seodaemun
Dol Record	Record store	1975	Jung
Dongbu Goryeo Bakery	Bakery	1974	Jungnang
Donglim Knot Workshop	Crafts	2004 (Note: Craftspeople here have worked in the industry for longer.)	Jongno
Dongyang Bangatgan	Tteok store	1974	Jongno
Dream Handmade	Shoemaker		Seongdong
Elburim Tailorshop	Tailor	1975	Dongdaemun
Eulji Dabang	Coffeehouse	1985	Jung
Ewha Myeongju	Tailor	c. 1970s	Seocho
Figaro	Pub		Gwanak
Gaemi Supermarket	Grocery store	c. 1900s	Yongsan
Gami Bunsik	Restaurant	1975	Seodaemun
Gawon Craft Studio	Jade crafts	1974	Jongno
Geoan	Furniture makers	1981	Jongno
Geulbeot Books	Bookstore	1979	Mapo
Geumbok Store	Tailor	1978	Geumcheon
Gnal	Bookstore	1988	Gwanak
Gonghang Kalguksu	Restaurant	1979	Gangseo
Koohasanbang	Calligraphers	1913	Jongno
Gukseon Otchil	Lacquerware	1977	Jongno
Gyeonggi Tteokjip	Tteok store	1958	Mapo
HY Tailor	Tailor	1932	Jung
Hakrim Dabang	Coffeehouse	1956	Jongno
Haksa Billiards	Billiards hall	1967	Dongdaemun
Ham's Brot	Bakery	1999	Dobong
Haneul Mulbit	Dyeing	1973	Jongno
Hansin Pottery	Pottery	1967	Yongsan
Hapdeok Supermarket	Convenience store	1971	Yongsan
Hillstring	Musical instruments	1970	Seocho
Homi Art Shop	Art store	1975	Mapo
Hongik Books	Bookstore	1957	Seodaemun
Hwanghae Barbershop	Barbershop	1970	Gangbuk
Hwedula	Restaurant	1972	Seodaemun
Hyeseong Hair Shop	Barbershop	1979	Guro
Hyoja Bakery	Bakery	1987	Jongno
Hyoseong Oriental Medicine Clinic	Traditional medicine clinic	1984	Dongdaemun
Ingkko Tteokbokki	Restaurant	1978	Jungnang
Itaewon Books	Bookstore	1973	Yongsan
JS Shoes Design Lab	Shoemaker		Seongdong
Jasungdang Pharmacy	Pharmacy	1969	Gangseo
Jembroth Jewelry	Jewelry store	1984	Gangnam
Jidaebang	Tea shop	1982	Jongno
Kim Yong-an Patisserie	Bakery	1967	Yongsan
Koggiri	Restaurant	1986	Mapo
Kum Bak Yeon	Gold leaf art	1856	Jongno
Kyungeun Acoustic	Musical instruments	1987	Jongno
Kyungin Museum of Fine Art	Art museum	1983	Jongno
La Pluma & Bohemian	Coffeehouse	1990	Seongbuk
Lee Frameshop	Glasses store	1971	Yongsan
Mannadang	Confectionary store	1991	Gangnam
Men to Men Tailor Shop	Tailor	1983	Yeongdeungpo
Midopa Flower Cafe	Flower shop	1978	Yeongdeungpo
Mirim Bunsik	Restaurant	1988	Gwanak
Motungi Jip	Restaurant	1988	Gangnam
Myeongga Tteokjip	Tteok store	1980	Songpa
Myung Sin Dang Brush Store	Paintbrush maker	1932	Jongno
Naeja Peanuts	Food store	1974	Jongno
Nagwon Rice Cake	Tteok store	c. 1910s	Jongno
Napcheong Bronzeware	Metalwork	1986	Jongno
Napoleon Bakery	Bakery	1968	Seongbuk
Park Indang	Seal maker		Jongno
Peter Pan 1978	Bakery	1978	Seodaemun
Pyeongtaek Rice Store	Food store	1988	Geumcheon
Sahara	Restaurant	1988	Mapo
Sambowon	Buddhist goods store	1976	Jongno
Samu Chicken Center	Restaurant	1972	Yeongdeungpo
Samyangtang	Bathhouse	1972	Gangbuk
Sangsindang	Seal maker		Gangnam
Seolwha Hardware	Hardware store	1980	Dongjak
Seongwoo Barbershop	Barbershop	1927	Mapo
Seoul Record	Record store	1976	Jongno
Seoul Sanghoe	Food store	1971	Jung
Seoul Studio	Photography studio	1969	Gangbuk
Seowoo Bakery	Bakery	1980	Seocho
Seungjin Toy	Toy store	1980	Jongno
seven well	Shoemaker		Jung
Sinheung Sanghoe	Restaurant	1975	Yeongdeungpo
Sinrakwon	Restaurant	1965	Dongdaemun
Songlim Shoes	Shoemaker	1936	Jung
Sonmat Gimbap	Restaurant	1980	Jongno
Soonhee Food	Food store	1969	Jongno
Ssangma Studio	Photography studio		Yeongdeungpo
Suyu Fish Cake Factory	Food store	1974	Gangbuk
Taegeukdang	Bakery	1946	Jung
Talbang	Mask store	1984	Jongno
Teobangnae	Coffeehouse	1983	Dongjak
The Hangsangsoo Embroidery	Museum	1963	Seongbuk
Theater Sanwoollim	Theater company	1969	Mapo
Tong-in Store	Art gallery	1924	Jongno
Tongmungwan	Book store	1934	Jongno
Yemoonsa	Seal maker		Jung
Yeonhee Photo Studio	Photography studio	c. 1950s	Seodaemun
Yuil Oriental Medicine Clinic	Traditional medicine clinic	1945	Jongno

== See also ==
- Seoul Future Heritage
- List of oldest restaurants in South Korea
