= Tongmungwan =

Oldest active book store in South Korea

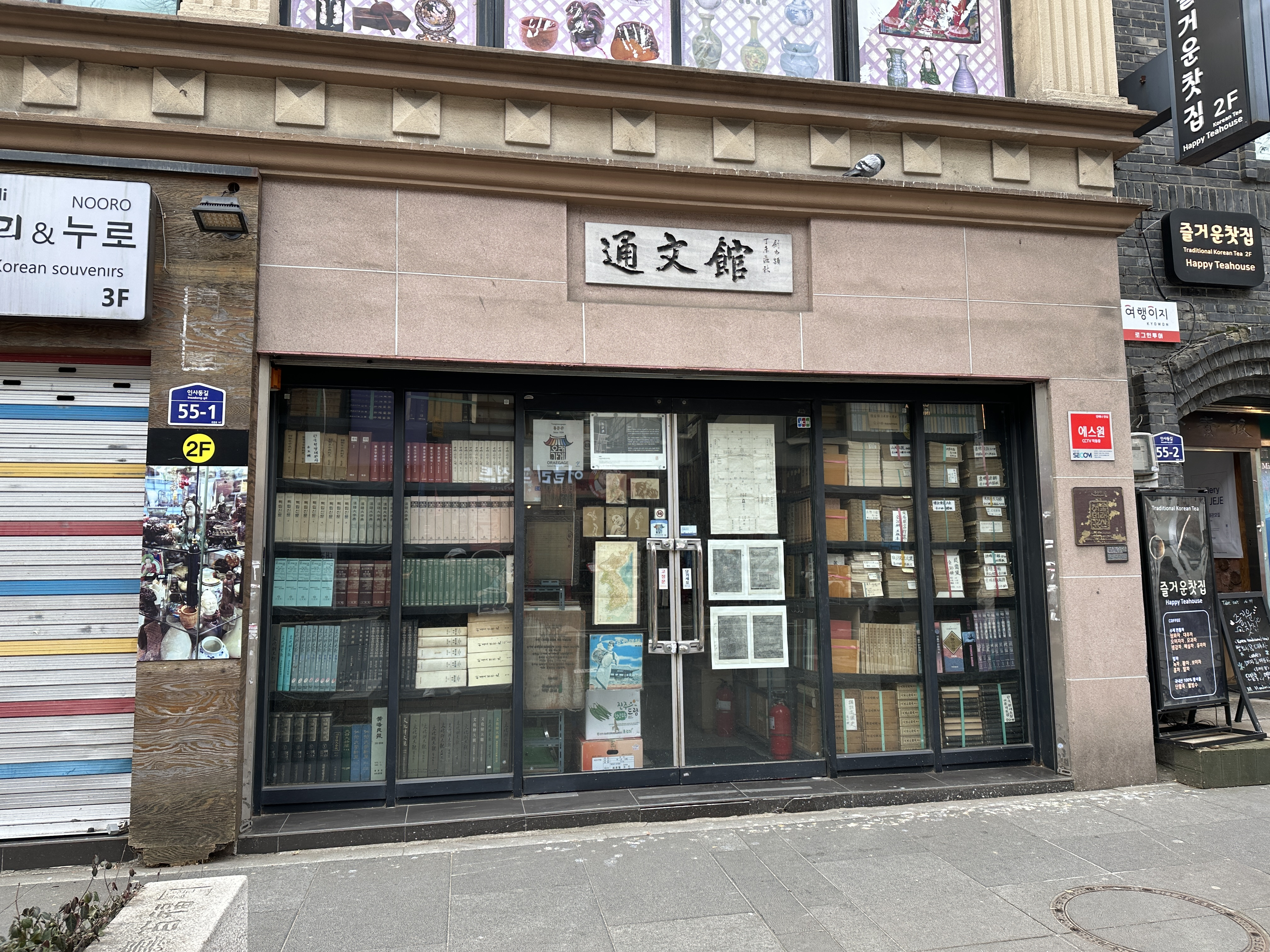
- The store (2025)
- Native name: 통문관
- Industry: Antique and rare books
- Founded: 1934; 92 years ago
- Founder: Lee Gyeom-ro
- Headquarters: 55-1 Insadong-gil, Jongno District, Seoul, South Korea

Seoul Future Heritage
- Reference no.: 2013-256
- Website: tongmunkwan.co.kr (in Korean)

Tongmungwan or Tongmunkwan (Korean: 통문관; Hanja: 通文館) is a historic book store in Seoul, South Korea. It is the oldest active book store in the country, having been founded in 1934. It has remained a family business since its establishment. It has served mainly academics, and reportedly has had a significant impact in the study of Korean history. The business was designated a Seoul Future Heritage in 2013. It is also an Oraegage, a store of historic value.

== Description ==
The predecessor to the book store was called Geummundang (금문당). In 1934, 25 year old employee Lee Gyeom-ro (이겸로; 李謙魯) acquired the business and renamed it Geumhakdang (금학당; 金港堂). The store received its current name in 1945; it is named for a Goryeo-era government office. Upon the outbreak of the 1950–1953 Korean War, Lee fled with an 80-volume set of books that documented the military history of Joseon for safekeeping. Lee became a famed collector of rare books. In 1961, he discovered a copy of the Wŏlinsŏkpo. He donated it to Yonsei University. He also located royal documents that had been stolen from the Academy of Korean Studies, as well as an original volume of the Samguk yusa. He donated such texts to university libraries. He died in 2006 at the age of 97. The third generation owner, Lee Jong-un (이종운), took over the business in 1998.

Its clientele is reportedly mostly academics; it was reportedly frequented by notable Korean intellectuals, including historian Choe Nam-seon, linguist Lee Hee-seung, and art historian Kim Won-yong. It reportedly made significant contributions to the study of Korean history, and served as a forum for the exchange of ideas between intellectuals. The store reportedly has a total of 60,000 to 70,000 items in its collection, with only around 30,000 on display in the store. It has a manuscript signed by John R. Hodge, who oversaw the U.S. occupation of Korea. It has copies of the historic Korean newspaper Tongnip sinmun. It reportedly began selling more general books by the 2010s, in order to afford the higher rent costs in Insa-dong.

== See also ==
- Oraegage#List of Oraegage
- Dongyang Bookstore – another historic bookstore in Seoul
