= GreatList =

- Company type: Private
- Founded: 2022
- Key people: Alexander Sysoev
- Website: greatlist.ru

GreatList is an international restaurant guide launched by Russian restaurateur Alexander Sysoev. Available in Russian, English, Arabic and Chinese, it operates in Russia, the UAE, and Qatar.

== History ==
The project was launched in 2022 and initially covered 4 major cities in Russia, including Moscow, St. Petersburg, Yekaterinburg and Kazan. Then Nizhny Novgorod was added to the list.

In 2024, the restaurant guide was launched in the UAE, its experts selected more than a hundred locations in the categories of fine dining, smart casual, city cafes, coffee shops, and bars. Within 2 months of its opening, the guide was visited by 1.5 million visitors, 90% of which were local residents and foreign tourists, 10% were tourists from Russia. A special GreatList sign was placed at the entrances to popular restaurants in the UAE.

In December 2024, the guide was launched in the two largest cities in the Russian Far East, Khabarovsk and Vladivostok. The guide included 12 establishments selected by experts. The entry into the region took place with the support of the Far East and Arctic Development Corporation.

In 2025, the GreatList was launched in Qatar. The guide's experts selected 25 best places in the capital of Qatar, Doha, in the categories of fine dining, smart casual, city cafes, and bars. The project team conducted anonymous visits to various establishments in Doha to evaluate them, highlighting the best in terms of food, service, design, and atmosphere.

A series of GreatList Sessions tours is planned for 2025. Russian chefs will visit the Middle East, while chefs from the UAE and Qatar will exchange experiences with colleagues from Russia.

== Structure ==
The guide's establishments are divided into three sections:

- Fine Dining — which includes the best restaurants in terms of haute cuisine, design and service,
- Smart Casual — which includes stylish, modern places with a memorable atmosphere and excellent food,
- City Cafe — in the category of excellent establishments for every day with affordable prices.

Additionally (for some cities):

- Bars and Streetfood — the best bars in cities famous for their nightlife, as well as places with authentic fast food dishes.
- Coffee.
- Hotels.

== Selection criteria ==
In order for a certain place to be included in the GreatList, the team visits it several times, at different times of the day.

There are important selection criteria, including the quality of the food and the ingenuity of the chef, service, which involves not only serving the guest, but also the design of the establishment, the ergonomics of the space, the atmosphere, which includes dozens of elements: from smells to music.

== Awards ==
- Winner of the Moscow Urban Forum Awards: "City Services", 2023.
- Prize "For Contribution to Tourism Development" of the Tourism Department's "Guiding Star" award, Alexander Sysoev's project - Great List, 2023.
- Certificate of Gratitude from the UAE Embassy in the Russian Federation for active participation in the Days of Culture of the United Arab Emirates, 2024.
- Gratitude from the Mayor of Moscow S. Sobyanin for his contribution to the development of the restaurant industry and gastronomic tourism in Moscow, 2024.

== See also ==
- Food critic
- The World's 50 Best Restaurants
- Restaurant rating
