= Itaewon Books =

Bookstore in Seoul, South Korea

Coordinates: 37.5362°N 126.9872°E

- Formerly: Itaewon Foreign Bookstore
- Industry: Secondhand books
- Founded: 1973; 53 years ago
- Founder: Choi Ki-woong
- Headquarters: 208 Noksapyeong-daero, Yongsan District, Seoul, South Korea

Seoul Future Heritage
- Reference no.: 2015-041
- Website: instagram.com/itaewon_books

Itaewon Books (Korean: 이태원북스), formerly Itaewon Foreign Bookstore, is a secondhand bookstore in Itaewon, Seoul, South Korea that specializes in English-language books. Founded in 1973, it is the oldest English-only secondhand bookstore in Seoul. It is designated Seoul Future Heritage and has remained a family business.

It was founded by Choi Ki-woong, who continued to operate the business until 2011. He had been trading books since the 1960s, although then without a storefront. He gathered texts he could find that were in English, including American department store catalogues, novels, and magazines and sold them to bookstores in Seoul. He used a handcart for transporting the books. In 1985, the store moved locations. A 2024 article reported that Choi's daughter Choi Mi-ra was the owner of the business.

== See also ==
- Dongyang Bookstore – one of the oldest active bookstores in Seoul
