= Koohasanbang =

Historic calligraphy store in Seoul, South Korea

Coordinates: 37.5726°N 126.9856°E

- Industry: Calligraphy supplies
- Founded: 1913; 113 years ago
- Headquarters: 11 Insadong 5-gil, Jongno District, Seoul, South Korea

Seoul Future Heritage
- Reference no.: 2013-024
- Website: koohasanbang.com

Koohasanbang (Korean: 구하산방; Hanja: 九霞山房), also spelled Guhasanbang, is a historic calligraphy supplies store (필방; 筆房; pilbang) in Seoul, South Korea. It is the reportedly the first dedicated calligraphy supplies store in Korea, having been founded in 1913. It has been designated an Oraegage and Seoul Future Heritage by the Seoul Metropolitan Government.

The store has been in downtown Seoul for over a century. It moved locations several times within downtown Seoul. The store reportedly supplied brushes to the Korean emperors Gojong and Sunjong. It also reportedly supplied a number of famous Korean calligraphers and artists over time. The store reportedly produces over 500 varieties of ink brushes, with the tips made of different materials.

== See also ==
- Oraegage#List of Oraegage
