= Chong Ro Tailor =

Historic tailor shop in Seoul, South Korea

- Native name: 종로양복점
- Industry: Tailor
- Founded: 1916; 109 years ago
- Headquarters: 04551 Room 618, Eulji Biz-Center, 78 Jeo-dong 2(i)-ga, Jung District, Seoul, South Korea

Seoul Future Heritage
- Reference no.: 2013-238
- Website: www.bellstreet.co.kr

Chong Ro Tailor (Korean: 종로양복점; Hanja: 鍾路洋服店), also spelled Jongno Tailor, is a historic tailor shop in Seoul, South Korea. It is among the oldest active tailor shops in South Korea, having been founded in 1916. It has remained a family business since then, and is currently operated by the third generation of the family. The Seoul Metropolitan Government has designated it an Oraegage, a store of historic value, and a Seoul Future Heritage.

The store was founded in 1916, near Bosingak in Jongno District. Its founder was Lee Du-yong (이두용), whom studied tailoring in Japan. In the 1940s, the store was moved to Jongno 1-ga. It moved again in 2000 amidst redevelopment in the area, and again in 2010 to its current location.

The store makes custom suits for its customers. Over time, it reportedly became a favorite spot for South Korean politicians, including South Korean leader Park Chung Hee, Kim Du-han, Yi Si-yeong, and more.

== See also ==
- Oraegage#List of Oraegage
