= Napcheong Bronzeware =

South Korean metalworking company

- Native name: 납청놋전
- Industry: Bronzeworking
- Founded: 1956
- Headquarters: Seoul, South Korea
- Website: napcheong.com

Napcheong Bronzeware (Korean: 납청놋전; Hanja: 納淸놋전), also called Napcheong Yugi (납청유기), is a South Korean metalworking company that produces the traditional Korean craft bangjja (bronzeware). The company sells handmade bronze pieces for culinary usage, decorative usage, and for instruments such as the kkwaenggwari (gong). It is classified as an Oraegage, a historic store, by the Seoul Metropolitan Government.

The company reports to having been founded in 1956 by Bong Ju Lee (이봉주). Lee was born in 1926, in an area of Chongju called Napchŏng (from which the company receives its name); this area is now in North Korea. He fled to South Korea in 1948. In 1983, in recognition of his craftsmanship, he was designated Living National Treasure No. 77 by the South Korean government. Lee's son reportedly took over the business after his father retired.

Since 1986, the company has had a store in Seoul's Insa-dong neighborhood. Lee also donated 1,500 pieces of his work to the city of Daegu; these works are now on display in the Daegu Bangjja Yugi Museum. When United States President George W. Bush visited South Korea in 2002, the South Korean presidential residence the Blue House used tableware made by Napcheong at a state dinner for Bush; a tableware set was given to Bush after his visit.
