= Seogye-dong =

- Interactive map of Seogye-dong
- Country: South Korea

Area
  - Total: 2.52 km^{2} (0.97 sq mi)

Korean name
- Hangul: 서계동
- Hanja: 西界洞
- RR: Seogye-dong
- MR: Sŏgye-dong

Seogye-dong (Korean: 서계동) is a dong (neighbourhood) of Yongsan District, Seoul, South Korea. It is a legal dong (법정동 法定洞) administered under its administrative dong, Cheongpa 1-dong.

The historic grocery store Gaemi Supermarket is located in the dong.

== See also ==
- Administrative divisions of South Korea
