= Bangjja =

Korean bronzeware

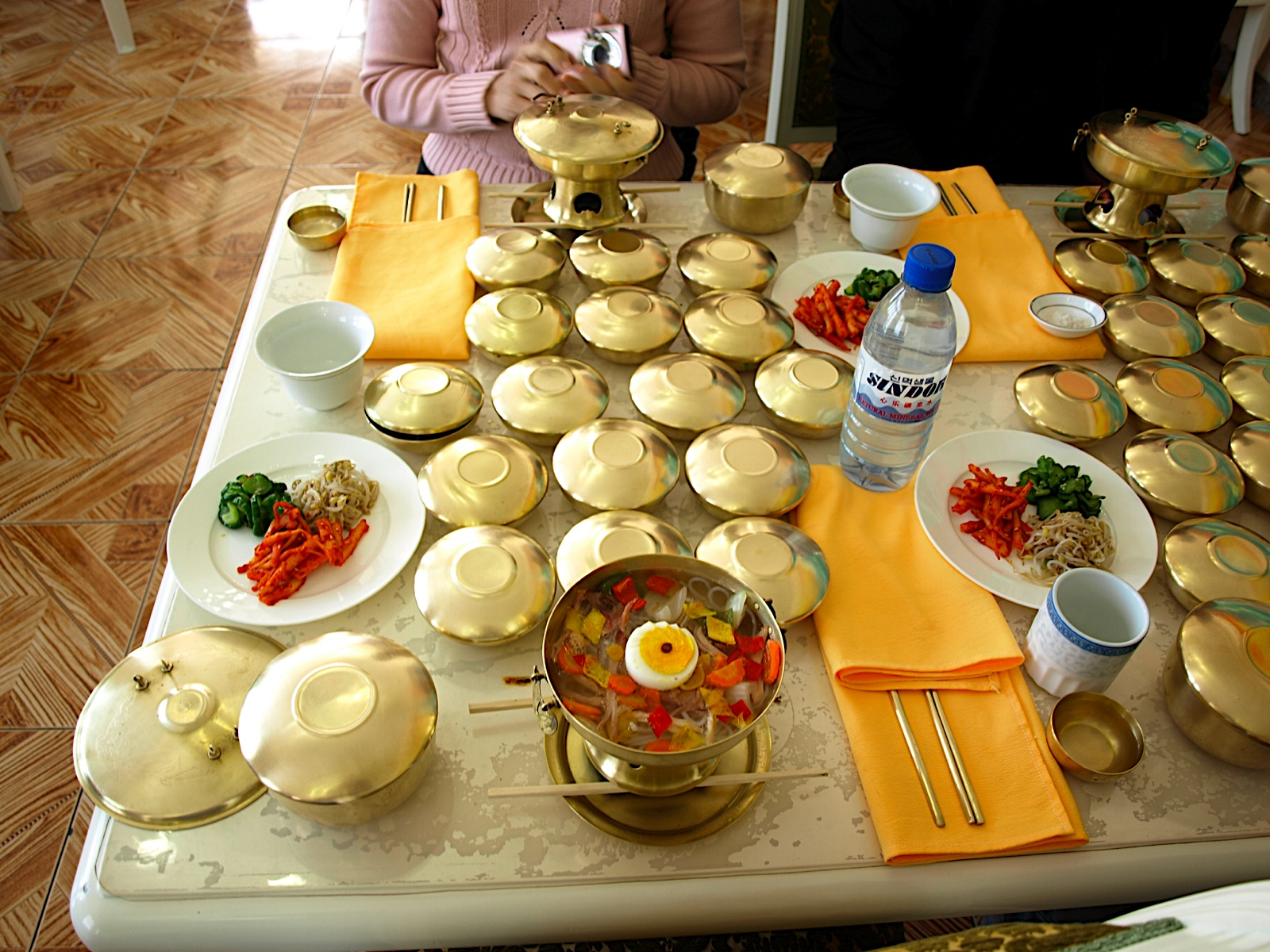
- Bangjja ware used to serve various food at a restaurant in Kaesong, North Korea.

Korean name
- Hangul: 방짜; 놋그릇; 유기
- Hanja: (none); (none); 鍮器
- RR: bangjja; notgeureut; yugi
- MR: pangtcha; notkŭrŭt; yugi
- IPA: [paŋ.t͈ɕa]; [not̚.k͈ɯ.ɾɯt̚]; [ju.ɡi]

Bangjja (Korean: 방짜), also called notgeureut (놋그릇) or yugi (Korean: 유기; Hanja: 鍮器), is a Korean type of hand-forged bronzeware. A complete set of bangjja includes dishes, bowls, spoons, and chopsticks. The main difference between Korean bronzeware or bangjja from other bronzeware is the alloy ratio between copper and tin. The bangjja contains much more tin than other bronzewares (Cu:Sn = 78:22 as volume) while the normal ratio of tin to copper is 1/9. Due to this compositional difference, bangjja (unlike other kinds of bronzeware) can be sterilized. For this reason, it has historically been used as tableware for the royal families of Korea. Bangjja is used for the traditional presentation of Korean royal court cuisine (surasang). In 1983, the government of South Korea officially designated bangjja as an Important Intangible Cultural Property.

== History ==
Bangjja bronzeware reflects its deep historical value as well as traditional fashion of Korea. The history of bangjja originates from the Bronze Age and it was widely used to make a variety of tools, tableware and ceremonial products. The Ordos region of northern China's bronze culture (related to Scythian Bronze Culture) was spread to several regions including Korean territory.

During the Goryeo period, when they frequently traded with China, royalties and nobles used thin bronze tableware made with bangjja technique.

In the period of Chosun dynasty, the country greatly supported mining and established many brassware plants in local territories. Although, people in this era generally used porcelains, upper-class people continued using bronzeware similar to the Goryeo period. As time passed, middle class people started using bronzeware more often and many markets formed across the country.

At the end of modern age, most of the households bronzeware was ravished by Japan, and they were melted down for their metal during World War II. With the liberation in 1945, bronzeware became widely used again, but soon after the Korean War, when briquettes took place, people preferred stainless steel bowls to bronzeware because bronzeware gets easily discolored by briquettes gas.

In reversal, nowadays, through various chemical experiments, bangjja bronzeware is becoming well known for its O-157 sterilization function, anti-microbial properties, and detection of pesticides. Also its heat retention rate turned out to be higher than porcelains and stainless bowls. Bangjja is currently used for making instruments, tableware, and other various goods.

== Characteristics ==
When bangjja bronzeware is made, a mass of alloy of copper and tin is heated with fire and gets hammered several times. The proportion of tin in bangjja bronzeware is very high compared to general bronze bowls.

In general, iron becomes more firm when it is quenched after being heated in fire over 600 degree. However, bangjja bronzeware becomes softer as it is heated. This is another mystery of brassware. Several people form a circle around the ingot and start hammering to form the metal into a plate. One special thing about the process is that they do not use ready-made mold machine, instead they repeat the process of hammering and heating as they are making the shape of bronzeware.

== Today's bangjja ==
Bangjja bronzeware produced by handed down traditional techniques are not bent or easily broken. Furthermore, with more usage, it becomes burnished without any discoloration. Recent reports about various experiments revealed that bangjja bronzeware contains a sterilization function and detects pesticides. Bangjja bronzeware, now called "bowl of mystery" shows its great heat retention, which is far greater than other tableware made with other materials. It is also commonly used as a material for percussion instruments like the tam-tam, hobnail, and gong.

Several people form a well organized group to produce bangjja and it requires complicated and highly skilled techniques to be done, which makes bangjja more distinctive. Bangjja products are used not only as simple household supplies, but also as works of art, which depicts the traditional customs of Korea. The value of bangjja bronzeware is highly respected. Bangjja artisan Lee Bong Ju, who was appointed as Important Intangible Cultural Property in 1983, has his works sold at his company Napcheong Bronzeware. Many of his works are now exhibited at Daegu Bangjja Bronzeware Museum.
