= Gaemi Supermarket =

Historic grocery store in Seoul, South Korea

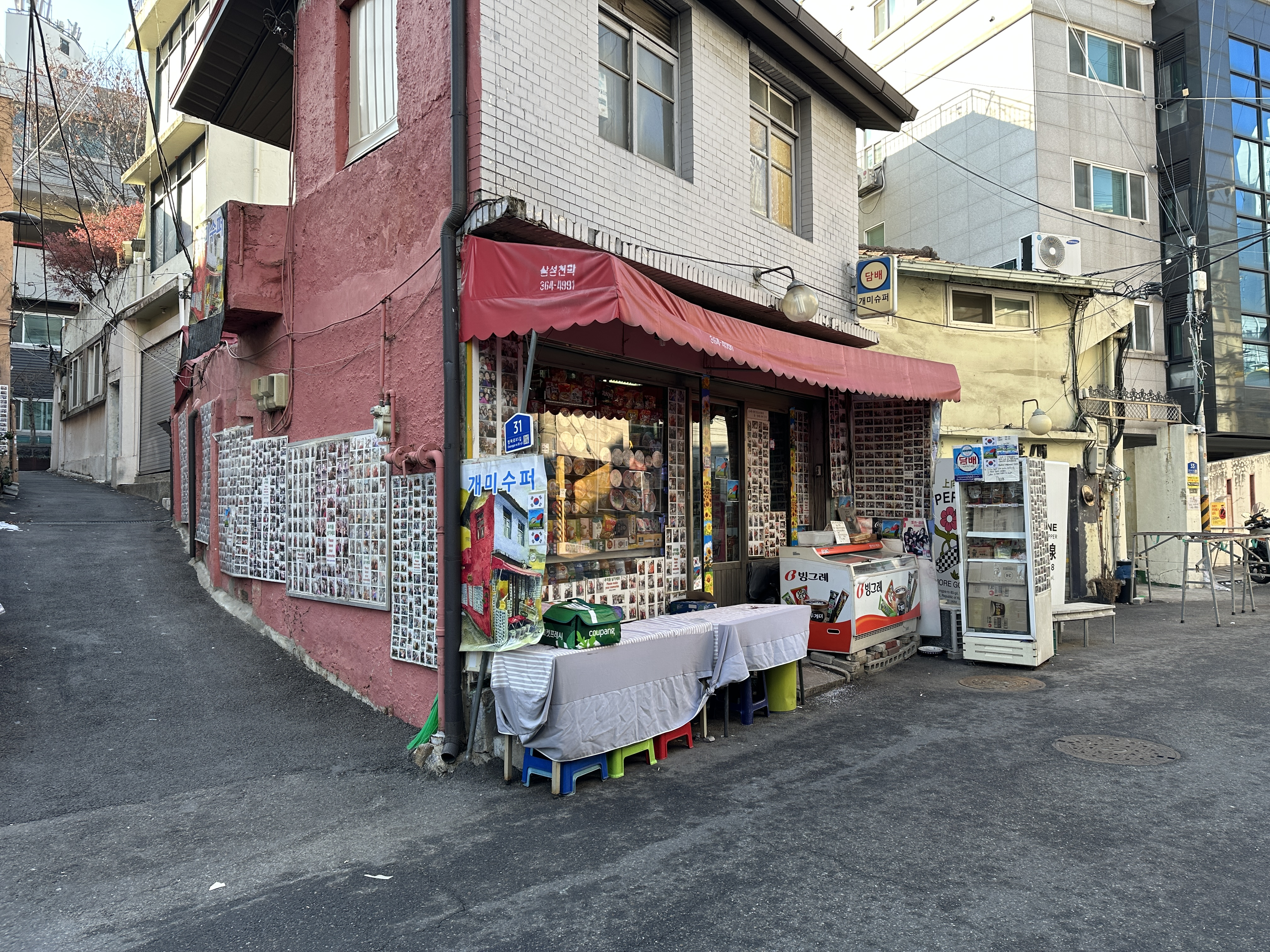
- Gaemi Supermarket (2025)
- Native name: 개미슈퍼
- Industry: Grocery store
- Founded: c. 1900s
- Headquarters: 31 Cheongpa-ro 85ga-gil, Yongsan District, Seoul, South Korea

Gaemi Supermarket (Korean: 개미슈퍼; lit. ant supermarket) is a historic neighborhood grocery store in Seogye-dong, Yongsan District, Seoul, South Korea. It has been in continuous operation since the 1900s, and has become a tourist attraction for the city. In 2018, it was designated an Oraegage, a historic business, by the Seoul Metropolitan Government.

The store once served the surrounding sewing industry in the area. After the sewing industry declined in the 2000s, the store's prospects also declined. However, beginning around the 2010s, it reportedly became a popular tourist attraction among foreign visitors to Korea. A nearby wall displays numerous photos the store's own took with visitors. The Seoul government also made it a part of a walking tour course from the nearby Seoul Station, and provided assistance in decorating the store and preparing it for foreign visitors.

As of 2017, the store's owner was Cha Hyo-bun (차효분). Cha was born in the area and lived just across from the supermarket; she grew up visiting the store. She is the fifth person to own the store. Her friendliness and habit of taking and posting photos with visitors is reportedly a significant reason for why the store is liked by both tourists and locals.

== See also ==
- Oraegage#List of Oraegage
