= Tong-in Store =

Art store and gallery in Seoul, South Korea

- Native name: 통인가게
- Industry: Art and antiques
- Founded: 1924
- Founder: Kim Jeong-hwan
- Headquarters: 32 Insadong-gil, Jongno District, Seoul, South Korea
- Website: tonginstore.net (in Korean, English)

Tong-in Store (Korean: 통인가게), also called The Store from TONG-IN, is a historic art store and gallery in Seoul, South Korea. It began as an antique shop in 1924 and opened Tong-in Gallery in 1975. It has remained a family business since its founding; as of 2021 the owner was the son of the founder. It opened a New York City branch in 2002. The Seoul Metropolitan Government designated it an Oraegage, a store of historic value.

The store's founder was Kim Jeong-hwan (김정환). Kim was of the prestigious Andong Kim clan, which once held many government posts. With the collapse of the Korean government and the beginning of the Japanese colonial period, the family lost their posts. Kim started his career by selling women's jewelry for Japanese customers. From there, he began trading furniture and ceramics. This led to the founding of the store, first as Tong-in Furniture Store (통인가구점), in 1924, in Tongin-dong. He eventually passed the store onto his son, Kim Wan-gyu (김완규), who was then age 23. In 1962, the store moved from Tongin-dong to Insa-dong. The younger Kim expanded the business to include a variety of other services, including international and domestic safe shipping and document storage. They built a new store front in 1973; at the time the building was reportedly considered cutting edge, and was the tallest building in the area. The store reportedly became a frequent destination for foreign dignitaries to Korea. American banker David Rockefeller visited the store in 1974, during the Park Chung Hee administration; Rockefeller purchased paintings of Mount Kumgang. The store reportedly became a center of culture and art; artists regularly congregated at the store, and prominent patrons like Samsung founder Lee Byung-chul frequently visited to expand their collections. The store also holds cultural shows, including pansori (Korean traditional music) performances.

The store has five floors above ground and a basement floor. The basement and fifth floor serve as galleries. The first floor has crafts, the second has traditional crafts, the third furniture, and the fourth antiques.

== See also ==
- Oraegage#List of Oraegage
