= Chang-dong station =

Seoul Subway station

Coordinates: 37°39′09″N 127°02′49″E

창동; Chang-dong
창동; Chang-dong
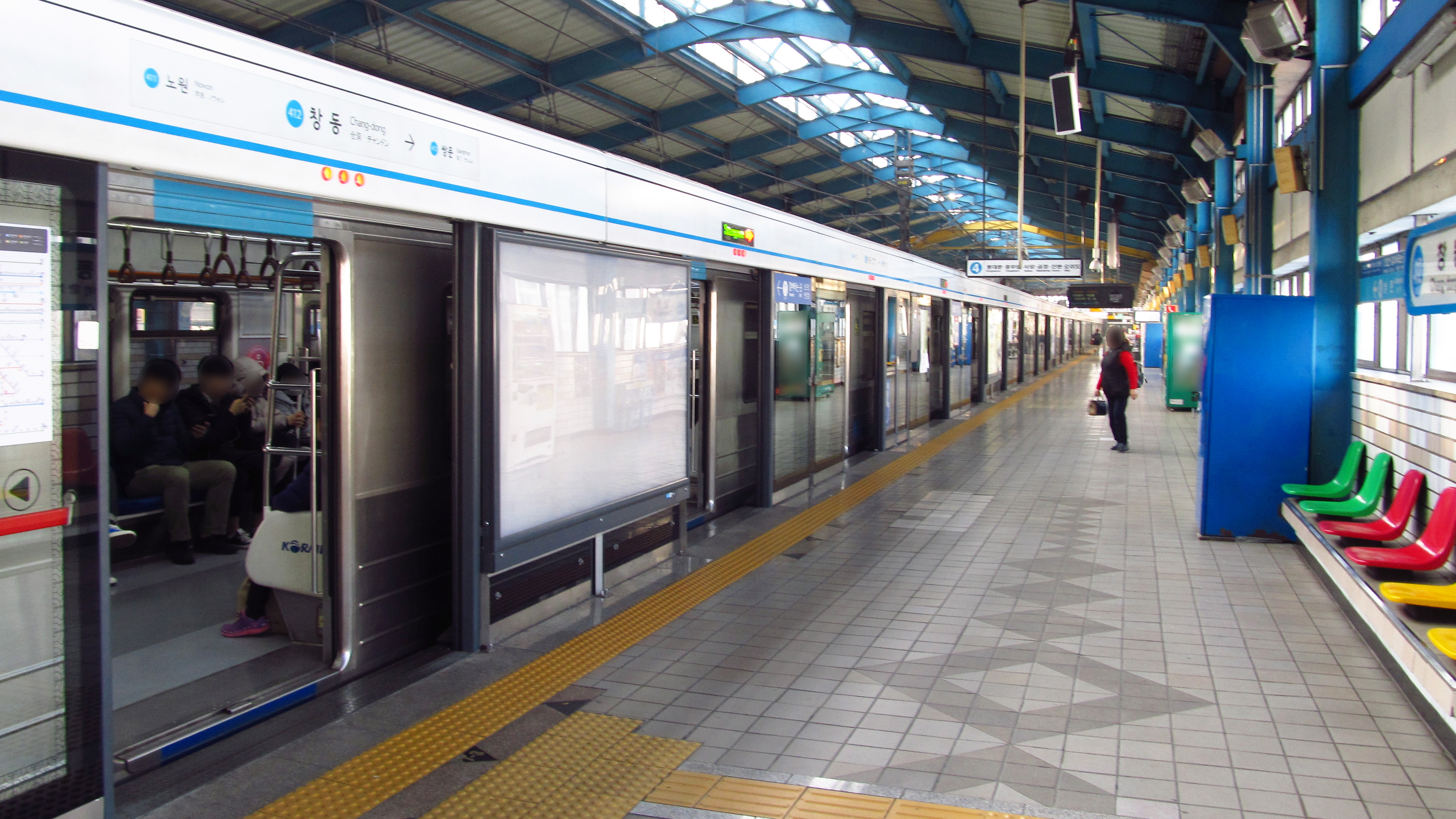
- Station platform (Line 4)

Korean name
- Hangul: 창동역
- Hanja: 倉洞驛
- Revised Romanization: Changdong-yeok
- McCune–Reischauer: Ch'angdong-yŏk

General information
- Location: 77 Madeul-ro 11-gil, Dobong-gu, Seoul
- Operator: Korail, Seoul Metro
- Lines: Line 1 Line 4
- Platforms: 4
- Tracks: 6

Construction
- Structure type: Aboveground

History
- Opened: October 15, 1911

Key dates
- August 22, 1985: Line 1 opened
- April 20, 1985: Line 4 opened

Passengers
- (Daily) Based on Jan-Dec of 2012. Line 4: 65,938
Services
Preceding station	Seoul Metropolitan Subway	Following station
Banghak towards Yeoncheon	Line 1	Nokcheon towards Incheon
Dobongsan towards Dongducheon	Line 1 Gyeongwon Express	Kwangwoon University towards Incheon
Nowon towards Jinjeop	Line 4	Ssangmun towards Oido
Location

Chang-dong Station is a station on Seoul Subway Line 1 and Line 4. It is located in Chang-dong, Dobong District, Seoul, South Korea. A shopping center was planned for this site, but the empty lot has never been developed due to the bankruptcy of the contractor behind said project. The station is, however, home to a cluster of pojangmacha stalls.

== History ==
Chang-dong Station was opened on October 15, 1911 as part of the first segment of the Gyeongwon Line. The Line 4 station opened on April 20, 1985, while Line 1 service was extended northwards from Kwangwoon Univ. to Chang-dong Station on August 22, 1985.

== Exits ==
- Exit 1: Nogok Middle School, Nowon-gu Office, Dobong Police Station, Dobong-gu Office Annex, Sanggye High School, Seoul Wolcheon Elementary School, Eunhyeganho Hagwon, Jawoon Elementary School, Chang 4-dong Community Center, Chang 4-dong Protection Center, Hi Mart Chang-dong, Jawoon High School, Donga Cheongsol Apartment House
- Exit 2: Dobong-gu Office, Dobong Registry Office, Donga Green Apartment House, Seoul Bukbu District Office of Education, E-Mart Chang-dong, Chang 4-dong Catholic Church, Seoul Changdong Elementary School

== Gallery ==
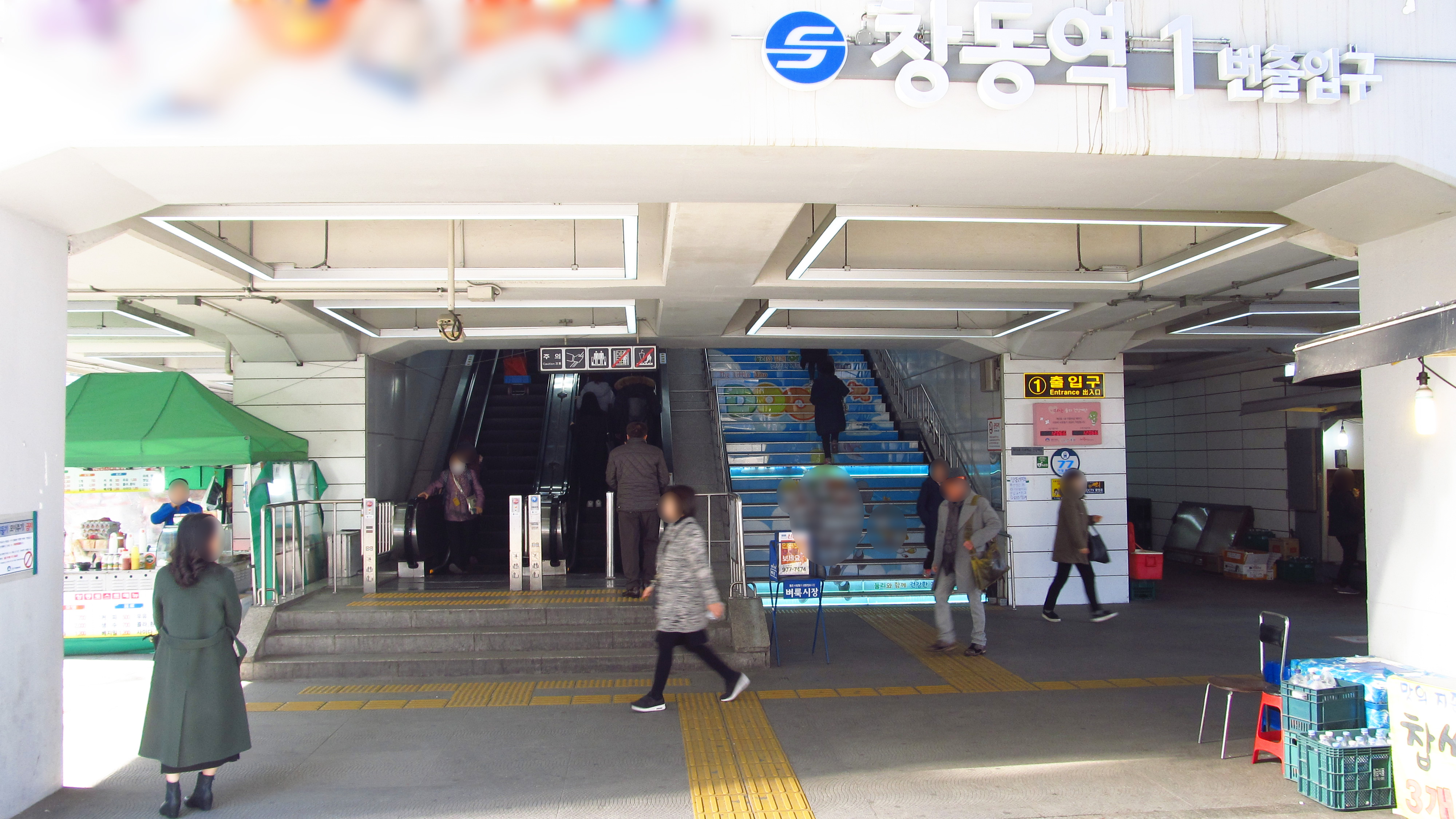
Exit 1

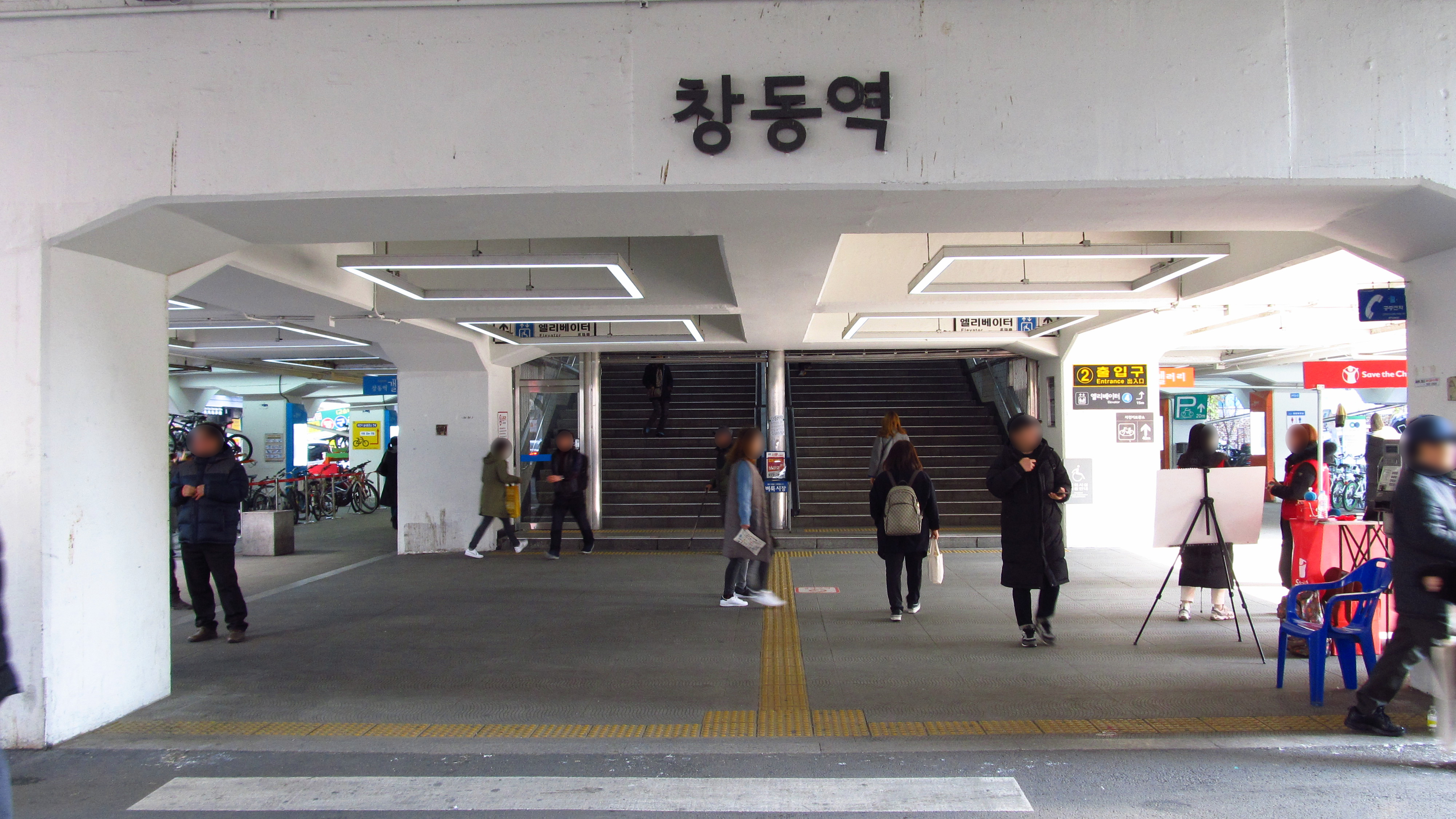
Exit 2

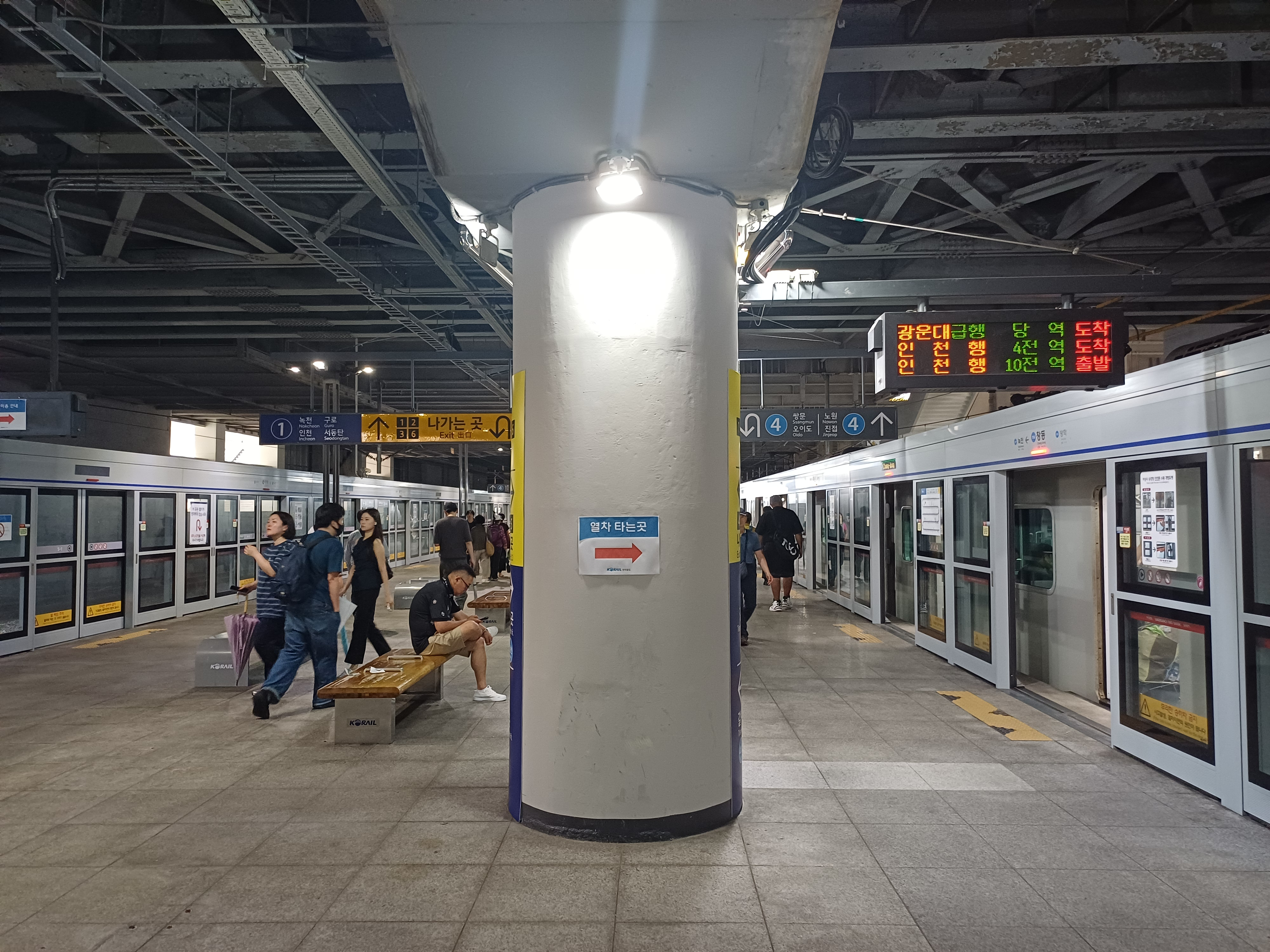
Station platforms (Line 1)
