= Banghak-dong =

Coordinates: 37.667°N 127.034°E

- Neighbourhood
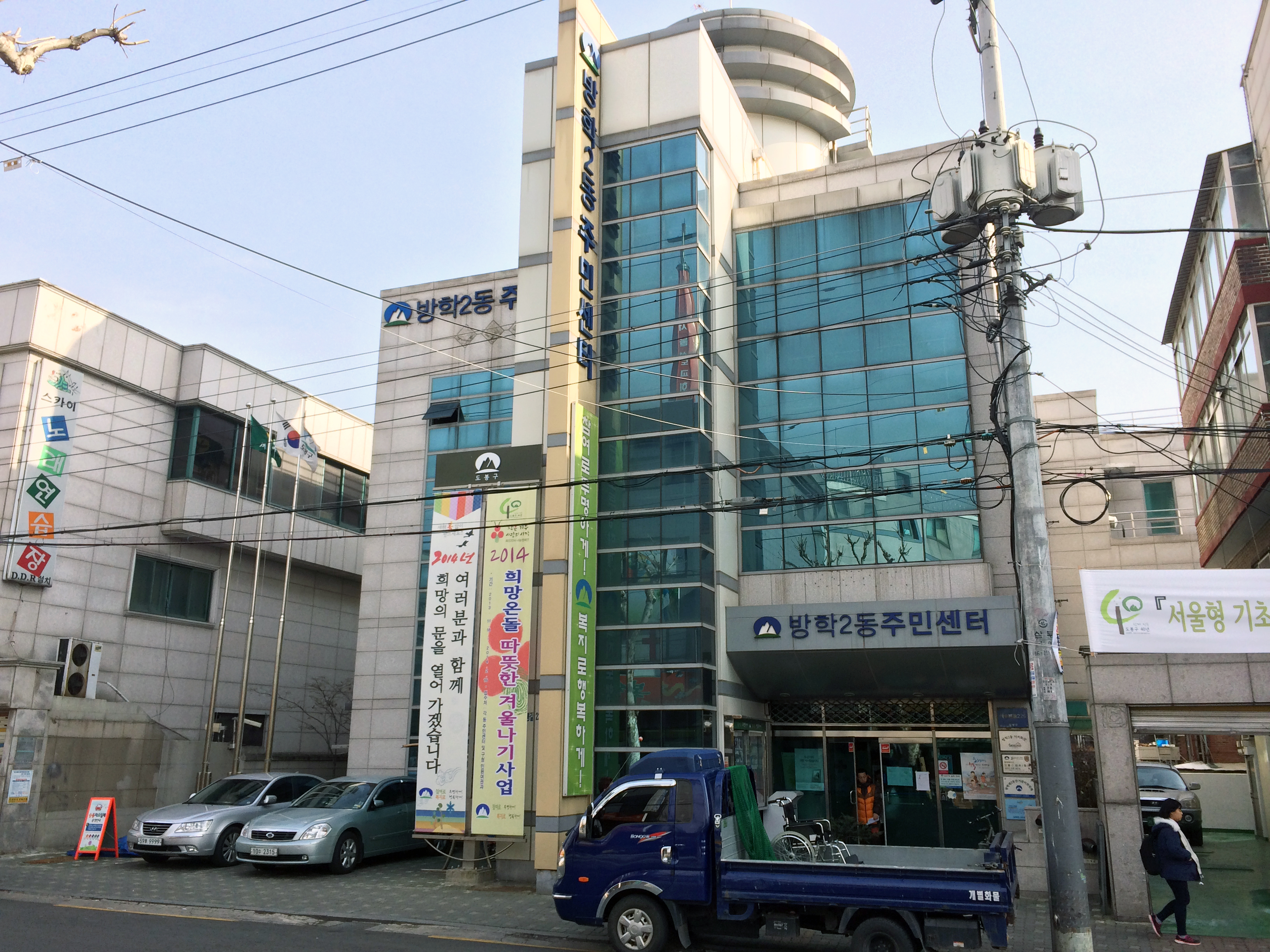
- Banghakjei-dong Community Service Center

- Country: South Korea

Area
  - Total: 4.07 km^{2} (1.57 sq mi)

Population (2010)
  - Total: 89,855
  - Density: 22,100/km^{2} (57,200/sq mi)

Korean name
- Hangul: 방학동
- Hanja: 放鶴洞
- RR: Banghak-dong
- MR: Panghak-tong

Banghak-dong (Korean: 방학동) is a dong (neighborhood) of Dobong District, Seoul, South Korea.
