= Restaurant rating =

Used to identify restaurants according to their quality

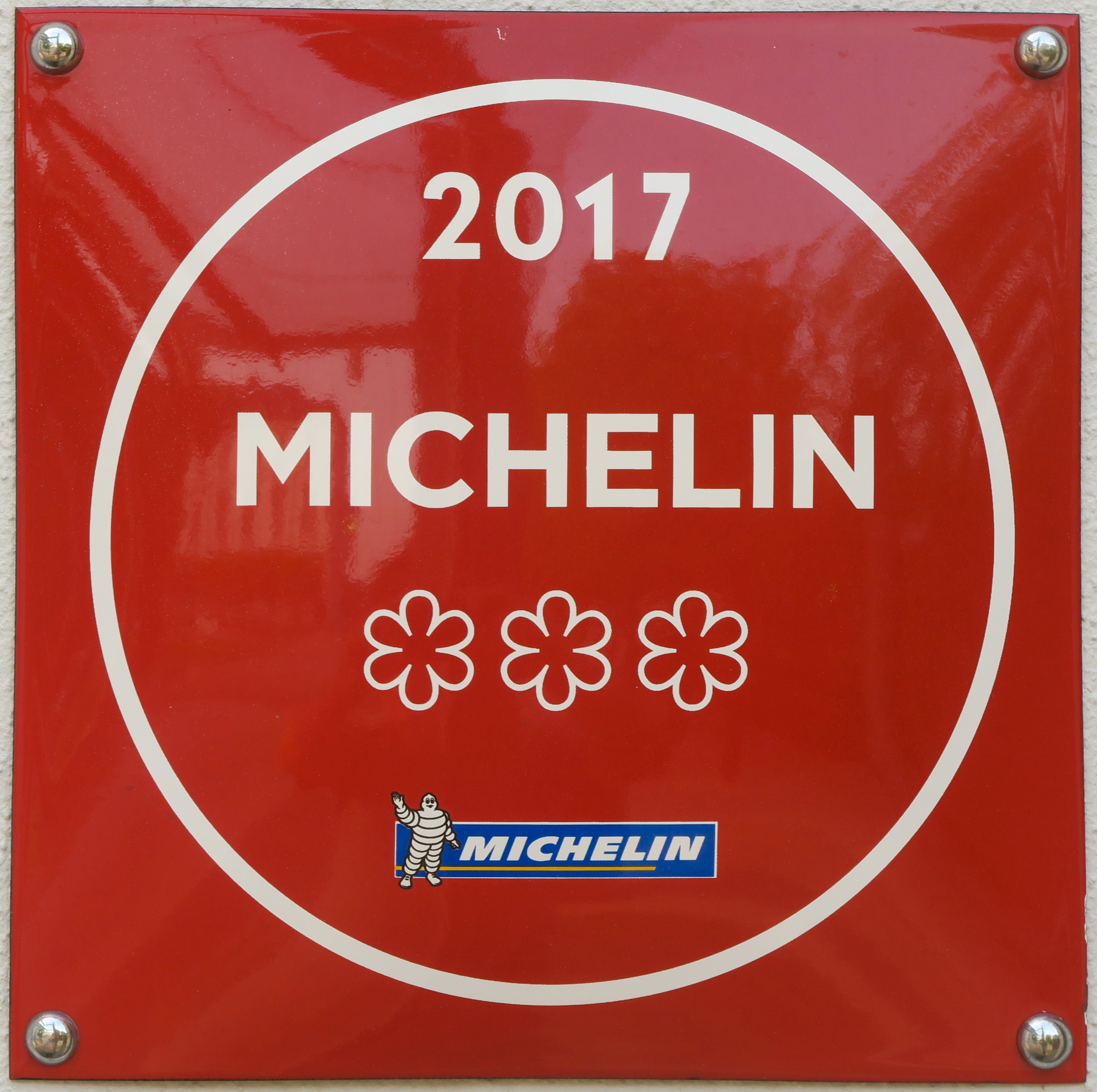
Michelin three stars, at the entrance of a restaurant

Restaurant ratings identify restaurants according to their quality, using notations such as stars or other symbols, or numbers. Stars are a familiar and popular symbol, with scales of one to three or five stars commonly used. Ratings appear in guide books as well as in the media, typically in newspapers, lifestyle magazines and webzines. Websites featuring consumer-written reviews and ratings are increasingly popular, but are far less reliable.

In addition, there are ratings given by public health agencies rating the level of sanitation practiced by an establishment.

== Restaurant guides ==
One of the best known guides is the Michelin series which award one to three stars to restaurants they perceive to be of high culinary merit. One star indicates a "very good restaurant"; two stars indicate a place "worth a detour"; three stars means "exceptional cuisine, worth a special journey".

Several bigger newspapers employ restaurant critics and publish online dining guides for the cities they serve, such as the Irish Independent for Irish restaurants.

=== List of notable restaurant guides ===
==== Europe (original working area) ====
Name	Working area	Type of rating	Method
Michelin Guide	Worldwide	1 to 3 stars	Professional inspectors
Gault Millau	Europe	1 to 20 points	Inspectors of local agents
Automobile Association	United Kingdom	1 to 5 rosettes	Professional inspectors
Gambero Rosso	Italy and San Marino	1 to 3 forks	—N/a
Harden's	United Kingdom	Rating out of 5	Annual survey
La Liste	Worldwide	Ranking	Proprietary algorithm
The Good Food Guide	United Kingdom	Rating out of 10	Inspections by correspondents
The World's 50 Best Restaurants	Worldwide	Ranking	—N/a

==== The Americas ====
Name	Working area	Type of rating	Method
Michelin Guide	New York, Chicago, D.C., and San Francisco	1 to 3 stars	Professional inspectors
Gayot Guide/Gault Millau	United States	1 to 20 points	Inspectors of local agents
American Automobile Association	United States	1 to 5 diamonds	AAA employees hired specifically to rate hotels
Forbes Travel Guide	United States & Canada	1 to 5 stars	Professionals, consumers, and self-reporting by restaurants
Zagat	United States	30 point scale	Public reviews

==== Asia ====
Name	Working area	Type of rating	Method
Blue Ribbon Survey	South Korea	1 to 3 ribbons	Reader evaluation
Miele Guide	Asia	—N/a	—N/a
Kingfisher Explocity Food Guide	India	—N/a	Inspectors

==== Oceania ====
Name	Working area	Type of rating	Method
Australian Good Food Guide (AGFG)	Australia	Chef Hat Awards	
The Good Food Guide	Australia	Rating out of 10	Inspections by correspondents
Gourmet Traveller	Australia	Chef Hat	
Lifestyle FOOD Awards	Australia	Chef Hat	

Internet restaurant review sites have empowered regular people to generate non-expert reviews. This has sparked criticism from restaurant establishments about the non-editorial, non-professional critiques. Those reviews can be falsified or faked.

=== Rating criteria ===
The different guides have their own criteria. Not every guide looks behind the scenes or decorum. Others look particularly sharply to value for money. This is why a restaurant can be missing in one guide, while mentioned in another. Because the guides work independently, it is possible to have simultaneous multiple recognitions.

=== Ratings impact ===
A top restaurant rating can mean success or failure for a restaurant, particularly when bestowed by an influential sources such as Michelin. Still, a good rating is not enough for economic success and many Michelin starred and/or highly rated restaurants have met the same fate as the Dutch restaurant De Swaen.

In 2004, Michelin came under fire after bipolar chef Bernard Loiseau committed suicide after he was rumoured to be in danger of losing one of his three Michelin stars. However, the Michelin guide had stated he would not be downgraded. Most news reports attributed his suicide to the downgrade carried out by the rival Gault Millau guide.

== Sanitation ==
Many countries have a system of checks and inspections in place for sanitation. Only a few countries, amongst others the United States and Canada, create and publish restaurant ratings based on this.

=== United States ===
In the United States, several states have imposed uniform statewide restaurant grading systems, under which safety and hygiene inspection reports are used to compute numerical scores or letter grades, and those must be prominently posted by restaurants. The first state to enact such a statewide system was South Carolina in 1995. Tennessee and North Carolina later enacted legislation imposing similar statewide systems.

In many other states, the mandatory posting of restaurant grades is neither required nor prohibited statewide, which means it is purely a matter for local governments like cities and counties.

==== Los Angeles ====
In November 1997, a KCBS-TV sweeps news story called Behind The Kitchen Door focused attention on problems in Los Angeles's top restaurants. The station used hidden cameras to catch restaurant employees practicing unsafe food handling practices such as picking up food from the floor and re-serving it, vermin crawling near food to be served, and mixing uncooked meat and vegetables. The KCBS report also reviewed inspection reports, which have always been public records, but were available only on request (and at the time required an in-person visit to the health department), and found that many problems had already been expressly identified in the inspection reports but had not been adequately publicized.

As a result of this report, in December 1997 the Board of Supervisors of Los Angeles County introduced a letter grading system already in use for some years in two other nearby counties, San Diego County and Riverside County. Instead of merely listing violations in a report, the restaurant inspection system was changed to a point system, with each restaurant starting each inspection with a perfect score of 100 points. Environmental health specialists were required to use a standard form called the Food Official Inspection Report to identify violations as they inspected establishments; the form required them to subtract a certain number of points for each violation found. Based on the number of points remaining, letter grades were then assigned and required to be prominently posted at all establishments selling food, and all establishments were also required to provide a copy of the underlying inspection report to any customer on request. Grades are available at the County Public Health Department's web site.

Two Stanford University economics researchers found that higher lettered restaurants scored a rise in revenue, while lower lettered restaurants have seen their revenues decline. The quality of restaurants in the entire county became more acceptable, with the average score going up from about 75% to nearly 90% in the year after restaurant grading was implemented. The researchers concluded that the results were not explained solely by consumers switching to higher quality restaurants, and that some of the effect had to do with restaurants making changes due to grade cards. Another study estimated a 13.1% reduction in hospitalization for food borne illnesses in the year following implementation of the program, suggesting that implementing a restaurant grading program could improve public safety.

Although Los Angeles County was not the first local jurisdiction to require restaurants to post grades, its success in implementing such a program inspired many other local governments during the 2000s to enact similar programs based on the Los Angeles model, such as Toronto, Las Vegas, Dallas, and New York City.

== See also ==
- Culinary Arts
- Food critic
- Food grading
- Food safety
