= Dobong District =

District of Seoul, South Korea

Dobong
- Autonomous District
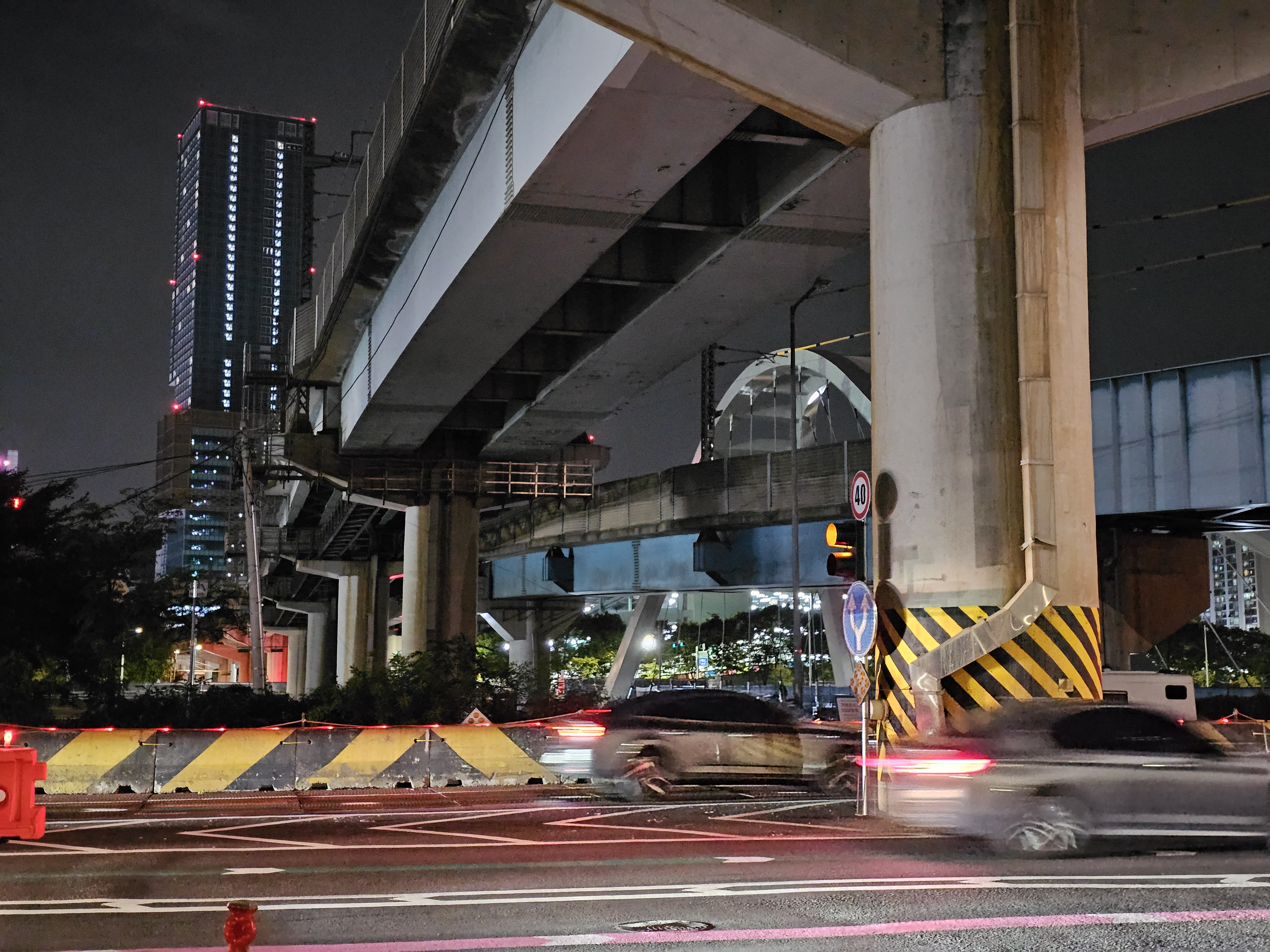
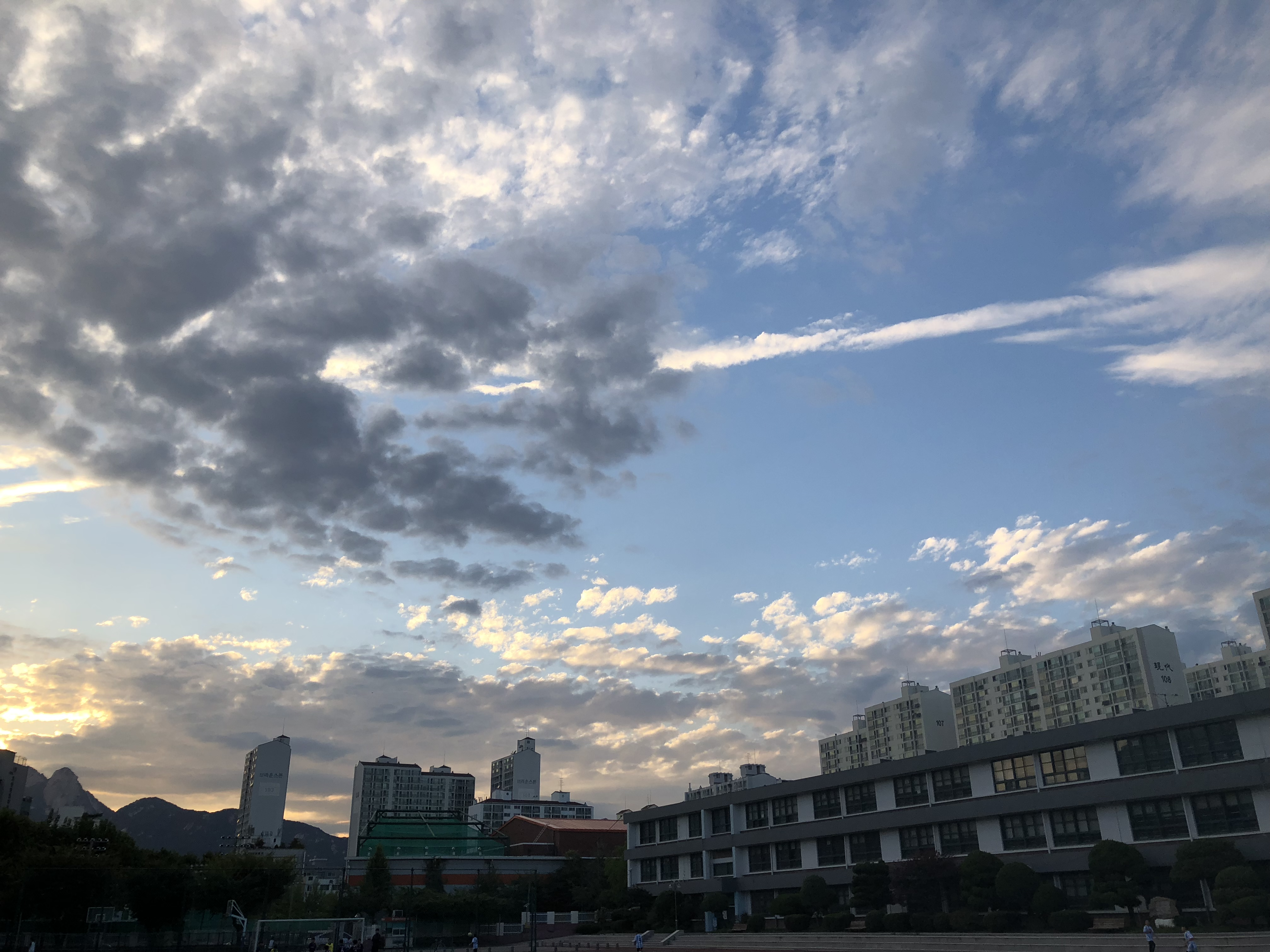
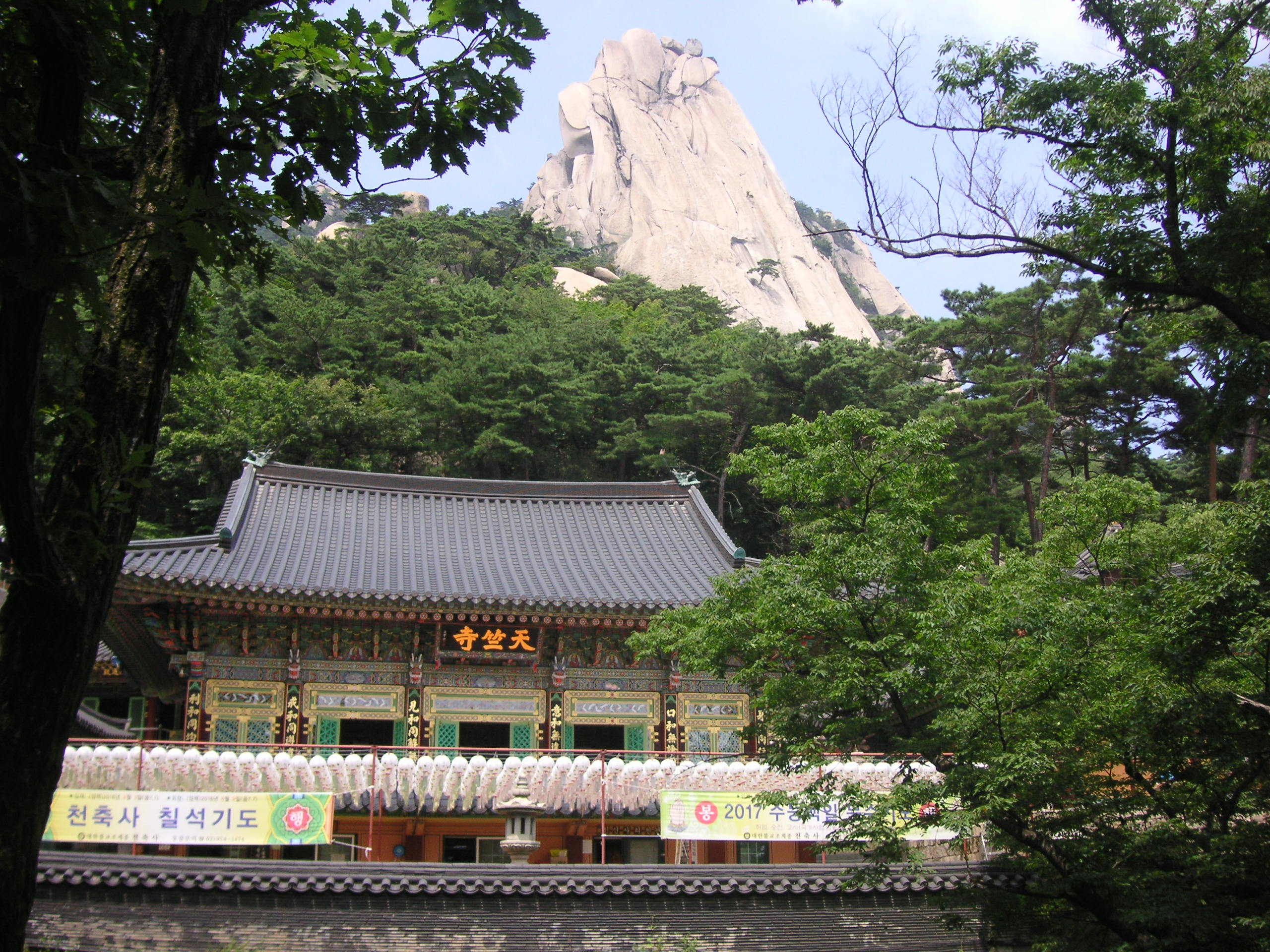
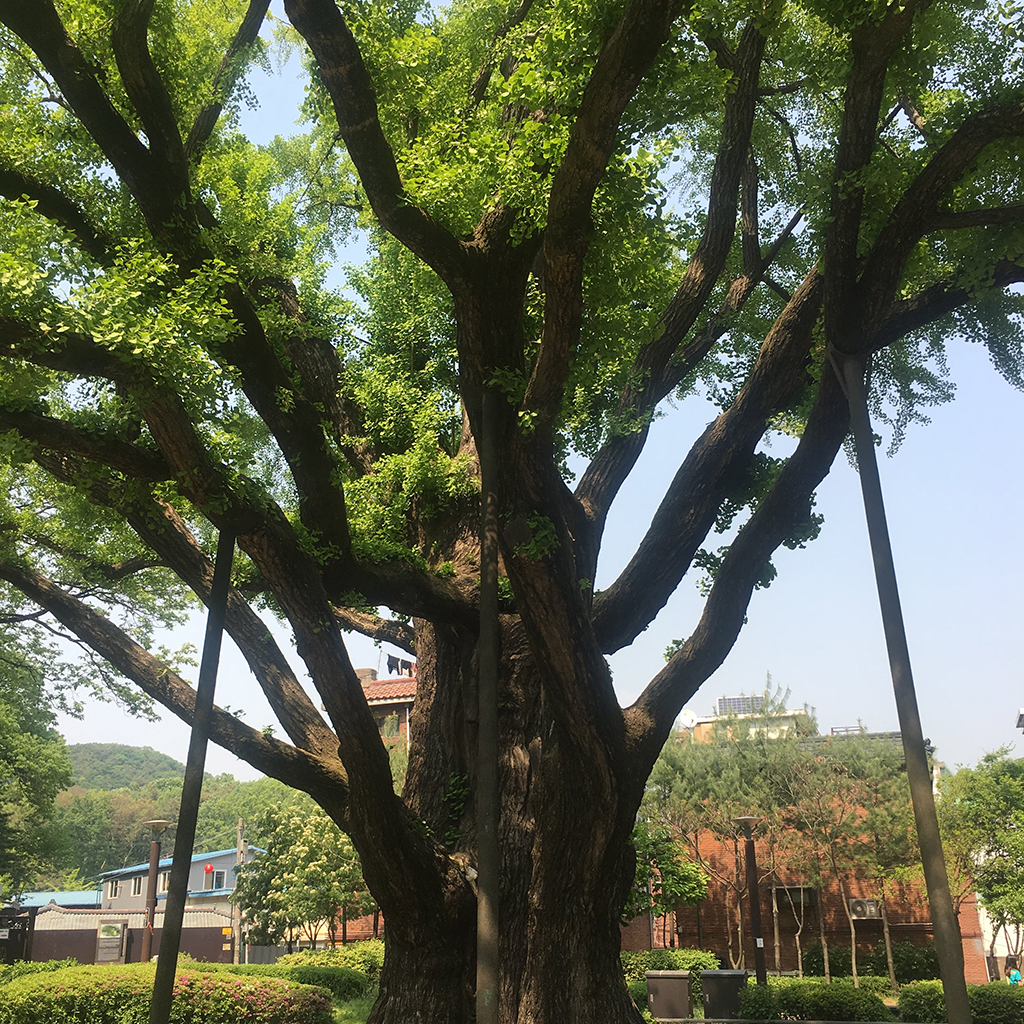
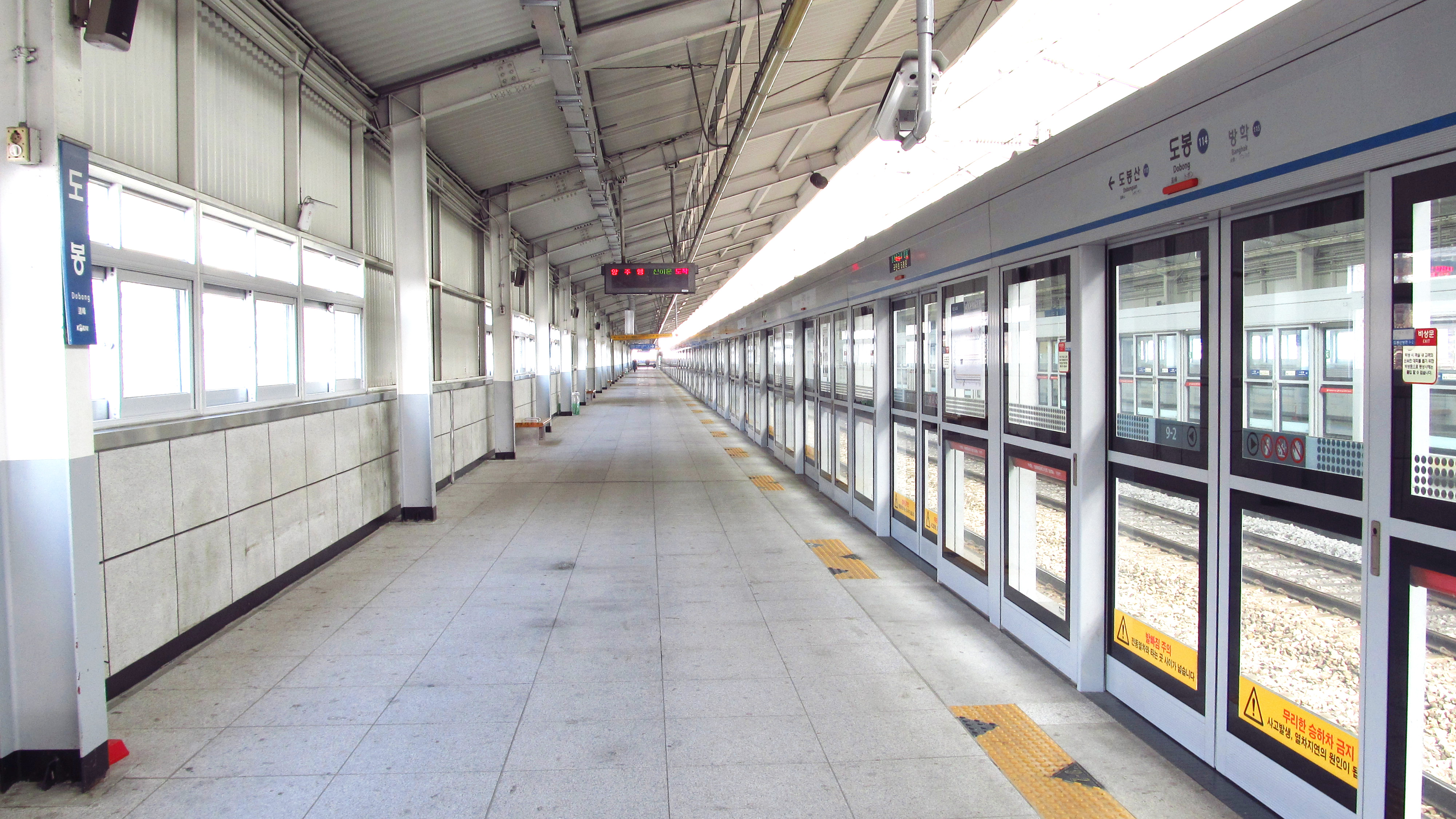
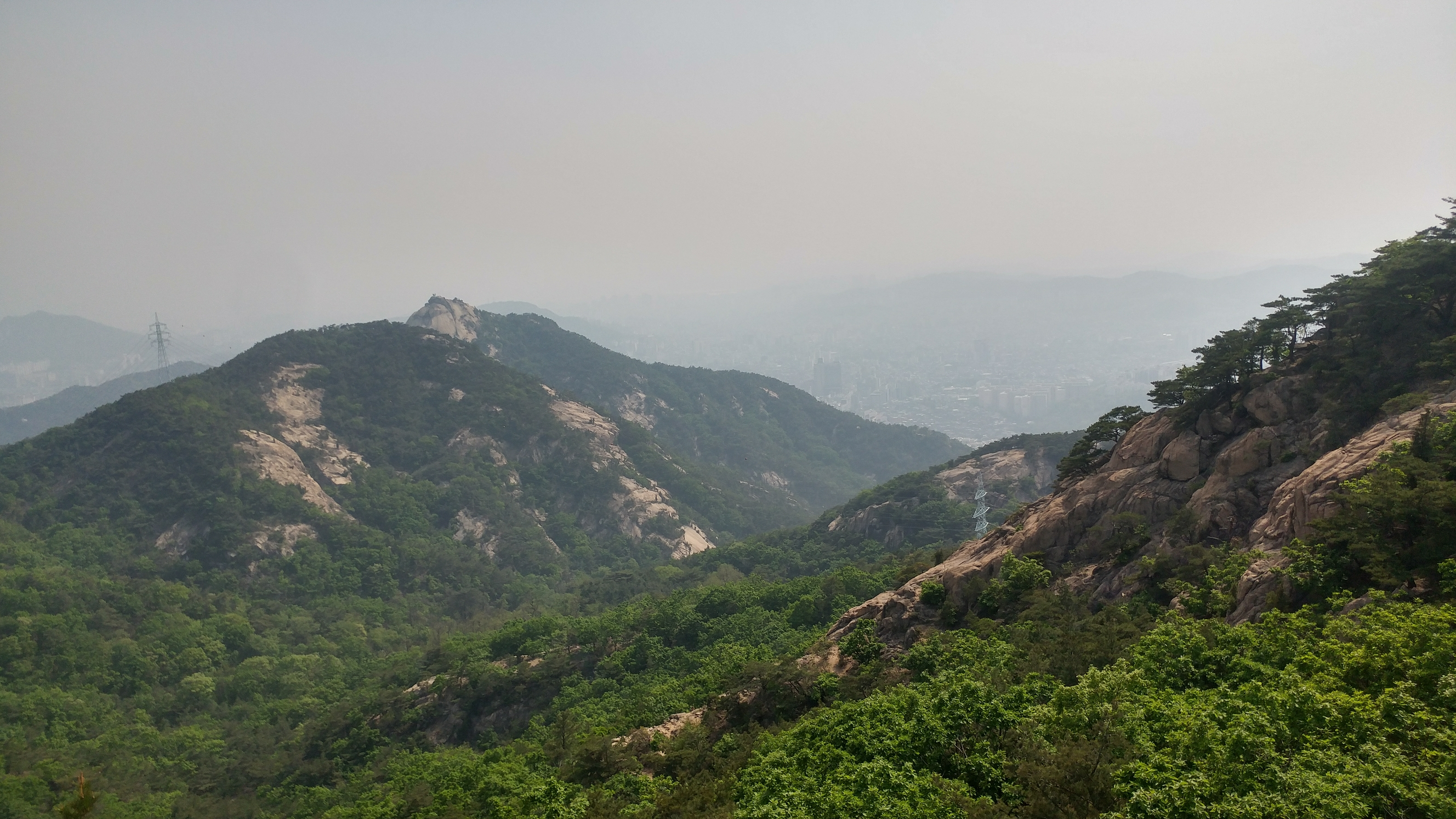
- Seed Cube Changdong, seen from the Dongbu Expressway City skyscape Cheonchuksa Temple Banghak-dong Ginko Tree Dobong Station Bukhansan

- Flag

- Location of Dobong District in Seoul
- Interactive map of Dobong
- Coordinates: 37°41′42″N 127°02′49″E
- Country: South Korea
- Region: Sudogwon
- Special City: Seoul
- Administrative dong: 14

Government
  - Body: Dobong District Council
  - Mayor: Kim Dong-wook (김동욱) (Democratic)
  - MNAs: List of MNAs: In Jae-keun (Democratic); Oh Gi-hyoung (Democratic)

Area
  - Total: 20.8 km^{2} (8.0 sq mi)

Population (June 2025)
  - Total: 301,554
  - Density: 14,500/km^{2} (37,500/sq mi)
- Time zone: UTC+9 (Korea Standard Time)
- Postal code: 01300~01599
- Area code: 02-9xx,2000~
- Website: Dobong District official website

Korean name
- Hangul: 도봉구
- Hanja: 道峰區
- RR: Dobong-gu
- MR: Tobong-gu

Dobong District (Korean: 도봉구; IPA: [toboŋɡu]) is one of the 25 districts of Seoul, South Korea. As of 2020, Dobong has a population of 315,979 and an area of 20.71 square kilometres (8.00 sq mi), and is divided into four administrative neighborhoods. The district is located in northeastern Seoul, bordering the Gyeonggi Province cities of Yangju and Uijeongbu to the north and the districts of Gangbuk to the southwest and Nowon to the east.

== History ==
Dobong District was created in 1973 by splitting 22 administrative neighborhoods off from Seongbuk District. By 1979, some of these 22 original administrative neighborhoods had been subdivided, increasing the number of administrative neighborhoods in Dobong District to 35. In 1988, the sixteen administrative neighborhoods in Dobong-dong, Chang-dong, Wolgye-dong, Gongneung-dong, Hagye-dong, Junggye-dong, and Sanggye-dong were split off to form Nowon District. The following year, Dobong-dong and Chang-dong were returned to Dobong District. Then in 1995, the 18 administrative neighborhoods in Mia-dong, Suyu-dong, and Beon-dong were split off to form Gangbuk District, leaving Dobong District with its present 14 administrative neighborhoods.

== Symbols ==
- Flower: Climbing rose
- Tree: Pine tree
- Bird: Pigeon

== Mountain ==
Dobongsan (Dobong Mountain) is a mountain in Bukhansan National Park, partly under the jurisdiction of Dobong District. It is a popular leisure spot for district residents.

In addition, Dobongsan has many large and small temples such as Cheonchuksa, Wontongsa, and Manweolam.

== Administrative divisions ==
Administrative divisions

Dobong District is composed of four legal-status neighborhoods (법정동) which comprise a total of 14 administrative neighborhoods:

- Dobong-dong (도봉동 道峰洞) 1, 2
- Banghak-dong (방학동 放鶴洞) 1, 2, 3
- Ssangmun-dong (쌍문동 雙門洞) 1, 2, 3, 4
- Chang-dong (창동 倉洞) 1, 2, 3, 4, 5

== Transportation ==
=== Railroad ===
- Korail
  - Seoul Subway Line 1
    (Uijeongbu) ← Dobongsan — Dobong — Banghak — Changdong — Nokcheon → (Nowon-gu)
- Seoul Metro
  - Seoul Subway Line 4
    (Nowon-gu) ← Chang-dong — Ssangmun → (Gangbuk-gu)
- Seoul Metropolitan Rapid Transit Corporation
  - Seoul Subway Line 7
    (Uijeongbu) ← Dobongsan → (Nowon-gu)

== Economy ==
Along with Gangbuk District, Dobong District is considered a middle-to-lower tier neighborhood in terms of economic standing within Seoul. However, property values have been steadily increasing and due to developments like the construction of the Changdong Station GTX line, nearby apartment prices have been rising exponentially. As of February 16, 2022, the price of Bukhan Mountain I-Park was approximately 1.4 billion KRW. While still relatively lower compared to affluent areas in Seoul, such as Gangnam and Apgujeong, infrastructure improvements like the planned Seoul National University Hospital and Changdong Arena suggest that property values may soon approach similar levels.

Additionally, Dobong District is home to the largest concentration of sock manufacturing facilities in the country. While most of these are not large factories, they mainly consist of small-scale workshops located in building basements or homes. Most factories are concentrated in Changdong with a significant number also located in Banghak-dong and Ssangmun-dong.

== Education ==
- Jawoon High School
- Duksung Women's University

== Sister cities ==
- Changping, China
- Donghae, South Korea
- Iloilo City, Philippines

== Notable people ==
- Lee Tae-min (born 1993), singer-songwriter, dancer, actor, and member of SHINee and SuperM
- Lee Seung-gi (born 1987), singer, actor, host, and entertainer
- Son Hyun-woo (born 1992), singer, dancer, actor, and member of Monsta X
- Yoon San-ha (born 2000), singer and member of Astro
