= Blue Ribbon Survey =

South Korea restaurant guide

- Industry: Restaurant reviews
- Founded: November 2005
- Headquarters: South Korea
- Website: bluer.co.kr

The Blue Ribbon Survey (Korean: 블루리본 서베이) is South Korea's first restaurant guide established in November 2005. It is published every year reflecting the evaluation data of the general public collected through its website.

== History ==
According to an interview with Weekly Hankook, editor-in-chief Kim Eun-jo had been planning the Blue Ribbon Survey since 1999. At that time, however, evaluation was meaningless because there were not a lot of restaurants in South Korea and the quality of food and service was low. After the 2002 FIFA World Cup, the number of restaurants nationwide and their quality increased, so the survey could begin in 2005. Kim also claimed that the survey combined the strengths of the Michelin Guide and Zagat Survey.

Since 2024, the Blue Ribbon Survey has collaborated with Coca-Cola and announced "Red Ribbon" restaurants.

== Rating system ==
- Three blue ribbons are awarded to restaurants that have the best skills in their field.
- Two ribbons are given to restaurants that you want to recommend to people around you.
- One ribbon is given to restaurants that you want to take time to revisit.

Evaluators were divided into "general public knights" (일반인 기사단) consisting of bloggers interested in food or gourmets and "expert knights" (전문가 기사단) consisting of related industry officials, professors, and reporters. General public evaluators could give two blue ribbons at most while expert evaluators could award three ribbons. From 2019, three ribbon restaurants are decided only by reader evaluation without expert evaluation. This is because reader evaluation accumulated since 2005 increasingly became similar to expert evaluation. Evaluation criteria are taste, atmosphere, service, price satisfaction, creativity and tradition.

== Blue Ribbon Award ==
The Blue Ribbon Award is South Korea's first chef award. It was first held in 2015 and is hosted by Blue Ribbon Survey. The winners are decided by reader vote.

In 2015, Lim Jeong-sik (Korean cuisine) and Lim Gi-hak (foreign cuisine) were selected as Chef of the Year. Lee Hyeon-hui won Pastry Chef of the Year and Kang Min-gu won Young Chef of the Year.

In 2016, Kang Min-gu (Korean cuisine), Wang Byeong-ho (Eastern cuisine), and Kim Dae-cheon (Western cuisine) were selected as Chef of the Year. Ko Eun-soo won Pastry Chef of the Year and Lee Ji-won won Young Chef of the Year. Park Hyo-nam and Lee Min won the Lifetime Achievement Award.
