= Chang-dong =

Coordinates: 37.648°N 127.044°E

- dong (neighborhood)
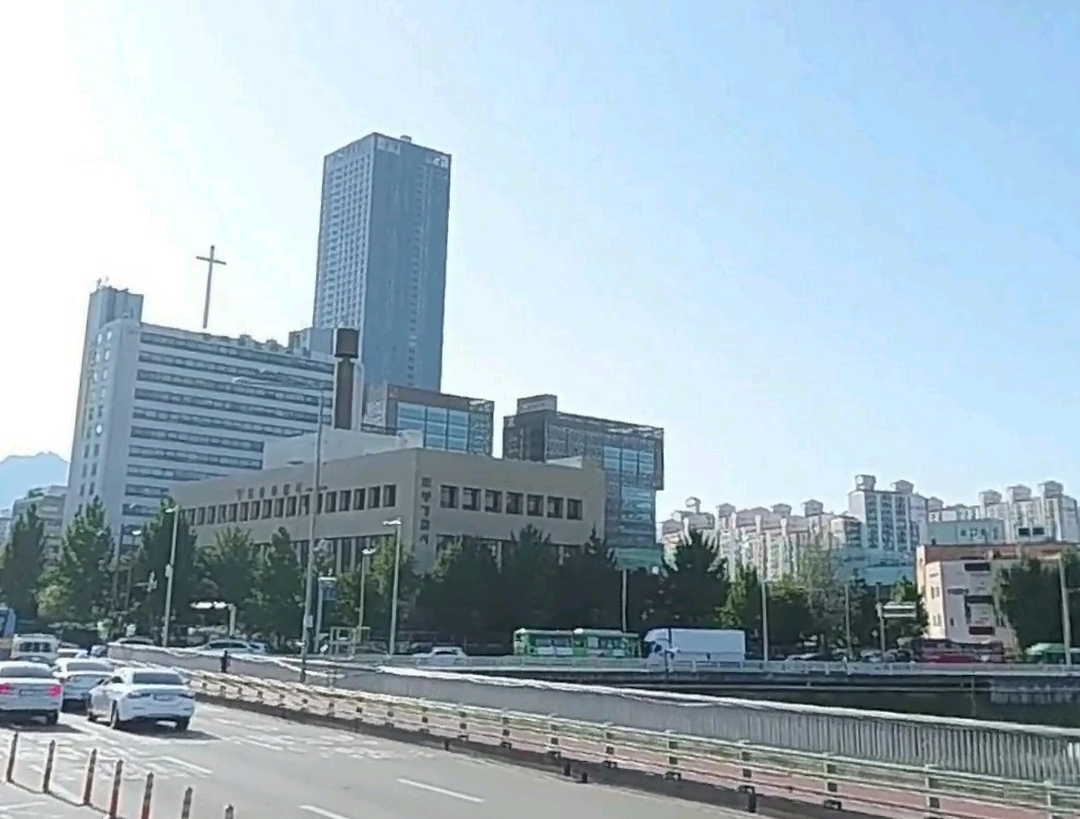
- Chang-dong skyline

- Country: South Korea

Area
  - Total: 4.35 km^{2} (1.68 sq mi)

Population (2010)
  - Total: 116,121
  - Density: 26,700/km^{2} (69,100/sq mi)

Korean name
- Hangul: 창동
- Hanja: 倉洞
- RR: Chang-dong
- MR: Ch'ang-dong

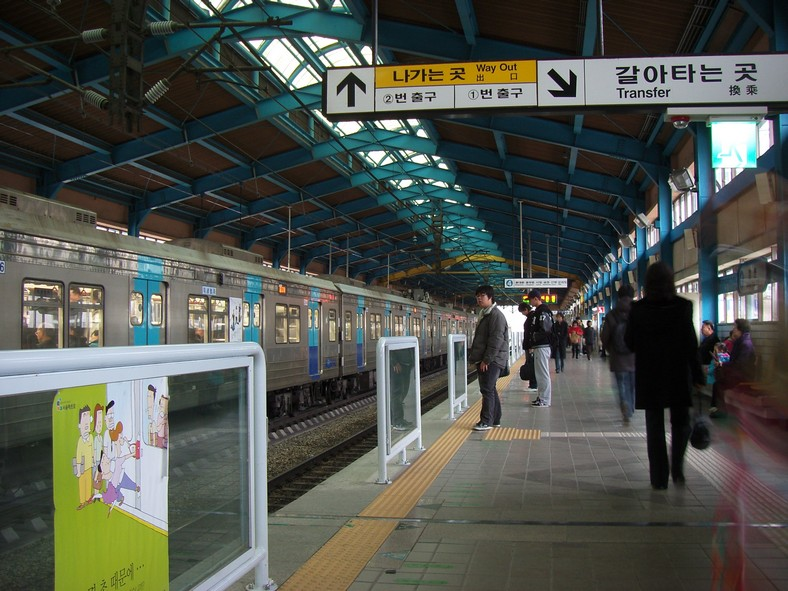
Seoul subway line4 Chang-dong station platform

Chang-dong (Korean: 창동) is a dong (neighborhood) of Dobong District, Seoul, South Korea

== Notable people ==
- Son Hyun-woo (손현우, born 1992), singer, dancer, actor, and member of Monsta X

== See also ==
- Administrative divisions of South Korea
