= Seoul Future Heritage =

Designation for historic things

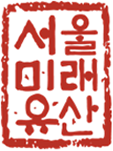
Seoul Future Heritage logo

Seoul Future Heritage (Korean: 서울 미래유산) is a designation by the Seoul Metropolitan Government for entities in Seoul that are deemed worthy of preservation. Various things can be so designated, including buildings, restaurants, books, and foods. The designation has existed since 2012, and is maintained by the Seoul Metropolitan Government. Entities with the designation receive various benefits from the city government, including tourism support and funding for repairs.

== Description ==
Seoul is the capital of South Korea. It has experienced significant redevelopment in its recent history, with older entities being replaced by newer at a significant pace. While the city has significant amenities, some have argued that the city's identity has become less distinct amidst these losses. The Seoul Future Heritage program aims to preserve even more humble historic buildings and entities.

Any citizen can propose additions to the list. The proposals are screened by the Future Heritage Preservation Committee, and the owner of the entity also provides consent to be included on the list.

The program's success has been debated; some argue that while the program is well-intentioned, the benefits given to businesses, especially amidst rising rent costs or redevelopment, are insufficient. Protections given to these entities have varied over time. One reporter in 2022 argued that Seoul mayor Oh Se-hoon reduced protections for older entities in order to address housing cost concerns around the time of his election.

== See also ==
- Oraegage – a designation for historic businesses in Seoul
- Heritage preservation in South Korea
