= Cryptocurrency bubble =

Speculative bubble involving cryptocurrency prices

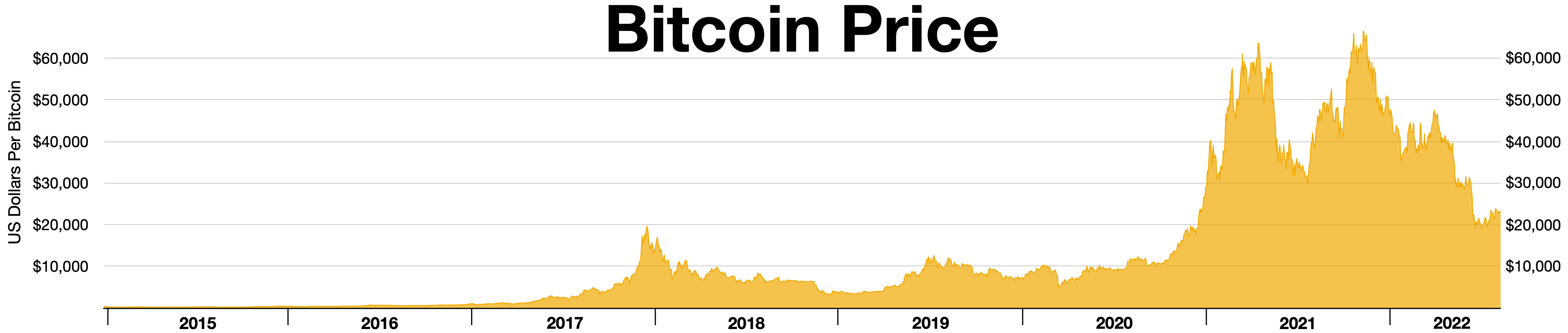
Bitcoin price daily, 2015–2022

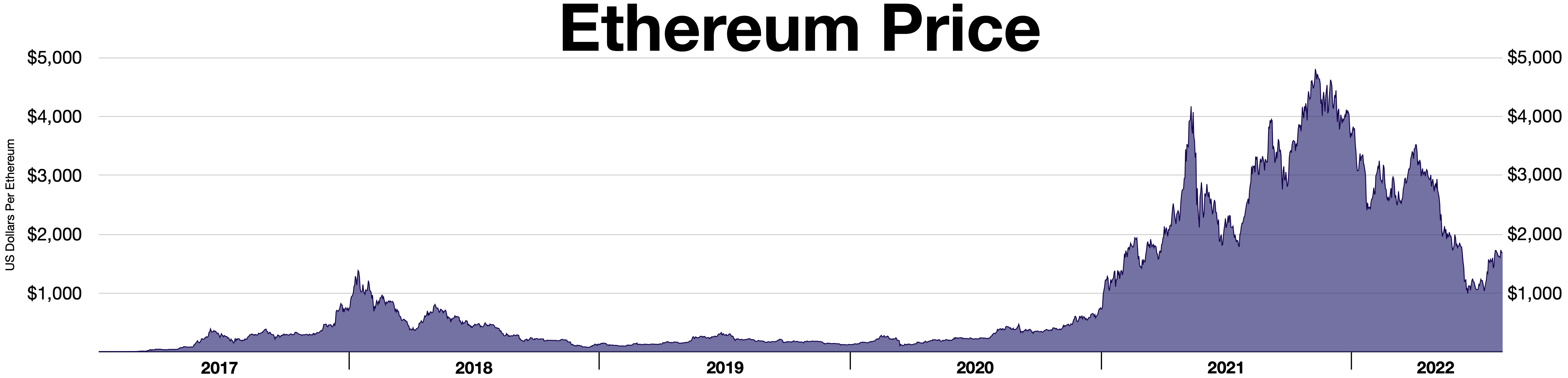
Ethereum price daily, 2017–2022

A cryptocurrency bubble is a phenomenon where the market increasingly considers the going price of cryptocurrency assets to be inflated against their hypothetical value. The history of cryptocurrency has been marked by several speculative bubbles on a boom to bust cycle.

Some economists and prominent investors have expressed the view that the entire cryptocurrency market constitutes a speculative bubble. Adherents of this view include Berkshire Hathaway board member Warren Buffett and several laureates of the Nobel Memorial Prize in Economic Sciences, central bankers, and investors.

== History ==
=== 2011 booms and crashes ===
In February 2011, the price of Bitcoin rose to US$1.06, then fell to US$0.67 that April. This spike was encouraged by several Slashdot posts about it. In June 2011, Bitcoin's price again rose, to US$29.58. This came after attention from a Gawker article about the dark web market Silk Road. The price then fell to US$2.14 that November.

=== 2013 boom and 2014–15 crash ===
In November 2013, Bitcoin's price rose to US$1,127.45. It then gradually declined, bottoming out at US$172.15 in January 2015.

=== 2017 boom and 2018 crash ===
The 2018 cryptocurrency crash (also known as the Bitcoin crash and the Great crypto crash) was the sell-off of most cryptocurrencies starting in January 2018. Long Blockchain Corp. is considered a vivid example and textbook example of market euphoria during the 2017 bubble. After an unprecedented boom in 2017, the price of Bitcoin fell by about 65% from 6 January to 6 February 2018. Subsequently, nearly all other cryptocurrencies followed Bitcoin's crash. By September 2018, cryptocurrencies collapsed 80% from their peak in January 2018, making the 2018 cryptocurrency crash worse than the dot-com bubble's 78% collapse. By 26 November, Bitcoin also fell by 80% from its peak, having lost almost one-third of its value in the previous week.

A January 2018 article by CBS cautioned about possible fraud, citing the case of BitConnect, a British company which received a cease-and-desist order from the Texas State Securities Board. BitConnect had promised very high monthly returns but had not registered with state securities regulators or given their office address.

In November 2018, the total current value for Bitcoin fell below $100 billion for the first time since October 2017, and the price of Bitcoin fell below $4,000, representing an 80 percent decline from its peak the previous January. Bitcoin reached a low of around $3,100 in December 2018.

==== Timeline of the crash ====
- 17 December 2017: Bitcoin's price briefly reaches a new all-time high of $19,783.06.
- 22 December 2017: Bitcoin falls below $11,000, a fall of 45% from its peak.
- 12 January 2018: Amidst rumors that South Korea could be preparing to ban trading in cryptocurrency, the price of Bitcoin depreciates by 12 percent.
- 26 January 2018: Coincheck, Japan's largest cryptocurrency OTC market, is hacked. US$530 million of the NEM are stolen by the hacker, causing Coincheck to indefinitely suspend trading. The loss is the largest ever so far by an incident of theft.
- Late March 2018: Facebook, Google, and Twitter ban advertisements for initial coin offerings (ICO) and token sales.
- 15 November 2018: Bitcoin's total current value falls below $100 billion for the first time since October 2017 and the price of Bitcoin falls to $5,500.

==== Initial coin offerings ====
Wired noted in 2017 that the bubble in initial coin offerings (ICOs) was about to burst. Some investors bought ICOs in hopes of participating in the financial gains similar to those enjoyed by early Bitcoin or Ethereum speculators.

In June 2018, Ella Zhang of Binance Labs, a division of the cryptocurrency exchange Binance, stated that she was hoping to see the bubble in ICOs collapse. She promised to help "fight scams and shit coins".

=== 2020–21 boom and 2022 crash ===
==== 2020–2021 booms ====
From 8 to 12 March 2020, the price of Bitcoin fell by 30 percent from $8,901 to $6,206. By October 2020, Bitcoin was trading for approximately $13,200. In November 2020, Bitcoin again surpassed its previous all-time high of over $19,000.

In early 2021, Bitcoin's price fluctuated wildly, rising to $34,792.47 on 3 January 2021 before crashing by 17 percent the next day and reaching above $40,000 for the first time on 7 January. On 11 January, the UK Financial Conduct Authority warned investors against lending or investments in cryptoassets, that they should be prepared "to lose all their money". On 16 February, Bitcoin reached $50,000 for the first time. On 13 March, Bitcoin surpassed $61,000 for the first time. Following a smaller correction in February, Bitcoin plunged from its peak above $64,000 on 14 April to below $49,000 on 23 April, representing a 23% mini-crash in less than 10 days, dipping below the March bottom trading range and wiping half a trillion dollars from the combined crypto total current value.

On 14 April, Coinbase, a much hyped crypto exchange, went public on the NASDAQ. Their shares grew by over 31% on their first day to $328.28, pushing their market cap to $85.8B.

Other cryptocurrencies' prices also sharply rose, then followed by losses of value during this period. In May 2021, the value of Dogecoin, originally created as a joke, increased to 20,000% of value in one year. It then dropped by 93% shortly after.

By 19 May, Bitcoin had dropped in value by 30% to $31,000, Ethereum by 40%, and Dogecoin by 45%. Nearly all cryptocurrencies were down by double-digit percentages. Major cryptocurrency exchange Binance went down amid a market-wide price crash and traders are now seeking justice for their losses. This was partly in response to Elon Musk's announcement that Tesla would suspend payments using the Bitcoin network due to environmental concerns, along with an announcement from the People's Bank of China reiterating that digital currencies cannot be used for payments.

Bitcoin and other cryptocurrencies experienced a solid recovery after Elon Musk met with leading Bitcoin mining companies to develop more sustainable and efficient Bitcoin mining. After bottoming out on 19 July, by early September Bitcoin had reached $52,633.54 while Ethereum grew by over 100% to $3,952.13. After a short but significant fall, both cryptos peaked on 7 November 2021 at $67,566.83 and $4,812.09, respectively. The NASDAQ would peak 12 days later on 19 November at 16,057.44.

In September, Bitcoin officially became legal tender in El Salvador with many news sources wondering what countries would be next.

As of October 2021, China has continued shutting down crypto trading and mining activities.

As of October 2024, Tesla has not yet resumed payment with Bitcoin, although they do accept payment with Dogecoin on select items.

==== 2022 crash ====
After its peak, the crypto market began to fall with the rest of the market. By the end of 2021, Bitcoin had fallen nearly 30% from its peak down to $47,686.81, and Ethereum had fallen about 23% to $3,769.70. In December 2022, The Washington Post reported that there was "the sense that the crypto bubble has definitively popped, taking with it billions of dollars of investments made by regular people, pension funds, venture capitalists, and traditional companies".

2022–24 timeline
Date	Event
13 February 2022	Four crypto agencies purchase Super Bowl ads: Coinbase, FTX, eToro, and Crypto.com. Coinbase becomes one of the most downloaded apps after their ad airs.
Early April	The U.S. Securities and Exchange Commission (SEC) announce that they would begin to put regulations on the crypto agencies, setting the stage for a broad selloff.
4 April	Bitmex becomes the first crypto agency to announce layoffs, laying off 25% of its workers.
3 May	The Federal Reserve raises interest rates by 0.5%, triggering a broad market selloff. Over eight days, Bitcoin falls 27% to just over $29,000, while Ethereum falls 33.5% to around $1,960. The NASDAQ falls 12.5% during the following five days after the announcement.
10 May	Coinbase, with shares down nearly 80% from their peak, announces that if they went bankrupt people would lose their funds. The CEO later announces that they were at no risk of bankruptcy.
5-13 May	TerraUSD and Luna, two stablecoins run by Terra, lose their pegs to the US Dollar and collapse, with the former being worth $0.10 and the latter nearly nothing.
12 June	Celsius Network, a crypto exchange, announces the halt of all withdrawals and transfers. Bitcoin falls 15% the following day to nearly $22,500, while Ethereum falls to $1,200. A wave of layoffs from other crypto agencies accompanies this, including from Crypto.com and Coinbase.
13 June	Tron's algorithmic stablecoin, USDD, loses its peg to the US dollar.
17 June	Bitcoin dips below $20,000 for the first time since December 2020, and Ethereum falls below $1,000 for the first time since January 2021.; Babel Finance, a crypto lender based in Hong Kong, freezes withdrawals.
23 June	CoinFlex pauses withdrawals after a counterparty, which it later named as Roger Ver, experienced liquidity issues and failed to repay a $47 million stablecoin margin call.
27 June	Three Arrows Capital, a cryptocurrency hedge fund, defaults on a $670 million loan from Voyager Digital, a cryptocurrency broker.
30 June	FTX announces they could acquire BlockFi, a crypto firm that had laid off 20% of their staff.
Late June	Many crypto agencies begin to rethink their spending as their funds begin to dwindle.
2 July	Three Arrows Capital declares bankruptcy, owing 27 creditors a total of US$3.5 billion.
4 July	Vauld, a Singapore-based crypto lender backed by Coinbase and Peter Thiel, halts withdrawals and trading on its platform.
5 July	eToro terminates their special-purpose acquisition company (SPAC) deal and lays off 6% of their workforce.; Crypto broker Voyager Digital files for Chapter 11 bankruptcy.
6 July	Genesis Trading discloses that it was exposed in the Three Arrows Capital bankruptcy.
8 July	Blockchain.com announces to its shareholders that it faces a potential $270 million loss from loans made to Three Arrows Capital.
11 July	Crypto miners in Texas temporarily shut down as an intense heat wave puts a strain on the energy grid.; The Financial Stability Board (FSB) states that crypto "must be subject to effective regulation and oversight commensurate to the risks they pose".
12 July	A filing with the United States Bankruptcy Court for the Southern District of New York from attorneys representing Three Arrows Capital creditors states that the company founders' current whereabouts were unknown. The court freezes the company's assets.
14 July	Celsius Network declares bankruptcy.
19 July	SkyBridge Capital freezes withdrawals.
20 July	Vauld files for protection against creditors, the equivalent of bankruptcy in Singapore.; Zipmex, a Southeast Asian exchange, freezes withdrawals.
25 July	Coinbase comes under SEC investigation for potentially lying to their customers. This leads to a 21% drop in their stock the next day.
8 August	Singapore-based cryptocurrency lender and borrower Hodlnaut suspends withdrawals.
7–8 November	FTT, FTX's main crypto coin, crashes and loses 80% of its value as the result of a run on the exchange.
10 November	BlockFi halts withdrawals due to the turmoil from FTX.; The largest stablecoin, Tether, loses its peg to the US dollar.
11 November	FTX declares bankruptcy.
16 November	Both Genesis Global Trading and Gemini halt withdrawals.
28 November	BlockFi declares bankruptcy, citing exposure to FTX as the main cause.
20 January 2023	Genesis files for Chapter 11 bankruptcy from exposure to FTX.
12 February 2023	Following the collapse of several big exchanges, no crypto agency purchased a Super Bowl ad.
2 March 2023	Shares in Silvergate Capital, an influential banker to the cryptocurrency industry, plunge 57.7% after the group said in a filing with the SEC that it would not be able to submit its annual 10-K report in time.
7 March 2023	The SEC freezes BKCoin transactions and accuses it of being a fraud after they raised $100M.
8–9 March 2023	Silvergate Capital announces plans to liquidate its bank.
10–12 March 2023	Shares in Signature Bank, one of the main banks to the cryptocurrency industry, drop as much as 32%, leading to its closure by the New York State Department of Financial Services in a bid to prevent the spreading banking crisis.
20 June 2023	New Zealand–based ethical travel company We Are Bamboo loses millions of dollars on cryptocurrency trading before announcing it was folding and would not be refunding hundreds of customers for their prepaid trips, according to a report from liquidators BDO.
15 August 2023	Auckland-based cryptocurrency exchange Dasset goes into voluntary liquidation, leaving customers unable to access their funds and with the firm unresponsive to complaints.
22 January 2024	Terraform, creator of TerraUSD and Luna, files for Chapter 11 bankruptcy, over one and a half years after the collapse of their coins.
14 February 2024	The liquidator of the Kim Dotcom-founded Bitcache indicated the company will be yet another cryptocurrency company failure that takes some untangling.

=== 2025 boom and 2026 crash ===
After the partial decrease in 2022, the value of Bitcoin rose again, reaching a new all-time high in October of 2025, when it was valued at US$125,835.92. It fell short of the US$200,000 expectation of Standard Chartered analysts, however, leading one analyst to warn of a possible "bitcoin winter".

By February 2026 the price of Bitcoin was lower than it had been in 2024. The New York Times called the slide "one of the worst crises in the crypto industry since 2022". Nobel economics laureate Paul Krugman said, "It does feel like we’re seeing a real crisis of faith right now."

=== Associated effects ===
==== Collapse of Terra-Luna ====
In May 2022, the stablecoin TerraUSD fell to US$0.10. This was supposed to be pegged to the US dollar via a complex algorithmic relationship with its support coin Luna. The loss of the peg resulted in Luna falling to almost zero, down from its high of $119.51. The collapse wiped out $45 billion of total current value in a week. On 25 May, a proposal was approved to reissue a new Luna cryptocurrency and to decouple from and abandon the devalued UST stablecoin. The new Luna coin lost value in the opening days of being listed on exchanges.

In the wake of Terra-Luna's collapse, another algorithmic stablecoin, DEI, lost its peg to the dollar and started to collapse.

Kwon Do-hyung, the founder of Terra-Luna, became wanted by both South Korea and the United States for his role as the creator of the cryptocurrency stablecoin which was guaranteed by an algorithm rather than with appropriate funds, after the loss of $40 billion by investors. He was arrested in Montenegro in December 2023 and sentenced to 15 years in prison in December 2025 after pleading guilty to wire fraud and conspiracy.

==== Private litigation in the United States ====
On 7 January 2022, a class-action lawsuit was filed against EthereumMax alleging it to be a pump and dump scheme with media personality Kim Kardashian, former professional boxer Floyd Mayweather Jr., former NBA player Paul Pierce, and other celebrities also being named in the lawsuit for promoting the Ether cryptocurrency on their social media accounts.

On 18 February, the United States Court of Appeals for the Eleventh Circuit ruled in a lawsuit against Bitconnect that the Securities Act of 1933 extends to targeted solicitation using social media.

On the same day, a class-action lawsuit was filed against SafeMoon alleging it to also be a pump and dump scheme with professional boxer Jake Paul, musician Nick Carter, rappers Soulja Boy and Lil Yachty, and social media personality Ben Phillips also being named in the lawsuit for promoting the SafeMoon cryptocurrency with misleading information on their social media accounts.

On 1 April, a class-action lawsuit was filed in Florida against the LGBcoin cryptocurrency company, NASCAR, professional stock car racing driver Brandon Brown, and political commentator Candace Owens alleging that the defendants made false or misleading statements about the LGBcoin and that the founders of the company had engaged in a pump and dump scheme.

On 13 April, Coinbase received a class-action securities fraud lawsuit from its shareholders for including false and misleading statements and omissions in the registration statement and prospectus of its initial public offering.

On 13 June, Binance received a class-action lawsuit from more than 2,000 investors accusing the company of false advertising in promoting TerraUSD.

On 17 June, TerraForm Labs received a class-action lawsuit in the United States alleging the company misled investors in violation of federal and California securities laws in marketing its cryptocurrencies in a manner that resembled securities.

On 7 July, Celsius Network received a lawsuit from a former cryptocurrency investment manager alleging the company failed to implement adequate risk management strategies or accounting practices to hedge the firm against cryptocurrency price fluctuations and protect its ability to repay its depositors, and that the company was operating an effective Ponzi scheme.

On 21 July, an ex-Coinbase employee and 2 other men were charged with wire fraud and conspiracy to commit wire fraud. This marked the first time charges were brought to people involving crypto assets.

==== Collapse of FTX ====
In early November 2022, Changpeng Zhao, the CEO of Binance, the largest crypto exchange in the world by volume, announced they would be liquidating their holdings in FTX Token (FTT) – about $584 million worth – from when FTX had bought back Binance's stake after Binance had been FTX's first investor. Zhao cited recent revelations, and the announcement followed reports that most of FTX liquidity was based in this coin and was very unstable. Specifically, it came shortly after an article from Ian Allison of CoinDesk on 2 November reporting that Alameda Research, a trading firm affiliated with FTX and also co-founded by FTX CEO Sam Bankman-Fried, held a significant amount of FTT: 40% of Alameda Research's $14.6 billion in assets was FTT token, whether unlocked (their biggest asset), locked or collateral (their third biggest asset).

This resulted in a run on FTX resulting in 90% of all FTT being withdrawn even after Alameda CEO Caroline Ellison publicly offered Zhao to buy Binance's FTT at $22 each. The price of FTT fell from $22 on 7 November to under $5.00 on 8 November, an 80% drop. Abracadabra.com's stablecoin "magic internet money" (MIM) also briefly lost its peg to the US dollar for the first time since May 2022. This all resulted in a liquidity crisis with the company unable to pay off the withdrawals.

On 8 November, Binance announced plans to buy FTX to save it from collapse. This sent shockwaves through the crypto market and led to a 10% drop in Bitcoin price and a 15% drop in Ether price. The following day, however, Binance immediately withdrew its offer, saying that "the issues are beyond our control or ability to help" and also citing reports regarding mishandled customer funds and alleged U.S. agency investigations" as concerns. Bitcoin and Ether consequently plummeted another 14% and 16%, respectively, to their lowest levels since November 2020. The same day, the SEC and Justice Department launched an investigation into the company.

FTX filed for Chapter 11 bankruptcy protection on 11 November. Almost one year later, Bankman-Fried was tried and convicted of conspiracy and wire fraud including after Alameda Research had used FTX customer funds in violation of the exchange's terms of service. He was sentenced to 25 years in prison in March 2024.

== Characterization as a bubble ==
Bitcoin has been characterized as a speculative bubble by eight winners of the Nobel Memorial Prize in Economic Sciences: Paul Krugman, Robert J. Shiller, Joseph Stiglitz, Richard Thaler, James Heckman, Thomas Sargent, Angus Deaton, and Oliver Hart; and by central bank officials including Alan Greenspan, Agustín Carstens, Vítor Constâncio, and Nout Wellink.

The investors Warren Buffett and George Soros have respectively characterized it as a "mirage" and a "bubble", while the business executives Jack Ma and J.P. Morgan Chase CEO Jamie Dimon have called it a "bubble" and a "fraud", respectively. However, Dimon said later he regrets calling Bitcoin a fraud.

Other notable skeptics are Bill Gates, Microsoft co-founder and philanthropist; Bruce Schneier, cryptographer, computer security expert, and public policy lecturer at Harvard University; and Molly White, author of the Web3 Is Going Just Great website.

Economic analysis of these market cycles suggests that cryptocurrency price dynamics are characteristic of speculative bubbles, driven more by market sentiment than by traditional economic fundamentals. The increasing integration of crypto with the financial system means these shocks do not occur in isolation. Studies find significant spillover effects, where volatility in cryptocurrency markets transmits to traditional asset classes like equities and commodities. More recent structural models confirm this transmission occurs by affecting overall investor risk appetite and that it extends to the broader macroeconomy, with a notable impact on long-term inflation. This demonstrates a concrete channel through which cryptocurrency bubbles and crashes can have broader economic consequences.

It has been suggested by Lee Reiners, a former Federal Reserve economist, that "when this crypto bubble bursts — and it will burst — it will end up impacting people across the economy even if they don’t have direct investment in crypto”.

== See also ==
- Blockchain § History, a broader overview of the history of blockchain technology
  - Cryptocurrency § History
- Cryptocurrency and crime
- Crypto Ponzi scheme
