= Iron Finance =

Defunct DeFi protocol

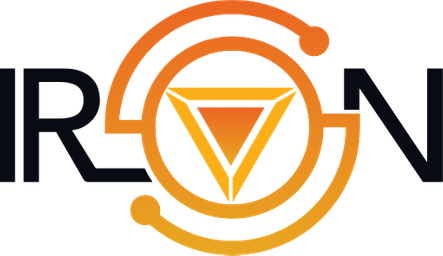

Denominations
- Symbol: IRON (stablecoin), TITAN
- Code: IRON

Development
- Initial release: May 29, 2021; 4 years ago
- Development status: Defunct (collapsed on 17 June 2021)
- Project fork of: Frax
- Written in: Solidity
- Operating system: EVM-compatible (Polygon)
- Developer: Anonymous
- Source model: Open source

Ledger
- Ledger start: 29 May 2021
- Hash function: Proof-of-stake (Polygon consensus)
- Supply limit: 1,000,000,000 TITAN

Website
- Website: iron.finance

Iron Finance was a decentralized finance (DeFi) protocol on the Polygon blockchain.

== History ==
Iron Finance was founded by anonymous developers as a fork of the Frax protocol. Its early investors included Mark Cuban.

In June 2021, the value of the protocol's tokens collapsed after large holders began liquidating their TITAN positions at peak prices, causing both the IRON stablecoin and TITAN token to fall sharply. The situation worsened when a smart contract malfunction temporarily prevented holders from redeeming IRON.

Iron Finance denied that the collapse was a rug pull, stating in a blog post that it resulted from a bank run triggered by the protocol's algorithmic design. Forbes described the event as a "wave of panic selling" after major investors sold large volumes of TITAN. The price decline exposed a design flaw that created arbitrage opportunities, accelerating further sell-offs.

== Tokens ==
IRON was an algorithmic stablecoin backed by 75 percent USDC and 25 percent TITAN. The Target Collateral Ratio (TCR) determined the proportion of USDC required to mint $1 worth of IRON, with the remainder supplied by TITAN at market value. Users could redeem IRON for USDC and TITAN based on the Effective Collateral Ratio (ECR), which reflected the proportion of USDC per $1 of IRON redeemed. Both ratios adjusted based on IRON's price relative to its $1 peg and the protocol's USDC reserves.

TITAN was the protocol's native token and had no governance or ownership rights. It was required for minting IRON and could be staked in liquidity pools to facilitate trading.

The protocol's partial-collateral model contributed to its failure. A rapid increase in TITAN's price prompted large holders to sell, which triggered a negative feedback loop known as a "death spiral." TITAN's value fell to near zero, and IRON lost its dollar peg. The collapse resulted in an estimated $2 billion in losses and is widely cited as the first major DeFi "bank run."

== Liquidity pools ==
Iron Finance operated four liquidity pools across three pairs: USDC–IRON (two pools), TITAN–IRON, and TITAN–MATIC. Liquidity providers earned TITAN as incentives.

== Tokenomics ==
Iron Finance planned a total supply of 1 billion TITAN tokens. Of these, 700 million were allocated as rewards over 36 months, and 300 million were reserved for protocol sponsors, vesting linearly over 12 months.

== See also ==
- TerraUSD
