= Junggok station =

Metro station in Seoul, South Korea

Coordinates: 37°33′57″N 127°05′03″E

중곡; Junggok
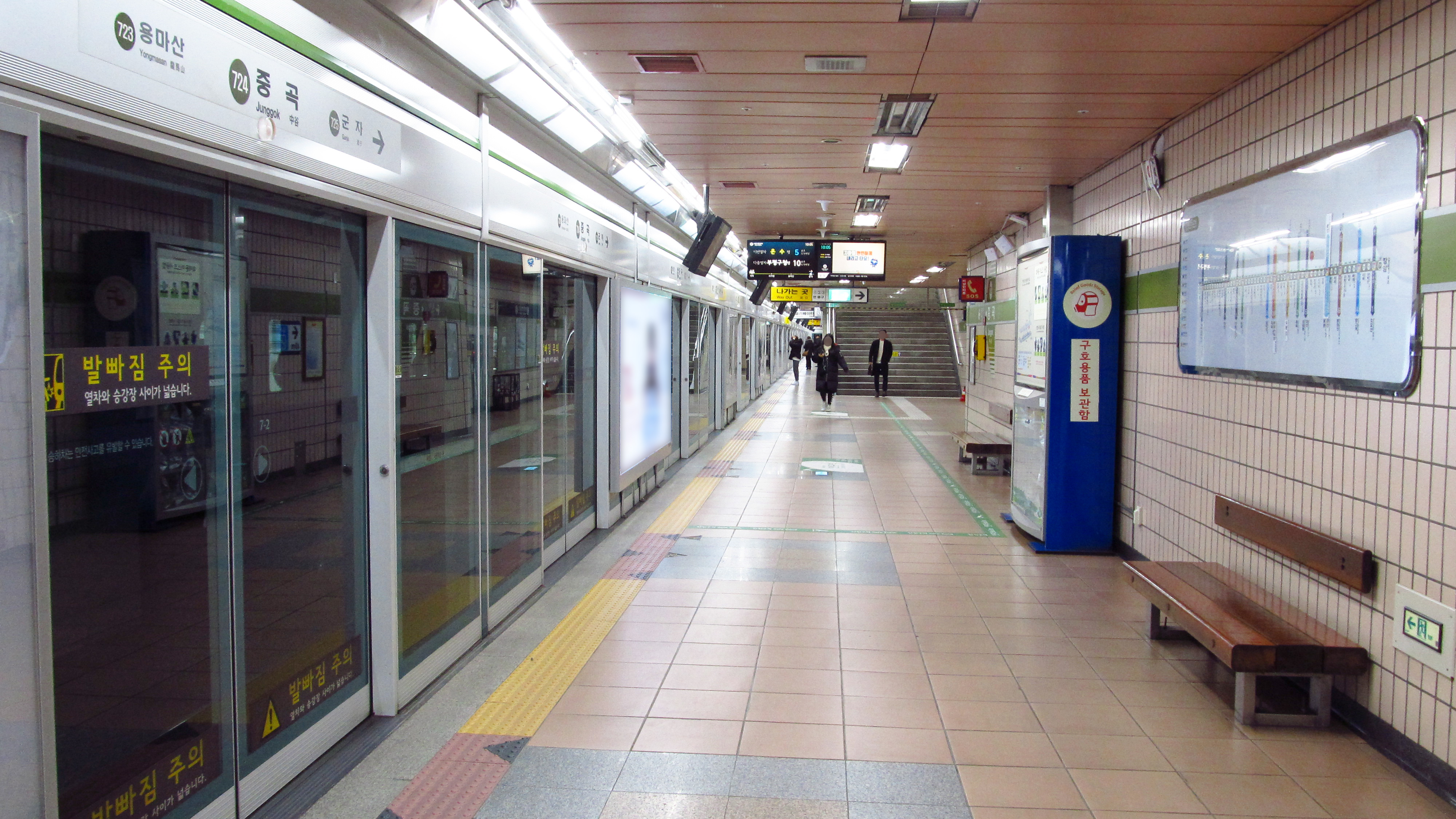
- Station Platform

Korean name
- Hangul: 중곡역
- Hanja: 中谷驛
- Revised Romanization: Junggok-yeok
- McCune–Reischauer: Chunggok-yŏk

General information
- Location: 167 Junggok-dong, Gwangjin-gu, Seoul
- Operated by: Seoul Metro
- Line(s): Line 7
- Platforms: 2
- Tracks: 2

Construction
- Structure type: Underground

Key dates
- October 11, 1996: Line 7 opened

Junggok Station (Korean: 중곡역) is a station on the Seoul Subway Line 7. It is the closest station to Daewon Foreign Language High School.

== Station layout ==
Yongmasan ↑
| N/B
↓ Gunja

Southbound	← ● Line 7 toward Seongnam
Northbound	● Line 7 toward Jangam →

Preceding station	Seoul Metropolitan Subway	Following station
Yongmasan towards Jangam	Line 7	Gunja towards Seongnam
