= Yongmasan station =

Station of the Seoul Metropolitan Subway

Coordinates: 37°34′25″N 127°05′12″E

용마산 (용마폭포공원); Yongmasan (Yongma Falls Park)
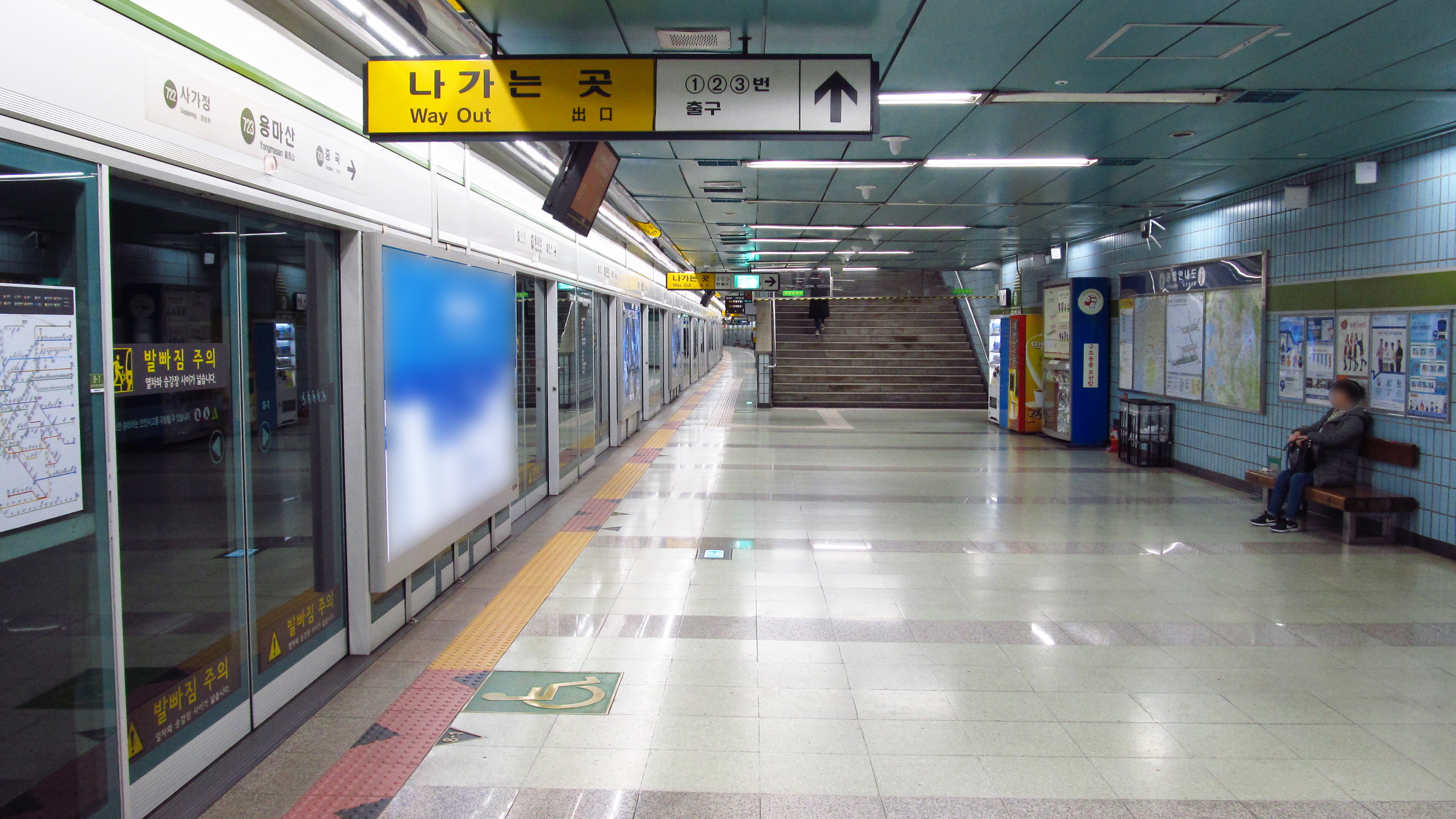
- Station Platform

Korean name
- Hangul: 용마산역
- Hanja: 龍馬山驛
- Revised Romanization: Yongmasan-yeok
- McCune–Reischauer: Yongmasan-yŏk

General information
- Location: 76-1 Myeonmok 4-dong, Jungnang-gu, Seoul
- Operated by: Seoul Metro
- Line(s): Line 7
- Platforms: 2
- Tracks: 2

Construction
- Structure type: Underground

Key dates
- October 11, 1996: Line 7 opened

Yongmasan Station is a station on the Seoul Subway Line 7.

== Station layout ==
Sagajeong ↑
| N/B
↓ Junggok

Southbound	← ● Line 7 toward Seongnam
Northbound	● Line 7 toward Jangam →

Preceding station	Seoul Metropolitan Subway	Following station
Sagajeong towards Jangam	Line 7	Junggok towards Seongnam
