= Financial Innovation and Technology for the 21st Century Act =

US bill to address treatment of digital assets

- Long title: To provide for a system of regulation of digital assets by the Commodity Futures Trading Commission and the Securities and Exchange Commission, and for other purposes.
- Acronyms (colloquial): FIT21

Legislative history
- Introduced in the House of Representatives as H.R. 4763 by Glenn Thompson (R-PA) on July 20, 2023; Passed the House on 22 May 2024 (279–136)

The Financial Innovation and Technology for the 21st Century Act (FIT21) was a bill passed in the lower house of Congress in May 2024 to explicitly address the treatment of digital assets under U.S. law. However, the bill never passed the Senate and did not become law.

The House Financial Services Committee asserts that the FIT21 Act is "an important step towards achieving regulatory clarity for digital assets", with intent to offer strong consumer safeguards and the regulatory clarity that is necessary for the digital asset industry in the United States to prosper. The legislation defines responsibilities between various US agencies, notably between the Commodity Futures Trading Commission (CFTC) for digital commodities and the Securities and Exchange Commission (SEC) for securities and firms that deal in them.

The legislation had bipartisan support with both Democrats and Republicans sponsoring the bill. The proposed legislation excludeed certain stablecoins from both CFTC and SEC regulation, "except for fraud and certain activities by registered firms."

== History ==
The bill was first introduced "into the House Financial Services Committee and the Committee on Agriculture in June 2023."

In early May 2024, the bill was jointly approved by both the Financial Services committee and the Ag committee (which has jurisdiction for law related to commodity exchanges). This set the stage for consideration of the bill by the entire U.S. House of Representatives in late May.

On 22 May 2024 the bill was passed by the full House by a vote of 279–136, with 71 Democrats and 208 Republicans voting to support the measure. The bill passed over the vocal opposition of President Biden and SEC Chair Gary Gensler.

The bill was not subsequently passed by the U.S. Senate and so did not become law.

== Provisions ==
Financial Innovation and Technology for the 21st Century Act was summarized by the Congressional Research Service as follows:

"This bill establishes a regulatory framework for digital assets.

"The Commodity Futures Trading Commission (CFTC) must regulate a digital asset as a commodity if the blockchain, or digital ledger, on which it runs is functional and decentralized. The bill classifies a blockchain as decentralized if, among other requirements, no person has unilateral authority to control the blockchain or its usage, and no issuer or affiliated person has control of 20% or more of the digital asset or the voting power of the digital asset. In addition, the bill provides the CFTC with exclusive regulatory authority over cash or spot markets for digital commodities.

"The Securities and Exchange Commission (SEC) must regulate a digital asset as a security if its associated blockchain is functional but not decentralized. However, the bill establishes certain exceptions to SEC regulation for digital assets that limit annual sales, restrict nonaccredited investor access, and satisfy disclosure and compliance requirements. The bill also sets forth requirements for primary and secondary market transactions.

"The CFTC and SEC must jointly issue rules to define terms and exempt dually registered exchanges from duplicative rules.

"The bill excludes permitted stablecoins from CFTC and SEC regulation, except regarding anti-fraud authority and specified transactions on registered entities."

== See also ==
- Markets in Crypto-Assets
- GENIUS Act
- Digital Asset Market Clarity Act
