= Sagajeong station =

Metro station in Seoul, South Korea

Coordinates: 37°34′51″N 127°05′18″E

사가정 (녹색병원); Sagajeong (Green Hospital)
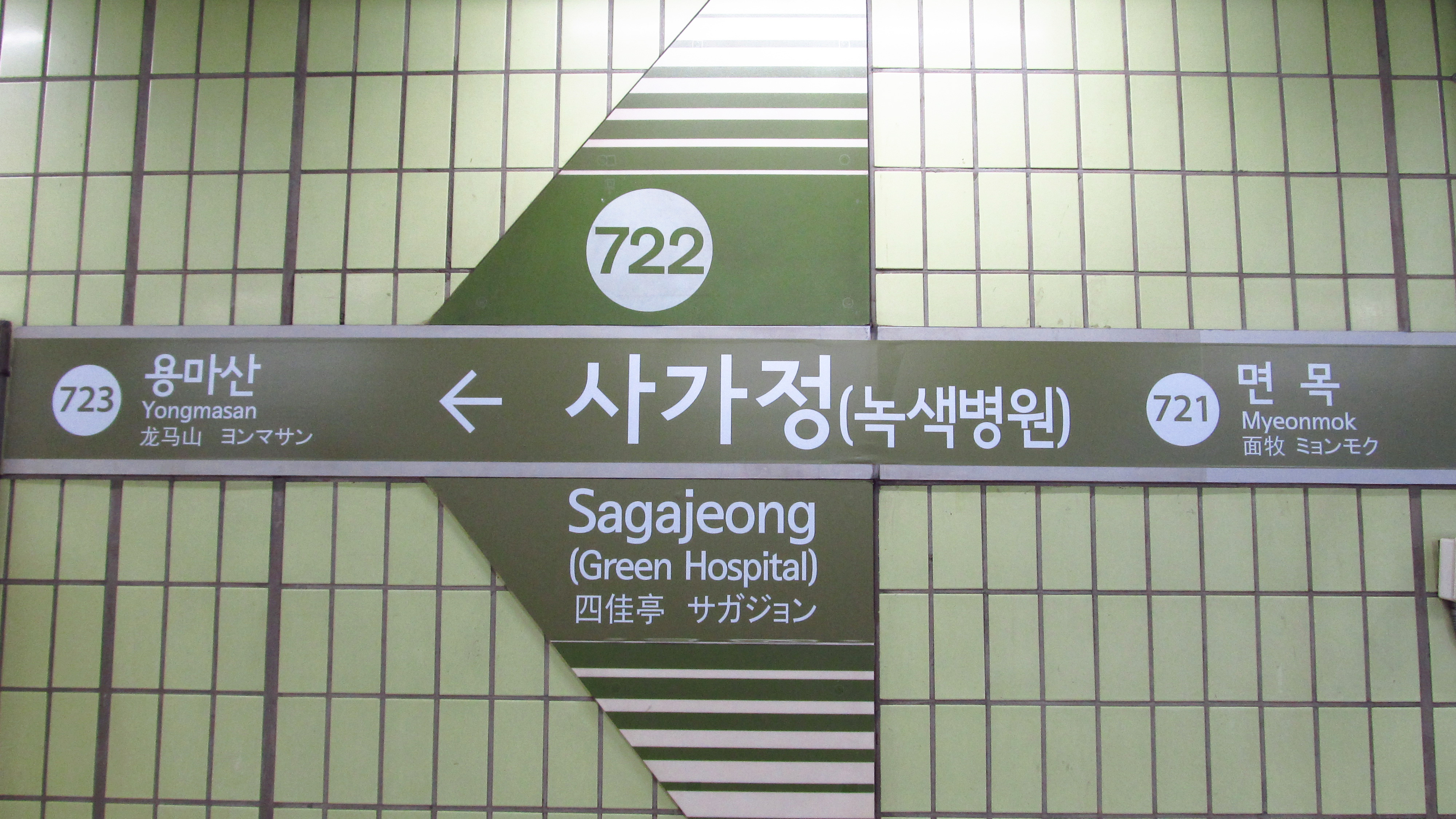
- Station Sign

Korean name
- Hangul: 사가정역
- Hanja: 四佳亭驛
- Revised Romanization: Sagajeong-yeok
- McCune–Reischauer: Sagajŏng-yŏk

General information
- Location: 496 Myeonmok-dong, Jungnang-gu, Seoul
- Operated by: Seoul Metro
- Line(s): Line 7
- Platforms: 2
- Tracks: 2

Construction
- Structure type: Underground

Key dates
- October 11, 1996: Line 7 opened

Sagajeong Station is a station on the Seoul Subway Line 7.

== Station layout ==
Myeonmok ↑
| N/B
↓ Yongmasan

Southbound	← ● Line 7 toward Seongnam
Northbound	● Line 7 toward Jangam →

Preceding station	Seoul Metropolitan Subway	Following station
Myeonmok towards Jangam	Line 7	Yongmasan towards Seongnam
