= Myeonmok station =

Metro station in Jungnang-gu, Seoul, South Korea

면목 (서일대입구); Myeonmok (Seoil Univ.)
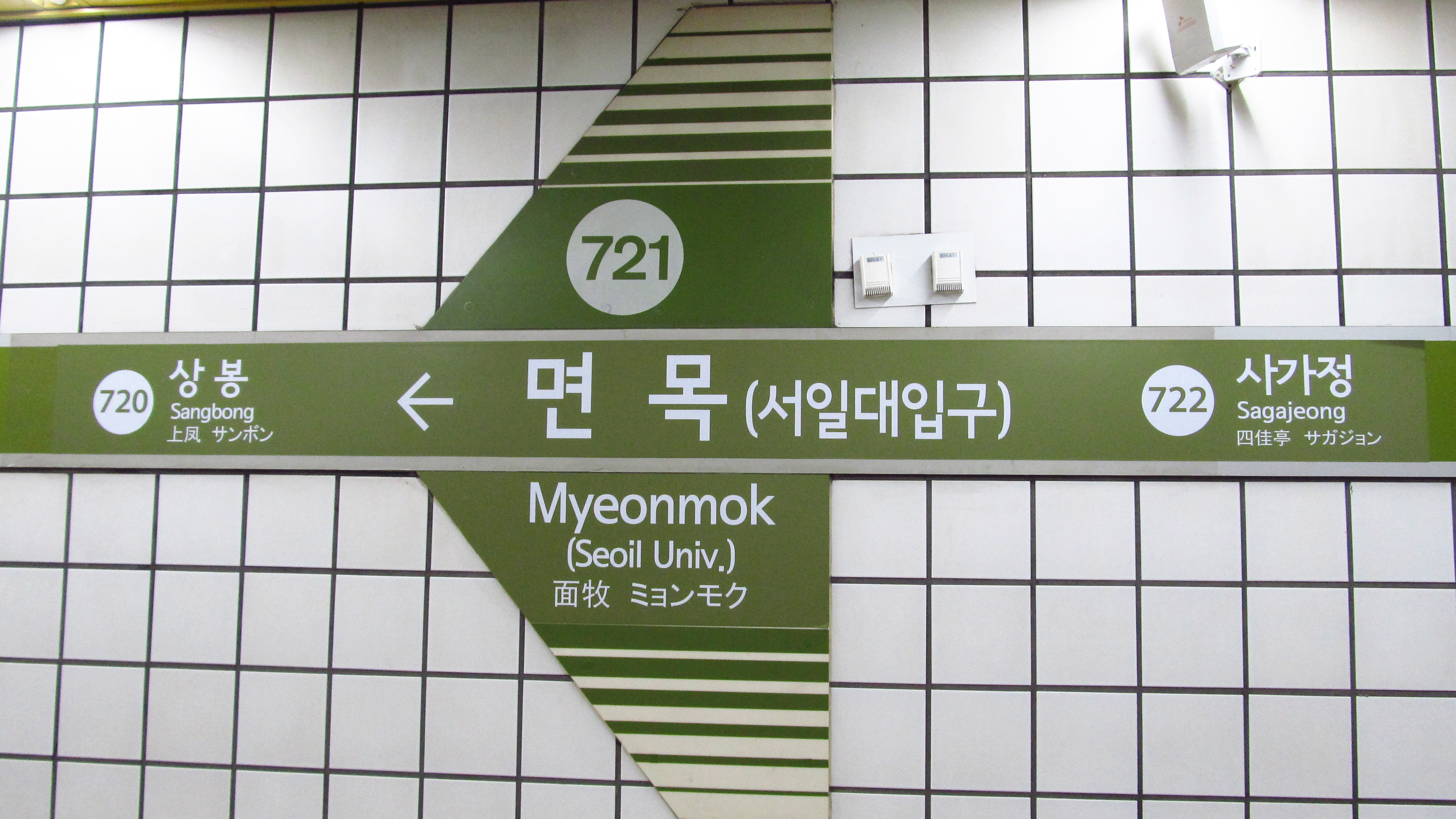
- Station Sign

Korean name
- Hangul: 면목역
- Hanja: 面牧驛
- Revised Romanization: Myeonmok-yeok
- McCune–Reischauer: Myŏnmok-yŏk

General information
- Location: 120 Beonji Myeonmok-dong, Jungnang-gu, Seoul
- Coordinates: 37°35′19″N 127°05′15″E
- Operated by: Seoul Metro
- Line(s): Line 7
- Platforms: 2
- Tracks: 2

Construction
- Structure type: Underground

Key dates
- October 11, 1996: Line 7 opened

Myeonmok Station is a station on the Seoul Subway Line 7.

== Station layout ==
Sangbong ↑
| N/B
↓ Sagajeong

Southbound	← ● Line 7 toward Seongnam
Northbound	● Line 7 toward Jangam →

Preceding station	Seoul Metropolitan Subway	Following station
Sangbong towards Jangam	Line 7	Sagajeong towards Seongnam
