= Daniel Shin =

South Korean businessman (born 1985)

- Born: Shin Hyun-seung; 12 November 1985 (age 40); Seoul, South Korea
- Education: Thomas Jefferson High School for Science and Technology; The Wharton School (BS)
- Occupations: Businessman; investor
- Years active: 2010–

Shin Hyun-seung (Korean: 신현승; born 12 November 1985), commonly known as Daniel Shin, is a South Korean businessman and investor. He is founder and CEO of the fintech company PortOne Global. Shin is a founding partner at Bass Ventures, a venture capital fund.

Shin is also the founder and former CEO of the e-commerce platform Ticket Monster and a co-founder of Terraform Labs, the parent company of the crashed stablecoin TerraUSD and cryptocurrency Luna.

== Early life and education ==
Shin was born in Seoul, South Korea, on 12 November 1985. Him and his family moved to the Washington, D.C., when Shin was 9. He graduated from the Thomas Jefferson High School for Science and Technology in 2004, and attended the Wharton School at the University of Pennsylvania from 2004 to 2008, where he received a Bachelor of Science in economics.

== Early career ==
In 2007, Shin co-founded Invite Media, an advertising agency for which he raised US$1 million for. He later worked as an analyst at McKinsey & Company until 2010.

== Career ==
In 2010, Shin returned to South Korea and started Ticket Monster. The company was modeled after Groupon, but later focused on mobile commerce. It was acquired for $260 million to Groupon in 2014.

In 2011, Shin co-founded Fast Track Asia, a business incubator. In 2017, he founded Bass Ventures to invest in blockchain companies.

In 2018, Shin founded PortOne Global, a B2B fintech company specializing in payment orchestration.

=== Terraform Labs ===
Shin co-founded Terraform Labs with Do Kwon. He served as a board member and advisor. Following the collapse of the Terra ecosystem in May 2022, Shin was indicted in South Korea in 2023 on charges related to the collapse, which he has denied, asserting that he had no involvement in the company's operations after 2020. Shin's Chai Corporation, a Terra-ecosystem payment service company that he founded, closed its entire B2C business as a result.
