= Junghwa-dong =

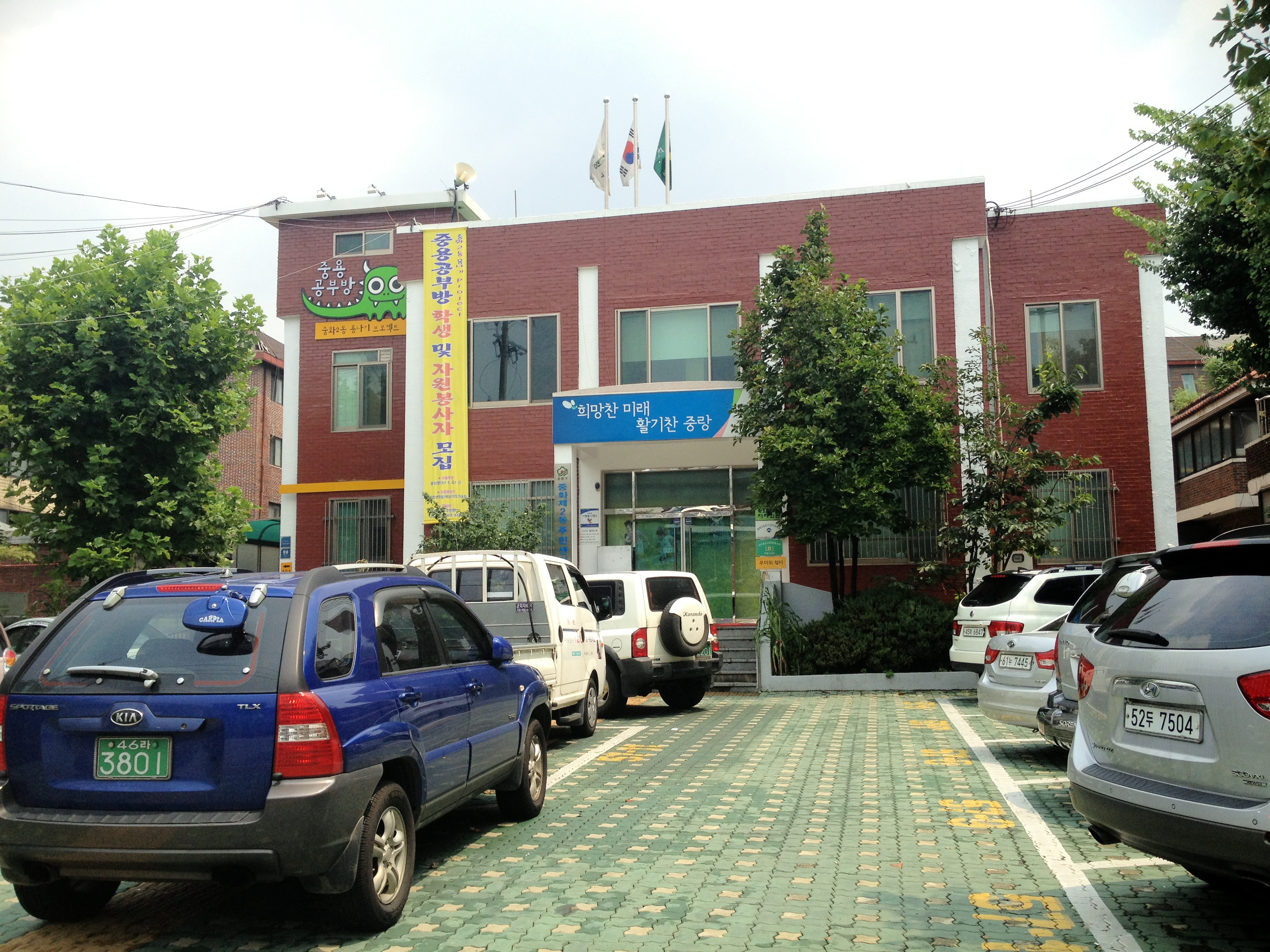
- Jungnang Junghwa 2-dong Community Service Center
- Country: South Korea

Area
  - Total: 1.66 km^{2} (0.64 sq mi)

Population (2001)
  - Total: 60,928
  - Density: 36,700/km^{2} (95,100/sq mi)

Korean name
- Hangul: 중화동
- Hanja: 中和洞
- RR: Junghwa-dong
- MR: Chunghwa-dong

Junghwa-dong (Korean: 중화동) is a dong (neighbourhood) of Jungnang District, Seoul, South Korea.

== See also ==
- Administrative divisions of South Korea
