= Markets in Crypto-Assets =

EU regulation on crypto assets

Regulation (EU) 2023/1114
- European Union regulation
- Text with EEA relevance
- Title: Regulation (EU) 2023/1114 of the European Parliament and of the Council of 31 May 2023 on markets in crypto-assets, and amending Regulations (EU) No 1093/2010 and (EU) No 1095/2010 and Directives 2013/36/EU and (EU) 2019/1937
- Made by: European Parliament and Council of the European Union
- Made under: Article 114 of the TFEU
- Journal reference: L 150, 9 June 2023, p. 40–205

History
- Date made: 31 May 2023
- Implementation date: 30 December 2024
- Applies from: 30 December 2024

Preparative texts
- Commission proposal: COM (2020) 593 - 2020/0265/COD

Markets in Crypto-Assets (MiCA or MiCAR) is a regulation in European Union (EU) law that establishes a regulatory framework for crypto-assets in the EU, including cryptocurrencies, security tokens and stablecoins. It was adopted by the EU Parliament on 20 April 2023 and has applied in full since December 2024.

== Function ==
MiCA is similar in scope to the EU's Markets in Financial Instruments Directive (MiFID), which regulates securities markets, investment intermediaries and trading venues. It covers crypto-asset issuers, trading platforms, exchanges and custodian wallet providers, and permits banks, investment firms and other financial institutions authorised under MiFID II to engage in crypto-asset activities. Its scope is broader than the United Kingdom's crypto regulatory framework, which initially covers only a limited set of crypto assets.

MiCA was introduced in two phases. The first, effective from 30 June 2024, covers authorisation and supervision of asset-referenced tokens (ART) and e-money tokens (EMT). The second, effective from 30 December 2024, covers other crypto-assets and crypto-asset service providers (CASPs). Related technical standards on own funds, qualified holdings, stress testing and remuneration for ART and EMT issuers have been drafted by the European Securities and Markets Authority (ESMA) and issued by the European Commission.

== History ==
Groundwork for MiCA began in 2018 amid growing public interest in cryptocurrencies. By 2024, an estimated 31 million people in Europe held crypto-assets. The European Commission adopted a digital finance package that included MiCA in September 2020, followed by discussion among preparatory bodies including the EU Council, the European Central Bank and the Economic and Social Committee.

The EU Parliament passed MiCA in 2022 after eighteen months of debate. Rules on stablecoins took effect in June 2024, and rules affecting crypto-asset service providers took effect in December 2024. Under MiCA, service providers with fewer than 15 million active users in Europe are supervised by national authorities rather than the European Banking Authority or the European Central Bank. Elizabeth McCaul of the ECB Supervisory Board said the threshold would probably have excluded Binance and FTX before its collapse, and warned of gaps in the regulatory framework.

Société Générale became the first major bank to list a stablecoin under MiCA, doing so on the Luxembourg-based exchange Bitstamp in December 2023. In May 2024 the EBA published final draft regulatory and implementing technical standards under MiCA, applicable from 30 June 2024.

The transitional period expired across the EU on 1 July 2026. In a statement issued on 17 April 2026. ESMA said any entity providing crypto-asset services to EU clients without a MiCA license after that date would be in breach of EU law, and instructed unauthorised providers to have wind-down and client migration plans in place while urging national competent authorities to take enforcement action against non-compliants firms.

== Licensing ==
Several firms obtained MiCA authorisation in 2025 and 2026, including Bitpanda from Germany's BaFin in January 2025, BitGo Europe from BaFin in May 2025, later extended across the EEA, Paybis from the Bank of Latvia with a dual MiCA and PSD2 licence in May 2026, and Coinbase from Luxembourg's Commission de Surveillance du Secteur Financier in June 2026, consolidating its national licences into a single EU-wide authorisation. Binance withdrew its licence application in Greece in June 2026 and paused crypto services to EU customers pending relicensing elsewhere in the bloc.

== See also ==
- Financial Innovation and Technology for the 21st Century Act
- GENIUS Act
- Regulation of cryptocurrency
