= Terra (blockchain) =

Blockchain protocol and payment platform

- Developer(s): Terraform Labs
- Initial release: 24 April 2019
- Website: terra.money

Terra is a blockchain protocol and payment platform used for algorithmic stablecoins. The project was created in 2018 by Terraform Labs, a startup co-founded by Do Kwon and Daniel Shin. It is best known for its Terra algorithmic stablecoin and the associated LUNA reserve asset cryptocurrency.

In May 2022, the Terra blockchain was temporarily halted after the collapse of the algorithmic stablecoin TerraUSD (UST) and the cryptocurrency LUNA, an event that wiped out almost $45 billion in market capitalization within a week. On January 21, 2024, the company filed for bankruptcy.

== Design ==
Terra is a blockchain that leverages fiat-pegged stablecoins to power a payment system. For consensus, the Terra blockchain uses a proof-of-stake codesign. Several stablecoins are built atop the Terra protocol, including TerraUSD, which was the third largest stablecoin by market capitalization before its collapse in May 2022. The Terra blockchain has a fully-functional ecosystem of decentralized applications (or DApps), such as Anchor, Mirror, and Pylon, which utilized the stable-coin infrastructure of Terra.

Terra is a group of algorithmic stablecoins, named according to the currencies to which they were pegged—for example, TerraUSD (UST) was pegged to the U.S. dollar. LUNA served as the primary backing asset for Terra, also used as a governance token for users to vote on Terra community proposals. UST stablecoins were not backed by U.S. dollars; instead, they were designed to maintain their peg through a complex model called "burn and mint equilibrium". This method uses a two-token system in which one token is supposed to remain stable (UST) while the other (LUNA) is meant to absorb volatility.

The Anchor Protocol was a lending and borrowing protocol built on the Terra chain. Investors who deposited UST in the Anchor Protocol were receiving a 19.45% yield paid out from Terra's reserves. Due to such a high yield, some critics raised concerns that Kwon's stablecoin model could function like a "ginormous Ponzi scheme". Mirror Protocol was another Terra chain project, which designed and offered financial derivatives designed to "mirror" traditional listed stocks.

== History ==
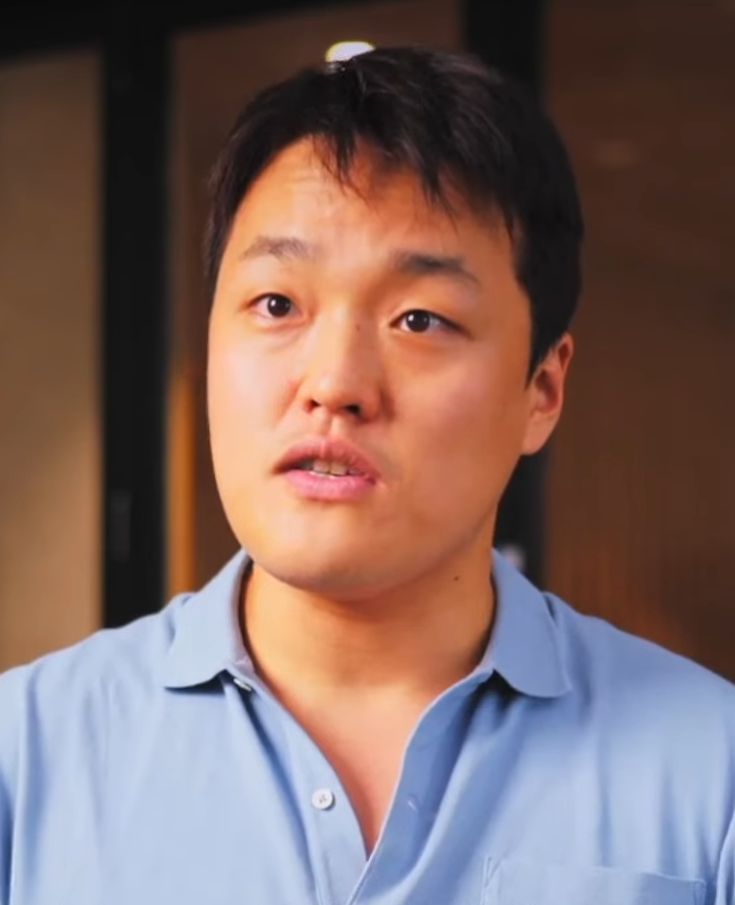
Do-hyung Kwon, founder of Terraform Labs, creator of TerraUSD

In 2018, Do Kwon and Daniel Shin (also known as Shin Hyun-sung) co-founded Terraform Labs in Seoul, South Korea. In 2019, Terraform Labs launched its first cryptocurrency token. Terraform Labs raised more than $200 million from investment firms such as Arrington Capital, Coinbase Ventures, Galaxy Digital and Lightspeed Venture Partners.

In January 2022, the Luna Foundation Guard (LFG) was established as a non-profit based in Singapore, with Do Kwon as director. Terraform Labs allocated a portion of the profit from UST sales to Luna Foundation Guard, to be used as reserves to stabilize the price of UST. As of 7 May, just before UST broke its peg, LFG held reserves of 80,394 bitcoin worth approximately $2.4 billion. Bitcoin was the largest portion of the reserve, though LFG also held various other stablecoins and cryptocurrencies.

In February 2022, Terra and the Washington Nationals Major League Baseball team announced they had entered into a sponsorship agreement which provided stadium and television branding, as well as the rebranding of the Washington Nationals club and lounge to the "Terra Club". The deal was originally proposed to the Terra community by Kwon, referring only to an unnamed "sports franchise in one of the four major American professional sports leagues", and the community agreed to pay $38.15 million for a five-year exclusive partnership.

The founders Kwon and Shin each owned one share of Terraform Labs, giving each founder 50% of the controlling power. Kwon later enlarged his stock pool to eleven shares, giving him 91.7% ownership and Shin the remaining 8.3%. Shin and Chai Corporation, a Terra-ecosystem payment service company that he founded, announced on 18 May 2022 that Shin no longer held any ownership stock in Terraform Labs. However, the Singaporean Account and Corporate Regulatory Authority revealed that Shin still held 8.3% Terraform Labs ownership, and Chai Corporation announced that Shin was not able to "finish liquidating his remaining ownership in time" despite having the same share of ownership as of 18 May. The documents from the Singaporean authority also revealed that as of 18 May, Shin held 51.2% of ownership and Kwon 22.4% of Chai Holdings, the parent company of Chai Corporation.

=== Collapse ===
Beginning on 9 May 2022, the tokens made headlines after UST began to break its peg to the US dollar. Over the next week, the price of UST plunged to 10 cents, while LUNA fell to "virtually zero", down from an all-time high of $119.51. Before the crash, LUNA was one of the top ten largest cryptocurrencies on the market. The collapse wiped out almost $45 billion of market capitalization in one week. Terra-Luna operated on a two-coin system protocol that lacked traditional collateral backing. The run was unlikely to have been caused by concentrated third-party manipulation, and was instead precipitated by growing concerns about the sustainability of the system.

On 13 May, Terraform Labs temporarily halted the Terra blockchain in response to the falling prices of UST and LUNA. Despite the company's attempts to stabilize UST and LUNA via its bitcoin and other cryptocurrency reserves from the Luna Foundation Guard, they were unable to reestablish the 1:1 peg of UST to USD. As of 16 May 2022, blockchain analysts claim that the expenditure of the LFO bitcoin reserves still remains unclear.

Likely causes of the collapse included mass withdrawals from the Anchor Protocol days before the collapse, investor concerns about cryptocurrencies more generally, and a drop in the price of bitcoin. During the collapse, holders converted UST into LUNA via the mint-and-burn system, which caused the price of LUNA to collapse due to its increased supply. This in turn destabilized the balancing mechanism between the currencies.

On 25 May, a proposal was approved to reissue a new LUNA cryptocurrency and to decouple from and abandon the devalued UST stablecoin. The original blockchain is now called Terra Classic, and the original LUNA token is called LUNA Classic (LUNC). The new LUNA coin is called "Terra 2.0" by investors, and has lost valuation in the opening days of being listed on exchanges.

In an August 2022 interview on the NFTV series Coinage, months after the collapse, Terra founder Do Kwon remarked that his faith in Terra now "seems super irrational". However, he denied that the Terra system was a ponzi scheme. A later NBER study attributed the run mainly to concerns about the system’s sustainability rather than concentrated market manipulation.

On 23 March 2023 Kwon attempted to travel to Dubai using false Costa Rican documents, while also carrying false Belgian travel documents, but he was intercepted and arrested at Podgorica Airport in Montenegro. A federal grand jury in Manhattan subsequently laid eight charges against Kwon, including securities fraud, commodities fraud, wire fraud and conspiracy. The following month, KBS News reported that prior to the collapse of TerraUSD, Kwon had sent 9 billion won (worth $7 million) to the law firm Kim & Chang.

On January 21, 2024, Terraform Labs declared Chapter 11 bankruptcy in the United States, listing assets and liabilities in the range of $100-$500 million.

In August 2025, Do Kwon pleaded guilty on two fraud charges, and agreed to forfeit US$19 million as part of a plea deal. Sentencing was scheduled for December, with the US government to argue for a sentence of no more than 12 years. On December 11, he was sentenced to 15 years in prison.

The group managing the firm's bankruptcy sued Jane Street Capital in February 2026 for alleged insider trading and a part in the collapse.

== Licensing and regulatory issues ==
Terraform Labs Pte. Ltd., the company behind Terra, is incorporated in Singapore but did not submit an application for a licence under the Payment Services Act according to The Straits Times. It is also not a notified entity, meaning it has not been granted temporary exemption from holding a licence by the Monetary Authority of Singapore. According to documents filed by Kwon at the Supreme Court of Korea's Registry Office, Kwon filed to dissolve the company's Korean entity on 30 April 2022, and was granted approval on 4 May 2022.

The U.S. Securities and Exchange Commission (SEC) issued a subpoena to Terraform Labs and Kwon in 2021, with specific regard to Terraform Labs' Mirror Protocol, which designed and offered financial derivatives that virtually "mirrored" actual listed stocks. Kwon refused the subpoena, and instead announced he would sue the SEC. Despite his attempts to dispute and avoid investigations from the SEC, a U.S. Court hearing in Manhattan in February 2022 ruled in favour of the SEC's right to continue its investigation into Kwon and Terraform Labs. In February 2023, the SEC charged Terraform Labs and Kwon with fraud.

On 18 May, the newly appointed Korean Minister of Justice, Han Dong-hoon, enlarged the economic crimes investigation division of the Seoul Southern District Prosecutor's Office, vowing to "track illegal funds and capital transfers, crack down on tax evasion, audit company finances, compile transaction data, and seize the proceeds of criminal financial activity." On its first day of operation, the Financial and Securities Crimes Joint Investigation Team singled out the LUNA and Terra crisis as its first investigation target.

A class action, Patterson v. TerraForm Labs Pte Ltd. et al, was filed against Terraform Labs and others in the United States District Court for the Northern District of California on 17 June 2022. In September 2022, a $56.9 million class action was filed at the High Court of Singapore against Do Kwon, Terraform Labs, Nikolaos Alexandros Platias and the Luna Foundation Guard.

In June 2022, Yonhap News reported that 15 people, including former Terraform developers for the Anchor lending protocol, had been imposed with travel restrictions by the Korean government. On November 29, 2022, an arrest warrant was issued for Daniel Shin by South Korean prosecutors.

In December 2022, a group of French crypto investors filed a criminal complaint against Binance, accusing the exchange of misleading the public and promoting its services in France before it was legally allowed to do so. According to Reuters, the complaint says Binance carried out marketing campaigns on social media platforms such as Instagram and Telegram when its official registration as a digital financial service was still pending with French authorities.

In April 2024, Binance's U.S. unit convinced a federal court to send to arbitration a proposed class-action lawsuit brought by a user who claimed the cryptocurrency exchange violated federal regulations. The user had bought more than $437,000 in TerraUSD on Binance.US before UST crashed in May 2022 and essentially lost all of its value. He alleged the exchange failed to disclose that UST is a security.

In December 2024, Jump Trading’s Tai Mo Shan Ltd., part of Jump Trading's crypto unit, agreed to pay $123 million to settle SEC claims that it misled investors about the stability of TerraUSD.

== See also ==
- Iron Finance
