= Jungnang District =

District of Seoul, South Korea

Jungnang
- Autonomous District
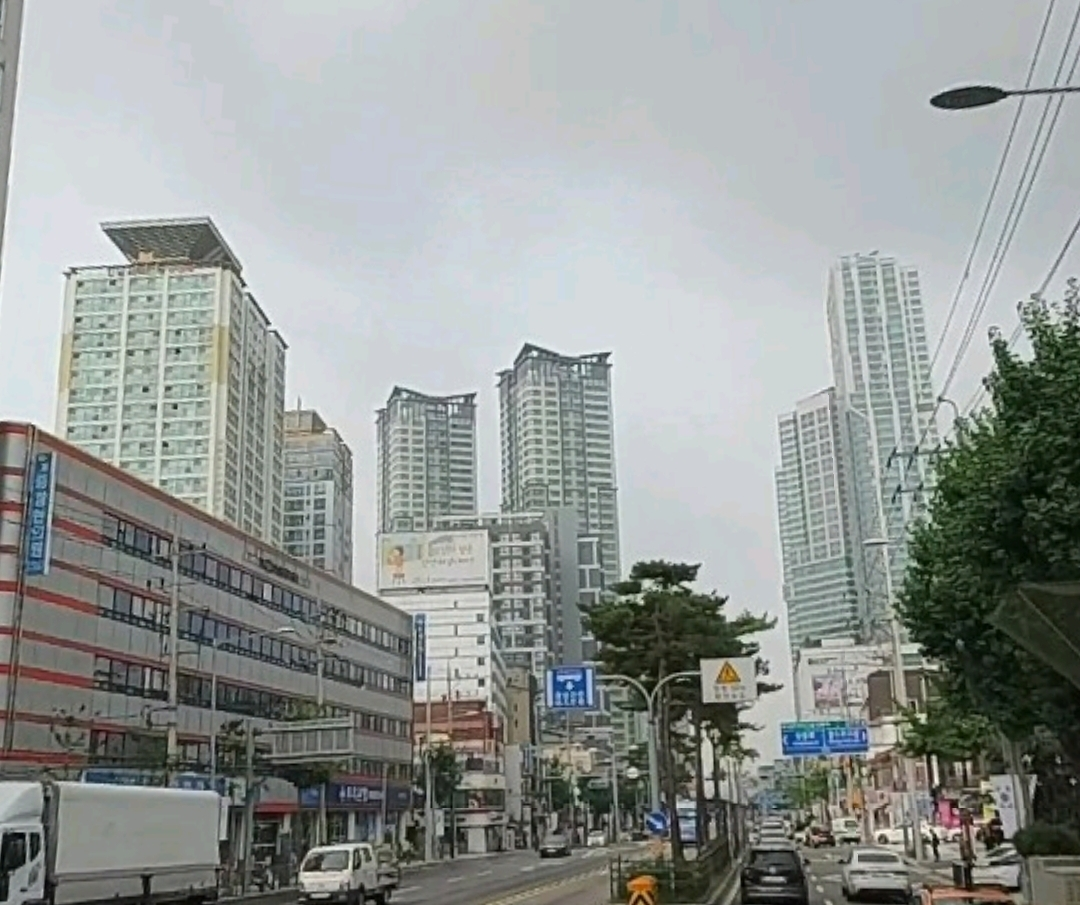
- Sangbong-dong downtown

- Flag

- Location of Jungnang District in Seoul
- Interactive map of Jungnang
- Coordinates: 37.6064°N 127.0926°E
- Country: South Korea
- Region: Sudogwon
- Special City: Seoul
- Administrative dong: 20

Government
  - Body: Jungnang District Council
  - Mayor: Ryu Gyeong-gi (Democratic)
  - MNAs: List of MNAs: Seo Young-kyo (Democratic); Park Hong-keun (Democratic)

Area
  - Total: 18.50 km^{2} (7.14 sq mi)

Population (September 2024)
  - Total: 380,353
  - Density: 20,560/km^{2} (53,250/sq mi)
- Time zone: UTC+9 (Korea Standard Time)
- Postal code: 02000~02399
- Area code: 02-400~
- Website: Jungnang District official website

Korean name
- Hangul: 중랑구
- Hanja: 中浪區
- RR: Jungnang-gu
- MR: Chungnang-gu

Jungnang District (Korean: 중랑구) is one of the 25 gu, or districts, of Seoul, South Korea. It is located on the north side of the Han River.

It is characterized by a typical residential area with many natural green areas such as Yongma, Mangwoo, and Bonghwasan Mountain. It is also a transportation hub in northeastern Seoul as a gateway to Gyeonggi and Gangwon regions.

== History ==
In the current Jungnang District, various relics from the Paleolithic and Bronze Age were excavated in Bonghwasan Mountain and Yongmasan Mountain, which are triangular points centered on Mangusan Mountain, and the history of the Jungnang area dates back to the Paleolithic period of the late 30,000 BC. In particular, traces of Saturn remained in the area from Bongsudae in Sangbong-dong to Myeonmok-dong until the 1960s, indicating that the Jungnang area was a city-state during the late Bronze Age and early Iron Age.During the Three Kingdoms period, it served as a bridgehead for securing the Han River basin in Baekje, and after the Unified Silla period, it became Yangjumok when 12 trees were installed nationwide in 983 of the early Goryeo dynasty. Among the maps of Hansung Ranch, written by Heo Mok in 1663, Jinheonmajeongdo Island shows that the Han River is in the background of Bulamsan Mountain, Achasan Mountain in the north, and Jungnangcheon Stream and parts of Cheonggyecheon Stream and Sinchon in the east are not clear, but Jungnang District and Jungnang District are now. On May 26, 1895, the country was reorganized into 23bu 336-gun by Imperial Decree No. 101 and on August 6 of the following year, the 23bu system was abolished, and the country was divided into 13 degrees, and Yangju was separated from Hansung-bu and belonged to Gyeonggi-do as Yangju-gun. On December 29, 1913, the Jungnang area was part of Guri-myeon (currently Sangbong, Junghwa, Muk, Mangwoo, and Sinnae-dong) in Yangju-gun, Gyeonggi-do, and Ttukdo-myeon (currently Myeonmok-dong, Junggok-dong) in Goyang-gun was incorporated into Seoul on August 15, 1949, and in January 1963, Mangnae-ri in Yangjeong-myeon was reunited. On July 1, 1980, Muk-dong was divided into Muk 1-dong and Mangwoo 2-dong into Mangwoo 2-dong, and on January 1, 1988, five districts in Jungnang, Nowon, Seocho, Yangcheon, and Songpa were expanded, and Jungnang District was separated and newly established from Dongdaemun District.

On January 1, 2008, to improve administrative inefficiency and expand the culture and welfare space of residents, Myeonmok 1-dong and Myeonmok 6-dong were merged into Myeonmokbon-dong, Myeonmok 3-dong and Myeonmok 8-dong into Myeonmok 3-dong, Junghwa 2-dong and Junghwa 3-dong, and Mangwoo 2-dong were merged into Mangwoobon-dong.

== Administrative divisions ==
Administrative divisions

- Junghwa-dong (중화동 中和洞) 1, 2
- Mangu-dong (망우동 忘憂洞) 3, Bondong (1 and 2 are combined in Jan. of 2008)
- Muk-dong (묵동 墨洞) 1, 2
- Myeonmok-dong (면목동 面牧洞) 2, 3, 4, 5, 7, Bondong (1 and 6 are combined in Jan. of 2008)
- Sangbong-dong (상봉동 上鳳洞) 1, 2
- Sinnae-dong (신내동 新內洞) 1, 2

== Transportation ==
=== Railroad ===
- Korail

- Jungang Line

(Dongdaemun-gu) ← Jungnang – Sangbong – Mangu – Yangwon → (Guri)

- Gyeongchun Line

Sangbong – Mangu – Sinnae → (Guri)

- Seoul Metro

- Seoul Subway Line 6

(Nowon-gu) ← Bonghwasan ← Sinnae

- Seoul Subway Line 7

(Nowon-gu) ← Meokgol – Junghwa – Sangbong – Myeonmok – Sagajeong – Yongmasan → (Gwangjin-gu)

== Sister cities ==
- Chongwen, China

== See also ==
- Administrative divisions of South Korea
