= GENIUS Act =

2025 U.S. legislation on stablecoin regulation

- Long title: To provide for the regulation of payment stablecoins, and for other purposes.
- Enacted by: the 119th United States Congress

Citations
- Public law: Pub. L. 119–27 (text) (PDF)

Legislative history
- Introduced in the Senate as S. 1582 by Bill Hagerty (R–TN); Committee consideration by Banking, Housing, and Urban Affairs; passed committee on March 13, 2025 (18–6); Passed the Senate on June 17, 2025 (68–30); Passed the House on July 17, 2025 (308–122); Signed into law by President Donald Trump on July 18, 2025

The Guiding and Establishing National Innovation for U.S. Stablecoins Act (GENIUS Act) is a United States federal law that aims to create a comprehensive regulatory framework for stablecoins. Stablecoins are a type of cryptocurrency that are backed by assets considered to be reliable such as a national currency or a commodity. Stablecoins are typically used to transfer funds between different cryptocurrency tokens.

The act requires stablecoins to be backed one-for-one by U.S. dollars or other low-risk assets.

== History ==
Introduced by Republican senator Bill Hagerty on May 21, 2025, the GENIUS Act is a bipartisan effort to regulate the stablecoin industry. Its companion legislation is the U.S. House of Representatives' Stablecoin Transparency and Accountability for a Better Ledger Economy (STABLE) Act, which had similar goals but differed in some details. The U.S. Senate passed the bill on June 17, 2025, with a bipartisan vote of 68–30; the majority of Republicans and about half of Democrats voted in favor. On July 3, 2025, the House announced it would consider the bill during the week of July 14. The House passed the bill on July 17, 2025 and President Donald Trump signed the new legislation into law the next day. Two other cryptocurrency bills passed in the House but still need Senate approval.

== Regulatory analysis ==
The nonprofit consumer organization Consumer Reports argued the bill does not provide enough consumer protection and allows big tech companies to engage in bank-like activities without being subject to the tougher regulations required of banks.

According to the Oxford Business Law Blog, the GENIUS Act excludes compliant payment stablecoins from the federal definitions of "security" and "commodity", creating what the authors describe as a "jurisdictional carve-out" from SEC and CFTC oversight. Analyses from Brookings also note that GENIUS-regulated stablecoins are not classified as bank deposits lacking FDIC insurance and direct Federal Reserve access placing them in a distinct regulatory category separate from both capital-market instruments and traditional banking products.

New York Attorney General Letitia James and other prosecutors argued that the U.S. GENIUS Act lacked provisions requiring stablecoin issuers to return stolen funds to fraud victims, which they said could allow issuers to retain and profit from proceeds of fraud and hinder law-enforcement efforts.

Economists Max Harris and Kenneth Rogoff argue that there are parallels between the lax and risky regulatory environment created by the GENIUS Act and the chaotic free banking era (1837–1862).

== See also ==
- HR 1919 Anti-CBDC Surveillance State Act
- Financial Innovation and Technology for the 21st Century Act
- Legality of cryptocurrency by country or territory
- Markets in Crypto-Assets
- Crypto-Asset Reporting Framework
