= Do Kwon =

South Korean convicted felon (born 1991)

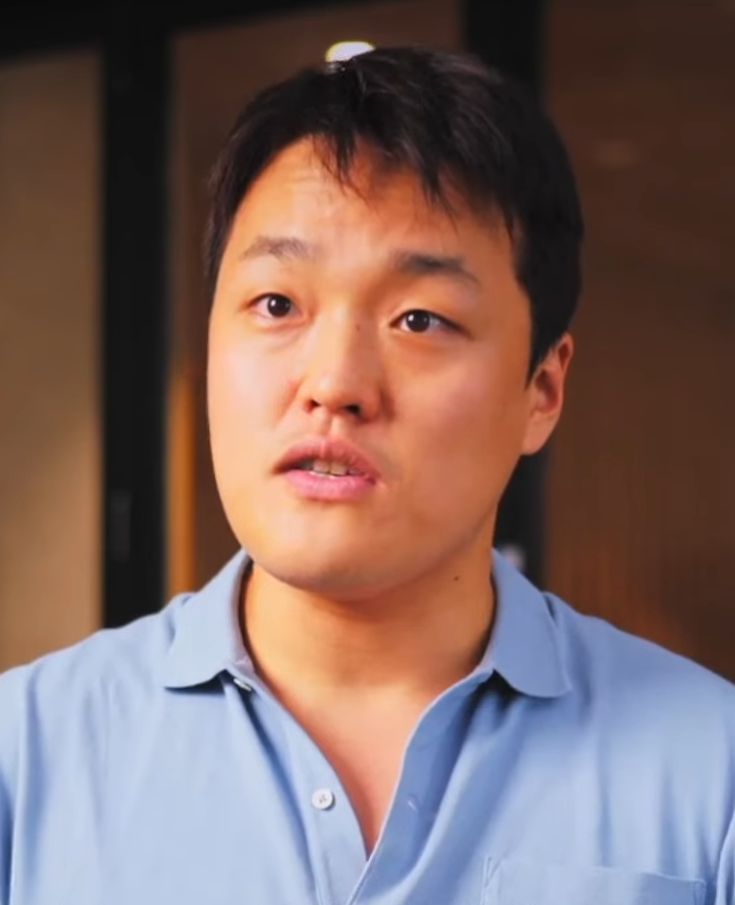
- Kwon in 2022
- Born: Kwon Do-hyung; 6 September 1991 (age 35); Seoul, South Korea
- Education: Daewon Foreign Language High School; Stanford University (BS)
- Occupations: Businessman; software engineer
- Years active: 2015–2023
- Title: Co-founder and CEO of Terra
- Children: 1
- Criminal information
- Criminal information
- Organization: Terra (blockchain)
- Criminal charges: Securities fraud; commodities fraud; wire fraud; conspiracy
- Penalty: 15 years imprisonment

Details
- Date apprehended: 23 March 2023; 3 years ago

Korean name
- Hangul: 권도형
- Hanja: 權渡衡
- RR: Gwon Dohyeong
- MR: Kwŏn Tohyŏng

Kwon Do-hyung (Korean: 권도형; born 6 September 1991), commonly known as Do Kwon, is a South Korean convicted felon, former businessman and software engineer. He was the co-founder and CEO of Terraform Labs, the parent company of crashed stablecoin TerraUSD and cryptocurrency Luna. TerraUSD and Luna collapsed in May 2022, wiping out almost $45 billion market capitalization in one week and causing hundreds of billions in losses in the larger crypto market.

On 23 March 2023, he was arrested in Montenegro while attempting to travel to Dubai using falsified documents. Following his arrest, he was charged by a US federal grand jury of eight counts, including securities fraud, commodities fraud, wire fraud and conspiracy. He was extradited to the United States, where he pleaded guilty to two counts of fraud. He was sentenced to 15 years in prison in December 2025.

== Early life and education ==
Do Kwon was born in Seoul, South Korea, on 6 September 1991. He attended Daewon Foreign Language High School in Seoul and received a Bachelor of Science in Computer Science from Stanford University in 2015.

== Career ==
After graduating in 2015, Kwon worked briefly as a software engineer for both Microsoft and Apple.

In January 2016, he returned to South Korea to develop and found his startup, Anyfi. It was later discovered that the company at which he was CEO had received approximately $600,000 worth of government funding during its initial stages. That involved a conflict of interest, because the funding was approved through a Korean incubator company run by one of the co-founder's parents. Furthermore, internal investigations from the Korean Ministry of SMEs and Startups revealed that the company had received failing grades in initial evaluation reports, and that five counts of the inappropriate use of funding for personnel expenses were exposed, although the money was reported to have been retrieved by the Ministry.

=== Terraform Labs ===
In January 2018, Do Kwon co-founded Terraform Labs Pte. Ltd. with entrepreneur Daniel Shin. Later in 2018, Terraform Labs released a cryptocurrency called Luna. Terraform began selling its stablecoin, TerraUSD (UST), in 2020. The Terra blockchain, which included both UST and Luna, had stable mining incentives that were purported to create an elastic monetary policy, alongside an efficient fiscal policy, to counteract potential low adoption and limited use cases. The UST stablecoin used an algorithm linked to the Luna supply to maintain a value of around $1, unlike other coins that were pegged to cash. The value of Luna eventually reached over $116 in April 2022.

During his time at Terraform Labs, Kwon also worked on various blockchain projects, including Mirror, Prism, Astroport, and Anchor. The Mirror token, known as MIR, ran on a decentralized finance platform related to Terra. MIR allowed people to disregard restrictions on stocks and other assets by making it easier to create and trade synthetic versions.

Following the crash of sister currencies Luna and TerraUSD in May 2022, Terraform Labs began trading a new cryptocurrency termed Luna 2.0 in June 2022. However, the release of Luna 2.0, later called LUNA on trading platforms, led to push-back from investors and critics. As a result of the crash, TerraUSD and Luna are now referred to as TerraClassicUSD and LUNC, respectively.

== Legal issues and arrest ==
=== Regulatory issues ===
The U.S. Securities and Exchange Commission (SEC) began an investigation of Terraform Labs in June 2022 to determine if the marketing of the TerraUSD stablecoin violated federal regulations on securities and investment products. Following the crash in May 2022, the SEC investigation seeks to determine whether TerraUSD and its underlying algorithms worked as marketed, or if it violated federal investor protection regulations. Despite Terraform Labs being based in Singapore, TerraUSD falls under SEC's regulations as Americans bought the token to fund businesses or seek profit. In February 2023, the SEC charged Kwon and Terraform Labs with fraud.

On 17 May 2022, members of the Korean parliament and government authorities called for a parliamentary hearing regarding Terraform Labs and its founder Kwon, citing the lack of regulatory framework as the main reason for the investigation.

On 18 May 2022, following investigations led by the National Tax Service of Korea, Terraform Labs founders Kwon and Daniel Shin were asked to pay additional taxes worth approximately $100 million in December 2021. However, the two founders refused to pay on the grounds that the subsidiaries Terraform Labs Pte. Ltd. (Singapore) and Terraform Labs Virgin Islands are not Korean entities. Regardless, the National Tax Service has claimed that since "the founders had made practical management decisions" during their time as official residents in Korea, the transfer of funds between the subsidiaries and their profits made by each entity need to obey Korean jurisdiction.

Before the SEC investigation of TerraUSD, the U.S. Securities and Exchange Commission issued a subpoena to Terraform Labs and Kwon in 2021, specifically relating to Terraform Labs' "Mirror Protocol", which designed and offered financial derivatives that virtually "mirrored" listed stocks. Kwon responded by stating that he wouldn't comply with the demands and instead would be suing the SEC. According to documents filed by Kwon at the Supreme Court of Korea's Registry Office, Kwon filed to dissolve the company's Korean entity on 30 April 2022 which was approved on 4 May 2022.

=== Collapse of Terra blockchain ===
Beginning on 9 May 2022, Terraform Labs made headlines after UST started to break its peg to the US dollar. Over the next week, the price of UST plunged to 10 cents, while Luna fell from an all-time high of $119.51 to "virtually zero." The collapse wiped out almost $45 billion of market capitalization in one week.

The collapse of the Terra blockchain began on 7 May 2022, when several prominent investors reportedly sold over $285 million worth of UST on Binance. On 8 May 2022, the value of UST hit a low of $0.985. In response, the Luna Foundation Guard (LFG), which was established to serve as a reserve for Luna, loaned a total of $1.5 billion in an effort to defend the peg and mitigate the volatility of UST.

=== Class actions and forced arbitration ===
With approximately 200,000 South Korean Luna investors harmed by the crash, groups of Korean investors announced that they would be filing a class-action lawsuit against Terraform Labs. The South Korean government also announced that it would pursue Kwon on criminal charges. As of 17 May, more than 1,600 investors have signed up for the lawsuit with domestic law firms LKB & Partners LLC and Kisung LLC.

In the United States, a class action, Patterson v. TerraForm Labs Pte Ltd. et al., was filed against Kwon and others in the United States District Court for the Northern District of California on 17 June 2022. Briefs are being presented to the United States District Court for the Northern District of California under the counsel of Scott + Scott Attorneys at Law LLP, The Rosen Law Firm PA, Kahn Swick Foti LLP, and Bragar Eagel & Squire P.C., accusing Do Kwon and Terraform Labs of soliciting unregistered securities while misleading investors about their viability.

In September 2022, a US$56.9 million class action was filed at the High Court of Singapore against Kwon, Terraform Labs, Nikolaos Alexandros Platias and the Luna Foundation Guard.

In February 2023, US financial regulators charged Do Kwon and TerraForm Labs with "orchestrating a multi-billion dollar crypto asset securities fraud".

On 5 April 2024, a jury in the United States District Court for the Southern District of New York found Do Kwon and Terraform Labs PTE Ltd. liable for defrauding investors in crypto asset securities. The SEC had argued that Kwon secretly sought third-party financing after TerraUSD slipped from its stablecoin peg and then falsely stated in May 2021 that the recovery was because of algorithmic stability. The SEC also said that Kwon and Terraform had falsely claimed that its blockchain was used for business transactions on South Korea's Chai app.

=== Arrest, conviction, and sentencing ===
On 21 June 2022, YTN reported that prosecutors were looking to invalidate Kwon's South Korean passport. On 14 September 2022, a South Korean court issued an arrest warrant for Kwon and five others on allegations of violations of Korean capital markets law. The prosecutor's office said all six individuals were located in Singapore. On 19 September 2022, the Seoul Southern District Prosecutors' Office said they had begun the procedure to place Kwon on the Interpol red notice list and revoke his passport. In December 2022, South Korean authorities shared their belief that Kwon was hiding in Serbia, which did not have an extradition treaty with South Korea.

On 23 March 2023, Kwon was arrested at Podgorica Airport in Montenegro, which also did not have an extradition treaty with either South Korea or the United States, while attempting to travel to Dubai using falsified Costa Rican documents. He was also found to be carrying falsified Belgian travel documents. Following his arrest, he was charged by a federal grand jury in Manhattan of eight counts, including securities fraud, commodities fraud and wire fraud and conspiracy. One month later, KBS News reported that Kwon had sent 9 billion won, equaling USD $7 million, to law firm Kim & Chang prior to the collapse of TerraUSD.

On 11 May 2023, Kwon pleaded not guilty to a charge of using a forged Costa Rican passport to travel through the Montenegro airport where he was arrested. On 19 June 2023, Kwon and Terraform Labs' former finance officer Han Chang-joon were sentenced to four months' imprisonment by a Montenegrin court for using forged passports. Kwon appealed the court ruling, but lost the appeal in Montenegro's highest court.

In November 2023, the Montenegro High Court approved Do Kwon's extradition to South Korea or the United States. The final decision to extradite him to South Korea was made by the Montenegro Minister of Justice.

On 11 January 2024, Do Kwon's lawyers asked for the SEC v. Terraform Labs trial be delayed to mid-March 2024 so that Do Kwon could be extradited to the US and attend, which the SEC agreed to. On 21 January, Terraform Labs declared Chapter 11 bankruptcy in the United States, listing assets and liabilities in the range of $100–500 million. In February 2024, his former finance officer was ordered extradited from Montenegro to South Korea.

On 5 March 2024, the Court of Appeals of Montenegro overturned the lower court decision to extradite Kwon to the United States, ordering it to repeat the process to determine if Kwon should be extradited to the United States or to South Korea.

On 12 August 2024, the Supreme Court of Montenegro postponed the extradition of Do Kwon to South Korea. That decision followed a request from the Supreme State Prosecutor's Office, and delayed earlier rulings by the both High Court in Podgorica and the Court of Appeal. On 18 October 2024, the Constitutional Court of Montenegro temporarily suspended the extradition of Kwon pending its review of his appeal. The pause overrode the Supreme Court's earlier decision to authorize the justice minister to extradite Kwon.

In December 2024, another Supreme Court ruling gave the justice minister the final say, and Kwon consented to extradition to either the United States or South Korea. Based on the preponderance of the legal criteria for extradition, the justice minister, Bojan Bozovic ordered Kwon's deportation to the former. Do Kwon was extradited on 31 December 2024.

In August 2025, Do Kwon pleaded guilty on two fraud charges, and agreed to forfeit US$19 million as part of a plea deal. Sentencing was scheduled for December, with the US government to argue for a sentence of no more than 12 years. On December 11, he was sentenced to 15 years in prison. It was reported that if extradited to South Korea, he might face a second trial and jail sentence. It was "widely expected" that after serving half of his sentence in the US, he may apply for the International Prisoner Transfer Program to move back to South Korea.

=== Other allegations ===
According to the South Korean special prosecution office, Kwon was found to have withdrawn approximately $35 million worth of cash even after having been arrested in Montenegro.

In June 2023, documents and data on Kwon's confiscated laptop, including a letter by Kwon himself, were revealed to contain information showing that he allegedly backed Milojko Spajić, the former minister of finance and social welfare in the Government of Montenegro and the current Montenegrin prime ministerial candidate of the opposition party, Europe Now (PES), with funds for the upcoming election. Kwon and his lawyers later denied the allegations.

== Personal life ==
Announcing her birth in April 2022 on social media, Kwon named his daughter Luna, writing: "My dearest creation named after my greatest invention."

On 12 May 2022, an individual investor, who claimed to have lost approximately $2 million, allegedly trespassed into Kwon's high-rise condominium building to demand an apology. As a result, Kwon's wife filed and requested emergency police protection, and South Korean police began investigating the incident.

In October 2022, during an interview with Unchained Podcast, Kwon was asked about the invalidation of his South Korean passport by the South Korean government, to which he responded: "Oh, I'm not using it anyway, so it doesn't, I can't see how that makes a difference to me." When asked if he had another passport, Kwon said he wasn't comfortable answering questions related to that or his travel plans. In 2023, Kwon said that he held a legitimate passport from Costa Rica.

== Recognition ==
- 2019: Named in Forbes 30 Under 30 – Asia – Finance & Venture Capital
