= Muk-dong =

Coordinates: 37°15′N 127°06′E

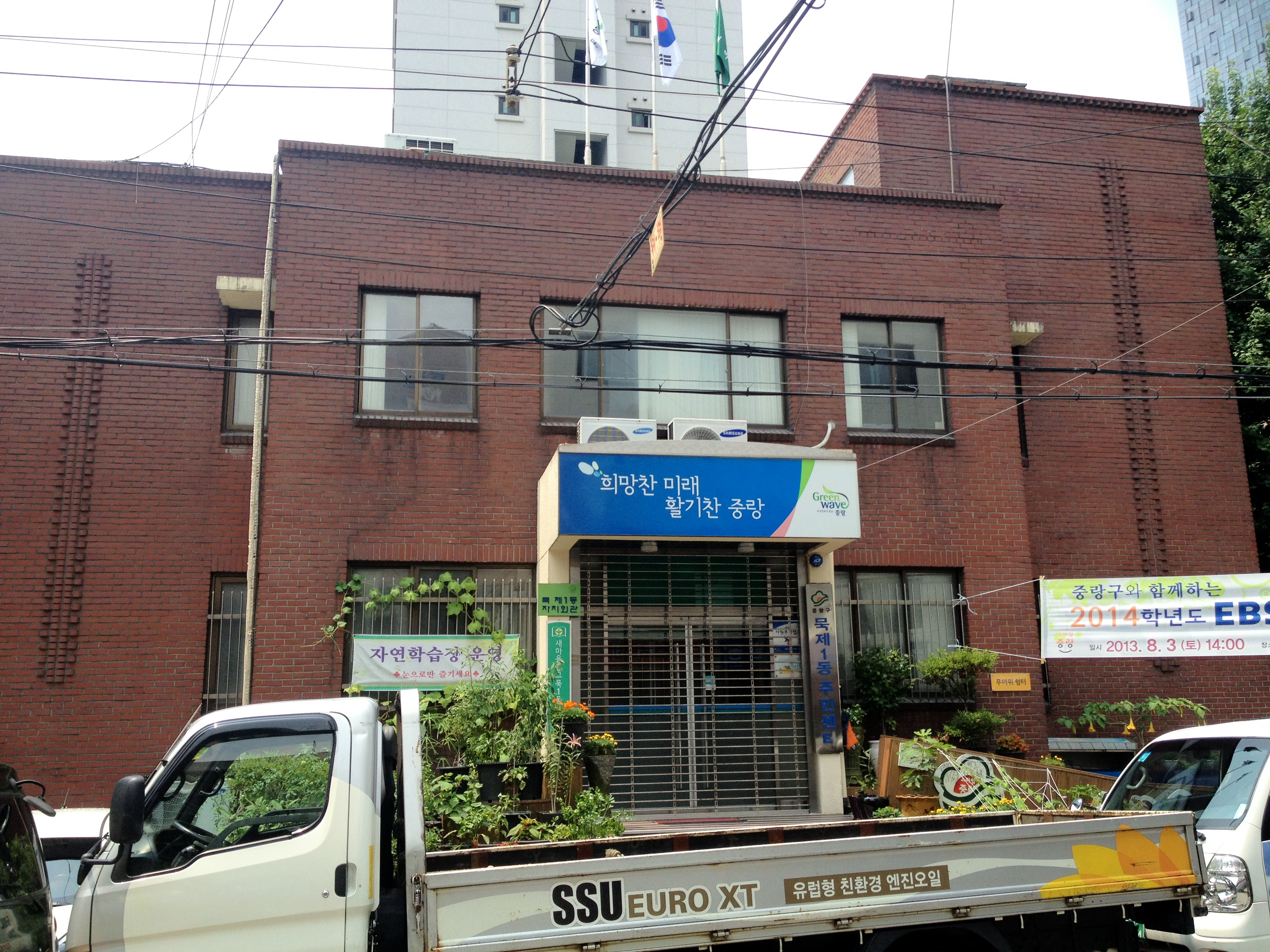
- Muk 1-dong Community Service Center (Jungnang District)
- Interactive map of Muk-dong
- Country: South Korea

Area
  - Total: 1.90 km^{2} (0.73 sq mi)

Population (2001)
  - Total: 54,666
  - Density: 28,800/km^{2} (74,500/sq mi)

Korean name
- Hangul: 묵동
- Hanja: 墨洞
- RR: Muk-dong
- MR: Muk-tong

Muk-dong (Korean: 묵동) is a dong (neighbourhood) of Jungnang District, Seoul, South Korea.

== See also ==
- Administrative divisions of South Korea
