= Sinnae-dong =

- Country: South Korea

Area
  - Total: 3.52 km^{2} (1.36 sq mi)

Population (2001)
  - Total: 59,960
  - Density: 17,000/km^{2} (44,100/sq mi)

Korean name
- Hangul: 신내동
- Hanja: 新內洞
- RR: Sinnae-dong
- MR: Sinnae-dong

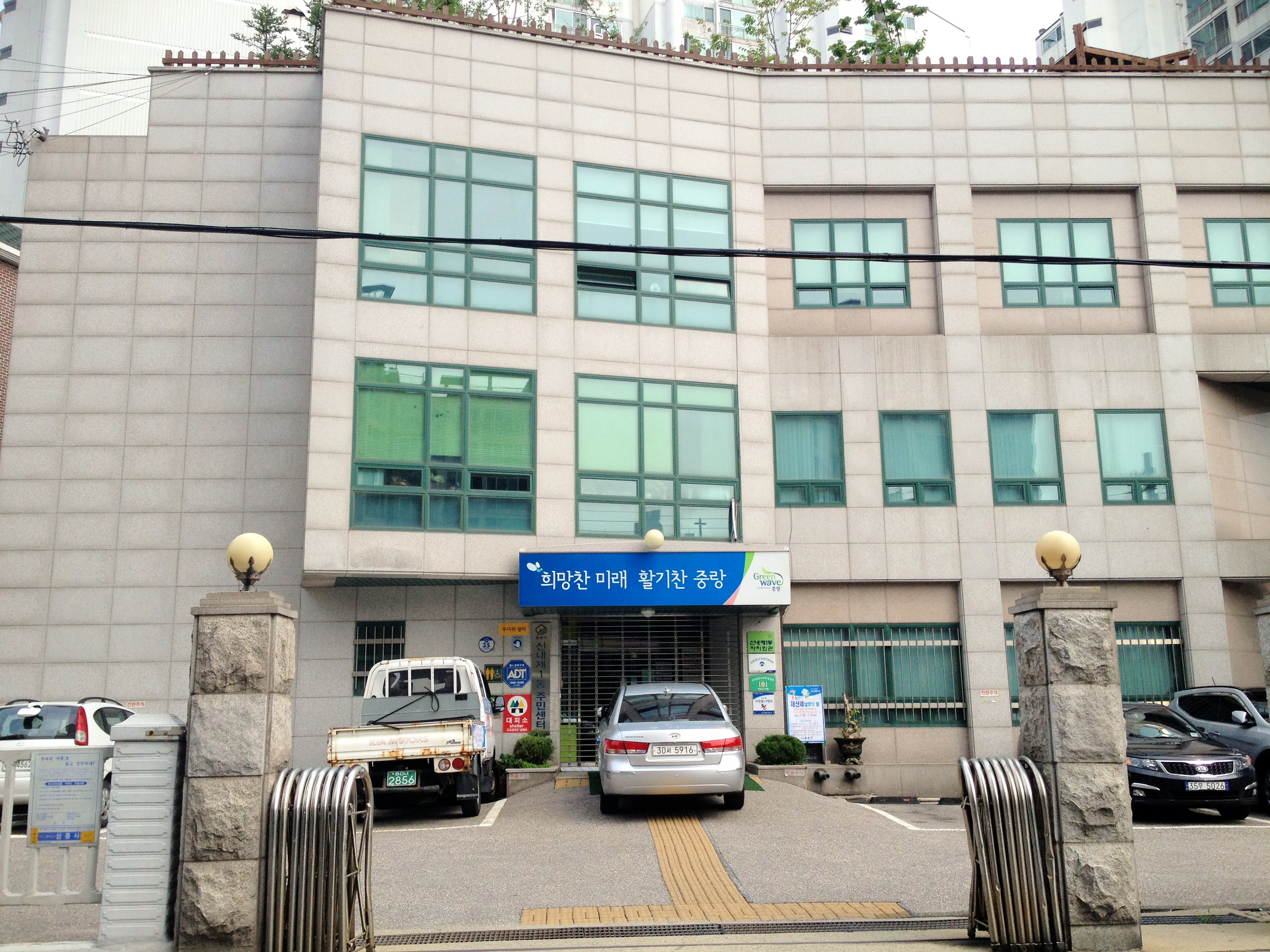
The entrance to Sinnae-dong Community Service Centre

Sinnae-dong (Korean: 신내동) is a dong (neighbourhood) of Jungnang District, Seoul, South Korea.

== See also ==
- Administrative divisions of South Korea
