= Long Blockchain Corp. =

American beverage company

- Formerly: Long Island Iced Tea Corp.
- Type: Public
- Traded as: OTC Pink No Information: LBCC (Securities registration revoked February 19, 2021); Nasdaq: LTEA
- Industry: Food, blockchain
- Headquarters: Hicksville, New York, United States
- Key people: Bill Hayde (chairman)
- Revenue: ▼$4,434,465 (2017)
- Net income: ▼ ($15,215,659) (2017)
- Total assets: ▼$3,235,121 (2017)
- Number of employees: ▲25 (2017)

Long Blockchain Corp., formerly known as Long Island Iced Tea Corp., is an American corporation based in Farmingdale, Long Island, New York. Its wholly owned subsidiary Long Island Brand Beverages, LLC produced ready-to-drink iced tea and lemonade under the "Long Island" brand. The company's first product was made available in 2011.

In 2017, the corporation rebranded as Long Blockchain Corp. as part of a corporate shift towards "exploration of and investment in opportunities that leverage the benefits of blockchain technology" and reported they were exploring blockchain-related acquisitions. Its stock price spiked as much as 380% after the announcement.

On April 10, 2018, Long Blockchain received a letter stating that its stock would be delisted by the Nasdaq stock exchange. Its shares would subsequently be eligible for trades over the counter. The company had by that time abandoned its plans to purchase Bitcoin mining equipment. Following the company's removal from NASDAQ, it traded over the counter.

The United States Securities and Exchange Commission (SEC) subpoenaed documents from the firm on July 10, 2018 in a move widely believed to be related to the name change. The Federal Bureau of Investigation has looked for evidence "of insider trading and securities fraud connected to Long Island Iced Tea stock." The firm stated that they were fully cooperating with the investigation.

On February 22, 2021, the SEC delisted Long Blockchain Corp's shares, saying that the company had not filed financial reports since September 30, 2018, and that it never completed its planned transition to producing blockchain technology.

In July 2021, the SEC charged three people with insider trading. The SEC alleged that the day before the 2017 announcement, the company's leading shareholder tipped off a stock broker who then tipped off his friend, who bought 35,000 shares of the stock and sold it 2 hours after the announcement for a profit of US$160,000. On September 20, 2024, the Canadian stock broker Oliver-Barret Lindsay agreed to pay a fine of US$75,000 in a no contest judgement without admitting or denying the SEC's allegations.

== See also ==
- Allbirds – shoe company that rebranded itself as AI
