= Daewon Foreign Language High School =

Private school in Seoul, South Korea

Coordinates: 37°33′49″N 127°05′20″E

Daewon Foreign Language High School 대원외국어고등학교 大元外國語高等學校
- Seoul; South Korea

Information
- Type: Private school, Day school
- Motto: Koreans Branching Around the World 세계로 뻗는 품격높은 한국인이 된다
- Established: 1984
- Principal: Young Kun Lee (이영근)
- Faculty: approx. 85
- Grades: 10-12
- Gender: Coeducational
- Enrollment: approx. 900
- Average class size: 25 students
- Student to teacher ratio: 14:1
- Campus: Urban
- Annual tuition: $5,000
- Tree: Wisteria
- Flower: Lilac
- Song: 대원이여 영원하라
- Student publication: Daewon Beacon
- Website: www.dwfl.hs.kr

Daewon Foreign Language High School (Korean: 대원외국어고등학교; Hanja: 大元外國語高等學校), sometimes Daewon FLHS or DFLHS, is a private preparatory school located in Seoul, South Korea.

Students choose one primary language as a major from Chinese, French, Japanese, Spanish, or German to study during their three years at the school. Korean and English are mandatory subjects, regardless of which focus language students choose when entering the school.

Daewon is one of the four schools run by the Daewon Education Foundation, all of which share a campus in Junggok-dong, Seoul.

The school's primary language of instruction is Korean.

== History ==
=== Origins ===
Dr. Lee Won Hee, Founder

Daewon was founded in 1984 by Dr. Lee Won Hee, then an executive director at Samsung subsidiary Cheil Jedang. Lee had submitted plans for a private foreign language school to the government in 1982, beginning construction of the prospective school's campus expecting the charter to be approved. But when the Ministry of Education rejected his proposal, Daewon Girls' High School was established to take the place of the language school. Daewon's original charter was approved the following year alongside Daeil Foreign Language High School and opened in 1984. They were the first foreign language high schools in South Korea.

== Academics ==
=== Academic tracks ===
There are two academic tracks at Daewon FLHS: the Korean Curriculum ("domestic") track and the Global Leadership Program ("international") track. Students are required to choose between the two upon application, but track transfers are permitted, though rare. In 2015, the domestic-international track ratio was approximately 20:1.

==== Korean curriculum track ====
The majority of the school's students are enrolled in the Korean curriculum track, where they prepare for entrance into Korea's top universities, such as Seoul National University, Yonsei University and Korea University. Preparation involves rigorous cramming for the CSAT examination, as well as training for the nonsul examination.

==== Global Leadership Program (GLP) ====
Daewon FLHS hosts the Global Leadership Program (GLP), a special academic block scheduling course intended to prepare students for colleges abroad. GLP courses are centered on critical and academic use of the English language, with classes such as English Literature and English Composition.

Since the first class of 2000, many GLP graduates have matriculated at US colleges and universities.

== Notable alumni ==
- Do Kwon, a cryptocurrency developer
- BIG Naughty, rapper
- Ryu So-yeon, professional golfer
