= Kim & Chang =

Law firm

- Headquarters: Seoul, South Korea
- No. of attorneys: 1,200+
- Date founded: 1973
- Founder: Young-moo Kim
- Website: kimchang.com

Kim & Chang (Korean: 김·장 법률사무소; Hanja: 金&張) is an international law firm headquartered in Seoul. Founded in 1973, it is the largest law firm in South Korea, with over 1,200 professionals and offices in Seoul, Hong Kong, Singapore, and Ho Chi Minh City. In 2016, it became the first Korean law firm to be included in the world's top 100 law firms by the American Lawyer, ranking 59th with a revenue of $686 million. In 2017, the firm posted a revenue of ₩1.01 trillion (equivalent to ₩1.21 trillion or US$848.31 million in 2025), becoming Korea's first law firm to reach a revenue milestone of 1 trillion won.

The firm employs numerous attorneys educated and licensed in the United States, Japan, China, and Europe. Approximately 20 percent of its lawyers are foreign-qualified, and it has a division of around 200 personnel devoted to Japan-related practice. In addition to attorneys, the firm employs patent attorneys, tax attorneys, economists, and industry-specific experts.

== History ==
Kim & Chang was founded by attorney Young-moo Kim in 1973. Kim had studied in the United States for several years, obtaining a Master of Comparative Law degree from the University of Chicago Law School in 1967 and a Juris Doctor degree from Harvard Law School in 1970. Based on his experience, he sought to create a Korean law firm that followed American standards of legal service, and was the first recruiter of foreign attorneys in Korea. Once Kim established the firm in January 1973, a former judge and Kim's longtime friend, Soo Kil Chang joined later that year.
