= Myeonmok-dong =

- Country: South Korea

Area
  - Total: 6.03 km^{2} (2.33 sq mi)

Population (2001)
  - Total: 180,556
  - Density: 29,900/km^{2} (77,600/sq mi)

Korean name
- Hangul: 면목동
- Hanja: 面牧洞
- RR: Myeonmok-dong
- MR: Myŏnmok-tong

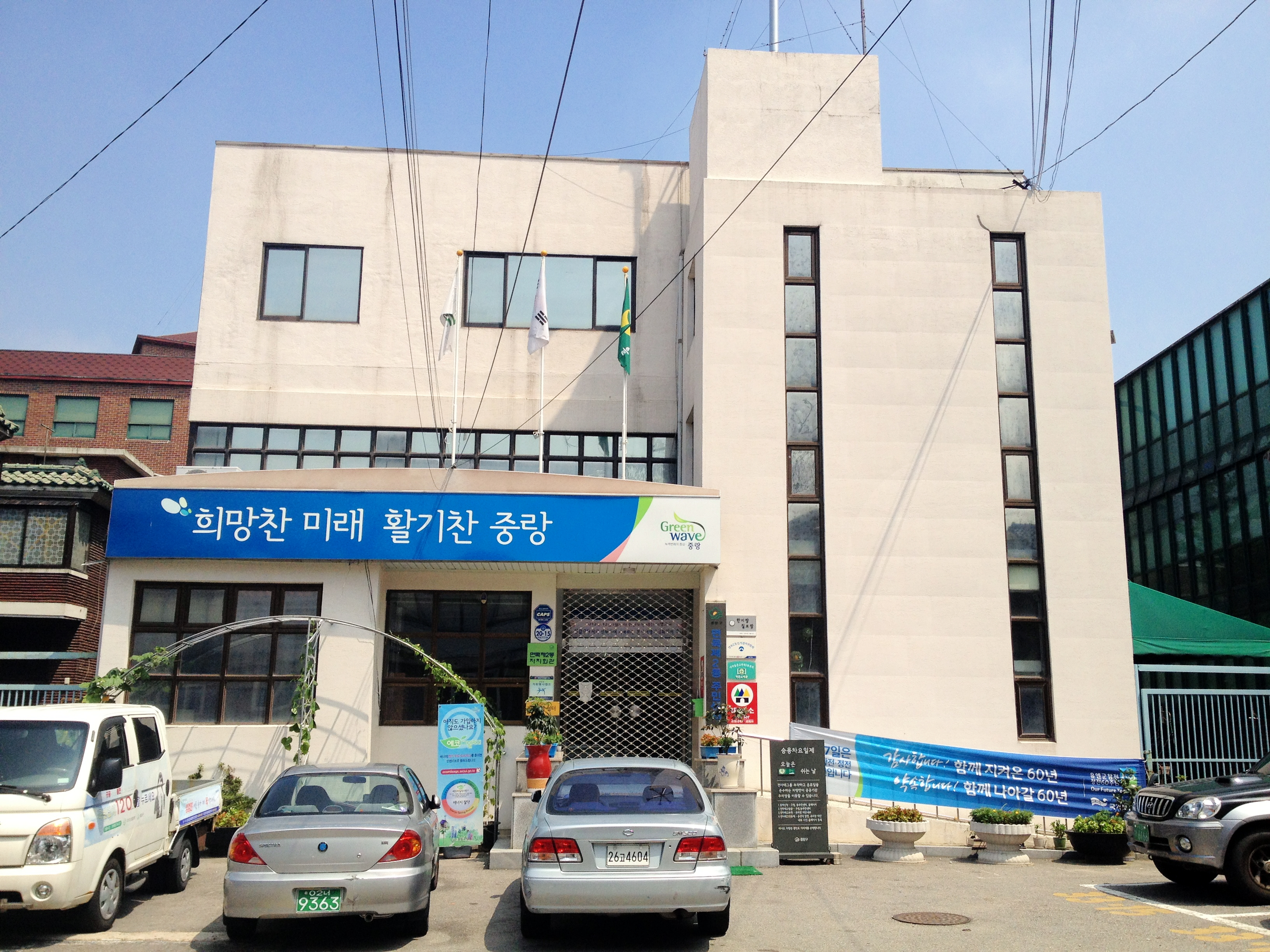
The Myeonmok-dong Community Service Center

Myeonmok-dong (Korean: 면목동) is a dong (neighbourhood) of Jungnang District, Seoul, South Korea.

== See also ==
- Administrative divisions of South Korea
