= Stablecoin =

Type of cryptocurrency that is reserve backed

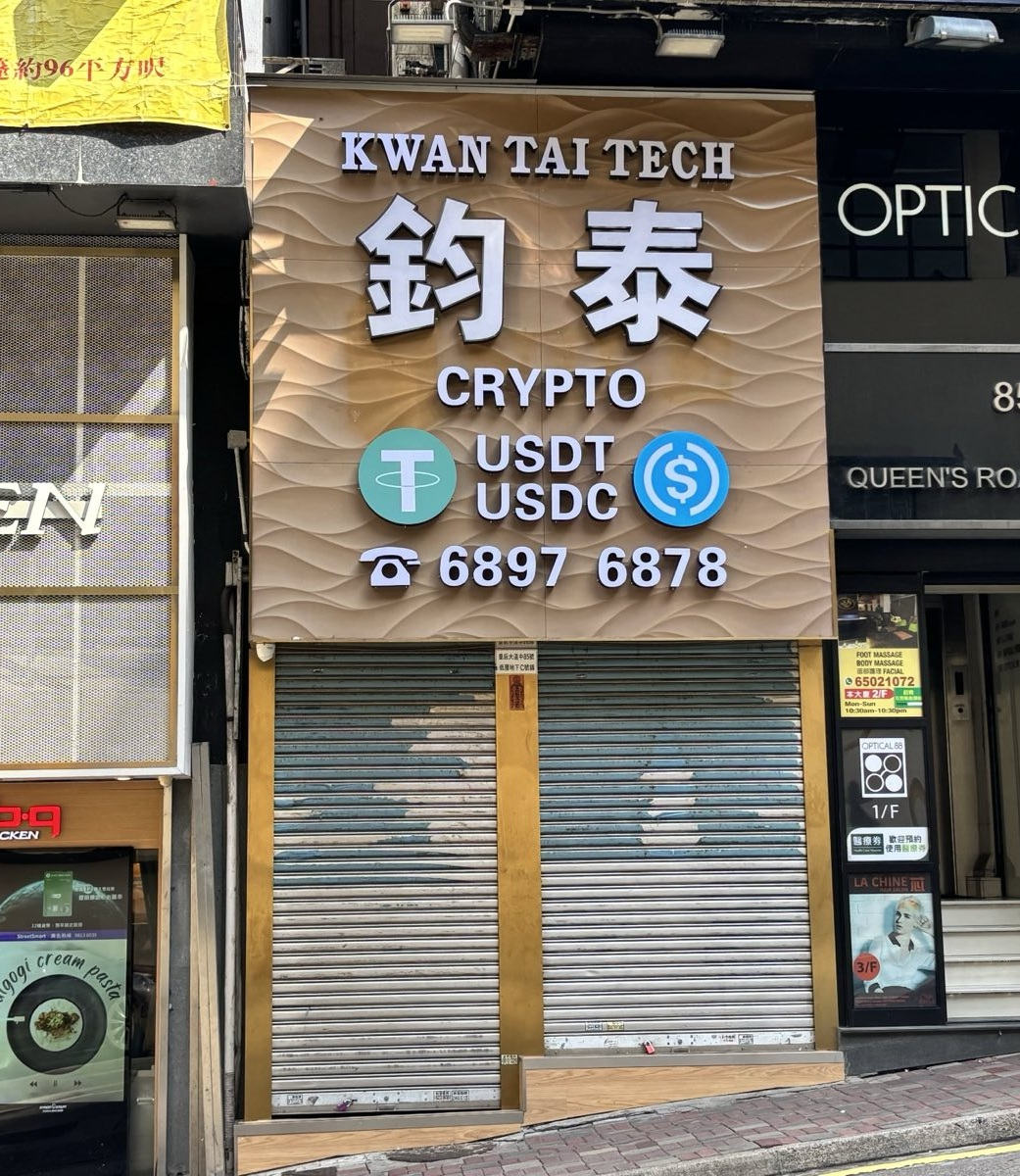
An over-the-counter stablecoin exchange in Hong Kong

A stablecoin is a type of cryptocurrency that aims to maintain a stable value relative to a specified asset, a pool or basket of assets. The specified asset might refer to fiat currency, commodity, or other cryptocurrencies. Despite the name, stablecoins are not necessarily stable. Stablecoins rely on stabilization tools such as reserve assets or algorithms that match supply and demand to try to maintain a stable value.

Historically, multiple stablecoins have failed to maintain their value relative to the underlying assets. With a growing number of market transactions involving stablecoins, their issuance and usage are increasingly regulated by governments around the world.

== Background ==
Stablecoins emerged in 2014 as a method for investors in cryptocurrencies to park their money when they invest in other highly volatile cryptocurrencies. Stablecoins are now mainly used for buying or selling cryptoassets, and for making cross-border payments. According to the Bank for International Settlements in July 2025, 90% of the market capitalization of stablecoins was either in Tether or USDC. According to the Financial Action Task Force, the market capitalization of stablecoins reached $316 billion in October 2025, while daily trading volume reached $156 billion. As of 2024, 95% of stablecoins were backed by fiat currency, of which 97% were denominated in US dollar.

== Types of stablecoin ==
Some logos of well known stablecoins: USDT, DAI, USDC, and TerraUSD

=== Fiat-backed stablecoins ===
Fiat-backed stablecoins are stablecoins that are backed by assets denominated in a fiat currency. The value of a fiat-backed stablecoin is based on the value of the backing currency, which is supposedly held by a third party custodian. The issuer defends the currency peg of the stablecoin by holding mostly fiat-denominated short-term assets, such as treasury bonds, high-quality commercial paper, repurchase agreements and bank deposits. Therefore, the structure of fiat-backed stablecoins closely resembles that of money market funds (MMFs), and they are exposed to similar risk of large-scale redemption requests causing negative contagion effects on the financial system.

As of October 2025, nearly 97% of fiat-backed stablecoins are pegged to the US dollar. Major examples of US-dollar-pegged stablecoins are Tether's USDT and Circle's USDC. For Euro-pegged stablecoins, examples include Circle's EURC, EUR Tether, and Stasis EUR.

=== Cryptocurrency-backed stablecoins ===
Cryptocurrency-backed stablecoins are stablecoins using other cryptocurrencies as collateral. The reason such stablecoins are created is that by utilizing smart contracts, they allow a decentralized network to track the price of the US dollar as closely as possible. Another use case of cryptocurrency-backed stablecoins is to convert a cryptocurrency into ERC20 compatible standard to enable trading on another blockchain.

=== Commodity-backed stablecoins ===
Commodity-backed stablecoins are stablecoins that are backed by commodities. Examples are PAX Gold and Tether Gold.

=== Algorithmic stablecoins ===
Algorithmic stablecoins, sometimes called seigniorage-style stablecoin, are stablecoins with no reserve assets or only partial reserve assets. They utilize algorithms that match supply and demand of the stablecoins to maintain a stable value. The European Central Bank suggests that algorithmic stablecoins should be treated as unbacked crypto-assets. Some major examples of algorithmic stablecoins are Celo Dollar, Tron's USDD and Kava's USDX.

== Uses of stablecoins ==
=== Trading other cryptocurrencies ===
Stablecoins provide convenience for investors in cryptocurrencies, as a simpler way to buy and sell other more volatile cryptocurrencies. Planet Money has described this use of stablecoins as similar to casino chips, as they simplify buying and selling other cryptocurrencies before eventually being traded for money.

=== Cross-border payments ===
According to a 2025 report from the International Monetary Fund (IMF), cross-border flows of stablecoin surpassed those of unbacked crypto assets in early 2022. According to the IMF, Asia and the Pacific region have the most stablecoin activity, while after adjusting for GDP, the majority of stablecoins flow from North America to other locations. The report estimated that stablecoin cross-border flow was $1.4 trillion in 2024, compared to the global cross-border payment market of approximately one quadrillion dollars. In advanced economies, cross-border flows is dominated by traditional payment systems. The largest share of stablecoins being used for cross-border transactions was among emerging markets and developing economies.

According to a study by the University of Cambridge, the most cited reason for using stablecoins in cross-border settlement is the 24/7 settlement capability, allowing transactions to take place outside banking hours. A 2025 study in the journal Telematics and Informatics, of 866 U.S.-based adults who had sent remittances within the previous year, 26% reported using stablecoins for cross-border transfers, with 34% also using other methods.

=== Currency substitution ===
According to Chainalysis, due to the volatility of the Venezuelan bolivar, some Venezuelans use US dollar-denominated stablecoins to preserve value and transact in a more stable currency. In January 2026, it was reported that US dollar-denominated stablecoins are increasingly being used in domestic transactions in Venezuela due to prolonged period of hyperinflation, sanctions, and capital controls.

A report by Standard Chartered warned that the prevalence of US dollar-denominated stablecoins could potentially cause $1 trillion from developing countries to flow to stablecoins, causing loss of bank deposits. The capital outflow would be caused by risk aversion of individuals within the developing countries against sudden sharp currency depreciation.

=== Aid distribution ===
Since 2019, Oxfam began distributing humanitarian aid to residents of Vanuatu using US dollar stablecoins. By 2022, the project registered 35,000 people in the Pacific region and has distributed aid of around $2 million to participants.

According to a report published by the United Nations Development Programme (UNDP) in January 2026, the UNDP is running pilot programmes involving stablecoins in Columbia, Syria, Gambia, Papua New Guinea, Kazakhstan, and Morocco. For example, in Syria, the UNDP Cash-for-Work programmes experienced difficulty delivering stipends to Syrians due to lack of financial infrastructure, and so the UNDP is experimenting with sending stablecoins to the beneficiaries instead.

According to media report in 2021, Portuguese nonprofit ImpactMarket reported distributing over $1 million in Celo Dollar stablecoins to more than 18,000 beneficiaries in 102 locations in Africa, and said some local merchants had begun accepting the tokens for payments.

== Policy and regulatory issues ==
=== Money laundering and terrorism financing ===
In January 2024, the United Nations Office on Drugs and Crime (UNODC) reported that stablecoins, particularly USDT, had become the cryptocurrency of choice for organized crime groups engaged in cyberfraud and money laundering in East and Southeast Asia.

Reuters reported in 2023 that groups designated as terrorist organizations by Israel, the United States and other countries were using stablecoins on the Tron blockchain instead of more volatile bitcoin tokens to preserve the value of transferred funds.

The intergovernmental Financial Action Task Force (FATF) has reported that stablecoins are increasingly used for illicit financial activity, including money laundering, terrorism financing, sanctions evasion, and proliferation financing. The report states that stablecoins such as USDT (Tether) and USDC (Circle) provide a relatively stable medium for moving proceeds compared with more volatile cryptocurrencies, and that their liquidity, interoperability, and ease of cross-border transfer make them attractive for illicit use.

=== Erosion of monetary sovereignty ===
After the passing of the GENIUS Act by the Trump administration in the United States, Jürgen Schaaf, adviser to the European Central Bank (ECB) wrote that widespread adoption of US dollar stablecoins could erode European monetary sovereignty and financial stability. Scholars in China and Singapore have both described the GENIUS Act as a strategic move to increase demand for US Treasuries and therefore an attempt to consolidate the hegemony of the US dollar. Lesetja Kganyago, Governor of South African Reserve Bank, expressed that US dollar stablecoins are being used to undermine African currencies, and is concerned that some African countries might lose their monetary sovereignty. Agnès Bénassy-Quéré, Deputy Governor of the Banque de France, and François Villeroy de Galhau, Governor of the Banque de France, warned that Europe's monetary sovereignty is threatened by US dollar-denominated stablecoins.

In March 2026, a research published by the ECB examined the effect of foreign-currency-denominated stablecoins on the monetary sovereignty of Europe. The adoption of US dollar-denominated stablecoins would import foreign monetary policies into Europe, weakening the ability of central banks to affect short-term interest rates, complicate liquidity management within the banking system, and increase exchange-rate-related volatility in funding flows. In extreme cases, it could make Europe's own monetary policy tools ineffective.

=== Sanction avoidance ===
In response to sanctions against Russian entities, A7A5, a rouble-pegged stablecoin, was launched by Promsvyazbank and Moldovan oligarch Ilan Shor. The stablecoin was used by Russian businesses to conduct cross-border payments and by the Russian state to carry out an influence campaign.

In October 2025, the UN's Multilateral Sanctions Monitoring Team found that North Korea avoided sanctions by using stablecoin for sale and transfer of military equipment and raw materials. The report alleged that North Korean officials sold military-grade satellite communications systems to a buyer in Laos and a portable air defense system to a buyer in Sudan. In both cases the buyers paid in USDT. In January 2026, it was reported that the Central Bank of Iran is accumulating stablecoins while facing sanctions against the Iranian regime.

In November 2025, the Australian government published an advisory note saying that terrorist group ISIL prefers using USDT for fundraising and to circumvent sanctions.

== Financial risks and stability concerns ==
=== De-pegging risk ===
While stablecoins aim to maintain the peg with underlying assets, they are constantly traded on the market and therefore subject to market volatility. A stablecoin can deviate from the peg due to a number of reasons, such as liquidity stress, increase in market demand, mismanagement of reserves, fluctuations in prices of other cryptocurrencies, design flaws of stabilization mechanic, etc.

=== Contagion risk on financial market ===
Since fiat-backed stablecoins are structurally similar to money market funds, they pose similar contagion risk, in which a large amount of redemption caused the selling of underlying assets, further pushing down the price of the underlying assets and creating more demand for redemption.

Partner banks of stablecoin issuers would also face substantial increase in liquidity risk exposure due to linkage with fiat-backed stablecoins. Unlike money market funds, stablecoins are designed to be settlement instruments, and therefore may face more rapid conversion, resulting in increased liquidity risk.

=== Counterparty risk ===
Reserve-backed stablecoins require a third party custodian to hold the reserve assets to maintain price stability. The concentration of reserve deposits creates a counterparty risk in which the custodian may fail in the case of a bank run. In March 2023, the price of Circle's USDC de-pegged temporarily during the banking crisis in the United States in which Signature Bank, Silvergate Bank, and Silicon Valley Bank collapsed.

=== Solvency risk ===
Fiat-backed stablecoins maintain the peg with underlying currency by using reserve assets such as US Treasuries. Since the value of Treasuries are affected by interest rate, it is possible for stablecoins to become insolvent when interest rate increase. Some stablecoin issuers mitigate this risk by allocating the majority of their backing asset into short duration securities which are less affected by interest rate.

=== Technology risk ===
In an analysis on IMF's Finance & Development, Professor Hélène Rey wrote that advancement in quantum computing is often ignored in the discussion of stablecoins. Quantum computers in the near future may be able to break public-key cryptography, allowing hackers to attack the currency networks used by stablecoins, potentially causing financial crises.

A research by the Massachusetts Institute of Technology pointed out that flaws in the logic of smart contracts could potentially result in stablecoin issuers losing control of the supply of stablecoins and their network. Cross-chain bridges are another attack vector which can cause deposit and redemption issues.

=== Lack of reserve transparency ===
Tether's USDT is currently the world's largest market capitalization stablecoin. Tether initially claimed their stablecoin is fully backed by fiat currency. However, in October 2021, it failed to produce audits for reserves used to collateralize the quantity of minted USDT stablecoin. Tether were fined $41 million by the Commodity Futures Trading Commission (CFTC) for deceiving consumers. The CFTC found that Tether only had enough fiat reserves to guarantee their stablecoin for 27.6% of the time during 2016 to 2018. Since then, Tether began issuing assurance reports on USDT backing, although some speculation persists regarding the use of Chinese commercial paper for reserves. As of November 2026, Tether has still never once completed an audit by an accounting firm.

=== Fragmentation of liquidity ===
Hyun-Song Shin, governor of the Bank of Korea, wrote in his research that since stablecoins on different blockchains are not interoperable, they create a fragmented ecosystem as compared to fiat money, which has the advantage of network effect. The requirement of "gas fee" for transactions, and the increase in fee when traffic is high, creates a dilemma in which users are incentivized to switch to blockchains with lower fees, ensuring that the ecosystem is fragmented.

=== "Death spiral" of algorithmic stablecoin ===
Algorithmic stablecoins are vulnerable to a de-pegging process known as "death spiral", in which an external event, such as the tightening of global liquidity, led to heavy redemption of the stablecoin. This triggered the minting of the linked token to burn the stablecoin, causing the supply of the linked token to increase exponentially, further causing a decrease in price.

A famous case of death spiral is the TerraUSD (UST), which was created by Terraform Labs founded by Do Kwon. TerraUSD was meant to maintain a 1:1 peg with the United States dollar. Instead of being backed by dollars, UST was designed to keep its peg by linking it with another Terra network token, LUNA. The mechanism worked by providing an economic incentive for arbitrage. If UST lost its peg and traded below $1, an arbitrager could purchase it on the secondary market and redeem it for $1 worth of LUNA. Correspondingly, if UST traded higher than $1, market actors could mint new UST by locking in $1 of LUNA and then sell the new UST on the market for a profit. However, this mechanism assumes there is sufficient market demand for UST and LUNA, making the stablecoin inherently fragile.

In May 2022, UST broke its peg with its price plunging to 10 cents, while LUNA fell to "virtually zero", down from an all-time high of $119.51. The collapse wiped out almost $45 billion of market capitalization over the course of a week.

In the case of TerraUSD, another contributing factor to its failure was its proof-of-stake mechanism. The fall in the price of LUNA caused validators to sell their stakes, allowing malign actors to become dominant validators.

== Comparison between Stablecoin and CBDC ==
A stablecoin should not be confused with a central bank digital currency (CBDC). CBDC is issued by central banks, meaning that they are a direct claim on the central bank, while stablecoin is issued by private entity.

Another difference is that CBDC, being issued by central banks, would belong to the monetary base (M0), while stablecoins issued by commercial financial institutions would belong to the monetary aggregate (M2).

The European Central Bank's digital euro project has been under consideration since 2021 but has not been legislated by the European Parliament as of August 2025. Christine Lagarde, president of European Central Bank, called it a "strategic priority" for Europe in response to US legislation of stablecoins.

== Stablecoin and interest return ==
While most stablecoins are non-interest bearing and therefore do not provide interest returns to the holder, some issuers and service providers began offering yield-bearing stablecoins in an attempt to gain market share.

The reason most stablecoins with centralized issuers do not provide interest return is because that would potentially make them financial securities, thus falling under regulatory regime. The US's GENIUS Act, Europe's MiCAR, and Hong Kong's Stablecoin Bill all explicitly prohibit the provision of yield-bearing stablecoins by regulated issuers. Australian regulator treats yield-bearing stablecoins as managed investment schemes. In February 2026, media reported that legislation in the US regarding the provision of interest was stalled due to opposition from banks.

=== Yield provided by cryptoasset service providers ===
Some cryptoasset service providers (CASPs) such as trading platforms and market makers developed products for stablecoin users to earn interests. For example, a user can buy stablecoins through a trading platform and re-lend the bought stablecoins to the platform. The platform then provides the stablecoins to institutional borrowers to earn interest. The interest is passed to the user after subtracting the platform's margin. The European Union and Hong Kong completely prohibit CASPs from offering yield on payment stablecoins, while Singapore restricted such products to institutional investors under limited conditions.

=== Yield farming in decentralized platform ===
While issuers may not directly provide interest return, decentralized financial platforms are another possible avenue for earning interests. By providing stablecoins for liquidity on decentralized platforms, holders of stablecoins can get a share of the fees paid by liquidity takers. This process is known as "yield farming".

Contrary to popular belief, yield farming is not risk free, because the holders are engaged in lending activity. In the case of the TerraUSD, initially to drive adoption, the Anchor protocol was created to offer a yield of 19.5% to depositors of the stablecoin, a rate much higher than the return on US Treasuries. Thus, a large amount of the stablecoin is locked in the Anchor protocol. Subsequently when the price of TerraUSD began to crash. The holders are unable to cash out of their position and are left holding the bag.

== Legislation and regulation ==
=== Armenia ===
The Central Bank of Armenia (CBA) has adopted the Law on Crypto Assets in 2025 to strengthen consumer protection in cryptocurrency transactions. In addition, the CBA is trying to introduce regulations on issuance of stablecoins in 2026 with assistance from the IMF.

=== Australia ===
Stablecoins in Australia are regulated by the Australian Securities and Investments Commission (ASIC). In December 2024, the ASIC published the "Information Sheet 225 Crypto-assets" (INFO 225), establishing the regulatory requirement of stablecoins under "Corporations Act 2001". Under the definition, issuers of stablecoin are treated as operating non-cash payment facilities; algorithmic stablecoins are treated as derivatives; while yield-bearing stablecoins are treated as managed investment schemes. In September and December 2025, the ASIC issued exemptions to obtain licenses for intermediaries providing services related to stablecoins and distributing stablecoins.

=== Bahrain ===
In July 2025, the Central Bank of Bahrain introduced the Stablecoin Issuance and Offering (SIO) Module. Under the regulation, stablecoin issuers can issue single currency fiat-backed stablecoins pegged to the Bahraini Dinar, US dollar, or any other fiat currency upon obtaining approval of the central bank. Algorithmic stablecoins are prohibited.

=== Canada ===
In November 2025, the Canadian government under Mark Carney announced in the Federal Budget 2025 proposed legislation to regulate the issuance of stablecoins. The legislation is expected to require issuers to maintain asset reserves, govern redemption policies, implement risk management frameworks, and protect personal information of Canadians. The Retail Payment Activities Act will also be amended to enable regulation of payment service providers using stablecoins. The proposed legislation was made in direct response to the United States' legislation of the GENIUS Act.

=== China ===
Stablecoins are considered illegal in Mainland China. The People's Bank of China, the central bank of China, also asked Chinese companies, including Ant Group and JD.com, to stop their plans to issue stablecoins in the Hong Kong Special Administrative Region in October 2025. The central bank further clarified in November 2025 that stablecoins are considered non-compliant with current regulation and asked regulatory bodies and law enforcement to crackdown on the use of stablecoins. In February 2026, the China Securities Regulatory Commission (CSRC) issued a notice banning the issuance of Renminbi-denominated stablecoins within and outside China, the reason being that currency issuance is a matter of sovereignty.

=== European Union ===
The European Union introduced the Markets in Crypto-Assets Regulation (MiCAR) in June 2023. The regulation became applicable to asset-referenced tokens and e-money tokens on 30 June 2024. MiCAR has no clear regulation on global firms issuing the same stablecoin both from an EU-regulated entity and from a third-country entity, causing concern that in that event of large scale redemption of a multi-country stablecoin, the reserves located in the EU might be quickly depleted. In September 2025, a consortium of nine European banks announced the planned launch of a MiCAR compliant stablecoin in response to the dominance of US denominated stablecoins on the market.

=== Hong Kong ===
In December 2024, Hong Kong gazetted its Stablecoins Bill. The bill was passed in May 2025. The Hong Kong Monetary Authority (HKMA), the regulatory body of stablecoins in Hong Kong, warned the public to "rein in the euphoria". In particular, guidelines require stablecoin issuers to have strict rules on anti-money laundering, risk management, and corporate governance. In April 2026, the HKMA issued stablecoin licenses to HSBC and Standard Chartered.

=== Japan ===
In June 2022, Japan's Financial Services Agency launched the Regulatory Framework for Crypto-assets and Stablecoins. The regulation requires stablecoin issuer of fiat-backed stablecoin (known as digital-money type stablecoins in Japan) to register with the agency. The agency views algorithmic stablecoin as crypto assets and does not require issuer to register. However, intermediaries such as crypto exchanges are subject to regulations. In August 2025, fintech company JPYC received approval by the agency to launch the first stablecoin pegged to the Japanese Yen, which was then launched in October 2025.

=== Kyrgyzstan ===
In November 2025, Kyrgyzstan launched the first national stablecoin, USDKG. The issuer is state-owned company Virtual Asset Issuer OJSC. The stablecoin is backed by gold and pegged to the US dollar.

=== Russia ===
In September 2025, the Central Bank of Russia approved the stablecoin A7A5 as a digital financial asset which can be used by Russian importers and exporters for cross-border settlements.

=== Singapore ===
In November 2023, the Monetary Authority of Singapore (MAS) finalized its Stablecoin Regulatory Framework after conducting public consultation since October 2022. Issuers of stablecoins are required to maintain a portfolio of reserve assets denominated in the currency of the stablecoin peg. On 16 November 2023, the regulator approved Paxos Digital and StraitsX as stablecoin issuers. In September 2026, the MAS proposed new regulation to allow multi-jurisdictional issuance of stablecoins and recognition of foreign-issued stablecoins under tighter rules, including requirement for stress testing, prohibition of interest payment, and consumer protection safeguards.

=== South Africa ===
In August 2026, the South African Reserve Bank and South Africa National Treasury proposed the Crypto Assets Manual for cross-border activities, which would ban corporate cross-border stablecoin transactions, and block any incoming payments from private wallets.

=== South Korea ===
Regulations on the issuance of stablecoins in South Korea are being discussed. In February 2026, Bank of Korea, the central bank of South Korea, suggested that only licensed commercial banks should be able to issue won-denominated stablecoins to alleviate concerns regarding money laundering and financial stability. However, the Financial Services Commission (FSC) suggested a more open approach on the participation of technology firms, arguing that a rigid approach would hinder innovation.

=== Taiwan ===
In June 2026, the Taiwan's Legislative Yuan passed the Virtual Asset Service Act, which provides a framework for regulating all virtual assets including stablecoin. The law requires stablecoin issuers to maintain full reserve backing, with segregated reserve assets held in trust by domestic financial institutions. The reserve assets are protected from claims by other creditors if the issuer enters bankruptcy proceedings. Stablecoin issuers must also undergo regular audits and are prohibited from paying interest or other returns to holders.

=== United Arab Emirates ===
In June 2024, the Central Bank of the UAE established the Payment Token Services Regulations to regulate the use of stablecoins in the UAE. The regulations prohibit persons within the UAE from accepting stablecoins for the sale of goods and services except licensed payment token.In April 2025, the sovereign wealth fund of Abu Dhabi, ADQ, and the First Abu Dhabi Bank, are set to launch a stablecoin backed by dirhams. In February 2026, the central bank approved the dirham-backed stablecoin launched by the First Abu Dhabi Bank.

=== United Kingdom ===
In October 2025, Andrew Bailey, governor of the Bank of England, announced that the Bank of England will publish a consultation paper on the UK's stablecoin regulation. The regulation is set to apply to stablecoins used for day-to-day payments and those used for settling tokenized financial transaction. Bailey is known to be a skeptic of stablecoin and once said stablecoins risked pulling money out of the banking system. The comments by Bailey drawn criticism from stablecoin issuer for constraining investment in the UK. Under the proposed regulation, individuals would be subject to a limit of holding £20,000 worth of stablecoins. In February 2026, the Financial Conduct Authority, Britain's financial regulator, announced the use of a "sandbox" programme to trial stablecoin products in controlled conditions. In June 2026, lawmakers in the House of Lords called for a softer regulation on stablecoins, especially regarding the cap on the stablecoin holdings of individuals and requirement on issuers to back tokens with non-interest-bearing deposits.

=== United States ===
In July 2025, the United States passed the GENIUS Act, a bill which allows banks and other financial institutions to issue stablecoins backed by fiat currency or other high-quality collateral, such as US Treasuries. At the time of its passing, the bill was expected to generate greater demand for US Treasuries by stablecoin issuers.

==== Stablecoins and US Treasuries ====
In November 2025, Stephen Miran at the Federal Reserve Board of Governors, confirmed that stablecoins are already increasing demand for US Treasuries, and are "contributing to the dollar's dominance". This would cause a decrease in the neutral rate of interest and lower borrowing cost for the US government. An estimate by the Bank for International Settlements using data from 2021 to 2025 found that demand for stablecoins lowers 3-month T-bill yields by about 2-2.5 basis points, an effect comparable to that of small-scale quantitative easing.

==== State of Wyoming ====
In March 2023, the Legislature of the State of Wyoming passed the Wyoming Stable Token Act, which established the Wyoming Stable Token Commission for the purpose of issuing stablecoin. In January 2026, the first state-backed stablecoin has been released in Wyoming.

== Defunct stablecoin projects ==
=== De-pegged stablecoins ===
- In June 2021, IRON stablecoin, which is an algorithmic stablecoin partially collateralized by USDC, de-pegged after large selling orders to its linked TITAN token.
- In May 2022, Terra's stablecoin UST lost its peg with the US dollar. The subsequent failure of Terraform Labs resulted in the loss of nearly $40 billion invested in UST and LUNA tokens. Terraform Labs filed for bankruptcy in January 2024. In December 2024, Do Kwon was extradited to the United States and subsequently charged with fraud. Do Kwon pleaded guilty in August 2025.

=== Abandoned stablecoin projects ===
- In December 2018, Basis, an algorithmic stablecoin which previously raised $133 million from venture capital, has to shut down due to concerns about US regulation.
- In February 2022, stablecoin project Diem was abandoned by Meta and later purchased by Silvergate Capital, which filed for bankruptcy in September 2024.
- In January 2024, the National Australia Bank (not to be confused with the Reserve Bank of Australia) announced that it would end its Australian Dollar fiat-backed stablecoin project. The project was originally created in January 2023 and aim to streamline cross-border transactions and trading carbon credits.
