= List of Let's Eat Dinner Together episodes =

The following is a list of episodes of the South Korean TV program Let's Eat Dinner Together. As of the broadcast on 26 February 2020 (episode 164), the members and guests dined successfully with 298 families, including eight families abroad (three in Japan, three in Russia and four in Hawaii).

– Mission success: Before 20:00 (KST), a family invites the cast / guest (if any) into the house for dinner.
– Mission partially failed: Between 20:00 to 21:30, the cast / guest (if any) managed to have dinner with local resident/s in a convenience store.
– Mission completely failed.

== Episodes ==
=== 2016 ===
Episodes 1 – 11

Episode	Air date	Visited place	Special guest(s)/Team		Notes/References
Episode	Air date	Visited place	Lee Kyung-kyu with	Kang Ho-dong with	Notes/References
1	October 19, 2016	Mangwon-dong, Mapo District, Seoul	no guest		
2	October 26, 2016	Seongsu-dong, Seongdong District, Seoul	no guest		
3	November 2, 2016	Changsin-dong, Jongno District, Seoul	no guest		
4	November 9, 2016	Amsa-dong, Gangdong District, Seoul	no guest		
5	November 16, 2016	Changcheon-dong, Seodaemun District, Seoul	no guest		
6	November 23, 2016	Songwol-dong, Jung District, Incheon	no guest		
7	November 30, 2016	Cheongunhyoja-dong, Jongno District, Seoul	no guest		
8	December 7, 2016	Cheongdam-dong, Gangnam District, Seoul	no guest		
9	December 14, 2016	Choryang-dong, Dong District, Busan; Dongdaesin-dong, Seo District, Busan	no guest		
10	December 21, 2016	Itaewon-dong, Yongsan District, Seoul	Kim Se-jeong (Gugudan/I.O.I)		
11	December 28, 2016	Pyeongchang-dong, Jongno District, Seoul	Lee Soo-geun	Lee Yoon-seok	(Note: Accidental encounter with KBS's announcer Jo Hang-ri when Hodong team pressed his family's doorbell, but they left after.)

=== 2017 ===
Episodes 12 – 62

Episode	Air date	Visited place	Special guest(s)/Team		Notes/References
Episode	Air date	Visited place	Lee Kyung-kyu with (Note: Except episode 13)	Kang Ho-dong with	Notes/References
12	January 4, 2017	Dapsimni-dong, Dongdaemun District, Seoul	Leeteuk (Super Junior)	Sooyoung (Girls' Generation)	
13	January 11, 2017	Mok-dong, Yangcheon District, Seoul	Jun Hyun-moo & Han Suk-joon	Lee Kyung-kyu & Kang Ho-dong	(Note: Accidental encounter with Cross Gene's Shin on road and have a short talk with him.)
14	January 18, 2017	Bongcheon-dong, Gwanak District, Seoul	Seo Jang-hoon	Gyeongree (Nine Muses)	(Note: Due to the house's owner request, Hodong team was accepted to have dinner with him but his footage was not revealed on TV.)
15	January 25, 2017	Seorae Village, Seocho District, Seoul	Seolhyun (AOA)		(Note: Accidental encounter with Kim Soo-mi on road and have a short talk with her.)
16	February 1, 2017	Yeonhui-dong, Seodaemun District, Seoul	Kim Jong-min (Koyote)	Cheng Xiao (WJSN)	(Note: Accidental encounter with Lee Yeon-bok on road and have a short talk with him.) (Note: Accidentally press the doorbell of I.O.I's Jeon So-mi's family (she wasn't at home), Kyungkyu team had a short talk with her parents (Descendants of the Sun cameo actor Matthew Douma and his wife), then left because they have already dinner.)
17	February 8, 2017	Neung-dong, Gwangjin District, Seoul	Lee Yeon-bok	Choi Hyun-seok	
18	February 15, 2017	Yeomni-dong, Mapo District, Seoul	Yoo Byung-jae	Lee Si-young	(Note: Both two teams have forgotten to execute the "Dinner Theater" segment in this episode.)
19	February 22, 2017	Buam-dong, Jongno District, Seoul	Park Bo-young		(Note: Accidental encounter with Jung Jin-young, Daniel Lindemann, DinDin on road and have a short talk with them.)
20	March 1, 2017	Baekhyeon-dong, Bundang District, Seongnam, Gyeonggi Province	Kim Young-chul	Lee Sang-min	
21	March 8, 2017	Sangdo-dong, Dongjak District, Seoul	Kwanghee (ZE:A)	Choo Sung-hoon	
22	March 15, 2017	Bulgwang-dong, Eunpyeong District, Seoul	Lee Se-young	Hyun Woo	
23	March 22, 2017	Gahoe-dong, Jongno District, Seoul	Kim Yong-man	Hani (EXID)	
24	March 29, 2017	Ssangmun-dong, Dobong District, Seoul	Minah (Girl's Day)	Hyeri (Girl's Day)	
25	April 5, 2017	Madu-dong, Ilsandong District, Goyang, Gyeonggi Province	Yunjin Kim	Taecyeon (2PM)	
26	April 12, 2017	Jeongneung-dong, Seongbuk District, Seoul	Sung Yu-ri	Jung Yong-hwa (CNBLUE)	
27	April 19, 2017	Hannam-dong, Yongsan District, Seoul	Heechul (Super Junior)	Min Kyung-hoon (Buzz)	(Note: Hodong team encountered accidentally with Jinusean's Sean on road and had a short talk with him.) (Note: Hodong team have been unbelievably successful thanks to press the doorbell in the last seconds before 20:00, although they entered in the house at 20:09.)
28	April 26, 2017	Hyehwa-dong, Jongno District, Seoul	Lee Sun-kyun	Kim Hee-won	(Note: Accidental encounter with Lee Soon-jae and have a short talk with him.)
29	May 3, 2017	Areum-dong, Sejong	Lee Soo-kyung	Yook Sung-jae (BtoB)	
30	May 10, 2017	Majang-dong, Seongdong District, Seoul	Song Yoon-ah	Yoona (Girls' Generation)	
31	May 17, 2017	Noryangjin-dong, Dongjak District, Seoul	Kim Poong	Mihal Ashminov	
32	May 24, 2017	Junggye-dong, Nowon District, Seoul	Jang Su-won (Sechs Kies)	Eun Ji-won (Sechs Kies)	
33	May 31, 2017	Irwon-dong, Gangnam District, Seoul	Yeon Jung-hoon	Park Hae-jin	
34	June 7, 2017	Dongtan-dong, Hwaseong, Gyeonggi Province	Jeong Hyeong-don (Hyungdon and Daejun)	Mino (Winner)	
35	June 14, 2017	Naegok-dong, Seocho District, Seoul	Hwanhee (Fly to the Sky)	Gummy	
36	June 21, 2017	Hongeun-dong, Seodaemun District, Seoul	Son Na-eun (Apink)	Jung Eun-ji (Apink)	
37	June 28, 2017	Sindang-dong, Jung District, Seoul	Song Il-gook	Park Joo-mi	
38	July 5, 2017	Bongseon-dong, Nam District, Gwangju	Jang Do-yeon	Park Na-rae	(Note: Special voice appearance via phone by Hong Jin-young.)
39	July 12, 2017	Ildo-dong, Jeju City, Jeju Province	Chanyeol (Exo)	Suho (Exo)	
40	July 19, 2017	Fukutomi-cho, Naka-ku, Yokohama, Japan	no guest		
41	July 26, 2017	Shinjuku, Tokyo, Japan	Sandara Park	Lee Hong-gi (F.T. Island)	
42	August 2, 2017	Unyang-dong, Gimpo, Gyeonggi Province	Lee Hyori	Shoo (S.E.S.)	
43	August 9, 2017	Gugi-dong, Jongno District, Seoul	Yum Jung-ah	Park Hyuk-kwon	(Note: Hodong team had dinner with theater actors' couple Ho San and Yang Seo-bin (birth name Yang Young-mi)'s family.)
44	August 16, 2017	Hyoja-dong, Wansan District, Jeonju, North Jeolla Province	Kang Daniel (Wanna One)	Park Ji-hoon (Wanna One)	
45	August 23, 2017	Huam-dong, Yongsan District, Seoul	Minho (Shinee)	Kim Sun-a	
46	August 30, 2017	Hwaseo-dong, Paldal District, Suwon, Gyeonggi Province	Sunny (Girls' Generation)	Yuri (Girls' Generation)	
47	September 6, 2017	Jinbu-myeon, Pyeongchang County, Gangwon Province	K.Will	Soyou	
48	September 13, 2017	Yeonnam-dong, Mapo District, Seoul	Han Chae-young	Jin Ji-hee	(Note: Special appearance by Jang Sung-gyu.)
49	September 20, 2017	Deokpung-dong, Hanam, Gyeonggi Province	Kim Hae-sook	Kim Rae-won	
50	September 27, 2017	Samseong-dong, Gangnam District, Seoul	Jin (BTS)	Jungkook (BTS)	(Note: Accidentally press the doorbell of married actor couple Kim Seung-woo and Kim Nam-joo's family, two teams had a short talk via intercom with Kim Nam-joo, then left because she has already dinner. When being in the convenience store after mission failure, Hodong team met and talked with Kim Seung-woo.)
51	October 11, 2017 (Note: Episode 51 will not be aired on October 4 due to broadcast of film The Attorney in JTBC's Chuseok special programs; a special episode, included the highlights of the trip to Japan (episodes 40–41), was aired instead at 23:20 (KST).)	Byeoryang-dong, Gwacheon, Gyeonggi Province	Lee Seung-chul	John Park	
52	October 18, 2017	Mangwon-dong, Mapo District, Seoul	Lee Yeon-hee	Cha Tae-hyun	1st Anniversary Special
53	October 25, 2017	Baekseok-eup, Yangju, Gyeonggi Province	Changmin (TVXQ)	Yunho (TVXQ)	
54	November 1, 2017	Heukseok-dong, Dongjak District, Seoul	Kim Sung-joo	Ahn Jung-hwan	
55	November 8, 2017	Jamsil-dong, Songpa District, Seoul	Jeongyeon (Twice)	Dahyun (Twice)	
56	November 15, 2017	Cheonho-dong, Gangdong District, Seoul	Lee Deok-hwa	Yang Se-hyung	
57	November 22, 2017	Yangjae-dong, Seocho District, Seoul	Irene (Red Velvet)	Joy (Red Velvet)	
58	November 29, 2017	Songdo-dong, Yeonsu District, Incheon	Jang Hee-jin	Chae Jung-an	
59	December 6, 2017	Sangsu-dong, Mapo District, Seoul	Lee Juck	Zion.T	
60	December 13, 2017	Bangbae-dong, Seocho District, Seoul	Jung Jae-hyung	Uhm Jung-hwa	
61	December 20, 2017	Hwangnam-dong, Gyeongju, North Gyeongsang Province	Kim Ah-joong	Han Hye-yeon	
62	December 27, 2017	Suseo-dong, Gangnam District, Seoul	Junho (2PM)	Ahn Nae-sang	

Remark

- On August 9, 2017, SHINee's Onew and Han Ye-ri completed the recording for this show somewhere in Seoul to promote their new drama Age of Youth 2, and the episode is just waiting for the airing time. However, due to Onew's controversy of sexual harassment on August 12, 2017 and the pressure from public after, he decided to leave the drama and the production team of this show decided to indefinitely postpone their episode's broadcast.

=== 2018 ===
Episodes 63 – 110

Episode	Air date	Visited place	Special guest(s)/Team		Notes/References
Episode	Air date	Visited place	Lee Kyung-kyu with	Kang Ho-dong with	Notes/References
63	January 3, 2018	Sindaebang-dong, Dongjak District, Seoul	Lee Soo-geun	Kim Byung-man	New Year Special
64	January 10, 2018	Siksa-dong, Ilsandong District, Goyang, Gyeonggi Province	Kim Ji-hoon	Seo Min-jung	(Note: Special appearance by Seo Min-jung's husband.)
65	January 17, 2018	Junggok-dong, Gwangjin District, Seoul	Ji Hyun-woo	Seohyun (Girls' Generation)	
66	January 24, 2018	Gung-dong, Guro District, Seoul	Ji Jin-hee	Kim Nam-joo	
67	January 31, 2018	Seongbuk-dong, Seongbuk District, Seoul	Im Soo-hyang	Uee	
68	February 7, 2018	Sadang-dong, Dongjak District, Seoul	Hong Jin-young	Yoon Jung-soo	
69	February 14, 2018	Pil-dong, Jung District, Seoul	Shin Hyun-joon	Kim Soo-mi	
70	February 21, 2018	Sinsa-dong, Gangnam District, Seoul	Kim Yong-gun	Hwang Chi-yeul	
71	February 28, 2018	Gyoha-dong, Paju, Gyeonggi Province	Im Chang-jung	Jung Ryeo-won	(Note: Accidentally press the doorbell of actor Kim Hyo-won's family, Kyungkyu team had a short talk with him.)
72	March 7, 2018	Haebangchon, Yongsan District, Seoul	Jessi	Bae Jeong-nam	
73	March 14, 2018	Bugahyeon-dong, Seodaemun District, Seoul	Goo Hara	Shin Sung-woo	
74	March 21, 2018	Daemyeong-dong, Nam District, Daegu	Tony An (H.O.T.)	Kangta (H.O.T.)	
75	March 28, 2018	Gongneung-dong, Nowon District, Seoul	Shim Suk-hee	Choi Min-jeong	
76	April 4, 2018	Wangsimni-dong, Seongdong District, Seoul	Jang Yoon-ju	Han Hyun-min	
77	April 11, 2018	Ui-dong, Gangbuk District, Seoul	Tak Jae-hoon	Lee Hwi-jae	
78	April 18, 2018	Vladivostok, Primorsky Krai, Russia	Seungri (Big Bang)		(Note: Special appearance by Ilya Belyakov.)
79	April 25, 2018	Yuzhno-Sakhalinsk, Sakhalin Oblast, Russia	Donghae (Super Junior)	Eunhyuk (Super Junior)	
80	May 2, 2018	Gwanggyo, Gyeonggi Province	Han Eun-jung	Park Ki-woong	
81	May 9, 2018	Munjeong-dong, Songpa District, Seoul	Sung Dong-il	Lee Cheol-min	
82	May 16, 2018	Samseong-dong, Gangnam District, Seoul	Jinwoo (Winner)	Mino (Winner)	(Note: After being partially failed in the previous appearance (episode 34), Mino teamed again with Kang Ho-dong and completely failed this time. When being in the convenience store after mission failure, Hodong team met and talked with Red Velvet.)
83	May 23, 2018	Seoksa-dong, Chuncheon, Gangwon Province	Eric Nam	So Yoo-jin	
84	May 30, 2018	Jingwan-dong, Eunpyeong District, Seoul	Lee Hye-young	Park Jung-ah	(Note: Special appearances by Yoo Jae-suk and You Hee-yeol when KyuDong brothers visited the studio of Sugar Man 2 while two Yoo prepared for their program's last episode's recording.)
85	June 6, 2018	U-dong, Haeundae District, Busan	Yubin	Heize	
86	June 20, 2018	Hannam-dong, Yongsan District, Seoul	Haha	Yoo Byung-jae	
87	July 4, 2018	Jak-dong, Ojeong-gu, Bucheon, Gyeonggi Province	Noh Sa-yeon	Lee Moo-song	
88	July 11, 2018	Chebu-dong, Jongno District, Seoul	Han Hye-jin	Hwang Gyo-ik	
89	July 18, 2018	Yeonsu-dong, Chungju, North Chungcheong Province	Yoo Min-sang	Kim Jun-hyun	
90	July 25, 2018	Jangan-dong, Dongdaemun District, Seoul	Solar (Mamamoo)	Hwasa (Mamamoo)	
91	August 1, 2018	Dongsan-dong, Samsong New Town, Goyang, Gyeonggi Province	Jang Dong-min	Yoo Se-yoon	
92	August 8, 2018	Seogyo-dong, Mapo District, Seoul	Kim Yoon-ah (Jaurim)	Yoon Do-hyun (YB)	
93	August 15, 2018	Jayang-dong, Gwangjin District, Seoul	Son Dam-bi	Jung Sang-hoon	
94	August 22, 2018	Gwanyang-dong, Dongan-gu, Anyang, Gyeonggi Province	Nichkhun (2PM)	Go Ara	
95	August 29, 2018	Gaehwa-dong, Gangseo District, Seoul	Park Sung-kwang	Moon Se-yoon	
96	September 5, 2018	Banpo-dong, Seocho District, Seoul	Jay Park	Simon Dominic	
97	September 12, 2018	Ungcheon-dong, Yeosu, South Jeolla Province	Hyolyn	Microdot	(Note: Special voice appearance via phone call by trot singer Nam Jin.)
98	September 19, 2018	Pangyo-dong, Bundang District, Seongnam, Gyeonggi Province	Crush	Lee Moon-sae	
99	October 3, 2018	Galhyeon-dong, Eunpyeong District, Seoul	Kim Bo-sung	Kim Dong-hyun	
100	October 10, 2018	Umyeon-dong, Seocho District, Seoul	Jackson (Got7)	Kim Seung-woo	
101	October 17, 2018	Oryu-dong, Guro District, Seoul	Park Kyung-lim	Yang Dong-geun	
102	October 24, 2018	Seongsu-dong, Seongdong District, Seoul	Im Soo-hyang	Mino (Winner)	2nd Anniversary Special
103	October 31, 2018	Mullae-dong, Yeongdeungpo-po, Seoul	Choiza (Dynamic Duo)	Gaeko (Dynamic Duo)	
104	November 7, 2018	Banpo-myeon, Gongju, South Chungcheong Province	Kim Sae-ron	Lee Sang-yeob	
105	November 14, 2018	Seongsan-dong, Mapo District, Seoul	Key (Shinee)	Jang Woo-hyuk (H.O.T)	
106	November 21, 2018	Dogok-dong, Gangnam District, Seoul	Henry	Cha Eun-woo (Astro)	
107	November 28, 2018	Gojan-dong, Danwon District, Ansan, Gyeonggi Province	Lee Tae-ran	Jung Joon-ho	
108	December 5, 2018	Cheongna International City, Incheon	Yoon Sung-ho & Kim In-seok	Hong Jin-kyung	
109	December 12, 2018	Gongdeok-dong, Mapo District, Seoul	Seulgi (Red Velvet)	Wendy (Red Velvet)	
110	December 19, 2018	Magok-dong, Gangseo District, Seoul	Roy Kim	Jo Bin (Norazo)	

=== 2019 ===
Episodes 111 – 157

Episode	Air date	Visited place	Special guest(s)/Team		Notes/References
Episode	Air date	Visited place	Lee Kyung-kyu with	Kang Ho-dong with	Notes/References
111	January 2, 2019	Gogi-dong, Suji District, Yongin, Gyeonggi Province	Boom	Shindong (Super Junior)	
112	January 9, 2019	East Ichon-dong, Yongsan District, Seoul	DinDin	Defconn (Hyungdon and Daejun)	
113	January 23, 2019	Nonhyeon-dong, Gangnam District, Seoul	Gray	Loco	
114	January 30, 2019	Namgajwa-dong, Seodaemun District, Seoul	Lee Yoo-ri	Seo Kyung-seok	
115	February 20, 2019	Bamil Village, Haan-dong, Gwangmyeong, Gyeonggi Province	Solbi (Typhoon)	Sung Hoon	
116	February 27, 2019	Sangdo 1-dong, Dongjak District, Seoul	Nam Gyu-ri	Oh Ji-ho	
117	March 6, 2019	Daegot-myeon, Gimpo, Gyeonggi Province	Ahn Young-mi	Lee Guk-joo	
118	March 13, 2019	Yongmun-dong, Yongsan District, Seoul	Lee Pil-mo	On Joo-wan	(Note: Accidental encounter with Kangnam on road.)
119	March 20, 2019	Gyonam-dong, Jongno District, Seoul	Kang Min-kyung (Davichi)	Hyomin (T-ara)	
120	March 27, 2019	Opo-eup, Gwangju, Gyeonggi Province	Oh Yoon-ah	Lee Hwi-hyang	
121	April 3, 2019	Cheongdam-dong, Gangnam District, Seoul	Jang Won-young (Iz One)	P.O (Block B)	(Note: Accidentally pressed the doorbells of Girls' Generation Seohyun's family and Lee Hwi-jae's homes.)
122	April 10, 2019	Myeongnyun-dong, Jongno District, Seoul	Ryu Seung-soo	Ki Eun-se	
123	April 17, 2019	Jagok-dong, Gangnam District, Seoul	Kangnam	Tae Jin-ah	(Note: Hodong team had dinner with CL's grandparents)
124	April 24, 2019	Yeouido-dong, Yeongdeungpo District, Seoul	Kim Soo-yong	Lee Seung-yoon	
125	May 8, 2019	Dasan-dong, Jung District, Seoul	Yoon Jin-yi	Park Sung-hoon	
126	May 15, 2019	Hapjeong-dong, Mapo District, Seoul	Han Hye-jin	Minhyun (NU'EST)	
127	May 22, 2019	Daehwa-dong, Ilsanseo District, Goyang, Gyeonggi Province	Kwanghee (ZE:A)	Kim Won-hee	
128	May 29, 2019	Hongje-dong, Seodaemun District, Seoul	Hong Jong-hyun	Kim So-yeon	
129	June 5, 2019	Singil-dong, Yeongdeungpo District, Seoul	Ji Sang-ryeol	Im Chae-moo	
130	June 12, 2019	Hongji-dong, Jongno District, Seoul	Sandeul (B1A4) & Lena (GWSN)	Jung Seung-hwan	
131	June 19, 2019	Jangchung-dong, Jongno District, Seoul	Lee Won-jong	Ahn Jae-mo	
132	June 26, 2019	Siheung, Gyeonggi Province	Jung So-min	Ye Ji-won	
133	July 3, 2019	Ponam-dong, Gangneung, Gangwon Province	Lee Woon-jae	Lee Gwang-yeon	
134	July 10, 2019	Pyeongchang-dong, Jongno District, Seoul	Park Myung-hoon	Choi Dae-chul	
135	July 17, 2019	Jigok-dong, Nam District, Pohang, North Gyeongsang Province	Shin Ji (Koyote)	Kim Jong-min (Koyote)	
136	July 24, 2019	Daechi-dong, Gangnam District, Seoul	Mark (NCT)	Haon	
137	July 31, 2019	Geumho-dong, Seongdong District, Seoul	Kim Hyun-sook	Jeong Bo-seok	
138	August 7, 2019	Itaewon 1-dong, Yongsan District, Seoul	Lee Man-gi	Hur Jae	
139	August 14, 2019	Wirye New Town (a part of Seoul's Songpa District and Gyeonggi Province's Seongnam, Hanam)	Jeong Jun-ha	Tei	
140	August 21, 2019	Sangam-dong, Mapo District, Seoul	Oh Hyun-kyung	Jang Sung-kyu	
141	August 28, 2019	Hopyeong-dong, Namyangju, Gyeonggi Province	Park Hae-joon	Jeon Hye-bin	
142	September 4, 2019	Nonhyeon-dong, Namdong District, Incheon	Gong Seung-yeon	Park Ho-san	
143	September 18, 2019	Apgujeong-dong, Gangnam District, Seoul	Kim Woo-seok (X1)	Kim Yo-han (X1)	
144	September 25, 2019	Songpa-dong, Songpa District, Seoul	Kim Tae-woo (g.o.d)	Son Ho-young (g.o.d)	
145	October 2, 2019	Gwangjang-dong, Gwangjin District, Seoul	Hong Hyun-hee	Baek Ji-young	
146	October 9, 2019	Suyu-dong, Gangbuk District, Seoul	Jung Man-sik	Hwang Bo-ra	
147	October 16, 2019	Dongseon-dong, Seongbuk District, Seoul	Lee Yong-jin	Lee Jin-ho	
148	October 23, 2019	Yeongjongdo, Jung District, Incheon	Park Ha-sun	So Yi-hyun	3rd Anniversary Special
149	October 30, 2019	Yonggang-dong, Mapo District, Seoul	Lee Hee-jin	Kan Mi-youn	
150	November 6, 2019	Sindun-myeon, Icheon, Gyeonggi Province	Lee Sang-min	Choi Jin-hyuk	
151	November 13, 2019	Yulhyeon-dong, Gangnam District, Seoul	Kim Kwang-kyu	Kim Seung-hyun	
152	November 20, 2019	Cheongun-dong, Jongno District, Seoul	Moon Hee-kyung	Im Soo-hyang	
153	November 27, 2019	Dongtan New Town, Hwaseong, Gyeonggi Province	Ham So-won	Lee Jin-hyuk (UP10TION)	
154	December 4, 2019	Seocho District, Seoul	Hong Yoon-hwa	Sung Si-kyung	
155	December 11, 2019	Hawaii, United States	Kim Min-jung	Kim Young-chul	
156	December 18, 2019	Hawaii, United States	Yeo Jin-goo	Yim Si-wan (ZE:A)	
157	December 25, 2019	Suwanjigu, Suwan-dong, Gwangsan District, Gwangju	Yoon Taek	Lee Seung-yoon	

Remark

- Jin Goo and Kim Byeong-ok completed the recording for this show in Hwigyeong-dong, Dongdaemun District, Seoul to promote their new drama Legal High, and the episode was set to be aired on February 13, 2019. However, due to Kim Byeong-ok's controversy of drink-driving on February 12, 2019, the production team of this show decided to cancel the broadcast of this episode and he subsequently stepped down from the drama.

=== 2020 ===
Episodes 158 – 164

Episode	Air date	Visited place	Special guest(s)/Team		Notes/References
Episode	Air date	Visited place	Lee Kyung-kyu with	Kang Ho-dong with	Notes/References
158	January 1, 2020	Hwagok-dong, Gangseo District, Seoul	Song Ga-in	Hong Ja	
159	January 8, 2020	Ahyeon New Town, Mapo District, Seoul	Lee Jang-woo	Yoo Jun-sang	
160	January 29, 2020	Seolmun-dong, Ilsandong District, Goyang, Gyeonggi Province	Taesaja (Kim Hyung-joon, Park Joon-seok)	NRG (Chun Myung-hoon, Noh Yoo-min)	
161	February 5, 2020	Yeomgok-dong, Seocho District, Seoul	Ji Suk-jin	Nam Chang-hee	
162	February 12, 2020	Yeonhui-dong, Seodaemun District, Seoul	Ryu Soo-young	In Gyo-jin	
163	February 19, 2020	Dapsimni New Town, Dongdaemun District, Seoul	Sean (Jinusean)	Lee Ji-hye	
164	February 26, 2020	Unjung-dong, Bundang District, Seongnam, Gyeonggi Province	Rowoon (SF9)	Kim Hye-yoon	
