= Sanggye-dong =

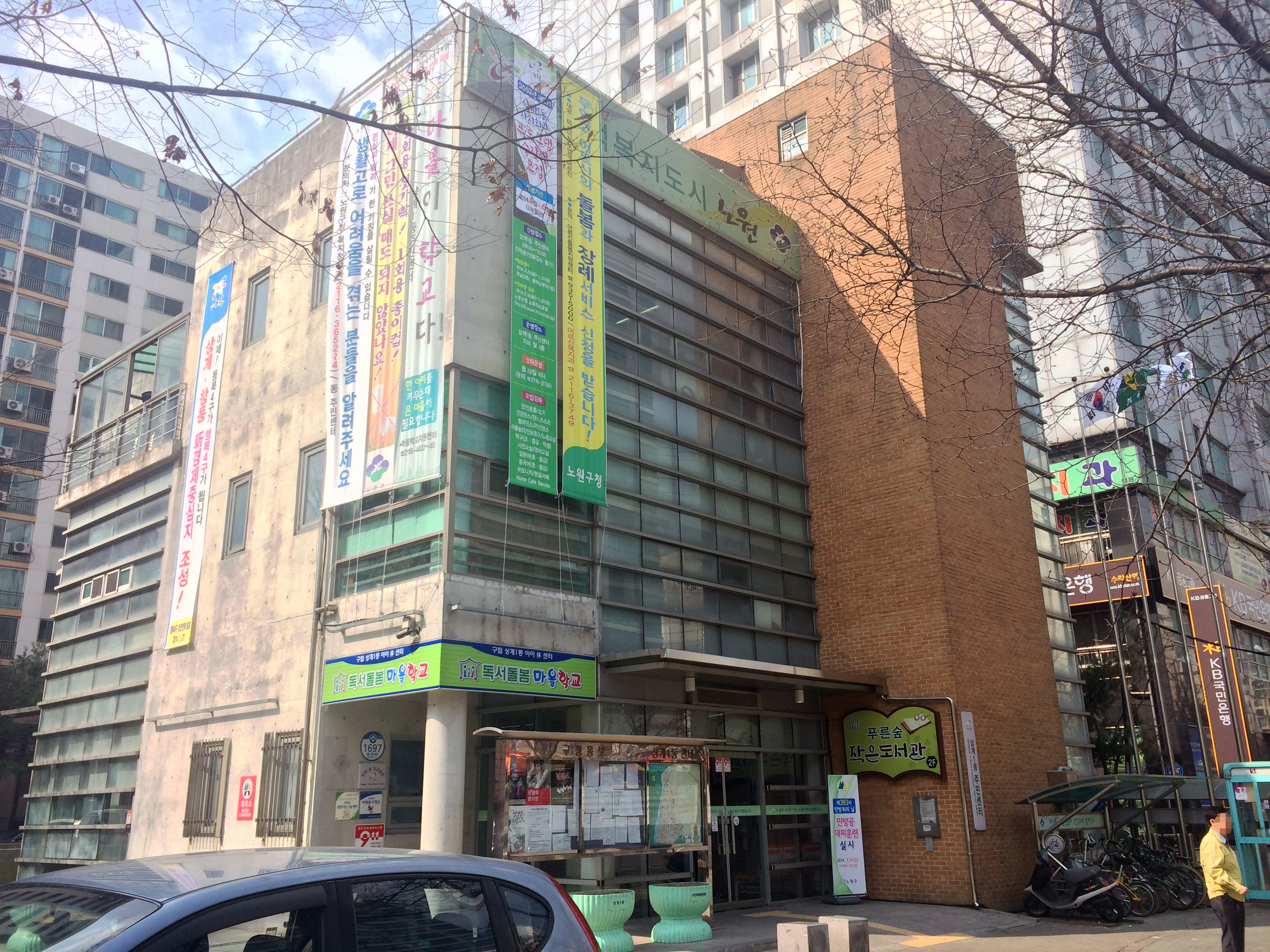
- Sanggye 1-dong Community Service Center (Nowon-gu)
- Country: South Korea

Area
  - Total: 15.68 km^{2} (6.05 sq mi)

Population (2001)
  - Total: 261,479
  - Density: 16,680/km^{2} (43,190/sq mi)

Korean name
- Hangul: 상계동
- Hanja: 上溪洞
- RR: Sanggye-dong
- MR: Sanggye-dong

Sanggye-dong (Korean: 상계동) is a dong (neighbourhood) of Nowon District, Seoul, South Korea. It was founded in the 1960s by squatters forced out from other Seoul slums. By the 1980s there were approximately 1,000 squatter households and 600 tenants. In 1985, it was declared a redevelopment zone. Most people left and some resisted before being evicted forcibly. A group of tenants had refused after discovering that the new land being offered was a "two-hour commute to and from work".

== Overview ==
The name Sanggye-dong (상계동) is believed to derive from its location in the upper valley of the Hancheon (Han Stream, now Jungnangcheon), with "Sanggye" meaning "upper stream" (上溪).

Historically, during the Joseon period, the area was part of Noeun-myeon, Yangju County, Gyeonggi Province. In 1914, several nearby villages were merged during an administrative reorganization, and the area was collectively named Sanggye due to its position in the upper reaches of the stream. The region was later divided into Sanggye-dong, Junggye-dong, and Hagye-dong.

== See also ==
- Administrative divisions of South Korea
