= List of universities and colleges in Seoul =

This is a list of universities and colleges in Seoul, South Korea.

== National universities ==
Name	Founded	Control	Enrollment	Location	Other branches
Korea National Sport University	1977	National		Songpa-gu	
Korea National University of Arts	1993	National	4,071	Seocho-gu	
Seoul National University	1946	National	28,264	Gwanak-gu (Main Campus)	Jongno-gu (Yeongeon Campus), Pyeongchang-gun (Pyeongchang Campus), Siheung-si (Siheung Campus)
Seoul National University of Education	1946	National		Seocho-gu	
Seoul National University of Science and Technology	1910	National	11,472	Nowon-gu	

== Public universities ==
Name	Founded	Control	Enrollment	Location	Other branches
University of Seoul	1918	Public	11,613	Dongdaemun-gu	

== Private universities ==
Name	Founded	Control	Enrollment	Location	Other branches
Catholic University of Korea	1855	Private	11,013	Jongo-gu	Hyehwa-dong (Songsin Campus), Banpo-dong (Songeui Campus), Bucheon-si (Songsim Campus)
Chugye University for the Arts	1974	Private		Seodaemun-gu	
Chung-Ang University	1916	Private	21,847	Dongjak-gu	Anseong-si (Da Vinci Campus)
Dongduk Women's University	1950	Private	7,500	Seongbuk-gu	
Dongguk University	1906	Private	15,502	Jung-gu	Ilsan-gu (Goyang Campus), Los Angeles (Los Angeles Campus)
Duksung Women's University	1920	Private	6,944	Dobong-gu	Dobong-gu (Ssangmundong Campus),
Ewha Womans University	1886	Private	20,330	Seodaemun-gu	
Hankuk University of Foreign Studies	1954	Private	27,351	Dongdaemun-gu	Yongin-si (Global Campus)
Hansung University	1972	Private	8,030	Seongbuk-gu	Jongno-gu (Design Campus)
Hanyang University	1939	Private	25,155	Seongdong-gu	Sangnok-gu (ERICA Campus)
Hongik University	1946	Private	21,305	Mapo-gu	Sejong-si (Sejong Campus)
Konkuk University	1931	Private	32,100	Gwangjin-gu	Chungju-si (Chungju Campus)
Kookmin University	1946	Private	14,944	Seongbuk-gu	
Korea University	1905	Private	29,445	Seongbuk-gu	Sejong-si (Sejong Campus)
Kwangwoon University	1934	Private	13,100	Nowon-gu	
Kyonggi University	1947	Private	17,000	Seodaemun-gu	Suwon-si (Main Campus)
Kyung Hee University	1911	Private	33,373	Dongdaemun-gu	Yongin-si, (Global Campus), Namyangju-si, (Gwangneung Campus)
Myongji University	1948	Private	24,648	Seodaemun-gu	Yongin-si (Natural Science Campus)
Sahmyook University	1906	Private	5,922	Nowon-gu	
Sangmyung University	1937	Private	11,873	Jongno-gu	Cheonan-si (Cheonan Campus)
Sejong University	1940	Private	20,391	Gwangjin-gu	
Seokyeong University	1947	Private	8,401	Seongbuk-gu	
Seoul Women's University	1960	Private	8,338	Nowon-gu	
Sogang University	1960	Private	15,111	Mapo-gu	
Sookmyung Women's University	1906	Private	10,492	Yongsan-gu	Yongsan-gu (Second Foundation Campus)
Soongsil University	1897	Private	16,406	Dongjak-gu	
Sungkonghoe University	1914	Private	3,537	Guro-gu	
Sungkyunkwan University	1398	Private	34,441	Jongno-gu	Suwon-si (Natural Sciences Campus)
Sungshin Women's University	1936	Private	13,000	Seongbuk-gu	
Yonsei University	1885	Private	29,832	Seodaemun-gu (Main Campus)	Songdo-si (International Campus)

== See also ==
- List of universities and colleges in South Korea
- Education in South Korea
