= Sahmyook Foods =

Seventh-day Adventist Church food company based in South Korea

- Native name: 삼육식품
- Type: Private
- Industry: Food
- Founded: 1978
- Headquarters: 320 Panjeong-ri Jiksan-eup; Chunan-si; Choongchungnam-do 330-811 South Korea
- Key people: Jin Kyu Oh CEO; Shin Kook Park (Vice President)
- Products: Soy milk Meat Substitutes; Ramen Noodles; Seaweed
- Website: http://www.sahmyook.co.kr/

The Sahmyook Foods is a Seventh-day Adventist Church food company in South Korea that produces a large range of soy milks as well as a range of vegetarian products. Sahmyook Foods owns three factories, the oldest being in Choongnam; the second being in Wanju-gun, Jeonbuk and the third being in Bonghwa-gun, Kyungbuk. Sahmyook Foods has received five management awards since 2004. 60% of Sahmyook Foods market is in the United States, while 40% of its market is in Korea.

== History ==
Sahmyook Foods was founded around 1978.

In 2011 the Fair Trade Commission fined Sahmyook Foods 1.5 billion won for price fixing. Sahmyook Foods, Dr. Chung's Food and Maeil Dairies control 82 percent of the soy milk market in South Korea.

== Products ==
Sahmyook Foods produces meat substitutes, ramen noodles, seaweed & soy milk products.

- Baby Soydrink (Infant & Toddler)
- Black Bean Walnut & Almond
- Black Sesame Soydrink
- Black bean Soydrink
- Black bean Calcium Soydrink
- Calcium Soydrink
- Flavored Soydrinks (Banana, Chocolate & Strawberry)
- Hoeny Soydrink
- Noodle (Hot Taste)
- Noodle (Vegetable)
- Original Crispy Seasnack
- Plain Soydrink
- Regular Soydrink
- Roasted Seaweed Flakes
- Roasted Seaweed Original Flavor
- Roasted Seaweed Snack Olive
- Roasted Seaweed Snack Sesame
- Roasted Seaweed Sushi Sheets
- Seaweed Flakes
- Soybean Vegetable Potato Noodle
- Soy Drink Bottle
- Spicy Vegetable Potato Noodle
- Sweet Tasty Soy Bottle
- Vegeburger
- Vegement

== See also ==
- La Loma Foods – a food manufacturer formerly owned by the Seventh-day Adventist Church
- List of vegetarian and vegan companies
- Sahmyook University
- Sahmyook Medical Center
- Sahmyook Language School
