= Loma Linda (food brand) =

US vegetarian food brand

La Loma Foods
- Formerly: Loma Linda Food Company, Loma Linda Foods
- Industry: Vegetarian and vegan food production
- Predecessor: The Sanitarium Food Company, Worthington Foods, The Kellogg Company
- Founded: 1905; 121 years ago
- Successor: Atlantic Natural Foods Company
- Headquarters: Nashville, North Carolina, United States
- Area served: United States
- Products: Meat analogue products
- Website: atlanticnaturalfoods.com/brand/loma-linda

La Loma Foods, formerly named Loma Linda Food Company and Loma Linda Foods, and with products presently branded under the name Loma Linda and Loma, is a former food manufacturing company that produced vegetarian and vegan foods. It is presently an active brand of vegetarian and vegan food products produced and purveyed by the Atlantic Natural Foods Company of Nashville, North Carolina. Loma Linda Foods began operations in 1905 under the name The Sanitarium Food Company and was owned by the Seventh-day Adventist Church until 1990.

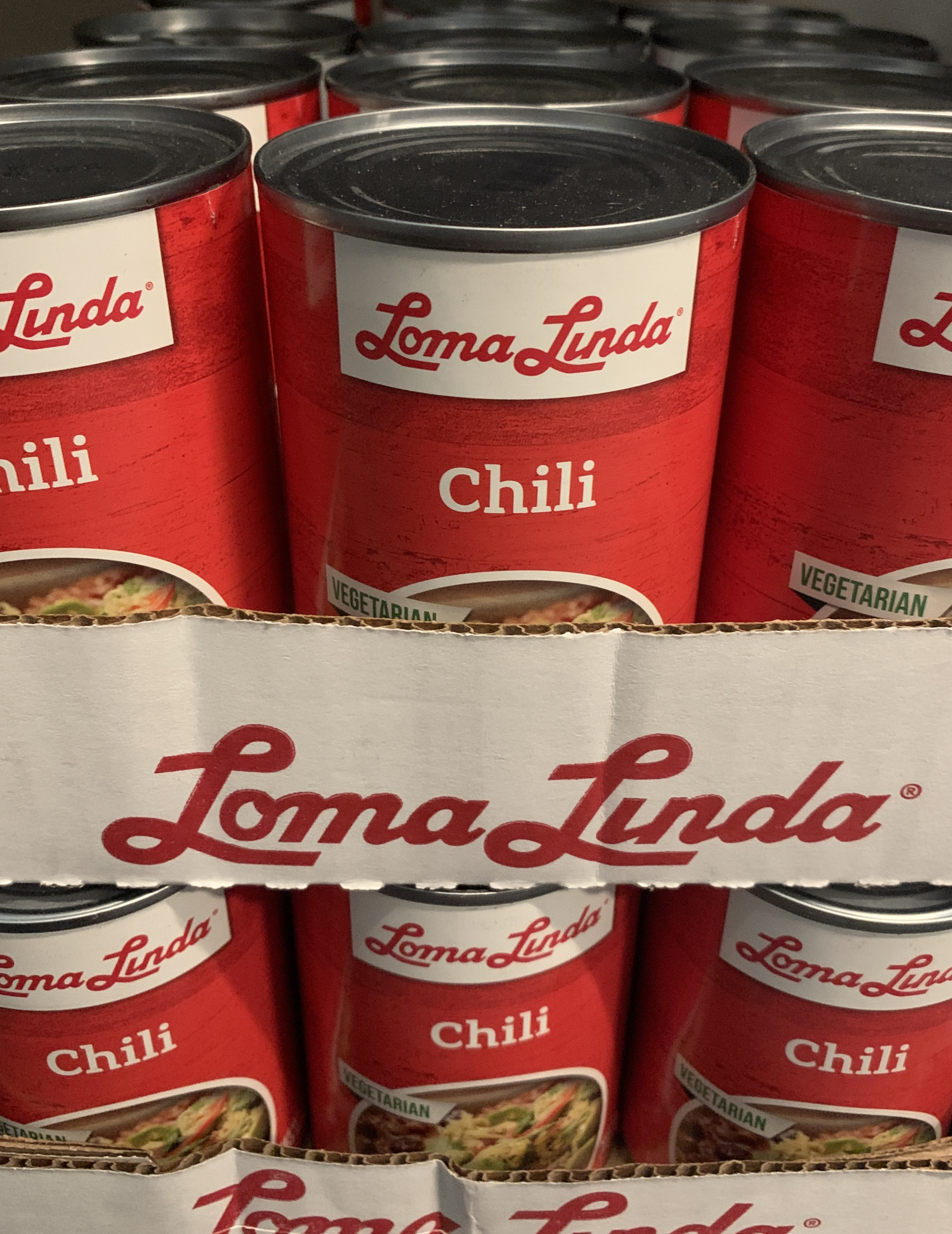
Cases of Loma Linda Chili

== Overview ==
La Loma Foods is a former food manufacturing company and brand presently owned by Atlantic Natural Foods Company, based in Nashville, North Carolina, that manufactures and sells vegetarian and vegan foods. Food products are presently branded under the name "Loma Linda" by the Atlantic Natural Foods Company. The company was previously owned by the Seventh-day Adventist Church and Worthington Foods. The company began operations in 1905 under the name The Sanitarium Food Company, and produced crackers, breads and cookies. Additional health foods were later produced by the company, such as the breakfast cereal Ruskets, and the company also expanded to produce infant formula and meat analogue products.

At the time the Loma Linda Food Company was founded in 1933, it produced some of the first meat analogue products prepared from soy and wheat that were available in the United States on a commercial basis. In the 1960s, Loma Linda Foods and Worthington Foods were the largest manufacturers of soy-based foods in the United States. Foods sold under the present Loma Linda brand name include canned vegetarian/meat analogue products such as chili, taco filling and faux meats such as sausage, chicken, tuna, scallops and steak.

== History ==
Loma Linda Foods was preceded by the Loma Linda Sanitarium bakery, officially named The Sanitarium Food Company, which began operations in 1905 in Loma Linda, California. The company under the name Loma Linda Food Company was created in 1933, at which time it opened a new production facility in La Sierra, near Riverside, California.

The company's name was changed to La Loma Foods in 1989, and in 1989 the company sold its infant formula brand and line to N.V. Nutricia, a Dutch company. The Seventh-day Adventist Church sold the company to Worthington Foods of Ohio in 1990, and Worthington Foods was acquired by The Kellogg Company in 1999. The Kellogg Company sold the company to the Atlantic Natural Foods Company in 2015.

In April 2025, Atlantic Natural Foods filed for Chapter 11 bankruptcy protection, blaming financial challenges and supply issues. In August 2025, Atlantic Natural Foods sold all of its assets to Century Pacific Food.

== Products ==
Currently, Atlantic Natural Foods labels the La Loma products which they acquired from Kellogg's as Loma Linda. Products include:

- Big Franks
- Dinner Cuts (no longer manufactured)
- Fried Chik'n
- Little Links
- Linketts
- Nuteena (no longer manufactured)
- Redi-Burger
- Swiss Stakes
- Tender Bits
- Tender Rounds
- Vege-Burger

Products that were produced by Worthington Foods and are now labeled as Loma Linda are as follows:

- Chili
- Choplets
- Diced Chik
- FriChik
- Multigrain Cutlets (no longer manufactured)
- Prime Stakes
- Saucettes
- Super Links
- Vegetarian Burger
- Vegetable Skallops
- Vegetable Steaks
- Veja-Links

== See also ==
- List of vegetarian and vegan companies
- Earth's Own Food Company - A Seventh-day Adventist food company in British Columbia, Canada
- Sahmyook Foods – A Seventh-day Adventist food company in South Korea
- Sanitarium Health and Wellbeing Company - A Seventh-day Adventist food company in Melbourne, Victoria, Australia
