= Ruskets =

Cereal product

Ruskets was a cereal product consisting of pressed biscuits of toasted wheat flakes. They were produced by Loma Linda Foods, a health food company owned by the Seventh-day Adventist Church. In 1938 the company's main product was Ruskets. A similar item, "Weet-Bix", remains popular in many countries.

== See also ==
- Shredded Wheat cereal brand
