= Gongneung-dong =

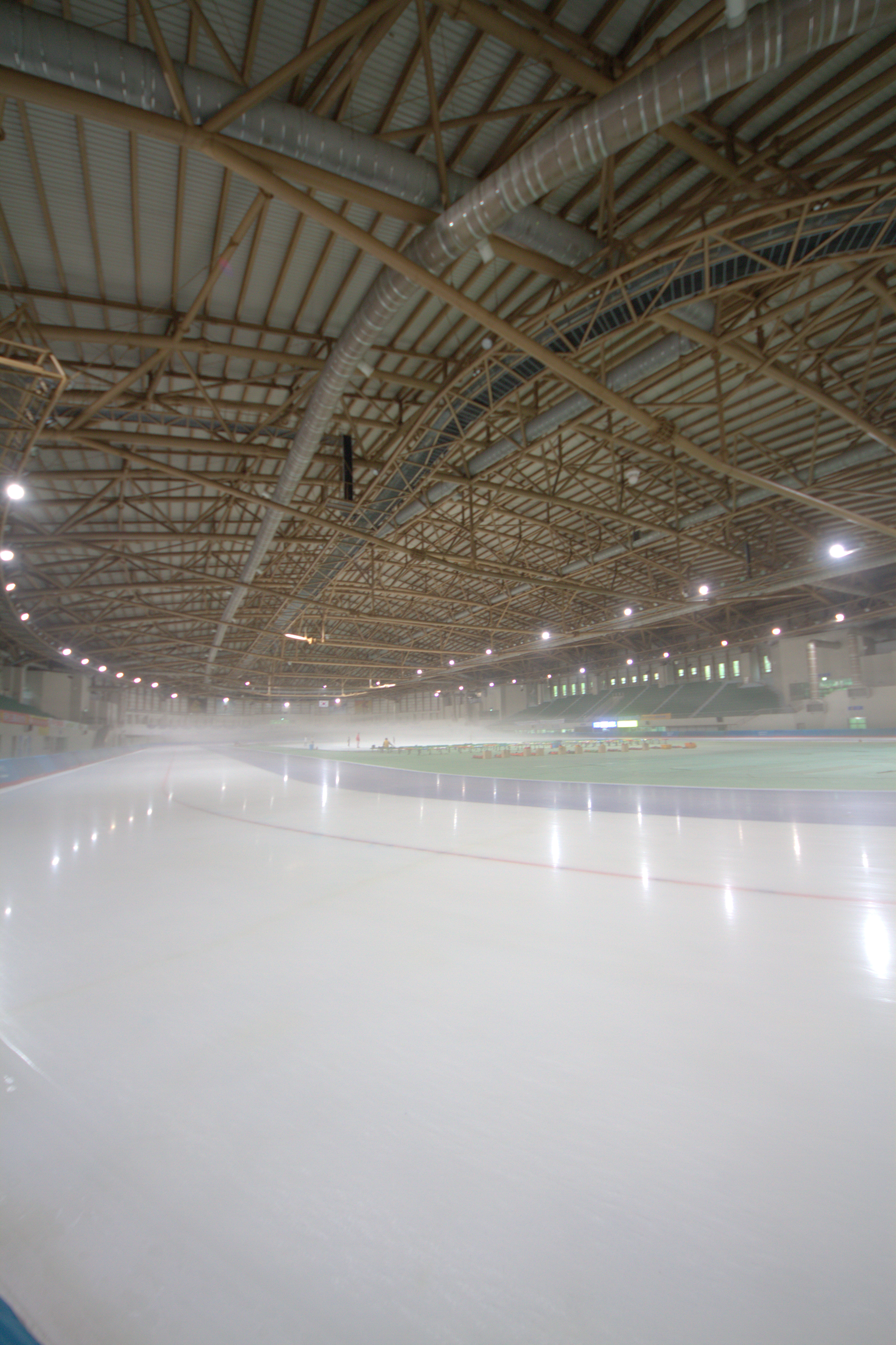
- Gongneung-dong, Nowon-gu, Seoul, South Korea
- Country: South Korea

Area
  - Total: 8.23 km^{2} (3.18 sq mi)

Population (2001)
  - Total: 81,510
  - Density: 9,900/km^{2} (25,700/sq mi)

Korean name
- Hangul: 공릉동
- Hanja: 孔陵洞
- RR: Gongneung-dong
- MR: Kongnŭng-dong

Gongneung-dong (Korean: 공릉동) is a dong (neighborhood) of Nowon District, Seoul, South Korea.

== Overview ==
The name was formed by combining "Gong" (공) from Gongdeok-ri and "Neung" (릉) from Taereung, a term also used for the surrounding area. In 1963, when Gongdeok-ri of Yangju County, Gyeonggi Province, was incorporated into Seoul, the name Taereung-dong was proposed to avoid confusion with Gongdeok-dong in Mapo-gu. Following opposition from local residents, the name was changed to Gongneung-dong in 1970.

== Notable places ==
- Seoul Women's University
- Sahmyook University
- Seoul National University of Technology
- Korea Military Academy (육군사관학교)
- Taereung National Village (태릉선수촌 泰陵選手村)
- Taereung (태릉 泰陵)
- Gangneung (강릉 康陵)
- Samgunbu Cheongheondang (삼군부청헌당 三軍府淸憲堂)

== See also ==
- Administrative divisions of South Korea
