= Sahmyook Medical Center =

Coordinates: 37°35′17″N 127°03′56″E

Sahmyook Medical Center 삼육서울병원
- Seventh-day Adventist Church

Geography
- Location: Dongdaemun-gu, Seoul, South Korea

Organisation
- Care system: Private
- Type: Teaching, General
- Affiliated university: Sahmyook University

Services
- Emergency department: Yes

History
- Founded: 1908

Links
- Website: www.symcs.co.kr
- Lists: Hospitals in South Korea

Sahmyook Medical Center (Korean: 삼육서울병원; formerly Seoul Adventist Hospital) is a non-profit hospital located in Seoul, South Korea. It admits more than 30,000 patients per year. Sahmyook Medical Center also houses the Sahmyook Children's Hospital, Proton Treatment Center, Transplantation Institute & Liver Center. It is owned and operated by the Korean Union Conference of the Seventh-day Adventist Church.

The hospital is the base for the nursing course offered by the Sahmyook University.

== See also ==
- List of Seventh-day Adventist hospitals
- List of hospitals in South Korea
- Sahmyook University
- Sahmyook Foods
- Sahmyook Language School
