= Let's Eat Dinner Together =

- Promotional poster
- Also known as: Dining Together
- Genre: Reality show; Variety show; Documentary
- Written by: Shin Yeo-jin; Kwon Kyung-hyun; Ha Kyung-hwa; Nam Eun-kyung; Yang Soo-hwa; Jo Hye-joo; Shin Yoo-jin; Yoon Da-jeong
- Starring: Lee Kyung-kyu; Kang Ho-dong
- Country of origin: South Korea
- Original language: Korean
- No. of episodes: 164 (list of episodes)

Production
- Executive producer: Yoon Hyun-joon
- Producers: Bang Hyun-young; Lee Na-ra; Chae Sung-wook; Ahn Jeong-hyun; Moon Min-jeong; Baek Soo-jin
- Running time: 100 minutes
- Production company: JTBC

Original release
- Network: JTBC, JTBC2
- Release: October 19, 2016 – February 26, 2020

Let's Eat Dinner Together (Korean: 한끼줍쇼; RR: Hankkijupsyo), also known as Dining Together, is a South Korean television program starring Lee Kyung-kyu and Kang Ho-dong. This is a documentary-like program that traces the journey of two men who have been called as "National MCs" (due to their appearances on many South Korean entertainment programs) in finding dinner. It is also the first collaboration between the duo since Kang's entry into the entertainment industry. It began airing on JTBC starting from October 19, 2016.

== Background ==
200 years ago, Kim Sat-gat wandered around Joseon and felt hungry, people were willing to share food together. 200 years later, in 2016, Kim Sat-gat is no longer alive, and the people living in the city no longer talk about the stories or the food. Instead, what makes people open their mouth are smartphones, SNS (social networking service), message boards, divination and one more thing, spoons.

People eat where, when, with whom and how; two hungry men plan on finding people who can have dinner with them. They press your doorbell, they are just curious about your dinner, let them listen to your story and let them become your family's members. Will you open the door for them?

== Format ==
There are few parts to the show and in completing the main mission, there are rules to follow.

=== Rules ===
There are no fixed rules given by production team but the cast in episode 1 had set the following rules and respected them which are as follows:

- Press the doorbell only from 18:00 (winter) or 18:30 (summer) to 20:00.
- Do not return a second time to the same house which had rejected them before.
- Do not eat anything given free by citizen on road (few exceptions exist like in episode 47, the members/guests accepted grapes).
- Do not tell any people before 18:00 that will come back later. (i.e. no pre-arranged families are allowed)
- Can insist maximum three times if people refuse. (Original on episode 1: Do not insist if people refuse)
- Go to another family if any family member is uncomfortable about the shooting.
- Do not enter a family which already had dinner.
- The above rules also apply if they discover a celebrity's residence or a celebrity as a civilian (e.g. Seohyun on ep. 121 where her family house was discovered, and her car was discovered in 2017 when she was a civilian.)

=== Introduction of location and guests ===
The hosts will start from a specific place and then proceed to the neighbourhood they are tasked to have dinner. The production team will give the hosts the mission they have to complete which usually reads: "With a spoon on hand, go to (a selected place) and request to have dinner with a family". Some additional details may be given such as on how to get to the destination (usually by walking / public transport). They may also be given clues to find their guests at a specific location. The production team will also offer the each cast member a same amount of money for travel or snacks during the day.

The cast will then proceed to find if there are any guests which will be joining them for dinner and the guest will be introduced. The guest/s are selected by the production team to join the cast as someone whom, if they rang our doorbell, we would really want to share a meal with. There are some episodes which the sequence is changed (i.e. the guests are found first and introduced and then given the mission card together with the cast members).

The cast will also give a brief introduction to the location as they move through the neighbourhood which may include introducing the beautiful sceneries, the culture and how the place got its name. Some short interviews may also be conducted with local residents to understand the neighbourhood better. In addition, the cast will usually enter a realtor office to find up more about the locality and obtain useful information such as the housing types (apartments, villas, or houses) as well as demographics which may influence the success or failure of the mission. At times, some famous personalities will be mentioned having a house in the region by the realtor also.

The cast will also recce the location and may identify some houses they will like to visit later.

=== Completion of the main mission ===
When the time for ringing bells starts, the cast will then decide how to team up for the mission. If there is no guest or only one guest is there, the members do the mission together with guest. If there are two guests, they can do the mission by team (member / guest, or member / member, or guest / guest) in the same area but with different families, or together with same family.

They will then start to ring the doorbells of households. Mission is deemed to be success if before 20:00, a family (with all members allowing) permits the cast members to go inside and have dinner with the entire family, talk and then take together a family photo which will also be presented to the families afterwards. A photo of the dinner that the cast had will also be taken as proof of mission success.

Mission is deemed to be a failure if they fail to do so. The cast will then head to a convenience store nearby to have a dinner with a local resident who is eating dinner in the store and use the rest of the money to buy their own dinner. They will still take a picture together and share lesser stories. This is deemed to be partial failure. After 21:30, if they still cannot find a resident to eat with, it will be a complete failure and the cast/guest cannot eat anything at all for the day.

Before the cast members join the dinner table of any family, there is a segment called "Dinner Theater" when the family's members will take their dinner as per their daily normal routine for around two or three minutes. After dinner, there is another segment called "Compliments and Disappointments" when the family's members tell three compliments and three disappointments about each other. In few episodes, there is also segment where video messages are sent from family members to their extended family or loved ones. At times, the cast will also provide token of appreciation to the host family. The cast will also wash the plates for the meal and share final thoughts (in the epilogue of the episode when title credits are shown).

== Ratings ==
In the table below, the blue numbers represent the lowest ratings and the red numbers represent the highest ratings.

=== 2016 ===
List of ratings in 2016 (Episodes 1 – 11)

Episode #	Broadcast Date	AGB Ratings (Nationwide)	TNMS Ratings (Nationwide)
1	October 19, 2016	2.822%	—
2	October 26, 2016	2.530%	—
3	November 2, 2016	1.957%	—
4	November 9, 2016	2.520%	—
5	November 16, 2016	2.295%	—
6	November 23, 2016	1.823%	—
7	November 30, 2016	2.214%	—
8	December 7, 2016	2.499%	3.0%
9	December 14, 2016	2.471%	2.8%
10	December 21, 2016	3.518%	3.3%
11	December 28, 2016	4.915%	3.9%

=== 2017 ===
List of ratings in 2017 (Episodes 12 – 62)

Episode #	Broadcast Date	AGB Ratings (Nationwide)	TNMS Ratings (Nationwide)
12	January 4, 2017	3.588%	2.8%
13	January 11, 2017	4.178%	3.3%
14	January 18, 2017	3.554%	3.4%
15	January 25, 2017	5.001%	4.2%
16	February 1, 2017	5.263%	4.2%
17	February 8, 2017	5.368%	4.9%
18	February 15, 2017	4.341%	3.8%
19	February 22, 2017	5.229%	4.9%
20	March 1, 2017	5.586%	4.7%
21	March 8, 2017	4.901%	3.9%
22	March 15, 2017	5.211%	4.4%
23	March 22, 2017	4.973%	4.6%
24	March 29, 2017	5.640%	5.0%
25	April 5, 2017	5.041%	4.9%
26	April 12, 2017	5.087%	4.8%
27	April 19, 2017	4.370%	4.9%
28	April 26, 2017	4.909%	4.4%
29	May 3, 2017	4.194%	4.4%
30	May 10, 2017	6.001%	6.2%
31	May 17, 2017	5.255%	5.3%
32	May 24, 2017	4.664%	5.0%
33	May 31, 2017	5.617%	5.2%
34	June 7, 2017	5.066%	4.8%
35	June 14, 2017	4.682%	4.8%
36	June 21, 2017	5.449%	5.1%
37	June 28, 2017	5.585%	4.7%
38	July 5, 2017	5.342%	5.7%
39	July 12, 2017	4.965%	5.4%
40	July 19, 2017	5.621%	6.0%
41	July 26, 2017	5.963%	5.7%
42	August 2, 2017	6.755%	7.3%
43	August 9, 2017	5.065%	5.6%
44	August 16, 2017	5.907%	5.8%
45	August 23, 2017	5.193%	5.5%
46	August 30, 2017	4.842%	4.9%
47	September 6, 2017	4.703%	5.6%
48	September 13, 2017	5.639%	5.7%
49	September 20, 2017	6.105%	6.1%
50	September 27, 2017	5.863%	5.5%
51	October 11, 2017	4.787%	6.1%
52	October 18, 2017	4.694%	5.1%
53	October 25, 2017	4.638%	4.9%
54	November 1, 2017	5.523%	6.4%
55	November 8, 2017	5.052%	5.1%
56	November 15, 2017	5.155%	5.9%
57	November 22, 2017	4.428%	5.0%
58	November 29, 2017	4.658%	5.0%
59	December 6, 2017	4.507%	4.8%
60	December 13, 2017	4.825%	5.3%
61	December 20, 2017	5.354%	5.0%
62	December 27, 2017	5.949%	5.2%

=== 2018 ===
List of ratings in 2018 (Episodes 63 – 110 + Special)

Episode #	Broadcast Date	AGB Ratings (Nationwide)	TNMS Ratings (Nationwide)
63	January 3, 2018	6.154%	6.0%
64	January 10, 2018	6.261%	4.9%
65	January 17, 2018	5.247%	4.5%
66	January 24, 2018	6.024%	5.6%
67	January 31, 2018	6.820%	5.9%
68	February 7, 2018	5.824%	6.0%
69	February 14, 2018	6.208%	6.0%
70	February 21, 2018	5.562%	4.4%
71	February 28, 2018	6.380%	6.6%
72	March 7, 2018	5.250%	5.2%
73	March 14, 2018	4.975%	4.6%
74	March 21, 2018	6.067%	5.2%
75	March 28, 2018	4.910%	4.4%
76	April 4, 2018	4.538%	4.4%
77	April 11, 2018	5.030%	5.2%
78	April 18, 2018	5.227%	4.2%
79	April 25, 2018	4.908%	4.9%
80	May 2, 2018	4.345%	4.1%
81	May 9, 2018	4.907%	5.2%
82	May 16, 2018	4.450%	4.5%
83	May 23, 2018	4.121%	3.8%
84	May 30, 2018	5.173%	5.2%
85	June 6, 2018	4.649%	4.627%
86	June 20, 2018	4.906%	4.5%
87	July 4, 2018	5.056%	5.2%
88	July 11, 2018	5.313%	5.1%
89	July 18, 2018	5.235%	—
90	July 25, 2018	4.458%	—
91	August 1, 2018	4.854%	4.7%
92	August 8, 2018	4.558%	5.0%
93	August 15, 2018	4.115%	4.5%
94	August 22, 2018	4.816%	4.4%
95	August 29, 2018	3.614%	4.2%
96	September 5, 2018	3.192%	4.1%
97	September 12, 2018	3.351%	4.0%
98	September 19, 2018	3.849%	3.9%
99	October 3, 2018	3.485%	3.2%
100	October 10, 2018	3.740%	—
101	October 17, 2018	3.147%	—
102	October 24, 2018	3.373%	—
103	October 31, 2018	2.583%	—
104	November 7, 2018	3.476%	3.2%
105	November 14, 2018	3.349%	3.2%
106	November 21, 2018	4.185%	4.3%
107	November 28, 2018	4.046%	—
108	December 5, 2018	3.548%	—
109	December 12, 2018	3.149%	—
110	December 19, 2018	3.882%	3.7%
Special	December 26, 2018	2.993%	3.0%

=== 2019 ===
List of ratings in 2019 (Episodes 111 – 157)

Episode #	Broadcast Date	AGB Nielsen Ratings	
Episode #	Broadcast Date	Nationwide	Seoul Capital Area
111	January 2, 2019	3.690%	3.357%
112	January 9, 2019	3.748%	3.524%
113	January 23, 2019	3.176%	3.235%
114	January 30, 2019	4.195%	4.386%
115	February 20, 2019	3.659%	3.742%
116	February 27, 2019	3.346%	3.293%
117	March 6, 2019	3.808%	3.804%
118	March 13, 2019	3.703%	3.665%
119	March 20, 2019	3.397%	3.170%
120	March 27, 2019	3.409%	3.387%
121	April 3, 2019	3.904%	3.981%
122	April 10, 2019	3.692%	3.867%
123	April 17, 2019	3.662%	3.828%
124	April 24, 2019	3.947%	4.272%
125	May 8, 2019	3.230%	3.674%
126	May 15, 2019	3.361%	3.100%
127	May 22, 2019	3.341%	3.624%
128	May 29, 2019	2.815%	3.019%
129	June 5, 2019	3.610%	3.715%
130	June 12, 2019	2.656%	2.859%
131	June 19, 2019	2.835%	2.724%
132	June 26, 2019	3.059%	3.247%
133	July 3, 2019	2.726%	2.789%
134	July 10, 2019	4.065%	3.886%
135	July 17, 2019	3.762%	3.023%
136	July 24, 2019	2.665%	—
137	July 31, 2019	3.550%	3.380%
138	August 7, 2019	3.667%	3.727%
139	August 14, 2019	3.108%	2.988%
140	August 21, 2019	3.290%	2.930%
141	August 28, 2019	3.181%	3.146%
142	September 4, 2019	3.089%	—
143	September 18, 2019	2.715%	—
144	September 25, 2019	3.022%	—
145	October 2, 2019	3.371%	3.111%
146	October 9, 2019	2.460%	—
147	October 16, 2019	2.569%	—
148	October 23, 2019	3.084%	3.135%
149	October 30, 2019	2.988%	3.061%
150	November 6, 2019	2.814%	2.733%
151	November 13, 2019	3.295%	3.208%
152	November 20, 2019	3.083%	3.206%
153	November 27, 2019	2.919%	2.818%
154	December 4, 2019	3.242%	3.685%
155	December 11, 2019	4.235%	4.271%
156	December 18, 2019	3.739%	3.991%
157	December 25, 2019	2.973%	—

=== 2020 ===
List of ratings in 2020 (Episodes 158 – 164)

Episode #	Broadcast Date	AGB Nielsen Ratings	
Episode #	Broadcast Date	Nationwide	Seoul Capital Area
158	January 1, 2020	3.982%	3.598%
159	January 8, 2020	2.7%	—
160	January 29, 2020	2.5%	—
161	February 5, 2020	2.5%	—
162	February 12, 2020	3.753%	3.350%
163	February 19, 2020	2.7%	—
164	February 26, 2020	3.939%	3.476%

== Cancellation of broadcasting ==
Date	Scheduled episode	Reason	Notes/References
June 13, 2018	86	2018 South Korean local elections	
June 27, 2018	87	South Korea vs Germany (2018 FIFA World Cup Group F)	A special episode was aired instead
September 26, 2018	99	Chuseok	Re-broadcast of A Taxi Driver
January 16, 2019	113	South Korea vs China PR (2019 AFC Asian Cup Group C)	
February 6, 2019	115	Seollal	Re-broadcast of Gonjiam: Haunted Asylum
February 13, 2019	115	Drink-driving controversy of guest Kim Byeong-ok	
May 1, 2019	125	Live broadcast of the 55th Baeksang Arts Awards	
September 11, 2019	143	Chuseok	Re-broadcast of The Odd Family: Zombie On Sale
January 15, 2020	160	U-23 Uzbekistan vs U-23 South Korea (2020 AFC U-23 Championship Group C)	
January 22, 2020	160	U-23 Australia vs U-23 South Korea (2020 AFC U-23 Championship Semi-finals)	
March 4, 2020	165	Stop recording the new episodes since January 27, 2020 due to COVID-19 pandemic (i.e. no new episode after the 164th episode broadcast on February 26, 2020)	
