= Nuteena =

Vegetarian meat analogue

A can of Nuteena, a vegetarian meat analogue made from peanuts, soy, corn, and rice flour

Nuteena was a vegetarian meat analogue made primarily from peanut meal, soy, corn, and rice flour. Its recipe was based on Nuttose, which John Harvey Kellogg (whose brother Will Keith Kellogg founded what is now Kellogg's) created in 1896 as the first American meat analog. Nuteena was especially popular among Seventh-day Adventists, many of whom choose to be vegetarian based on the health message promoted by their church.

== History ==
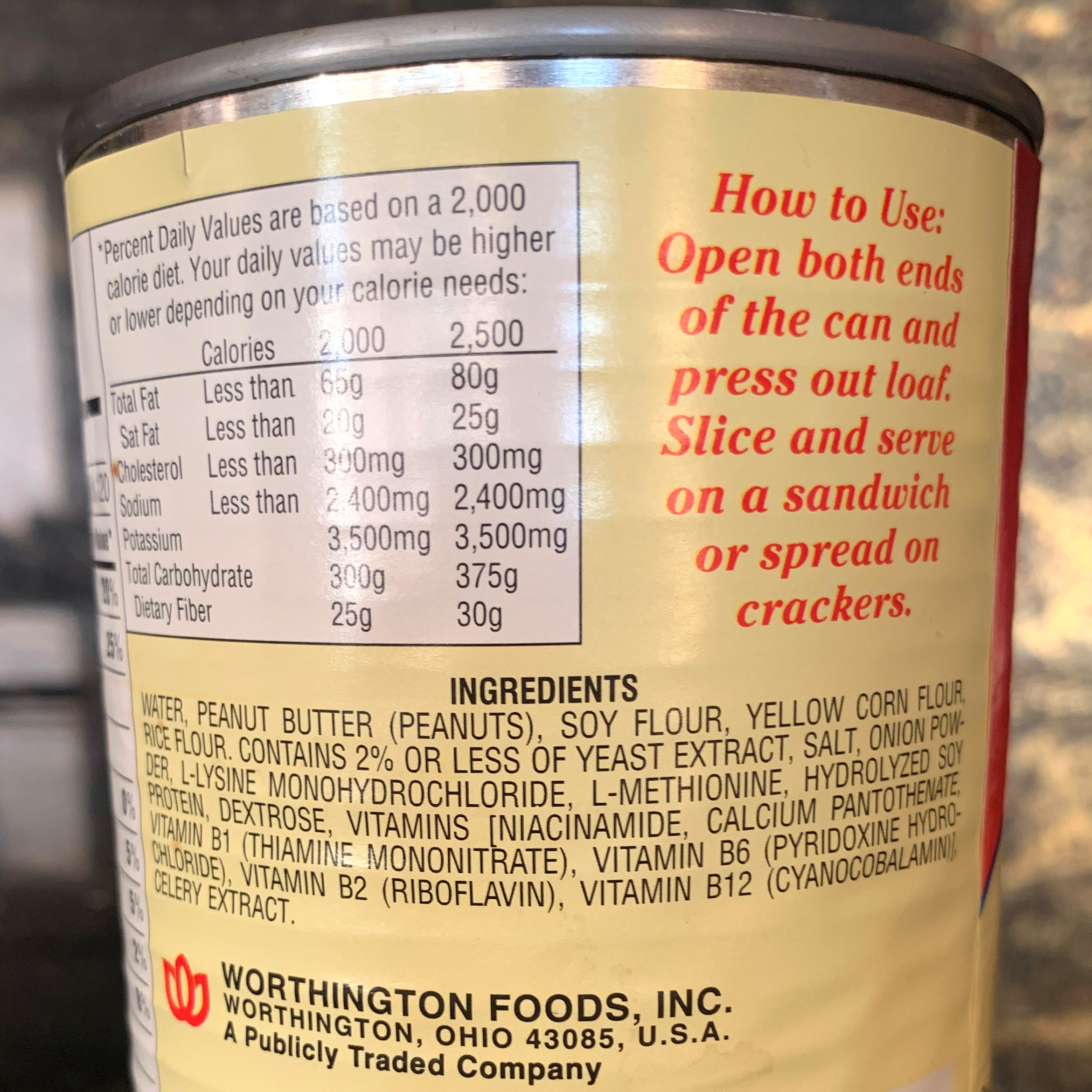
Nuteena ingredients and serving suggestions

Loma Linda Foods, a health food company owned by the Seventh-day Adventist Church, produced Nuteena starting in 1949. In 1980, Loma Linda Foods was purchased by Worthington Foods, which in turn was purchased by Kellogg's in 1999. Kellogg's discontinued production of Nuteena in 2005.
