= Yeomgok-dong =

Neighborhood in Seoul, South Korea

- Country: South Korea

Korean name
- Hangul: 염곡동
- Hanja: 廉谷洞
- RR: Yeomgok-dong
- MR: Yŏmgok-tong

Yeomgok-dong (Korean: 염곡동) is a dong (neighbourhood) of Seocho District, Seoul, South Korea. It is a legal dong (법정동 法定洞) administered under its administrative dong (행정동 行政洞), Naegok-dong.

== See also ==
- Administrative divisions of South Korea
