= Wolgye-dong =

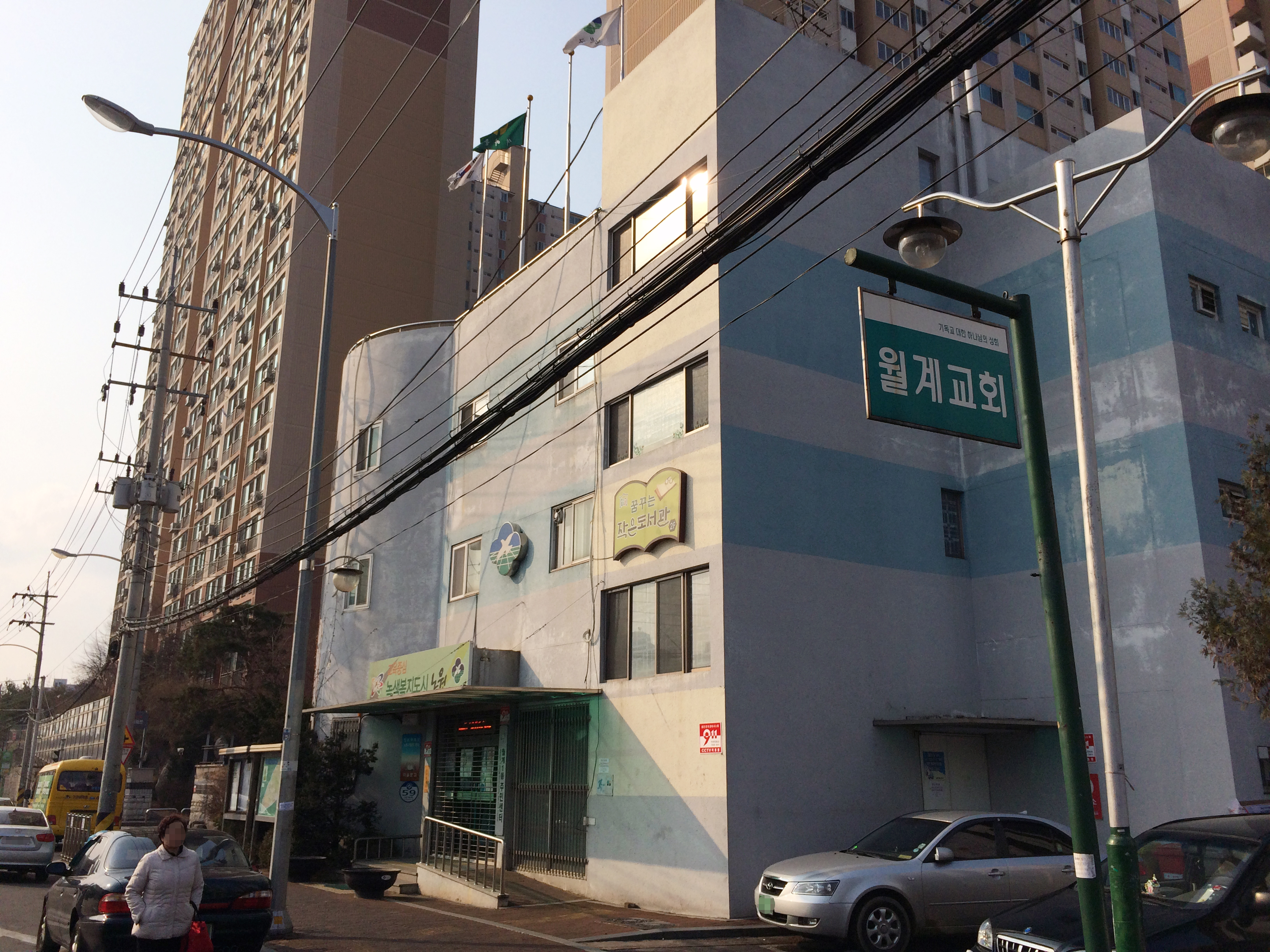
- Wolgye Community Service Centre in 2014
- Interactive map of Wolgye-dong
- Country: South Korea

Area
  - Total: 4.26 km^{2} (1.64 sq mi)

Population (2001)
  - Total: 90,311
  - Density: 21,200/km^{2} (54,900/sq mi)

Korean name
- Hangul: 월계동
- Hanja: 月溪洞
- RR: Wolgye-dong
- MR: Wŏlgye-dong

Wolgye-dong (Korean: 월계동) is a dong (neighbourhood) of Nowon District, Seoul, South Korea.

== See also ==
- Administrative divisions of South Korea
