= Sahmyook University =

University in Seoul, South Korea

- 삼육대학교
- Servants of Truth and Love
- Former name: Euimyung College (1906-1951)
- Motto: Prudentia, Animus, Corpus Corporis (Latin) 지(知), 영(靈), 체(體)
- Motto in English: Mind, Spirit, Body
- Type: Private
- Established: 1906; 120 years ago
- Religious affiliation: Seventh-day Adventist Church
- Chancellor: Chun Gwang Hwang
- President: Je Hae Jong (제해종)
- Location: Seoul, South Korea; 37.6434°N 127.1058°E
- Campus: Urban, 302 ha (3 km^{2})
- Colors: Royal Blue
- Website: www.syu.ac.kr or www.syu.ac.kr/web/eng/ (English)

Korean name
- Hangul: 삼육대학교
- Hanja: 三育大學校
- RR: Samyuk daehakgyo
- MR: Samyuk taehakkyo

Sahmyook University (Korean: 삼육대학교; Hanja: 三育大學校) is a private Christian, coeducational university located in Nowon-gu, Seoul, South Korea. Sahmyook University is part of a worldwide network of Seventh-day Adventist institutions of higher education. The school was founded in 1906 as Euimyung College in Sunahn, Pyeongan-namdo in what would become today's North Korea. It is today the largest university owned by the Seventh-day Adventist Church. As of 2016, the university had 6 colleges, including the College of Theology, Humanities & Social Science and Health Science & Social Welfare in addition to 4 graduate schools.

== History ==
=== Establishment of a mission college ===
Sahmyook University was founded in 1906 as a small, Seventh-day Adventist school called "Euimyung College" by American Seventh-day Adventist missionaries, with the objective to improve the education of church workers in Korea.

However, while under the rule of Japanese imperialism, the missionaries stopped managing the whole school system due to Shinto worship being enforced by the Japanese rulers. Thus, the school remained closed until the end of the Second World War. After Korea gained its independence from Japan in 1945, the school moved from Sunan and joined with the church headquarters Hoegi, Seoul; The move was completed in 1949.

On 25 June 1950, the Korean War forced the school to close again. After Seoul was won back in November 1951, the school was relocated to its current location at Gongdeok, Yangjoo, Gyeonggi (later renamed Seoul) and reopened. The school was also renamed Sahmyook College, and the minister, James Lee, was inaugurated as the first president.

== Applications ==
Each January, over 10,000 students apply at Sahmyook University. Only about 10 percent, or 1,242, of them (mostly non-Adventists) are accepted as new students. Non-Adventists have a higher ratio of successful applications compared with Adventist students. The number of Adventist students annually accepted is around 200, or about 1 in 6.

== Institutes and Research Centres ==
The university has the following research institutes:

- Geoscience Research Institute
- Korean Institute for HIV/AIDS Prevention
- Life Science Research Institute
- Mission and Society Research Institute
- The Korean Institute of Alcohol Problems
- Theological Research Institute
- Uimyung Research Institute for Neuroscience

== Study abroad opportunities ==
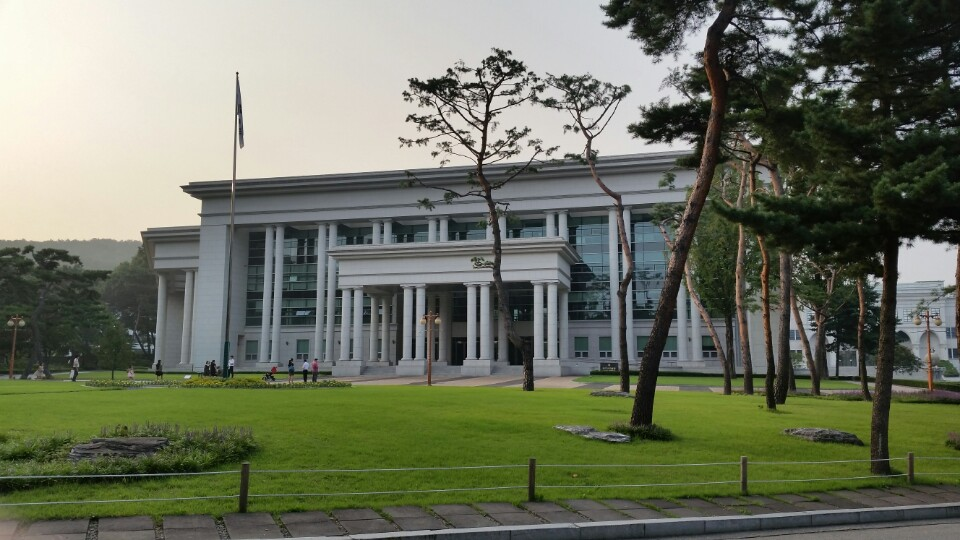
100th Anniversary Memorial Hall

Sahmyook University co-sponsors Adventist Colleges Abroad, a program in which qualified students study overseas while completing requirements for graduation at Sahmyook University. Undergraduate students may also study abroad. Affiliation and Extension Programs are offered in Puerto Rico, South Africa, Mexico, England, Jamaica, Canada, Romania, India, Russia, Thailand, Italy, Ukraine, Bolivia and the United States. (For the full list of sister universities, go to ▶)

== Notable people ==
=== Notable alumni ===
- Lee Han, tenor and professor at Sangji University
- Lee Dong-hoon, men's figure skater
- Jin Goo, actor
- Lee Seung-ryul, soccer player

== See also ==
- List of Seventh-day Adventist colleges and universities
- Seventh-day Adventist education
- Sahmyook Foods
- Sahmyook Language School
- Sahmyook Medical Center
- List of universities in Seoul
- List of colleges and universities in South Korea
- Education in South Korea
