= Seoul National University of Science and Technology =

National university in South Korea

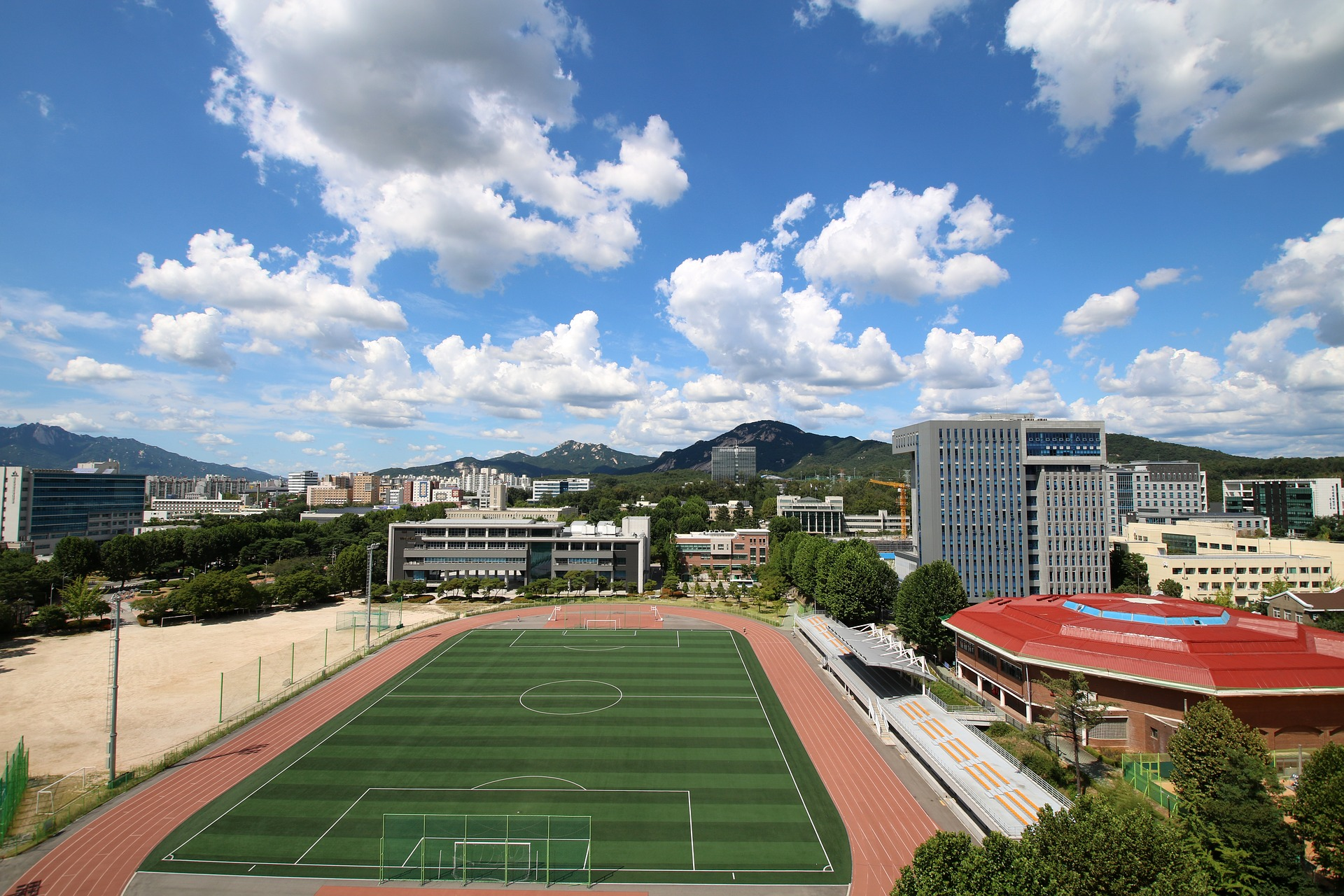
- Campus of SeoulTech
- Former names: Seoul National Industrial University (1988–1993); Seoul National University of Technology (1993–2010)
- Motto: Our Dream, Your Future.
- Type: National
- Established: 1910; 116 years ago
- President: Kim Dong-hwan (김동환)
- Faculty: 865 (2020)
- Administrative staff: 1329 (2020)
- Students: 11,472 (2020)
- Undergraduates: 9,929 (2020)
- Postgraduates: 1,543 (2020)
- Location: 232 Gongneung-ro, Nowon-gu, Seoul, South Korea; 37°37′54″N 127°04′43″E
- Campus: Urban
- Colors: Royal blue
- Nicknames: SeoulGwagidae (서울과기대·서울科技大)
- Mascot: Black Dragon
- Website: www.seoultech.ac.kr

Korean name
- Hangul: 서울과학기술대학교
- Hanja: 서울科學技術大學校
- RR: Seoul gwahak gisul daehakgyo
- MR: Sŏul kwahak kisul taehakkyo

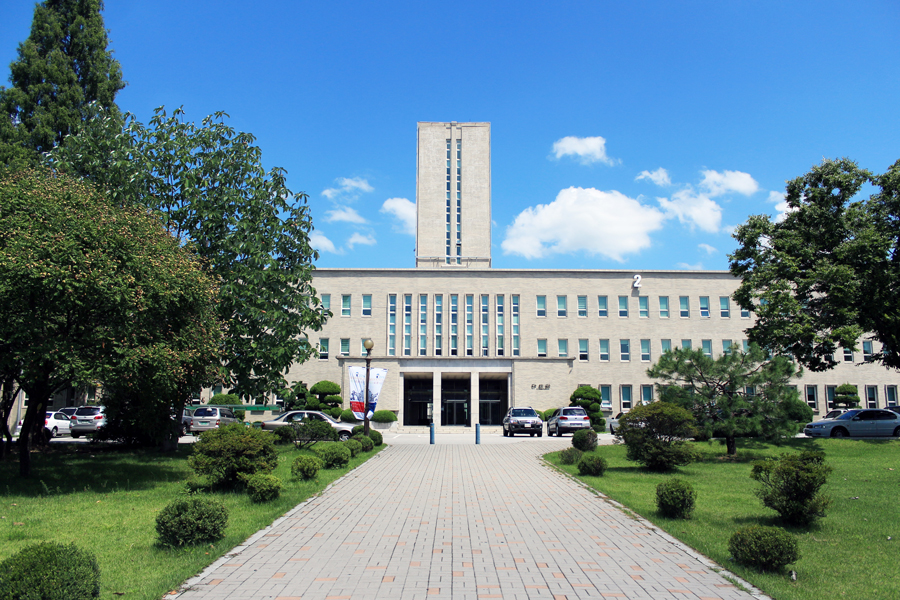

Seoul National University of Science and Technology (abbreviated SeoulTech) is a national university located in Nowon-gu, Seoul, South Korea.

Seoul National University of Science and Technology originated from Public Eoeudong Vocational Continuing School. Later the school was re-organized as Gyeongseong Public Industrial School, Gyeonggi Technical College, and Seoul National University of Technology before it was finally reborn as Seoul National University of Science and Technology in September 2010 to celebrate the 100th anniversary of its foundation. The institution is also known as 'Seoultech'.

Today Seoultech is a large and comprehensive university consisting of six colleges, 23 departments, seven graduate schools and a student enrolment of 11,500 people in a spacious campus of 508,690 square meters (125.70 acres). This is the fifth-largest campus in the universities of Seoul. The campus, formerly occupied by the colleges of engineering of Seoul National University, is in Nowon-gu in the northern part of Seoul. Seoul National University of Science and Technology was ranked second in South Korea and 23rd in Asia in field of focused university in the 2015 by Quacquarelli Symonds (QS) and ranked 15th in South Korea in the field of Science and Engineering in 2015 by Korea Economic Daily (한국경제신문).

== Departments ==
=== Undergraduate Colleges ===
College of Engineering

- Department of Mechanical System and Design Engineering
  - Mechanical Design and Automation Engineering Program
  - Mechanical Design and Manufacturing Engineering Program
- Department of Mechanical & Automotive Engineering
  - Mechanical Engineering Program
  - Automotive Engineering Program
- Department of Safety Engineering
- Department of Materials Science & Engineering
- Department of Civil Engineering
- School of Architecture
  - Architecture Program
  - Architectural Engineering Program

College of Information and Communication Engineering

- Department of Electrical and Information Engineering
- Department of Electronic and IT Media Engineering
  - Electronic Engineering Program
  - Media IT Engineering Program
- Department of Computer Science and Engineering

College of Energy and Biotechnology

- Department of Chemical and Biomolecular Engineering
- Department of Environmental Engineering
  - Environmental Engineering Program
  - Environmental Policy Program
- Department of Food Science and Technology
- Department of Fine Chemistry
- Department of Optometry
- Department of Sports Science

College of Art and Design

- Department of Design
  - Visual Communication Design Program
  - Industrial Design Program
- Department of Ceramic Arts and Design
- Department of Metal arts & Design
- Department of Fine Arts

College of Humanities and Social Sciences

- Department of English Language and Literature
- Department of Science of Public Administration
  - Major in Science of Public Administration
  - Major in Environmental Public Administration
- Department of Creative Writing

College of Business and Technology

- Department of Industrial and Systems Engineering
  - Major in Industrial and Information Systems Engineering
  - Major in Manufacturing Systems and Design Engineering (MSDE)
  - Major in IT Management (ITM)
- Department of Business Administration
  - Major in Business Administration
  - Major in Global Technology Management (GTM)

=== Graduate school ===
There are three professional graduate schools and three special graduate schools within the university. Aside from these, there are a number of specialist research institutes.

Graduate School of Engineering:

- Department of Mechanical Design and Robot Engineering
- Department of Mechanical Engineering
- Department of Safety Engineering
- Department of Product Design and Manufacturing Engineering
- Department of Data Science
- Department of Materials Science & Engineering
- Department of Automotive Engineering
- Department of Civil Engineering
- Department of Architectural
- Department of Electrical and Information Engineering
- Department of Electronic Engineering
- Department of Computer Science and Engineering
- Department of Media IT Engineering
- Department of Chemical Engineering
- Department of Environmental Engineering
- Department of Food Science and Technology
- Convergence Institute of Biomedical Engineering and Biomaterials
- Department of Interdisciplinary Bio IT Materials

Graduate School of Science:

- Department of Fine Chemistry
- Department of Optometry

Graduate School of Art and Physical Education:

- Department of Industrial Design
- Department of Visual Design
- Department of Ceramic Art
- Department of Metal Arts & Design
- Department of Fine Arts
- Department of Sports Science

Graduate School of Humanities and Social Sciences:

- Department of Business Administration
- Department of English Language and Literature
- Department of Creative Writing

==== Professional Graduate Schools ====
Graduate School of Railway:

- Department of Railway Management & Policy
- Department of Railway Construction
- Department of Electric & Signaling Engineering
- Department of Rolling Stock System
- Department of Railway System

Graduate School of Public Policy and Information Technology:

- Department of Public Policy
- Department of Industrial & Information Systems
- Department of Broadcasting and Communication Policy
- Department of Digital & Cultural Policy

Graduate School of Energy and Environment

- Department of New Energy Engineering
- Department of Environmental Energy Engineering
- Department of Energy System Engineering
- Department of Energy Safety Engineering
- Department of Energy Policy
- Graduate School of Nano IT Design Fusion
- Nano IT Fusion Program
- Broadcasting Communication Fusion Program
- IT Design Fusion Program

==== Special graduate schools, evening course ====
Graduate School of Industry

- Convergence Program of Healthcare & Biomedical Engineering
- Disaster Safety & Fire Protection Program
- Management of Technology Program
- Global Project Management Program
- Manufacturing Technology Convergence Program
- Department of Food Science and Technology
- Department of Civil Engineering
- Department of Architectural Design
- Department of Metal Art & Design

Graduate School of Housing

- Department of Housing Environment and Service Technology
- Department of Housing Construction Engineering
- Department of Housing Planning and Design
- Department of Housing Management
- Department of Housing Development and Management

== Library ==
The library at Seoul National University of Science and Technology has been operational since the foundation of Eoeudong Public Vocational Continuing School in April 1910. Today, the Library has 600,987 volumes, 11,928 e-books, 23,259 audiovisual materials, and 446 periodicals and academic journals published domestically and abroad.

The Central Library building, completed at the end of 2004, consists of three stories with an area of 9,281 m^{2} (2,807 pyeong). The first floor houses the library office, seminar rooms, Western archive, and information processing center. The second floor is occupied with Eastern archives and references, periodicals, and an academic journal room. The third floor houses a multimedia room, group study room, and reading room. The annex to Central Library, remodelled in 2011, is a building with an area of 4,896.25 m^{2} (1,400 pyeong) that is equipped with a reference room, reference room for western books, room for study groups, notebook computer reading room and general reading room. The library has collected academic research works of the professors and the students for the past 100 years.

== Other support facilities ==
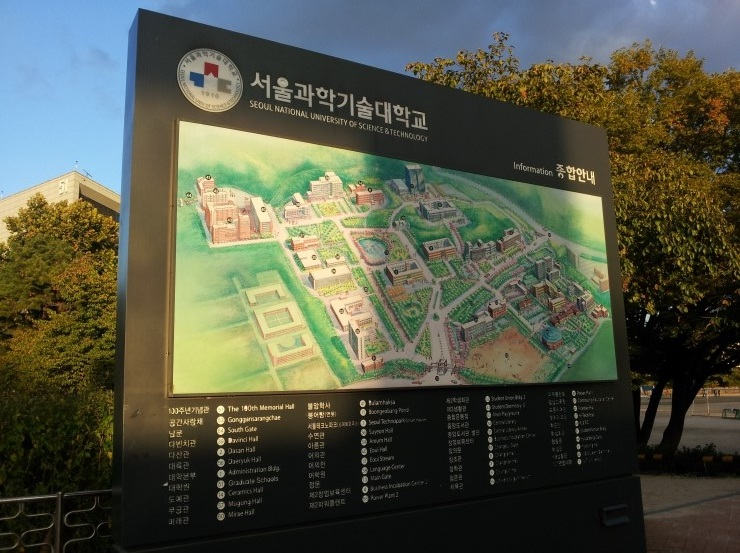
Seoul National University of Science and Technology campus map

Aside from the library there is also an Information and Computer Center; a Press and Broadcasting Center; a General Laboratory Building; a Business Incubation Center; an Educational Equipment Management & Technical Support Center; and an International Office/ Centre for International Exchange. Finally, there is an Institute for Language Education and Research staffed by twenty native-speaking English instructors.

== Scholarships ==
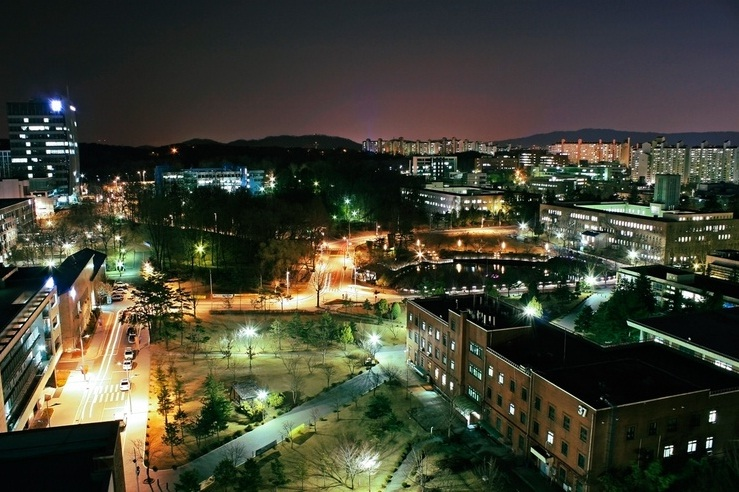
The part of campus of Seoul National University of Science and Technology

About half of the student body benefit from a scholarship program which offers education at a comparatively low cost. In 2015, about 6,000 of 11,500 students benefited from scholarship. The school's current tuition only amounts to 40% of an average private university's costs and 80% of tuition fees charged by other national universities. In 2014, 47% of tuition was reused for scholarships. Seoultech also has a number of funded international cooperation programs, and two joint degree programs with Northumbria University in the United Kingdom.

== The Institute for Language Education and Research ==
The Institute for Language Education and Research (ILER) provides a variety of language programs to serve the university's English, Korean, Chinese and Japanese learning needs. There are currently 26 full-time faculty positions. The ILER has a dedicated language center building which houses all needed facilities: professors' offices, administration offices, conference hall, conversation classrooms with round tables, etc. The ILER is a developing PLC (Professional Learning Community), focused on modernizing curriculum, expanding opportunities for research and publication, and fostering a spirit of intercultural exchange.

== Symbols ==
In March 2014, the university's Public Relations Office held its first Symbolic Committee to determine its symbolism. Following the first questionnaire for teachers and faculty members in April 2013, we conducted a second questionnaire involving 12,807 undergraduate and graduate students in June 2013 in order to enact the symbol of university. The second questionnaire for undergraduate and graduate students who answered 91% of the total enrollment was Daesanbang, Sycamore, and Symbolic Animals. Haitai won the most votes.

== Rankings ==
In 2021, Seoul National University of Science and Technology ranked 51-100 globally in Petroleum Engineering field, 200-240 globally in Art and Design field, and 401-450 globally in Electrical and Electronic Engineering based on QS Subject Ranking.

University rankings
JoongAng National	Domestic	=20
QS National	General	=38
THE National	General	=31
USNWR National	General	38
QS Asia (Asia version)	General	=238
THE Asia (Asia version)	General	351–400
USNWR Asia	General	=604
QS World	General	1201–1400
THE World	General	1201–1500
USNWR World	General	1614

== History ==
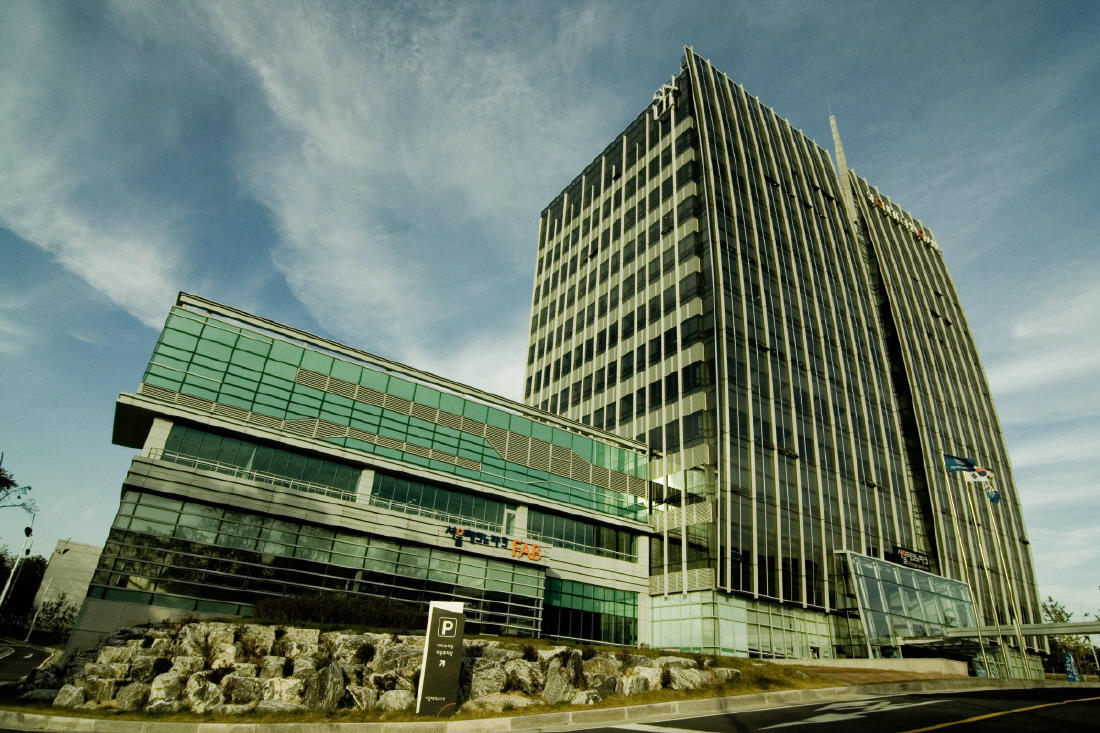
Seoul Techno Park, NT and IT Educational-Industrial Cooperation center

- November 9, 2015 – Inauguration of Jong-Ho Kim as 11th president
- March 1, 2012 – Seoul National University of Science and Technology, Technology University to Broad General University transition
- October 25, 2011 – Inauguration of Keun NamKoong as tenth president
- September 1, 2010 – Changed university name From Seoul National University of Technology to Seoul National University of Science & Technology
- September 1, 2010 – Completion of Centennial (100-year) Memorial Sculpture construction
- February 1, 2010 – Completion of Frontier hall construction
- December 3, 2009 – Completion of the construction of Centennial(100-year) Memorial Hall (start of the construction, April 3, 2007)
- March 1, 2008 – Opening of Graduate School of NID Fusion Technology
- March 1, 2008 – Completion of Seoul Techno Park(STP) construction
- January 1, 2008 – Completion of Student Dormitory III construction
- October 17, 2007 – Inauguration of Jun-Hyong Roh as ninth president
- October 1, 2007 – Completion of Language Center construction
- August 1, 2007 – Completion of Student Dormitory II construction
- June 1, 2006 – Completion of Mirae Hall construction
- September 1, 2005 – Designation authorization of Seoul Technopark
- February 25, 2005 – Completion of Student Library II construction
- December 17, 2004 – Establishment authorization of Seoul Technopark Nonprofit Corporation
- September 23, 2004 – Foundation of Seoul Technopolis Promotion Center and Center for Engineering Education
- March 26, 2004 – Inauguration of Dr. Jin-Shin Yoon as eighth president
- September 27, 2003 – Establishment of SNUT Industry-Academic Alliance Corporation
- September 23, 2003 – Establishment authorization of Graduate School of Energy & Environment
- April 21, 2003 – Inauguration of Dr. Hee-Beom Lee as seventh president
- March 1, 2003 – Establishment of Graduate School of Public Policy & Information Technology
- March 1, 2002 – Change of Graduate School of Railroad Technology to Graduate School of Railroad (PhD Course)
- February 24, 2001 – Foundation of Graduate School of Housing
- March 1, 2000 – Foundation of Graduate School of Railroad Technology
- March 1, 2000 – Foundation of Department of English, Department of Creative Writing and Department of Social Sports Science (Daytime)
- Establishment a dual bachelor's dual program in collaboration with Northumbria University in the UK
- April 1, 1999 – Inauguration of Dr. Jin-Seol Lee as sixth president
- April 2, 1998 – Opening of Foreign Language Education Center
- April 1, 1998 – Opening of Laboratory Center
- October 6, 1995 – Foundation of Materials Science and Engineering, Graduate School of Industry & Engineering
- April 1, 1995 – Inauguration of Dr. Dong-Gyu Choi as fifth president
- September 3, 1994 – Foundation of Computer Science and Engineering, Graduate School of Industry & Engineering
- March 1, 1994 – Foundation of Department of Creative Writing and Department of Social Sports Science
- March 1, 1993 – Foundation of Design and Automobile Engineering and Automatic Chemical Engineering, Graduate School of Industry & Engineering
- February 24, 1993 – Renamed Seoul National University of Technology in accordance with the revision of national school establishment decree (Presidential Decree No. 13895, February 24, 1993)
- November 24, 1992 – Foundation of Industry Craft, Graduate School of Industry & Engineering. Completion of Dormitory construction
- March 1, 1992 – Foundation of Department of Industry Administration and Department of Fine Chemistry Foundation of School of Engineering III, School of Engineering IV and School of Humanities, Social and Natural Sciences
- March 21, 1991 – Inauguration of Prof. Dae-Byeong Yoon as fourth president
- March 1, 1990 – Foundation of School of Engineering I, School of Engineering II, School of Art & Design, and Department of Applied Fine Arts
- November 15, 1989 – Foundation of Electric Engineering, Chemical Engineering and Mechanical Design and Automation Engineering, Graduate School of Industry & Engineering
- March 1, 1988 – Renamed Seoul National Industrial University (Presidential Decree No. 1407, February 24, 1988)
- March 21, 1987 – Inauguration of Dr. Dong-Hee Lee as third president
- February 29, 1984 – Foundation of Department of Environmental Engineering, Department of Industrial Safety Engineering, and Department of Mould Design
- March 30, 1983 – Inauguration of Dr. Ho-Keun Kim as second president
- December 31, 1982 – Closing of Gyunggi Technical College in accordance with the revision of national school establishment decree
- March 1979 – Inauguration of Dr. Soon-Cheol Hong as first dean
- March 1974 – Renamed Gyunggi Technical College
- March 1963 – Renamed Gyunggi Technical High Special School
- March 1953 – Renamed Gyunggi Technical High School
- March 1944 – Reorganized into Gyunggi Public Technical School
- March 1931 – Reorganized into Gyungsung Public Vocational School
- April 15, 1910 – Public Eoeudong Vocational Continuing School

== See also ==
- List of national universities in South Korea
- List of universities and colleges in South Korea
- Education in Korea
