= Hagye-dong =

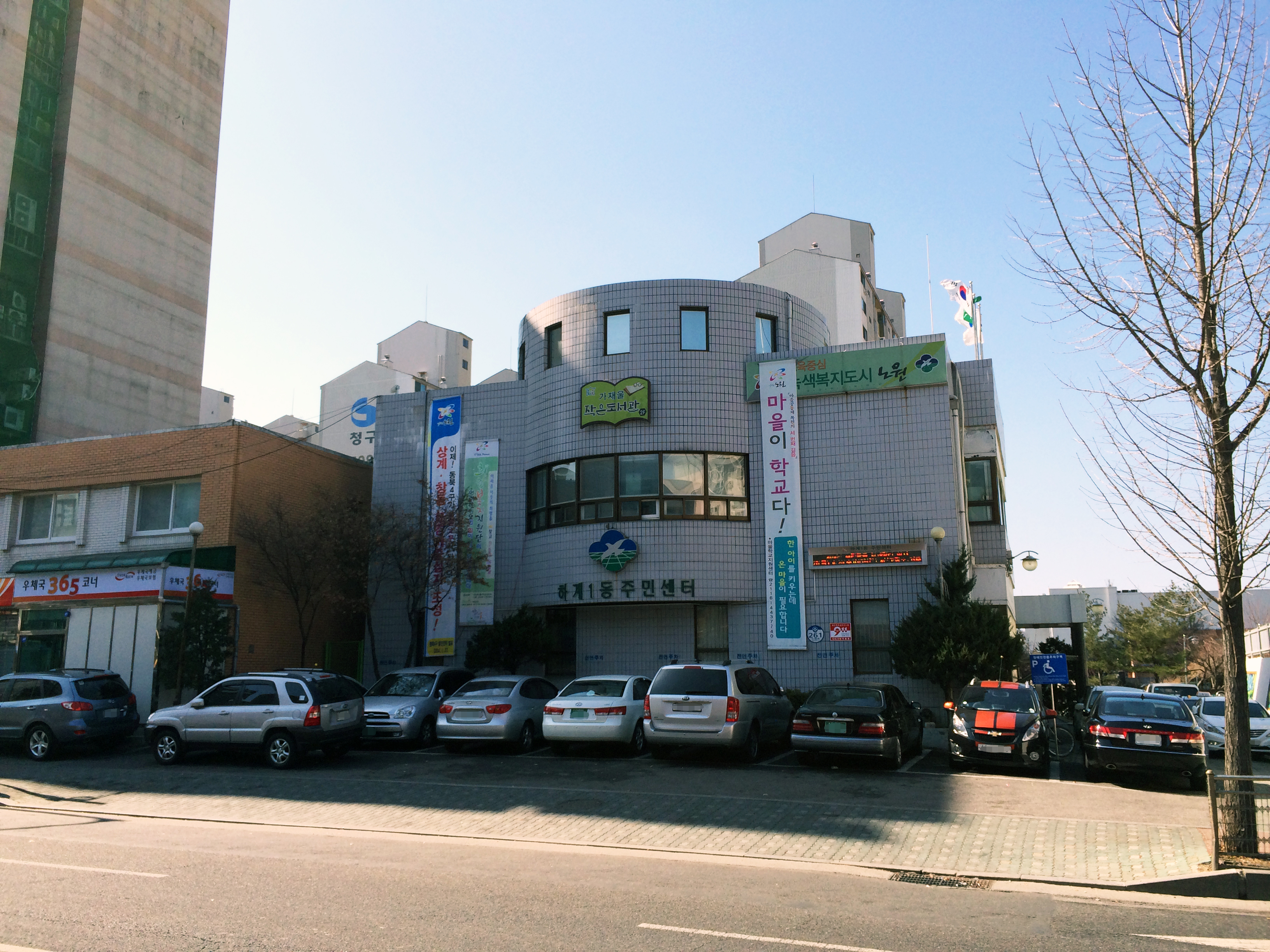
- Hagye 1-dong Community Service Center (Nowon-gu)
- Country: South Korea

Area
  - Total: 2.03 km^{2} (0.78 sq mi)

Population (2001)
  - Total: 63,018
  - Density: 31,000/km^{2} (80,400/sq mi)

Korean name
- Hangul: 하계동
- Hanja: 下溪洞
- RR: Hagye-dong
- MR: Hagye-dong

Hagye-dong (Korean: 하계동) is a dong (neighborhood) of Nowon District, Seoul, South Korea.

== See also ==
- Administrative divisions of South Korea
