= Chebu-dong =

Coordinates: 37.577°N 126.971°E

- Sejong Village Food Street
- Interactive map of Chebu-dong
- Country: South Korea

Area
  - Total: 0.05 km^{2} (0.019 sq mi)

Korean name
- Hangul: 체부동
- Hanja: 體府洞
- RR: Chebu-dong
- MR: Ch'ebu-dong

Chebu-dong (Korean: 체부동) is a dong (neighborhood) of Jongno District, Seoul, South Korea. It is a legal dong (Korean: 법정동; Hanja: 法定洞) administered under its administrative dong (Korean: 행정동; Hanja: 行政洞), Sajik-dong.

Chebu-dong includes a significant part of the recently protected hanok cluster of Seochon area.

== See also ==
- Administrative divisions of South Korea
