= Junggye-dong =

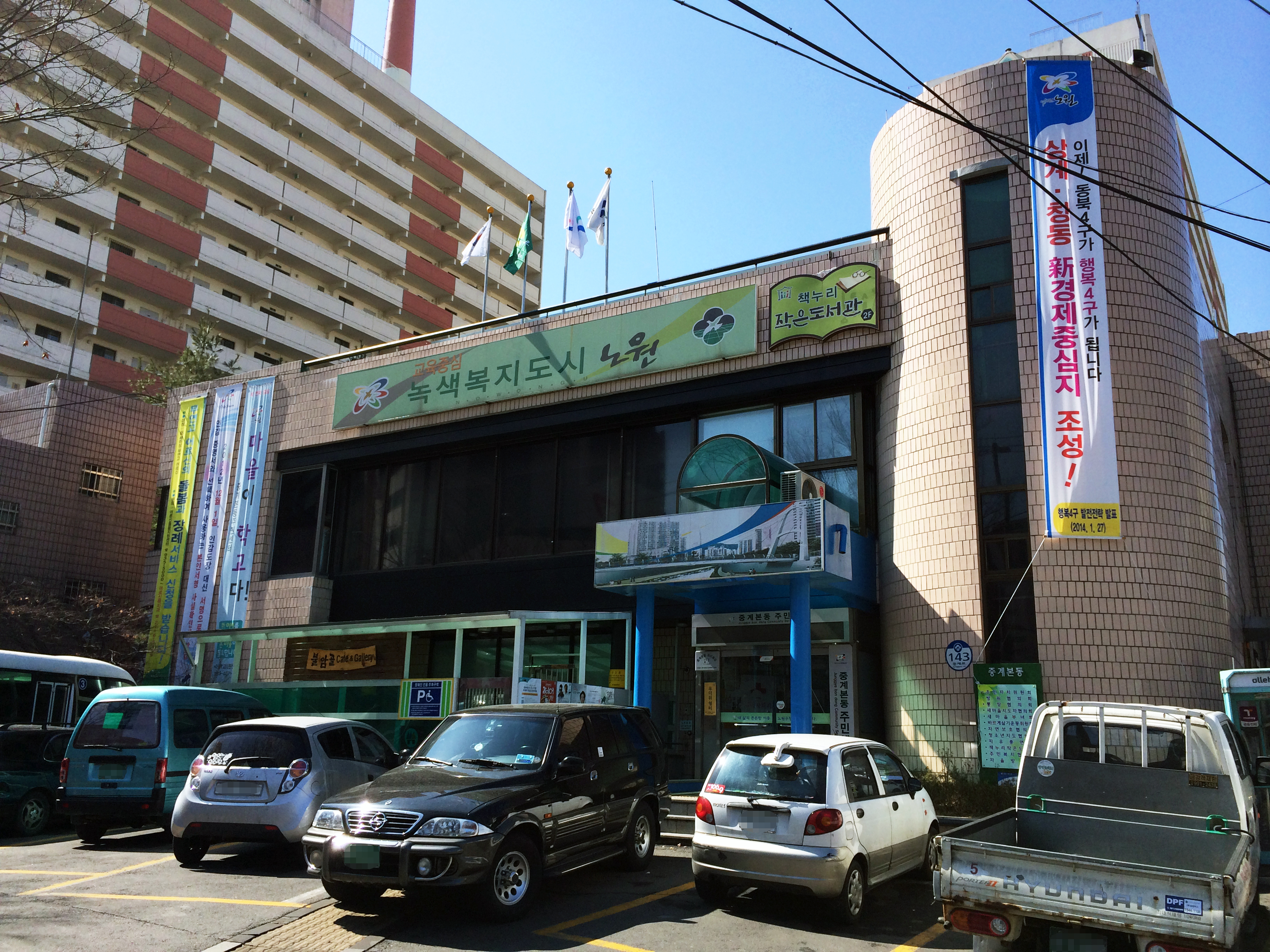
- Junggyebon-dong Community Service Center (Nowon District)
- Country: South Korea

Area
  - Total: 5.23 km^{2} (2.02 sq mi)

Population (2001)
  - Total: 136,366
  - Density: 26,100/km^{2} (67,500/sq mi)

Korean name
- Hangul: 중계동
- Hanja: 中溪洞
- RR: Junggye-dong
- MR: Chunggye-dong

Junggye-dong (Korean: 중계동) is a dong, neighbourhood of Nowon District, Seoul, South Korea.

In April 2013, multiplex cinema CGV Junggye opened in Junggye-dong. The neighborhood centers around bank intersection, named for the four banks on each of the four corners.

== See also ==
- Administrative divisions of South Korea
