= Naegok-dong =

Neighborhood in Seoul, South Korea

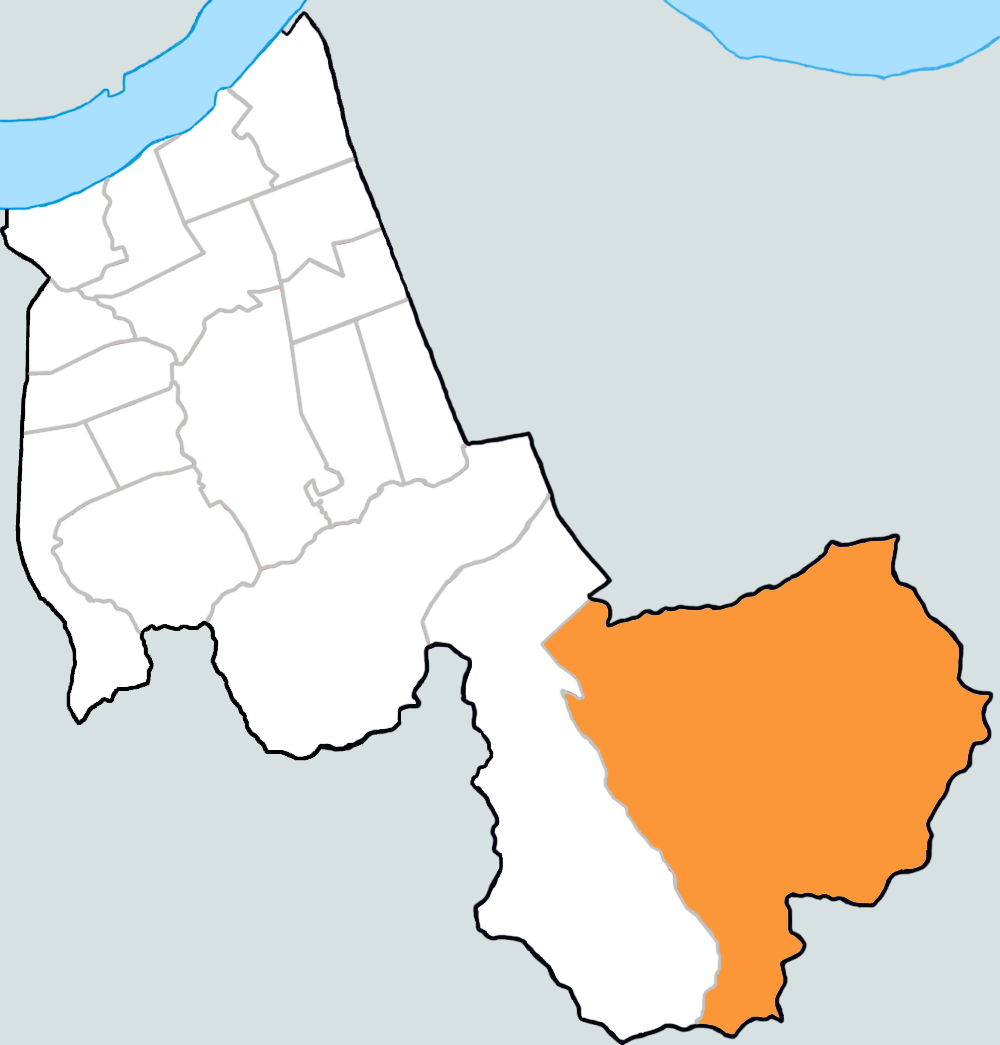
- Naegok-dong within Seocho District
- Coordinates: 40°3′48″N 33°0′34″E
- Country: South Korea

Area
  - Total: 12.69 km^{2} (4.90 sq mi)

Population (2012)
  - Total: 5,964
  - Density: 470.0/km^{2} (1,217/sq mi)

Korean name
- Hangul: 내곡동
- Hanja: 內谷洞
- RR: Naegok-dong
- MR: Naegok-tong

Naegok-dong (Korean: 내곡동) is a dong (neighbourhood) of Seocho District, Seoul, South Korea.

== Overview ==
Naegok-dong, formerly part of the historical Eonju district, was initially situated within the central village, known in Chinese characters as 'Angol' or 'Anmal'. Over time, this area evolved into Naegok-dong, located near the base of Guryong Mountain within Seocho District. It resides within a basin surrounded by mountains, including Guryong Mountain in Seocho District and Inreungsan, which forms the boundary with Seongnam.

Presently, Naegok-dong comprises various natural villages such as Heonneungmal, Saemmaeul, Neunganmaeul, and Sinheungmaeul. Historically, during the Joseon period, the area accommodated Heoninreung, inhibiting residential expansion, and was densely forested with sightings of wildlife like tigers and foxes. The Gyeongju Kim clan first settled in Naegok-dong.

The surrounding mountains include Guryong Mountain in Seocho District and Inneungsan, which marks the border with Seongnam. On Guryong Mountain's slopes in Naegok-dong, Yeongneung (英陵), originally the burial site of King Sejong the Great, was relocated to Yeoju in 1469 (Year 1 of King Yejong). Hyeonneung and Inneung are currently situated at 13-1 San, Naegok-dong.

== Education ==
- High Schools
  - Daniel High School
- Elementary Schools
  - Naegok Elementary School
  - Eonnam Elementary School

== See also ==
- Administrative divisions of South Korea
