= Nowon District =

District of Seoul, South Korea

Nowon
- Autonomous District
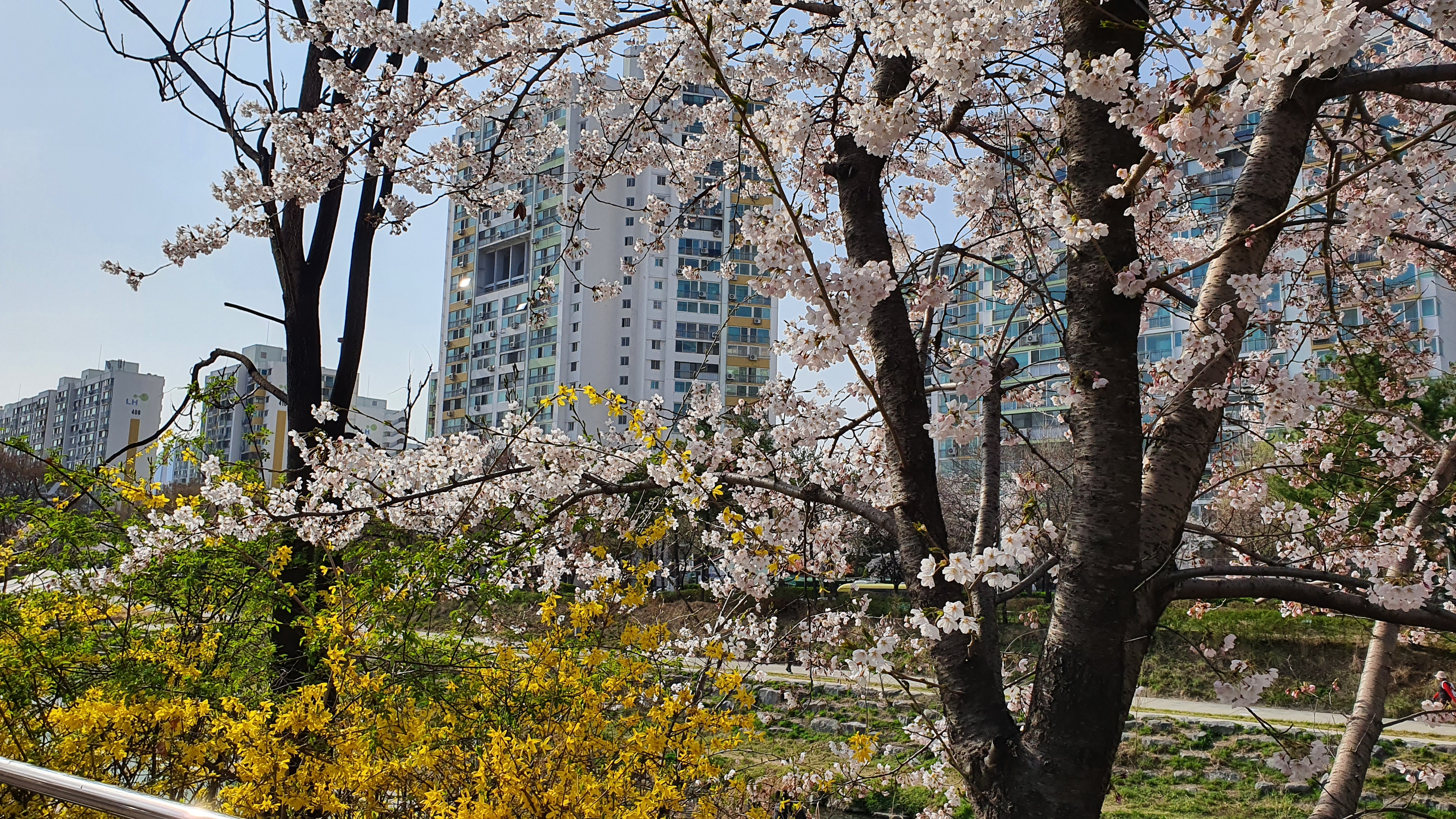
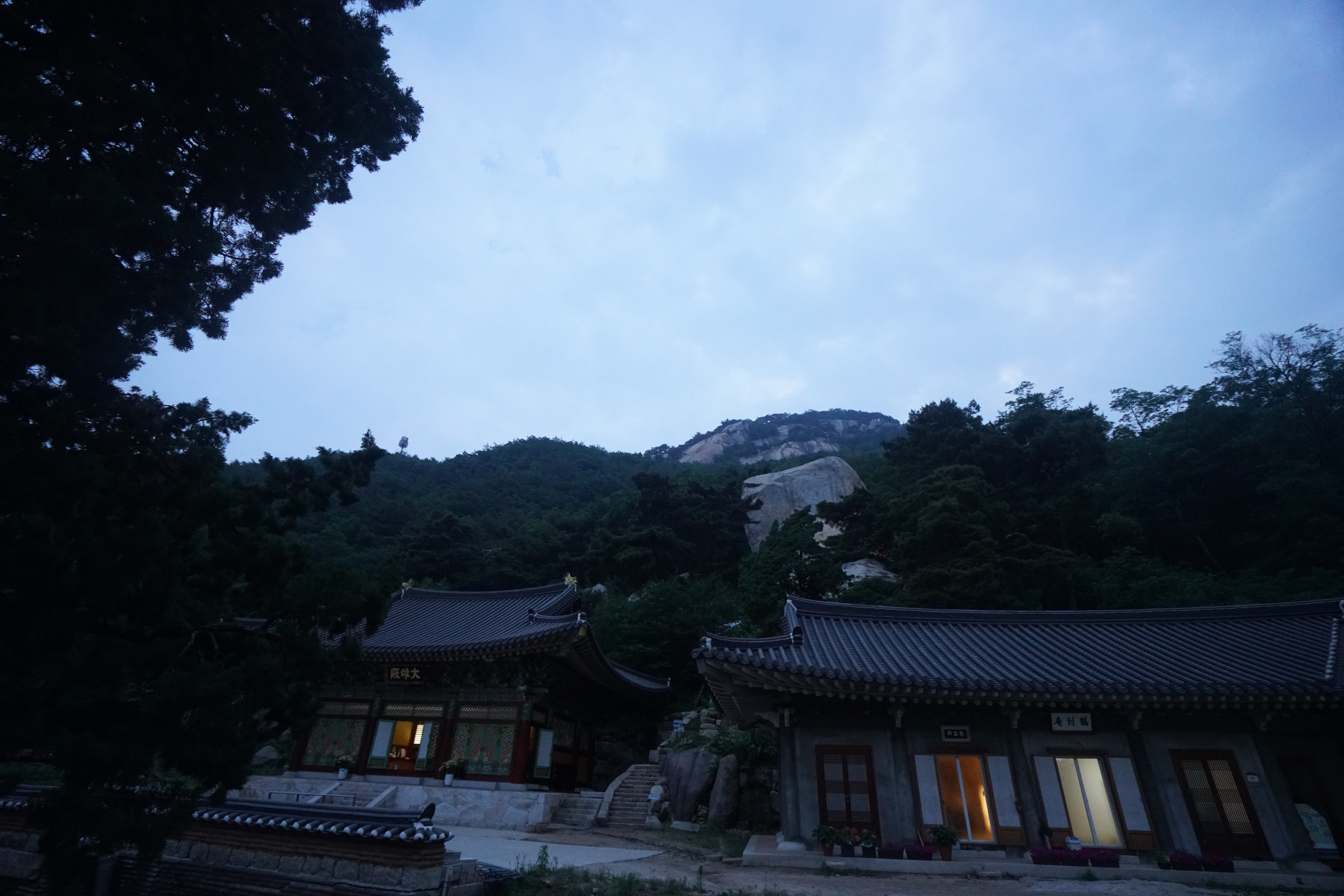
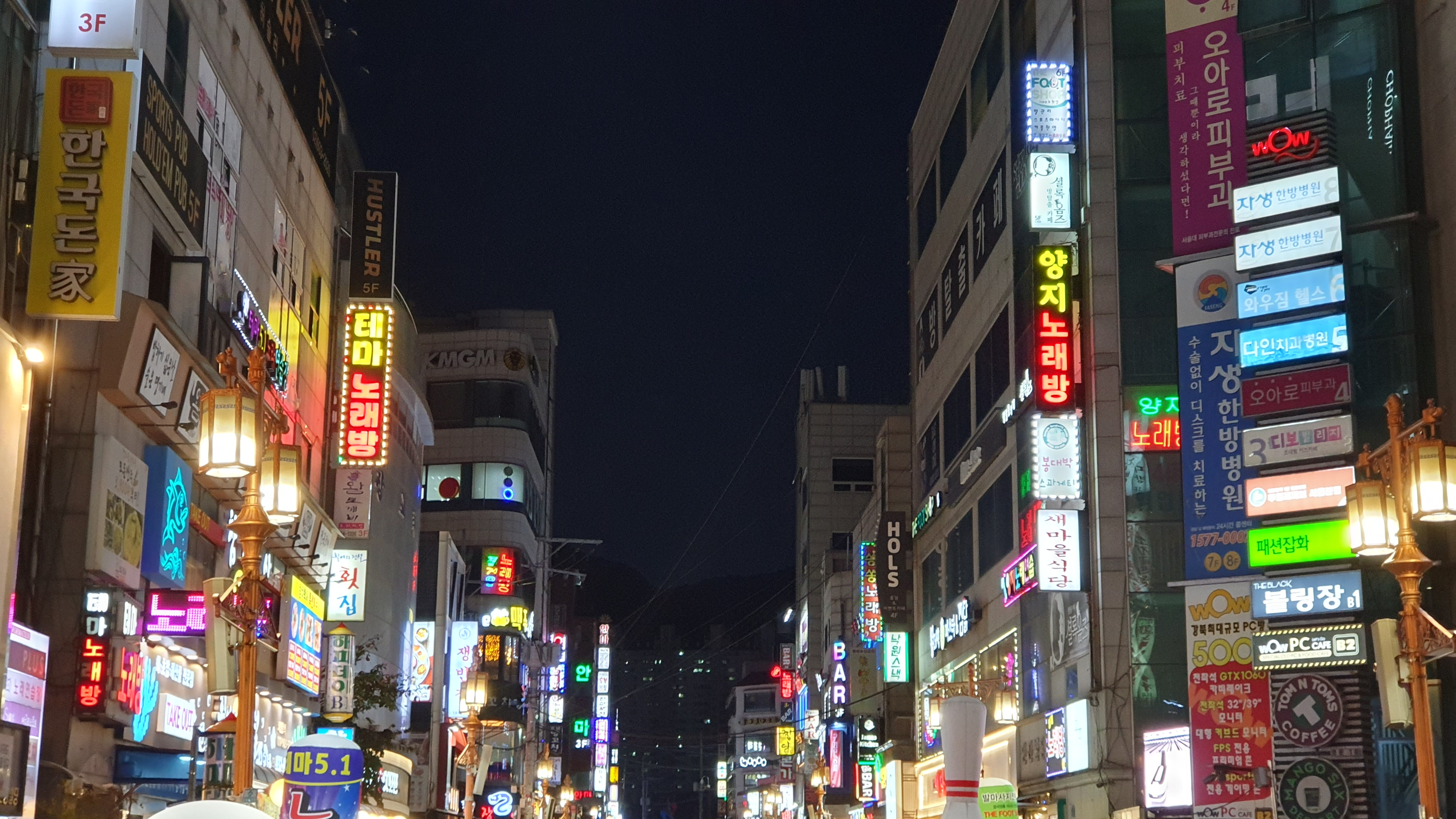
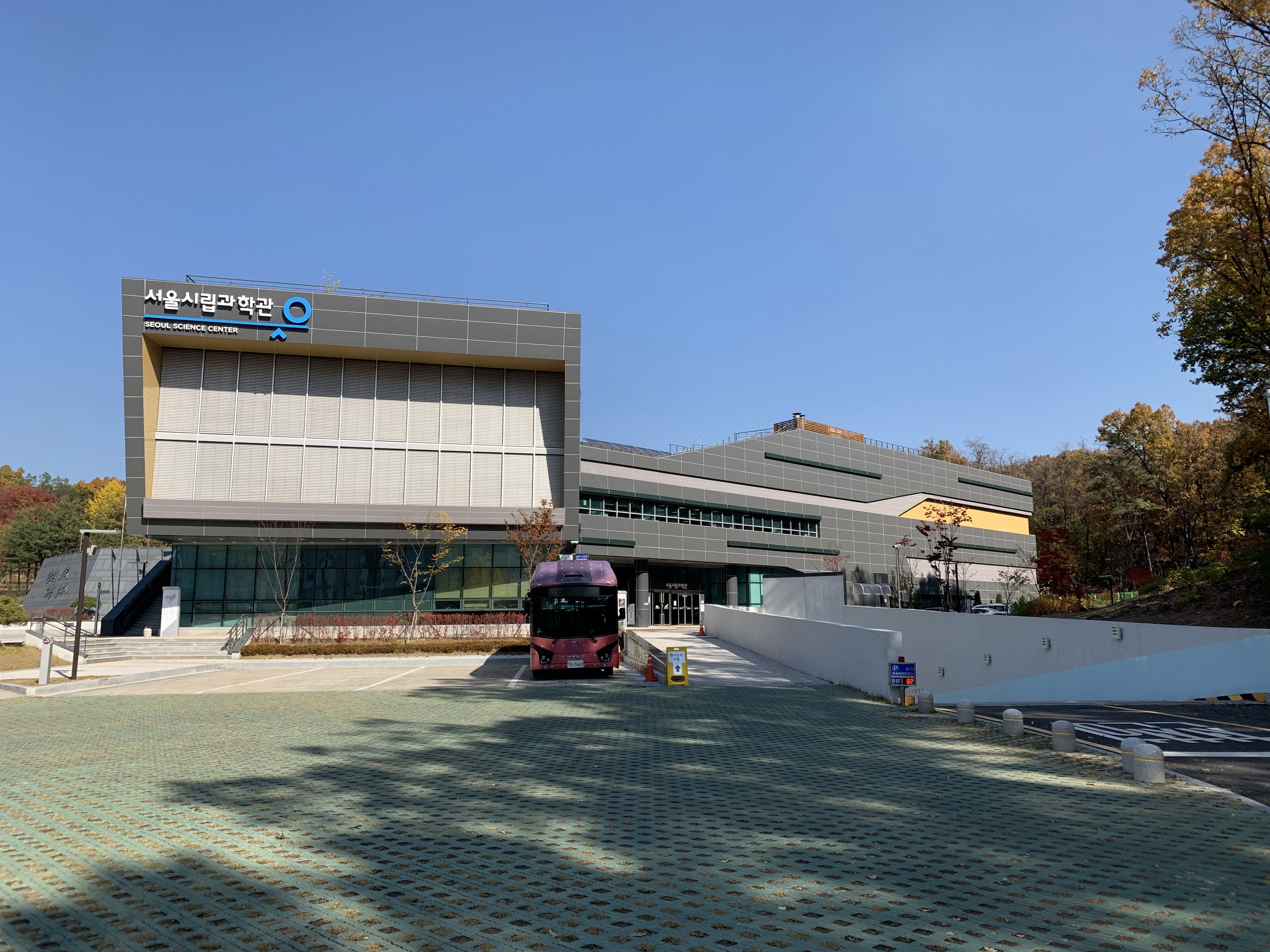
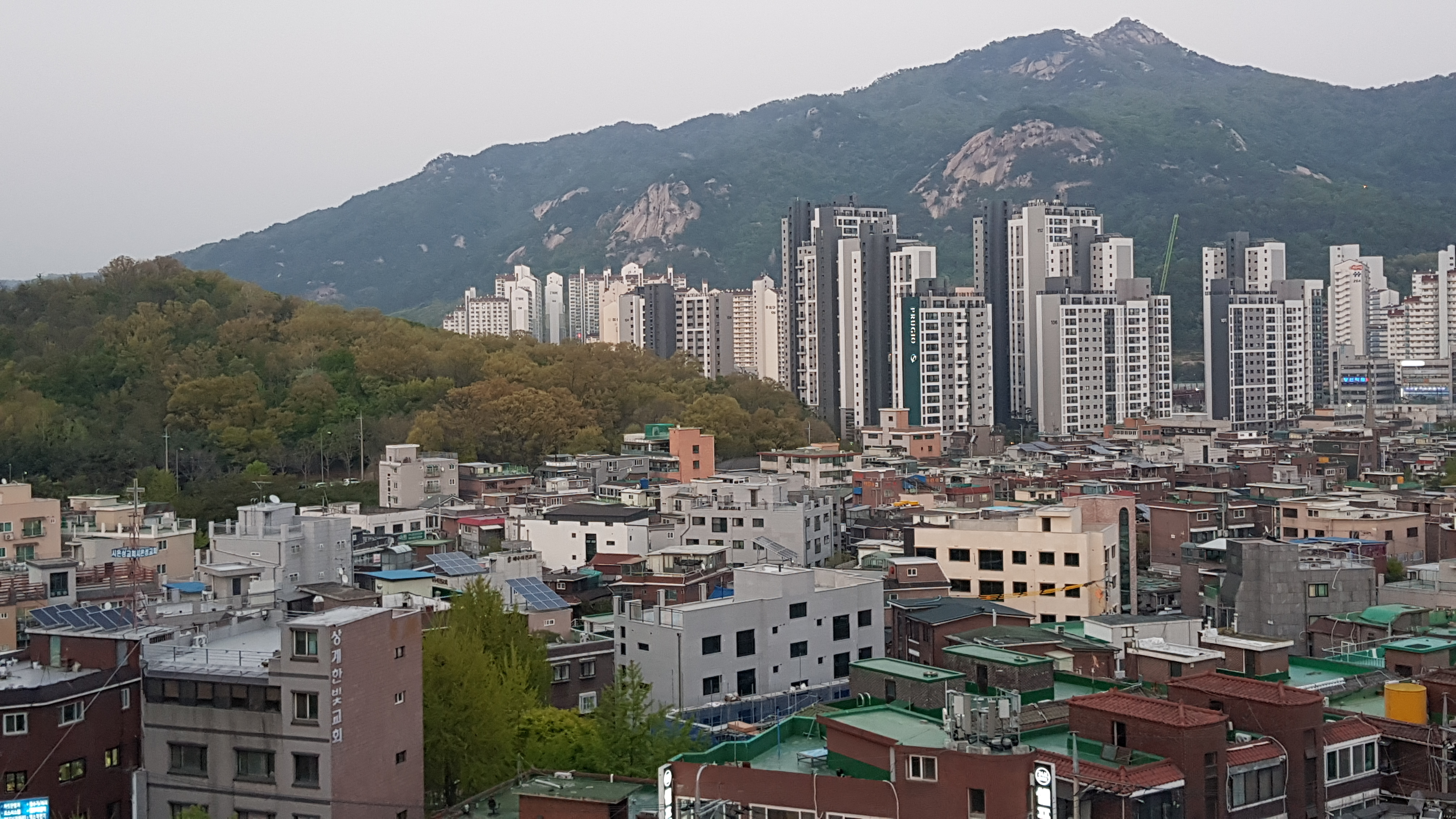
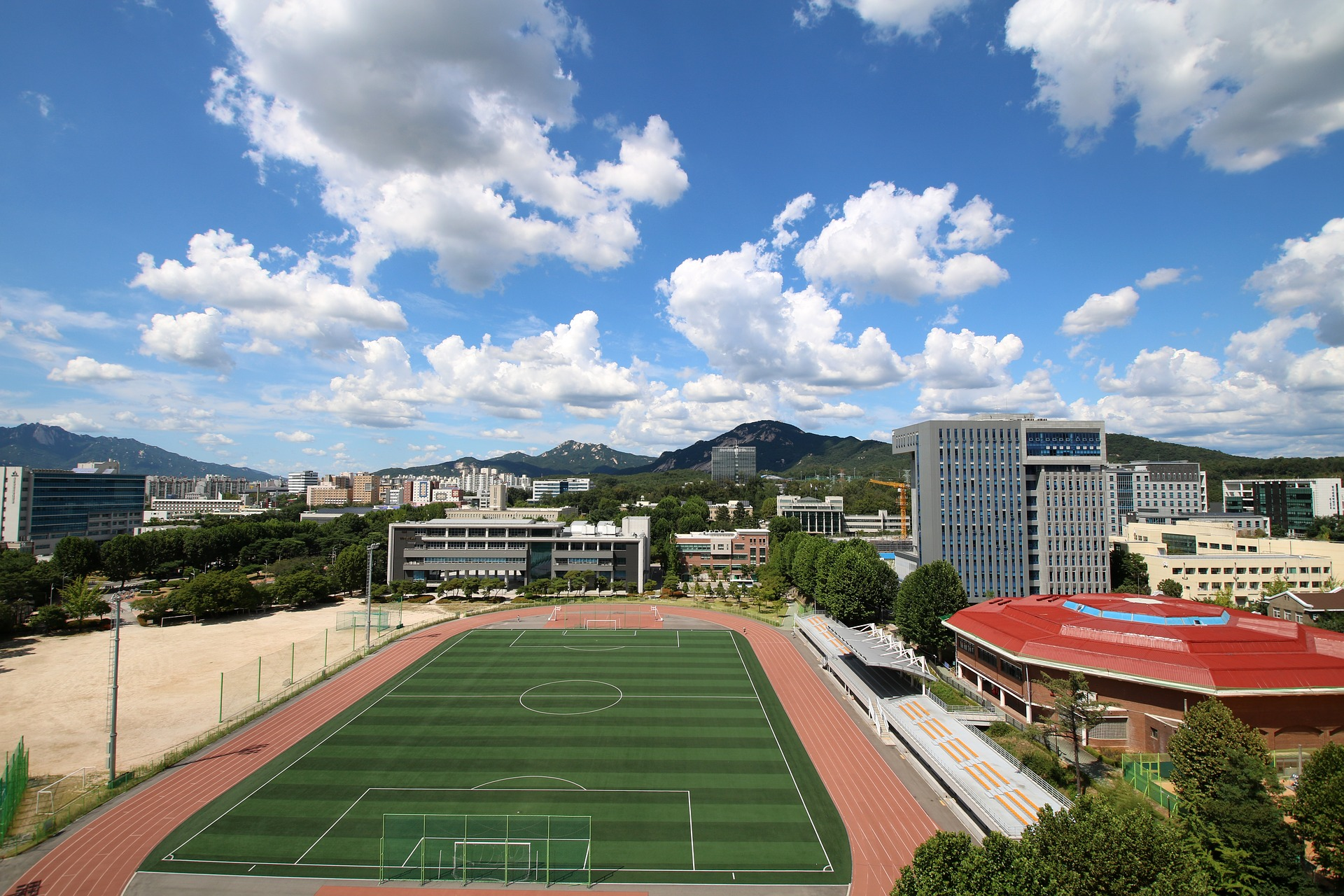
- Apartment buildings in Nowon-gu Hakdoam Nowon Cultural Street Seoul Science Center Sanggye 3, 4, 5 Dong Seoul National University of Technology

- Flag

- Location of Nowon District in Seoul
- Coordinates: 37°39′15.09″N 127°3′24.46″E
- Country: South Korea
- Region: Sudogwon
- Special City: Seoul
- Administrative dong: 22

Government
  - Body: Nowon District Council
  - Mayor: Seo Jun-o (Democratic)
  - MNAs: List of MNAs: Koh Yong-jin (Democratic); Woo Won-shik (Democratic); Kim Seong-hwan (Democratic)

Area
  - Total: 35.44 km^{2} (13.68 sq mi)

Population (2024)
  - Total: 492,544
  - Density: 13,900/km^{2} (36,000/sq mi)
- Time zone: UTC+9 (Korea Standard Time)
- Postal code: 01600~01999
- Area code: 02-9xx,2000~,340~369
- Website: Nowon District official website

Korean name
- Hangul: 노원구
- Hanja: 蘆原區
- RR: Nowon-gu
- MR: Nowŏn-gu

Nowon District (Korean: 노원구) is one of the 25 districts of Seoul, South Korea, located in the most northeastern part of the metropolitan city. It is considered to be a residental district, due to its high concentration of apartments and residental buildings. It has the highest population density in Seoul, with 619,509 people living in the area of 35.44 square kilometres (13.68 sq mi).

== Characteristics ==
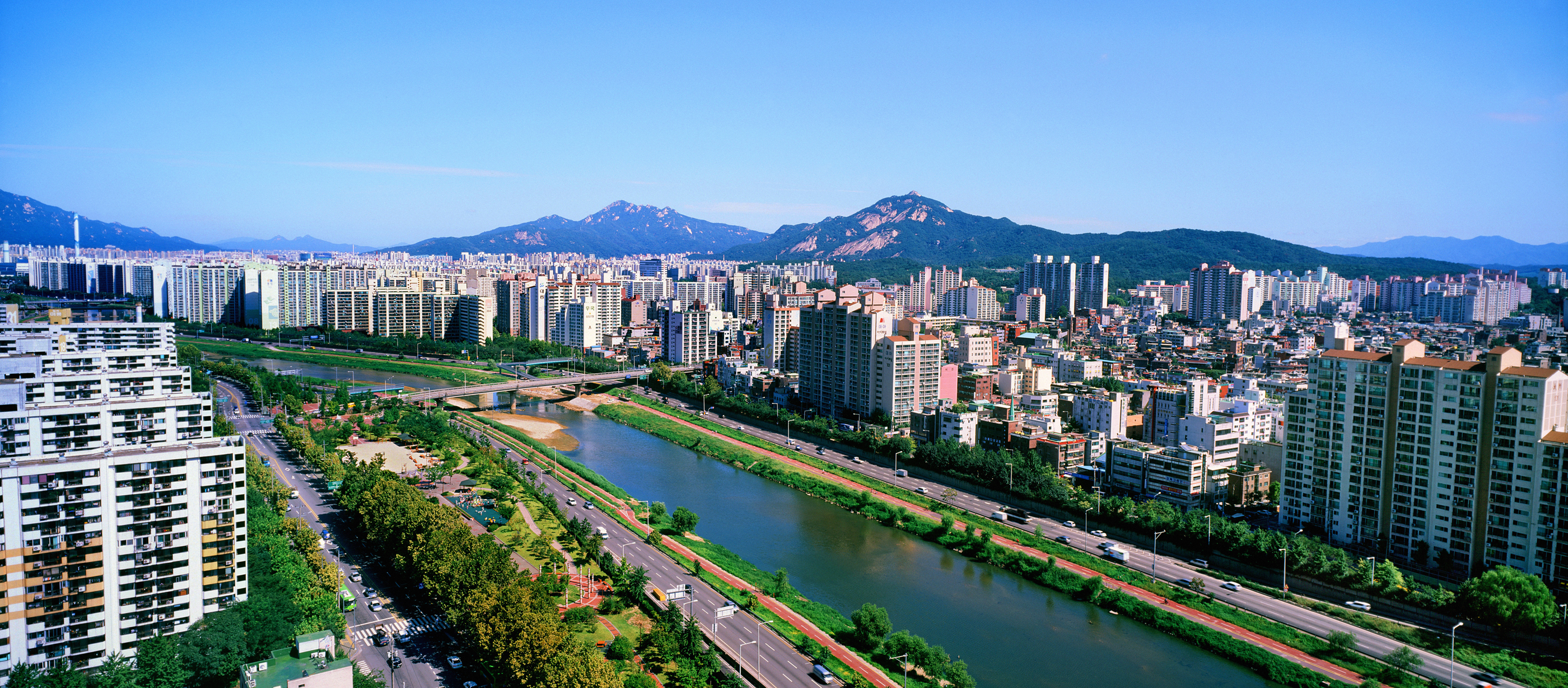
Panoramic view of Nowon District

Nowon District was formed in 1988 by splitting from Dobong District. The sixteen administrative neighborhoods comprising Dobong-dong, Chang-dong, Wolgye-dong, Gongneung-dong, Hagye-dong, Junggye-dong, and Sanggye-dong became a part of the new Nowon District. The following year, Dobong-dong and Chang-dong were returned to Dobong District.

Nowon District (and Seoul) is bordered by the mountains Suraksan and Bukhansan, on the northeast. The Jungnangcheon (or Jungnang Stream) flows through the western part of Nowon.

The Gyeongchun and Gyeongwon Lines of Korean National Railroad and the Seoul Metropolitan Subway lines four, six, and seven pass through Nowon District.

Nowon District is home to numerous educational institutes such as Kwangwoon University, Sahmyook University, the Korea Military Academy, Sejong Science High School, Seoul National University of Science and Technology, Induk University, and Seoul Women's University. The large number of schools, universities, and hagwon have given the "gu" the reputation of being the so-called "educational district" of northern Seoul, just like Gangnam and Seocho Districts of southern Seoul.

Kim Seong-hwan of the Democratic Party had been the mayor of the district from July 2010 to February 2018, when Kim resigned to run for the by-election of a National Assembly seat held in the district, which was vacated by Ahn Cheol-soo's resignation. Kim's bid was successful and the mayoral office is succeeded to Oh Seung-rok, also a member of Democratic Party.

In April 2013, multiplex cinema CGV Junggye opened in Junggye-dong. In 2019, the Seoul Urban Life Museum opened in the district.

== Symbols ==
- Tree: Ginkgo
- Bird: Eurasian collared dove
- Flower: Korean Azalea
- Animal: Horse
- Grass: Reed

== Administrative divisions ==
Administrative divisions

- Gongneung-dong (공릉동 孔陵洞) 1–2 (Both 1 and 3 administrative dongs are combined each other in January 2008)
- Hagye-dong (하계동 下溪洞) 1–2
- Junggye bon-dong (중계본동 中溪本洞)
- Junggye-dong (중계동 中溪洞) 1–4
- Sanggye-dong (상계동 上溪洞) 1–10 (3 and 4 administrative dongs were combined in January 2008)
- Wolgye-dong (월계동 月溪洞) 1–3

== Economy ==
The area around Nowon Station can be considered the central hub. Bank Intersection, on the other hand, is not classified as a main center because it is primarily a district filled with cram schools and serves mainly students, especially middle and high schoolers. When considering commercial and office districts as central areas, the vicinity around Nowon Station and Seokgye Station functions as major transportation hubs, while the area near Taereung Station, where the Northern District Prosecutors' Office and Northern District Court were located, can also be seen as a central area. (In fact, some consider the Nowon-Junggye-Hagye Station zone and the Seokgye-Taereung Entrance-Gongneung Station zone as the two main hubs of Nowon District.)

== Education ==
Schools and Universities in Nowon:

- Korea Military Academy
- Asia Pacific International School
- Seoul National University of Science and Technology
- Kwangwoon University
- Sahmyook University
- Seoul Women's University
- Induk University
- Korean Bible University

== Transportation ==
=== Railroad ===
- Korail

- Seoul Subway Line 1 (Gyeongwon Line)

(Dobong-gu) ← Wolgye — Kwangwoon University — Seokgye → (Seongbuk-gu)
- Gyeongchun Line (Kwangwoon University)

- Seoul Metro

- Seoul Subway Line 4

Danggogae — Sanggye — Nowon → (Dobong-gu)

- Seoul Subway Line 6

(Seongbuk-gu) ← Seokgye — Taereung — Hwarangdae → (Jungnang-gu)

- Seoul Subway Line 7

(Dobong-gu) ← Suraksan — Madeul — Nowon — Junggye — Hagye — Gongneung — Taereung → (Jungnang-gu)

== Sister cities ==
- Huaping, China
- Cairo, Egypt
- Milan, Italy

== Notable people ==
- Kim In-Seong, idol SF9 Member, Main Singer and YouTube personality
- Hahm Eun-jung, T-ara Member
- Cha Ye-ryun, actress
- Jung Ryeowon, Korean-Australian actor based in South Korea.
- Lee Jun-seok, South Korean politician who served as party leader of the conservative New Reform Party since January 2024.
- Eugene, S.E.S. member
- Kyuhyun, Super Junior member
- Lee Jung-jin, actor

== See also ==
- Jungwook Hong
