= Hapjeong-dong =

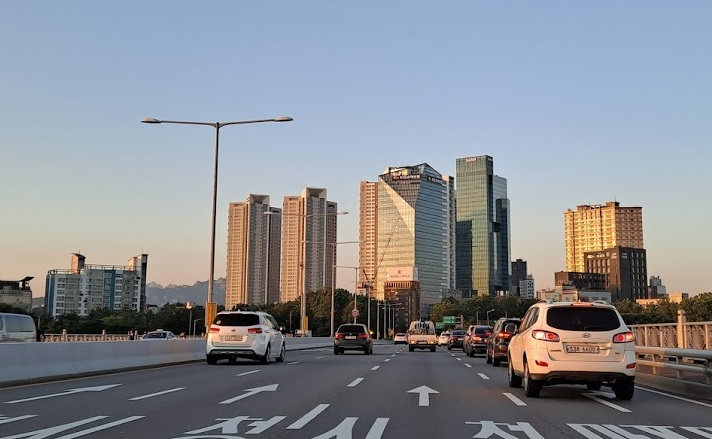
- View of Hapjeong-dong from Yanghwa Bridge
- Interactive map of Hapjeong-dong
- Coordinates: 37.54946°N 126.90566°E
- Country: South Korea
- Region: Sudogwon

Area
  - Total: 1.71 km^{2} (0.66 sq mi)

Population (2001)
  - Total: 23,408
  - Density: 13,700/km^{2} (35,500/sq mi)

Korean name
- Hangul: 합정동
- Hanja: 合井洞
- RR: Hapjeong-dong
- MR: Hapchŏng-dong

Hapjeong-dong (Korean: 합정동; Korean pronunciation: [hapt͈ɕʌŋdoŋ]) is a dong (neighborhood) of Mapo District, Seoul, South Korea.

== Etymology ==
Originally, Hapjeong-dong was a part of Yeonhui-bang, a division of Seoul that encompassed approximately Seodaemun District and the western part of Mapo District. The meaning of Hapjeong-dong, written in Hanja as 蛤井洞, was "clam well". Later the Hanja transcription of Hapjeong was changed to 合井.

After the Japan–Korea Annexation Treaty of 1910, Hapjeong-dong was known as Hapjeon-ri in 1913 and Hapjeong-jeong in 1936; it was a part of Yeonhui-myeon, which extended from Seodaemun District to Yeouido. In 1944, it became a part of the newly created Mapo District and received its current name in 1946.

== Streets ==
Hapjeong-dong contains the following main streets, which also give their name to surrounding, smaller streets according to the new address system in South Korea:

- Donggyo-ro separates Hapjeong-dong from Mangwon-dong;
- Dongmak-ro;
- Huiujeong-ro: the name of this street is the former name of Mangwonjeong, a pavilion built by his brother near the Han river;
- Poeun-ro: the name refers to the pen name of Chŏng Mong-ju, whose statue stands at one end of the street;
- Seonji-gil;
- Tojeong-ro;
- Yanghwajin-gil: the name refers to Yanghwagin, a former port and ferry dock on the Han riverside;
- Yanghwa-ro: leads to Yanghwa Bridge, near the former site of the Yanghwajin ferry dock;
- Worldcup-ro: leads to the Seoul World Cup Stadium and separates Hapjeong-dong from Seogyo-dong.

== Landmarks ==
A few historical landmarks may be found in Hapjeong-dong:

- Mangwonjeong was a pavilion built in 1424 by Prince Hyoryeong, elder brother of King Sejong, to oversee farming every spring and fall. Its first name, "Huiujeong" ("a pavilion meeting a delightful rain"), was given by King Sejong after seeing the field getting wet by rain during a visit. Later, Prince Wolsan, brother of King Seongjong, inherited the pavilion and renamed it "Mangwongeong". The pavilion was damaged by a flood in 1925 and rebuilt in 1989. Nowadays it is accessible from Donggyo-ro 8an-gil and oversees the Han river expressway.
- Yangwhajin was a port and ferry dock on the Han riverside, located near Jeoldu-san. It used to be an important entry point to Seoul.
- Jeoldu-san is a rocky promontory that oversees the Han river near the Dangsan Railway Bridge, with a shrine and park dedicated to Christian martyrs.
- Yanghwajin Foreigners' Cemetery, located near Jeoldu-san.

Other notable sites in Hapjeong-dong include:

- Yanghwa Bridge, that connects to Seonyu-do and the Han river south bank.
- the Seoul Thermal Power Station, also partly located in Dangin-dong.

A number of companies specialized in music or media are located in Hapjeong-dong, including YG Entertainment.

== Transport ==
The area is served by subway via Hapjeong station ( and), and Sangsu station. Also, various Seoul bus lines reach the street.

== See also ==
- Administrative divisions of South Korea
