= World Cup Stadium station (Seoul) =

Station of the Seoul Metropolitan Subway

Coordinates: 37°34′11″N 126°53′57″E

월드컵경기장 (성산); World Cup Stadium (Seongsan)
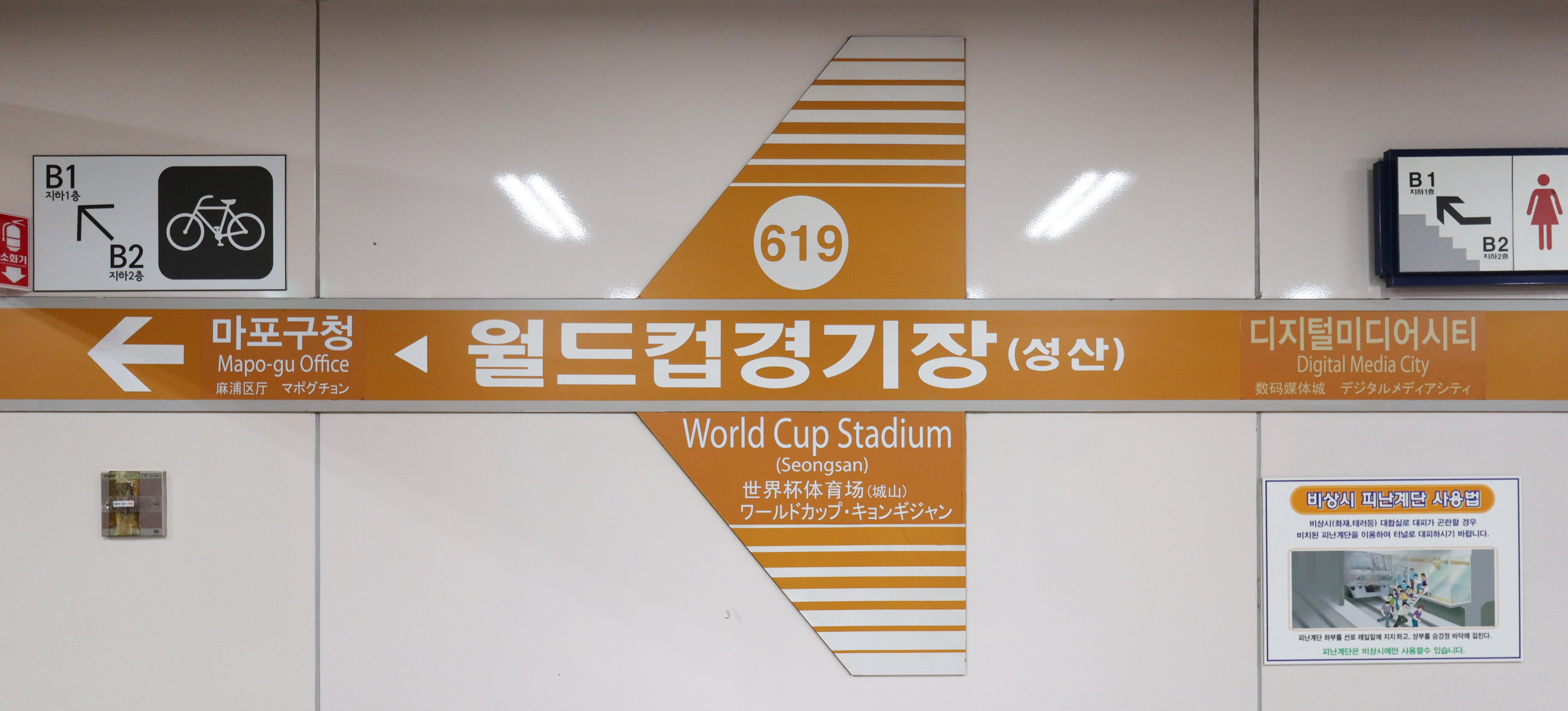

Korean name
- Hangul: 월드컵경기장역
- Hanja: 월드컵競技場驛
- Revised Romanization: Woldeukeop gyeonggijang-yeok
- McCune–Reischauer: Wŏldŭk'ŏp kyŏnggijang-yŏk

General information
- Location: 240 Woldeukeop-ro Jiha, 420 Seongsan 2-dong, Mapo-gu, Seoul
- Operator: Seoul Metro
- Line: Line 6
- Platforms: 2
- Tracks: 2

Construction
- Structure type: Underground

Key dates
- December 15, 2000: Line 6 opened
Location

World Cup Stadium station is a metropolitan subway station in Seoul, Korea. The station was built to facilitate access to the Seoul World Cup Stadium for 2002 FIFA World Cup. The station has a very specific design with a main entrance reminiscent of a Greek amphitheater, between Exits 2 and 3.

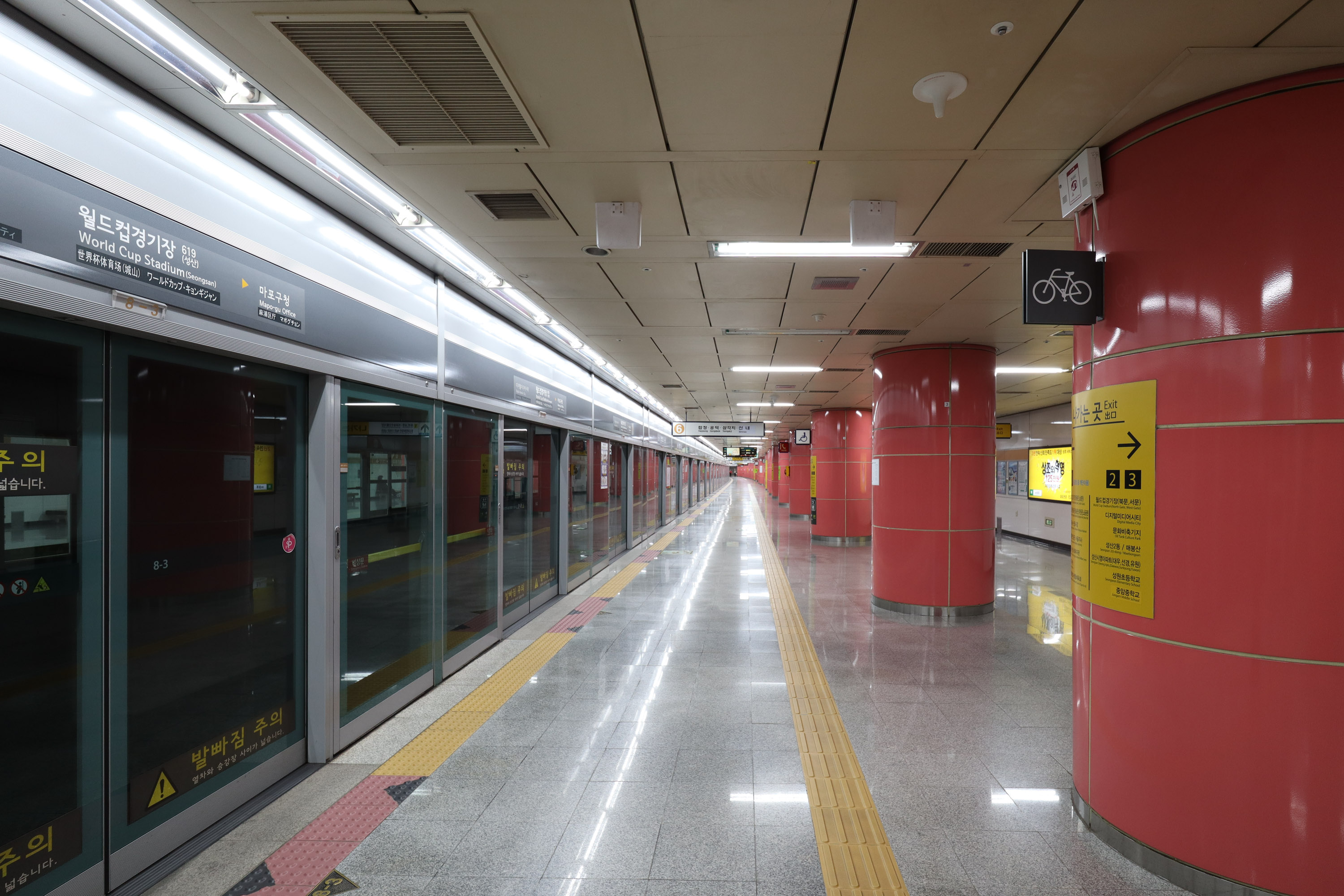
Platform

== Station layout ==
G	Street level	Exit

L1; Concourse	Lobby	Customer Service, Shops, Vending machines, ATMs

L2; Platform level	Side platform, doors will open on the right
L2; Platform level	Westbound	← Line 6 toward Eungam (Digital Media City)
L2; Platform level	Eastbound	Line 6 toward Sinnae (Mapo-gu Office) →
L2; Platform level	Side platform, doors will open on the right

== Vicinity ==
- Exit 1 : Seoul World Cup Stadium, Peace Park
- Exit 2 : Sangam Megabox
- Exit 3 :

Preceding station	Seoul Metropolitan Subway	Following station
Digital Media City towards Eungam	Line 6	Mapo-gu Office towards Sinnae
