= Mapo-gu Office station =

Train station in Seoul, South Korea

Coordinates: 37°33′50″N 126°54′11″E

마포구청; Mapo-gu Office
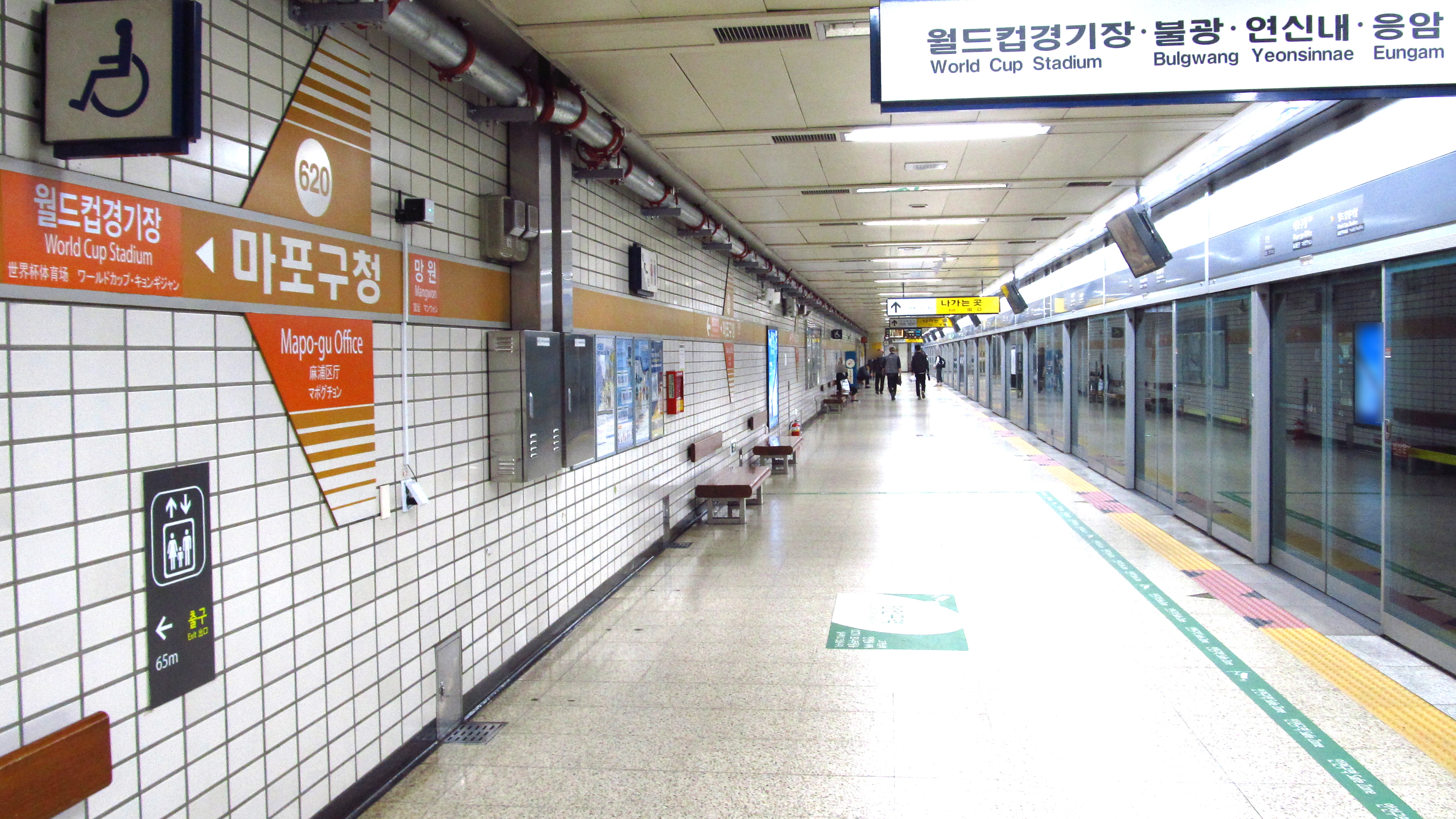
- The platform at Mapo-gu Office station in 2019

Korean name
- Hangul: 마포구청역
- Hanja: 麻浦區廳驛
- Revised Romanization: Mapogucheong-yeok
- McCune–Reischauer: Map'oguch'ŏng-yŏk

General information
- Location: 592 Seongsan-dong, 190 Weoldeukeop-ro Jiha, Mapo-gu, Seoul
- Operated by: Seoul Metro
- Line(s): Line 6
- Platforms: 2
- Tracks: 2

Construction
- Structure type: Underground

Key dates
- December 15, 2000: Line 6 opened

Mapo-gu Office Station is a Seoul Metropolitan Subway station near the Mapo district office in Seoul, opened in December 2000.

== Station layout ==
G	Street level	Exit

L1; Concourse	Lobby	Customer Service, Shops, Vending machines, ATMs

L2; Platform level	Side platform, doors will open on the right
L2; Platform level	Westbound	← Line 6 toward Eungam (World Cup Stadium)
L2; Platform level	Eastbound	Line 6 toward Sinnae (Mangwon) →
L2; Platform level	Side platform, doors will open on the right

== Exits ==
- Exit 1 : Seoul Traffic & Safe public corporation, Sinbuk elementary school, Sungsan 2dong town office, Ways to Gyeryong, Daerim, Sungsan Siyoung, Sewon, Iaan apartment complex, Southern part of Seoul World Cup
- Exit 2 : Sungsan 2 dong, Benz-Hanseong vehicles (service center), several apartment complex.
- Exit 3 : Mapo gu office, Seongsu middle school, Seongsan 1dong office
- Exit 5 : Hapjeong-no, Worldcup market
- Exit 6 : Mangwon 2 police center, Mangwon elementary school
- Exit 7 : Seongsanno, Civil park of Han River

Preceding station	Seoul Metropolitan Subway	Following station
World Cup Stadium towards Eungam	Line 6	Mangwon towards Sinnae
