= Mangwon station =

Train station in South Korea

망원; Mangwon
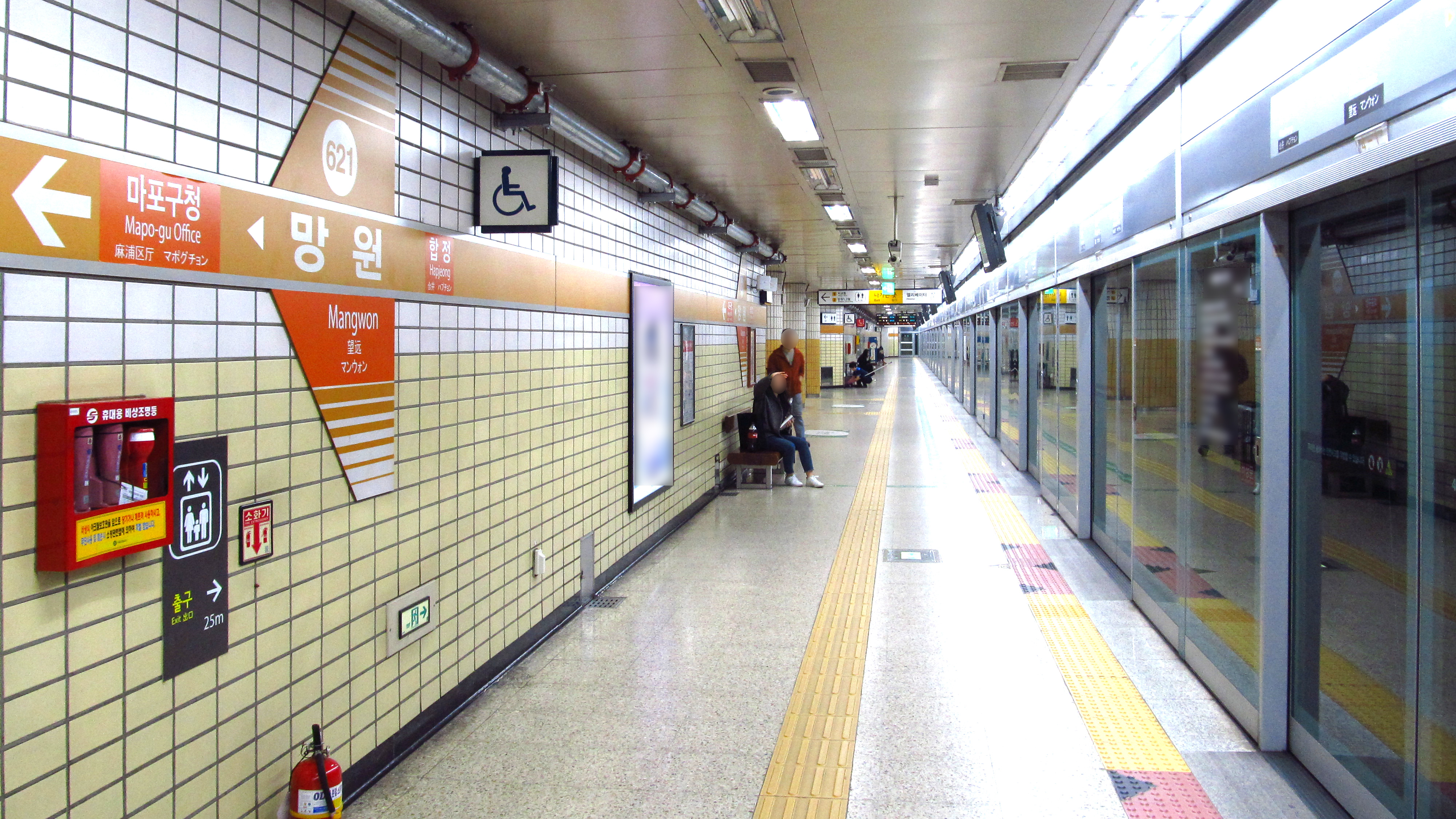
- Station platform

Korean name
- Hangul: 망원역
- Hanja: 望遠驛
- Revised Romanization: Mangwonnyeok
- McCune–Reischauer: Mangwŏnnyŏk

General information
- Location: 77 Woldeukeop-ro Jiha, 378 Mangwon 1-dong, Mapo-gu, Seoul
- Coordinates: 37°33′22″N 126°54′36″E
- Operated by: Seoul Metro
- Line(s): Line 6
- Platforms: 2
- Tracks: 2

Construction
- Structure type: Underground

History
- Opened: 15 December 2000

Services
Preceding station	Seoul Metropolitan Subway	Following station
Mapo-gu Office towards Eungam	Line 6	Hapjeong towards Sinnae

Mangwon station is a railway station on Line 6 of the Seoul Subway in Mapo-gu, Seoul.

== Station layout ==
G	Street level	Exit

L1; Concourse	Lobby	Customer Service, Shops, Vending machines, ATMs

L2; Platform level	Side platform, doors will open on the right
L2; Platform level	Westbound	← Line 6 toward Eungam (Mapo-gu Office)
L2; Platform level	Eastbound	Line 6 toward Sinnae (Hapjeong) →
L2; Platform level	Side platform, doors will open on the right

== Exits ==
- Exit 1 : Seongseo Elementary School
- Exit 2 : Seongsan Elementary School, Donggyo Elementary School
