= Hapjeong station =

Subway station in Seoul

Coordinates: 37°32′57″N 126°54′49″E

합정 (세아타워); Hapjeong (SeAH Tower)
합정 (세아타워); Hapjeong (SeAH Tower)
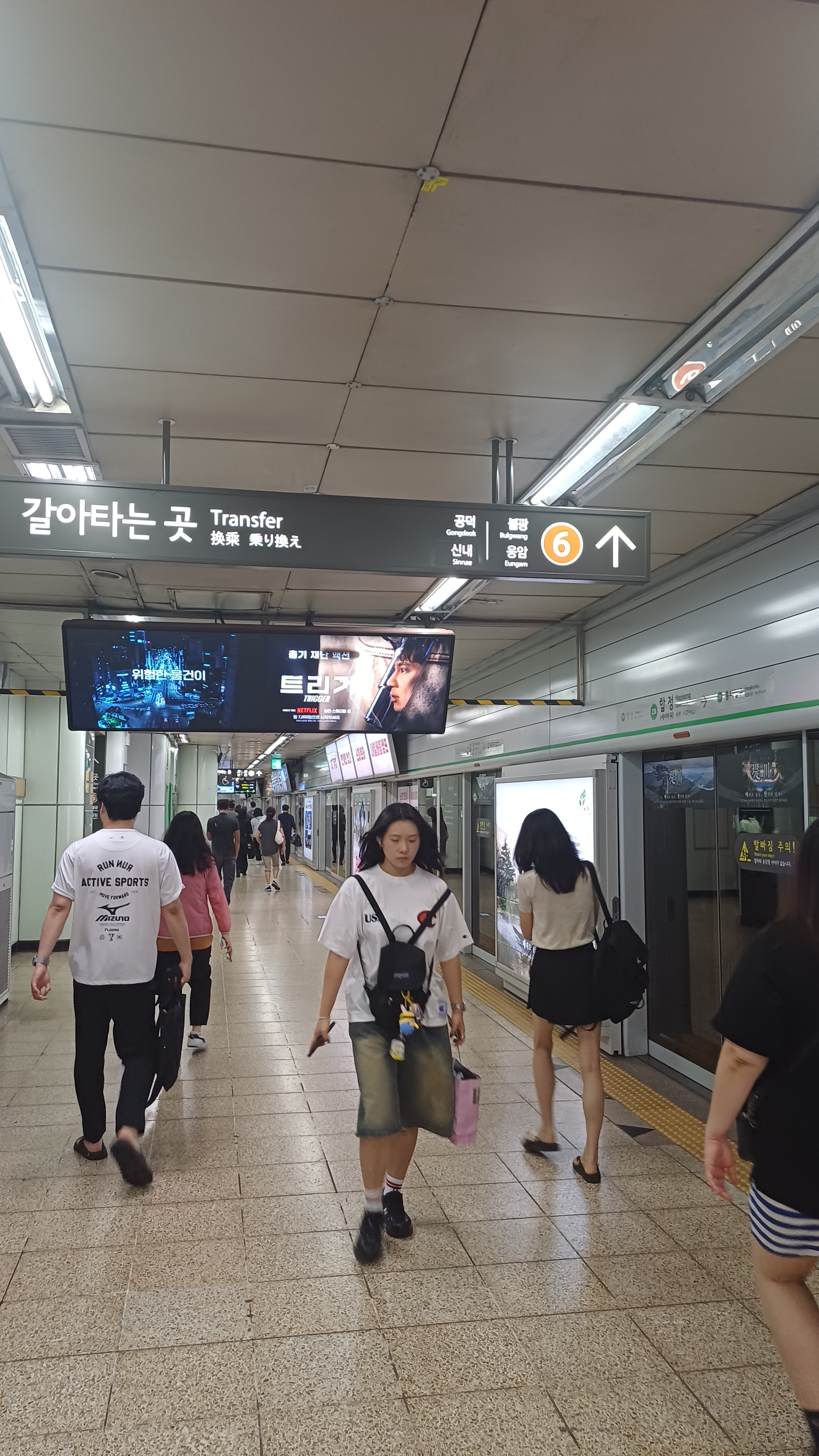
- Line 2 platform

Korean name
- Hangul: 합정역
- Hanja: 合井驛
- Revised Romanization: Hapjeong-yeok
- McCune–Reischauer: Hapchŏng-yŏk

General information
- Location: 55 Yanghwa-ro Jiha, 393 Seogyo-dong, Mapo-gu, Seoul
- Operator: Seoul Metro
- Lines: Line 2 Line 6
- Platforms: 4
- Tracks: 4

Construction
- Structure type: Underground

Key dates
- 22 May 1984: Line 2 opened
- 15 December 2000: Line 6 opened

Services
Preceding station	Seoul Metropolitan Subway	Following station
Dangsan Next counterclockwise	Line 2	Hongik University Next clockwise
Mangwon towards Eungam	Line 6	Sangsu towards Sinnae
Location

Hapjeong Station (Korean: 합정역; Korean pronunciation: [hapt͈ɕʌŋ]) is an underground station of Seoul Subway Line 2 and Seoul Subway Line 6. The station is located just north of the Han River in Mapo District. The name of the subway station comes from its local name. The name of the area means clam well.

The station is the southern end of Hongdae area, which is the centre of urban arts and indie music culture of Seoul. It is closest to the historical site of Jeoldu-san, a place where over 10,000 Koreans of the Roman Catholic faith were beheaded in 1866 under the orders of Daewon-gun. Yanghwajin Foreigners' Cemetery and the Holt International Children's Services are also located near the station. The northern end of Yanghwa Bridge is near the gates of the station.

== Trivia ==
The song "Hapjeong Station Exit 5" (합정역 5번 출구), by Yoo Jae-suk, is about a pair of lovers who meet at Hapjeong station for the last time before breaking up.

== Gallery ==
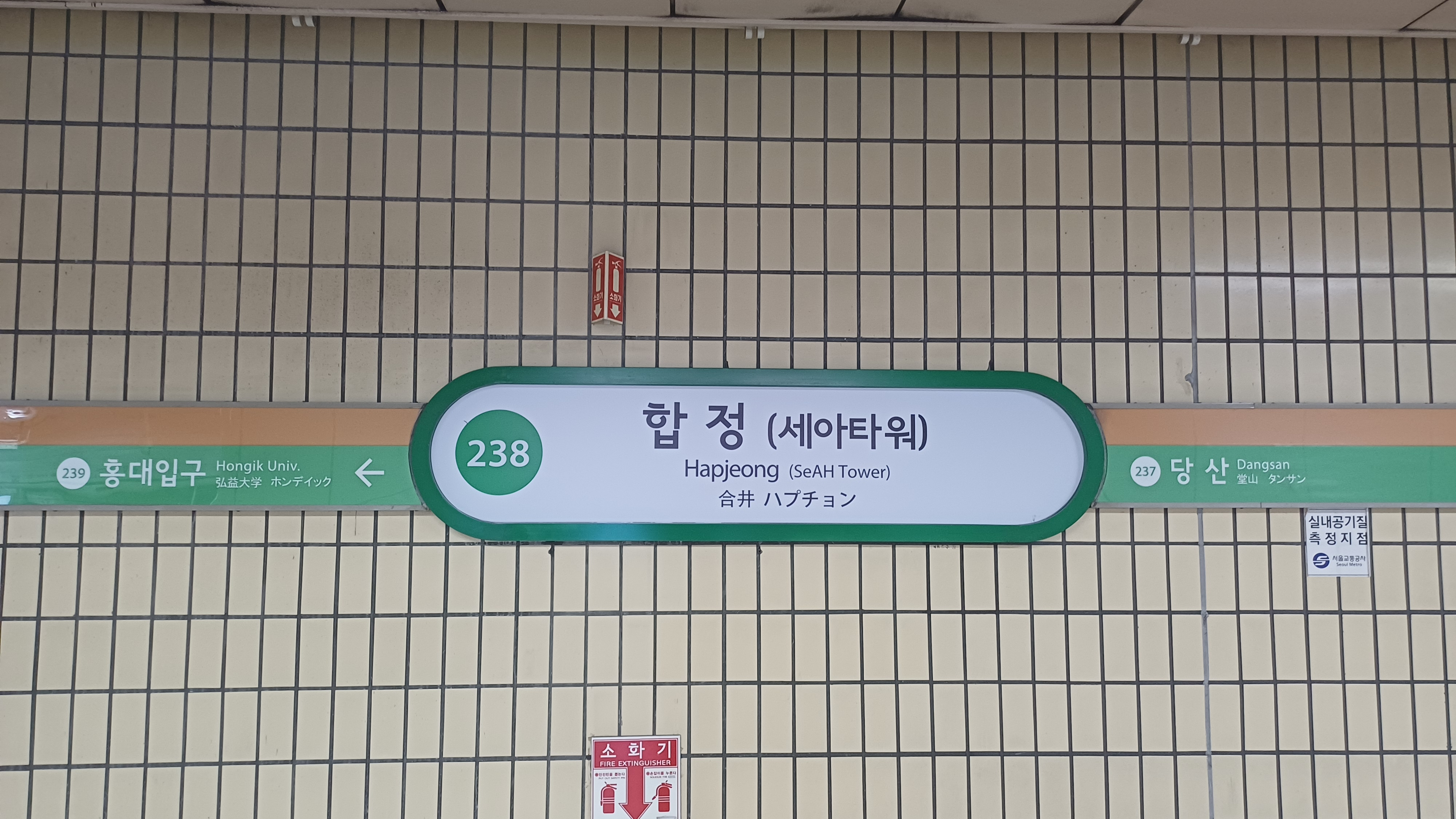
Station sign (Line 2)

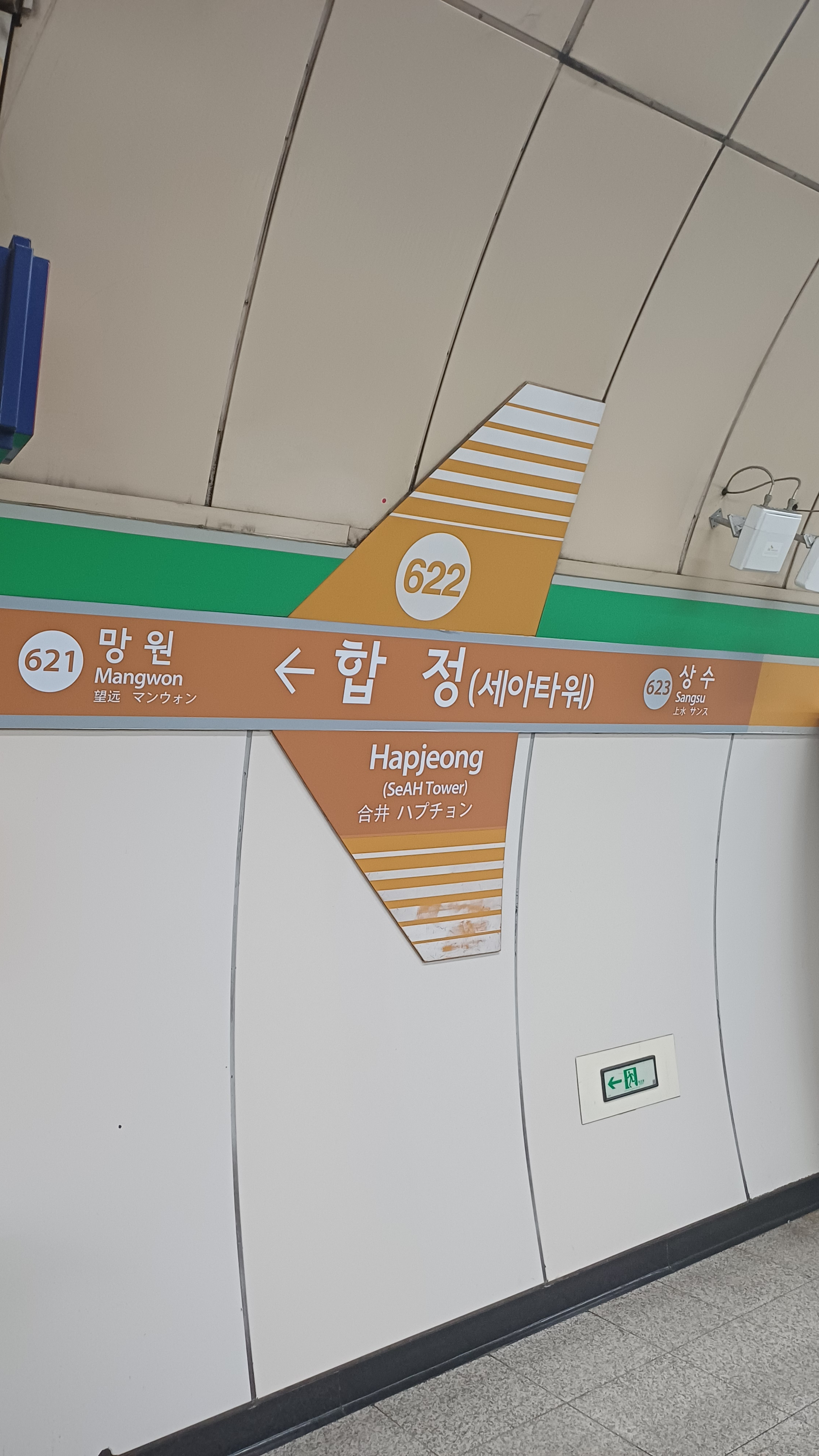
Station sign (Line 6)

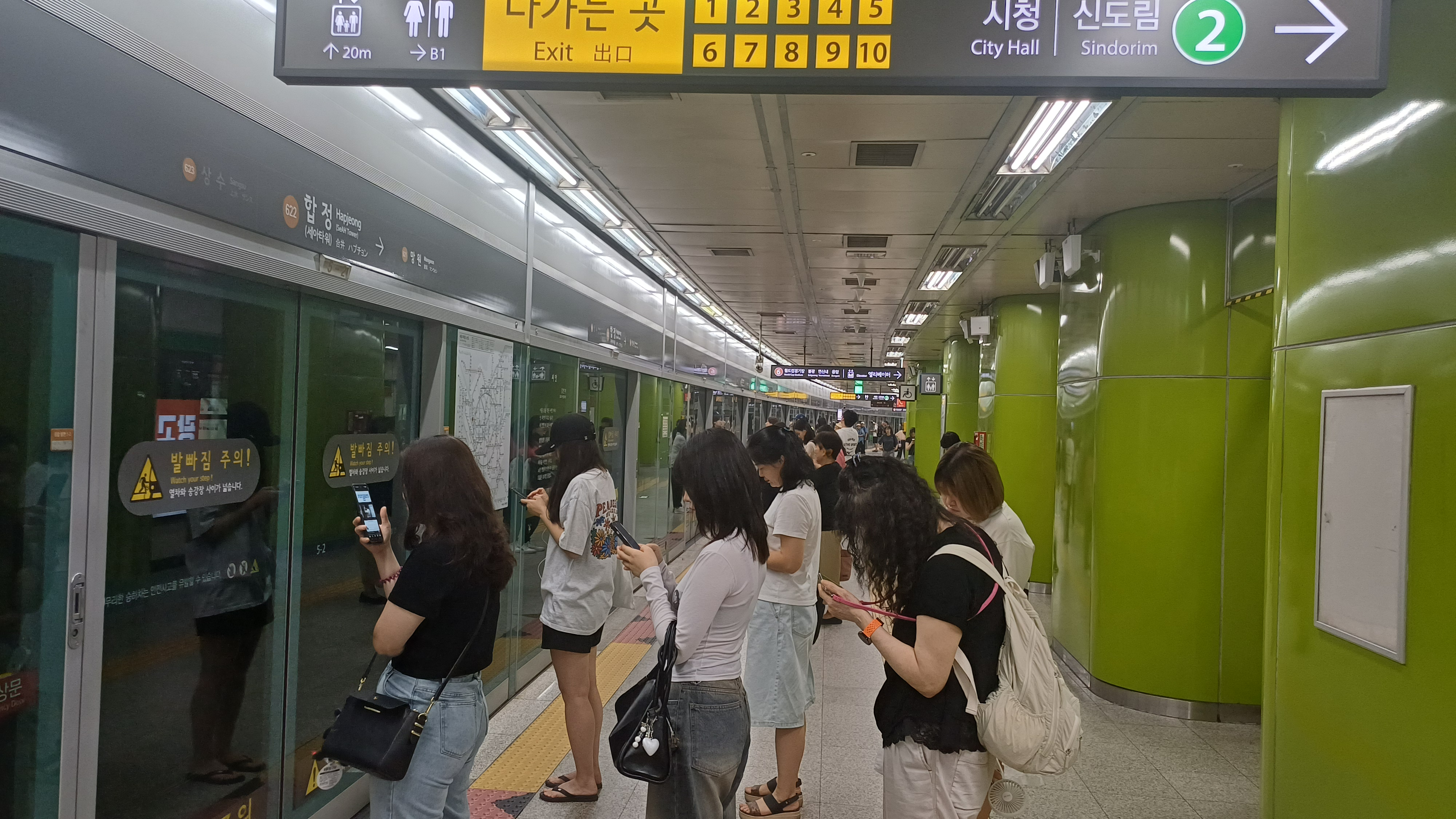
Line 6 platform
