= Yanghwajin Foreign Missionary Cemetery =

Cemetery in Seoul, South Korea

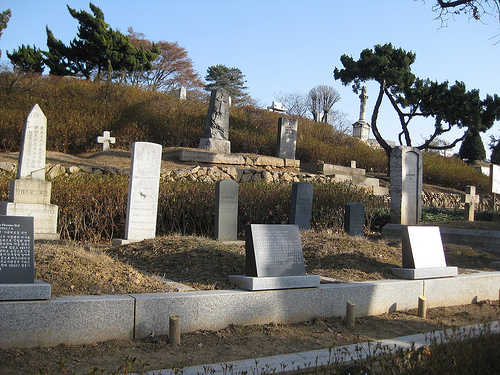
- Interactive map of Yanghwajin Foreign Missionary Cemetery

Details
- Established: 1890
- Location: Hapjeong-dong, Mapo-gu, Seoul (Public transit: line #2 Hapjeong Station exit #7, 10 minute walk away)
- Country: South Korea
- Coordinates: 37°32′48″N 126°54′40″E
- Website: www.yanghwajin.net
- Find a Grave: Yanghwajin Foreign Missionary Cemetery

Korean name
- Hangul: 양화진 외국인 선교사 묘원
- Hanja: 楊花津 外國人 宣敎師 墓園
- RR: Yanghwajin oegugin seongyosa myowon
- MR: Yanghwajin oegugin sŏn'gyosa myowŏn

Yanghwajin Foreign Missionary Cemetery (Korean: 양화진외국인선교사묘원), also known as the Hapjeong-dong International Cemetery, is a cemetery overlooking the Han River in the district of Mapo District, Seoul, South Korea.

The cemetery was first opened in 1890, and contains at least 376 graves: around 118 of which belong to foreign missionaries and their family members. The cemetery survived the 1910–1945 Japanese colonial period and the 1950–1953 Korean War, and is remembered as a historic site for Korea's interactions with the West and Christianity.

== History ==
The creation of the cemetery was motivated by the death of Presbyterian minister John W. Heron on July 26, 1890. At the time, foreigners were not permitted to be buried in Seoul proper. The Korean government coordinated with the small foreigner community to find a plot of land suitable for burials. Horace Newton Allen obtained the land rights of the bluff overlooking the Han River.

During the 1950–1953 Korean War, damage occurred to a number of the grave markers; this damage is still visible.

=== Ownership and maintenance controversy ===
In 1956, the Kyungsung European-American Cemetery Association, an organization linked to Seoul Union Church, was granted management rights to the cemetery by the government. However, ownership of the land was reportedly not officially registered. In 1961, President Park Chung Hee decreed that foreigners in South Korea were not allowed to own land. The grounds technically belonged to no one until the city of Seoul designated it a public park in 1965.

In 1985, Horace Grant Underwood III, on behalf of Seoul Union Church, requested that a Korean organization called the Council for the 100th Anniversary of the Korean Church (henceforth "100th Anniversary Church") register the cemetery on behalf of the Seoul Union Church. The two churches reportedly agreed that Seoul Union Church would be the unofficial caretakers of the land. A year later, they built a chapel nearby called the Memorial Chapel: this served as the first permanent home for Seoul Union Church. In 1979, the South Korean government expropriated a portion of the land for a construction project.

Relations between the two groups were reportedly amicable until Underwood's death in 2004. In 2005, the 100th Anniversary Church began sharing Memorial Chapel with Seoul Union Church in 2005. In addition, the 100th Anniversary Church reportedly informed Union Church that it would be taking over management of the facility, as they were the legal owners. Tensions reportedly rose, with both groups publicly accusing the other of misconduct. The 100th Anniversary Church alleged the Union Church was not taking adequate care of the cemetery and had been blocking sharing of the Memorial Chapel, and the Union Church criticized the 100th Anniversary Church's practice of using the pathways in the cemetery as excess parking spaces for the congregation, as well as going back on the good faith agreements between the groups. The 100th Anniversary Church reportedly increasingly escalated active management over both the building and cemetery over time. In a spring 2007 meeting, they reportedly informed Union Church that they were no longer in charge of maintaining the cemetery. On August 5, 2007, the Seoul Union Church congregation was locked out of Memorial Chapel. The 100th Anniversary Church reportedly compared the expulsion to the 1997 Handover of Hong Kong, where foreign-occupied territory was returned to the original owner. Concurrently, they denied charges that the expulsion was motivated by nationalism.

== Statistics ==
Estimated interments
Burials	Adults	Children	Total
Missionary community	83	38	118
Non-missionary, non-military	53	15	66
U.S. military-related	26	38	64
Unknown	44	31	75
Koreans	12	11 (Note: These figures do not include the 23 known unmarked graves or the unknown number of Korean children from the Anglican orphanages buried on upper slope of the Anglican plot.)	23
Totals	221	133	376

== Notable interments ==
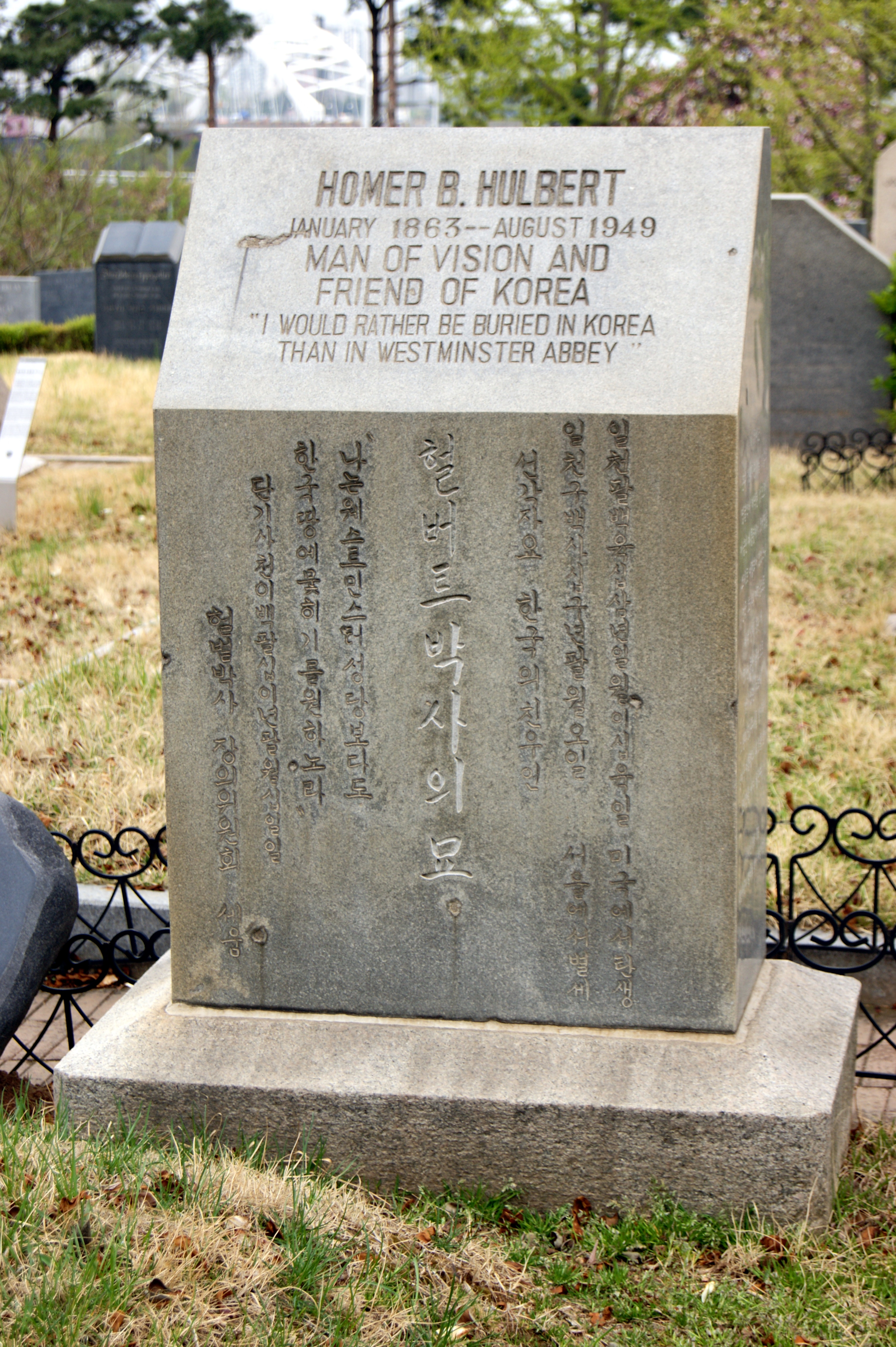
Homer Hulbert's Tombstone

- Homer Hulbert (1863–1949) American missionary and journalist whose headstone proclaims "I would rather be buried in Korea than in Westminster Abbey."
- Ernest Bethell (1872–1909) British journalist, Korean independence activist, and founder of The Korea Daily News.
- Horace Grant Underwood (1859–1916) founder of the Seoul YMCA, Saemunan Presbyterian Church and what eventually became Yonsei University
- Henry Gerhard Appenzeller (1858–1902) (cenotaph) who greatly contributed to the foundation of Pai Chai University
- Rosetta Sherwood Hall (1865–1951), medical missionary and founder of the Pyongyang School for the Deaf and Blind, Baldwin Dispensary (Lilian Harris Memorial Hospital). Instrumental in the founding of the Hall Memorial Hospital (Pyongyang).
- William James Hall, (1860–1894), medical missionary and namesake of Hall Memorial Hospital (Pyongyang).
- Clarence Ridgley Greathouse (1843–1899) supervisor to 1895 trial of the murder of Queen Min
- Brevet Brigadier General Charles W. Le Gendre (1830–1899) French-born American general, diplomat and advisor to King Kojong from 1890 to 1899.
- Soda Kaichi (1867-1962) and his wife Takiko Kaichi (1878-1950) Japanese missionary husband and wife. He and his wife Takiko were the only Japanese people to be buried in the cemetery in 1962.
