= Seoul Girls' High School =

Seoul Girls' High School 서울여자고등학교

Location
- 34 Baekbeom-ro 25-gil, Mapo-gu; Seoul; South Korea
- Coordinates: 37.5478116°N 126.9485819°E

Information
- Type: Public
- Principal: Yang Shin Ho (양신호)
- Gender: Girls
- Enrolment: 914
- Website: http://seoulgs.hs.kr/

Seoul Girls' High School (서울여자고등학교) is a high school located in Yeomni-dong, Mapo district, Seoul. It was established in 1958 as Mapo Girls' High School, and took its present name in 1960. The school was divided into separate junior high and high schools in 1968.

== Notable alumni ==
- Chae Ri-na
- Lee Hae-ri
- Lee Hye-sook
- Na Kyung-won
- Won Mi-kyung
- Bae Hae-sun
