= Clarence Ridgley Greathouse =

American diplomat (1846–1899)

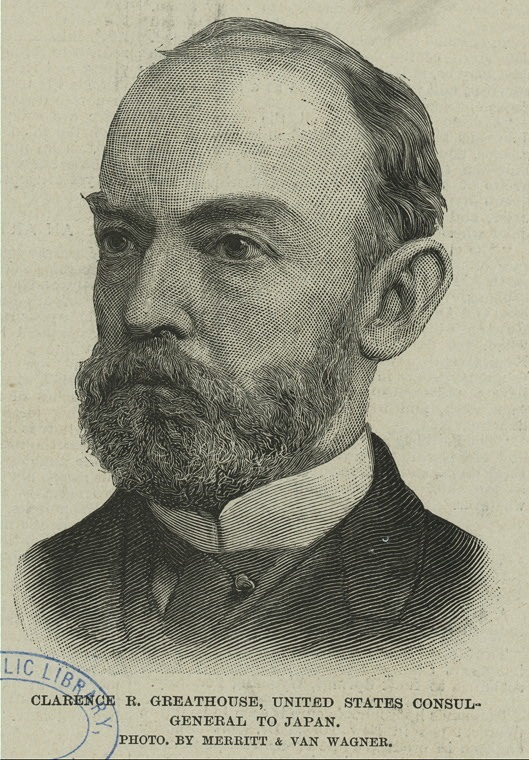
Greathouse during his tenure as United States Consul at Yokohama (ca. 1890)

Clarence Ridgley Greathouse (September 17, 1846 – October 21, 1899) was an American journalist, lawyer, and diplomat serving in Japan and Korea. In Korea he was most renowned for leading the investigation into the murder of that country's Queen Min in October 1895.

Clarence Ridgley Greathouse was born in Kentucky, the son of Dr. Ridgley Greathouse, who emigrated to California. In 1870 Clarence Greathouse moved to San Francisco to practice law. There he also became active in local Democratic politics and in 1883 was named general manager of the Democratic daily the San Francisco Examiner, a position he held until 1886 when he was appointed United States consul-general at Yokohama, Japan. He served successfully at this post for four years, from 1886 to 1890. Meanwhile, in Korea successive American representatives in the Korean capital of Seoul had succeeded in impressing Korea's King Gojong with the friendly and disinterested nature of the policy of the American government that he was led to secure a comparatively large number of American advisors. Thus, in September 1890, Greathouse was engaged to serve as legal advisor to the Korean government. At that time there were eight other Americans already serving in Seoul in various advisory capacities, a reality that displeased the Chinese. But despite positive suggestions by the Chinese Resident Yuan Shikai against the employment of further foreign advisors, on January 3, 1891, the Korean government named Greathouse a vice-president of the home office, granting him charge of matters pertaining to foreign legal affairs. General Legendre at this time was a vice-president of the same office as foreign advisor to the king. Greathouse's legal knowledge was often called upon in the drafting of conventions, in the constant negotiations with foreign representatives in Seoul, and in the revising of Korean law and the reorganizing, at least on paper, of the Korean judicial system.

The best-known work of Greathouse was in connection with the trial of the Koreans implicated in the murder of the Queen of Korea by Japanese and Korean conspirators on October 8, 1895. After the king had escaped from his Japanese and Korean captors to the safety of the Russian legation, he asked Greathouse to supervise the investigation into the circumstances surrounding the death of the Queen. Greathouse attended all sessions of the court, examined the witnesses, and had the trials conducted in a thoroughly modern manner. It was owing to his influence that the trials were free from the gross faults which customarily disfigured the proceedings of all Korean courts, and that for general approximation to Western notions of justice and integrity they were in every way remarkable. During the last few years of his life Greathouse acted as confidential advisor to the King on foreign affairs. As far as the records show, he was never married; his mother remained with him until his death. While he was in Japan he secured the services of a young Goan, H. A. Dos Remedios, as his secretary. When he went to Korea he took his assistant with him and Dos Remedios came practically to occupy the position of son as well as secretary, although he was never officially adopted. Greathouse died in Seoul on October 21, 1899, while still in the service of the government of Korea. He is buried in the Yanghwajin Foreigners' Cemetery in central Seoul.
