= Soda Kaichi =

Japanese social worker and missionary (1867–1962)

- 曽田 嘉伊智
- Born: October 20, 1867; Yamaguchi Prefecture, Empire of Japan
- Died: March 28, 1962 (aged 94); Youngnak Borinwon, Seoul, South Korea
- Burial place: Yanghwajin Foreign Missionary Cemetery
- Occupation(s): Protestant missionary, social worker
- Known for: Caring for over 1,000 Korean orphans
- Awards: Order of Cultural Merit

Soda Kaichi (曽田 嘉伊智; October 20, 1867 – March 28, 1962) was a Japanese Protestant missionary and social worker. He is remembered in South Korea for his charitable work in Korea under Japanese rule, particularly through the Kamakura Orphanage (鎌倉保育園; now Youngnak Borinwon), which he led from 1921 to 1945. During this time, he cared for more than a thousand Korean orphans.

He and his wife are the only Japanese people to be buried in Yanghwajin Foreign Missionary Cemetery, now in Seoul, South Korea.

== Early life ==
Soda was born on October 20, 1867, in Yamaguchi Prefecture, Empire of Japan. In his youth, he worked a variety of jobs. At age 20, he moved to Nagasaki and worked as a coal miner and then elementary school teacher. He then became a sailor on a Norwegian cargo ship. After Japan's victory in the First Sino-Japanese War and its acquisition of Taiwan, he moved to Taiwan and worked in a German-run factory. He also visited Hong Kong and China; during his travels he reportedly met and was inspired by Chinese revolutionary Sun Yat-sen.

Soda professed to being a heavy drinker around this time. In 1899, he fell over while drunk on a street in Taiwan. Most people ignored him lying there, and his position put him at risk of physical harm. A Korean took pity on him and brought him to an inn. The Korean paid for his meal, took care of him, and then disappeared without telling Soda his name. Soda, moved by this experience, reportedly resolved to help others. He moved to Korea in June 1905 to help the country of his benefactor.

== Activities in Korea ==
In Korea, Soda began teaching the Japanese language at the Hwangsŏng Christian Youth Association (now the YMCA Korea). While there, he met and was inspired by Yi Sangjae. He then converted to Protestant Christianity and began practicing and advocating for temperance. He reportedly befriended prominent Korean activists at the YMCA, including the future President of South Korea Syngman Rhee. In 1909, he married his wife Ueno Takiko (上野瀧子), who taught English at Sookmyung Girls' High School and Ewha Girls' High School.

In 1911, during the outbreak of the 105-Man Incident, several of Soda's colleagues at the YMCA were arrested by the colonial government. Soda petitioned their release to the Governor-General of Chōsen Terauchi Masatake and the Japanese court in Korea. In 1913, he founded the Keijō (Seoul) branch of the Kamakura Orphanage. The orphanage was among the first of its kind in Korea. During the 1919 March First Movement protests, he provided medical aid to and advocated for the release of Korean protestors. In 1939, he began renting land in Huam-dong, which became the current site of the Youngnak Borinwon.

Soda's sympathetic leanings to Korea invited scrutiny from other Japanese people, who reportedly viewed him as a traitor. He was reportedly mocked and called an embarrassment by other Japanese people. He and his wife received poor treatment from Japanese authorities; he was once arrested because a child in the orphanage had participated in the Korean independence movement. He also received criticism from some Koreans, who viewed him as a potential spy for the Japanese Empire. Other Koreans recognized his efforts and defended him. According to one anecdote, while struggling with funds for the orphanage, he once found a bundle that was anonymously left for him. The bundle contained a large sum of 1,000 yen and a note that read: (Note: "동포들을 대신하여 감사드립니다. 저는 사정이 있어 국외로 나갑니다. 저는 도둑놈이 아닙니다. 이 돈을 고아들을 위해 써주십시오.")

Thank you on behalf of my compatriots. I am about to go abroad. I am not a thief. Please use this money on the orphans.

In 1943, Soda was invited to a Japanese church in Wonsan, Kankyōnan-dō (South Hamgyong Province). He left his wife in charge of Kamakura and went to the church. Soda was there during the 1945 liberation of Korea. Upon the liberation, some angered Koreans took revenge against Japanese people. Japanese people fled to the church for safety. The local Koreans, knowing and trusting Soda, reportedly left the church alone. Soviet troops began to occupy the northern half of the peninsula, and began applying pressure to close the church. In October 1947, Soda led the Japanese community in Wonsan to Seoul and began arranging for their return to Japan. Upon his departure, he gave a statement to a newspaper:

Korea and Japan will one day be friends. There are 700 to 800 Japanese women married to Koreans in Keijō alone. I hope Japanese people will understand the 600,000 Koreans in Japan better. (Note: "한·일 친선은 이루어질 것이다. 경성에만 한국인과 결혼한 여성이 700~800명이다. 재일 한국인 60만명에 대해서도 일본인은 조금 더 올바르게 이해하기 바란다.")

Soda's wife remained in Korea to care for the orphans. She would eventually die at the age of 72 in January 1950; as Korea and Japan had no diplomatic relations at the time, Soda was unable to visit her grave in Korea.

== Later life ==
Upon his return to Japan, Soda began touring Japan, while evangelizing. He was invited to become a pastor on the island Shōdoshima, in a small church in a small village. He accepted the offer and reportedly declined to receive any pay there. In 1951, he retired and stayed at the Akashi Uenomaru Nursing Home. He continued preaching while there. Around 1955, he was invited to speak at the Tokyo Korean YMCA.

A Japanese reporter for The Asahi Shimbun reportedly learned that Soda was unable to visit Korea, and published a column on January 1, 1960, in which they advocated for Soda to be allowed to. The story was also relayed by an Associated Press reporter, and it made its way into South Korean newspapers. South Korean pastor Kyung-Chik Han also joined in the advocacy. Han, who was then running the Youngnak Borinwon orphanage, served as Soda's guarantor for the trip. They managed to secure a plane for him; on May 6, 1961, Soda returned via Gimpo Airport to Korea, where he would spend the rest of his life.

== Death and legacy ==
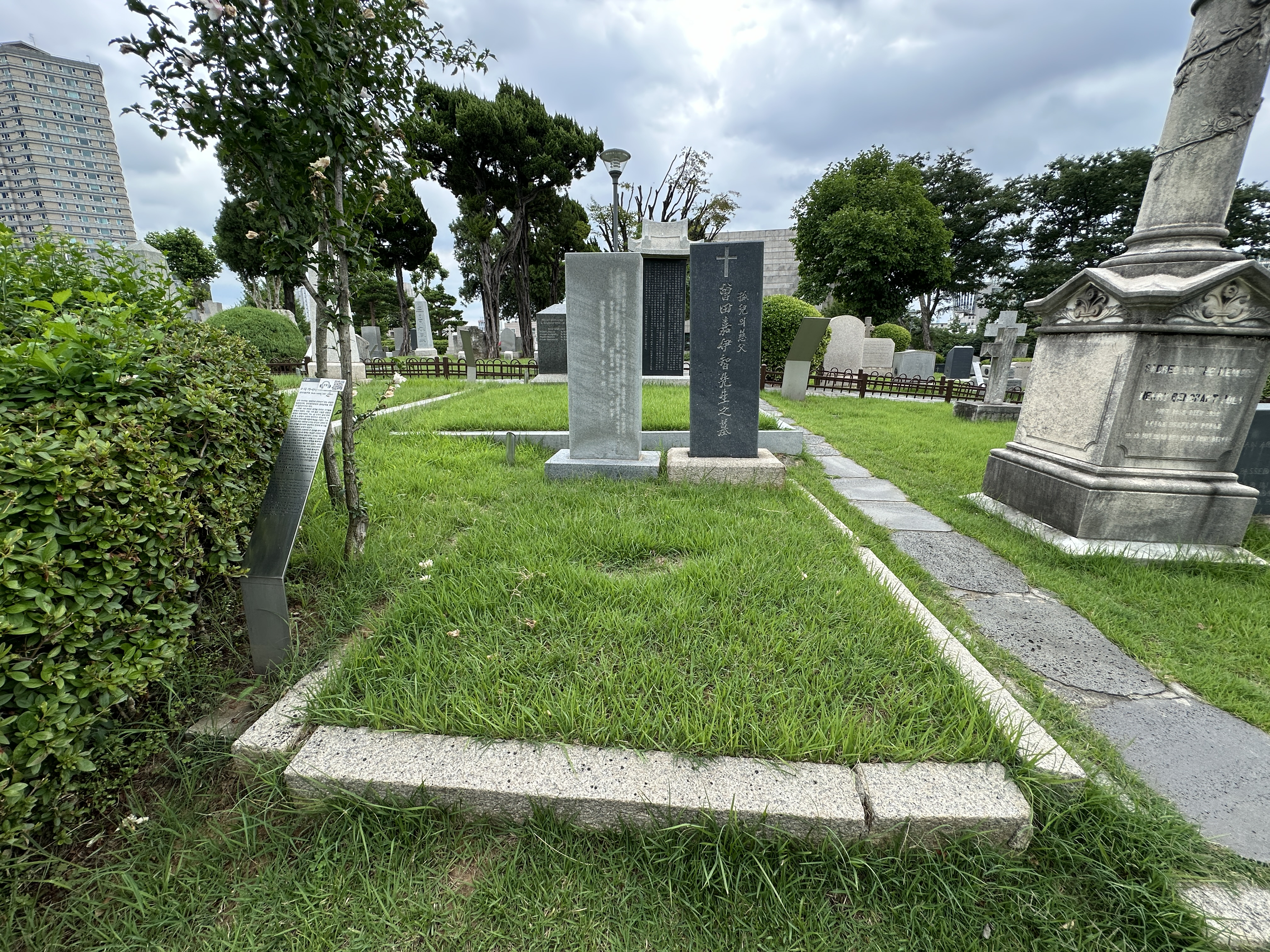
Soda's grave in Yanghwajin Foreign Missionary Cemetery (2024)

Soda died, aged 94, on March 28, 1962, at the Youngnak Borinwon. A funeral was held for him on April 2 at the building Bumingwan. Reportedly around 2,000 people attended the funeral, including his niece Sumiko Masuda. South Korean leader Park Chung Hee and Japanese Foreign Minister Zentarō Kosaka sent flowers to the ceremony. He was described in the Japanese press as a positive contributor to Japan–Korea relations. A memorial ceremony was also held for him in Japan, on April 28.

Before his death, he reportedly asked to be buried in Korea. His remains were interred in Yanghwajin Foreign Missionary Cemetery on April 4. To date, Soda and his wife are the only Japanese people to be buried there. His grave is marked with a cross and reads: "Loving father to orphans. The grave of Soda Kaichi sensei" (孤兒의 慈父 曾田嘉伊智先生之墓). He is buried alongside his wife. Soda's family removed part of his beard and buried it in the family cemetery in Japan.

Soda is remembered fondly in South Korea, and is often called "father to Korean orphans". On April 28, 1962, he became the first Japanese person to be awarded the South Korean Order of Cultural Merit. In 1964, a memorial ceremony was held for him in Seoul. He has been featured in Korean documentaries.

Soda was reportedly a private, frugal, and humble person, and did not seek recognition for his actions. It is reportedly difficult to find historical materials about him; information on him largely comes from people who knew him.

== See also ==
- Tatsuji Fuse – a Japanese lawyer sympathetic to Koreans during the colonial period
