= John W. Heron =

Medical missionary to Korea (1856–1890)

John William Heron
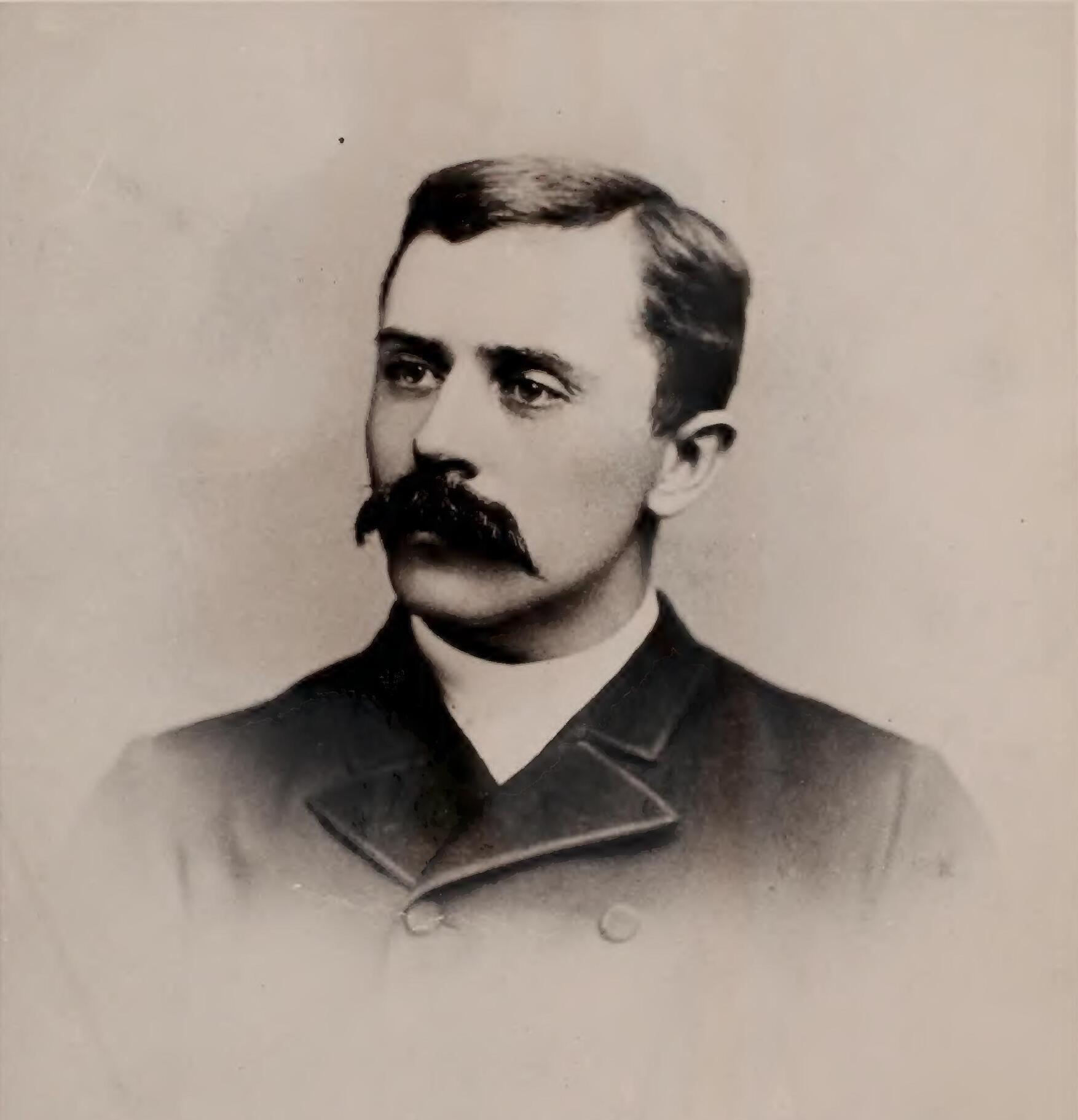
- Born: June 16, 1858; Derbyshire, England, United Kingdom
- Died: July 27, 1890 (aged 32); Seoul, Joseon
- Burial place: Yanghwajin Foreign Missionary Cemetery
- Citizenship: United Kingdom; United States
- Spouse: Harriet E. "Hattie" Gibson (m. 1885)

John William Heron (1856–1890) was an English-born American medical missionary to Joseon-dynasty Korea who was affiliated to the Northern Presbyterian Church. His name in Korean was Hyeron (혜론). He founded The Korean Religious Tract Society. His personality is described as meticulous and devoted while overfocusing on small details and having trouble letting go.

== Life and career ==
John William Heron was born in Derbyshire, England on June 15, 1856.

In 1870, at the age of fourteen, he moved to Knoxville, Tennessee, after his father lost a court case. He went to Maryville College. He was then permitted to study at the University of Tennessee and graduated in 1883. On April 28 of that same year, he became a U.S. citizen. After that, he went to further education at the New York University Hospital before refusing an offer to become a professor from the University of Tennessee, instead favoring being a Korean medical missionary.

Heron went to Japan on May 1, 1885, after marrying Harriet Gibson on April 23, and learned Korea's language and customs during his stay there.

After arriving in Incheon on June 20 and then Seoul on June 21, 1885 (he had previously tried to go in 1884, but the political situation was too unstable), Dr. Heron worked in Chejungwon, today known as Severance Hospital and the Yonsei University College of Medicine.

When Horace Newton Allen, a fellow doctor, became a diplomat in 1887, John took his place as Emperor Gojong's personal physician, and became the second director of Chejungwon.

== Death and legacy ==
In the summer of 1890, Heron was treating patients sick with dysentery when he caught it himself and died on July 26 or July 27. His final words were "Jesus loves you. He gave His life for you. Stand by Him!" He also asked his wife to preach the gospel.

Three days later, on July 30/31, 1890, John William Heron was buried at Yanghwajin Foreign Missionary Cemetery, the first Protestant to end up as such. He was 33 years old and left behind his wife along with two daughters. His tombstone has "The Son of God loved me and gave himself for me" inscribed on it.

In May of 2019, the Yonsei University College of Medicine opened the Heron Memorial Hall on the first floor of their Clinical Medicine Research Center. The hall displays his tombstone, life story, and the decree Joseon gave him when he became 2nd rank Gaseon Daebu.
