= Donggyo-dong =

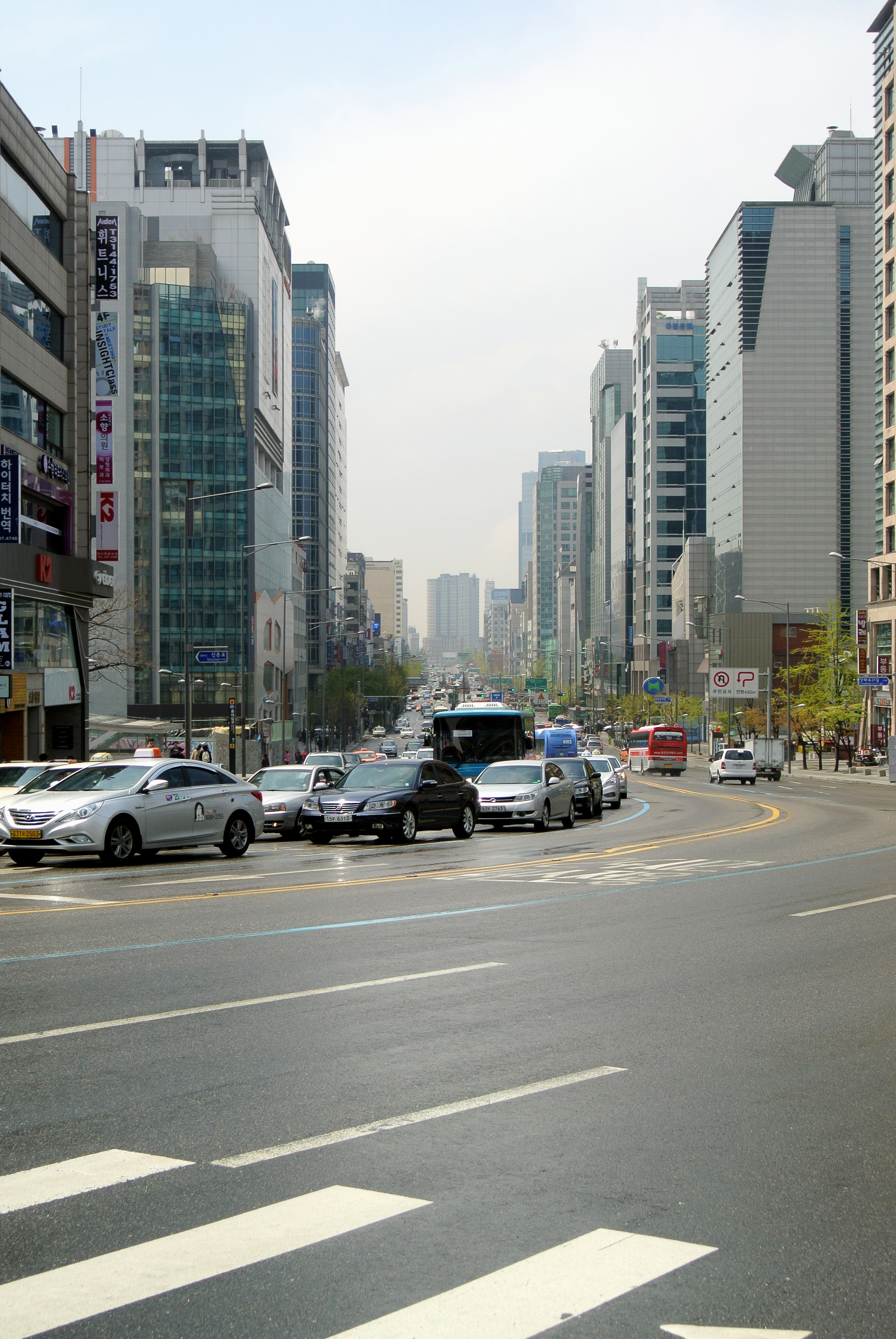
- Yangwha-ro, view towards southwest from Donggyo-dong intersection
- Country: South Korea

Area
  - Total: 0.69 km^{2} (0.27 sq mi)

Population (2001)
  - Total: 13,613
  - Density: 20,000/km^{2} (51,000/sq mi)

Korean name
- Hangul: 동교동
- Hanja: 東橋洞
- RR: Donggyo-dong
- MR: Tonggyo-dong

Donggyo-dong (Korean: 동교동) is a dong (neighborhood) of Mapo District, Seoul, South Korea.

== See also ==
- Administrative divisions of South Korea
