= Rosetta Sherwood Hall =

Canadian missionary (1865–1951)

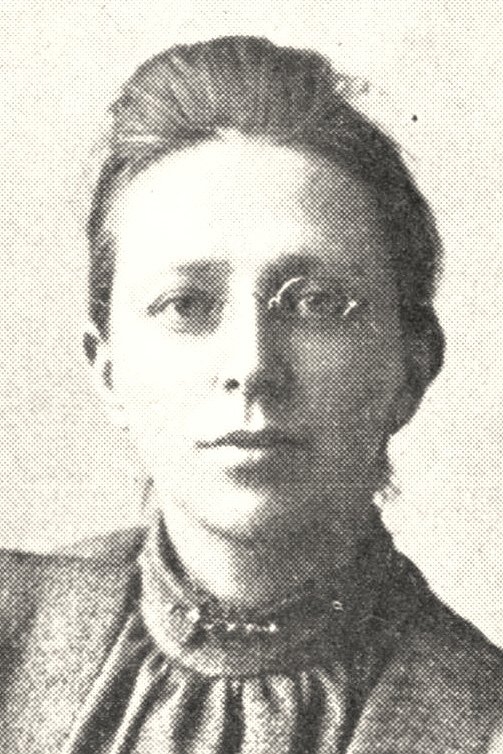
- Born: September 19, 1865; Liberty, New York
- Died: April 5, 1951 (aged 85); Ocean Grove, New Jersey
- Occupation: Medical missionary in Korea
- Spouse: William James Hall

Rosetta Sherwood Hall (September 19, 1865 – April 5, 1951) was an American medical missionary and educator. She founded the Pyongyang School for the Deaf and Blind. Hall spent forty-four years in Korea, helping develop educational resources for disabled Koreans and implementing women's medical training.

== Early life and education ==
Rosetta Sherwood was born on September 19, 1865, in Liberty, New York, the eldest child of English immigrants, Phoebe (née Gildersleeve) and Rosevelt Rensler Sherwood. She graduated from Oswego State Normal School in 1883 and worked as a local school teacher. After attending an 1886 visiting-lecture about the need for medical missions in India, she enrolled in the Woman's Medical College of Pennsylvania. She graduated with her medical degree by 1889.

== Career ==
Hall founded the Baldwin Dispensary in Seoul (renamed the Lilian Harris Memorial Hospital). In 1894, she initiated the teaching of sight-impaired people in Korea by teaching a blind girl, using a modification of Braille that she had developed. In 1899, she established the Edith Margaret Memorial Wing of the Women's Dispensary (Pyongyang). In 1909, she established the Pyongyang School for the Deaf and Blind. Along with two Korean doctors, Taik Won Kim and his wife, Chung-Hee Kil, she founded the Chosun Women's Medical Training Institute in 1928. After Hall’s retirement, Kim and Kil took charge of the Women’s Medical Training Institute from 1933 to 1937. In 1933 she left Korea.

== Personal life ==
While working at Madison Street Mission Dispensary, she met her Canadian-born husband William James Hall. Hall was working at the same dispensary and was listed to leave on a medical mission to China with the Methodist Episcopal Church of Canada, which inspired her to apply for a similar position. She was officially called by the Women's Foreign Missionary Society of the Methodist Episcopal Church in 1890. They did not marry until they "met in the foreign field" as they were each separately placed by separate mission boards. They married in June 1892 and she lost her U.S. citizenship when they married.

She died on April 5, 1951, in Ocean Grove, New Jersey, and was buried with her family at the Yanghwajin Foreign Missionary Cemetery in Yanghwajin, Seoul.

== Bibliography ==
- Hall, Rosetta S. (1906) "The Clocke class for blind girls," Korea Mission Field 2 (No.9, July) 175-76.
- Hall, Rosetta Sherwood, ed. (1897) Life of Rev. William James Hall: Medical Missionary to the Slums of New York, Pioneer Missionary to Pyong Yang, Korea; Introduction by Willard F. Mallalieu.
