= Seonyudo, Seoul =

Island in Seoul, South Korea

Coordinates: 37°32′37″N 126°53′59″E

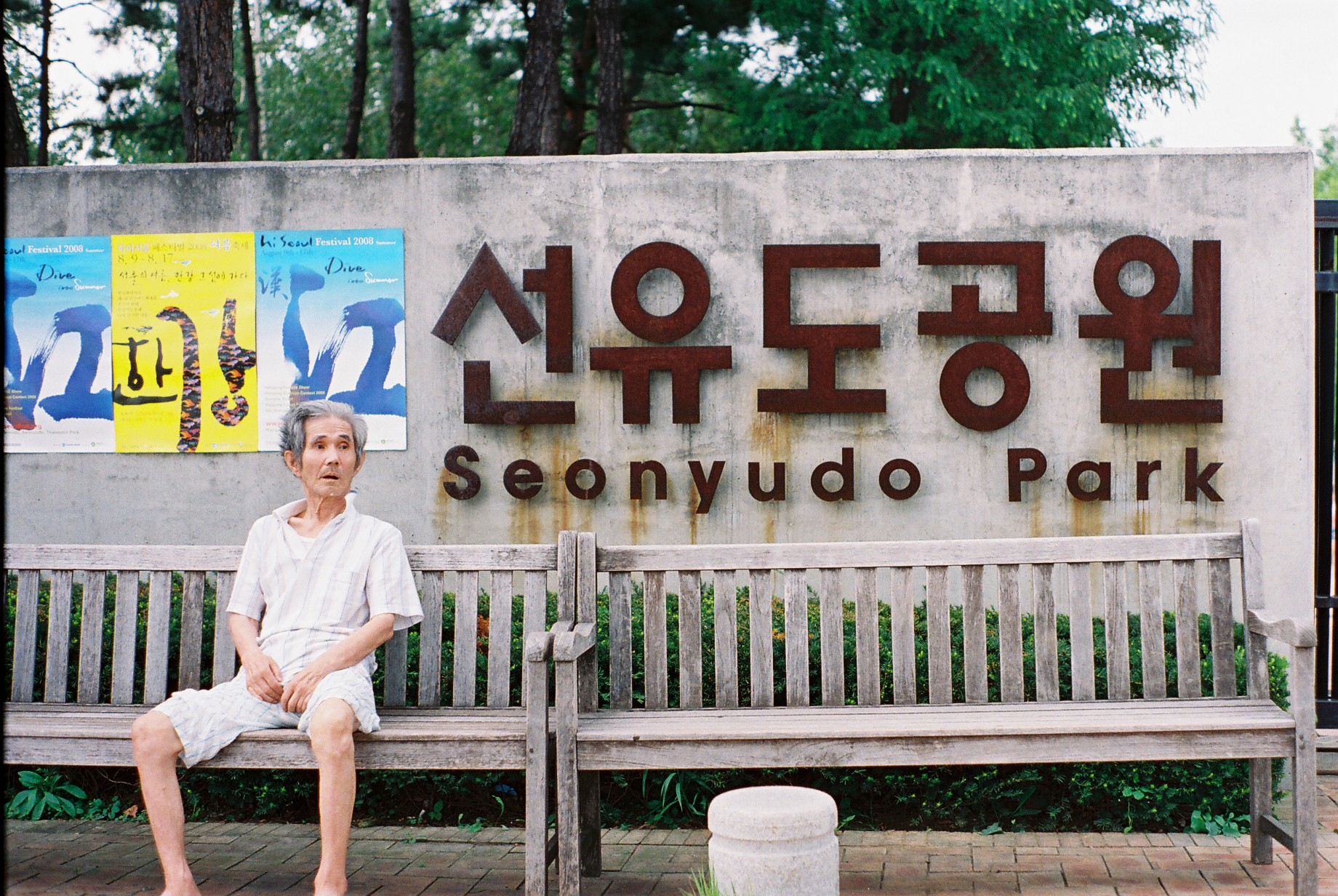
- Seonyudo Park

Korean name
- Hangul: 선유도
- Hanja: 仙遊島
- RR: Seonyudo
- MR: Sŏnyudo

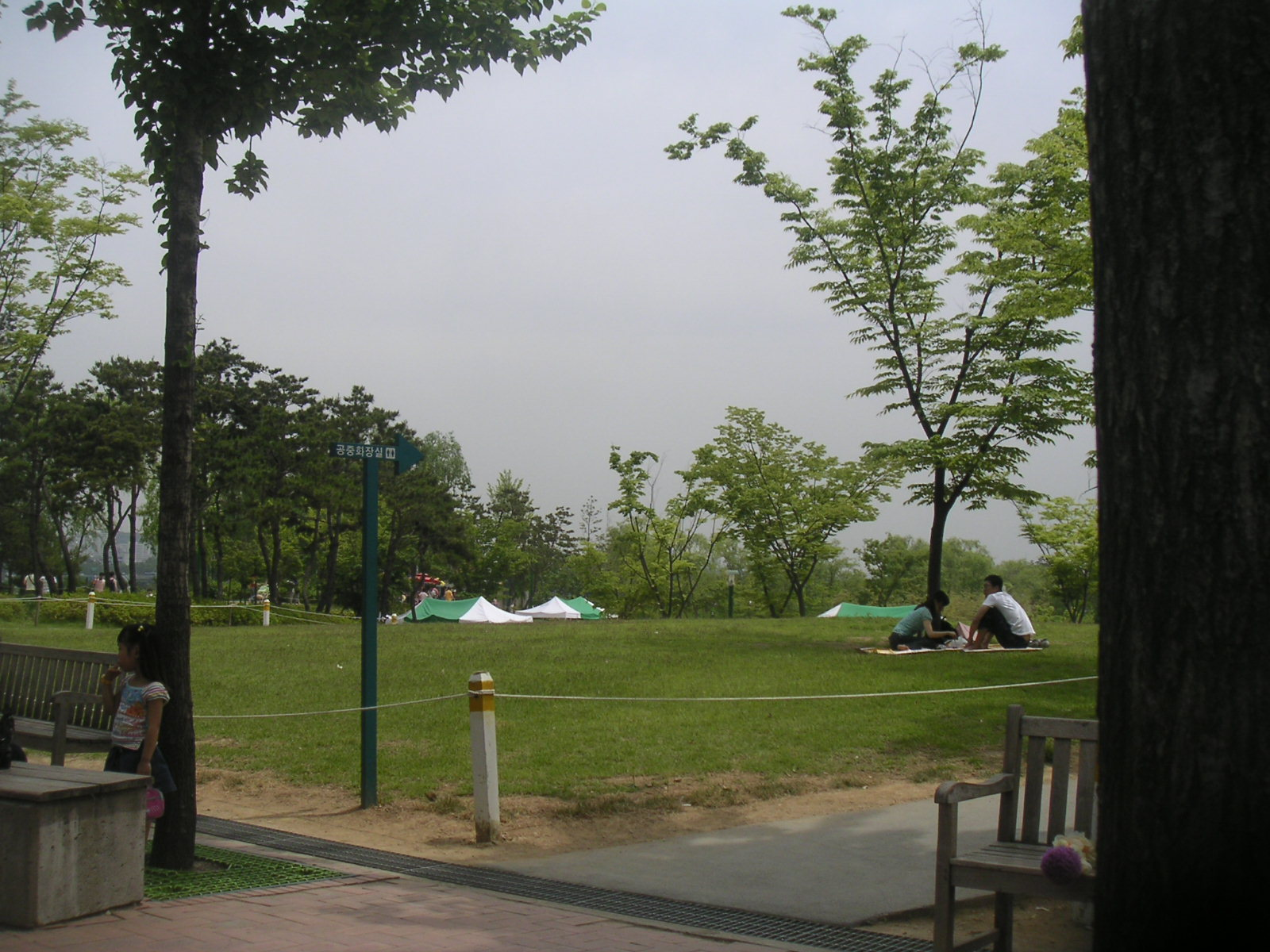
Inside the park, 2005.

Seonyudo (Korean: 선유도) is an island in the Han River in Seoul, South Korea. There is a Seonyudo park all over the island. The total area of the island is 0.11 km^{2}. Seonyudo Park is an ecological park that meets the Yanghwa Bridge.

== History ==
Seonyudo was a small mountain called Seonyubong.But, when Japanese colonial era, they were cut off, collecting rocks to stop the flood and pave the way. With the construction of the Yanghwa Bridge from June 1962 to January 1965, Seonyubong completely disappeared.

From 1978 to 2000, Seonyudo was used as a water filtration plant to supply tap water to the southwestern part of Seoul. In December 2000, Seonyudo water filtration plant was closed and then a park was set up. On April 26, 2002, it opened as a public park, Seonyudo Park.

== Composition ==
- Han River exhibit hall: The exhibition hall displays photos and videos showing history and four seasons of the Han River.
- Water purification plant: Water purification plants were made by recycling past Seonyudo water filtration plant. It uses aquatic plants to purify water and supplies water to various facilities in the park.
- Water playground: The water playground uses water from the water purification plant. The water is shallow(15 cm) so that children can play safe.
- Garden of green column: The garden is where the columns are left to show the vestiges of the reservoir that used to hold water and an ivy is growing on the columns.
