= Sinsu-dong =

Coordinates: 34°54′N 128°05′E

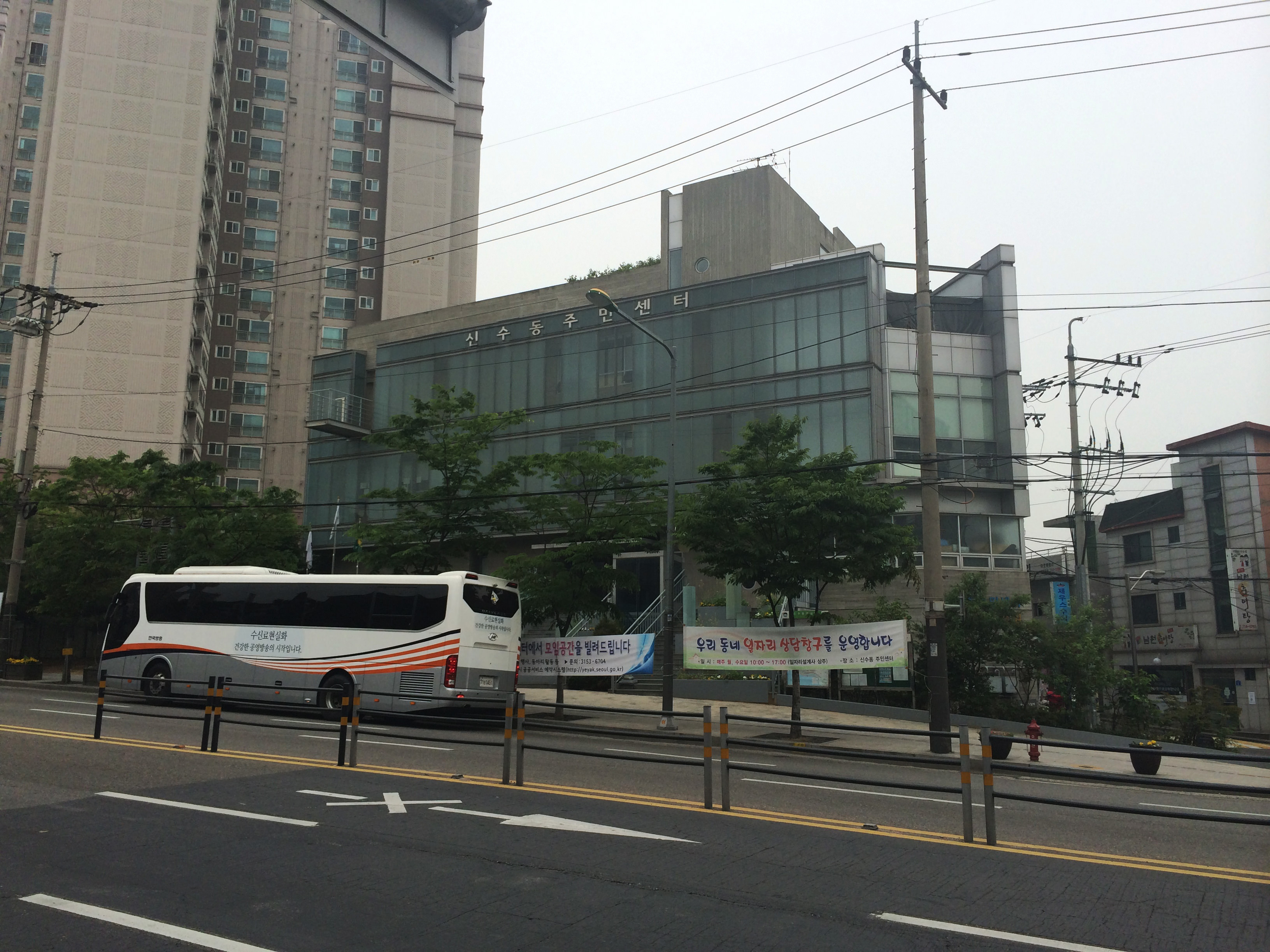
- Sinsu-dong Comunity Service Center, 2014
- Interactive map of Sinsu-dong
- Country: South Korea

Area
  - Total: 0.67 km^{2} (0.26 sq mi)

Population (2001)
  - Total: 20,333
  - Density: 30,000/km^{2} (79,000/sq mi)

Korean name
- Hangul: 신수동
- Hanja: 新水洞
- RR: Sinsu-dong
- MR: Sinsu-dong

Sinsu-dong (Korean: 신수동) is a dong (neighbourhood) of Mapo District, Seoul, South Korea.

== Overview ==
Shinsu-dong is located in the southeastern part of Mapo District and borders the Han River. It originally consisted of three legal neighborhoods, Shinsu-dong, Hyeonseok-dong, and Gusu-dong, but on January 1, 2007, a boundary adjustment incorporated parts of Daeheung-dong and Sinjeong-dong. As a densely built residential area with relatively weak urban infrastructure, it has been undergoing active road-widening, redevelopment, and reconstruction projects.

The neighborhood name was changed from Sinseok-dong to Shinsu-dong on May 5, 1970. The names Shinsu-dong and Hyeonseok-dong are believed to originate from the earlier place names Sucheolli and Heukseok-ri, respectively.

== See also ==
- Administrative divisions of South Korea
