= William James Hall =

Canadian missionary (1860–1894)

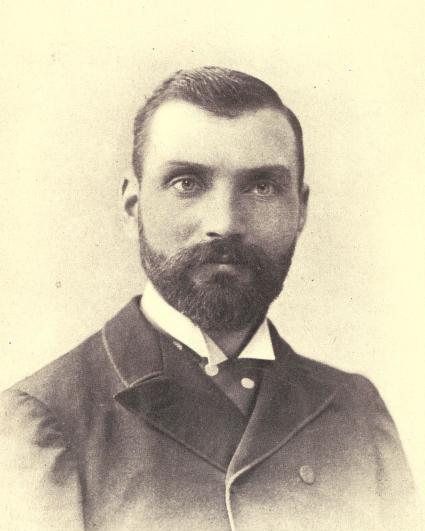
- Born: January 16, 1860
- Died: November 24, 1894 (aged 34)
- Occupation: Medical missionary
- Years active: 1887-1894
- Spouse: Rosetta Sherwood Hall

William James Hall (January 16, 1860 – November 24, 1894) was a Canadian medical and religious missionary in Korea, primarily in Pyongyang during the 1890s. Upon graduation from medical school, he worked in New York and was appointed as Medical Superintendent at the Madison Street Medical Mission under the supervision of the Methodist Episcopal Church. During his three years in Korea, Hall expanded the Methodist Mission, providing care for Korean soldiers and Pyongyang residents during the First Sino-Japanese War. Hall died of typhus on November 24, 1894, tending to wounded on the banks of the Taedong River.

== Early life and education ==
Hall was born in a log cabin in Glen Buell, Ontario, Canada on January 16, 1860. As the eldest of five children, he devoted his life to the Presbyterian Church at fourteen years old, butsuffered from poor health. Hall left the Glen Buell schoolhouse to pursue an early career in carpentry at the age of seventeen.

After suffering from a severe fever due to consumption, Hall left carpentry to return to school and pursue academics, gaining acceptance to Athens High School in 1880. Hall received his Teaching Certificate in 1883 and entered Medical College at Queens University in Kingston, Ontario in 1885. His training included attending the Dwight L. Moody Summer School in Northfield, Massachusetts. Hall traveled to New York City in 1887, where he graduated from medical school at Bellevue Hospital Medical College in 1889. Hall was appointed as Medical Superintendent at the Madison Street Medical Mission.

== Career ==
Hall's official call to Korean Missionary Service came on September 19, 1891. Hall traveled by ship from Vancouver on November 19, 1891, arriving in Seoul in December 1891. He worked in Seoul for four months prior to his departure for the interior of Korea. Hall walked 700 miles with other missionaries to his proposed station. In August 1892, he was posted to the Pyongyang Circuit mission. He was "the first missionary appointed to exclusive work in the interior" and he went without his spouse. Upon arriving in Pyongyang, Hall's two helpers as well as the Korean individuals who rented him his lodging and medical supplies, were jailed by the Korean governor's police. Hall was released through discussion with the Korean Missionary Service. Through political appeasement and the provision of medical care to the Korean Governor, Hall gradually made peace with the Korean people and eventually ended the seal of the Hermit Kingdom. During his three-year stay in Korea, Hall expanded the Methodist Mission, provided care for Korean soldiers and Pyongyang residents during the First Sino-Japanese War. During his last trip on the Pyongyang circuit, Hall cared for numerous war injuries. He contracted malaria and returned to Seoul. On his return, he contracted typhus while tending to wounded men on the banks of the Taedong River. He died on November 24, 1894.

== Personal life ==
Hall met his wife and fellow medical missionary, Rosetta Sherwood, through their work at the Madison Street Medical Mission at the Roosevelt Street Dispensary in New York City. Hall was initially placed by the Methodist Episcopal Church of Canada to the China Mission. Sherwood applied for a job through a separate missionary board in 1887 in China under Hall's supervision but was instead placed in Korea in 1890. Hall applied and was granted reassignment to Korea. The two were married in June 1892 in Korea. They had one son, Sherwood Hall, a medical missionary to Korea and India, and a daughter born in 1895 after his death.
