= Seogyo-dong =

- Interactive map of Seogyo-dong
- Coordinates: 37°33′19″N 126°55′18″E
- Country: South Korea

Area
  - Total: 0.94 km^{2} (0.36 sq mi)

Population (2001)
  - Total: 18,700
  - Density: 20,000/km^{2} (52,000/sq mi)

Korean name
- Hangul: 서교동
- Hanja: 西橋洞
- RR: Seogyo-dong
- MR: Sŏgyo-dong

Seogyo-dong (Korean: 서교동) is a dong (neighbourhood) of Mapo District, Seoul, South Korea.

== Overview ==
Seogyo-dong was named after a stream that once flowed down from the valley of Yeonhui-dong and branched out in several directions in this area. Many small bridges were built over it, and the village came to be called "Jandari Village" ("many bridges").

Because Seogyo-dong is located slightly lower than Donggyo-dong, it was referred to as "Lower Jandari," while Donggyo-dong was called "Upper Jandari." The term "West Jandari" was shortened to "Seosegyori" (西細橋里), and from this name the modern name "Seogyo-dong" originated.

== Education ==
Seogyo Elementary School is located in Seogyo-dong.

== See also ==
- Administrative divisions of South Korea
