= Yeomni-dong =

- Interactive map of Yeomni-dong
- Country: South Korea

Area
  - Total: 0.53 km^{2} (0.20 sq mi)

Population (2001)
  - Total: 20,393
  - Density: 38,000/km^{2} (100,000/sq mi)

Korean name
- Hangul: 염리동
- Hanja: 鹽里洞
- RR: Yeomni-dong
- MR: Yŏmni-dong

Yeomni-dong (Korean: 염리동) is a dong (neighbourhood) of Mapo District, Seoul, South Korea.

== Overview ==
Yeomni-dong was historically a key area supplying salt to Seoul. Salt boats entered and left through Samga Pier (Mapo Ferry), salt markets were set up here, and many salt merchants lived in the area. Villages that formed Yeomni-dong included Neutinamubaegi, Ssangnyongdae, Gaebawi, Maruboshi Company housing area, and Gochubatmeori.

Neutinamubaegi, around present-day Nos. 65–67, was named after a zelkova tree (neutinamu) standing on a hill. The zelkova is a tree widely found in Korea and is often used as a village guardian tree or a shade tree at village entrances.

== See also ==
- Administrative divisions of South Korea
