= Yanghwa Bridge =

Bridge in Seoul, South Korea

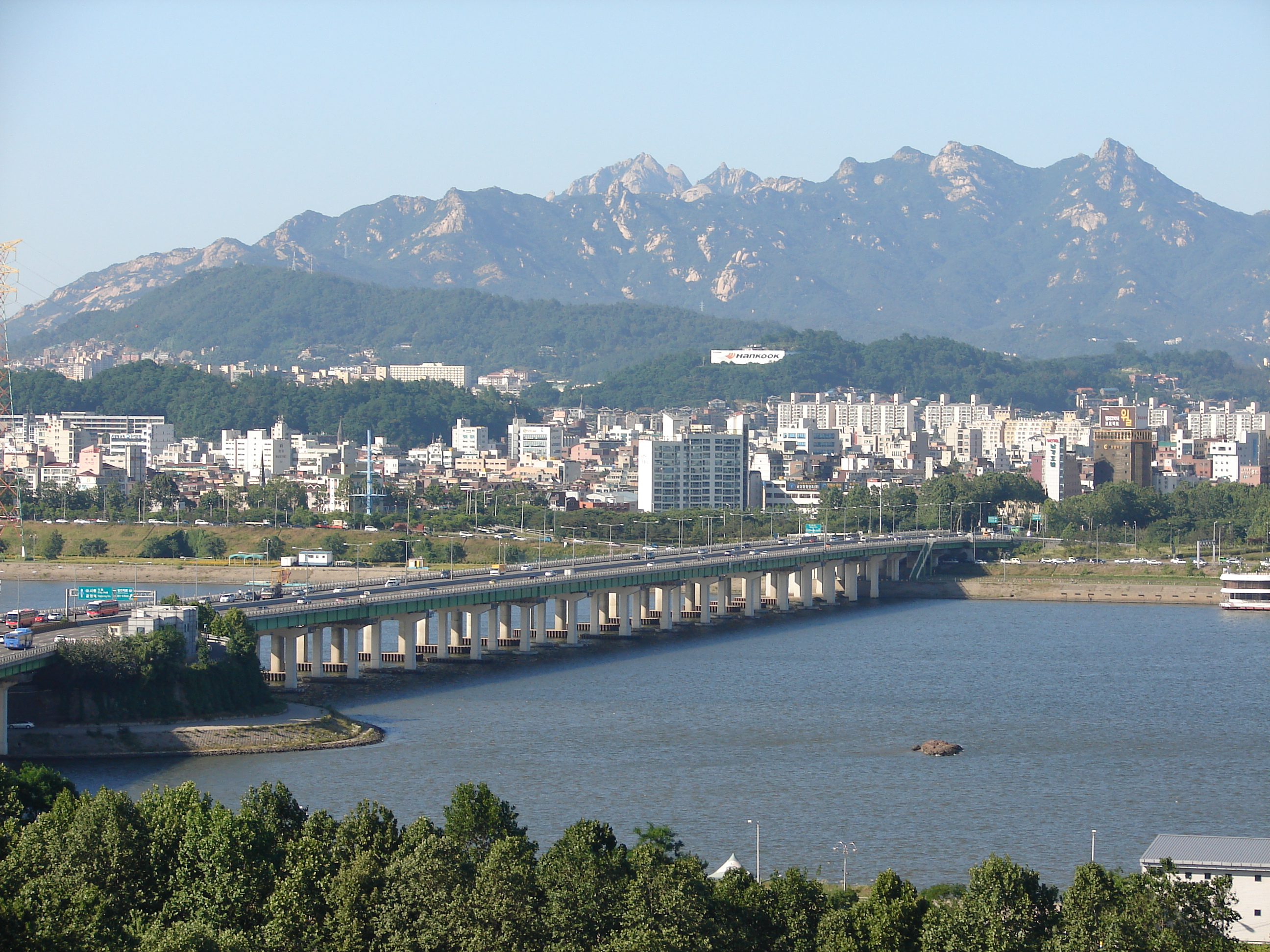
- The Yanghwa Bridge, facing north. Bukhansan is in the background.
- Coordinates: 37°32′N 126°54′E
- Crosses: Han River
- Locale: Between Mapo-gu and Yeongdeungpo-gu, Seoul, Republic of Korea

Characteristics
- Material: Steel plate, concrete
- Total length: 1,053m
- Width: Old bridge:18m New bridge:16.1m

History
- Designer: Old bridge: Daehan Design Corporation; New bridge: Daehan Consultants Co.Ltd
- Constructed by: Old bridge: Hyundai Engineering & Construction; New bridge: Sambu Construction, Co. Ltd
- Construction start: Old bridge: June 1962; New bridge: January 1979
- Construction end: Old bridge: January 1965; New bridge: February 1982

Korean name
- Hangul: 양화대교
- Hanja: 楊花大橋
- RR: Yanghwa daegyo
- MR: Yanghwa taegyo

Location
- Interactive map of Yanghwa Bridge

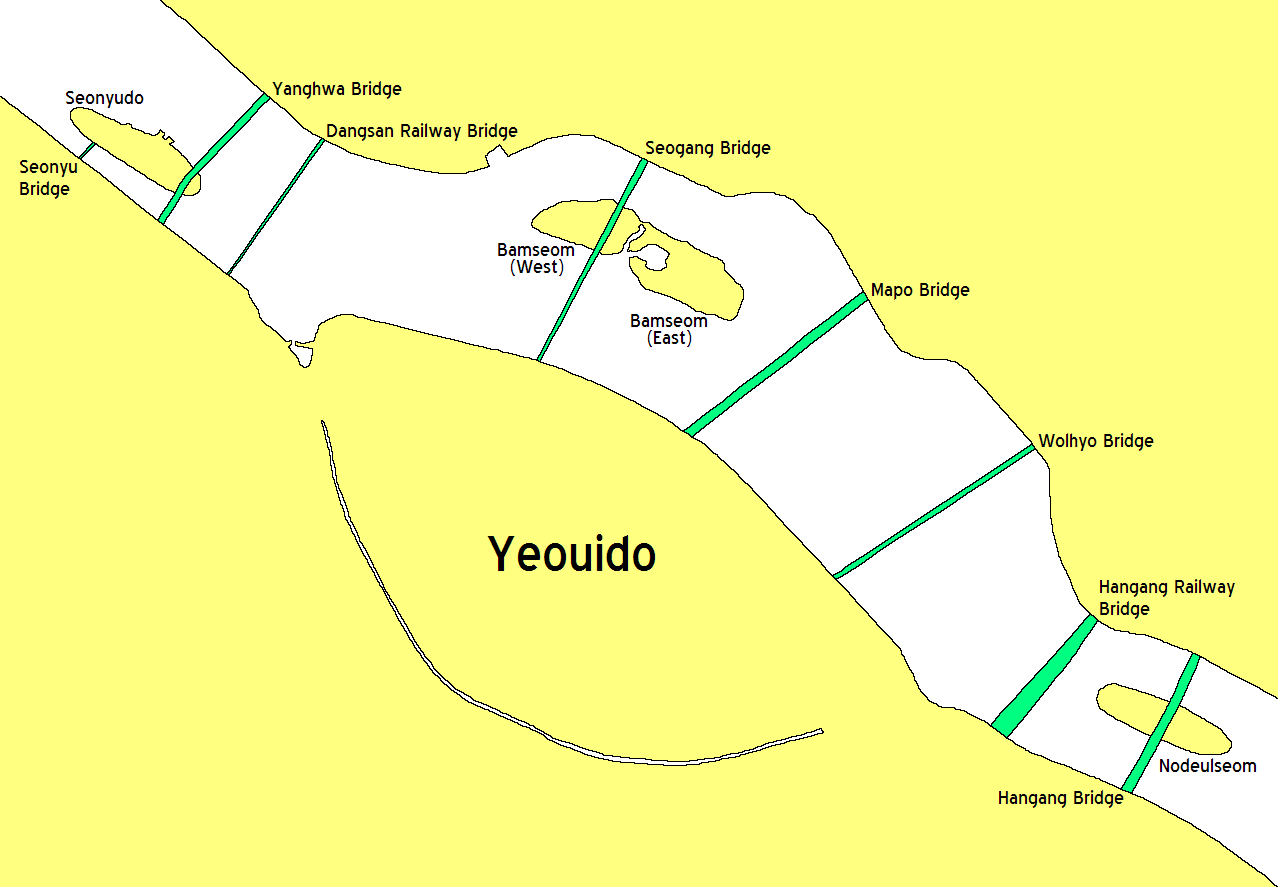
Yeouido map

The Yanghwa Bridge (Korean: 양화대교), formerly known as the Second Hangang Bridge (제2한강교; lit. 'Second Han River Bridge'), is an eight lane bridge spanning the Han River in Seoul, South Korea. The bridge connects Mapo District on the north side of the river to Yeongdeungpo District on the south side of the river. The bridge is buttressed by the eastern end of the island of Seonyudo, home to Seonyudo Park.

The bridge is a combination of two bridges: the old bridge, originally called the "Second Han River Bridge", completed in 1965; and the new bridge, completed in 1982. The old bridge was the first bridge built by Korean technology after independence in 1945 and served as the gateway from Seoul to the west coast. Due to increasing traffic, construction for an expansion started in 1979 and the new eight lane bridge was completed in February 1982.

The old bridge's upper structure has a width of 18 m (59 ft), length 1,053 m (3,455 ft), and is composed of steel plate girders and concrete box girders. The new bridge has a width of 16.2 m (53 ft), length 1,053 m (3,455 ft) and is a steel plate girder bridge. The lower structure has an open caisson well foundation.

The bridge went through repairs and renovations in 1996 and reopened in April 2002 with additional ramps. As of February 2010, the bridge is once again going through renovations by widening the space between bridge posts to allow 5000t ships to pass.

Yanghwa Bridge also has a song named after it by R&B/soul singer Zion.T, "양화대교 Yanghwa Bridge", released in 2014.

== See also ==
- List of Han River bridges
