= Mangwon-dong =

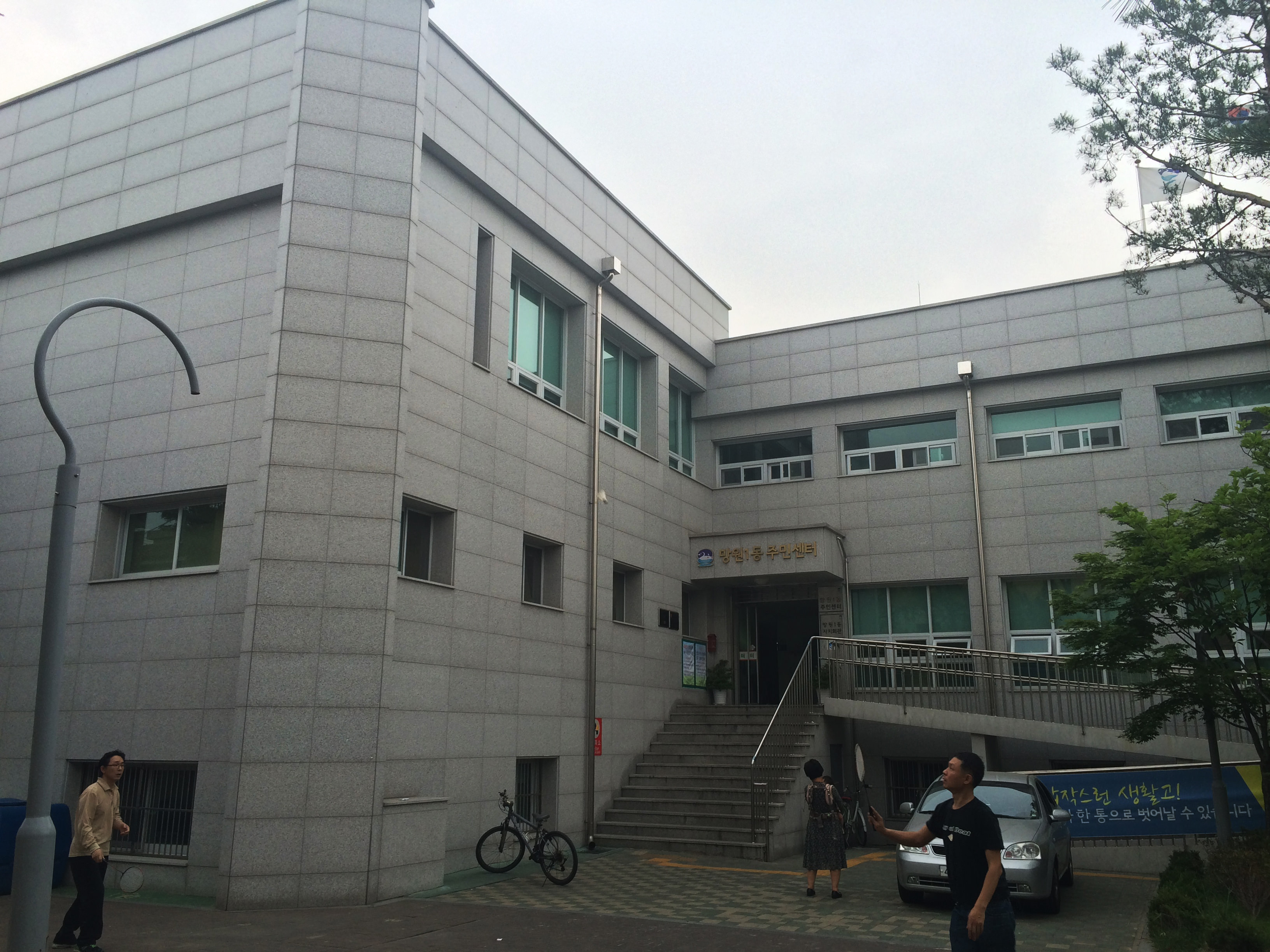
- A view of the Mangnidan-gil in Mangwon-dong Mangwon 1-dong Community Service Center
- Interactive map of Mangwon-dong
- Country: South Korea

Area
  - Total: 1.81 km^{2} (0.70 sq mi)

Population (2001)
  - Total: 45,841
  - Density: 25,300/km^{2} (65,600/sq mi)

Korean name
- Hangul: 망원동
- Hanja: 望遠洞
- RR: Mangwon-dong
- MR: Mangwŏn-dong

Mangwon-dong (Korean: 망원동) is a dong, or neighbourhood of the Mapo District, Seoul, South Korea.

== Overview ==
The name Mangwon-dong originates from Mangwonjeong, a pavilion from the Joseon Dynasty. Located along the Han River, Mangwon-dong was one of Seoul's areas prone to flooding until the early 1990s. Because of this, development was relatively limited, and Mangwon-dong has older housing compared to nearby Hapjeong-dong and Sangam-dong. It is also adjacent to the Seoul World Cup Stadium, which hosted the 2002 FIFA World Cup.

Historically, in 1867, under the Yukjeon Ordinance, Mangwonjeong 1, 2, and 3 gye were part of Yeonhuibang in northern Hanseongbu. On May 26, 1895, by Imperial Decree No. 98, Wolsadong was assigned to Mangwonjeong-gye, and Jeongjadong to Jeongjadong-gye in northwestern Yeonhuibang. On April 1, 1911, Mangwon-dong became part of Yeonhui-myeon, Goyang-gun, Gyeonggi-do under Gyeonggi-do Decree No. 3. The same decree in 1914 renamed it Mangwon-riin Yeonhui-myeon, Goyang-gun. On April 1, 1936, it was reorganized as Mangwonjeongin Gyeongseongbu under Governor-General of Korea Ordinance No. 8. On June 10, 1943, it was incorporated into Seodaemun-gu, Gyeongseongbu, by Ordinance No. 163, and on October 23, 1944, its jurisdiction was transferred to Mapo-gu by Ordinance No. 350. Finally, on October 1, 1946, it was officially named Mangwon-dong in Mapo-gu, Seoul Special City.

== See also ==
- Administrative divisions of South Korea
