= Seongsan-dong =

Neighborhood in Seoul, South Korea

- Country: South Korea

Korean name
- Hangul: 성산동
- Hanja: 城山洞
- RR: Seongsan-dong
- MR: Sŏngsan-dong

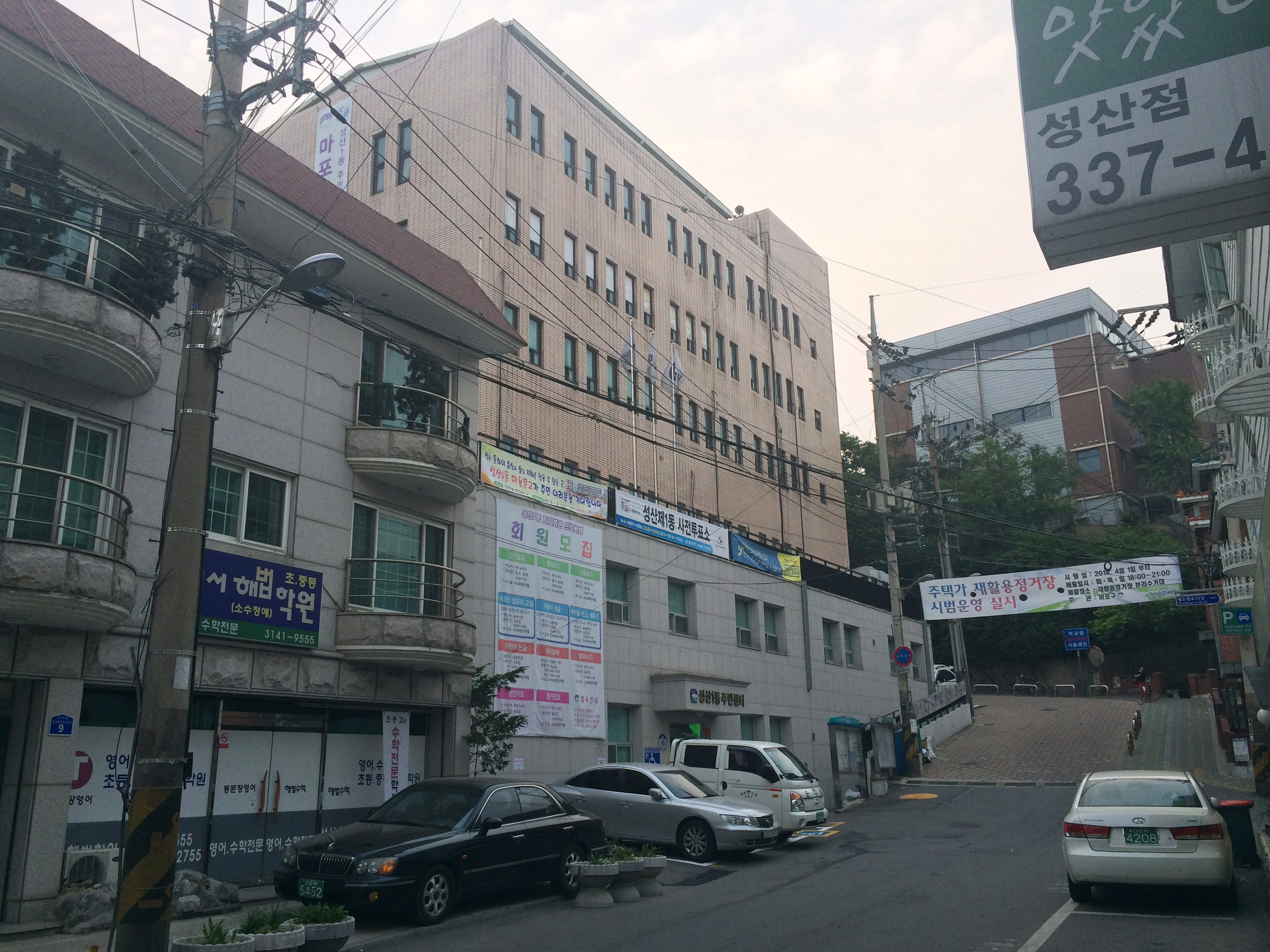
Seongsan 1-dong Community Service Center

Seongsan-dong (Korean: 성산동) is a dong (neighbourhood) of Mapo District, Seoul, South Korea.

== Overview ==
The mountains around this village form a fortress-like enclosure (城), which is why they were called Seongme or Seongmi in Korean and later rendered in Sino-Korean as Seongsan (城山, "Castle Mountain"). During his tenure as magistrate of Yangcheon, Jeong Seon (Gyeomjae) painted several works depicting this mountain. The area, once rice fields, began to change during the Japanese colonial period with the straightening of the Hongjecheon stream. This channelization led to land consolidation, and after liberation it developed further into the present residential Seongsan district.

The area around the Seongsan 2-dong Community Center was once called Muriul or Muidong (武夷洞), meaning it was considered unsafe to pass alone, so people traveled in groups.

Pulmugol (Yadong, 冶洞), on the way to Sangam-dong across the Bulgwangcheon stream, got its name from a forge built during King Hyojong’s reign by Kim Ja-jeom, who produced counterfeit coins for a rebellion. The area remained rice fields until the early 1950s, and old rusted coins were often found there.

== Attractions ==
- Seoul World Cup Stadium

== See also ==
- Administrative divisions of South Korea
