= Mapo District =

District of Seoul, South Korea

Mapo
- Autonomous District
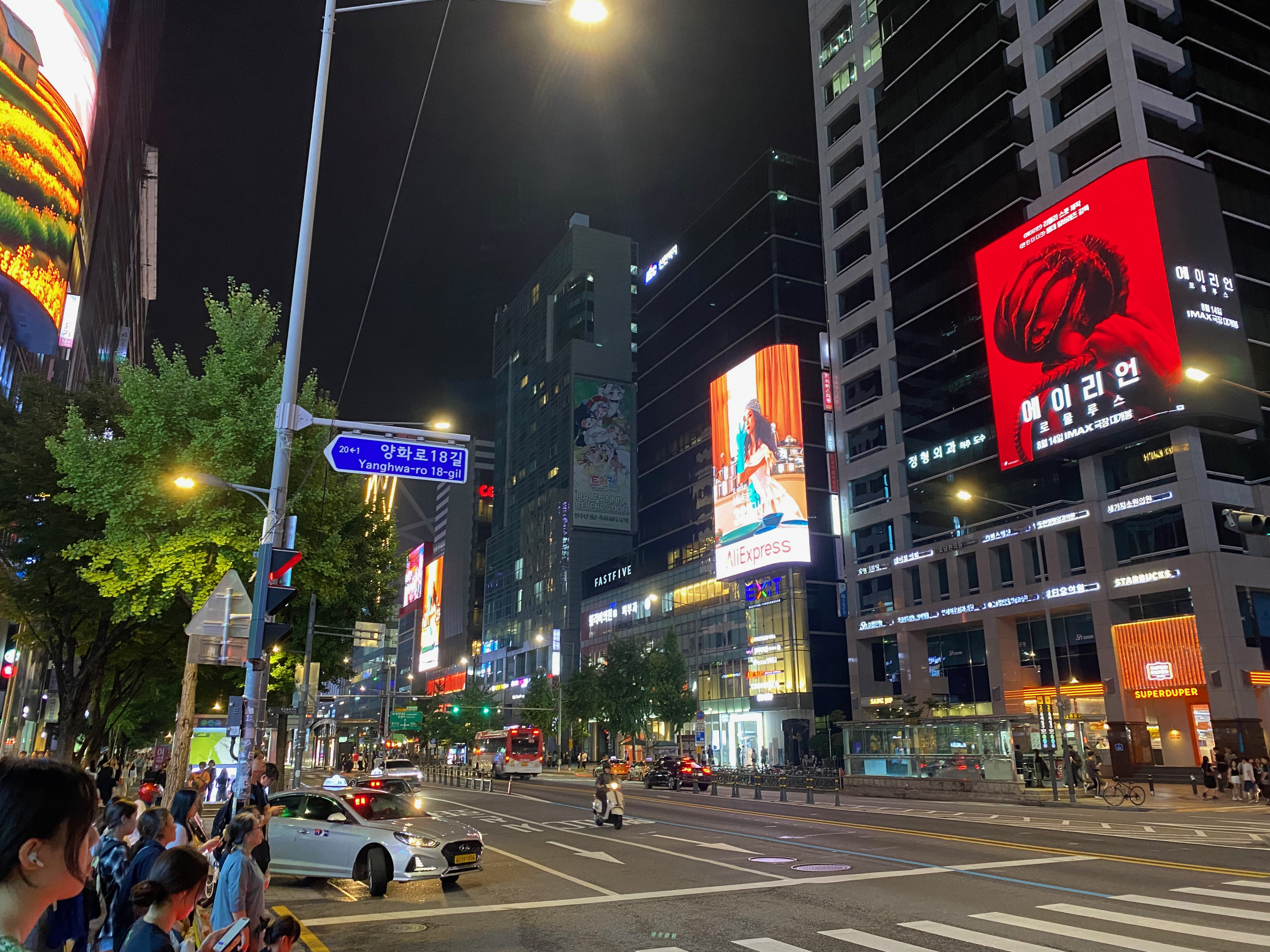
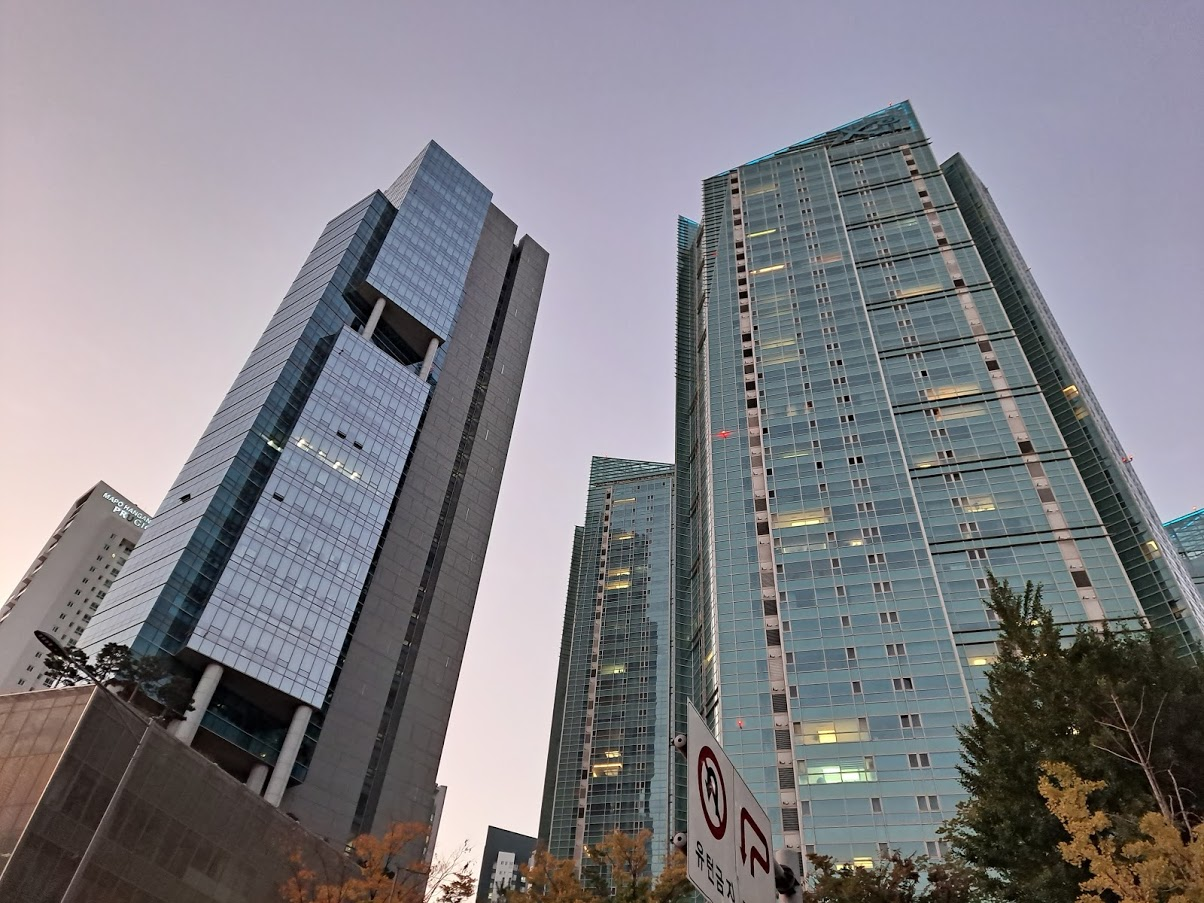
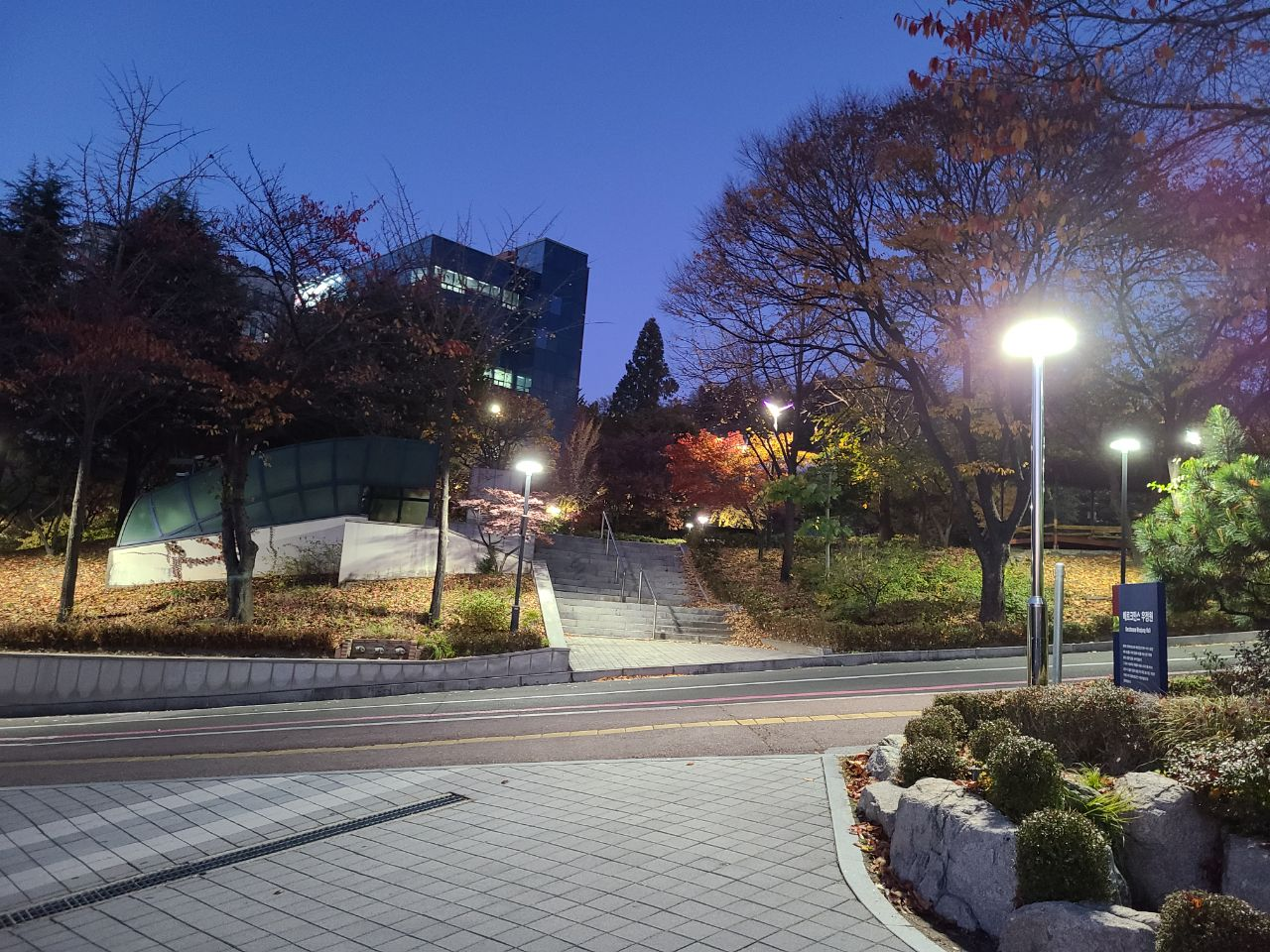
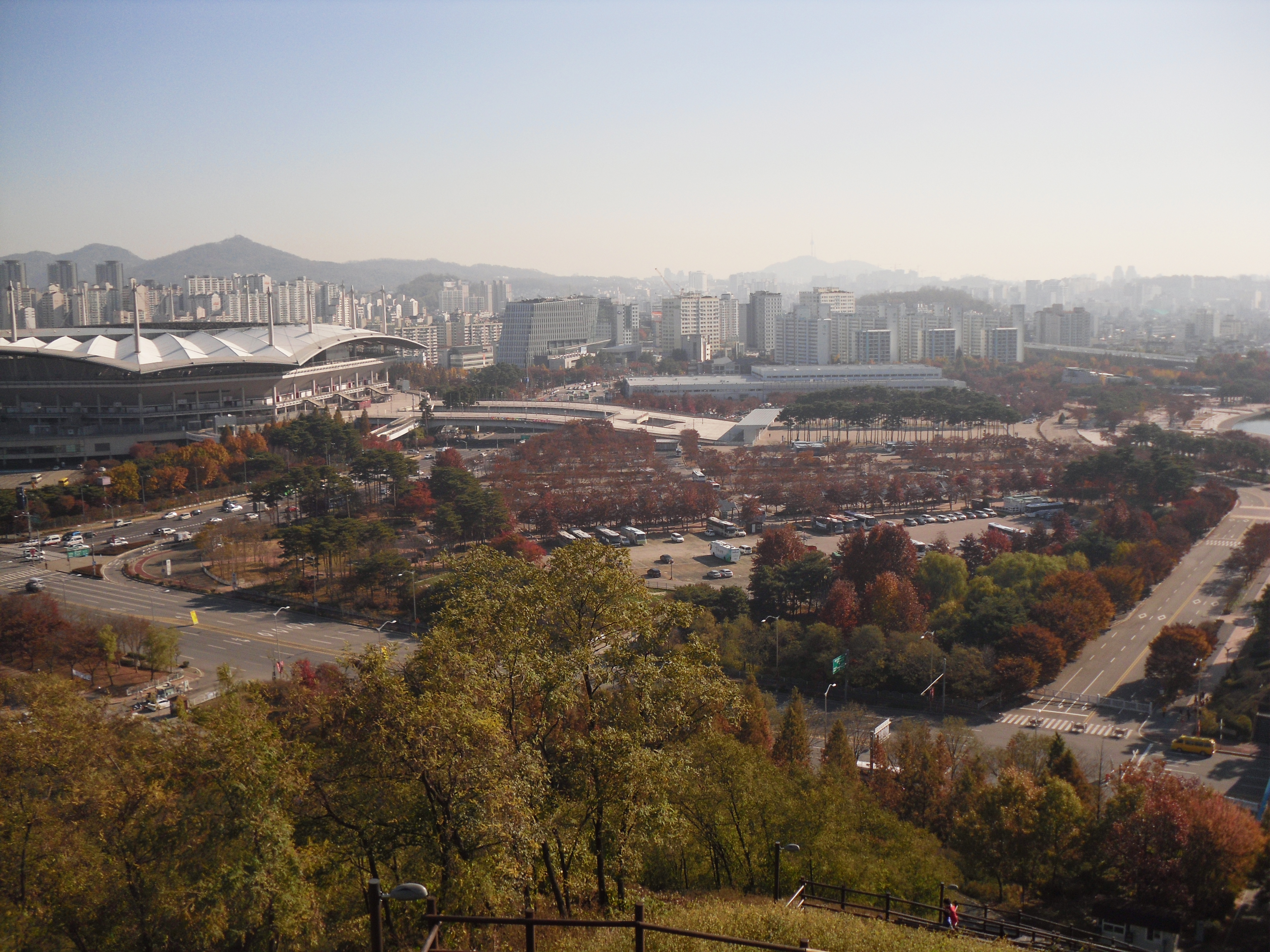
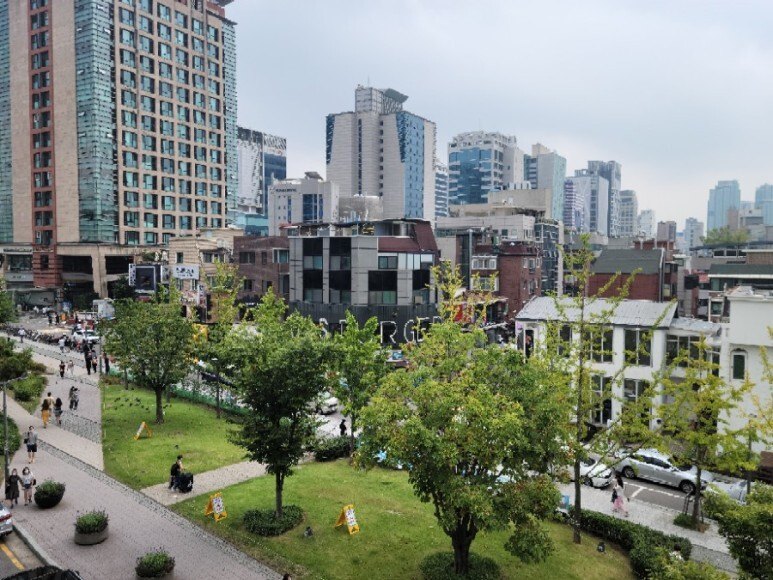
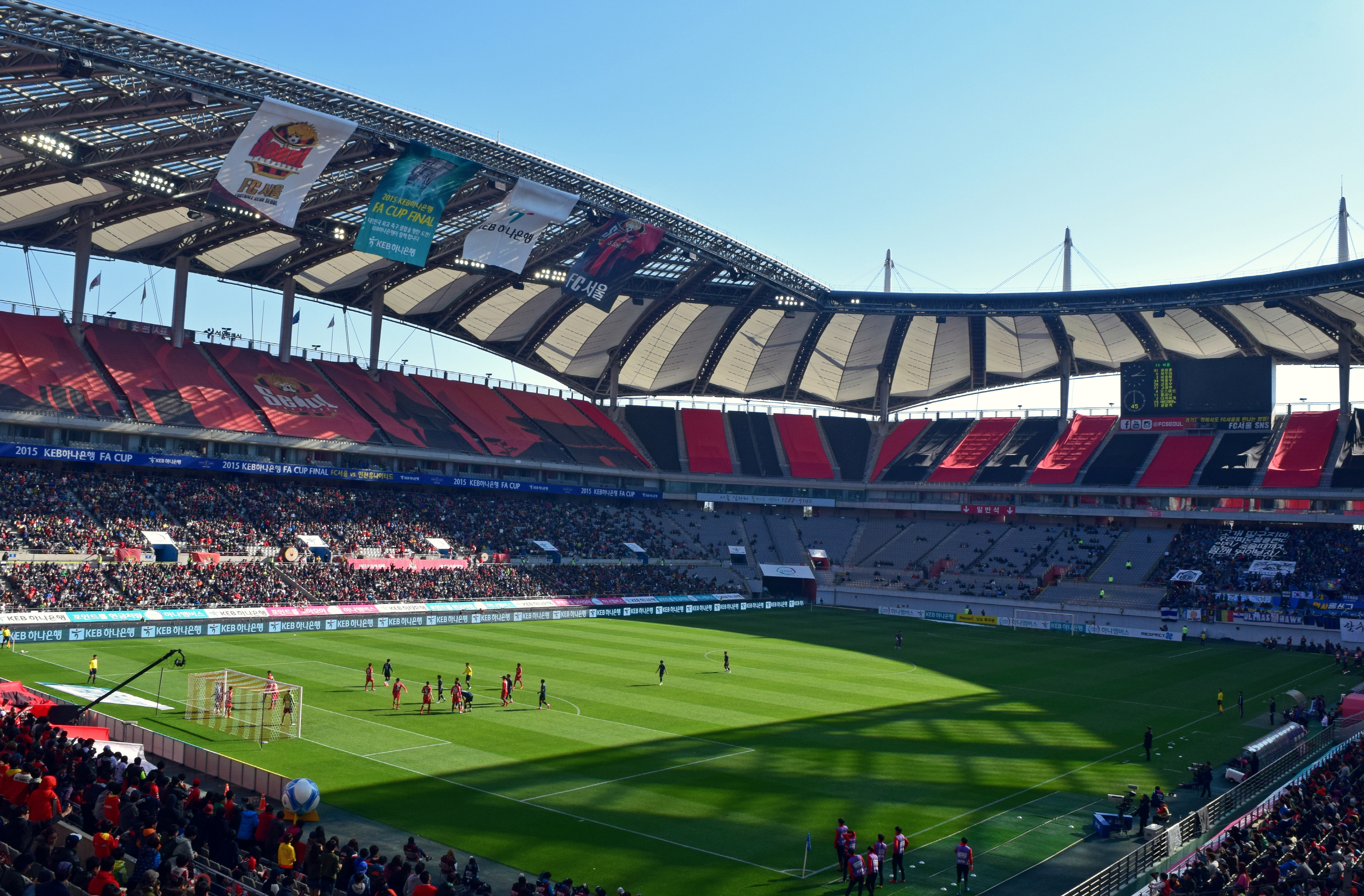
- Hongdae Hapjeong-dong Sogang University World Cup Park Yeonnam-dong Seoul World Cup Stadium

- Flag

- Location of Mapo District in Seoul
- Interactive map of Mapo
- Coordinates: 37.5638°N 126.9084°E
- Country: South Korea
- Region: Sudogwon
- Special City: Seoul
- Administrative dong: 24 (16 actual precincts)

Government
  - Body: Mapo-gu Council
  - Mayor: Yoo Dong-gyun (Democratic)
  - MNAs: List of MNAs: Cho Jung-hun (People Power); Jung Chung-rae (Democratic)

Area
  - Total: 23.87 km^{2} (9.22 sq mi)

Population (2015)
  - Total: 381,330
  - Density: 15,980/km^{2} (41,380/sq mi)
- Time zone: UTC+9 (Korea Standard Time)
- Postal code: 03900 – 04299
- Area code(s): +82-2 300,700,3150
- Website: Mapo District official website

Korean name
- Hangul: 마포구
- Hanja: 麻浦區
- RR: Mapo-gu
- MR: Map'o-gu

Mapo District (Korean: 마포구) is one of the 25 districts of Seoul, South Korea. Mapo has a population of 381,330 (2015) and has a geographic area of 23.87 km^{2} (9.22 sq mi), and is divided into 24 dong (administrative neighborhoods). Mapo is located in western Seoul on the northern bank of the Han River, bordering the Gyeonggi Province city of Goyang to the northwest, and the Seoul city districts of Gangseo to the west, Yeongdeungpo to the south, Yongsan to the southeast, Jung to the east, and Seodaemun and Eunpyeong to the north.

Mapo is home to several universities and government buildings, and is well known for the Hongdae club district around Hongik University. Mapo is connected to the Seoul Metropolitan Subway's Line 2, Line 5, and Line 6, as well as the Airport Railroad, and the Korail Gyeongui-Jungang Line, which all pass through this district. The Seoul World Cup Stadium, a famous landmark in Seoul, is located in Sangam in northwest Mapo.

== Etymology ==
The name "Mapo" comes from the name of an old ferry across the Han River, and can roughly be translated as "hemp ferry." Historically, Mapo was a significant ferry terminal of the Han River that facilitated transportation and commerce, especially of goods coming from the provinces in the south. Its geographical location rendered it one of the major landing points for grain and seafood during the Joseon Dynasty.

== History ==
Mapo-gu's historical roots can be traced back to the early Joseon Dynasty when the area fell under the jurisdiction of Hanseongbu, the capital administration. Though it lay within a short distance—about 10 li—from the city walls, it had not yet been formed into an independent administrative district. Later in the Joseon period, Hanseongbu expanded to include five new administrative regions: Dumobang, Hangangbang, Dunjibang, Yongsanbang, and Seogangbang. Parts of present-day Mapo-gu became included within the boundaries of Yongsanbang and Seogangbang.

During the Joseon period, Mapo held geographical and economic significance due to its location along the Han River. It served as a key river port and ferry crossing, situated near Ha-joongdo (modern-day Yeouido), linking to inland routes that led to places such as Siheung. Mapo was one of the "Five Ports of the Han River" (오강, 五江), alongside Ttukseom, Noryang, Yongsan, and Yanghwajin. These ports were central to unloading, storing, and redistributing goods that traveled via the Han River, which served as a vital transportation route through central Korea. Mapo, along with Yongsan and Yanghwajin, handled large quantities of grain from the southern provinces, as well as seafood like shrimp and croaker brought in from the Yellow Sea, making it a key hub in the redistribution of agricultural and marine products.

A major administrative shift occurred in 1910 under Japanese colonial rule. Hanseongbu was renamed Gyeongseongbu and placed under Gyeonggi-do's authority. The following year, it was granted official administrative status through Gyeonggi-do's ordinance. During this reorganization, Yongsanbang and Seogangbang were reclassified as Yongsan-myeon and Seogang-myeon, each overseeing numerous small districts.

Mapo's position as a transportation and commerce hub continued through the early years of the 20th century. In 1910, the first streetcar line of Seoul was extended from Seodaemun to Mapo, and it became an even more accessible and important ward. The new infrastructure heightened its role as a distribution point, particularly for seafood. But with the devastation of the streetcar system and closure of Han River transportation routes during the Korean War and peninsula division, Mapo lost much of its historical role as a hub of movement and commodity redistribution.

In 1913, another reorganization placed much of what we now consider Mapo-gu into the western portion of Gyeongseong-bu, while Seogang-myeon was incorporated into Goyang-gun, also within Gyeonggi Province. Over the next decades, administrative boundaries were adjusted several times. A significant development came on October 23, 1944, when parts of Seodaemun-gu and Yongsan-gu were separated to formally establish Mapo-gu as an independent district.

At the time of its founding, Mapo-gu comprised 23 towns, including names like Gongdeok-jeong, Ahyeon-jeong, Hapjeong-jeong, and Mangwon-jeong. Following Korea's liberation from Japanese rule in 1945 and the arrival of the U.S. military government, various administrative terms were updated—for instance, "jeong" became "dong," and district offices adopted new titles.

By 1955, further restructuring took place, streamlining the smaller districts into 19 administrative dongs such as Ahyeon 1-dong through 5-dong, Daeheung-dong, Singongdeok-dong, and others. Later adjustments in the 1980s, including those made in 1985 and 1989, redefined some neighborhood boundaries—for example, parts of Yonggang-dong were folded into Yeomri-dong, and segments of Mangwon-dong were reassigned to nearby Seogyo-dong and Hapjeong-dong.

== Mapo District Office ==
=== Location ===
Mapo District Office is located in Seongsan-2 precinct, near World Cup Stadium (5 minutes on foot). Seoul Metropolitan Subway Line 6 passes near the office, and it has a station name "Mapo-gu Office" 150 metres (490 ft) east of the office.

=== Organization ===
The district office has 5 Bureaus, 1 Community Health Center, 36 Divisions, 1 Room, 1 Task Force Team, 16 Community Service Centers. Mapo District Office employs about 1,300 personnels. The entire office is headed by Administrator. Current Administrator is Hong-seop Park (2017).

== Economy ==
Mapo District is one of the economically strong areas within Seoul. During Mayor Park Won-soon's administration, before the integration of acquisition and property taxes by Seoul's main office, Mapo's financial independence rate exceeded 50%. As of 2024, due to the impact of the integrated taxation of acquisition and property taxes, Mapo's financial independence rate has dropped to 28%.

An office district has developed around Gongdeok Station and the Digital Media City area, while large commercial districts have formed around Sinchon Station, Hongdae (Hongik University) Station, Hapjeong Station, and Mangwon Station. The economic strength of the area comes from the businesses and shops concentrated in these areas. In particular, the Hongdae Street area near Hongik University Station has grown into a major tourist destination since the 2020s, attracting visitors from around the world, with foreign consumer spending becoming a driving force of Mapo District's economy.

== Transport ==
It boasts excellent accessibility to both the central Jongno area and Yeongdeungpo/Yeouido districts. Gongdeok Station, in particular, has become a major transportation hub with the intersection of four different lines, causing real estate prices to skyrocket. Although the area, along with nearby Eunpyeong District and Seodaemun District, was notorious for haphazard development due to a lack of systematic planning since the 1960s, redevelopment efforts since the 2000s have elevated it to one of the top levels in Seoul's real estate market.

It is also part of the "Mayongseong" (Mapo, Yong-san, Seongdong) trio, a popular real estate term. The four subway lines are strategically located, providing excellent metro access throughout the district. Additionally, Hongdae (Hongik University) Station serves as a transfer point for Line 2, the Airport Railroad, and the Gyeongui-Jungang Line, while Hapjeong Station connects Lines 2 and 6, serving as a transit hub toward northwestern Gyeonggi Province.

== Education ==
Four college or university institutions, including Sogang University and Hongik University, are located within Mapo District. The area around Hongik University, also known as Hongdae, is well known as one of the cultural centers of Seoul, and was named one of the coolest neighborhoods in the world in 2016. There are eight high schools, including Seoul Girls' High School, along with 12 middle schools and 20 elementary schools serving the community. There are three special schools for disabled or industrial educations. Due to the presence of university students in the district, Mapo District offers a large variety of shopping and dining options.

International schools:

- Japanese School in Seoul in Sangam-dong

== Administrative divisions ==
Administrative divisions

Mapo District was formed in 1944 from portions of Seodaemun and Yongsan Districts. The dong (동) structure was revised in 1985 and 2008. Roughly 53% of Mapo District's area is taken up by residences, many of which are high-rise apartment buildings. Much of the remaining area (43%) is greenspace, including the World Cup Park and additional parkland along the Han River.

In the 2008 revamping of the precinct (dong) administration, some smaller precincts were merged to form larger precincts, effectively reducing the number of precinct administrative offices. As a result, the number of precinct offices decreased to 16 from 24. However, addresses remained the same.

These are the revamped administrative precincts:

- Gongdeok-dong (공덕동; 孔德洞)
- Ahyeon-dong (아현동; 阿峴洞)
- Dohwa-dong (도화동; 桃花洞)
- Daeheung-dong (대흥동; 大興洞)
- Yonggang-dong (용강동; 龍江洞)
- Hapjeong-dong (합정동; 合井洞)
- Seogyo-dong (서교동; 西橋洞)
- Seogang-dong (서강동; 西江洞)
- Sinsu-dong (신수동; 新水洞)
- Yeomni-dong (염리동; 鹽里洞)
- Yeonnam-dong (연남동; 延南洞)
- Mangwon-1-dong (망원1동; 望遠1洞)
- Mangwon-2-dong (망원2동; 望遠2洞)
- Seongsan-1-dong (성산1동; 城山1洞)
- Seongsan-2-dong (성산2동; 城山2洞)
- Sangam-dong (상암동; 上岩洞)

== Sister cities ==
- Shijingshan, China

== Notable ==
- (South Korea) Lee Jae-hwang
