= Sinchon =

Region of Seoul, South Korea

Coordinates: 37.555270°N 126.937412°E

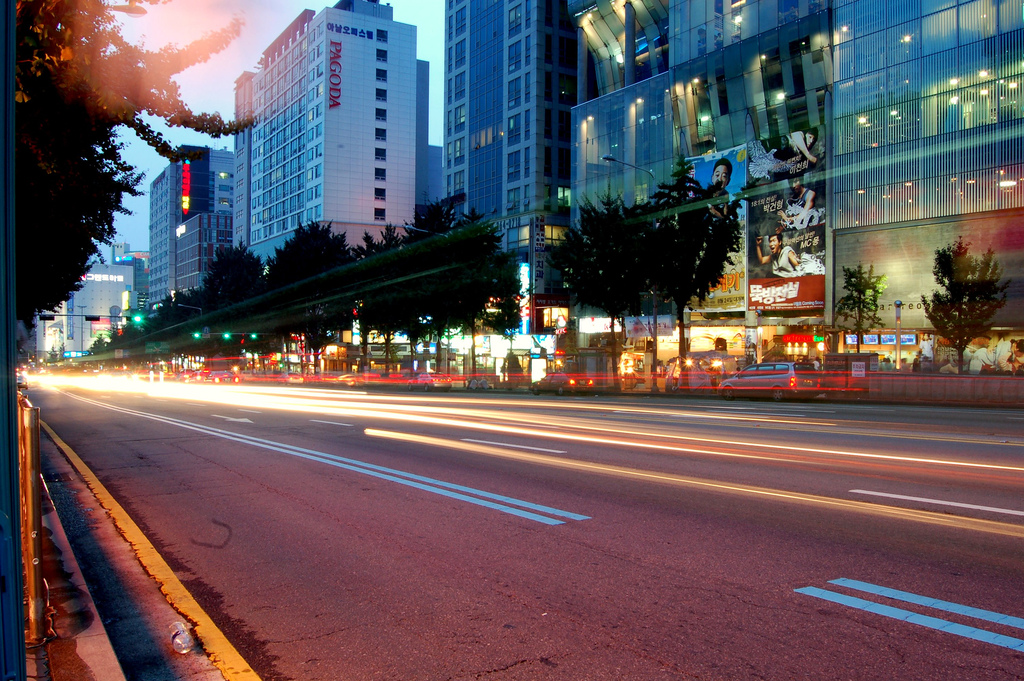

Korean name
- Hangul: 신촌
- Hanja: 新村
- RR: Sinchon
- MR: Sinch'on

Sinchon (Korean: 신촌) is a region of South Korea surrounding Sinchon-dong, Changcheon-dong, Nogosan-dong and Daeheung-dong. It is known for its numerous universities including Yonsei University, Ewha Womans University, Sogang University, Hongik University, as well as its vibrant nightlife.

== Transport ==
The area is served by subway via Sinchon station. Also, various Seoul bus lines reach the street.

== Shopping ==
The biggest shopping mall in Sinchon station is Hyundai Department Store, which includes 8 Seconds, a Korean SPA brand, PEER, a Korean select shop, Espoir, VDL, both Korean cosmetic brands, and the other fashion and cosmetic brands. Notable Korean cosmetic stores include The Face Shop, The Saem, Aritaum, Etude House, Memebox and Innisfree.
