= Yonggang-dong, Seoul =

Yonggang-dong
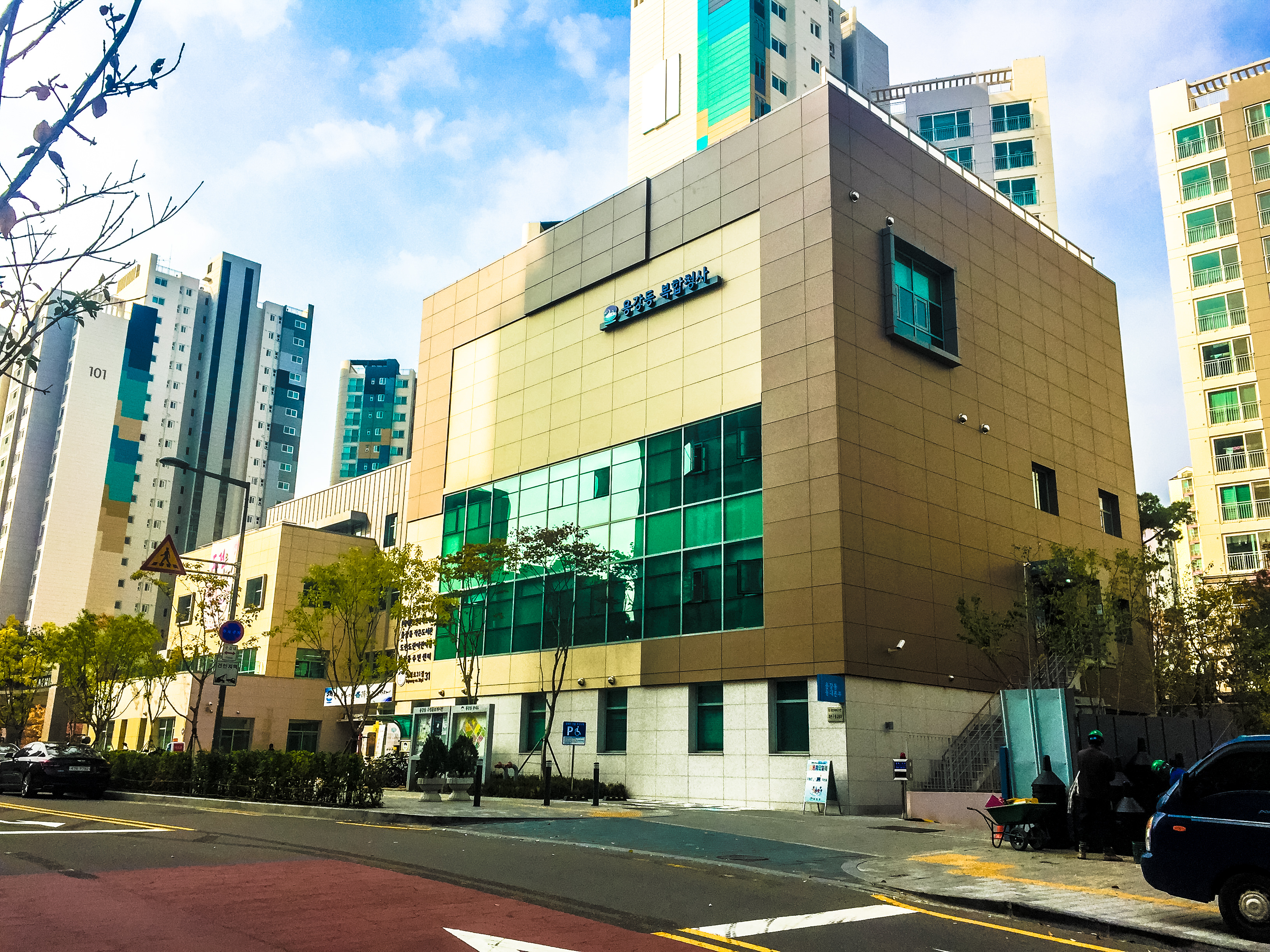
- Yonggang-dong community center
- Interactive map of Yonggang-dong
- Country: South Korea

Area
  - Total: 0.66 km^{2} (0.25 sq mi)

Population (2001)
  - Total: 10,710
  - Density: 16,000/km^{2} (42,000/sq mi)

Korean name
- Hangul: 용강동
- Hanja: 龍江洞
- RR: Yonggang-dong
- MR: Yonggang-dong

Yonggang-dong (Korean: 용강동) is a dong (neighbourhood) of Mapo District, Seoul, South Korea.

== History ==
Yonggang-dong was named after Yonggang-myeon, Goyang-gun, and it was named according to the Fengshui Geography that Mapo River is like a dragon's head. Mapo-dong originated because of the existence of Maponaru, and on April 1, 1914, Gyeongseongbu abolished the five-member 8 exemption, and part of Mapo-dong was designated as Dohwa-dong, and others were made Mapo-dong. The name of Tojeong-dong is derived from the fact that Ji-ham Lee, famous for his secret of Tojeong, built a pavilion out of soil. On October 1, 1946, it became Yonggang-dong, Mapo District. On April 18, 1955, the name was changed to Gwanran-dong, and on May 18, 1970, it became Yonggang-dong again.

== Dong prescribed by law ==
- Yonggang-dong
- Tojeong-dong
- Mapo-dong
- Dohwa-dong
- Daeheung-dong
- Yeomni-dong

== See also ==
- Administrative divisions of South Korea
