= Sinchon station =

Metro station on Seoul Metro Line 2

신촌 (지하); Sinchon
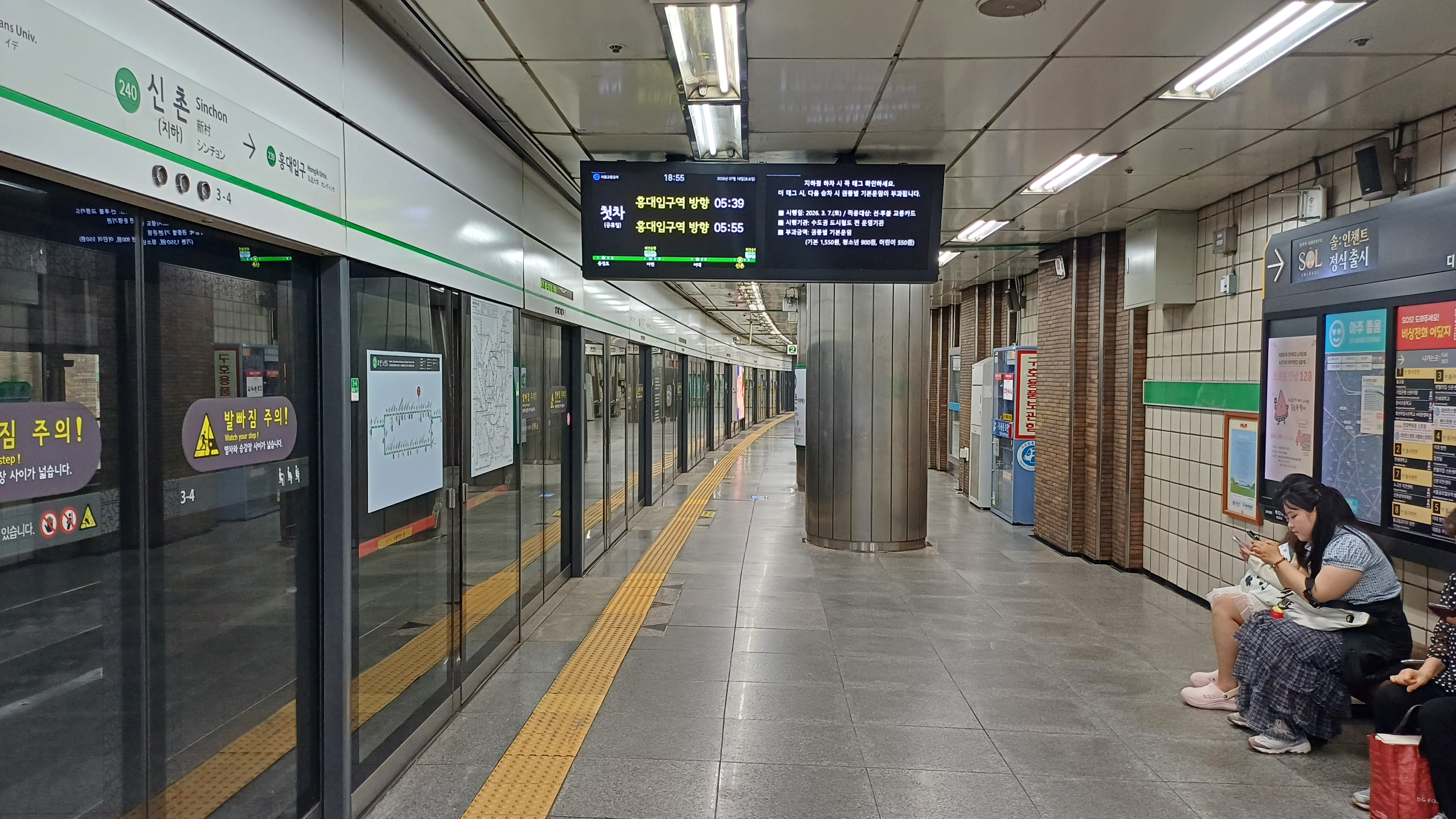

Korean name
- Hangul: 신촌역
- Hanja: 新村驛
- RR: Sinchon-yeok
- MR: Sinch'on-yŏk

General information
- Location: 90 Sinchon-ro Jiha, 31-11 Nogosan-dong, Mapo-gu, Seoul
- Coordinates: 37°33′19″N 126°56′13″E
- Operator: Seoul Metro
- Line: Line 2
- Platforms: 2
- Tracks: 2

Construction
- Structure type: Underground

History
- Opened: May 22, 1984

Passengers
- (Daily) Based on Jan-Dec of 2012. Line 2: 111,885

Services
Preceding station	Seoul Metropolitan Subway	Following station
Hongik University Next counterclockwise	Line 2	Ewha Womans University Next clockwise
Location

Sinchon station is a station on Line 2 of the Seoul Metropolitan Subway in Mapo-gu, north of the Han River. It is located between Hongik University station and Ewha Womans University station.

It is the closest station to Sogang University, Yonsei University, Hyundai Department Store Sinchon, and Seoul Korea Temple. The area between the station and the front gate of Yonsei University is known simply as Sinchon-dong, and is a mecca of nightlife in Seoul, being packed with restaurants, pubs and bars that draw young adults from all over. This station is also in the vicinity of a bus terminal offering service to cities in northwestern Gyeonggi province, including Ilsan, Gimpo, and Ganghwa.

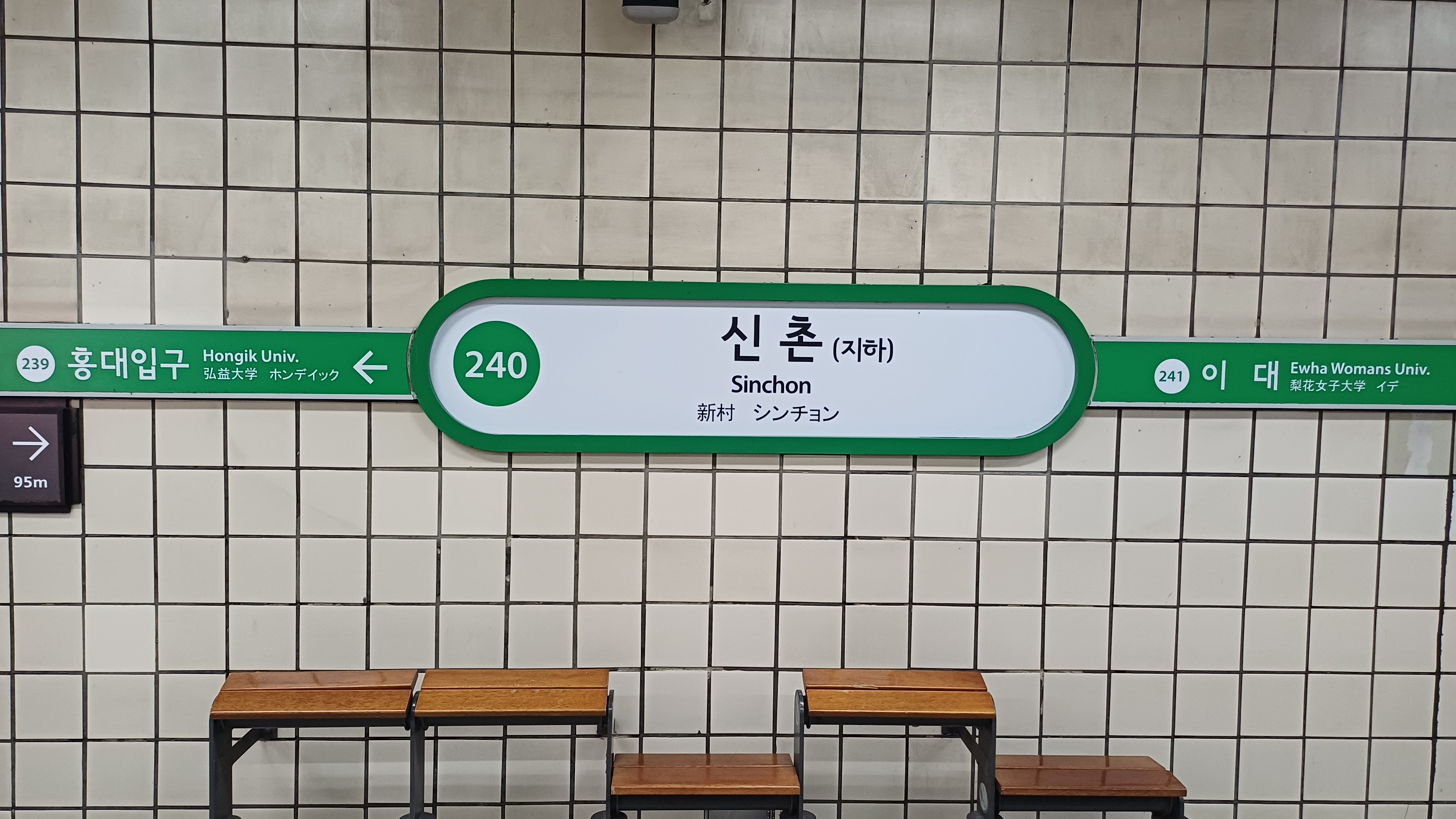

== Station layout ==
G	Street level	Exit

L1; Concourse	Lobby	Customer Service, Shops, Vending machines, ATMs

L2; Platform level	Side platform, doors will open on the right
L2; Platform level	Outer circle	← Line 2 Next counterclockwise (Hongik University)
L2; Platform level	Inner circle	Line 2 Next clockwise (Ewha Womans University) →
L2; Platform level	Side platform, doors will open on the right
