= Baik Sou-linne =

South Korean author (born 1982)

Baik Sou Linne
- Born: 1982 (age 43–44); Incheon
- Education: Yonsei University; Sogang University
- Occupation: writer
- Writing career
- Language: Korean
- Period: modern
- Notable work: Time Difference
- Notable awards: Kyunghyang Shinmun Spring Literary Contest, Munhakdongne Young Writer Award

Korean name
- Hangul: 백수린
- Hanja: 白秀麟
- RR: Baek Surin
- MR: Paek Surin

Sou Linne Baik (Note: This romanization is preferred by the author according to LTI Korea) (Korean: 백수린; born 1982) is a female South Korean author.

== Early life ==
Baik was born in 1982 in Incheon, South Korea. She majored in French at Yonsei University. She graduated from Sogang University but still had the desire to write, and started to practice writing after that. She became a published author after being selected in the novel category of the 2010 Kyunghyang Shinmun Annual Spring Literary Contest.

== Career ==
Baik began writing novellas with Lying Practice ("거짓말 연습") and published a collection of short story novels in her book Falling in Paul ("폴링 인 폴"). She believes that she lacks skills as a writer because she is unlike many others who took all the steps to become a writer.

Baik's book Falling in Paul (폴링 인 폴) is a collection of nine stories about issues of language and memory. It portrays how we take in other people's desperate love stories as something typical and the writer also wants her readers to realize this. Another thing Baik discusses in this story is the romanization of the titular character Paul's Korean name Junchan, a name which Baik believes is difficult for foreign people to pronounce. Baik's point is that the pronunciation of the name will always be different from how Paul says it and how Koreans do.

Baik's work often depends on identity. The writer says that people see her writings as an art of traditional grammar and she wishes this writing style to get stronger in the future. She also wants to have her stories to be less packed in the future for she feels like there is too much words being said. Lastly, she hopes that her readers will understand her intentions and meaning behind her books.

She is currently serializing a novel in the Hankyoreh newspaper.

In 2016, Baik's next book Terrible Light (unofficial name; 참담한 빛), a collection of ten short stories, was released by Changbi Publishers. The short stories therein deal with themes of past suffering and of emigrants living in foreign countries, and use intense light as a metaphor for exploration of suffering. Some stories deal with public tragedies, such as "Summer Noon" (여름의 정오) which touches on the Tokyo subway sarin attack and the September 11 attacks, while others touch on private suffering which the author nevertheless connects to wider suffering in the world, such as "First Love" (첫사랑) in which the first-person narrator goes to study abroad in Russia but then witnesses the school's decision to close the faculty and how the other students react.

Baik has one work translated into English by Asia Publisher, titled "Time Difference" and was one of four featured speakers (along with Lee Ki-ho, Lee Jang-wook and Geum Hee) at a bilingual author's roundtable in Myeongdong, Seoul in December 2015

Baik's work has received praise from critics including professor Kim Yun-shik of Seoul National University.

== Works ==
- 폴링 인 폴 [Falling in Paul]. Munhak Dongne. 2014. ISBN 9788954623902. OCLC 881319598.
- 시차 [Time Difference]. Asia Publishers. 2015. ISBN 9791156621256.
- 참담한 빛 [Terrible Light]. Changbi Publishers. 2016. ISBN 9788936437428. OCLC 975764673.

=== Works in translation ===
- Time Difference. Translated by Jeon Miseli. Asia Publishers. 2015. OCLC 922007559. (English)

== Awards ==
- Kyunghyang Sinmun Spring Literary Contest (2011, for "Lying Practice")
- Munhakdongne Young Writer Award (2015, for "Falling in Paul")
