= Sinchon-dong, Seoul =

Neighborhood in Seoul, South Korea

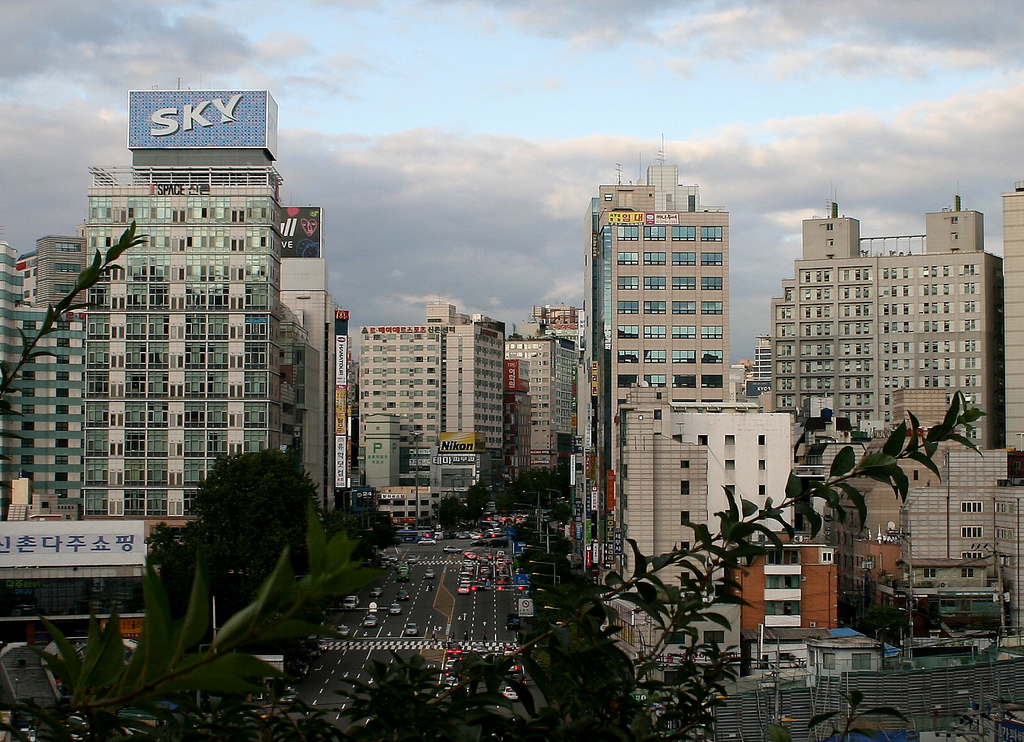

Korean name
- Hangul: 신촌동
- Hanja: 新村洞
- RR: Sinchon-dong
- MR: Sinch'on-dong

Sinchon-dong (Korean: 신촌동) is a neighbourhood and a judicial (as opposed to administrative) dong (법정동) in Seodaemun District, Seoul, South Korea.

Sinchon's main attraction is its nightlife, with numerous bars of both western style and traditional Korean hofs, restaurants, and other activities aimed at the area's student population.

== Transport ==
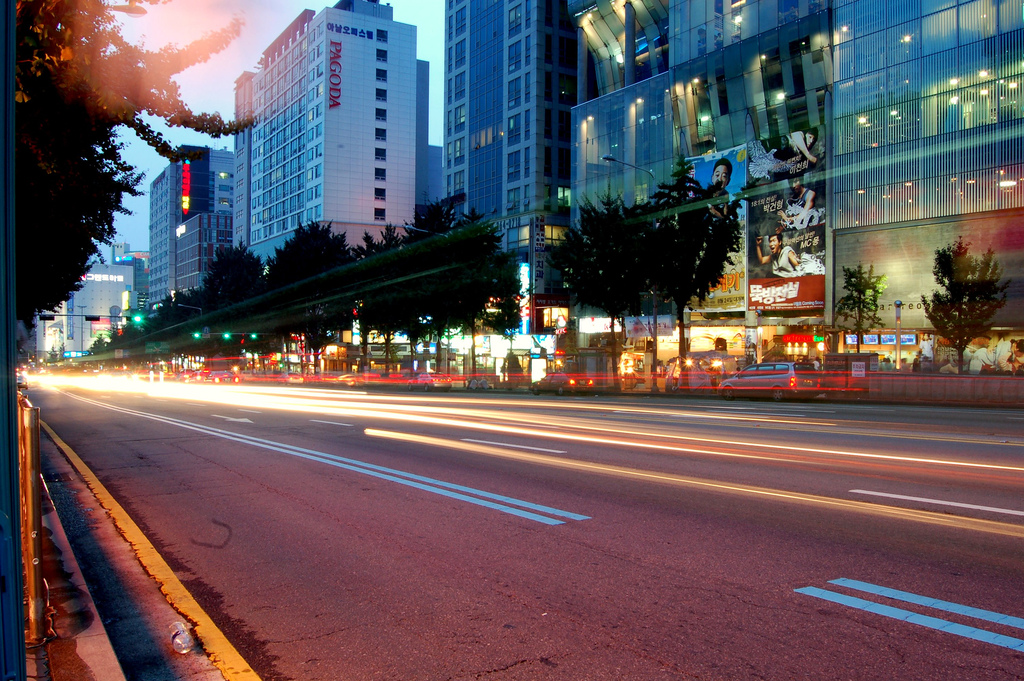
A street in the Sinchon area

Sinchon Station is located on Seoul Subway Line 2 between Ewha Womans University Station and Hongik University Station.

Sinchon Station is also the name of a station on the Gyeongui Line which connects Seoul and Dorasan. Sinchon is the line's second station, located between Seoul Station and Gajwa Station.

The main bus station/terminal is located near the police station about 100m south (towards Yeouido) from Sinchon Rotary. Bus number 110A goes to Itaewon and can be caught near Hyundai dept. store.

The first transit mall in Seoul and only second in the nation following one in Daegu, opened on Sinchon-ro in January 2014. The vehicle street has shrunk from four lanes to two and the sidewalks and pedestrian areas were greatly enlarged. With rare exceptions, the street is only for 15+ seater buses, pedestrians, and cyclists.

== Attractions ==
Sinchon is a busy area of the city and holds several department stores, cinemas and shopping areas that cater mainly to a young crowd. Also in the vicinity are several universities such as Yonsei University, Ewha Womans University, Hongik University, Sogang University and Myongji University. Sinchon is also one of the major entertainment districts with bars, karaoke rooms, PC-rooms, DVD rooms, Korean billiards halls and restaurants lining the streets covered in neon lights at night. One of Korea's largest hospitals, Severance Hospital, is linked with Yonsei University in Sinchon.

Hyundai Department Store is located here as well as the Uplex, which is connected to the Hyundai Department Store via an above ground walkway.

== In popular culture ==
The streets and area around Ewha Womans University was used as a filming location for Seoul Broadcasting System's 2001 drama Beautiful Days, starring Lee Byung-hun, Choi Ji-woo, Ryu Si-won, Shin Min-a, Lee Jung-hyun and Lee Yoo-jin.

== International cooperation ==
- Kragujevac, Serbia
