= Yonggang-dong =

Yonggang-dong may refer to

- Yonggang-dong, Gangneung
- Yonggang-dong, Gwangju
- Yonggang-dong, Gyeongju
- Yonggang-dong, Sacheon
- Yonggang-dong, Seoul
