= Almas Heshmati =

Almas Heshmati is a Swedish-Kurdish economist. Currently, he is professor of economics at Sogang University and Jönköping International Business School. He is a member of IZA, the Bonn-based Institute for the Study of Labour..

His publications include papers in the American Journal of Agricultural Economics, Econometric Reviews, Economic Theory, Empirical Economics, European Journal of Operational Research, Global Economy Journal, Journal of Applied Econometrics, Journal of Economic Surveys, Journal of the World System Research, Scandinavian Journal of Economics, and the Scandinavian Journal of Educational Research.

IDEAS and REPEC list Prof. Heshmati among the top 1% global economists according to these criteria:

- Average Rank Score
- Number of Works
- Number of Distinct Works
- Number of Distinct Works, Weighted by Number of Authors
- Number of Journal Pages
- Number of Journal Pages, Weighted by Number of Authors
- Number of Abstract Views in RePEc Services over the past 12 months
- Number of Downloads through RePEc Services over the past 12 months
- Number of Abstract Views in RePEc Services over the past 12 months, Weighted by Number of Authors
- Number of Downloads through RePEc Services over the past 12 months, Weighted by Number of Authors

In February 2010, Prof. Heshmati was listed as global economist Rank Number 287, and number 2 in the Republic of Korea.
