= Sogang University =

University in Seoul, South Korea

- 서강대학교
- Former names: Sogang College (SC) (1960–1970)
- Motto: Obedire Veritati (Latin) 진리에 순종하라
- Motto in English: "Obey the Truth"
- Type: Private research university
- Established: April 18, 1960; 66 years ago
- Accreditation: AACSB
- Religious affiliation: Roman Catholic (Society of Jesus)
- Academic affiliations: ACUCA; AJCU-AP
- Chairman: Fr. Park Mun-su (Francis Xavier Buchmeier), S.J.
- President: Sim Jong-hyeok (심종혁)
- Faculty: 413 (Full-time); 817 (Part-time)
- Administrative staff: 314
- Students: 11,792 (2023)
- Undergraduates: 8,100 (2023)
- Postgraduates: 3,692 (2023)
- Location: 35 Baekbeom-ro, Mapo, Seoul, South Korea; 37°33′04″N 126°56′28″E
- Campus: 59.6 acres (24.1 ha); Urban
- Colors: Sogang cardinal Silver
- Mascot: Albatross
- Website: www.sogang.ac.kr

Korean name
- Hangul: 서강대학교
- Hanja: 西江大學校
- Lit.: West River University
- RR: Seogang daehakgyo
- MR: Sŏgang taehakkyo

Sogang University (SU; Korean: 서강대학교) is a private Jesuit research university in Mapo, Seoul, South Korea. Sogang University was established on April 18, 1960 by the Society of Jesus, with the school being the oldest and only Jesuit institution of higher education in the country. It is widely regarded as one of South Korea's most prestigious universities. It was founded at the initiative of the Catholic Hierarchy of Korea, after Pope Pius XII gave assurance that a Catholic institution of higher learning would be established on the territory of Korea.

Sogang has a variety of undergraduate, graduate, and doctorate programs. The university offers 27 undergraduate departments in 9 schools alongside a multiple major system with more than 600 major combinations, a graduate school, which is equipped with 25 departments and 5 interdisciplinary programs that offer master's and Ph.D. programs, 6 professional graduate schools, and 5 special graduate programs.

Currently, Sogang has joint academic agreements with over 370 partner universities in 65 countries, which includes Catholic and Jesuit institutions. It hosts about 300 incoming exchange students and sends 200 outgoing exchange students every semester. Sogang offers international students various international programs, such as the International Summer Program, also known as the Sogang International Summer Program (SISP), STEM Lab Internship Program, Korean Language Programs, which operate under the Sogang University Korean Language Education Center (Sogang KLEC), Service Learning Program, and other short-term programs.

== History ==
=== Beginnings ===
In 1948, Pope Pius XII entrusted the task to establish a Catholic institution of higher education to the Society of Jesus. In October 1954 Jesuit Fr. Theodore Geppert, S.J. from Sophia University of Tokyo came to Korea in search of a suitable site to establish a Jesuit college. In February 1955 Jean-Baptiste Janssens, S.J., the twenty-seventh Superior General of the Society of Jesus, assigned the task of establishing the college to the Wisconsin Province of Jesuits. Fr. Leo Burns, SJ, Superior of the Wisconsin Province of the Society of Jesus, came to Korea and, with the Korean Catholic hierarchy, began negotiations with the Syngman Rhee government for the establishment of a liberal arts college. In January 1957 the Society of Jesus purchased a property of 67,075 pyong (217,323 sq. meters, 53 acres) at Nogosan-dong, Sinsu-dong, Mapo-gu, Seoul. The site was prepared for construction of an Administration Building, which was completed in November 1959. Sogang College was opened in 1960 and was granted research university status in 1970.

=== Development ===
In February 1970, Complex of Mary Hall was opened on the territory of the university, which was granted the status of a research university the same year. Mary Hall became the first university theatre of South Korea. The 10th anniversary of the university, which was held on April 18 and attended by cardinal Kim Soo-hwan, was hosted on the grounds of the complex. In December 1973, the establishment of Loyola Library, which was the first library of its kind in Korea to have a fully open system as well as a reference inquiry system took place. The library has over 1,000,000 books and 6,000 kinds of periodicals, over 40,000 reference materials, various kinds of microforms, audio visual materials and various kinds of digital materials. The same year, the Department of Diplomacy was opened, alongside an opening of a doctoral program in graduate school.

In October 1980, the university opened its gymnasium for usage. The gym has a total floor area of 5,632 m^{2} and can accommodate about 3,500 spectators. It has volleyball and basketball courts, 3 teaching rooms, an office, a classroom, 14 student clubs, and 3 table tennis courts. In March 1981, the departments of Business Administration, International Trade, and Accounting were integrated into the Department of Business Administration. Department of Diplomacy would change its name to the Department of Political Science and Diplomacy. The establishment of the departments of French Language and Literature, Religious Studies, Sociology, and Computer Science also took place. The 1979 Nobel Peace Prize Laureate Mother Teresa visited Sogang in May 1981 and gave addresses in the auditorium and at the basketball court, appealing for all to practice a charity that is universal. In 1984, the Korean Catholic Church celebrated its bicentennial. For the celebration, Pope John Paul II visited Korea on May 5, meeting with priests along with men and women religious in the gymnasium and with Korean intellectuals in the auditorium.

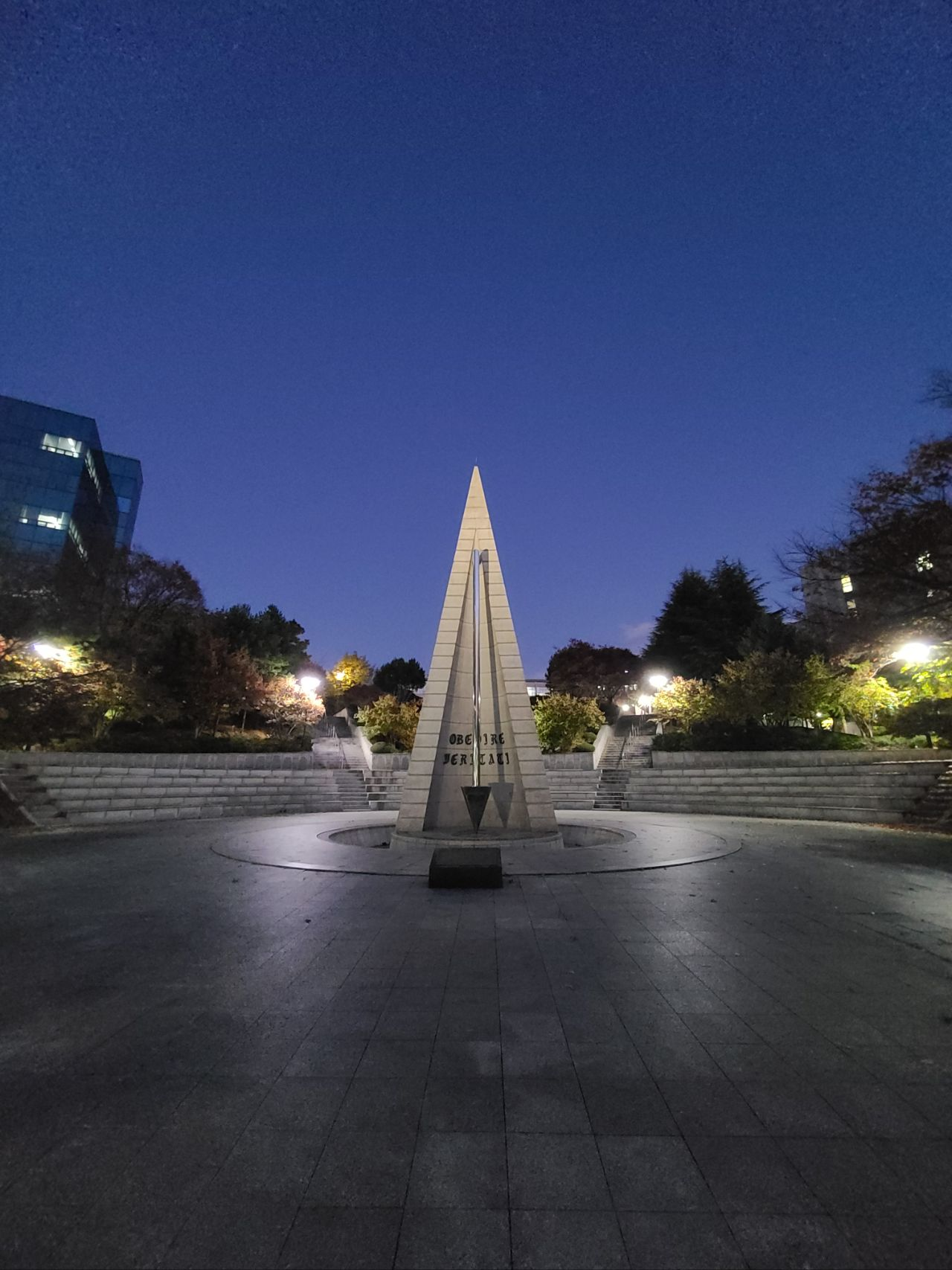
Albatross Tower, symbol of Sogang University, opened on the 30th anniversary of the university

In April 1990, the university unveiled its new symbol, Albtaross Tower, located near the main gate of the campus. Albatross, is named after the bird of the same name, and is shaped in the image of the first two letter of Sogang written in Hangul, "ㅅ" and "ㄱ." The design of the tower was made by the alumni association, to commemorate the 30th anniversary of Sogang University. The words "Obedire Veritati", which serve as the official motto of Sogang, can be seen on the lower central part of the tower. November 1994 saw the opening of the second student center, Emmaus Hall. Its name, Emmaus, comes from the name of the town located approximately 7 miles (11 km) northwest of Jerusalem, which has significant meaning as the place for meeting Jesus. Its name is also mentioned in Gospel of Luke, at Luke (24:13-35).

From 2010 to 2019, Sogang University underwent great changes in its academic programs, campus facilities, cultural events, and institutional recognition. In April 2010, Sogang University's 50th anniversary was celebrated with a ceremony and the inauguration of the Graduate School of Management of Technology (MOT). In May, the first Sogang Miracle Theater Festival was held, and in November, SOFEX 2010 (Sogang-Sophia Festival of Exchange) was hosted. SOFEX 2010 marked the first international college-level sports exchange between Korea and Japan. Sogang University also received the Presidential Award in the education category at the National Quality Management Convention.

In 2011, the university continued to promote athletic and cultural exchanges, holding the first Sogang University–Seoul National University Sports Exchange Tournament and the second Sogang Miracle Theater Festival in May. September saw the completion of Jeong Hansang Hall and Teilhard Hall, two 12-story buildings covering an area of nearly 30,000 square meters. Later that year, SOFEX 2011 was held in October. The following year, in March 2012, Sogang University established the School of Integrated Knowledge and completed the construction of Thomas More Hall. October was marked by the third editions of both SOFEX and the Miracle Theater Festival. In January 2013, the university completed POSCO Francisco Hall, and in March Yoo Ki-pung was inaugurated as the university’s 14th president. November saw the fourth SOFEX and Miracle Theater Festival, while December featured the university’s vision proclamation ceremony, titled ‘Sogang Night of Recreation.’

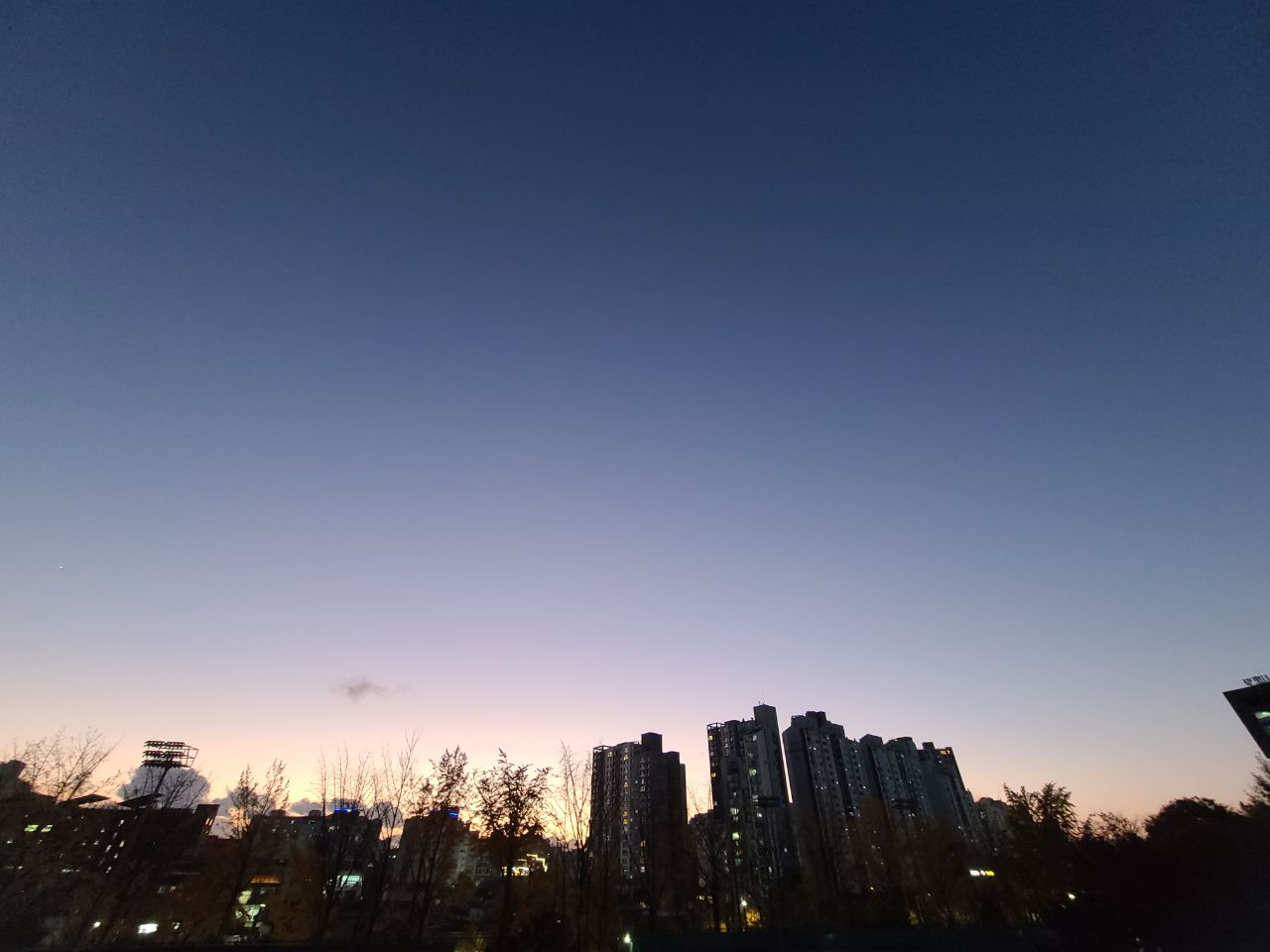
View from the Sogang University campus at dusk

In August 2014, the construction of Berchmans Woojung Hall (BW Hall) was completed. That November, the fifth SOFEX was held. The following year, in June 2015, Sogang University was selected as the first university recognized by the Korean Standard-Service Quality Index (KS-SQI) of the Korean Standards Association. It was also reselected as an Advanced College of Education (ACE) in July. The sixth SOFEX took place in November 2015. In March 2016, the university was selected as a leading institution for the international cooperation support project and chosen for the ‘Initiative for College of Humanities’ Research and Education (CORE). By May, it had received top evaluations for the Small & Medium Business Administration Business Incubator Center for the fifth consecutive year, a streak that continued through 2017.

In March 2018, the university established the School of Media, Arts, and Science. May featured the first Sogang Presidential Performance Competition, ‘Sogang Miracle 4-passion.’ In August, Sogang University was designated as a Self-Improvement University through the University Basic Competency Assessment. The university maintained its position as the top-ranked institution on the KS-SQI for the fifth consecutive year in October 2018 and was selected as a Hub University for supporting career development for students with disabilities in November. In April 2019, the university entered the University Innovation Support Project under the Autonomous Agreement Type. The second Sogang Presidential Performance Competition was held in May, and in October 2019, Sogang University ranked first on the KS-SQI for six consecutive years, solidifying its reputation for service quality in education.

During World Youth Day 2027, which is to be held in Seoul, Sogang University will host the "Magis" program of the Jesuits as part of the "Days in the diocese". The basecamp for all activities, the "Villa Magis", will be directly located on the campus.

== Campus ==
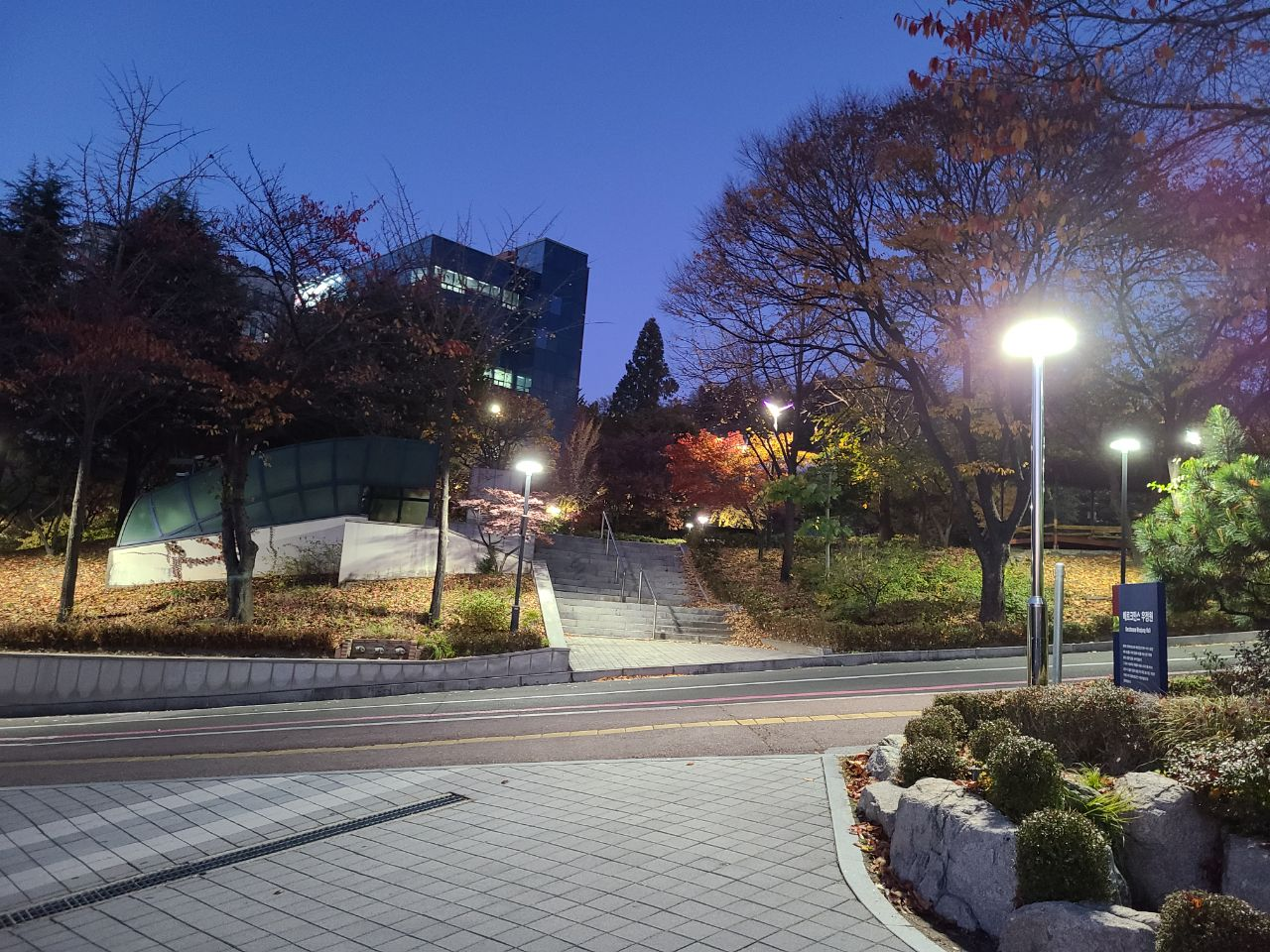
Sogang University campus

Campus of Sogang University is located in Mapo District of the capital city of South Korea, Seoul, at 35 Baekbeom-ro. Its positioned in Sinchon, an area of Seoul which is known for its high concentration of universities. The campus is located in three administrative districts of Mapo-gu: Nogosan-dong, Daeheung-dong, and Sinsu-dong. It has a total area of 59.6 acres, or approximately 242,091 square meters. The area of the campus is home to 36 buildings, which includes restaurants, plazas, halls, students centers etc. These include buildings such as the Administration Building, Arrupe Hall, Gonzaga Hall, Berchmans Woojung Hall, Geppert-Nam Duck Woo Hall, and many more. Sogang University station is also present within walking distance of the university, serving as a major access point for the university students to reach the campus.

=== Campus facilities ===
Located on a hill, Loyola Library was established in 1973, with a total area of 13,901 square meters. It became the first university library in Korea to include a reference inquiry system, as well as an automated loan and return operations system. Its second building was completed in 1982, followed up by the construction of a third building in 1997. In 2010, the library opened a U-dream Hall, a complex space for exhibitions and events. As part of the Sinchon University exchange agreement, students of Soganag University are able to enter the Yonsei University Central Library, Ewha Women's University Central Library, and Hongik University Central Library by presenting their Sogang University student ID.

Name of the place comes from Saint Aloysius Gonzaga, also known as Aloysius de Gonzaga. He became the member of Society of Jesus in 1585, and was canonized by Pope Benedict XIII on December 31, 1726. He was also named "Patron of all Christian youth" by Pope Pius XI in 1926. The underground campus of the Hall, known as Gonzaga Plaza, was finished on August 25, 2008. It consists of 3 basement floors and a ground floor, with a total area of 1,912 square meters. Total size of Gonzaga Hall is 6,734 square meters. The campus also features a parking facility for 585 cars, restaurants, a convenience store, coffee shops, a food court and more. The parking facility has an entrance and exit control management system, which is able to record and store data of the total number of cars entering the campus.

Matthew Hall was completed in August 2001. It is named after Saint Matthew, a Christian evangelist, tax collector, and an apostle from the Roman Empire. He was also one of the 12 apostles of Jesus. Matthew the Apostle is also known as the author of the first Gospel of the New Testament. He preached the message of God, and was martyred in Ethiopia. With a total floor area of 16,246 square meters, it houses the Faculty of Business Administration, Graduate School, and Graduate School of Business Administration. Matthew Hall is facilitated with air conditioning and heating systems. The building also includes a library of latest style, alongside a video conference room accompanied by a wide reception hall for international conferences.

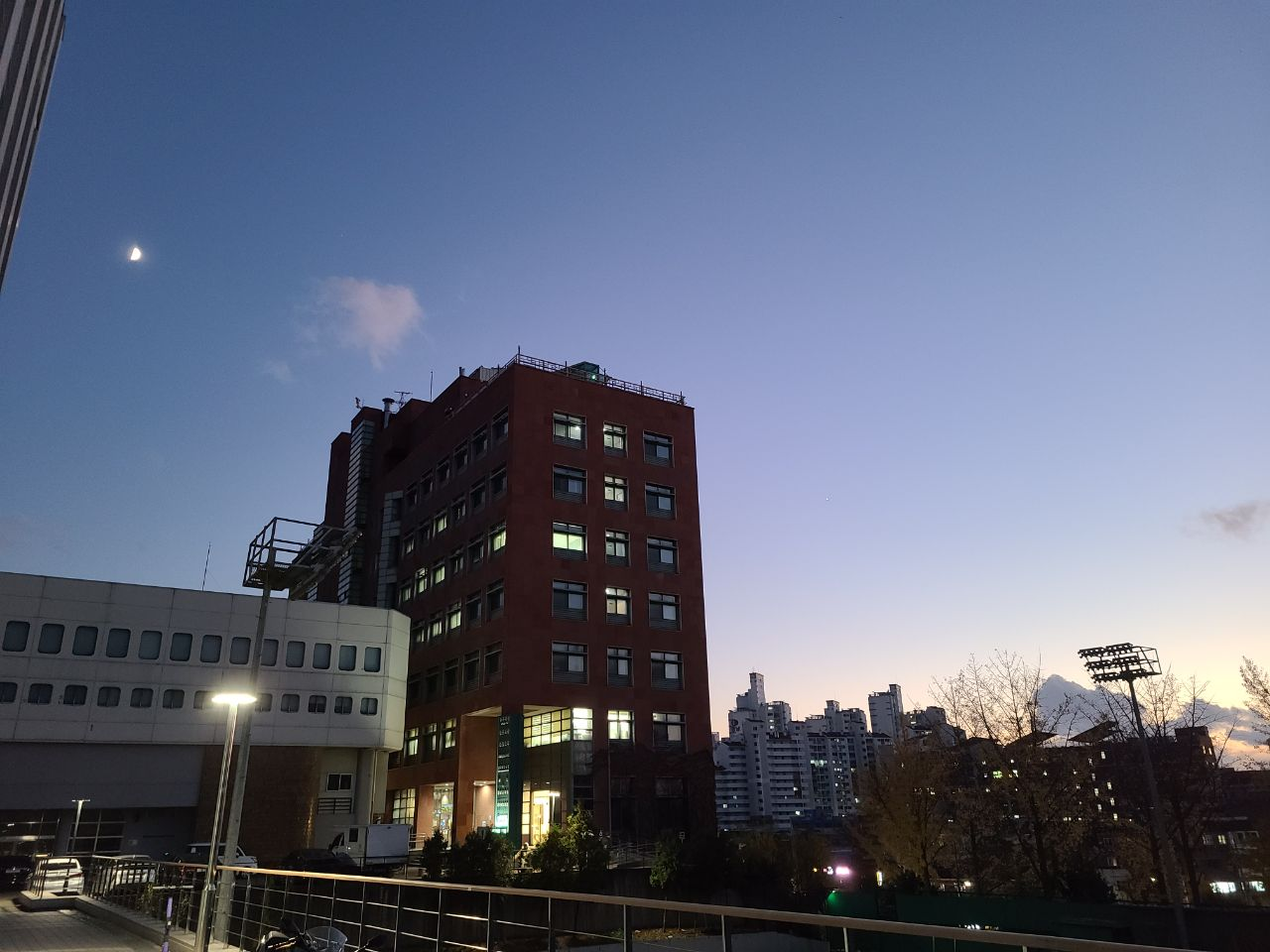
Arrupe Hall

Arrupe Hall was named after Pedro Arrupe, 28th Superior General of the Society of Jesus, who was also known as "Second Ignatius", a refounder of the Society in light of the Second Vatican Council, which was a name given to him by a fellow friend and advisor, Jesuit Vincent O'Keefe. The hall was completed in October 2002. It consists of a basement floor, 11 ground floors with a total area of 8,462 square meters, an Admissions Office, University Museum, Institute for International Culture & Education, Alumni Association, a bank, a wedding hall, and a restaurant.

Bellarmine Dormitory was completed in February 2003, with a total area of 3,808 m^{2} on nine floors above ground and one underground floor, it can accommodate 336 people. The dormitory was named in honor of Saint Roberto Bellarmine, widely regarded as of the most outstanding theologians of his time, as well as a defender of the Church. Bellarmine became a member of the Society of Jesus at a very young age, and in the year 1560, he first preached as a priest. When Pope Clement VIII appointed Bellarmine as a cardinal, he said, "I have chosen this man, because in the Church of God, there is no one who can equal him in learning."

Saint Ignatius House was named to commemorate Saint Ignatius of Loyola, the founder of the Society of Jesus, who ultimately became the first Superior General of the Society of Jesus (Jesuit Order). The total area of the building is about 4,058 square meters. The building has a cathedral, and is used as a pastoral center by Catholic Christians in the Shinchon area of Seoul. It is also equipped with a 500-seater auditorium.

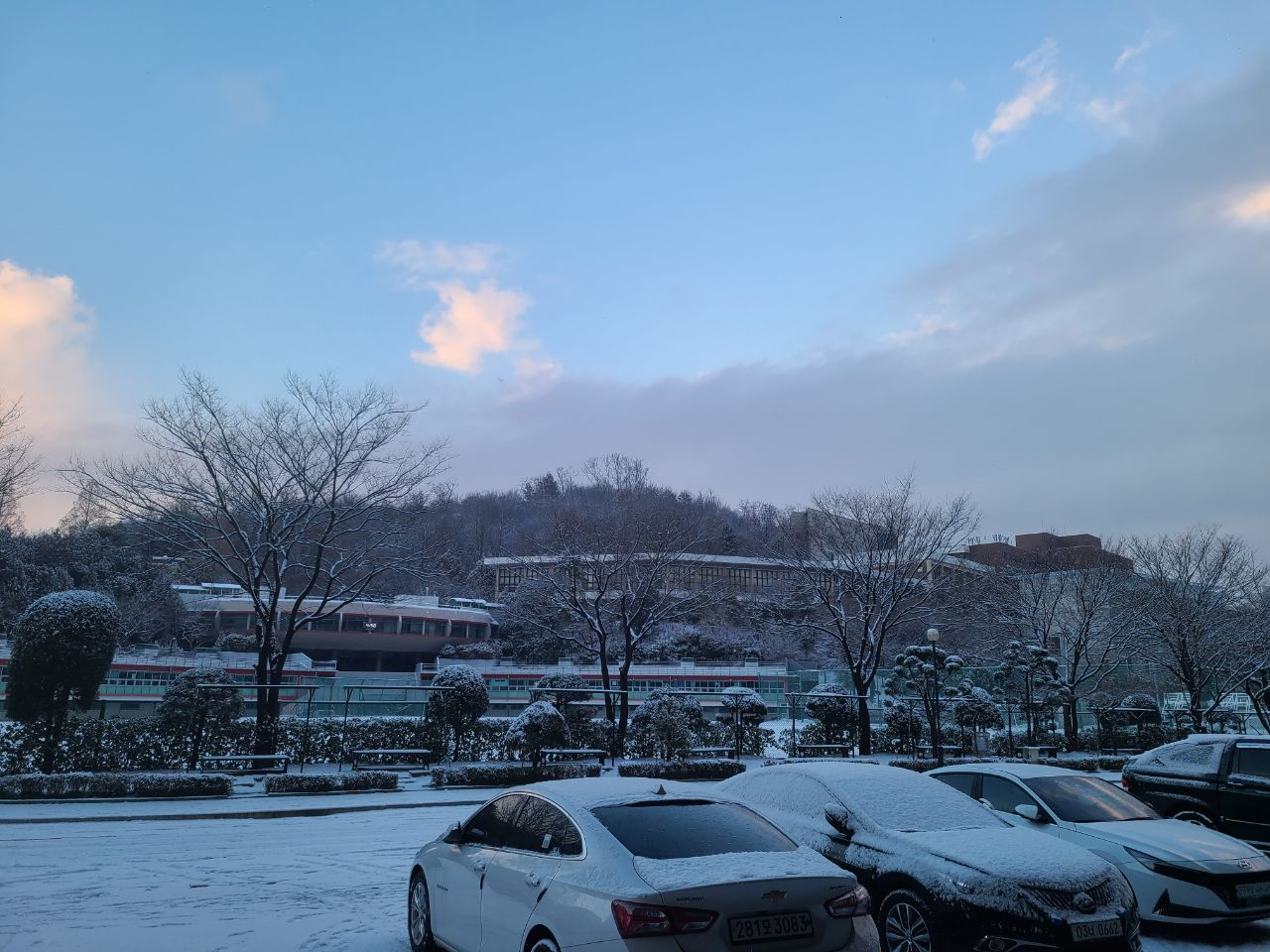
Emmaus Hall

Emmaus Hall, completed in November 1994, is one of the multiple student centers within the vicinity of Sogang University campus. Its name, Emmaus, refers to a significant place in the Levant for meeting Jesus, where according to the New Testament, is where Jesus first appeared after the resurrection. Similar to its name, Emmaus was established with the hope that it will solidify itself as a place where Sogang residents, which includes students, staff, and professors, can meet and spend time with each other. The hall consists of 3 ground floors with an area of 3,436 square meters wide. It also serves as a main building for 65 student clubs. There's also a grandstand, located on the second floor of the building, which can hold up to 1,500 people simultaneously. Student cafeteria is located on the third floor of the building. Roof of Emmaus Hall is mainly used as a rest area.

Youth Plaza is a large wide lawn plaza, which was created by the demolishment of an old basketball court. It was constructed and unveiled to the public in the year 1990, along with the opening of Albatross Tower. In 1998, it was named Herzog Square, to commemorate the visit of then German President, Roman Herzog. Below the Youth Plaza locates a parking management room, as well as a parking facility, which can hold up to 299 cars. The building below Youth Plaza has total of 4 floors, which altogether make up a structure with a total area of 10,777 square meters. Construction of the plaza began on October 10, 1996, and was finished on November 19, 1997.

== Organization ==
=== Colleges and academic programs ===
==== Undergraduate programs ====
- College of Humanities: Korean Language and Literature, Division of English, History, European Languages and Cultures, German Culture, French Culture, Chinese Culture, Japanese Culture, Philosophy, Religious Studies
- College of Social Sciences: Sociology, Psychology, Political Science
- College of Integrated Knowledge: Global Korean Studies, Art & Technology
- College of Media, Arts, and Science: Journalism and Strategic Communication, Media & Entertainment, Art & Technology, Global Korean Studies
- College of Communication: Communications
- College of Natural Sciences: Mathematics, Chemistry, Physics, Life Sciences
- College of Engineering: Electronic Engineering, Chemical and Biomolecular Engineering, Computer Science and Engineering, Mechanical Engineering, Artificial Intelligence, System Semiconductor Engineering
- College of Economics: Economics
- Sogang Business School: Business Administration
- Loyola International College: Division of Global Korean Studies, Geppert School of International Studies, Division of Global Interdisciplinary Studies

==== Graduate programs ====
- Graduate School
- Professional Graduate Schools: Graduate School of Theology, Graduate School of International Studies, Graduate School of Metaverse, Sogang Business School, Sogang Law School, Graduate School of MOT(Management of Technology)
- Special Graduate Schools: Graduate School of Public Policy, Graduate School of Education, Graduate School of Economics, Graduate School of Media & Communication, Graduate School of Information & Technology

=== Sogang Business School ===
In October 2009, Sogang University received accreditation in business from the Association to Advance Collegiate Schools of Business (AACSB) to establish the university's very first business school. Sogang Business School ranks among the nation's top five business schools. Located near Seoul's Financial District, alumni from the school have received the highest job-landing ratio for undergraduates among universities in South Korea in 2006, 2007 and 2008: the percentages of employment in major companies measured by the Ministry of Education were 55.1%, 53.3% and 54.9% respectively for these years.

=== Sogang School of Economics ===
The university has contributed significantly to the rapid economic growth of South Korea since the 1960s. Faculty members linked with Sogang have been deeply involved in shaping the country's future economic development model spearheaded through the top-level cabinet positions in the government by laying the groundwork of South Korea's rapid economic growth of South Korea. Due to these important engagements, a group of economists associated with the university and engaged in economic policy-making came to be called the "Sogang School." Based on its reputation, the institution has consistently drawn and attracted young talent of the highest intellectual caliber from around the country, mostly among applicants who scored in the top 1 percent threshold of the national college entrance examination. Sogang's economics department has been recognized as one of the foremost in South Korea based on international scholarly journal publications.

== Academics ==
=== Admissions ===
Admission to Sogang University is highly selective and nationally competitive. Sogang's freshman intake belongs to the top 1% of their high school academic performance in the country, as the university is widely regarded as one of the top private universities in addition to being one of the most prestigious elite schools in the country. However, the university's global ranking lags behind its esteemed national reputation and evaluation results because the institution has no medical school and fewer students enrolled compared to some other major Korean universities of a similar national rank.

=== Rankings ===
University rankings
JoongAng National	Domestic	8
QS National	General	17
THE National	General	22–27
USNWR National	General	34
QS Asia (Asia version)	General	=92
THE Asia (Asia version)	General	=180
USNWR Asia	General	=513
QS World	General	=558
THE World	General	801–1000
USNWR World	General	=1548

Sogang University was ranked 8th nationwide by the JoongAng Ilbo 2025 University Rankings, and 17th by QS World University Rankings. It was ranked 558th in the world in the 2026 QS World University Rankings. It was placed in the 801–1000 band in the 2025 Times Higher Education (THE) World University Rankings. In the 2025-26 U.S. News Best Global Universities, it ranked 582 in Asia.

The Sogang University Business School received AACSB accreditation in 2009. Its law school has been ranked among the top 100 globally by U.S. News and in the top 150–200 range by QS and THE. Domestically, it has ranked 6th among Korean law schools.

=== Sogang Institute for Whole Person Education ===
Sogang Institute for Whole Person Education is in charge of liberal arts education at Sogang University. It started as the General Education Department in 1977. It was reorganized into the Department of Liberal Arts in 1988, the College of Liberal Arts in 2004, Center for Basic Education in 2011, and Sogang Institute for Whole Person Education in 2015. It operated several centers under its jurisdiction, and helps with research and development of various programs for teaching and learning.

==== Sogang Center for Writing ====
Sogang Center for Writing was established to help improve and enhance writing skills of Sogang University Students. It offers various writing training programs, and integrates them into liberal arts courses, while also developing further creative writing programs. Sogang University has integrated the book review system into its Korean language courses a long time ago, which encouraged students to read many literary works while also expressing their opinions in writing. Sogang Center for Writing takes the system a step further to systematically educate and improve Sogang University's students writing skills.

=== Sogang Institute for Convergence Education ===
Sogang Institute for Convergence Education was established to provide creative, interdisciplinary, convergence education to the students of the university.

=== Sogang Korean Language Education Center ===
Sogang Korean Language Education Center (Sogang KLEC) was established in 1990 with the goal of popularizing and spreading the Korean language and Korean culture throughout the world. It provides regular, online, evening, summer special, and customized courses. Individuals from 70 to 80 countries are using Korean as an official language in order to exchange ideas at the program. Due to the various background and ethnic make up of the students at Sogang KLEC, the program developed the Sogang Korean Language Teaching Method, which was created in the process of finding the best way for foreigners with no knowledge of Korean to communicate in the most natural way possible. Sogang Korean textbook helped the education center stand out among other Korean language programs. The book itself features dynamic classes from the KLEC's classroom.

Since its establishment, over 30,000 students from overseas have learned about Korean culture and language by participating in its programs. Currently, an average of 3,500 students register for the Korean Language Education Center every year.

== Student life ==
=== Traditions ===
==== Sunrise Festival ====
The Sunrise Festival is an event where students celebrate the beginning of a new school life, similar to how sun rises. Students usually take exams, and have drinks with partners or friends who they have worked hard with. One of the activities that students also partake in is throwing each other into the fountain of Albatross Tower.

==== May Daedongje ====
May Daedongje, as it says in its name, takes place in May, when the weather gets warmer. As summer holidays come closer, Sogang university launches the festival in order to help students rest and prepare for the upcoming summer. Singers and idol groups can be seen performing at the Youth Plaza, while open daily pubs open throughout the campus around the same time as well.

==== NEW SOFEX ====
NEW SOFEX (Sogang-Sophia Festival of Exchange), also known as just SOFEX before 2018, is the first regular international university sports competition in Korea, where Sogang University faces off against Sophia University in Japan, from where Jesuit Fr. Theodore Geppert, S.J. came during the founding days of the university. During the competition, students of both institutions create connections, make friendships, and share culture.

==== Chuseok Homecoming Group ====
The Chuseok Homecoming Group is an event that arranges express buses to major cities across the country to help university students reach their homes at a cheaper price in comparison to regular busses. Chuseok is one of the biggest holidays in Korea. It is an annual autumn holiday, where people spend time at home, close to their family members and loved ones, and that also includes students. Using the Chuseok Homecoming Group, students whose family's primary place of residence is located outside of Seoul Capital Area, or in areas far away from Sinchon, are able to reduce travel costs significantly.

=== Clubs ===
General Student Association, also known as Sogang Dongyeon, is responsible for forstering university culture as well as providing its students with various activities. It collects and carries out the opinions and demands of all club members, ensuring that students are left satisfied with the work of the council, while also helping all members of the association grow and develop themselves. Goal of the student council is to contribute to the cultural and welfare activities of Sogang University students, making the institution a better place, and offering students a rich university experience.

Student clubs are classified into six different categories: the volunteer division, social education, performing arts, religious division, sports, and academic. Each student club within the classified division is equally unique, with many representing a specific part of the category.

Classification	List of Student Clubs
Volunteer	서강C.H.A.N.C.E., 손짓사랑, HUG
Social Education	서광회, 강미반, AIESEC, 서강영화공동체, 서강만화창작부, 블랙박스, 21C HERMIT, 인액터스 서강, 멋쟁이사자처럼 서강대 [준], 서글서글, 서강 SK LOOKIE
Performing Arts	서강연극회, 서강합창단, 킨젝스, 현우회, 에밀레, 노래문화연구회 맥박, ACES, 광야, S.H.O.C.K, ABYSS, Masu-Z, Messy-G, 건드림, M.I.T.Y, 온빛
Religious	IVF, 혜명, CCC, 예수전도단, 네비게이토 선교회, 이냐시오회, 서강대UDC
Sports	ISOLATION, 서강산악부, 서강검우회, SGTC, 서강야구반 알바트로스, YPOS, 서강농구반, 서강축구반, 서강태권도부, 서강탁구반, SMASH, 서강기우회, WALCS, 농우회, FC VENTURA, 굿민턴, F.C. EINS, TAP, 스트로크, 서강나비, SGAEM, 스프린트, SpikeG, AROSS, 서강 알바트로스, 서강펜싱부
Academic	RECS, SGCC, P.O.E., 별반, LENS, WAVB, SRS, SG Fenero, 서방정토, 서강AD, SUMM&IT, Sogang Lawve, MFA

== University symbol and slogan ==
The cardinal red university color symbolizes love, the Holy Spirit, martyrdom, loyalty, and victory. The silver chevron comes from the first letter 'ㅅ' of 서강 (Sogang), representing the intellectual spirit of Sogang and an ivory tower. The "IHS" comes from the first letters of the Greek name Ιησους (ΙΗΣΟΥΣ) for Jesus and is also found on the seal of the Society of Jesus, the Catholic religious order that founded the university. The medieval crown stands for the Virgin and Trinity, symbolizing wisdom. Sogang University also has a famous slogan which is: Be as Proud of Sogang as Sogang is Proud of You (Korean: 그대 서강의 자랑이듯, 서강 그대의 자랑이어라).

== Notable alumni and faculty ==
=== Alumni ===
==== Politics ====
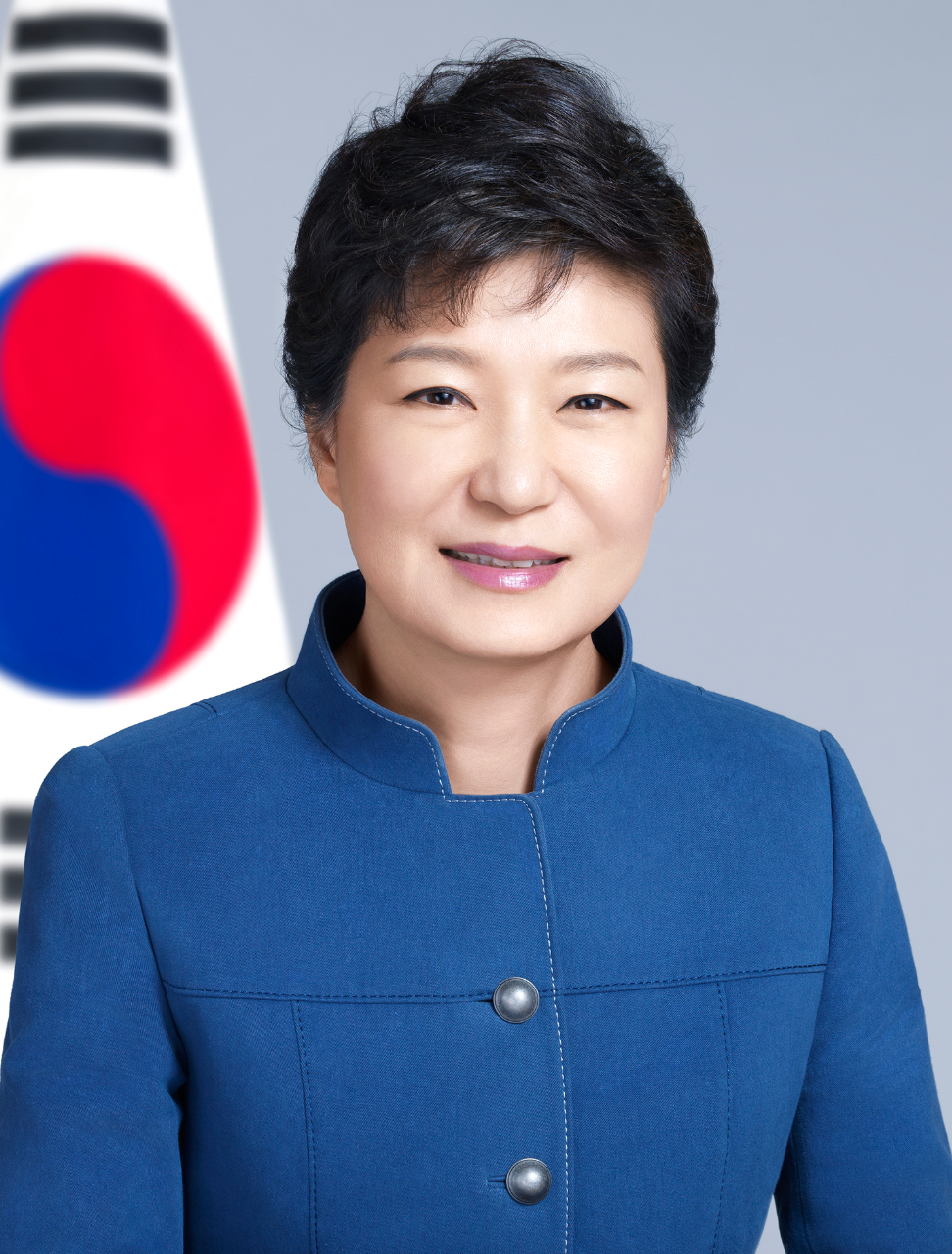
Park Geun-hye, 11th president of the Republic of Korea

- Park Geun-hye, 11th president of the Republic of Korea
- Park Young-sun, minister of SMEs and startups (2019–present); former member of the National Assembly (2008–2020)
- Suh Byung-soo, member of the National Assembly; former mayor of Busan (2014–2018)
- Kim Young-joo, member of the National Assembly; former minister of employment and labor (2017–2018)
- Lee Hae-sik, member of the National Assembly
- Yang Yiwonyoung, member of the National Assembly
- Cheong Yang-seog, former member of the National Assembly (2016–2020)
- Kim Tae-young, former minister of national defense (2009–2010)
- Jeon Yeo-ok, former member of the National Assembly (2012)
- Choi Soon-hong, former United Nations chief information technology officer

==== Business ====
- Kwon Hyuk-bin, founder & CEO, Smilegate Holdings
- Kim Suk-won, former chairman of SsangYong Group

==== Academia ====
- Lee Bae-yong, former president of Ewha Womans University (2006–2010)
- Yoon Min-joong, chemist
- Kim Gyung-hwan, former professor of economics, former first vice minister of Land, Infrastructure and Transport
- Cho Jang-ok, former professor of economics, member of The National Academy of Sciences of Korea

==== Literature ====
- Ahn Jung-hyo, novelist, translator
- Baik Sou-linne, author
- Choi Si-han, writer
- Hwang Ji-u, poet, art critic
- Kim Kyung-ju, poet
- Kim Seung-hee, poet, essayist, novelist
- Kim Won-u, novelist
- Lim Chul-woo, writer
- Wonje, monk and essayist

==== Broadcasting and entertainment ====
- Choi Jong-Hwan
- Go Joo-won
- Jo Hee-bong
- Jung Han-yong
- Kim Dong-won
- Lee Kwang-hoon
- Moon Sung-keun
- Nam Ji-hyun
- Park Chan-wook
- Park Eun-bin
- Sam Okyere
- Seorak Park
- Shin Hae-chul (N.EX.T)
- Yang Hee-eun
- Yang Mi-kyung
- Yoo Byung-jae
- Yoon Ga-eun

=== Notable faculty ===
- Choe Yun, professor of French literature
- Almas Heshmati, professor of economics
- Yoon Kyung-byung, professor of chemistry
- Brother Anthony, emeritus of English literature
- Yoon Nung-min, former professor of chemistry
- Lee Ki-baek, former professor of history
- Nam Duck-woo, former professor of economics, former prime minister of South Korea
- Chang Young-hee, professor of English literature, columnist, motivational writer
- Kim Chong-in, former professor of economics; former member of the National Assembly
- Sohn Hak-kyu, former professor of political science; former governor of Gyeonggi Province, former minister of health and welfare; former member of National Assembly
- Cho Yoon-je, former professor of international studies; former South Korean ambassador to the United States

== See also ==
- List of Jesuit sites
