= Ewha Womans University station =

Subway station in Seoul, South Korea

Coordinates: 37°33′24″N 126°56′45″E

이대; Ewha Womans Univ.
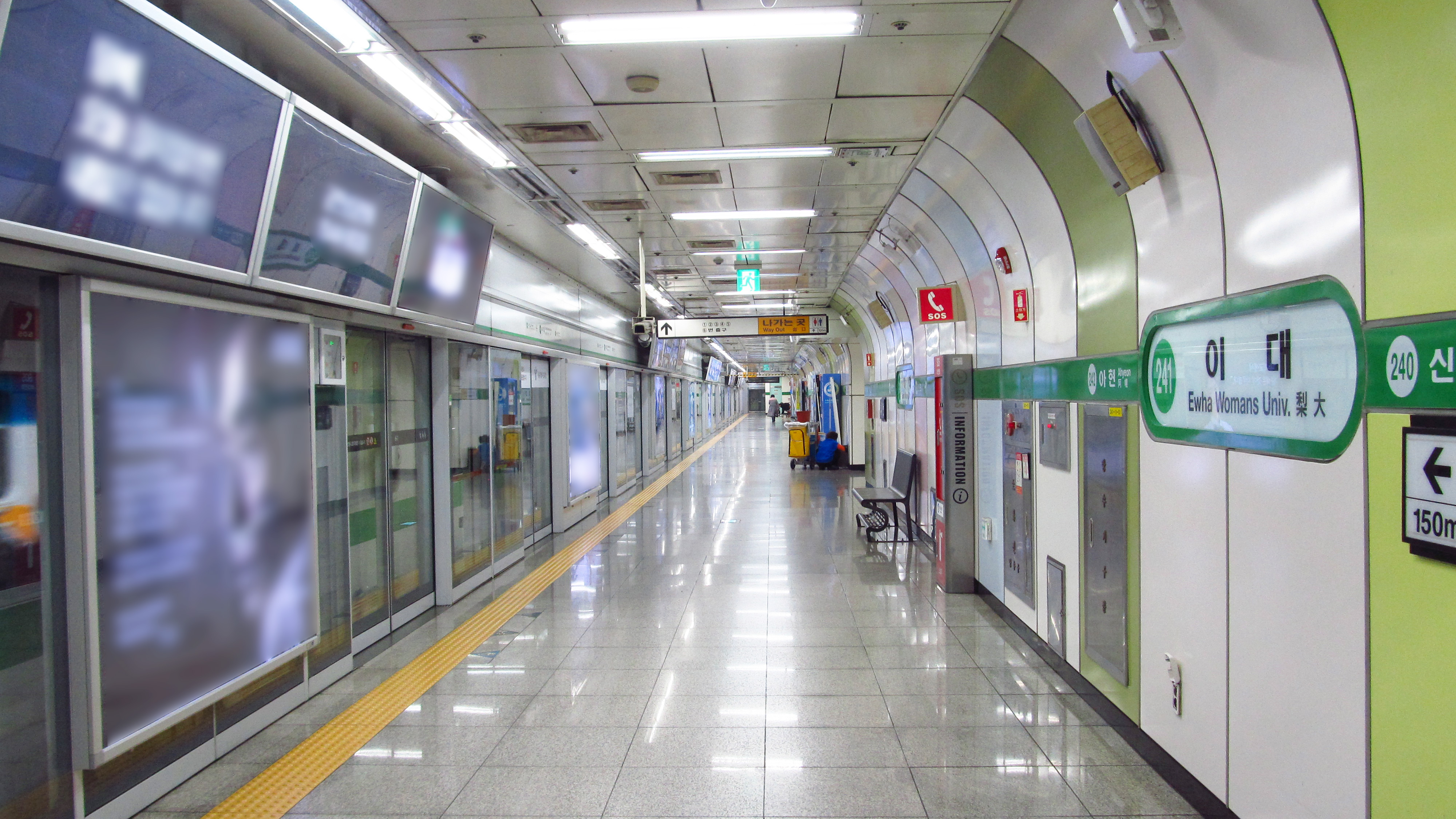
- Station Platform

Korean name
- Hangul: 이대역
- Hanja: 梨大驛
- Revised Romanization: Idae-yeok
- McCune–Reischauer: Idae-yŏk

General information
- Location: 2 Daeheung-dong, Mapo-gu, Seoul
- Operator: Seoul Metro
- Line: Line 2
- Platforms: 1
- Tracks: 2

Construction
- Structure type: Underground

History
- Opened: May 22, 1984

Passengers
- (Daily) Based on Jan-Dec of 2012. Line 2: 48,753

Services
Preceding station	Seoul Metropolitan Subway	Following station
Sinchon Next counterclockwise	Line 2	Ahyeon Next clockwise
Location

Ewha Womans University (Korean: 이대역; RR: Idae-yeok) is a station on the Line 2 of the Seoul Metropolitan Subway. As its name indicates, it serves the nearby Ewha Womans University, although Sinchon Station on the Gyeongui-Jungang Line is closer to the school.

== Surroundings ==
As many schools and residential buildings are close to Ewha Womans University Station, there are many shops selling clothes at relatively low price. The main street selling clothes is named Ewhayeodae 5-gil.

== Station layout ==
Although technically the station has one island platform with both rail tracks running on opposite sides, the two boarding areas with screen doors are essentially blocked off from each other, and are connected only by a few long and narrow passageways. Some people mistake this station to have two side platforms that are adjacent to each other.

G	Street level	Exit

L1; Concourse	Lobby	Customer Service, Shops, Vending machines, ATMs

L2; Platform level	Outer circle	← Line 2 Next counterclockwise (Sinchon)
L2; Platform level	Island platform, doors will open on the left
L2; Platform level	Island platform, doors will open on the left
L2; Platform level	Inner circle	Line 2 Next clockwise (Ahyeon) →
