= Ahyeon station =

Station of the Seoul Metropolitan Subway

아현; Ahyeon
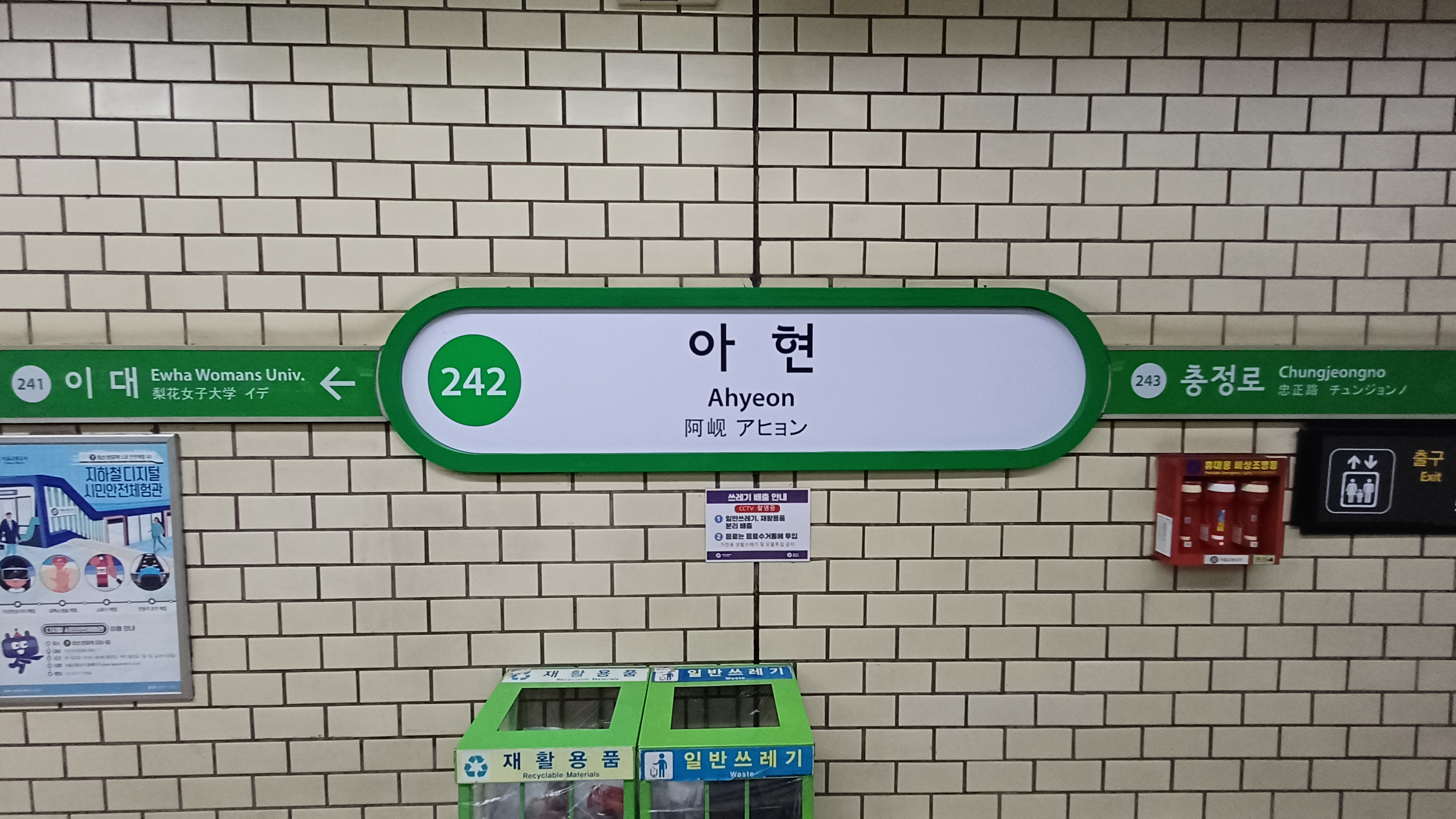

Korean name
- Hangul: 아현역
- Hanja: 阿峴驛
- RR: Ahyeon-yeok
- MR: Ahyŏn-yŏk

General information
- Location: 329 Ahyeon-dong, 60 Sinchon-ro, Mapo-gu, Seoul
- Coordinates: 37°33′26.68″N 126°57′22.17″E
- Operator: Seoul Metro
- Line: Line 2
- Platforms: 2
- Tracks: 2

Construction
- Structure type: Underground

History
- Opened: May 22, 1984

Passengers
- (Daily) Based on Jan-Dec of 2012. Line 2: 16,585

Services
Preceding station	Seoul Metropolitan Subway	Following station
Ewha Womans University Next counterclockwise	Line 2	Chungjeongno Next clockwise
Location

Ahyeon station (Korean: 아현역; Hanja: 阿峴驛) is a subway station on Line 2 of the Seoul Metropolitan Subway. The station's name means "small hill between two larger hills".

== Station layout ==
G	Street level	Exit

L1; Concourse	Lobby	Customer Service, Shops, Vending machines, ATMs

L2; Platform level	Side platform, doors will open on the right
L2; Platform level	Outer circle	← Line 2 Next counterclockwise (Ewha Womans University)
L2; Platform level	Wall
L2; Platform level	Inner circle	Line 2 Next clockwise (Chungjeongno) →
L2; Platform level	Side platform, doors will open on the right
