= Chungjeongno station =

Train station in Seoul, South Korea

Coordinates: 37°33′36″N 126°57′49″E

충정로 (경기대입구); Chungjeongno (Kyonggi Univ.)
충정로 (경기대입구); Chungjeongno (Kyonggi Univ.)
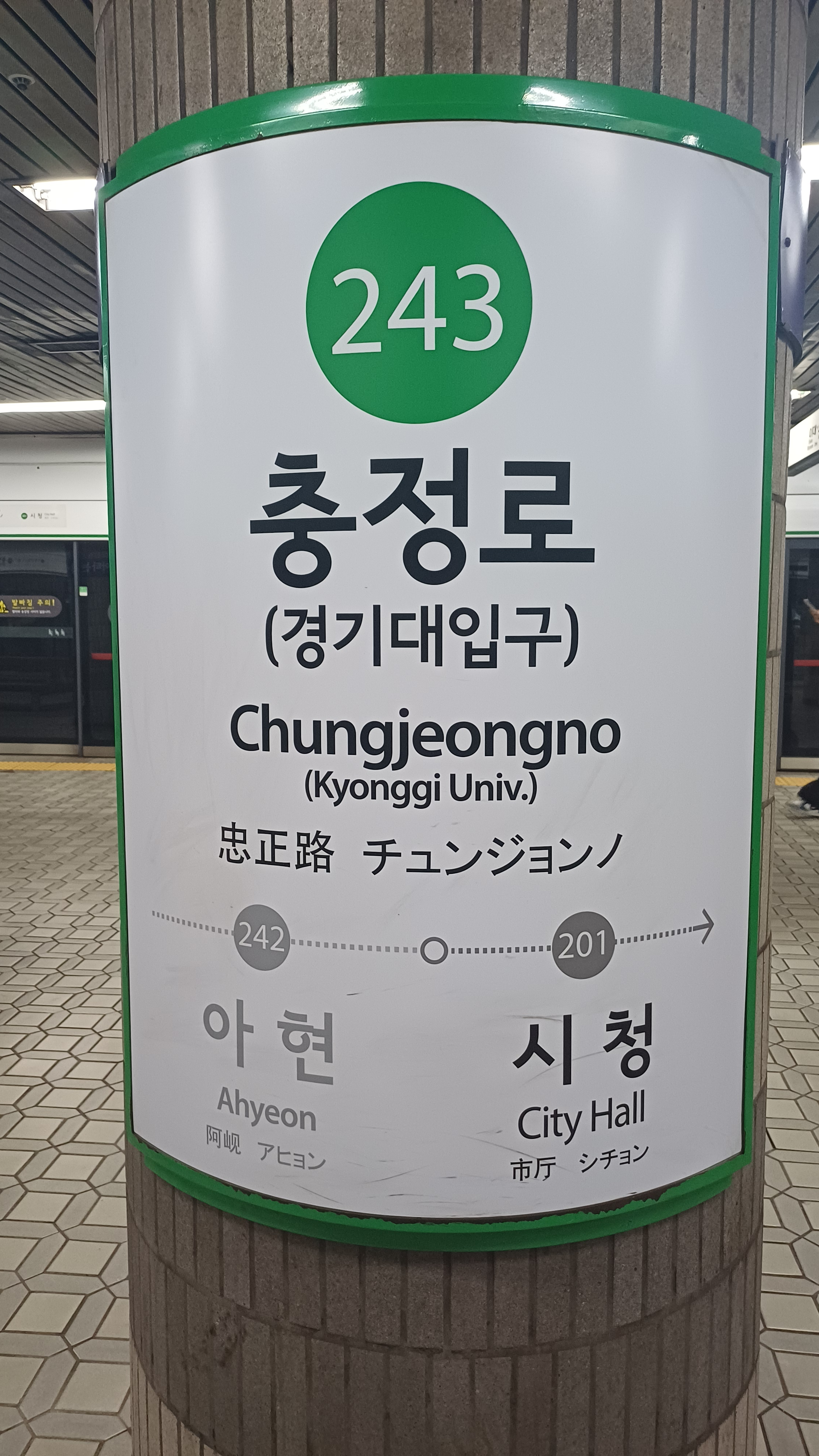
- Station Sign (Line 2)

Korean name
- Hangul: 충정로역
- Hanja: 忠正路驛
- Revised Romanization: Chungjeongno-yeok
- McCune–Reischauer: Ch'ungjŏngno-yŏk

General information
- Location: 17 Seosomun-ro, 295-60 Chungjeongno 3-ga, Seodaemun-gu, Seoul
- Operator: Seoul Metro
- Lines: Line 2 Line 5
- Platforms: 2
- Tracks: 4

Construction
- Structure type: Underground

Key dates
- May 22, 1984: Line 2 opened
- December 30, 1996: Line 5 opened

Passengers
- (Daily) Based on Jan-Dec of 2012. Line 2: 25,652; Line 5: 9,007
Services
Preceding station	Seoul Metropolitan Subway	Following station
Ahyeon Next counterclockwise	Line 2	City Hall Next clockwise
Aeogae towards Banghwa	Line 5	Seodaemun towards Hanam Geomdansan or Macheon
Location

Chungjeongno Station (Korean: 충정로역) is a subway station on Seoul Subway Line 2 and Seoul Subway Line 5. It is located in Seodaemun District, Seoul, South Korea. Chungjeong was the pen name of minister Min Yeong-hwan, who committed suicide protesting the signing of the Japan–Korea Treaty of 1905.

== Gallery ==
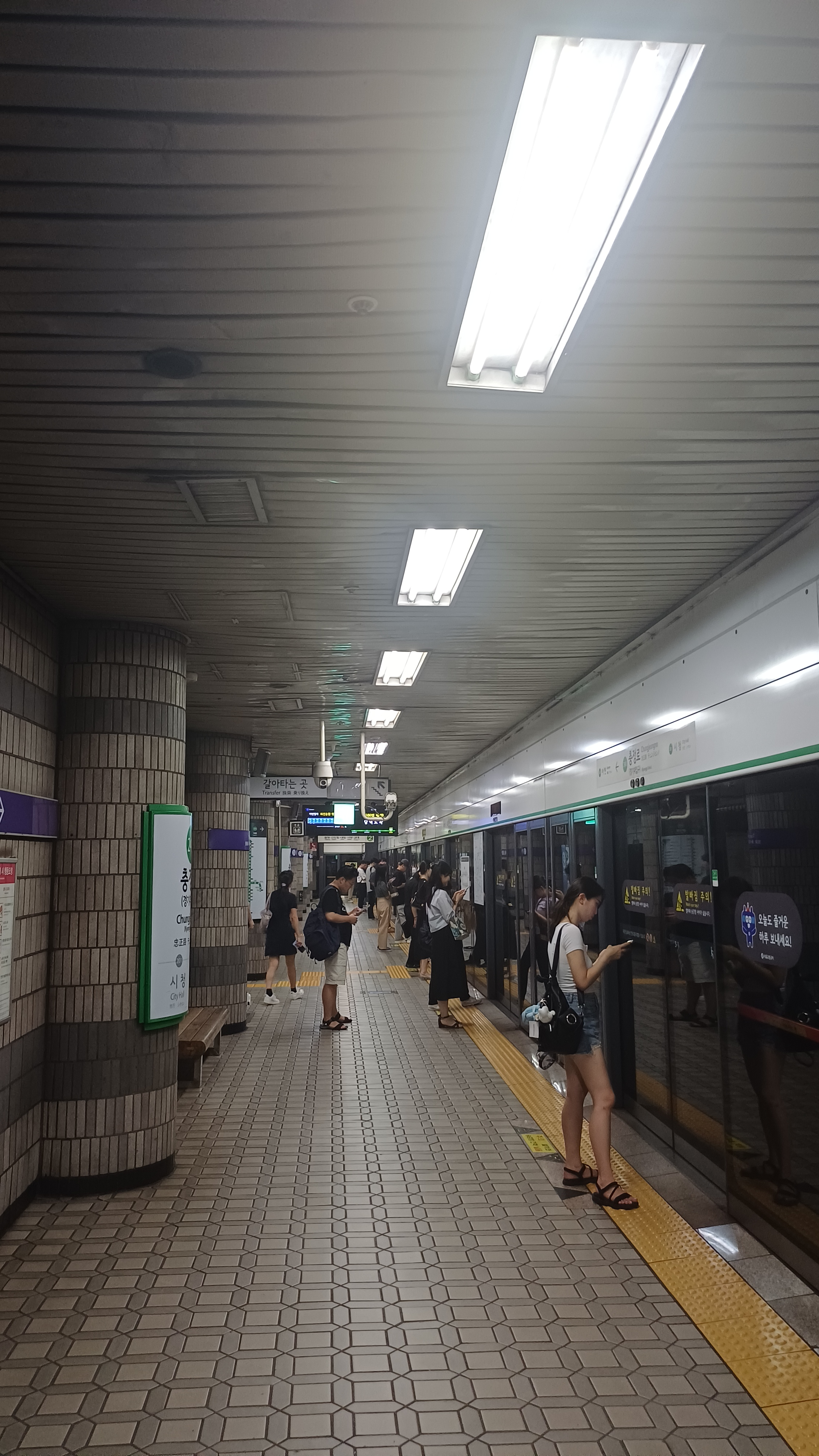
Line 2 Platform

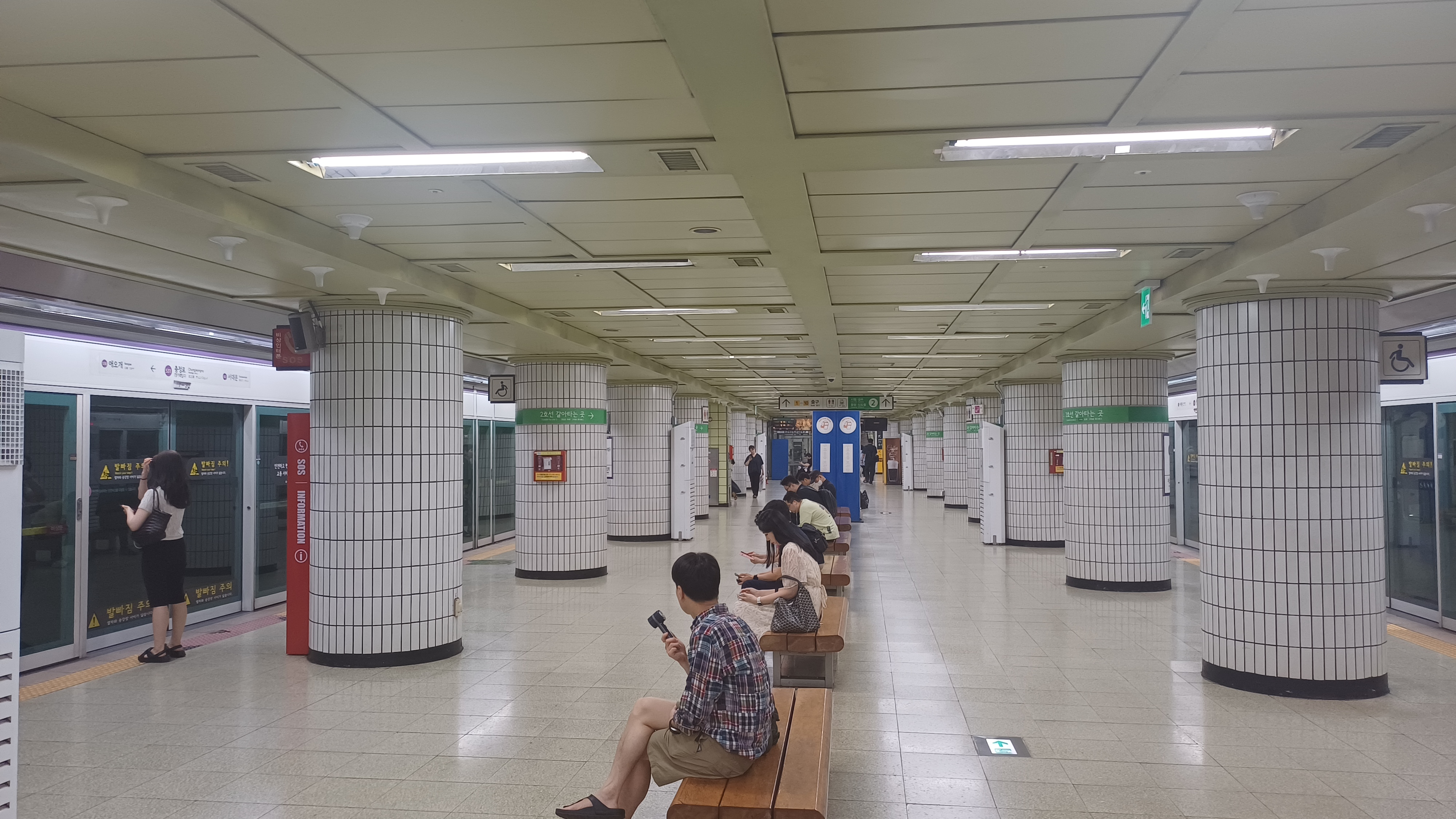
Line 5 Platform

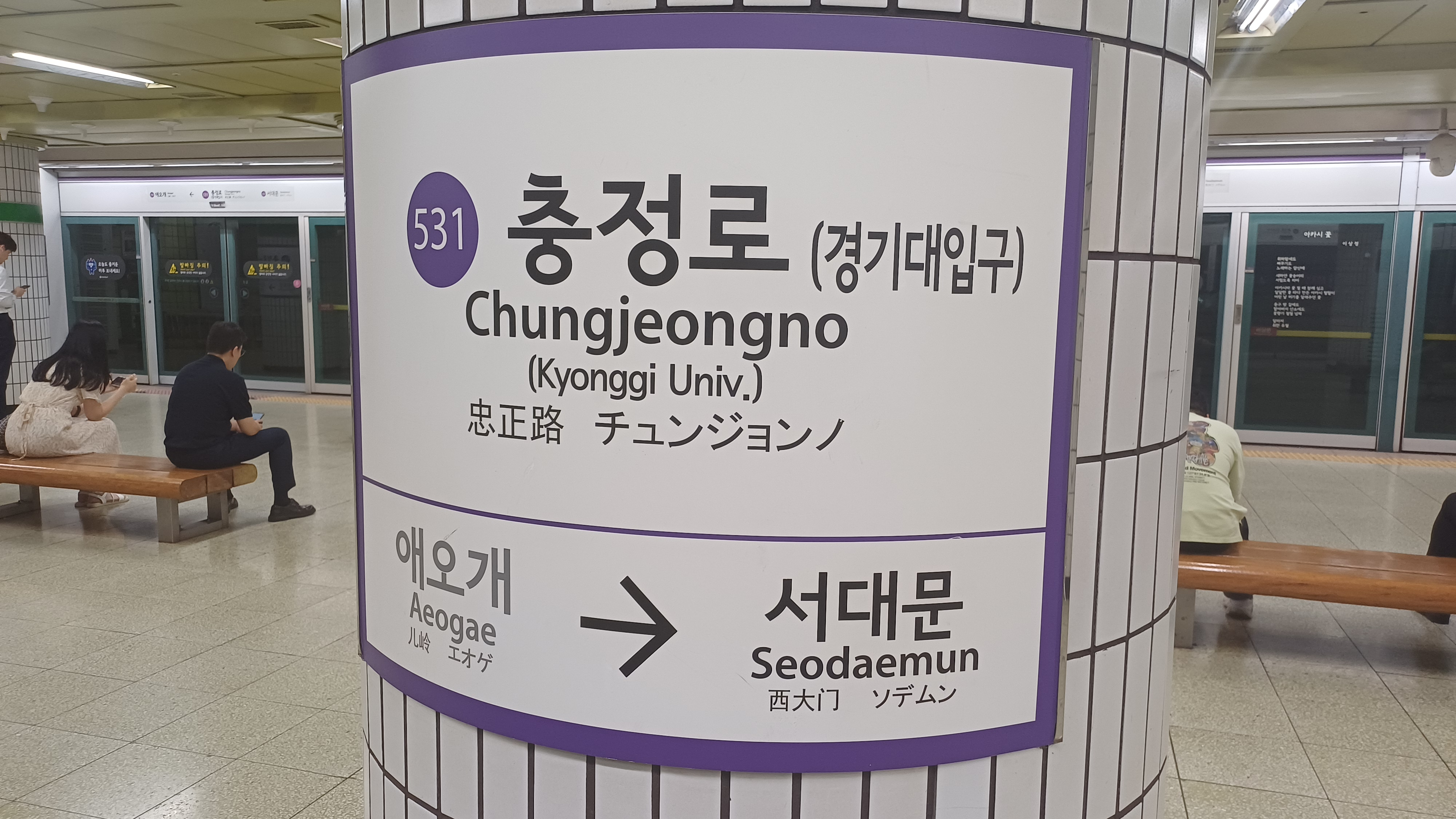
Line 5 station sign
