= Wonje (monk) =

Wonje 원제
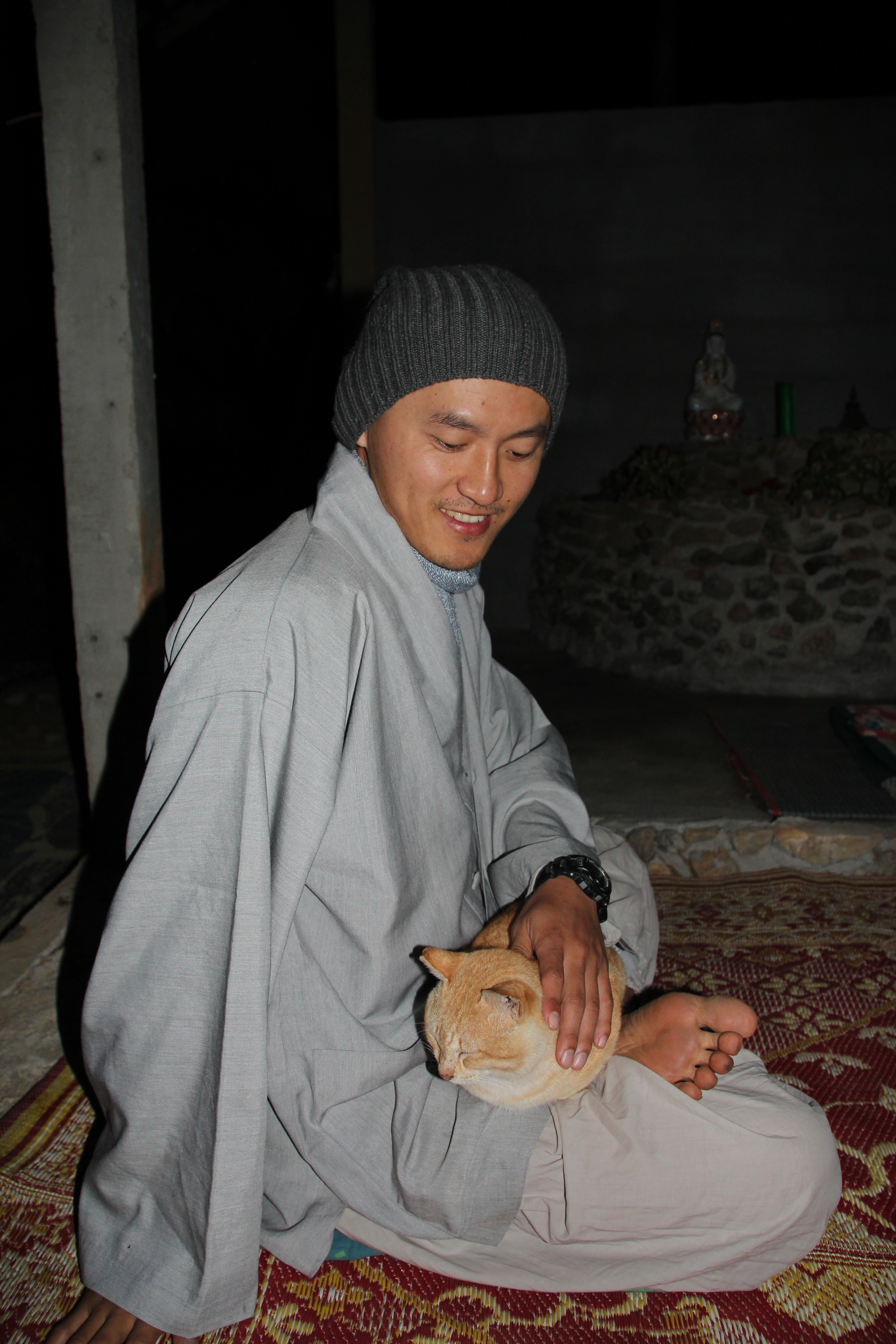
- Mindfull Farm, Chiang Mai

Personal life
- Born: South Korea
- Education: Sogang University religious studies
- Other name: Wonje Sunim
- Website: blog.naver.com/monkwonje

Religious life
- Religion: Jogye Order of Korean Seon

Senior posting
- Predecessor: Beopjeon

Wonje (원제) is a Korean monk, essayist, and travel writer.

== Life ==
After graduating from the Department of Religious Studies at Sogang University in 2006, he was ordained as the 40th disciple of the Buddhist monk Beopjeon. In addition to being impressed with the Buddha's 'authenticity' by looking at the early scriptures of the Gautama Buddha, his meditation experience led him to become a monk. He has traveled to 45 countries on 5 continents for 2 years from September 2012, and published 《If the question stops, it becomes the answer by itself》 in 2019. He is currently practicing in Gimcheon Monastery and publishing articles through SNS.

== Book ==
- 《If the question stops, it becomes the answer by itself》
