= Choi Soon-hong =

South Korean politician (born 1950)

- Hangul: 최순홍
- Hanja: 崔淳弘
- RR: Choe Sunhong
- MR: Ch'oe Sunhong

Choi Soon-hong (Korean: 최순홍; born 1950) is a South Korean politician. He was born in Seoul, South Korea. He formerly served as United Nations Chief Information Technology Officer at the level of Assistant Secretary-General. He was appointed to the position by UN Secretary-General Ban Ki-moon in July 2007 and left the organization in August 2012.

Choi has experience in both the public sector and the private sector. Starting his career as Quality Assurance Manager at Systems Automation Corporation in 1977, he also worked as Information Systems Analyst at TRW, Inc. between 1980 and 1981.

In 1981, he joined the International Monetary Fund (IMF), where he served in numerous technical and business operations and team leadership positions until 1997. He was Division Chief of Technology Infrastructure in between 1997 and 1999 and Senior Budget Manager and Strategy Adviser from 1999 to 2004. Later on, he served as Head of Information Technology Services at IMF from 2004 to February 2007. He has been the IMF representative to the Information and Communications Technology Network of the United Nations Chief Executives Board for Coordination, and a member of the United Nations International Computing Centre's Management Committee since 2005.

In his position as UN Chief Information Technology Officer, he was in charge of all substantive and operational needs relating to information and communications technology of the United Nations, including developing, maintaining and monitoring the implementation of the effective information and communication strategy.

Choi has conducted research and lectured on public policy, strategic management and innovation. His recent research interests are globalization, technology competition, digital society, knowledge sharing and information and communications technology for development.

Choi holds a bachelor's degree in engineering from Sogang University, a master's degree in computer science from George Washington University, an MBA from the Wharton School of the University of Pennsylvania, and a Ph.D. in strategic management and public policy from George Washington University.
