= Lee Bae-yong =

13th president of Ewha Womans University

Lee Bae-Yong (born January 1, 1947) was the 13th president of Ewha Womans University, in central Seoul, South Korea. In 1969, Lee graduated from Ewha Womans University Department of History, and in 1971, received her master's degree in history from the university. Lee majored in Korean history at Sogang University where she earned a doctorate in 1984. Since 1985, Lee has worked as a professor.

== Major career ==
- 2010 - President of Presidential Council on Nation Branding
- 2009 - The 3rd Director of Gyeonggi-do Family & Women's Research Institute
- 2008 - Consultant of the 17th Presidential Advisory Board
- 2006 - The 13th president of Ewha Womans University
- 2006 - President of Choseon Dynasty Historical Society
- 2005 - Deliberating council member of Seoul Cultural Assets Committee
- 2004 - President of Korean Association of Women's History
- 2003 - National Institute of Korean History committee member
- 1999 - Seoul History Compilation committee member
