= Lee Ki-ho (writer) =

South Korean writer (born 1972)

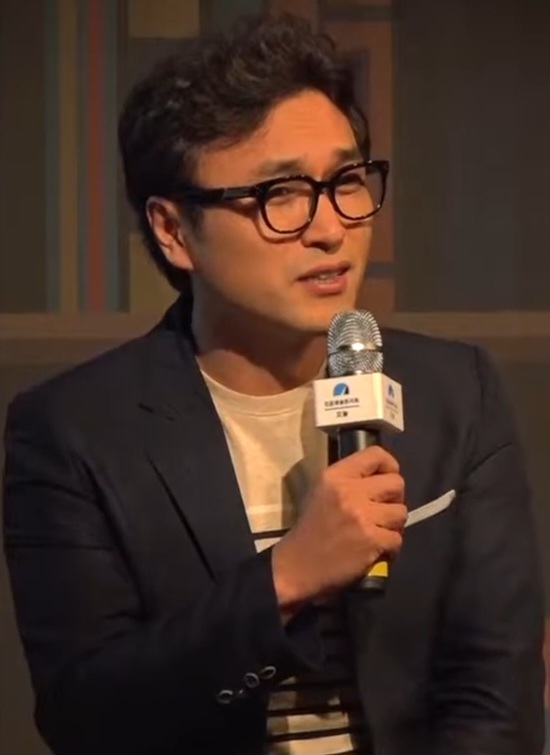
- Born: 1972 (age 53–54)
- Writing career
- Language: Korean

Korean name
- Hangul: 이기호
- Hanja: 李起昊
- RR: I Giho
- MR: I Kiho

Lee Ki-ho (Korean: 이기호; born 1972) is a South Korean writer.

== Life ==
Lee Ki-ho was born in Wonju, Gangwon Province, South Korea, in 1972. Lee Ki-ho debuted when his short story “Birney” won the monthly Modern Literature New Writer's Contest in 1999. He is currently a professor in the department of creative writing at Gwangju University.

== Work ==
Lee Ki-ho is considered to be one of South Korea's most unusual writers to the extent that one critic has declared that the conventions of a story cannot be applied to Lee's work. Lee debuted in 1999 with “Bunny,” a short story that seems to reflect the rhythms of rap, as well as pansori, a traditional Korean ballad. The stories following his debut are just as diversely experimental, for one story borrows the question and answer method of an interrogation, while another adopts the writing style and typeset of the Bible, and still another uses language that is suggestive of the kind used on a TV cooking show.

Lee is also credited as being inventive with his characters, many of them having been described as humble and sordid. Some examples include a pimp who dropped out of high school after assaulting a teacher, an actor addicted to glue, a gang member who had grown up in an orphanage, and a character who works at a local convenience store to make a living. Many of Lee's stories also feature characters with abnormal traits, such as a youth who has eyes in the back of his head and a man who falls in love with a flagstaff.

The characters are described as distinctive and realistic individuals who can be found on the fringes of society. A character named Lee Sibong, who appears regularly in Lee's work, is portrayed a little differently in each story but is, for the most part, a pathetic and naïve flunky with no luck, someone who seems to be the epitome of human failure. By ridiculing the lives of these vulgar yet common characters, Lee introduces humour to his work. However, the target of this humour quickly becomes society itself that is steeped in arrogance and artifice, for the characters’ vulgarity, naiveté, and tragic failures symbolize the failings of society.

Lee has had one novel translated into English, At Least We Can Apologize in 2013. At Least We Can Apologize has been described as:

post-modern, and a bit absurd, but also a fun read on at least two levels. First is the surface level, as a farcical course of events. Second is as a metaphor for the ability of power, particularly when it can instill guilt in the powerless, to control without having to use formal control, and how that, once unbalanced, can spill completely out of control.

In 2010 Lee won the Yi Hyo-seok Literature Prize.

== Works in English translation ==
- At Least We Can Apologize (사과는 잘해요; translator: Christopher J. Dykas), 2013, Dalkey Archive Press, ISBN 9781564789198
- So Far, and Yet So Near (밀수록 다시 가까워지는; translator: Theresa Kim), 2014, ASIA Publishers, ISBN 9791156620150
- Kwon Sun-chan and Nice People (권순찬과 착한 사람들; translator: Stella Kim), 2015, ASIA Publishers, ISBN 9791156621232

== Works in Korean (partial) ==
Novels

- At Least We Can Apologize

Short story collections

- Choi Sunduk: Filled with the Holy Spirit (2004)
- I Knew If I Stayed around Long Enough, Something like This Would Happen (2006)

== Awards ==
- Modern Literature New Writer's Contest (1999)
- Yi Hyo-seok Literature Prize (2010)
