= Journal of Economic Surveys =

Academic journal

- Discipline: Economics
- Language: English
- Edited by: Leslie T. Oxley, Iris Claus

Publication details
- History: 1987-Present
- Publisher: John Wiley & Sons
- Frequency: Bimonthly
- Impact factor: 2.299 (2018)

Standard abbreviations
- ISO 4: J. Econ. Surv.

Indexing
- ISSN: 0950-0804 (print); 1467-6419 (web)

Links
- Journal homepage; Online access; Online archive

Journal of Economic Surveys is a peer-reviewed academic journal published by John Wiley & Sons. The journal was established in 1987. The journal covers developments in economics in areas such as econometrics, economic history and business economics. Specific topics include business, finance, banking, regulation and exchanges.

According to the Journal Citation Reports, the journal has a 2020 impact factor of 4.237, ranking it 56 out of 378 journals in the category "Economics".

The Journal of Economic Surveys is also rated as an 'A' class journal in the Australian Business Deans Council Journal List.

In 2024, its editorial board resigned en masse over the publisher's decision to "emphasize quantity over quality", writing that doing so would increase the "risks of proliferation of poor-quality science".
