= Mapo-dong =

- Country: South Korea

Korean name
- Hangul: 마포동
- Hanja: 麻浦洞
- RR: Mapo-dong
- MR: Map'o-dong

Mapo-dong (Korean: 마포동) is a dong (neighbourhood) of Mapo District, Seoul, South Korea.

== See also ==
- Administrative divisions of South Korea
