= Tojeong-dong =

- Country: South Korea

Korean name
- Hangul: 토정동
- Hanja: 土亭洞
- RR: Tojeong-dong
- MR: T'ojŏng-dong

Tojeong-dong (Korean: 토정동) is a dong (neighbourhood) of Mapo District, Seoul, South Korea.

== See also ==
- Administrative divisions of South Korea
