= Nogosan-dong =

- Country: South Korea

Area
  - Total: 0.48 km^{2} (0.19 sq mi)

Population (2001)
  - Total: 9,771
  - Density: 20,000/km^{2} (53,000/sq mi)

Korean name
- Hangul: 노고산동
- Hanja: 老姑山洞
- RR: Nogosan-dong
- MR: Nogosan-dong

Nogosan-dong (Korean: 노고산동) is a dong (neighbourhood) of Mapo District, Seoul, South Korea.

== See also ==
- Administrative divisions of South Korea
