= Daeheung-dong, Seoul =

Daeheung-dong
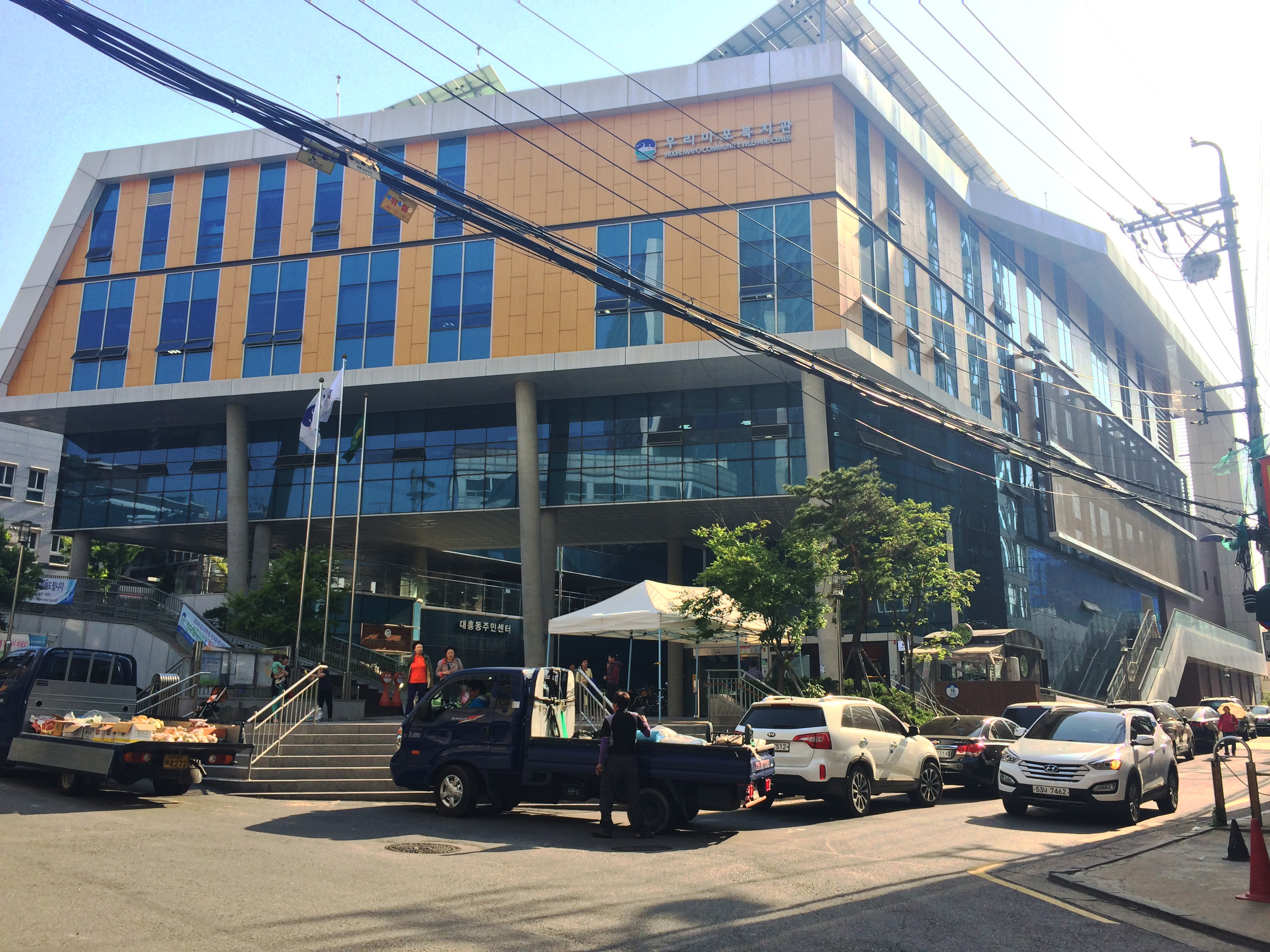
- Daeheung-dong Community Service Center
- Interactive map of Daeheung-dong
- Country: South Korea

Area
  - Total: 0.54 km^{2} (0.21 sq mi)

Population (2001)
  - Total: 16,451
  - Density: 30,000/km^{2} (79,000/sq mi)

Korean name
- Hangul: 대흥동
- Hanja: 大興洞
- RR: Daeheung-dong
- MR: Taehŭng-dong

Daeheung-dong (Korean: 대흥동) is a dong (neighborhood) of Mapo District, Seoul, South Korea.

== Overview ==
The name Daeheung-dong comes from renaming Dongmakhari as Daeheung-jeong when it was incorporated into Seoul during the 1936 expansion of the city's districts.

Daeheung-dong began to develop in March 1929, when the Yongsan Line was opened for round trips between Yongsan and Dangin-ri. Before that, it was a quiet village known for making earthenware. However, the opening of the railway, which transported various materials for the Dangin-ri thermal power plant, brought activity to the area, including the construction of Dongmak Station as an intermediate stop.

Near Dongmak Station was a well called Saewoomul ("New Well"), named because it was newly dug to provide water for cooling freight cars. The neighborhood around this well came to be called Saewoomul-gil ("New Well Street"). Another well, located in the middle of rice fields, was called variously Nonga-joong-e Whul ("Field Well"), Non-woomul, or Dapjungdong Well, and was used to supply water to the fields.

Meanwhile, the construction of Dongmak Station and the railway reportedly disrupted the village's original hyeol (geomantic energy lines), which had been called Hyeolmaegi. This site had been considered a good location for business and raising notable figures, but after the hyeol was broken, the village is said to have become impoverished.

== See also ==
- Administrative divisions of South Korea
