= Keyvitup =

South Korean boy band

- Also known as: KVP
- Origin: Seoul, South Korea
- Genre: K-pop
- Years active: 2026–present
- Label: iNKODE Entertainment
- Members: Taehwan; Hyunmin; Sena; Jaein; Rukia

Keyvitup (Korean: 키빗업; stylized in all caps) is a South Korean boy group under iNKODE Entertainment. The group consists of five members: Taehwan, Hyunmin, Sena, Jaein, and Rukia. They debuted on April 8, 2026, with the self-titled extended play (EP) Keyvitup. They are the first boy group produced by JYJ's Kim Jae-joong.

== Name ==
The name of the group combines the words "KEY", "VITAL", and "UP". It represents the key that opens doors to new worlds, the energy and liveliness of the members, and the infinite pathways of success for the group.

== History ==
=== Formation through INTHE X Project ===
Keyvitup was formed through iNKODE Entertainment's trainee project, InThe X Project, which aimed to form a new boy group. Sena and Hyunmin were revealed as members of the project on November 19, 2025, with Taehwan and Rukia following suit over the next few days. Jaein was revealed as a member later on December 23, 2025.

On February 25, 2026, the trainees of INTHE X Project were divided into two groups, each with their own unique concepts. Keyvitup was introduced with a performance-driven sound shaped by hip-hop influences.

Before becoming members of InThe X Project and Keyvitup, several members had already been active in the entertainment industry. In 2024, Taehwan took part in the JTBC reality competition show Project 7, but was eliminated in the eleventh episode after ranking 30th. Additionally, several other trainees received training under other entertainment companies. Sena received training from under ADOR, while Rukia received training from under YG Entertainment.

=== 2026-present: Debut with Keyvitup, and Na-Gari ===
On March 8, 2026, it was announced that Keyvitup would make their official debut on April 8, with their first self-titled EP Keyvitup, alongside its double lead singles "Keyvitup" and "Legendary", following the pre-release single "Best One" on March 27. The group held a showcase in Seoul to commemorate their debut and the EP's release.

Keyvitup made their international debut as part of the daily line-up for KCON Japan 2026, and the August 14-15 line-up for KCON LA 2026.

On October 20, it was announced that the group's second EP Na-Gari would be released on November 9 alongside its similarly titled lead single. The EP features 5 tracks, with member Rukia credited as a lyricist on "Love Me Don't Leave Me Alone". Meanwhile, all the members were credited as lyricists on the title track of the album and "Alright".

== Members ==
- Taehwan (태환)
- Hyunmin (현민)
- Sena (세나)
- Jaein (재인)
- Rukia (루키아)

== Discography ==
=== Extended plays ===
List of extended plays, showing selected details, selected chart positions, and sales figures
Title	Details	Peak chart positions	Sales
Title	Details	KOR	Sales
Keyvitup	Released: April 8, 2026; Label: iNKODE; Formats: CD, digital download, streaming; Track listing: 1. "Best One"; 2. "Keyvitup"; 3. "Legendary"; 4. "Show Me Something"; 5. "Polaroid"	5	KOR: 124,051
Na-Gari	Released: November 9, 2026; Label: iNKODE; Formats: CD, digital download, streaming; Track listing: 1. "Chemistry"; 2. "Nagari"; 3. "Ta"; 4. "Alright"; 5. "Love Me Don't Leave Me Alone"	9	KOR: 155,999

=== Singles ===
List of singles, showing year released, selected chart positions, and name of the album
Title	Year	Peak chart positions	Album
Title	Year	KOR DL	Album
"Best One"	2026	119	Keyvitup
"Keyvitup"	2026	101	Keyvitup
"Legendary"	2026	113	Keyvitup
"Nagari"	2026	106	Na-Gari

=== Other charted songs ===
List of other charted songs, showing year released, selected chart positions, and name of the album
Title	Year	Peak chart positions	Album
Title	Year	KOR DL	Album
"Show Me Something"	2026	120	Keyvitup
"Polaroid"	2026	118	Keyvitup
"Chemistry"	2026	128	Na-Gari
"Ta"	2026	130	Na-Gari
"Alright"	2026	131	Na-Gari
"Love Me Don't Leave Me Alone"	2026	129	Na-Gari

== Videography ==
=== Music videos ===
Title	Year	Director(s)	Ref.
"Best One"	2026	YVNG WING (IDIOTS)	
"Keyvitup"	2026	YVNG WING (IDIOTS)	
"Legendary"	2026	Jongho JP (IDIOTS)	
"Nagari"	2026	—	

=== Other videos ===
Title	Year	Director(s)	Notes	Ref.
"Best One"	2026	Yunhwanz	Performance video	
"Keyvitup"	2026	NOHP (IDIOTS)	Performance video	
"Polaroid"	2026	Keyvitup	Music story	

== Live performances ==
=== Music festivals ===
Event	Date	Location (Note: Venue, City, Country)	Performed song(s)	Ref.
KCON Japan 2026	May 8-10, 2026	Makuhari Messe, Chiba, Japan	"Best One"; "Legendary"; "I Need U (BTS cover); "Keyvitup"	
Boryeong Mud Festival 2026	July 25, 2026	Mud Expo Square, Boryeong, South Korea	"Legendary"	
Jeongnamjin Jangheung Water Festival 2026	July 30, 2026	Tamjin River, Jangheung, South Korea	"Best One"; "Keyvitup"; "I Need U (BTS cover); "Polaroid"; "Legendary"	
KCON LA 2026	August 14-15, 2026	Crypto.com Arena, Los Angeles, United States	"Best One"; "Keyvitup"; "Adrenaline" (Ateez cover); "Polaroid"; "Legendary"; "Maniac" (Stray Kids cover)	
MU:CON Seoul 2026	September 3, 2026	Cube Convention Center, Seoul, South Korea	"Legendary"; "Best One"; "Keyvitup"	
