= Daecheon Beach =

Beach in Boryeong, South Korea

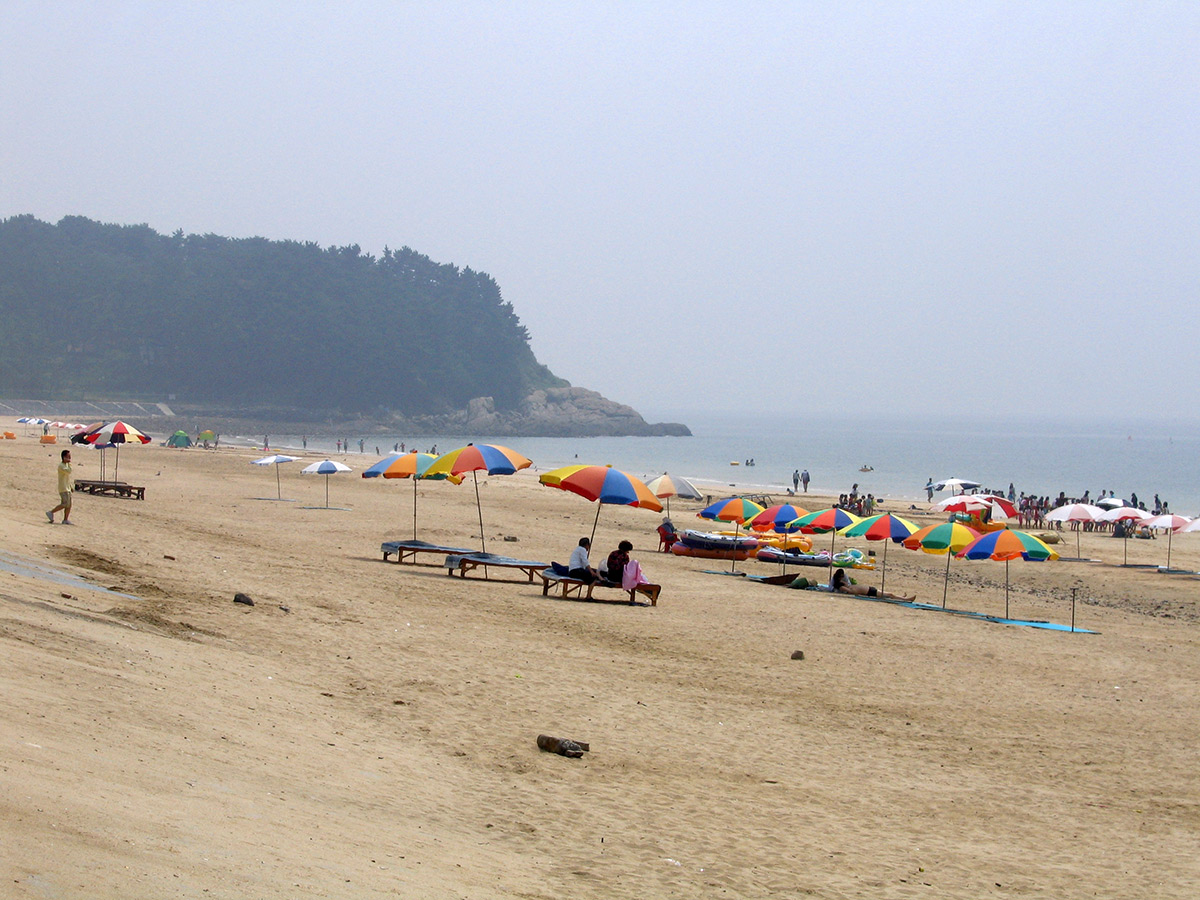
Daecheon Beach

Daecheon Beach is a beach in Boryeong, South Korea. It is the biggest of South Korea's western beaches and stretches 3.5 km.

It's the location of the Boryeong Mud Festival.
