= Choi Si-han =

South Korean writer and literature scholar

Choi Si-han (Hangul 최시한; born 1952) is a South Korean writer, Korean literature scholar, and educator known for his emphasis on storytelling in the classroom. His breakthrough work is Modu areumdaun aideul (모두 아름다운 아이들 All Beautiful Children), a Bildungsroman written in the form of diary entries portraying the confusion and anguish of youths in South Korea's rigid education system.

== Life ==
Choi Si-han was born in Boryeong, South Korea in 1952. Keenly interested in literature as a high school student, he was the president of his school's literature club and aspired to study Korean literature in university. He enrolled in the Korean literature program at Sogang University, where he found his passion in theatre and actively took part in student productions as an actor and director. Due to financial need, however, he began pursuing a career in teaching. He submitted his manuscripts to writing contests in the meantime but found little success. It is during this period that he earned his master's and doctoral degrees in Korean literature at Sogang University. In 1982, he finally made his literary debut with his short story "Naktaui gyeoul" (낙타의 겨울 The Camel's Winter). Caught between teaching and writing, he focused his energies on the former, as he confessed in one interview. His achievements as a literary educator tends to be more recognized than his achievements as a writer. He teaches Korean language and literature at Sookmyung Women's University and was also head of the storytelling department for interdisciplinary majors.

== Writing ==
Choi Si-han penned two short story collections to date. He is best known for his coming-of-age book Modu areumdaun aideul (모두 아름다운 아이들 All Beautiful Children). In diary format, the book portrays the internal turmoil of youths struggling in South Korea's education system. The book has sold steadily since it was printed in 1996 and is already on its 25th print run totaling over 50,000 copies, according to the publisher. One of the stories in the collection, "Heosaengjeoneul baeuneun sigan" (「허생전」을 배우는 시간 Learning the Story of Master Heo in Class), has been included in Korean literature textbooks for high school students. Set in the early 1990s when teacher unions were illegal in South Korea, the story sheds light on the issues of Korean education and suggests the need for students to critically assess literary texts.

== Works ==
Short story collections

- 『모두 아름다운 아이들』, 문학과지성사, 2008.(초판 1996년)
- All Beautiful Children. Moonji, 2008. (First published in 1996)
- 『낙타의 겨울』, 문학과지성사, 1991.
- The Camel's Winter. Moonji, 1991.
