= Kim Seong-Dong =

Korean author (1947–2022)

- Born: 8 November 1947; Boryeong, South Chungcheong, South Korea
- Died: 25 September 2022 (aged 74)
- Occupation: Writer
- Writing career
- Language: Korean

Korean name
- Hangul: 김성동
- Hanja: 金聖東
- RR: Gim Seongdong
- MR: Kim Sŏngdong

Kim Seong-Dong (Note: The romanization preferred by the author according to LTI Korea) (8 November 1947 – 25 September 2022) was a South Korean author.

== Life ==
Kim Seong-Dong was born on 8 November 1947, in Boryeong, Chungcheongnam-do, a son of a communist organizer. In a violent bloodbath that resulted from ideological strife, he lost his father and members of both his paternal and maternal family and grew up stigmatized for his family's communist ties. Kim learned Chinese from his Confucian grandfather, and was able to continue his education in Seoul with the financial support of his relatives.

Upon entry into university, Kim realized that Korean society would bar his path to social advancement due to his being tainted “red by association.” At 19 years old, he chanced to meet an elderly Buddhist monk, after which he gave up dreams of worldly success and followed the monk into Buddhism. At 25, he planned to study abroad in Japan as a student of Buddhism, but even that door was closed to him due to his “communist” background.

Frustrated and confused, Kim finally turned to novel writing. These experiences left a deep impact on him. As a senior at Sorabol High School, he had also joined the Buddhist monastic order to become a disciple of the Zen master Jihyo. When his short story "Moktakjo" was published in Religion Weekly (Jugan jonggyo) in 1975, he was accused of defaming the order and duly excommunicated. Kim Seongdong then returned to the secular world and began working for several magazines and publishing houses. His writing career took off with the publication in 1978 of the novella "Mandala" in the magazine Korean Literature (Hanguk munhak).

== Work ==
Mandala, as the title suggests, deals with Buddhist themes. A depiction of the ten years Kim spent as a Buddhist monk and his eventual return to the secular world, the text addresses the conflict between individual enlightenment and redemption of the humankind as a whole. Ultimately, the author comes to the paradoxical conclusion that 'finding the pure land is impossible in complete separation from the realm of the impure'. Kim's training as a Buddhist monk is also reflected in Distraction (Sallan), The Lamp (Deung), and Descending the Mountain (Hasan), stories that meditate on arduous life of Buddhist ascetics as they struggle to accomplish a 'return to the original Buddha-nature'.

Kim's later works dealing with the brutal legacy of the Korean War also rely on his personal experience. In the trilogy of My Mother and the Frog (Eomma wa gaeguri), The Star (Byeol), and The Waning Moon (Janwol), the recurrent motif of 'Mother's inexplicable stomach pains' is linked to the traumatic impact of the war and national division on ordinary individuals. The author's focus here is not on the war itself but on the survivors of its atrocities who must grapple not only with the material difficulties that continue to exert influence on their lives but with the responsibility of appeasing 'the lonely spirit of Father (read: the dead) still roaming the vast sky'. In One Lonely Hut (Omaksari jip hanchae, 1982), Kim Seong-dong continues his attempts to probe the origin of numerous problems that plague contemporary Korean society; he finds these problems continuous within the unresolved legacy of the Korean War. The House (Jip, 1989), A Glorious Outing (Hwaryeohan oechul, 1989), and Noodles (Guksu, 1995).

Korean director Im Kwon-taek made a successful movie of Mandala in 1981.

=== Awards ===
In 1978 Kim was honoured with Literature Prize for Novelists, an award he refused to accept.

== Works in translation ==
Mandala has been translated into German, Bulgarian, Spanish, French, and English

== Works in Korean (partial) ==
- “My Mother and the Frog” (Eomma wa gaeguri)
- “The Star” (Byeol),
- The Waning Moon" (Janwol
- One Lonely Hut (Omaksari jip hanchae, 1982)
- The House (Jip, 1989)
- A Glorious Outing (Hwaryeohan oechul, 1989)
- Noodles (Guksu, 1995)
