= Daecheon-dong, Boryeong =

- Daecheon Port in Daecheon 5-dong

Korean name
- Hangul: 대천동
- Hanja: 大川洞
- RR: Daecheon-dong
- MR: Taech'ŏn-dong

Daecheon-dong (Korean: 대천동) is a dong (neighborhood) in Boryeong, South Chungcheong Province, South Korea. It is divided in five administrative entities, numbered Daecheon 1-dong to Daecheon 5-dong.
