= Park Solhee =

South Korean writer (born 1990)

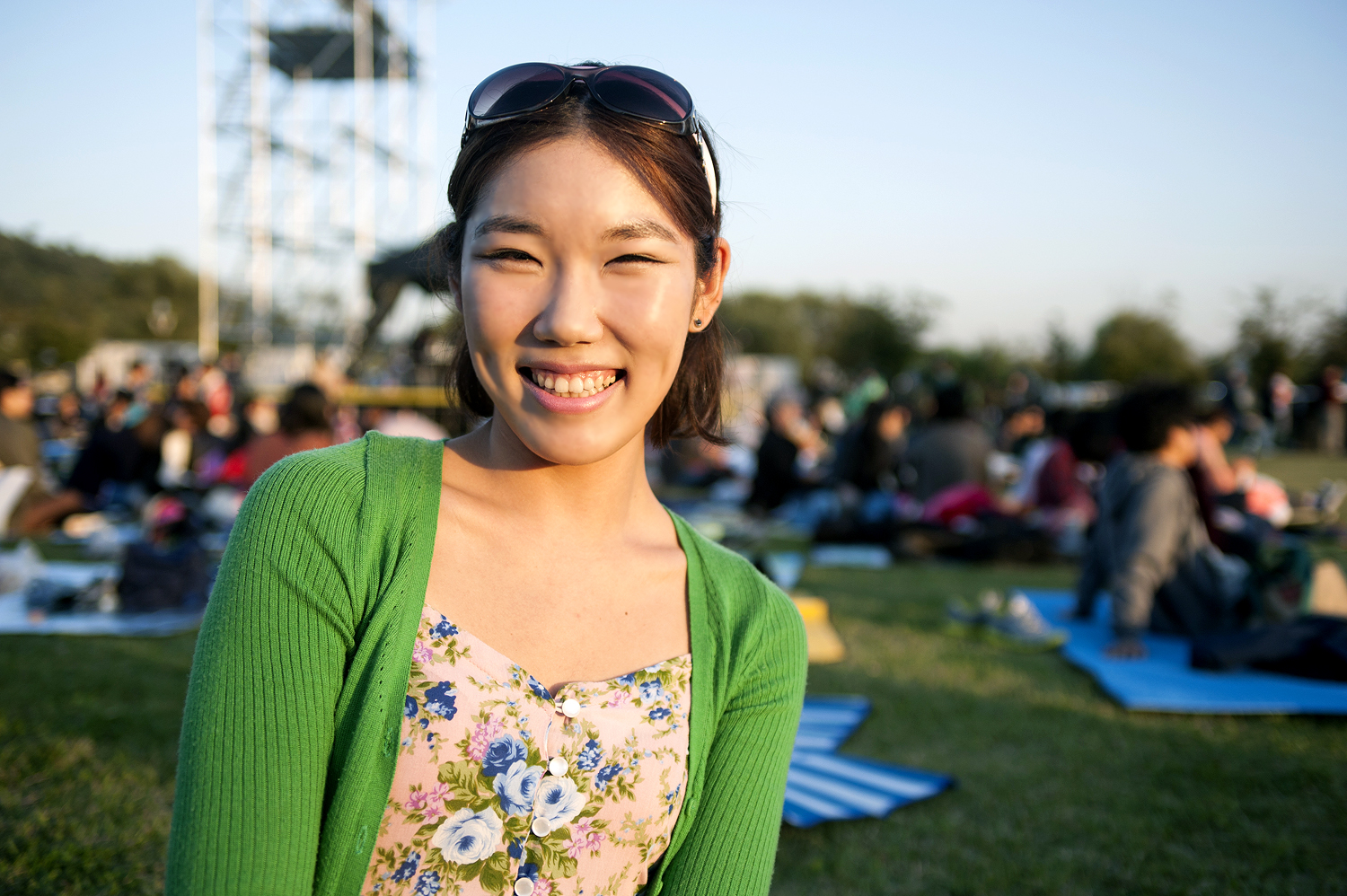
- Park in October 2013
- Born: January 5, 1990 (age 36); South Korea
- Occupation: Writer
- Writing career
- Language: Korean
- Genre: Travel

Korean name
- Hangul: 박솔희
- RR: Bak Solhui
- MR: Pak Sorhŭi

Park Solhee (Korean: 박솔희; born January 5, 1990) is a South Korean writer. She is best known for her travel books Youth on the Railroad (청춘, 내일로) and Complete Guide for Exchange Students (교환학생 완전정복; co-authored). She has gained recognition as the youngest professional travel writer among practical guidebook writers in South Korea. Park published her first book, Youth on the Railroad, in June 2011 when she was 21 years old. Youth on the Railroad received significant attention and positive reviews from South Korean media and has sold more than 12,000 copies as of August 2013. Her second book, Complete Guide for Exchange Students, published in November 2012, also received considerable attention as one of the first travel guidebooks written for prospective foreign exchange students to the United States. Park is active as a freelance writer and columnist while attending Sookmyung Women's University, writing frequent articles and her own columns appearing in various South Korean publications such as Daehaknaeil, Tomorrow, and OhmyNews. She has given public lectures since the publication of her first book aimed at various audiences, including college students, high school students, and readers. Having resided in Seoul for 8 years, she has recently moved to Jeju Island in March 2016. She currently lives in Jeju city.

== Early life and education ==
Park was born on January 5, 1990, in Boryeong, Chungnam Province, South Korea as the first of two children. She has one younger brother. When she was six years old, Park's family moved to Gyeryong, where they currently reside. Park left home when she was 15 years old to attend boarding school. She attended the Attached High School to the Gongju National University of Education, one of the top-ranked high schools in Chungnam Province, graduating in February 2008.

Following high school, Park moved to Seoul, entering Sookmyung Women's University in March 2008 and double majoring in Telecommunications and English Language and Literature. Park took a two-year leave of absence to travel around the world and work on her books and is expected to graduate in February, 2014. Park also attended the University of California, Davis as an exchange student in winter 2012. During the summer of 2013, she studied Chinese language at the East University of Heilongjiang in Harbin.

== Writing ==
=== Youth on the Railroad (청춘, 내일로) ===
Youth on the Railroad is a travel guidebook published in June 2011 by Dreammap Publishing Corporation (도서출판 꿈의지도). The book arose out of Solhee Park's travels throughout South Korea during the summer of 2010 using "Railro Ticket", a seven-day train pass offered for young travelers under 25 years old launched by Korail in 2007. During her five-week journey, Park realized that no domestic travel guidebook then existed for railroad travel, despite the fact that Railro Ticket was rapidly gaining popularity among travelers. Although she lacked professional writing experience and despite her young age, Park decided to focus her efforts on writing a travel guidebook based on her Korail experience.

Park received interest from Dreammap Publishing Corporation and signed a publishing contract in January 2011. After six months of further research and writing, Youth on the Railroad was published.

The book was considered a success and received attention as the first book written by an actual Railro Ticket traveler and college student, yet authored with the same quality and polish as works written by professional travel writers. It vastly changed the Railro market and was listed as a travel category bestseller soon after it was published. The book was publicized through various publications and media, including Daehaknaeil, OhmyNews, Segye Ilbo, MBC Radio, CBS Radio, and other university outlets, which conducted interviews with Park regarding travel tips using Railro Ticket and her motivation to plan and author a book as a college student.

=== Complete Guide for Exchange Students (교환학생 완전정복) ===
Six months after the publication of Youth on the Road, Park moved to the United States to study at the University of California, Davis as an exchange student. There, she began work on her second book, a complete guide to life in the United States as a foreign exchange student. Park was motivated to write Complete Guide for Exchange Students when she noticed that no guidebook yet existed for exchange students in Korea, despite an increasing number of exchange students experiencing difficulties abroad due to lack of information and practical advice. While experiencing campus life at UC Davis, Park interviewed students and performed extensive research to write a comprehensive guidebook for future exchange students. Dreammap Publishing Corporation published Complete Guide for Exchange Students following Park's return to South Korea in 2012.

=== Columns ===
Park writes serial columns for various magazines and publications.

- Pun Media (South Korea's No. 1 1020 Social Media); travel column Railer Park Solhee's Travel Column (September 2013 - current)
- Tomorrow (Monthly Magazine for Young Readers); exchange student column Complete Guide for Exchange Students (March 2013 - current)
- Daehaknaeil (No. 1 University Magazine in South Korea); travel column CouchSurfing USA (June - August 2012)
- Daehaknaeil (No. 1 University Magazine in South Korea); travel column TRIP (September 2011 - February 2012)
- OhmyNews (The World's First and South Korea's No.1 Internet Newspaper); travel column Twenty on the Railroad (July - August 2011)
