= Boryeong =

City in South Chungcheong, South Korea

Coordinates: 36°20′N 126°37′E

- Municipal city
- Panoramic view of Boryeong View of the Oeyeondo Island

- Flag Emblem of Boryeong

- Location in South Korea
- Country: South Korea
- Region: Hoseo
- Administrative divisions: 1 eup, 10 myeon, 5 dong

Government
  - Mayor: Uhm Seung Yong (엄승)

Area
  - Total: 569.01 km^{2} (219.70 sq mi)

Population (September 2024)
  - Total: 94,191
  - Density: 160.5/km^{2} (416/sq mi)
  - Dialect: Chungcheong

Korean name
- Hangul: 보령시
- Hanja: 保寧市
- RR: Boryeong-si
- MR: Poryŏng-si

Boryeong (Korean: 보령; Korean pronunciation: [po.ɾjʌŋ]), commonly known as Daecheon, is a city in South Chungcheong Province, South Korea. Boryeong is known around Korea for its beaches, particularly Daecheon Beach, and the annual Boryeong Mud Festival around July. The city's beach-mud is widely touted for its cosmetic properties. As elsewhere along the southwest coast of the Korean Peninsula, there are numerous small islands, many of which are connected by ferry to Daecheon Port.

Boryeong gained its present boundaries in 1995, with the merger of Boryeong-gun and Daecheon City. Previously, the two entities had been united under the name Boryeong County (Boryeong-gun) since the Joseon Dynasty and had been separated in 1986.

== History ==
It is believed to have been Manro-guk during the Mahan Dynasty, and became Sinchon County in Baekje, and Seonseong County in Silla during the reign of King Gyeongdeok. During the Goryeo Dynasty, it was renamed Boryeong County, the name it still uses today.

Originally, there were three towns, Boryeong, Ocheon, and Nampo, but on 1 April 1914, it was merged into Boryeong-gun as part of the Japanese administrative reorganisation. In that year, the county government office was moved from Shinseong-ri (now Boryeong-ri) in Jupo-myeon to Daecheon-myeon.

== Toponymy ==
The city is commonly known as either Boryeong or Daecheon. The name "Boryeong" is older.

== Location, description ==
Boryeong is on the coast of the Yellow Sea, 171 km south of Seoul.

Its administrative district includes 12 administrative divisions: Cheonbuk-myeon, Cheongso-myeon, Ocheon-myeon, Jupo-myeon, Cheongra-myeon, Jugyo-myeon, Daecheon-dong, Seonju-myeon, Nampo-myeon, Misan-myeon, Ungcheon-eup and Jusan-myeon.

Its territory includes a large portion of sea and numerous islands, among which the largest is Wonsando; other islands are Sapsido, Nokdo, Oeyeondo, Janggodo, Godaedo, Hodo, and many islets.

As Seohae is a coastal area with a developed Ria coast, there are areas that have been reclaimed from the sea. If you look at Nampo-myeon, Jugyo-myeon, and Cheongcheong-myeon, there is a large farmland along the sea, which was created by reclamation.

It also includes several mountains: Seongjusan Mountain, Oseosan Mountain, Amisan Mountain and Okmasan Mountain.

== Tourism ==
As it is relatively close to the capital, Daecheon Beach attracts huge crowds during the summer season. Since 1998, the Boryeong Mud Festival has been held every year in mid-July.

== Transport ==
Boryeong is located on the Janghang Line railroad, which connects it to Seoul via the Gyeongbu Line.
Daecheon Station was opened on December 21, 2007, replacing the old station (now closed) in downtown Boryeong. It can be reached by foot, by bus or by expressway. The Janghang Line is the only railway line serving Daecheon station. The main stations served by this line are Yongsan (Seoul), Cheonan, and Iksan. Millions of people use this line to get to Daecheon every year.

The Seohaean Expressway 15 runs from Seoul through Boryeong and further south to Mokpo (102 km).

== Climate ==
Climate data for Boryeong (1991–2020 normals, extremes 1972–present)
| Month | Jan | Feb | Mar | Apr | May | Jun | Jul | Aug | Sep | Oct | Nov | Dec | Year |
|---|---|---|---|---|---|---|---|---|---|---|---|---|---|
| Record high °C (°F) | 17.8 (64.0) | 20.0 (68.0) | 26.8 (80.2) | 29.1 (84.4) | 31.6 (88.9) | 32.6 (90.7) | 37.8 (100.0) | 36.4 (97.5) | 37.1 (98.8) | 30.8 (87.4) | 25.6 (78.1) | 18.5 (65.3) | 37.8 (100.0) |
| Mean daily maximum °C (°F) | 4.2 (39.6) | 6.2 (43.2) | 10.8 (51.4) | 16.7 (62.1) | 21.9 (71.4) | 25.7 (78.3) | 28.4 (83.1) | 29.8 (85.6) | 26.2 (79.2) | 20.7 (69.3) | 13.7 (56.7) | 6.7 (44.1) | 17.6 (63.7) |
| Daily mean °C (°F) | −0.2 (31.6) | 1.2 (34.2) | 5.5 (41.9) | 11.1 (52.0) | 16.5 (61.7) | 21.1 (70.0) | 24.8 (76.6) | 25.7 (78.3) | 21.2 (70.2) | 15.1 (59.2) | 8.6 (47.5) | 2.1 (35.8) | 12.7 (54.9) |
| Mean daily minimum °C (°F) | −4.4 (24.1) | −3.3 (26.1) | 0.4 (32.7) | 5.7 (42.3) | 11.7 (53.1) | 17.1 (62.8) | 21.9 (71.4) | 22.3 (72.1) | 16.9 (62.4) | 10.1 (50.2) | 4.1 (39.4) | −2.0 (28.4) | 8.4 (47.1) |
| Record low °C (°F) | −17.6 (0.3) | −16.4 (2.5) | −9.6 (14.7) | −5.2 (22.6) | 2.2 (36.0) | 6.6 (43.9) | 13.8 (56.8) | 12.1 (53.8) | 4.8 (40.6) | −1.3 (29.7) | −8.1 (17.4) | −16.0 (3.2) | −17.6 (0.3) |
| Average precipitation mm (inches) | 22.6 (0.89) | 30.2 (1.19) | 42.0 (1.65) | 72.7 (2.86) | 87.5 (3.44) | 134.0 (5.28) | 248.1 (9.77) | 270.3 (10.64) | 135.4 (5.33) | 59.9 (2.36) | 53.7 (2.11) | 35.0 (1.38) | 1,191.4 (46.91) |
| Average precipitation days (≥ 0.1 mm) | 8.1 | 6.4 | 7.0 | 7.5 | 8.1 | 8.6 | 13.8 | 12.1 | 7.8 | 6.0 | 8.7 | 10.8 | 104.9 |
| Average snowy days | 9.7 | 5.8 | 2.0 | 0.1 | 0.0 | 0.0 | 0.0 | 0.0 | 0.0 | 0.0 | 2.6 | 8.0 | 28.0 |
| Average relative humidity (%) | 69.0 | 67.3 | 67.4 | 67.4 | 72.0 | 77.4 | 83.8 | 80.8 | 76.3 | 71.6 | 69.5 | 69.2 | 72.6 |
| Mean monthly sunshine hours | 160.8 | 175.8 | 217.1 | 225.9 | 237.8 | 203.7 | 162.3 | 193.8 | 203.1 | 211.5 | 165.7 | 153.5 | 2,311 |
| Percentage possible sunshine | 52.5 | 58.4 | 58.8 | 60.2 | 57.1 | 50.6 | 42.1 | 52.8 | 58.7 | 64.6 | 54.7 | 51.4 | 54.9 |
Source: Korea Meteorological Administration (snow and percent sunshine 1981–2010)

== Notable sites ==
=== Daecheon Beach ===
Daecheon Beach is about 3 km away from Boryeong (up to 12 km, depending on the original or destination point). It is linked to Boryeong by a public bus line.

=== Daecheun Port ===
Daecheun Port shelters Republic of Korea Navy's 3rd Fleet since 2013, including a patrol class corvette (1,270 t, 88.3 m length, 10 m width, 25.2 m height).

See also Incheon-class frigate and Daegu-class frigate.

=== Wosando island ===
Wosando, or Wonsan Island, formerly known as Koman Island, is the second biggest island in Chungnam Province (behind Anmyeondo in Taean County). It is accessed by a 30-minutes boat journey from Daecheon Port, landing at Jeodu. It is also connected to mainland Taean-gun by the Wonsan-Anmyeon Grand Bridge (National Highway 77) to the north, and by a 7-km long undersea tunnel to the south - the longest submarine tunnel in Korea.

The largest village is Seonchon, a 10-minutes walk away from Jeodu. Wonsando beach has long been known for its fine quartz sand, gentle gradient, clean seawater, suitable water temperature and gentle tide due to its south-facing position. Fishing in the rocky part of the beach can bring greenlings (ray-finned fishes), arenomya (clams) and black porgy (a species of wrasse); various shellfishes can be found in the sand, and the rocks shelter Macrophthalmus (Mareotis) laevis (a species of crab). As of 2024, heavy tourist development is planned for the island.

Wonsando has 3 main specialties: the salted sand lance, the Wonsando laver and the small green onion. The mass-produced salted sand lance, well-known in Boryeong, is an anchovy with a size range between 15 cm and 25 cm, salted solely with sun-dried salt then preserved at room temperature for one year.

=== Hodo Island ===
Hodo, or Ho Island, 24 km offshore from Daecheon port, is a small and quiet island with 60 households mainly gathered in a village located on its north-east coast. It boasts a 1.5 km long, bow-shaped beach of fine sand. A good place to eat abalone, turban shell or sea urchin, the island has so far avoided tourist developments.

Hodo Island was severely affected by the 2007 oil spill in Taean area to the north. Hundreds of volunteers worked to clean the area and prevent the oil from spreading in the sea with the tides. Many of the volunteers came from the public schools as a result of a direct appeal by the South Korean government relayed through the provincial school districts.

=== Seongjusan National Forest ===
The Seongjusan National Forest (or Seongjusan Recreational Forest), east of Boryeong, is in the Charyeongsan Mountains. It is linked to the town by a bus line and can be reached by driving to the entrance of Mt. Seongjusan ("san" means "mountain" in Korean). Seongjusan's altitude is 677 m. A hiking trail leads from the visitor's parking area to the top and around. The water is pure and unspoiled as there are no large domesticated animals living above the flow of the water; the wooden spoon provided is used by all visitors.

=== Temples ===
There are a few Korean temples in this region, notably Seodoksa, Muryangsa, and Goransa ("-sa" being the Korean word for temple).
Goransa is in an unlikely location at the bottom of a steep hill near the Han River, in the part of the province that is famous for having been the center of the Baekje Dynasty. Goransa is reached via the city of Buyeo, by car or bus.
Muryangsa can also be reached by car or bus.
Seodoksa can be reached by car, bus, or train.

=== Dinosaur footprint fossils ===
Dinosaur footprint fossils are found near Yeongseong Beach, on the small island of Hakseong-ri, in Cheonbuk-myeon, some 25 km north of Boryeong.

=== Other sites ===
Other notable sites are Seongjusaji temple, Ocheon Chungcheong Suyeongseong fortress, Boryeong fortress and gate, Nampo Gwanamun (gate), Oeyeondo evergreen forest, Mugunghwa Arboretum, Boryeong Museum, Cheongso station and Galmaemot catholic shrine.

=== Festivals ===
Besides the now internationally famous Boryeong Mud Festival, the area holds several other festivals:

- Cheonbuk Oyster Festival, mid December in Jangeun-ri (in Cheonbuk-myeon), about 26 km north of Boryeong
- Muchangpo Mystic Sea Road Festival, held in mid-August when the sea parts over 1.5 km between Muchangpo Beach and Seokdaedo Island at the full moon and at the end of the month, at Muchangpo Beach (in Gwandang-ri, 12 km south of Daecheon port)
- Muchangpo Shrimp & Gizzard Shad Festival, held mid-September – early October in Muchangpo port (just north of Muchangpo Beach), at the time of year when the dotted gizzard shad (Konosirus punctatus) is at its fattest and most savory
- Muchangpo Jukkumi and Dodari Festival, held mid-March – early April at Muchangpo port, with a focus on jukkumi (Webfoot octopus)
- Seongjusan Autumn Leaves Festival in Meokbanggyegok-gil (Meokbanggyegok one-way street), Seongju-myeon; with drawing contest, pumbaa's performance, youth trot song festival, prize lottery and fireworks
- Jusan Spring Flower Festival in April in Jusanbeokkot-ro ("ro" meaning a 2 to 7-lane street), Jusan-myeon, about 20 km south of Boryeong
- Daecheon Winter Sea Love Festival in December at Daecheon Beach, with lights & Korean paper lanterns at night, fireworks...

== Economy ==
=== Mines ===
Up to the 1980s, the economy was dominated by the local mines - mainly coal but also tremolite, a highly carcinogenic element exploited for several decades since 1930 (tremolite asbestos), and other elements.

The economy slumped after the closure of the local mines around 1990. That same decade saw the first promotion of the mud from the mud flats or getbol as a medium for the development of tourism, in the hope of boosting the local economy. This started in 1994 with the creation of Daecheon Natural Mud Massage House, Boryeong's first tourist business; 1998 saw the first Mud Festival, which was more successful than expected and has since reached international notoriety.

There is a coal mining museum near the Seongjusan National Forest, east of Boryeong. It opened in 2016.

One former mining gallery on the slopes of Seongjusan Mountain, several hundreds of meter long, has been turned into a cooling tunnel called the Boryeong Spring Cool Tunnel & Rest Area. It remains at a steady temperature of around 12 °C even in summer. This is one of the former mining galleries where mushrooms are grown, and button mushrooms cultivated there are cooked on-site for dining on the spot.
Another former mining gallery was to be transformed into an underground water-themed amusement park, but drainage problems and subsequent concerns about potential flooding led to localizing the park in Okmasan forest instead. It should open for the summer season of year 2025. But one of the abandoned tunnels will become a cold wind bath.

There are still in Boryeong 24 non-metallic mineral mining and quarrying companies, extracting stones, construction sand and gravel, or miscellaneous non-metallic minerals except fuels.

=== Agriculture ===
Western mushrooms and other mushrooms are raised in some closed mines, including the Boryeong Spring Cool Tunnel & Rest Area mentioned above. Grape from the Nampo area is noted for its sweet taste. Various edible greens are produced around Misan (some 20 km south-east of Boryeong), including seasoned aster. Painted maple from the forest on Seongjusan Mountain provide their sap. Sungdong-ri in Jusan is known for its strawberries, Chungso for its chestnut trees, Jupo for its sun-dried salt.

=== Seafood ===
The economy is diverse. Seafood is still sold at the public market in Boryeong despite the rapid westernization that is occurring. Most of the produce vendors are elderly citizens. Consequently, the old and the new have collided in Boryeong, making it an example of "Dynamic Korea", the governments phrase to describe Korea in the 21st century. Most of the fresh produce and seafood vendors do not have shops; they set up stalls on the sidewalks in front of other businesses. Thursdays are public market days.

=== Offshore wind farm ===
Boryeong offshore wind farm is planned, with Komipo (Korea Midland Power) as owner and Hanwha E & C as developer. The planned cost is 200 billion won for an expected production of 1.0 GW, a planned economic impact of 1 trillion won over five years and the planned creation of more than 7,500 jobs. As of September 2023, the project is opposed by local fishermen on the grounds that it will hinder the fishing industry. The Ministry of National Defense has also expressed disapproval, stating that it will affect military radio waves, missile firing drills and radars that guard the sea. These oppositions have so far delayed the project.

As of 2024, other offshore wind farms are also planned on the west coast of South Korea: Taean (1.96 GW, for 14.9 trillion won), Boryeong 1.0 GW (6 trillion won), Boryeong Nokdo 320 MW (2 trillion won), Incheon 2.5 GW, and Jeonbuk 2.5 GW. These planned wind farms would reach a production of 8.28 GW, for a total cost of over 50 trillion won.
See also Taean Power Station, a coal power station.

== Education ==
Boryeong public schools are operated by the Chungnam Office of Education. There are numerous schools in the Chungnam Province which includes the city of Boryeong.

== Sister cities ==
Boryeong is twinned with:

- Fujisawa, Japan
- Hangu (Tianjin), China
- Qingpu (Shanghai), China
- Sakai, Japan
- Shoreline, United States
- Takahama, Japan

== Notable people ==
- Yi Ji-ham (1517–1578), scholar and seer
- Lee Mun-ku (1941–2003), novelist
- Yoon Bok-hee (b. 1946), singer-songwriter and musical actress
- Kim Seong-Dong (b. 1947), author
- Choi Si-han (b. 1952), writer, Korean literature scholar, and educator
- Deok-Kyo Oh (b. 1952), theologian and politician
- Lee Sun-hee (b. 1964), singer-songwriter
- Nam Ki-won (b. 1966), para table tennis player and Olympic medalist
- Park Jang-soon (b. 1968), freestyle wrestler, world champion and Olympic gold medalist
- Nam Hee-suk (b. 1971), comedian and MC
- Kim Tae-ho (b. 1975), television director
- Lee Dae-hyung (b. 1983), baseball player
- Jun Tae-soo (1984–2018), actor
- Park Solhee (b. 1990), writer
- Ha Ji-won (b. 1978), actress

== See also ==
- Administrative divisions of South Korea
- List of cities in South Korea
