= Boryeong Mud Festival =

Annual summer festival in South Korea

Boryeong Mud Festival: 보령머드축제; 保寧머드祝祭; Boryeong meodeu chukje
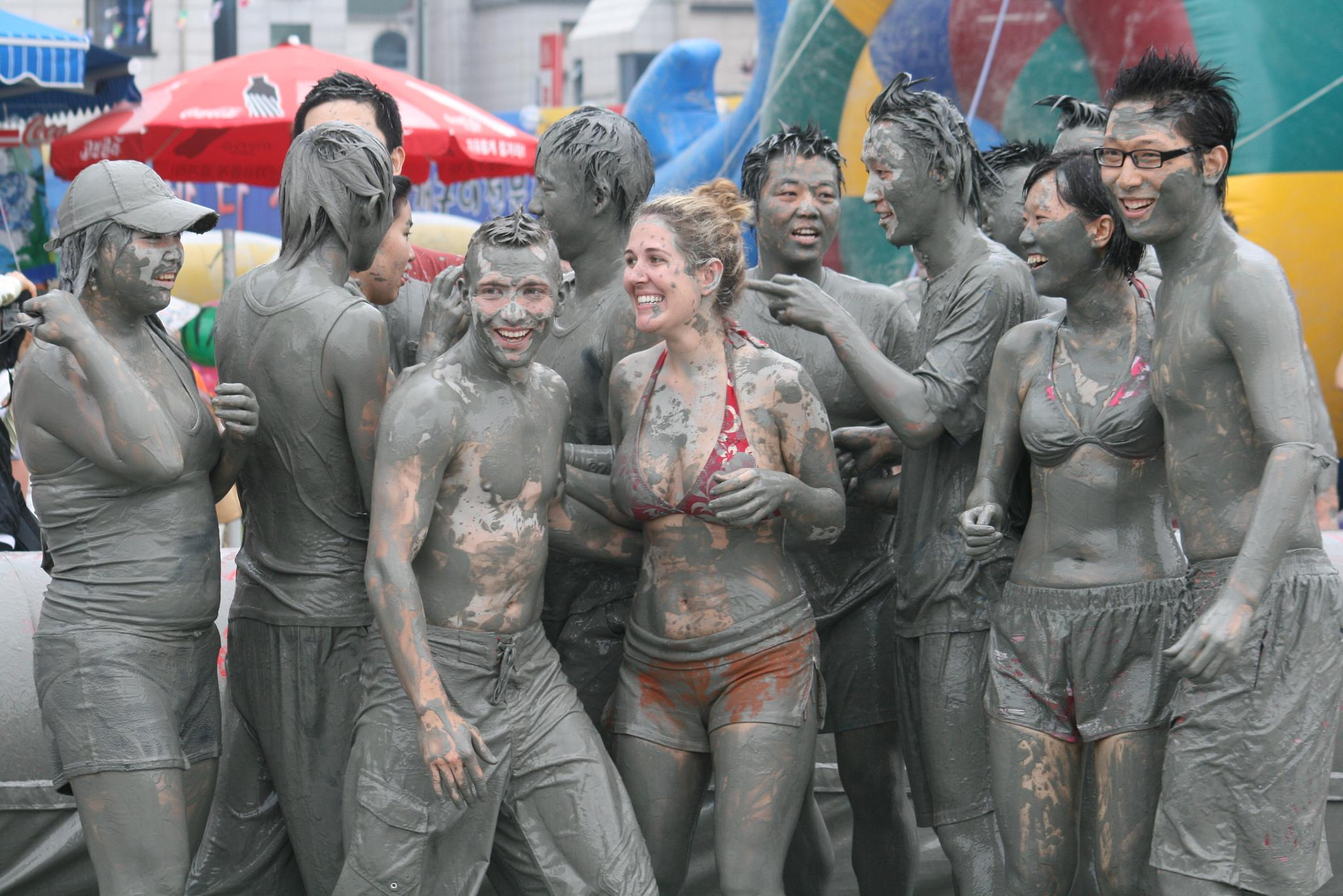
- Genre: Festival
- Date: July
- Frequency: Annually
- Locations: Boryeong, Chungcheongnam-do, South Korea
- Coordinates: 36.304°N 126.517°E
- Inaugurated: 1998

The Boryeong Mud Festival (Korean: 보령머드축제) is an annual festival which takes place during the summer on Daecheon Beach (대천해수욕장) near Boryeong, a town some 200 km south of Seoul, South Korea. The first Mud Festival was staged in 1998 and, by 2007, the festival attracted 2.2 million visitors to Boryeong.

The mud is taken from the Boryeong mud flats, and trucked to the Daecheon beach area, where it is used as the centrepiece of the 'Mud Experience Land'. The mud is considered rich in minerals and used to manufacture cosmetics. The festival was originally conceived as a marketing vehicle for Boryeong mud cosmetics.

Although the festival takes place over a period of around two weeks, it is most famous for its final weekend, which is popular with Korea's western population. The final weekend of the festival is usually on the second weekend in July.

== History ==
Mud flats or getbol

Until the 1990s, Daecheon's mud flats, or getbol, made the beach unappealing to tourists — although they are very important for migrating birds and other fauna. (Note: Daecheon's mud flats (or getbol) are among the tidal flats on the western coast of the Korean peninsula. All of them are on the same flypath as the Migratory Bird Sanctuaries along the Coast of Yellow Sea-Bohai Gulf of China (in China), which were inscribed in 2019 as a World Heritage site on the basis of criterion (x). But as of 2019, the getbol does not meet integrity requirements and only partially meets protection and management requirements for the World Heritage List. The proposed site includes Seocheon getbol (6,809 ha plus a 3,657 ha buffer zone, some 20 km south of Boryeong); Gochang getbol (6,466 ha plus a 1,785 ha buffer zone, 130 km north of Boryeong, in North Jeolla Province); Shinan getbol (110,086 ha plus a 67,254 ha buffer zone, 150 km north of Boryeong, in Anyang, Gyeonggi Province); and Boseong-Suncheon getbol (5,985 ha plus a 14,801 ha buffer zone, 220 to 240 km south of Boryong, in South Jeolla Province). According to Koh & Khim (2014), between 1980 and 2014 land reclamation has destroyed over 1000 square kilometers of tidal mudflat habitat on Korea's western coast.)

Some time around the beginning of the 1990s, Boryeong's coal mines closed. They had been an important part of the region's economy, which plummeted with their closure.
In 1994, Mayor of Daecheon Park Sang-don was inspired by a movie scene showing a couple enjoying a mud bath. He saw in it a possible boost to the local economy while turning around the mud flats' poor reputation. He also came across a study of the mud on Korean beaches by Jae-Bek Kim, a pharmacy professor at Wonkwang University, which demonstrated that the mud from Boryeong mud flats was particularly rich in bentonite and germanium, both beneficial for the skin.

Daecheon Natural Mud Massage House, Boryeong's first tourist business, opened in July 1994. Kim Hak-hyun was elected as mayor on June 1995, and in September 1995 the grand prize in Korea National Business Competition was attributed to the Boryeong mud mask project. In 1996 and 1997, the new mayor pushed for the development of 8 types of mud cosmetics but these had little commercial success as the product was mostly unknown. During that period, the Culture and Tourism department of Boryeong required a research to improve Boryeong's Manse cultural festival, one of the five annual festivals held locally; (Note: Boryeong-si had five festivals in 1997: Crab festival, Manse Boryeong cultural festival, Hannae crossing Doldari, Cheonbuk oyster festival, and Daecheon beach cultural festival.) in 1998 Jeong Kang-hwan (정강환), professor at Pai Chai University, was the first one to propose a festival focusing on mud — originally somehow linked to the Manse cultural festival — as a way to attract tourists and spread the awareness of the mud products. The first Boryeong Mud Festival was held at Daecheon Beach from 16 to 19 July 1998. Its success exceeded all expectations. It has since then reached international recognition, with visitors from all over the world.

== Attractions ==
For the period of the festival several large attractions are erected in the seafront area of Daecheon. These include a mud pool, mud slides, mud prison and mud skiing competitions. This is a ticketed event and the tickets can be purchased online or at the venue. Colored mud is also produced for body painting. A large stage is erected on the beach, which is used for live music, competitions and various other visual attractions. In 2023 the "mud barbecue" was added.

A small market runs along the seafront selling cosmetics made using the mud from Boryeong. Various health and beauty clinics offer massages, acupuncture and other treatments utilising the medicinal qualities of the mud. The festival ends with a large firework display.

== Gallery ==
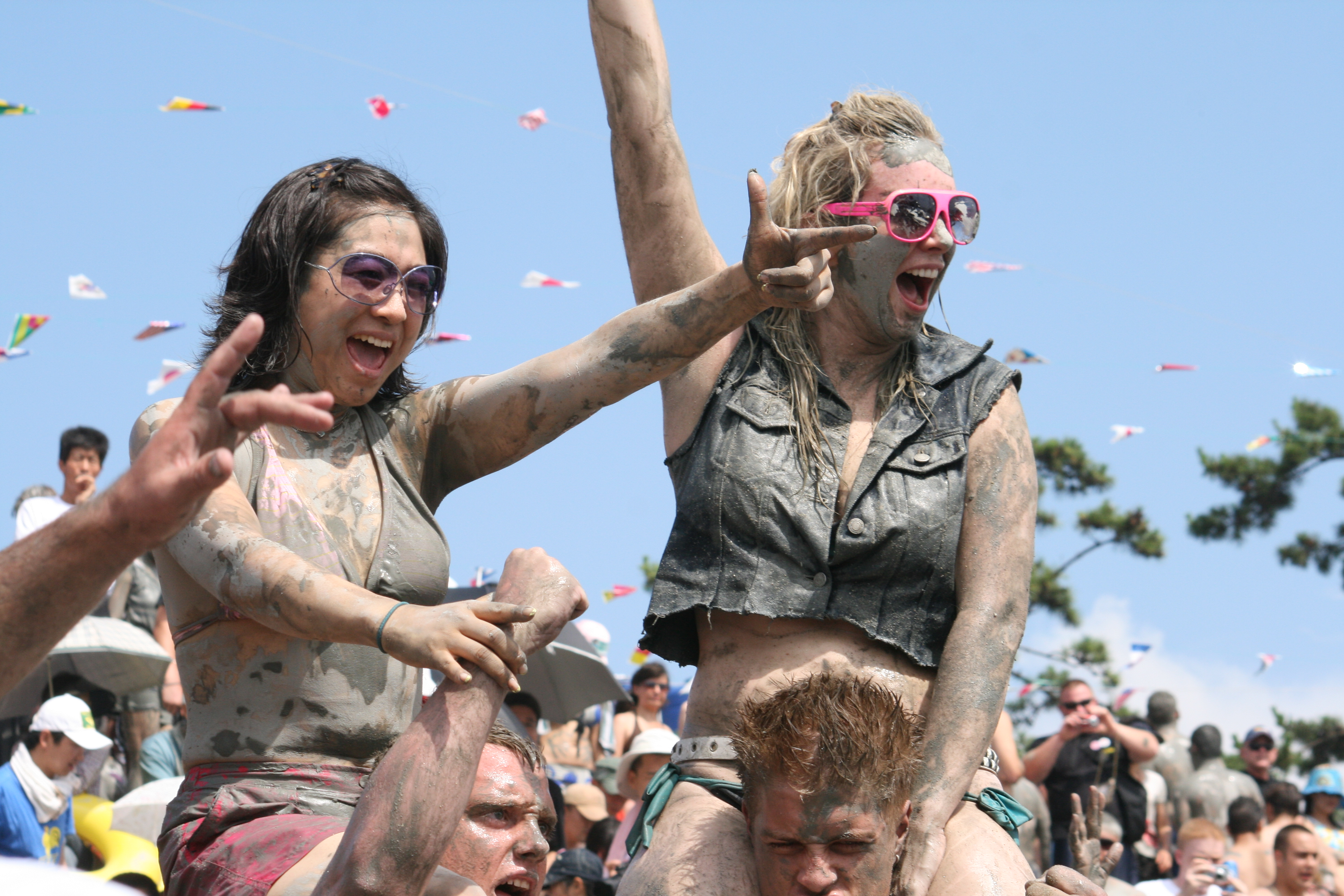

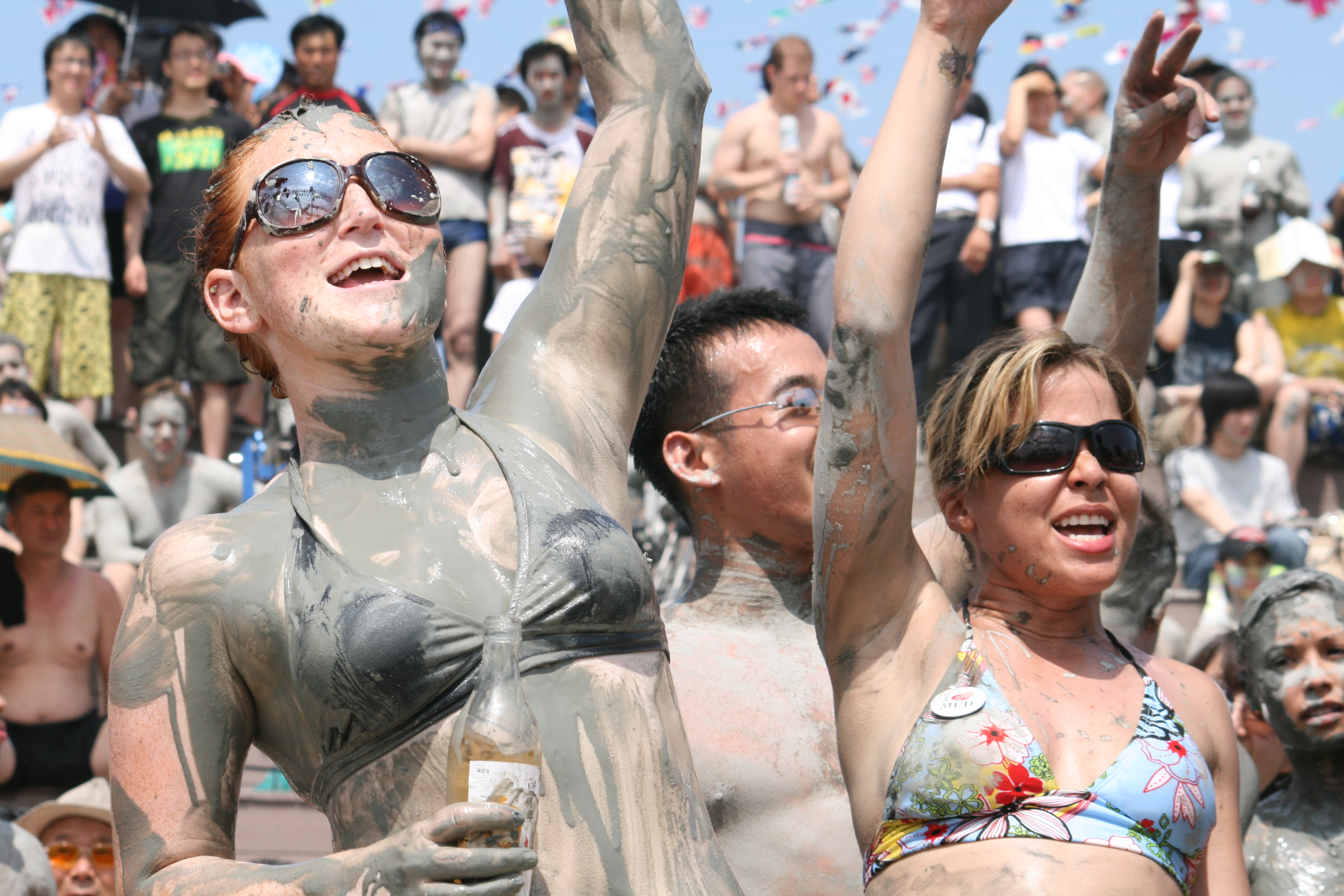

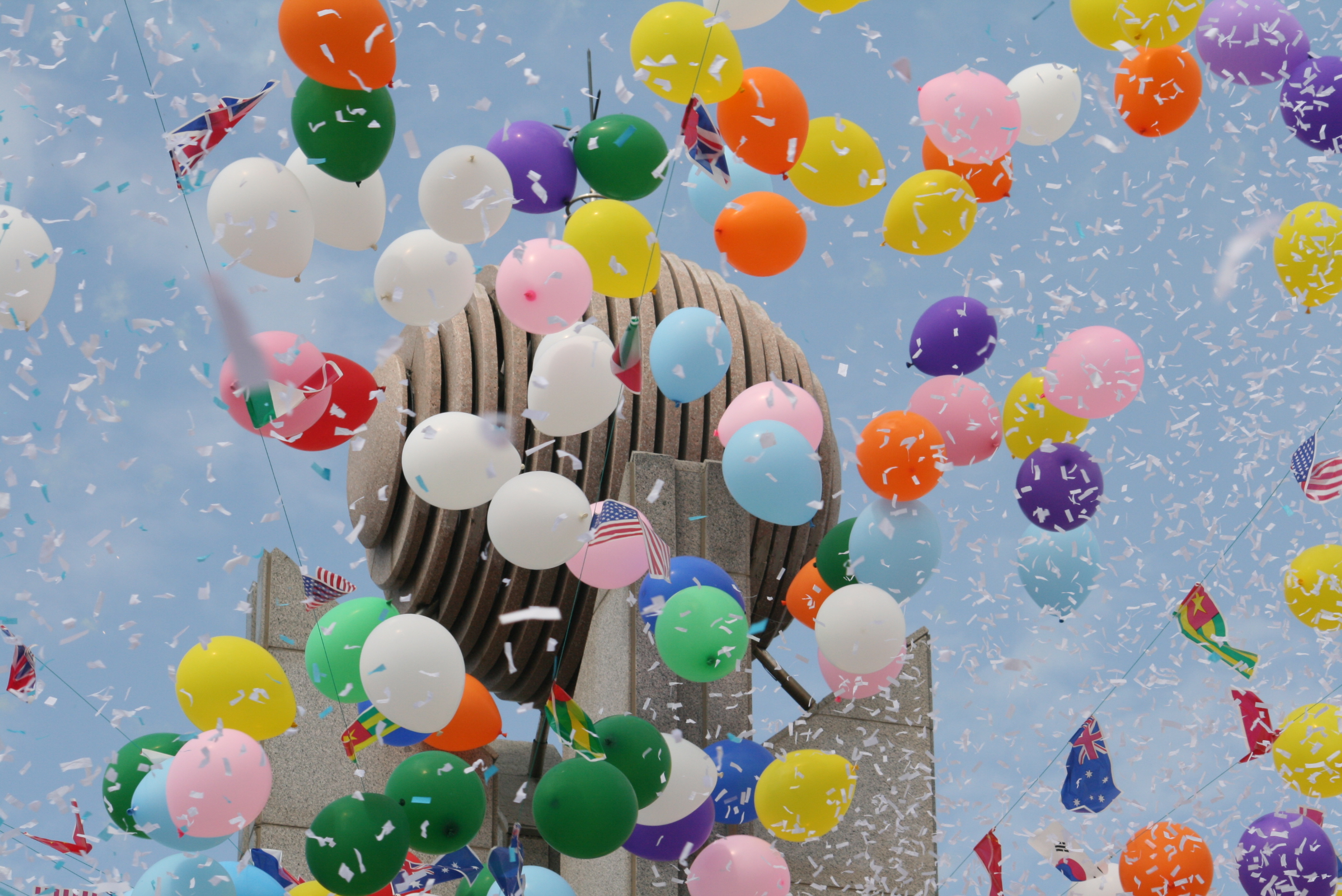

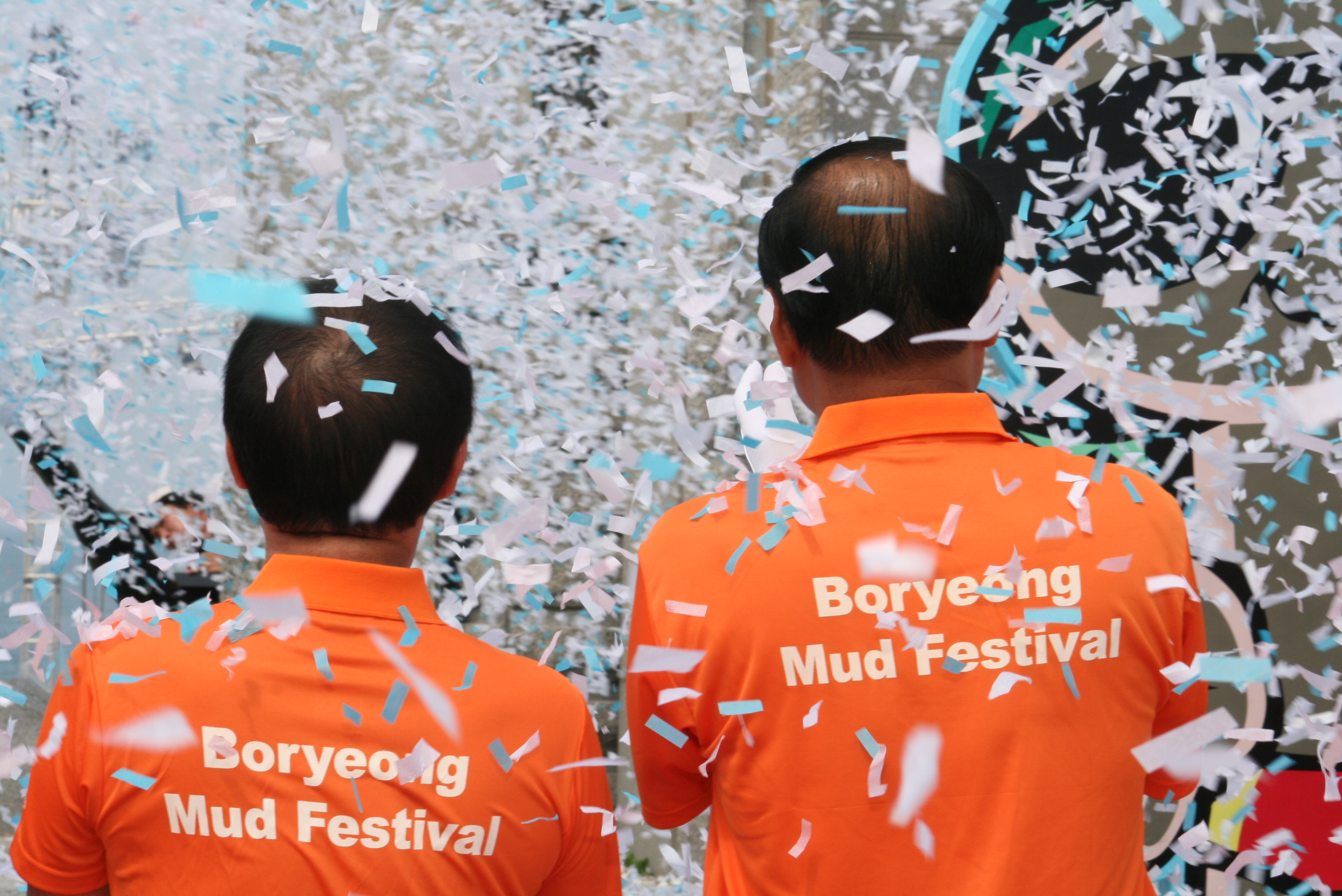

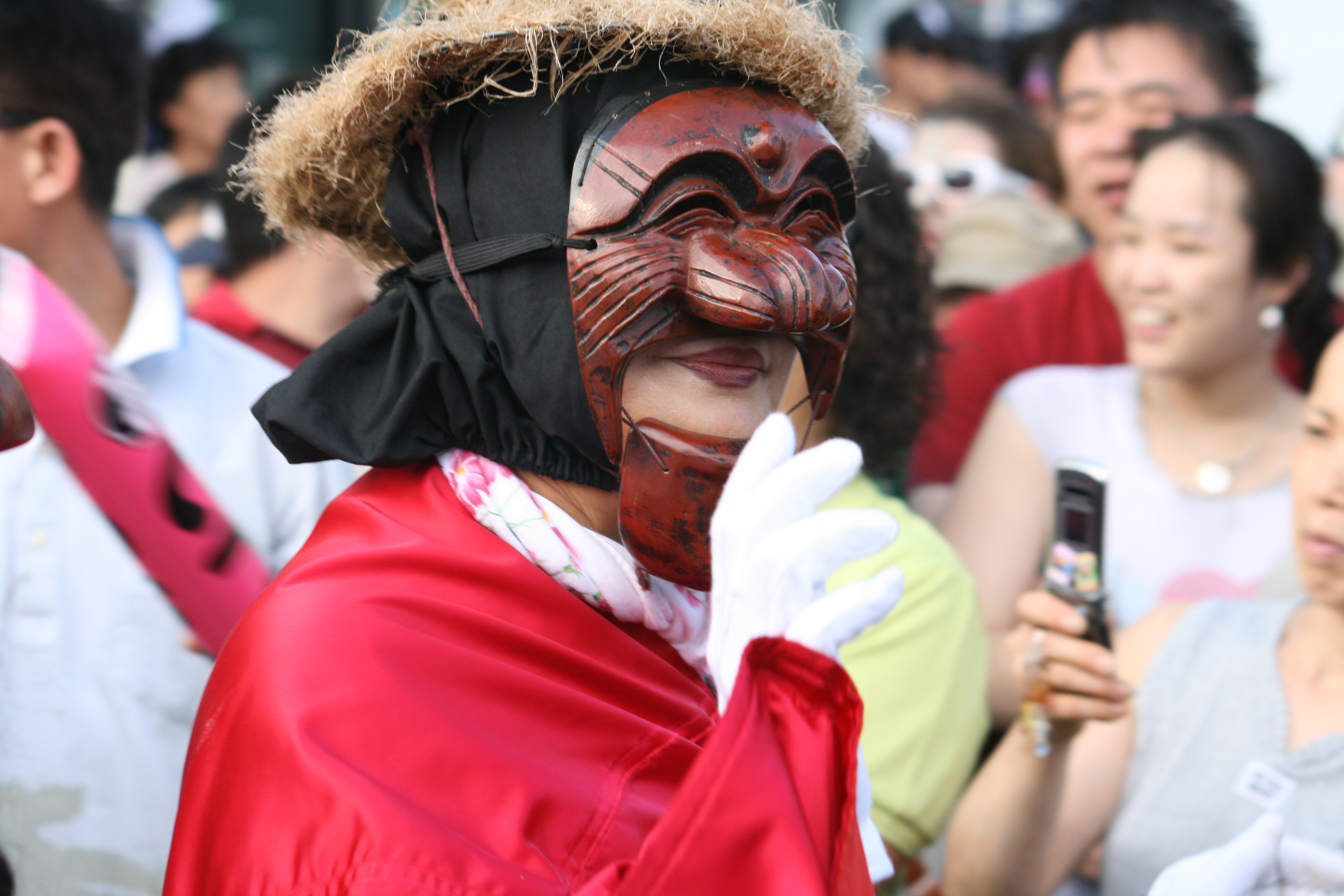

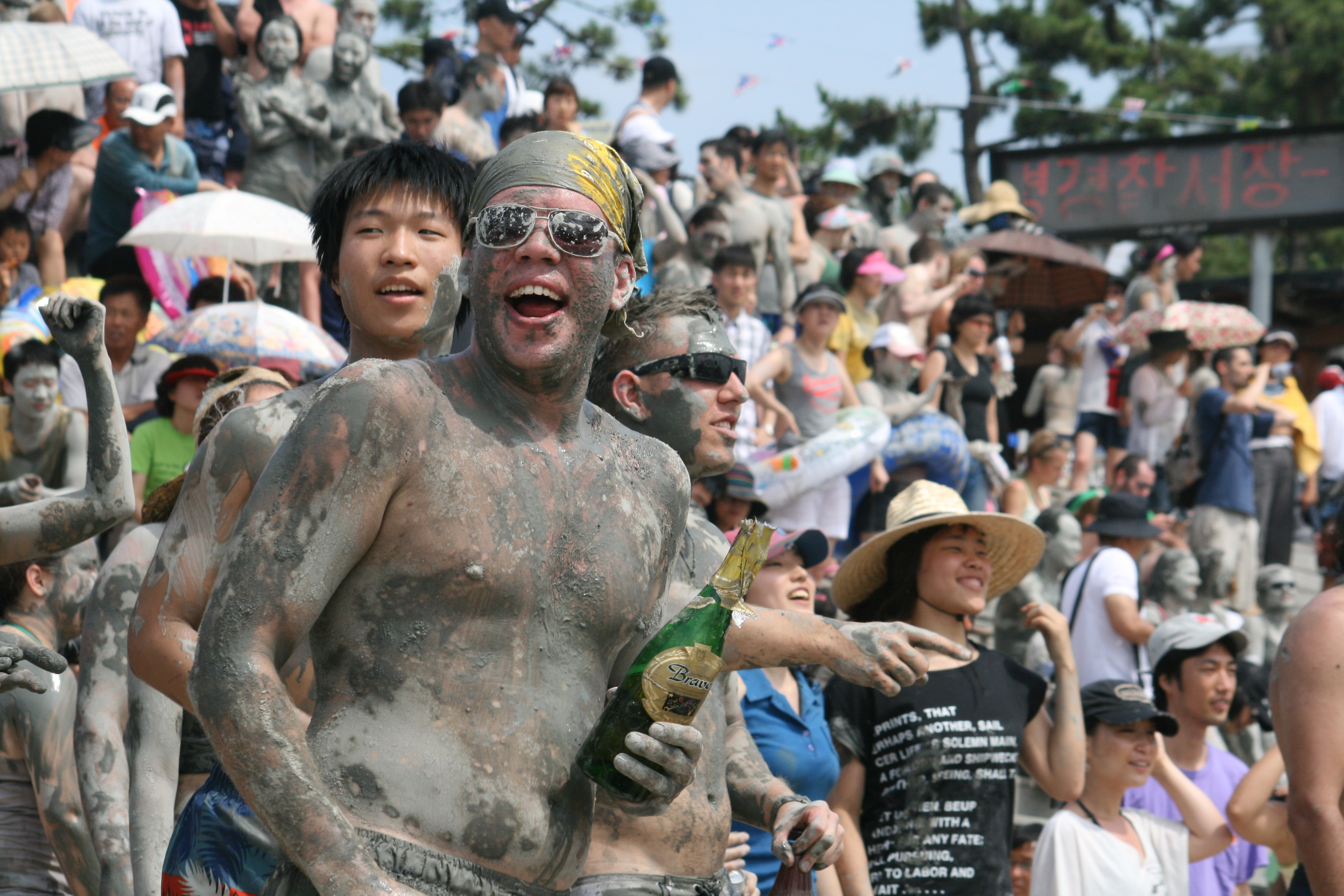

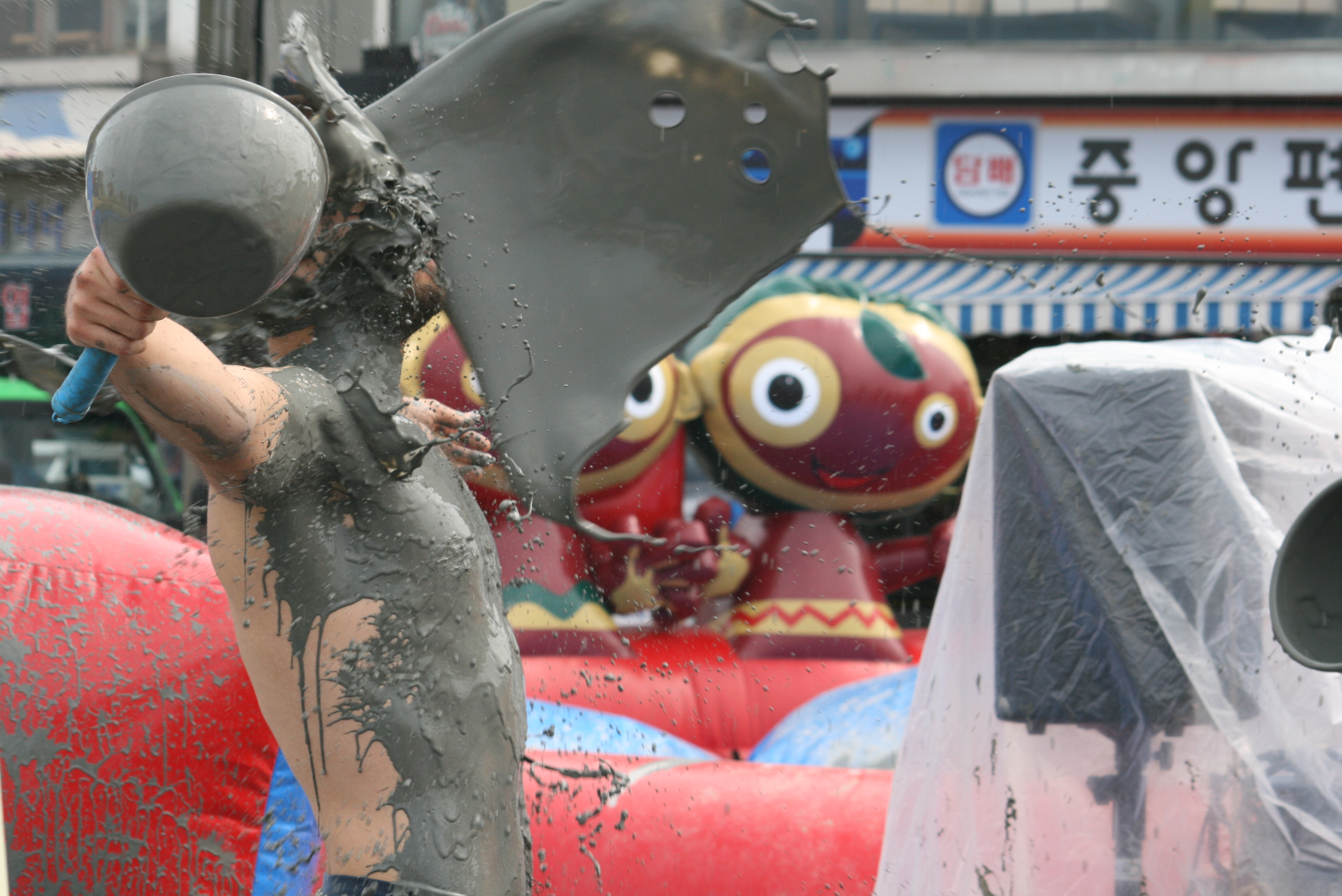

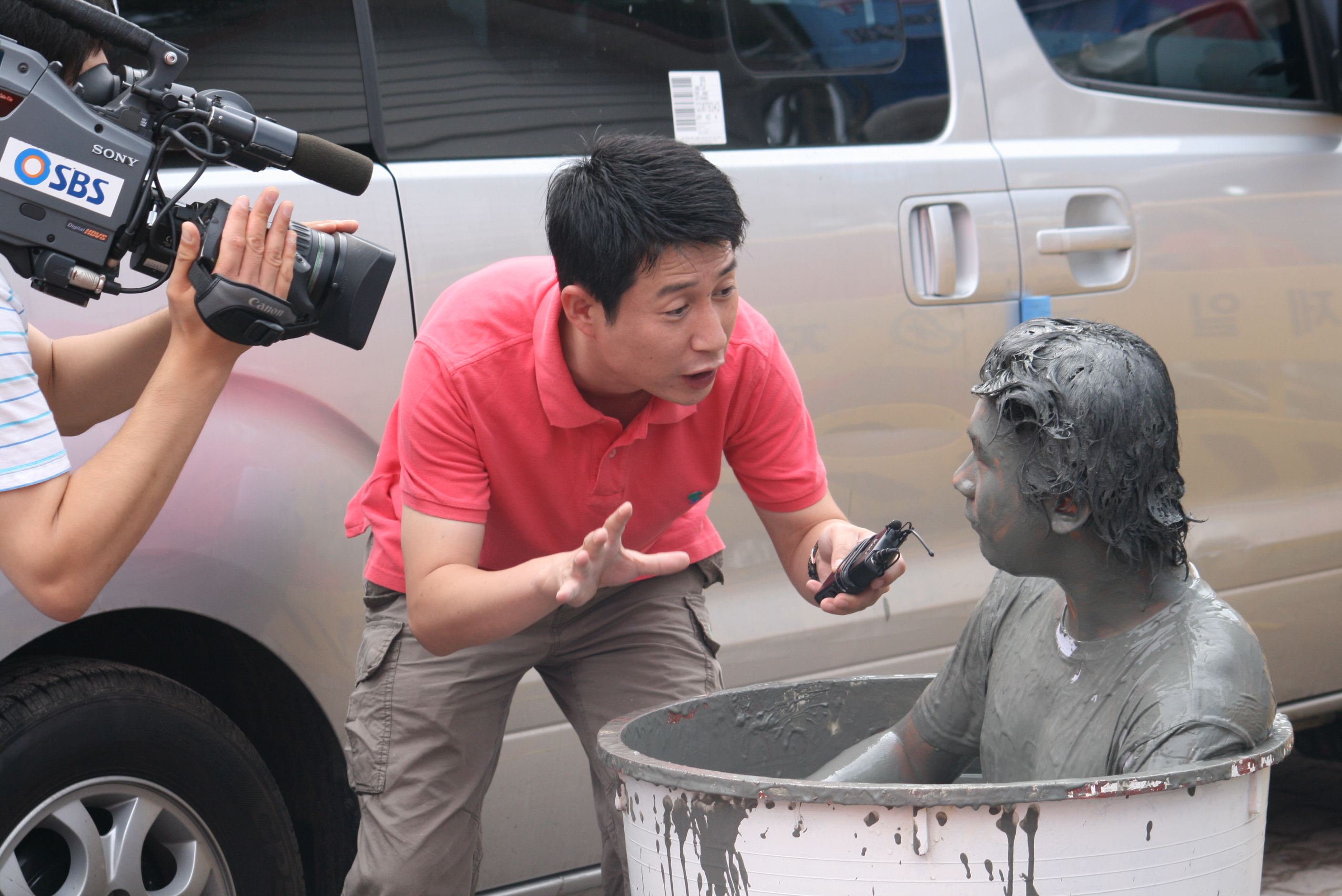

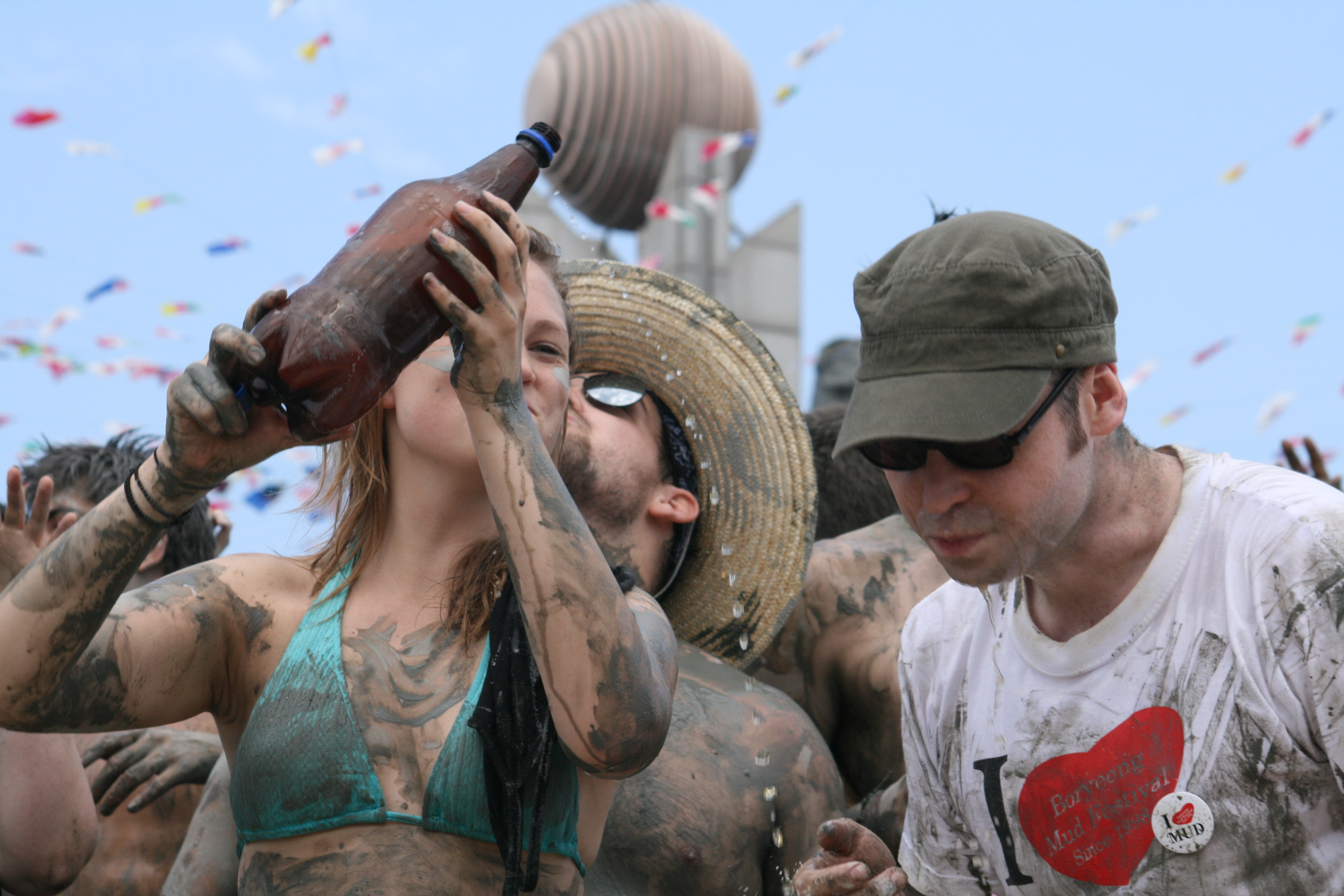

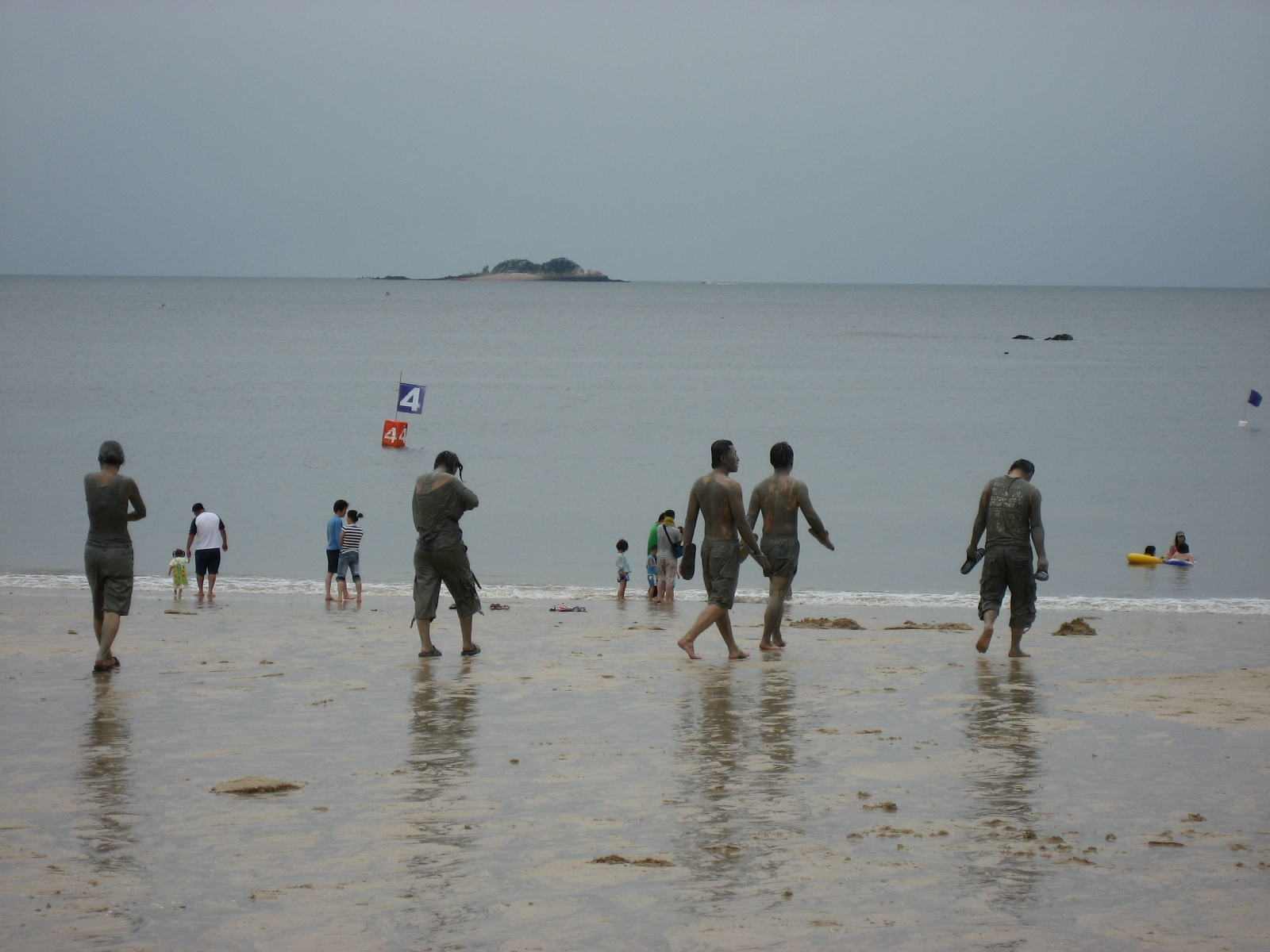

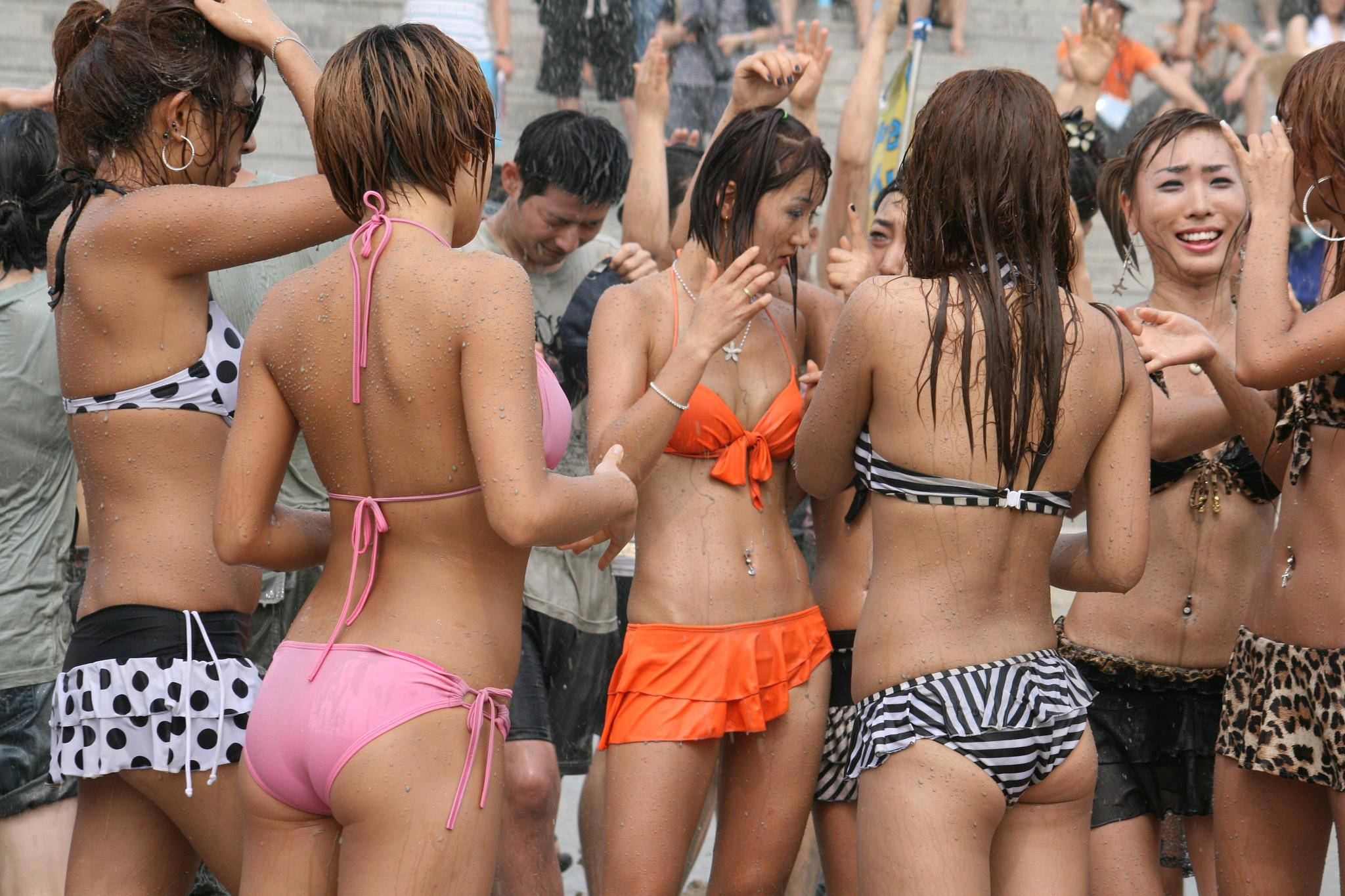
