= Sangsu-dong =

- Country: South Korea

Area
  - Total: 1.10 km^{2} (0.42 sq mi)

Population (2001)
  - Total: 14,705
  - Density: 13,400/km^{2} (34,600/sq mi)

Korean name
- Hangul: 상수동
- Hanja: 上水洞
- RR: Sangsu-dong
- MR: Sangsu-dong

Sangsu-dong (Korean: 상수동) is a legal dong (neighbourhood) of Mapo District, Seoul, South Korea and was merged with Changjeon-dong into Seogang-dong in January 2007.

== Transport ==
The area is served by subway via Hongik University station and Sangsu station. Also, various Seoul bus lines reach the street.

== See also ==
- Administrative divisions of South Korea
