= Hongdae =

Hongdae may refer to:

- Hongik University, colloquially Hongdae, in Seoul, South Korea
- Hongdae (area), an area of Seoul named after the university
