= Gwangheungchang station =

Train station in South Korea

광흥창 (서강); Gwangheungchang (Seogang)
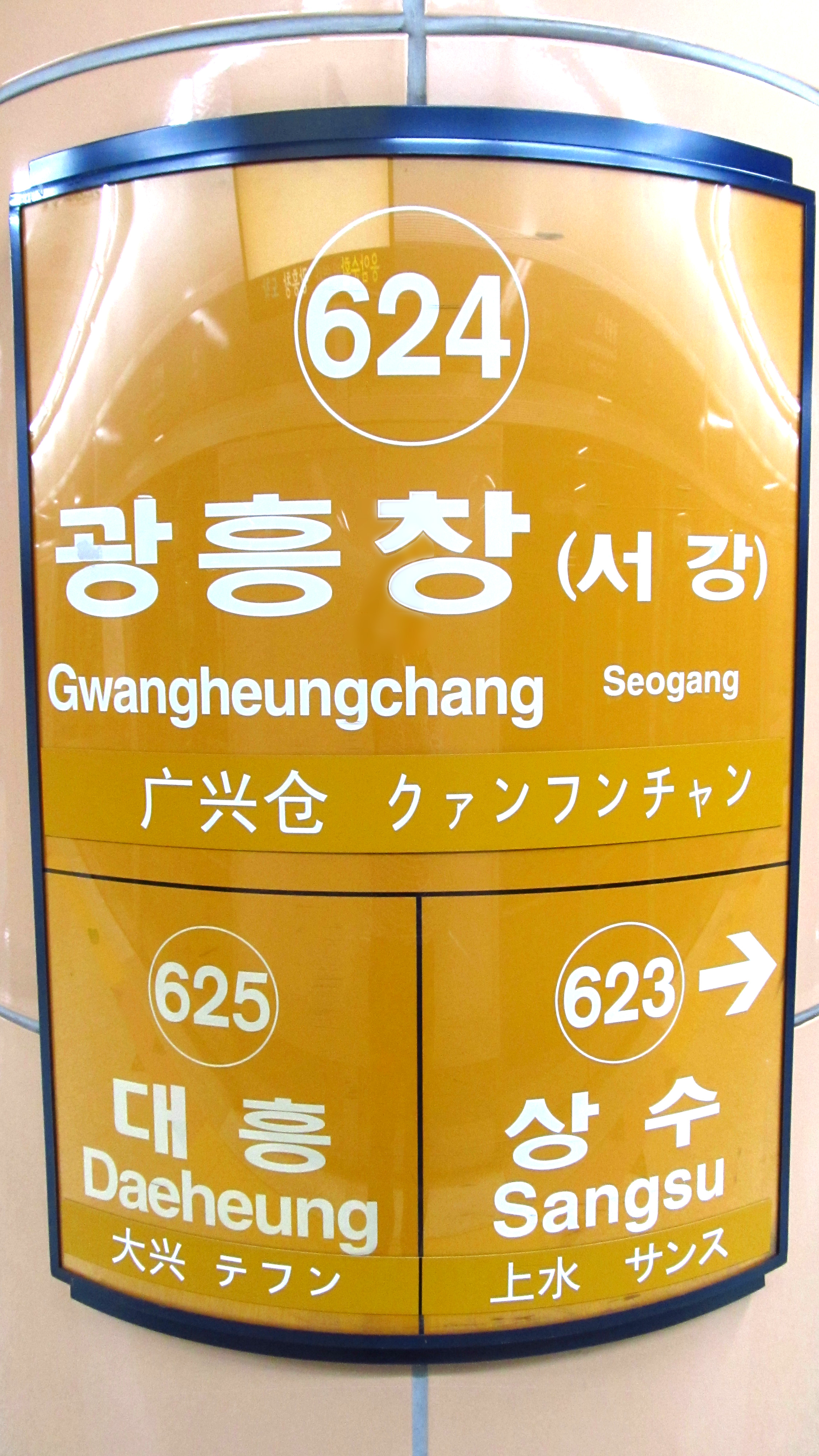

Korean name
- Hangul: 광흥창역
- Hanja: 廣興倉驛
- Revised Romanization: Gwangheungchang-yeok
- McCune–Reischauer: Kwanghŭngch'ang-yŏk

General information
- Location: 165 Dongmak-ro Jiha, 145-17 Changjeon-dong, Mapo-gu, Seoul
- Coordinates: 37°32′51″N 126°55′55″E
- Operator: Seoul Metro
- Line: Line 6
- Platforms: 1
- Tracks: 2

Construction
- Structure type: Underground

Key dates
- December 15, 2000: Line 6 opened
Location

Gwangheungchang Station is a subway station on Seoul Subway Line 6 in Mapo District, Seoul. It is located close to the northern end of Seogang Bridge, which links Sinchon and Yeouido. Bamseom, located under the bridge on the Han River, is visible from here.

== Station layout ==
G	Street level	Exit

L1; Concourse	Lobby	Customer Service, Shops, Vending machines, ATMs

L2; Platform level	Westbound	← Line 6 toward Eungam (Sangsu)
L2; Platform level	Island platform, doors will open on the left
L2; Platform level	Eastbound	Line 6 toward Sinnae (Daeheung) →

== Gallery ==
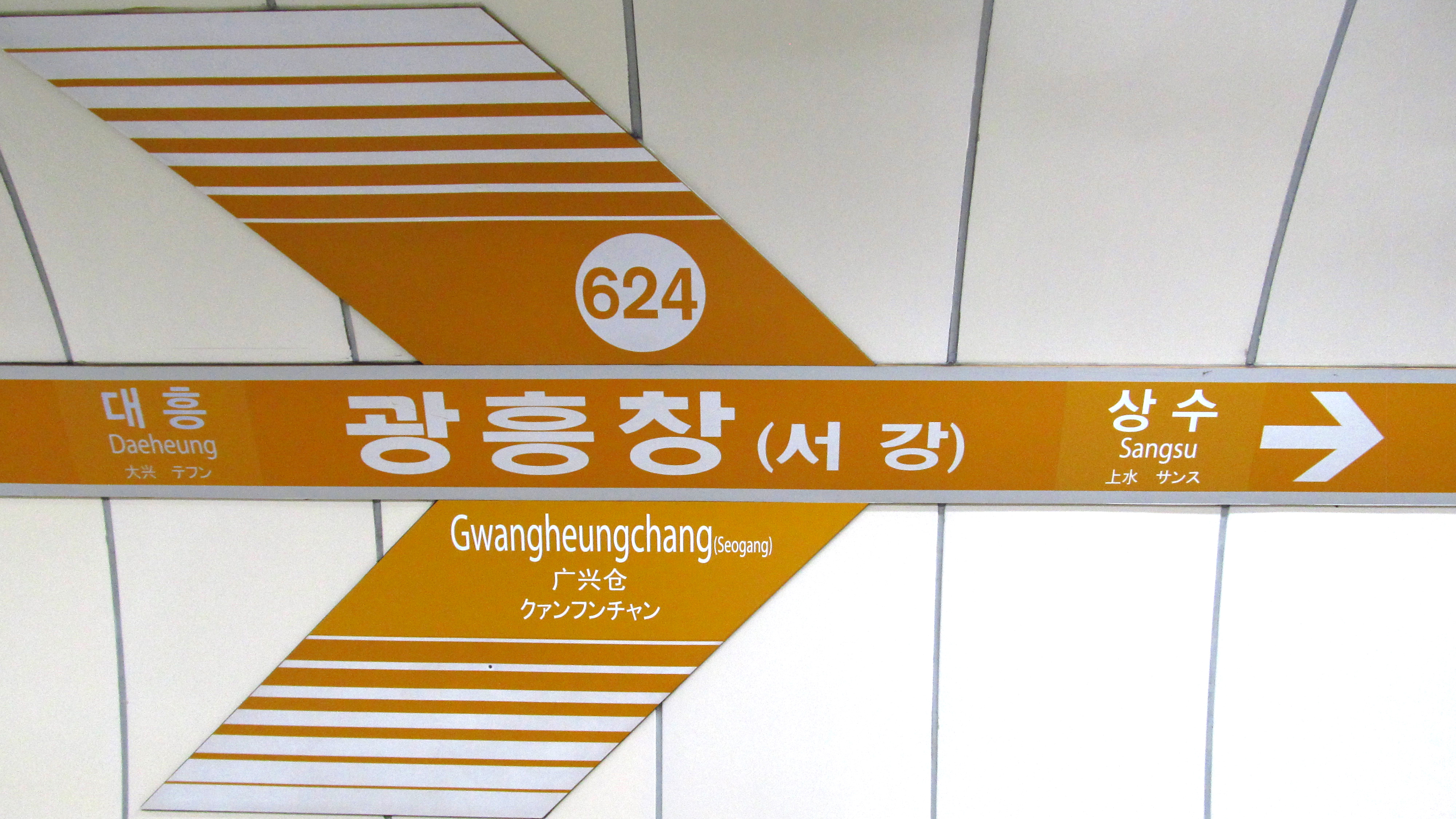
Station sign

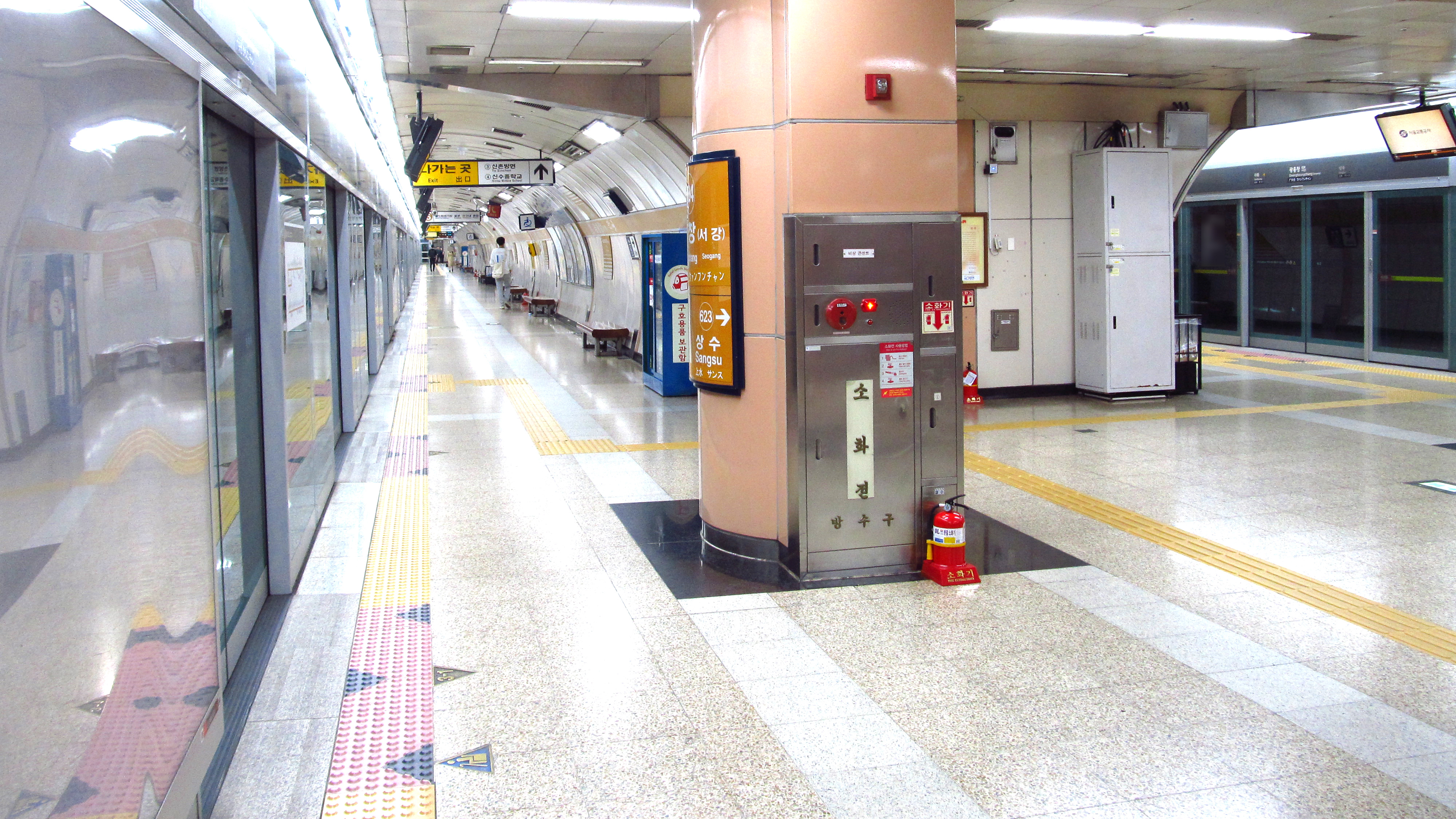
Station tube-style platform

Preceding station	Seoul Metropolitan Subway	Following station
Sangsu towards Eungam	Line 6	Daeheung towards Sinnae
