= Daeheung station =

Train station in South Korea

대흥 (서강대앞); Daeheung (Sogang Univ.)
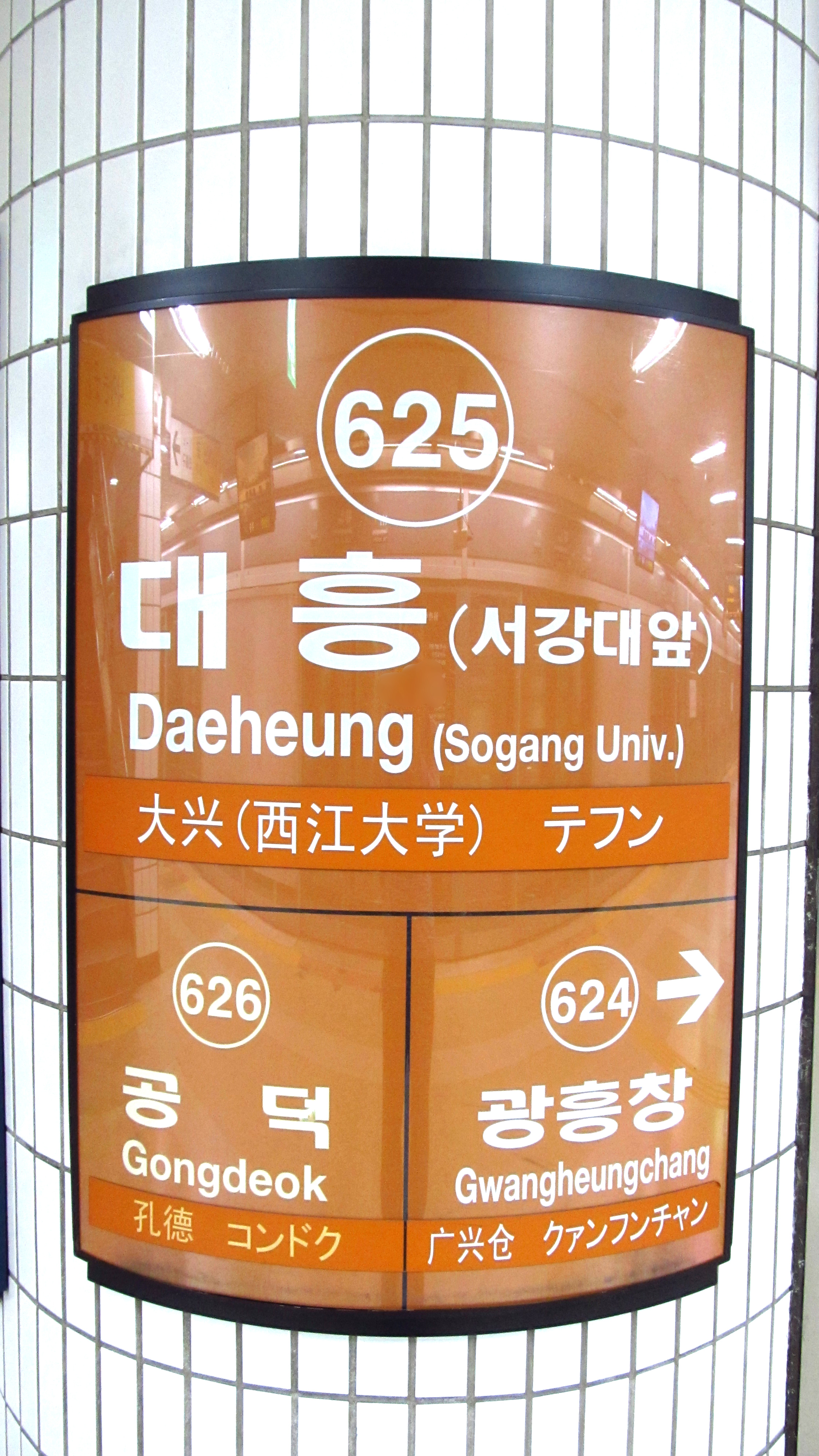

Korean name
- Hangul: 대흥역
- Hanja: 大興驛
- Revised Romanization: Daeheung-yeok
- McCune–Reischauer: Taehŭng-yŏk

General information
- Location: 267 Daeheung-dong, Mapo-gu, Seoul
- Coordinates: 37°32′52″N 126°56′32″E
- Operator: Seoul Metro
- Line: Line 6
- Platforms: 1
- Tracks: 2

Construction
- Structure type: Underground

Key dates
- December 15, 2000: Line 6 opened
Location

Daeheung station is a subway station on Seoul Subway Line 6 in Seoul, South Korea.

== Station layout ==
G	Street level	Exit

L1; Concourse	Lobby	Customer service, shops, vending machines, ATMs

L2; Platform level	Westbound	← Line 6 toward Eungam (Gwangheungchang)
L2; Platform level	Island platform, doors will open on the left
L2; Platform level	Eastbound	Line 6 toward Sinnae (Gongdeok) →

== Vicinity ==
- Exit 1 : Sogang University
- Exit 2 : Yonggang Elementary School, Sungmun Middle & High Schools
- Exit 3 : Taeyeong APT
- Exit 4 : Sinseok Elementary School

== Gallery ==
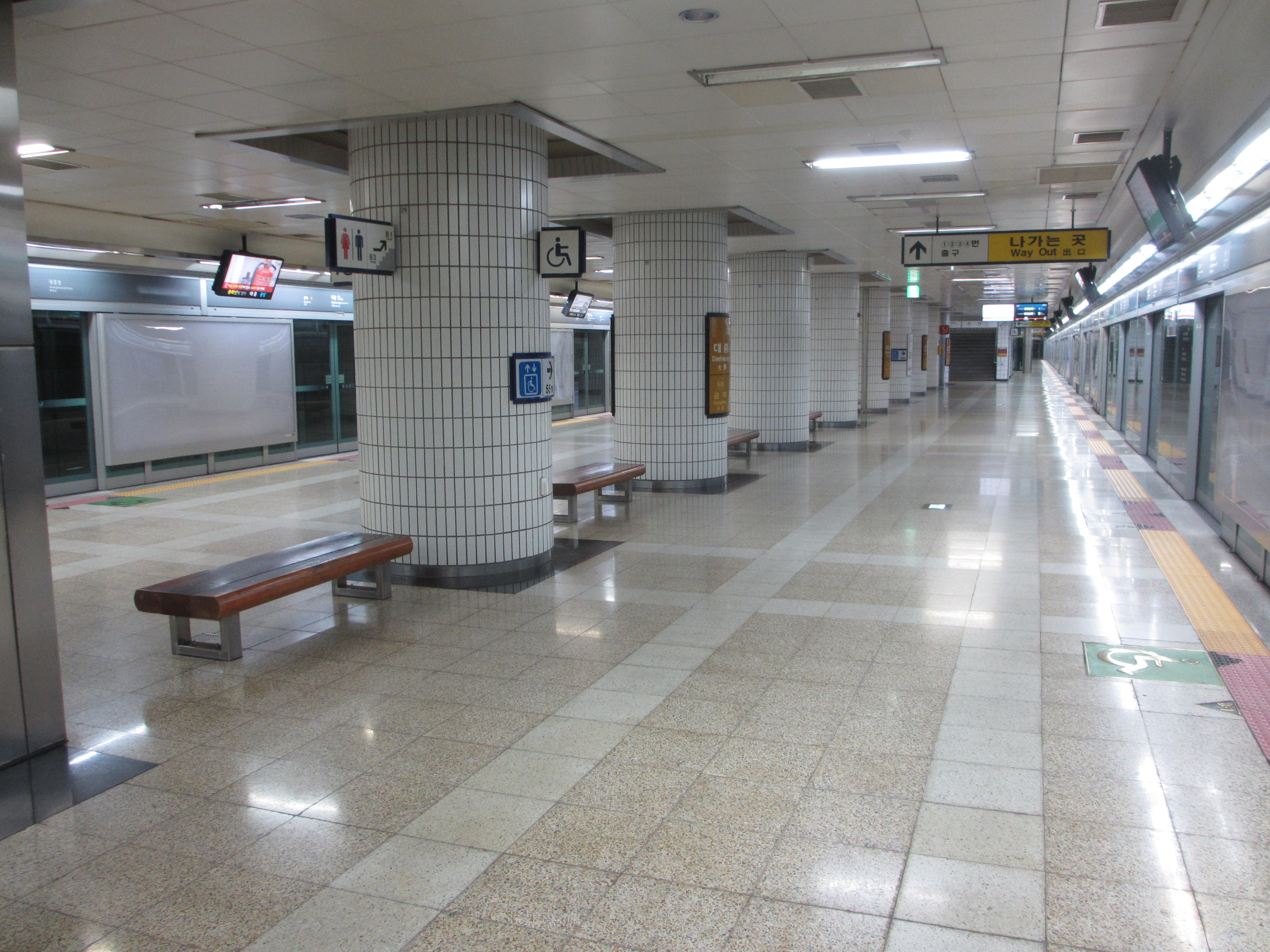
Daeheung station, 2013

Preceding station	Seoul Metropolitan Subway	Following station
Gwangheungchang towards Eungam	Line 6	Gongdeok towards Sinnae
