= Hongdae guy =

Internet meme

The Hongdae guy is an internet meme referring to South Korean men who approach, bother, and harass tourist women in the Hongdae neighborhood of Seoul. While popularized as a meme in 2025, The Korea Herald reported that "Many foreigners here say they have encountered a version of him in real life" and that the archetype has existed in Hongdae, and other parts of Seoul, for years.

== History ==
The Hongdae guy meme first became popularized in 2025 by Sean Solo, a content creator who records staged, parody videos of himself, often dressed up in a black leather jacket, as he approaches foreign women and asks them "Are you open-minded?" and "Do you live alone?" However, many publications have reported that the archetype of the Hongdae guy has existed in South Korean nightlife for many years.

In November 2025, The Korea Herald wrote a piece examining the Hongdae guy phenomenon, asking many foreigners if the meme matched the reality of being a foreign woman in South Korean nightlife. Some laughed and shared their experiences encountering them, while others discussed a pattern of sketchy, unsafe behavior from them, such as an incident where a Taiwanese YouTuber was attacked by "a group of men she said fit the 'Hongdae guy' stereotype."

Similarly, The Chosun Daily wrote that Hongdae guys, as well as guys in other areas like Itaewon, were creating "unpleasant experiences" for foreign women and could potentially "become a toxin that tarnishes Korea’s image." Joanna Elfving-Hwang, in The Conversation, wrote that "While Hongdae guys are by no means representative of all Korean men... the fact these men exist, and have become a recognisable part of Hongdae’s nightlife, speaks to serious broader issues of misogyny and gendered thinking."
