= Sangsu station =

Train station in South Korea

상수; Sangsu
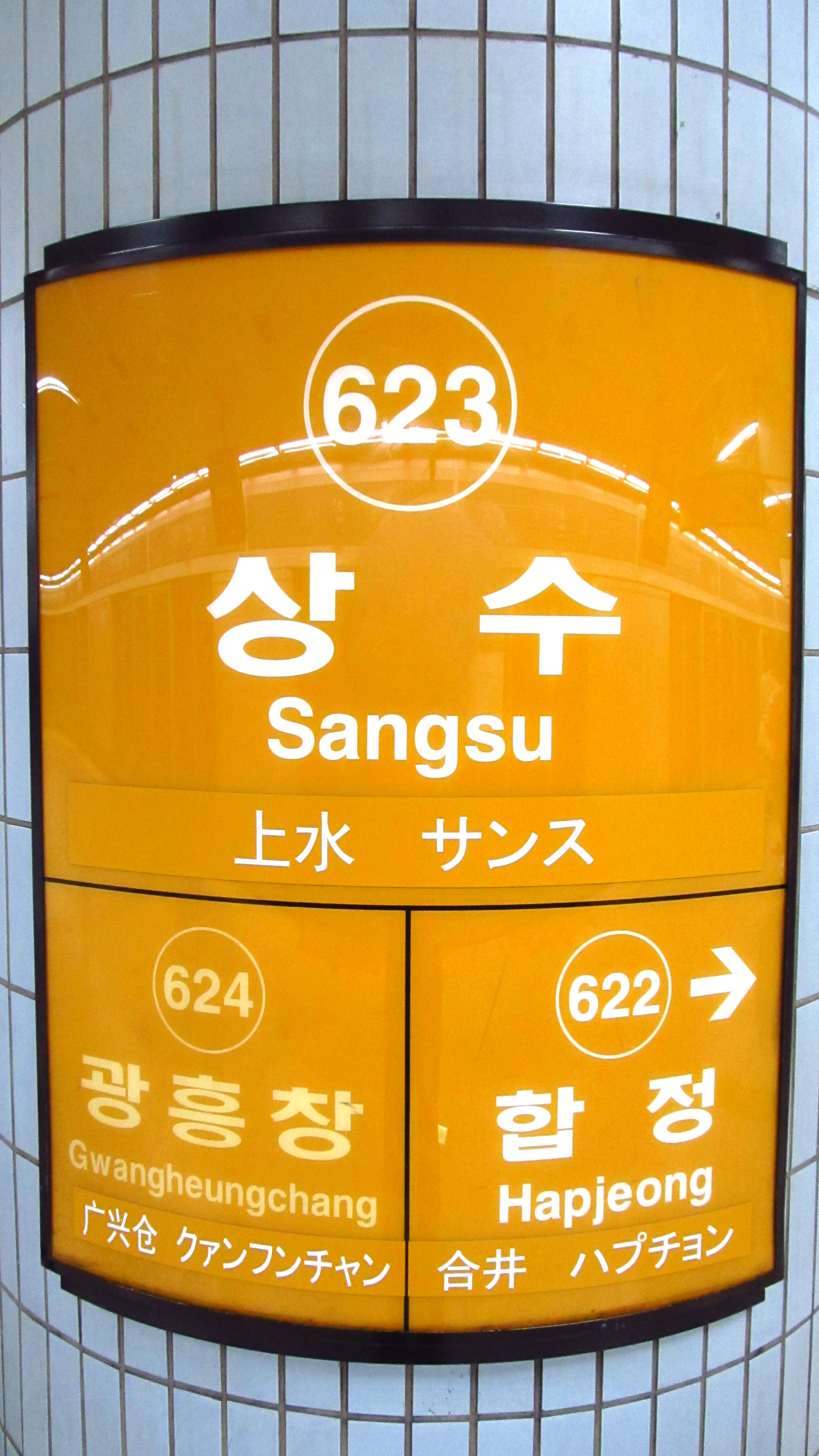

Korean name
- Hangul: 상수역
- Hanja: 上水驛
- Revised Romanization: Sangsu-yeok
- McCune–Reischauer: Sangsu-yŏk

General information
- Location: 85 Dongmak-ro Jiha, 309-10 Sangsu-dong, Mapo-gu, Seoul
- Coordinates: 37°32′52″N 126°55′21″E
- Operated by: Seoul Metro
- Line: Line 6
- Platforms: 1
- Tracks: 2

Construction
- Structure type: Underground

Key dates
- December 15, 2000: Line 6 opened
Location

Sangsu station is a subway station on Seoul Subway Line 6. Along with Hongik University station on Line 2, it serves the area commonly called Hongdae, albeit geographically less convenient. The name of the subway station comes from its local name. The local name means the top of the river.

== Station layout ==
G	Street level	Exit

L1; Concourse	Lobby	Customer service, shops, vending machines, ATMs

L2; Platform level	Westbound	← Line 6 toward Eungam (Hapjeong)
L2; Platform level	Island platform, doors will open on the left
L2; Platform level	Eastbound	Line 6 toward Sinnae (Gwangheungchang) →

Preceding station	Seoul Metropolitan Subway	Following station
Hapjeong towards Eungam	Line 6	Gwangheungchang towards Sinnae
