= Hongdae (area) =

Neighborhood in Seoul, South Korea

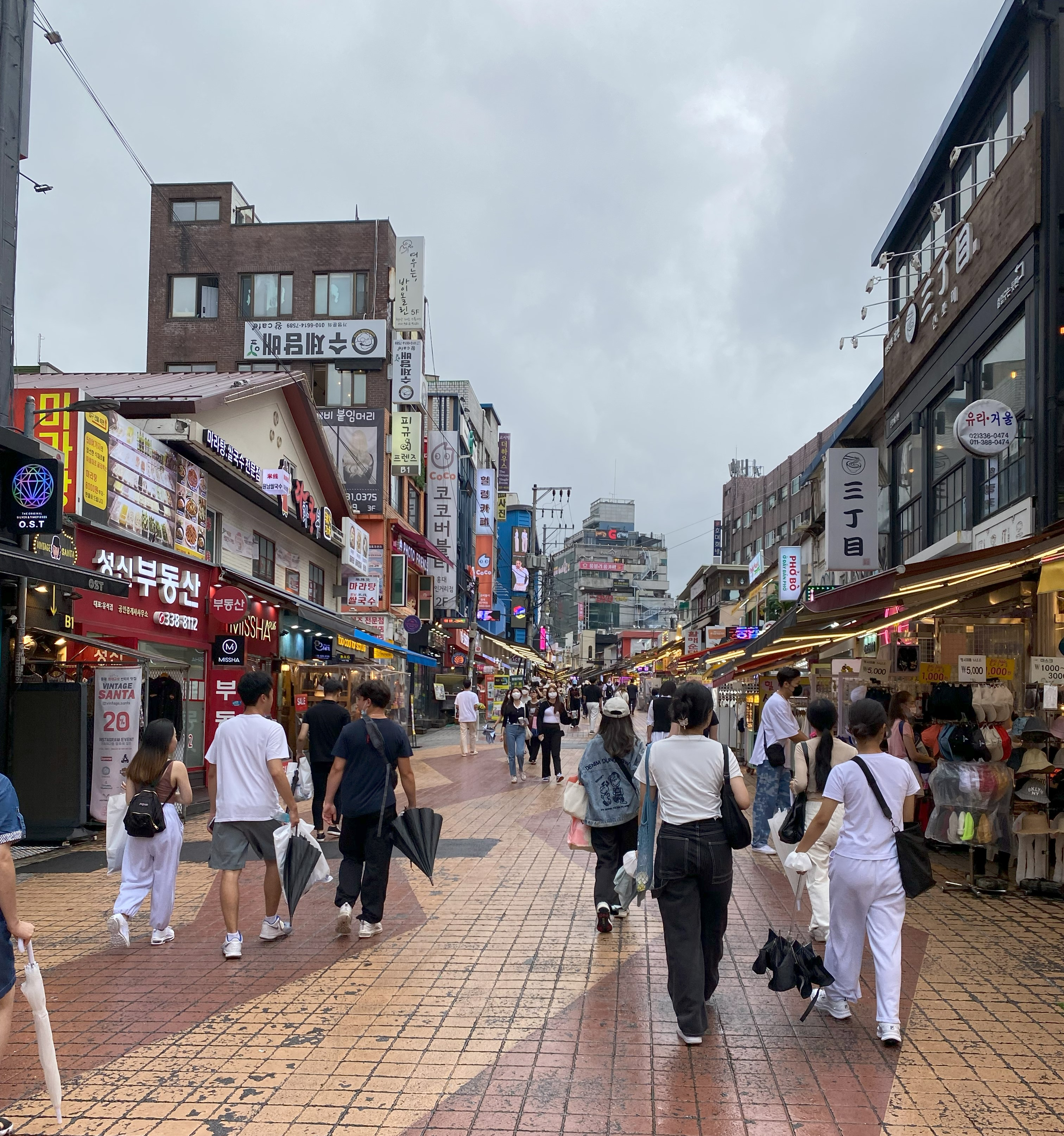
- Hongdae Street

- Location within Seoul
- Coordinates: 37°33′19″N 126°55′24″E
- Country: South Korea
- City: Seoul
- District: Mapo District

Korean name
- Hangul: 홍대
- Hanja: 弘大
- RR: Hongdae
- MR: Hongdae

Hongdae (Korean: 홍대) is a neighborhood in Mapo District, Seoul, South Korea, near Hongik University ("Hongik Daehakgyo" in Korean), after which it is named. The neighborhood is known for its urban arts and indie music culture, local shops, clubs, cafés and entertainment. The area is located in Mapo District in the western end of Seoul, stretching from Seogyo-dong, Hapjeong-dong & Seogang-dong.

== Characteristics ==
The Hongdae area grew under the influence of Hongik University (Hongdae), a prestigious private university known for its Fine Arts Program, attracting people in the arts from the 1990s. Early on, thanks to then-cheap rent, budget musicians and street artists started moving into the ateliers of the Hongdae area. Korea's indie music scene started from two bands launched in the area, Sister's Barbershop and Crying Nut in the mid-1990s. Before that many cover bands played near Sinchon and Idea. Later, other bands like Jaurim, Peppertones and Idiotape started to play at venues in Hongdae, and the area began to cultivate a reputation as the mecca of urban arts and underground club culture. Hongdae now provides street art festivals and performances, as well as music concerts by independent artists and mainstream entertainers.

Many people come to Hongdae for its aesthetically unique characteristics. There are many graffiti murals painted all over the streets of Hongdae. One of the well known areas for these murals is Hongdae Mural Street (also known as 'Picasso's Street').

Like other multi-cultural metropolitan areas, this street is undergoing gentrification. However, despite the recent explosion of upmarket brand shops that pushes artists to move toward the southern area near Hapjeong Station, the street still enjoys a reputation as the city's prime spot for indie musicians. Many live music venues and festivals draw revelers from a wide range of visitors. YG Entertainment, the major K-pop agency is also located near the street.

Hongdae is also the origin of the Hongdae guy phenomenon, which became a meme in 2025, about certain types of men who loiter around Hongdae to flirt with foreign women.

== Culture ==
Hongdae has become an area known for its diverse and indie oriented art culture, including independent clothing stalls, vintage shops, art studios, trendy cafés and clubs. Additionally it has also become home to dancers, musicians and even aspiring independent K-Pop groups who perform as Buskers or Street Performers. Busking helps performers improve their skills, get exposure and even make a little money from their performances. In 2016, Hongdae was ranked as one of the coolest neighborhoods in the world.

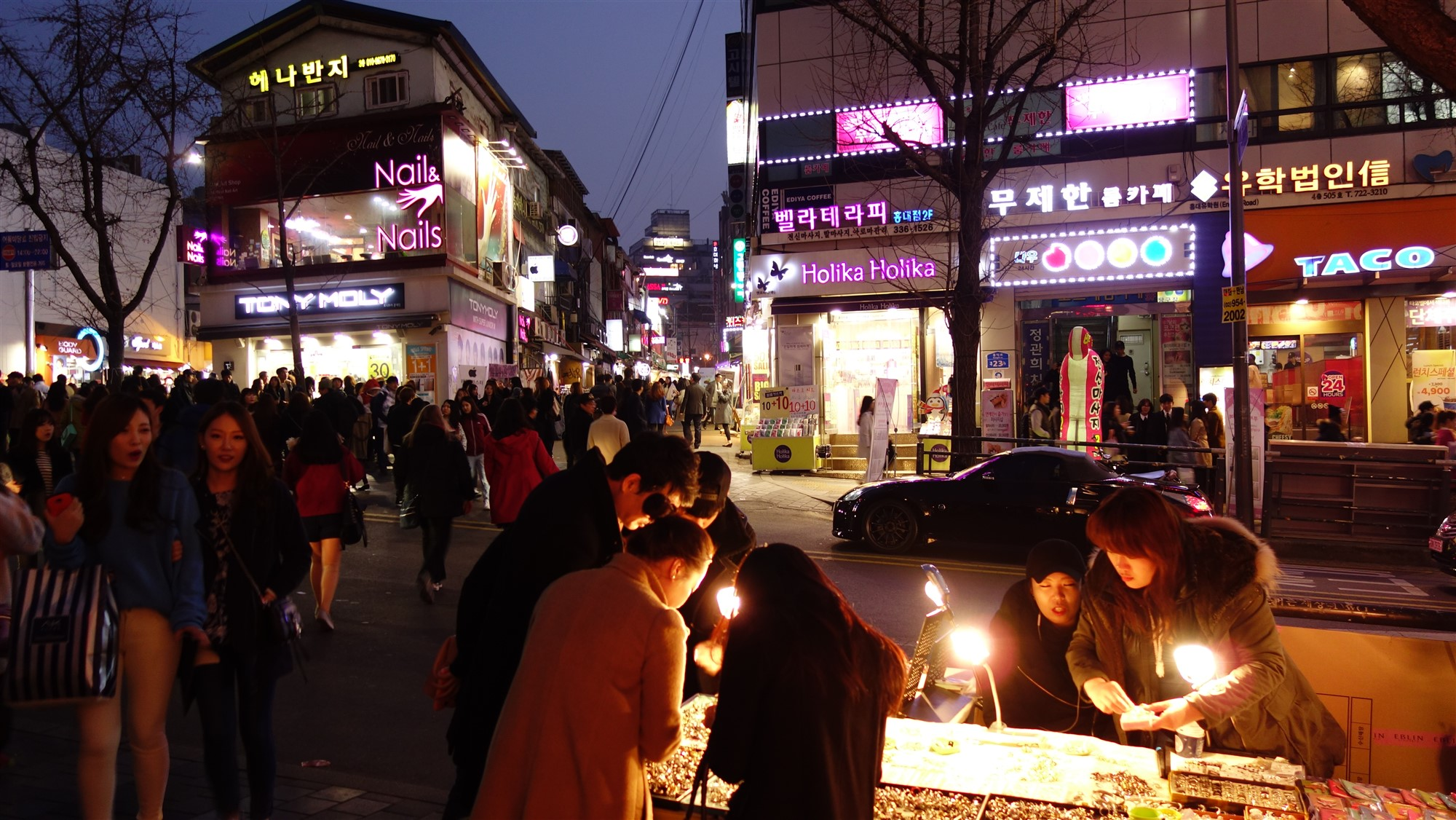
Hongdae at night (2014)

=== Clubbing ===
Hongdae is also known colloquially as one of the top places to go clubbing in Seoul. The Hongdae clubbing scene can be traced back to the 1990s and originated from studio cafés and bars in the late 1980s; it has since evolved into a diverse culture of its own. Clubs have become an important place for people to gather and share music, dance, as well as to communicate with one another. These clubs have also created a space for numerous aspiring DJs and musicians to perform in as well as provide a wide range of music genres for visitors to enjoy such as dance, techno, rock and hip-hop. Though many clubs are open to anyone over 19 years of age, there are some clubs who still strictly enforce unwritten rules such as dress codes and banning of foreigners.

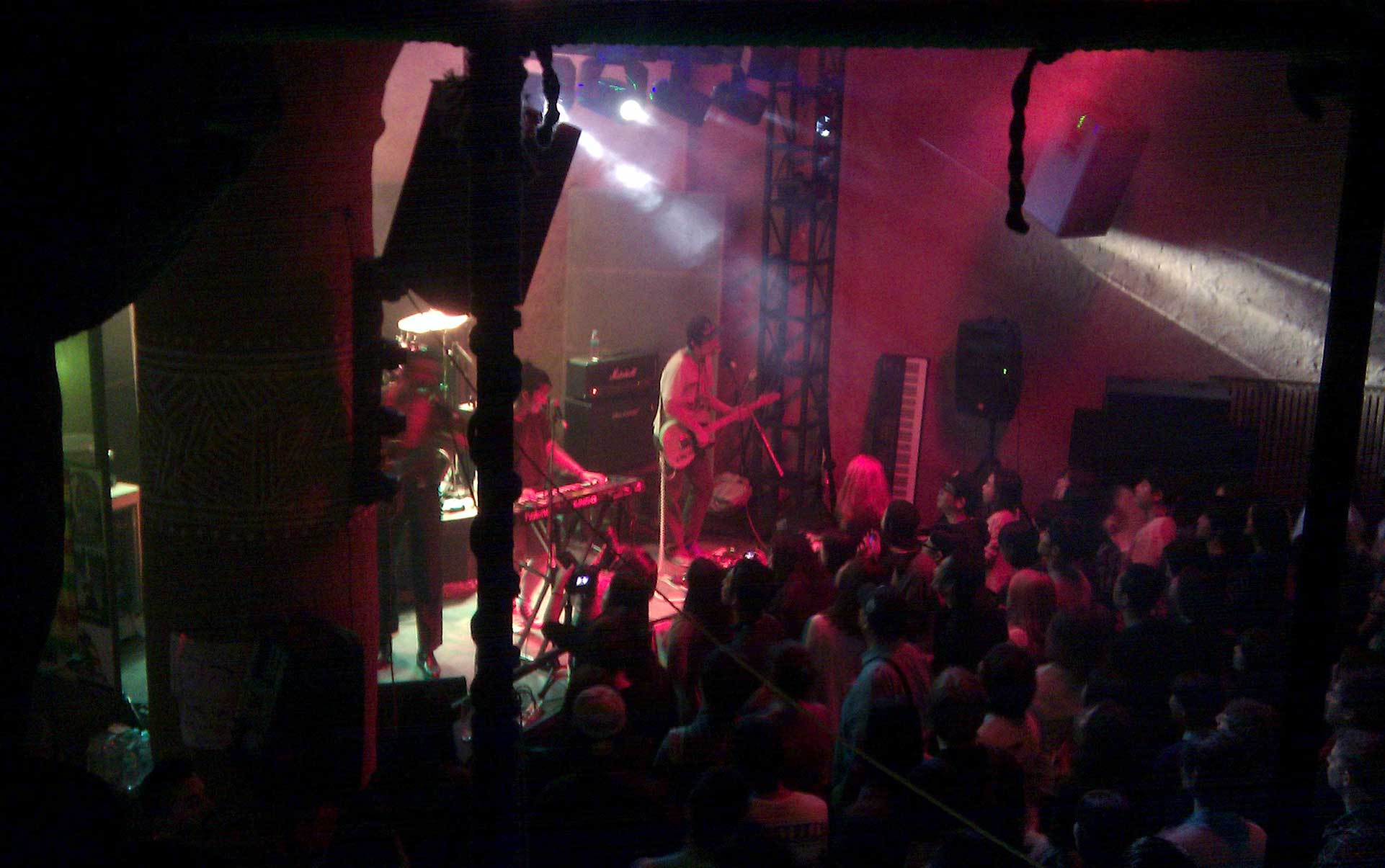
An indie band playing at a local club

=== Cafés ===
In the late 1990s this artistic culture extended into the creation of trendy cafés, which have now evolved into the famous themed café culture known to be found in Korea today. Some popular cafés include the 943 King's Cross Café, which is Harry Potter themed, animal cafes, where patrons can visit and play with various animals such as cats, dogs, and even sheep. Character cafés are also quite common and include characters such as Sanrio's Cinnamoroll as well as Line Friends cafés and Kakao Friends cafés.

=== Street Food ===
Hongdae is also home to many street foods and food vendors. Foods offered range from tteokbokki and rice cake skewers to hotteok and tanghulu, or skewers of sugar coated fruit.

=== Beauty Shopping ===
Hongdae has become a popular destination for younger shoppers and foreign tourists seeking out Korean beauty products. Major K-beauty brands present in the area include Innisfree, The Face Shop, Etude House, and Tony Moly. Olive Young, a popular Korean cosmetics retailer, has opened a second flagship store there in 2024 that caters to foreign tourists.

== Tourism ==
Hongdae's cultural attractions and nightlife, along with its location on the AREX line to Incheon International Airport, have made it a popular destination for foreign tourists in recent decades. Although the area had only a single small hotel for many years, Hongdae now has numerous boutique hotels and low-cost guesthouses targeted towards foreign backpackers.

A handful of halal restaurants, serving Middle Eastern, Indian, and Indonesian cuisine exist in the area to serve the increasing numbers of visitors and students from Muslim Southeast Asia.

Gyeongui Forest Line Park is a linear park built on a former rail line that is popular with young visitors to Hongdae.

In recent years, part of one of Hongdae's main streets was painted red and renamed the "Red Road." The Red Road has many of Hongdae's numerous gaming arcades, restaurants, karaoke parlors, curio shops and fortune tellers. The Red Road often has large crowds of visitors and tourists.

== Events ==
=== Zandari Festa ===
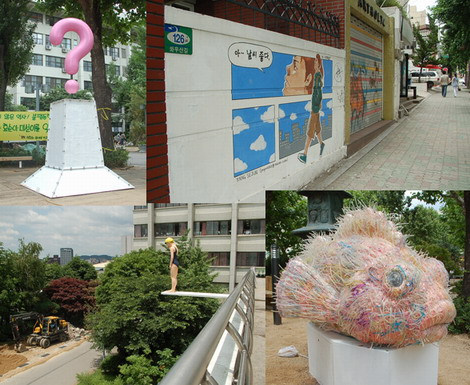
Street art exhibition

Zandari Festa is named after 'Zandari', an old name for the Hongdae area. 'Zandari' implies small bridge, and the festival's ambition is also to be a bridge between the artists and audiences around the local indie music scene. Every Fall, it is held over 3 days in the pre-scheduled hosting live clubs. The festival encourages bands to invite themselves, artists are also encouraged to take part in planning and promoting the shows they play in.

=== Live Club Day ===
Since March 2001, 'Club Day' started as a wristband-powered event which allows entry to more than a dozen clubs for the price of one. After 2007, 'Sound Day' also launched together with the indie music concert venues. During 2008 through early 2009 they were suspend due to high levels of violence and disturbances by US Army soldiers and underage individuals. They reopened again but came to close soon in January 2011 (as the 117th Club Day), mainly due to the dispute over the distribution of profits between popular live/dance clubs and other budget ones.

After a four-year break, in January 2015, six live clubs established the 'Live Club Cooperative' and with other clubs, they resumed the 'Live Club Day' on 27 February. The 'Live Club Day' is held on the last Friday of every month. The ticket system is the same as before, one can get access to multiple clubs for a variety of genres including rock, jazz, hip hop and electronic with one ticket.

=== Street Art Exhibition ===
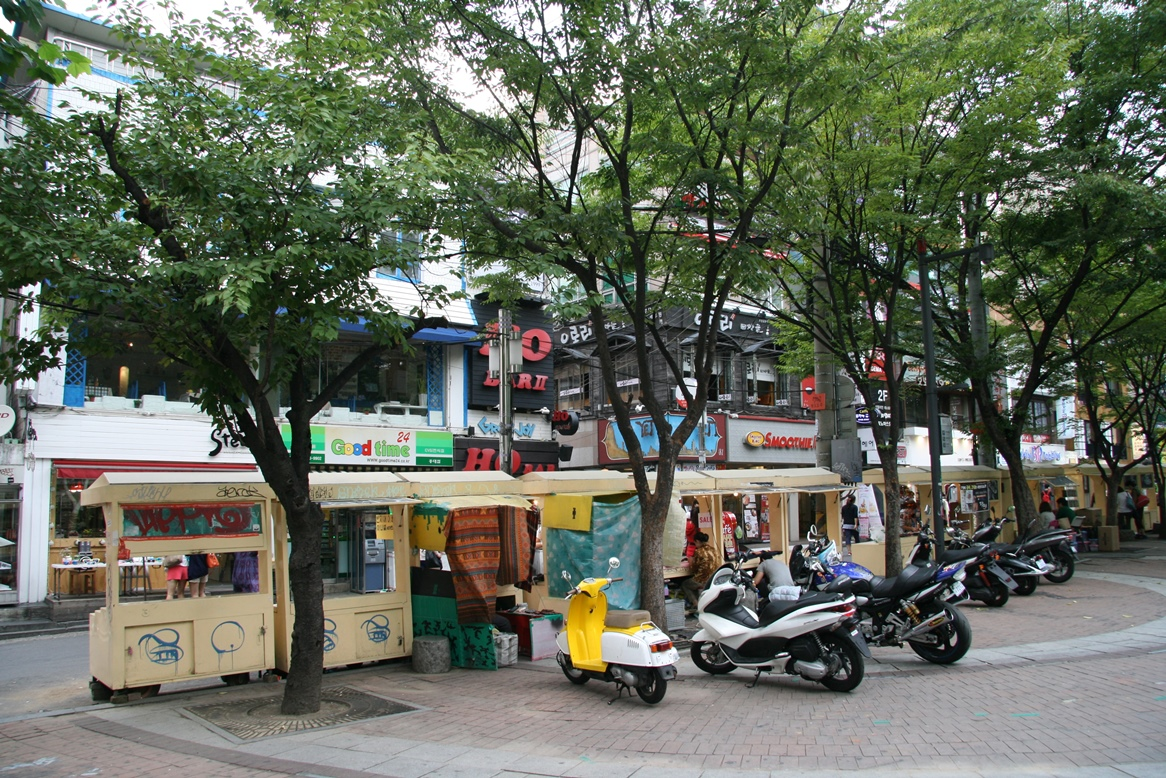
Hongdae Playground street merchants on Wausan-ro 21-gil

During early 1990s, students from the College of Fine Arts at Hongik University began to decorate the streets, walls, and roads around the college. Their efforts were soon joined by many artists from across the country and the first 'Street Art Festival' was held in 1993. Every year, students of Hongik University and neighbor artists join to produce diversity of visual arts on Hongdae streets like graffiti wall painting, installation arts and performances.

=== Free Market ===
'Hongdaeap Artmarket Freemarket' is held on 'Hongdae Playground', that is in front of the main gate of Hongik University. It holds on weekends, from March to November at 13:00 to 18:00 by the host of the nonprofit organization 'Living and Art Creative Center' (일상예술창작센터) since 2002. The flea markets are called "Free Market" on Saturdays and "Hope Market" on Sundays. They are fledgling craft markets of things made by students and street artists. Other culture markets have been influenced by this original playground Freemarket and open randomly around the Hongdae area.

== Transport ==
The area is served by subway via Hongik University station ( and), Hapjeong station ( and), and Sangsu station. Also, various Seoul bus lines reach the street, as well as the presence of many taxis.

== In popular culture ==
Hongdae area is widely used for filming location of domestic television dramas and movies, which include :

- 2007, MBC's Coffee Prince
- 2010, KBS's Mary Stayed Out All Night
- 2011, tvN's Flower Boy Ramyun Shop.
- 2012, SBS's A Gentleman's Dignity.
- 2015, Belgian singer-songwriter Sioen made a song named "Hongdae".
- 2017, Mnet's reality show Fromis's Room
- 2018, JTBC's reality show Blackpink House
- 2021, 1theK's reality show Learn Way season 2, Episode 9

== Gallery ==
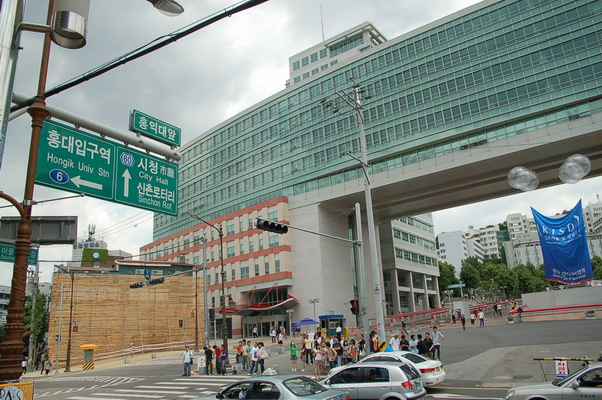
Main gate of the Hongik University

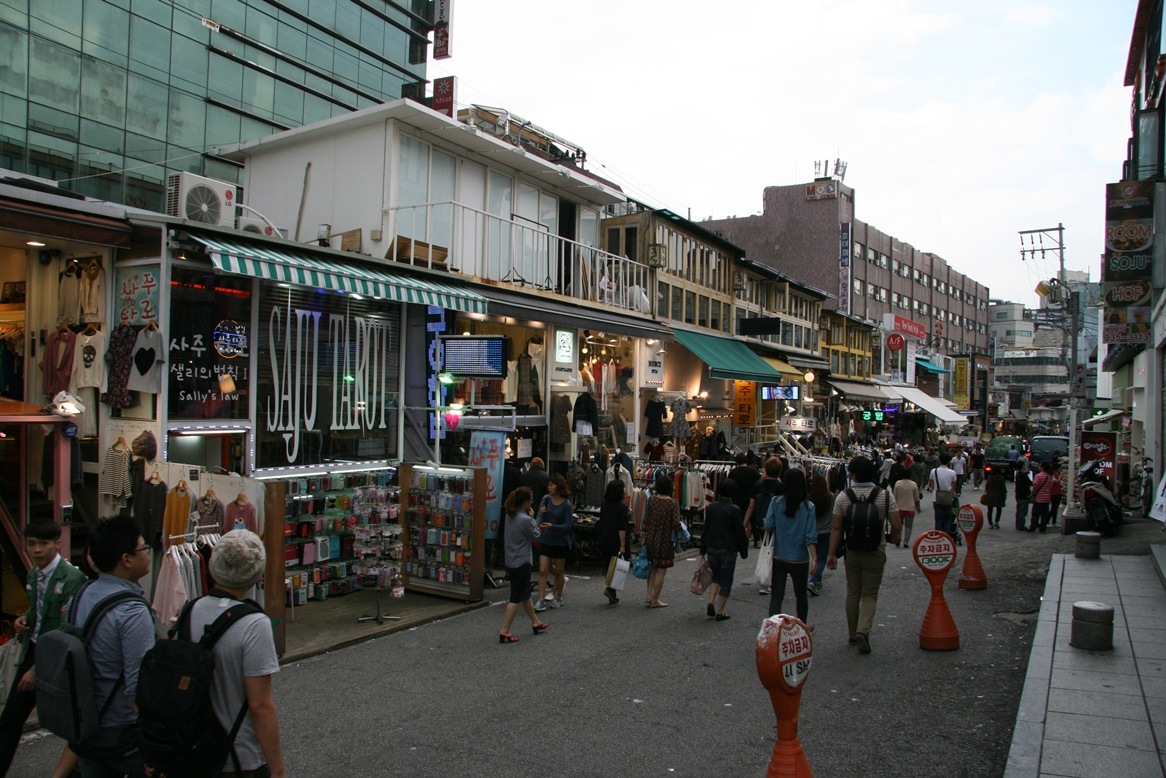
Independent clothing stalls on Eoulmadang-ro

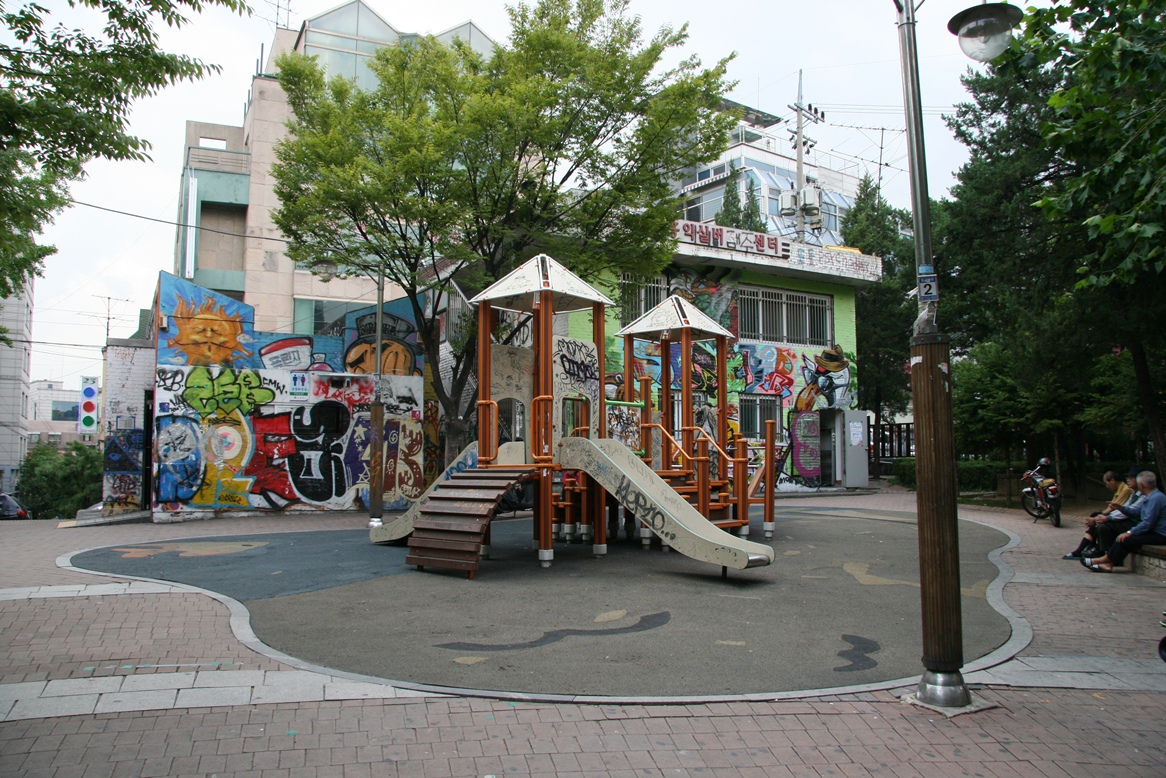
Playground in the area (2012)

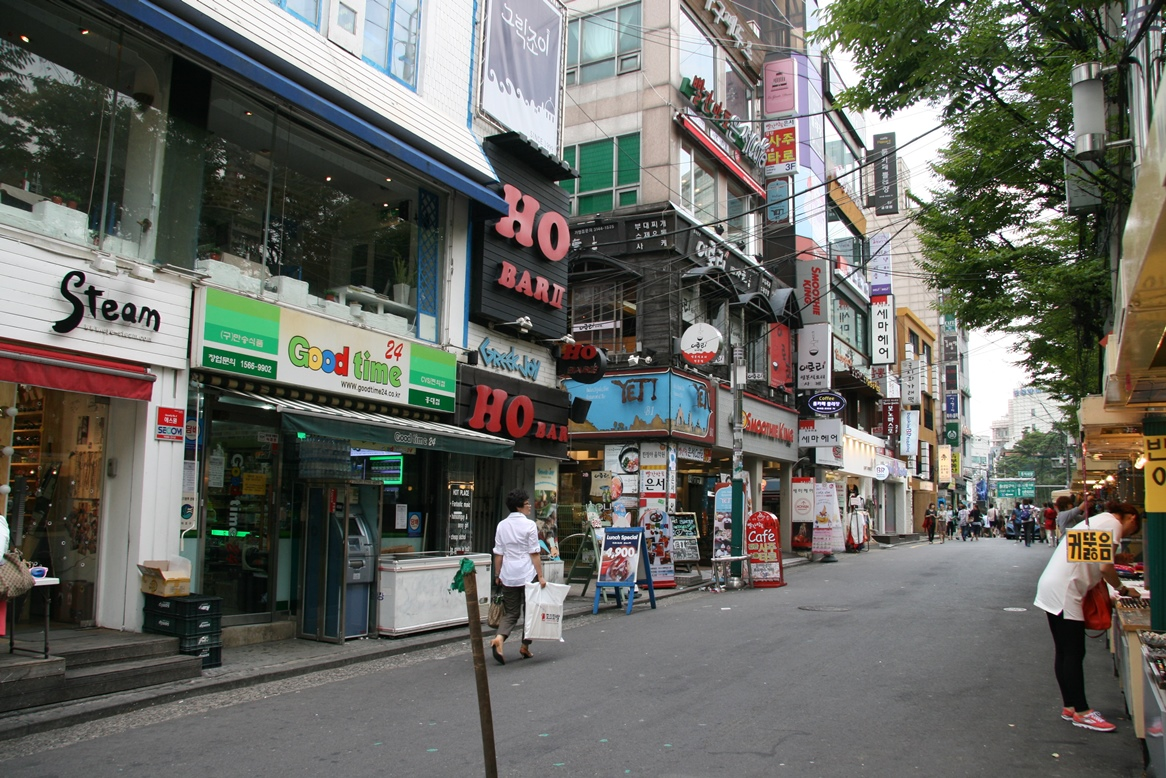
Shops on Wausan-ro 21-gil opposite Hongdae Playground

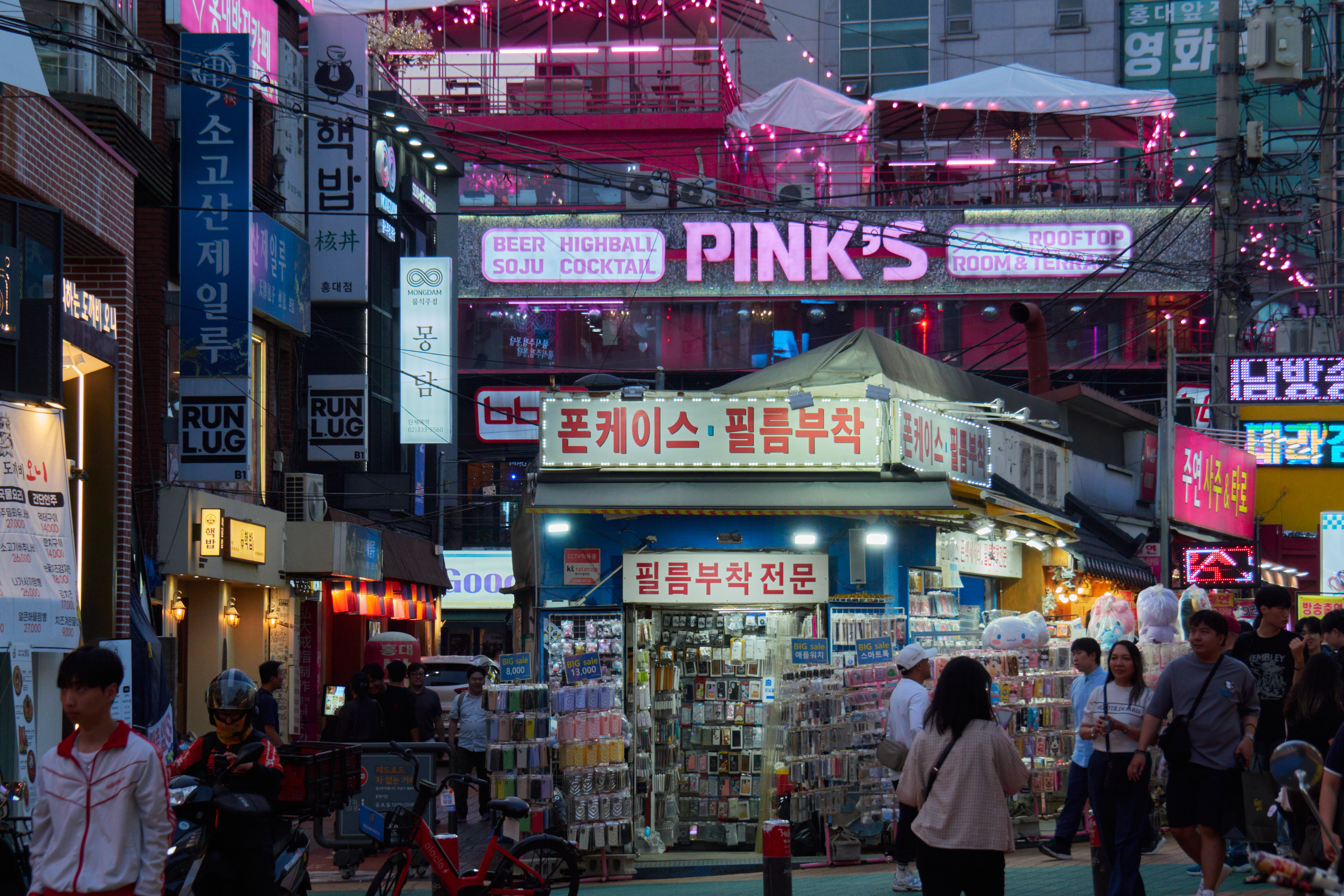
Street scene in Hongdae
