= Changjeon-dong =

Coordinates: 37.550°N 126.931°E

- Interactive map of Changjeon-dong
- Country: South Korea

Area
  - Total: 0.47 km^{2} (0.18 sq mi)

Population (2001)
  - Total: 12,527
  - Density: 27,000/km^{2} (69,000/sq mi)

Korean name
- Hangul: 창전동
- Hanja: 倉前洞
- RR: Changjeon-dong
- MR: Ch'angjŏn-dong

Changjeon-dong (Korean: 창전동) is a legal dong (neighborhood) of Mapo District, Seoul, South Korea. It was merged with Sangsu-dong into Seogang-dong in January 2007.

== See also ==
- Administrative divisions of South Korea
