= Seogang-dong =

- Interactive map of Seogang-dong
- Coordinates: 37°32′49″N 126°55′32″E
- Country: South Korea

Area
  - Total: 1.47 km^{2} (0.57 sq mi)

Population
  - Total: 25,697
  - Density: 17,500/km^{2} (45,300/sq mi)

Korean name
- Hangul: 서강동
- Hanja: 西江洞
- RR: Seogang-dong
- MR: Sŏgang-dong

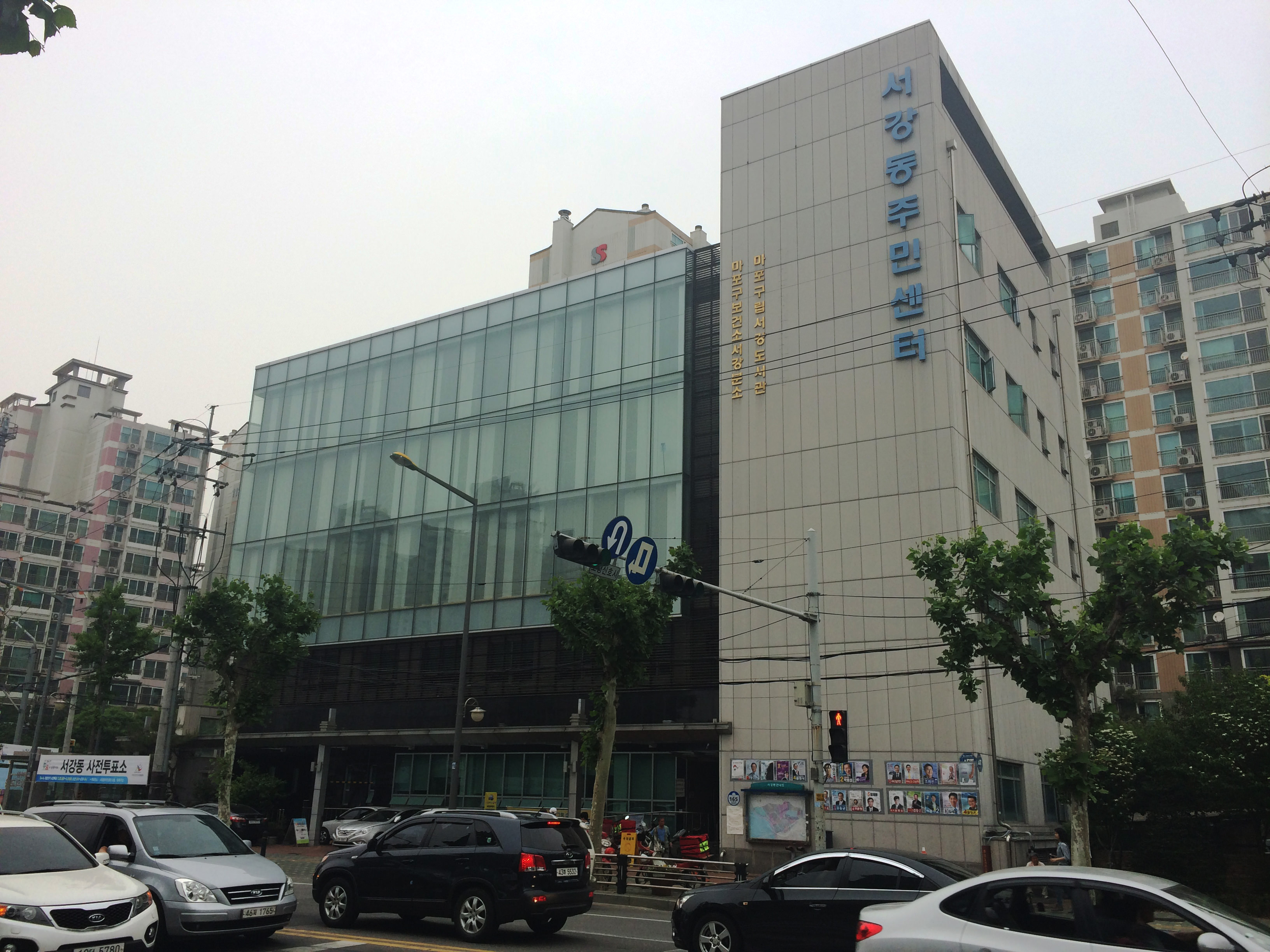
Seogang-dong Community Service Center (Mapo-gu)

Seogang-dong (Korean: 서강동) is a legal dong (neighbourhood) of Mapo District, Seoul, South Korea.

== See also ==
- Administrative divisions of South Korea
