= The Koreans =

The Koreans may refer to:

- The Koreans (band) - an indie rock band from South London
- The Koreans (book) - a non-fiction piece of literature by Michael Breen
