= Pizza in North Korea =

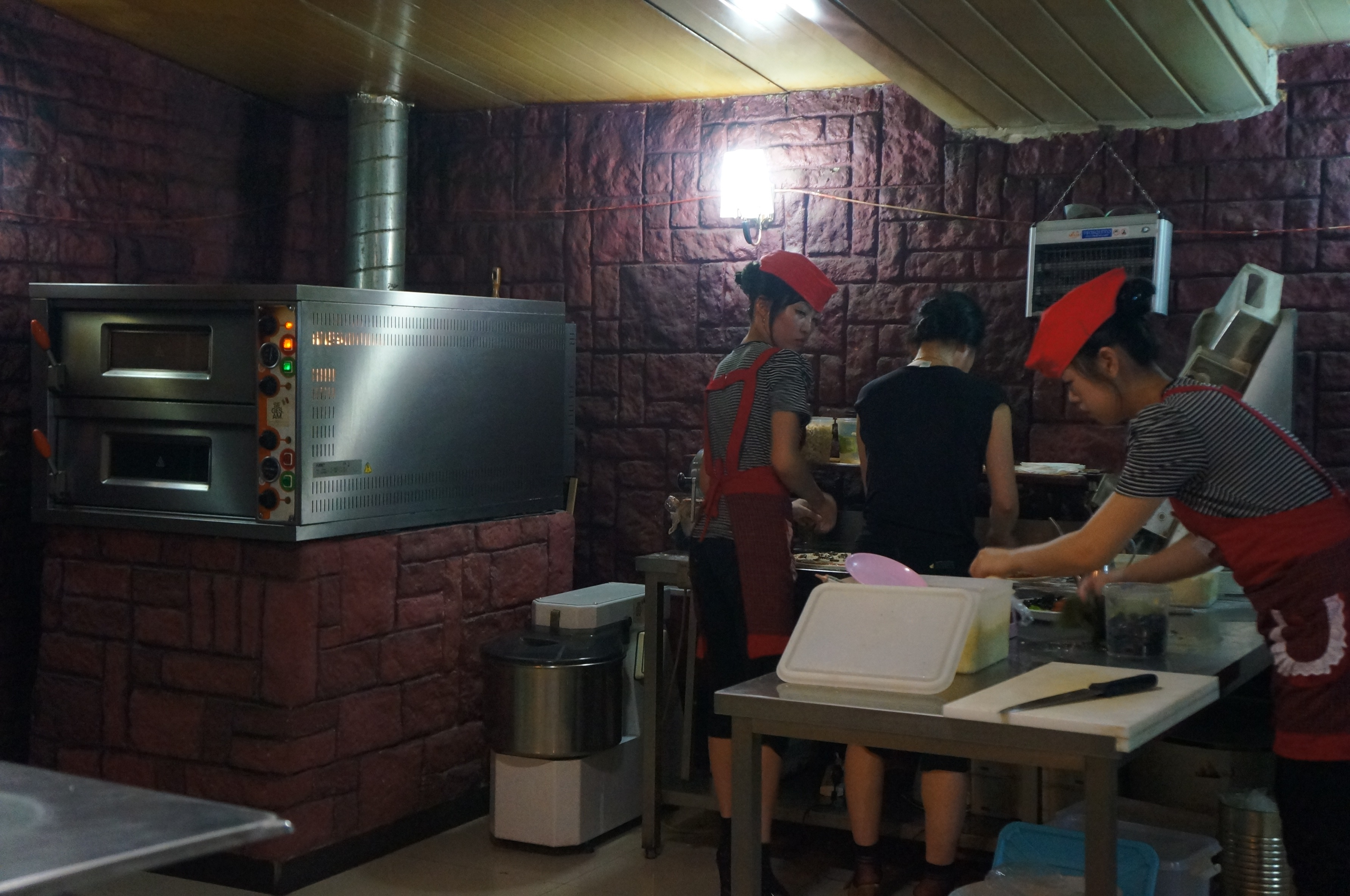
A restaurant in Pyongyang preparing pizza in 2013

North Korea has several restaurants serving pizza. (Note: Written in Hangul as 삐짜, rather than the South Korean spelling of 피자.) Most people in the country cannot afford pizza, and it is mostly available for the elite. Pyongyang has five restaurants that serve pizza, including Pizza Restaurant on Kwangbok Street and Italy Pizza on Mirae Scientists Street. Kim Jong Il hired Italian chefs to train North Koreans in pizza making and introduced it to the country.

== History ==
North Korean leader Kim Jong Il, who was noted for his lavish culinary habits, made efforts to introduce international cuisine in the 1990s. In the spring of 1997, he had pizzaiolo Ermanno Furlanis flown into Pyongyang, along with another Italian chef and both of their wives, to train North Korean chefs in pizza-making for three weeks. The Italian chefs brought two pizza ovens, which were allegedly intercepted by CIA agents at the Berlin airport.

Furlanis described his experience in a three-part series for Asia Times Online in August 2001. He wrote that he was subjected to an extensive medical examination and tests of his cooking skill before he could begin instruction, and noted that his pupils measured the distance between olives. "I could not explain the concept of creativity", he noted.

All day I was only expected to prepare 10 or 20 pizzas, and this usually took me no more than a couple of hours. My pupils gravely noted down the most trivial details and gradually began doing much of the work themselves, picking up my techniques with amazing rapidity.

— Ermanno Furlanis

=== Pizza Restaurant ===
In 2008, North Korean chefs were sent to Naples and Rome for training in Italian pizza and pasta. Kim did not authorize the opening of the country's first pizzeria until December 2008, after chefs had mastered pizza preparation with "repeated trial and error", as reported by Choson Sinbo, a North Korea-aligned newspaper published in Japan.

The restaurant, called Pizza Restaurant, (Note: Also known as Italian Restaurant.) opened on Kwangbok Street. Its chefs used flour, butter, and cheese that had been flown in from Italy, as well as an Italian pizza oven. Pizza Restaurant was managed by Kim Sang-Soon, who said Kim believed "the people should also be allowed access to the world's famous dishes".

According to Choson Sinbo, Pizza Restaurant was busy in the months following its opening, and provided many of its customers with their first Italian meals. Its menu in 2010 included 11 traditional pizzas, though Italian food comprised only two-fifths of the menu. The Korea Times called it "Pyongyang's best pizzeria". Lonely Planet listed it as "pretty decent".

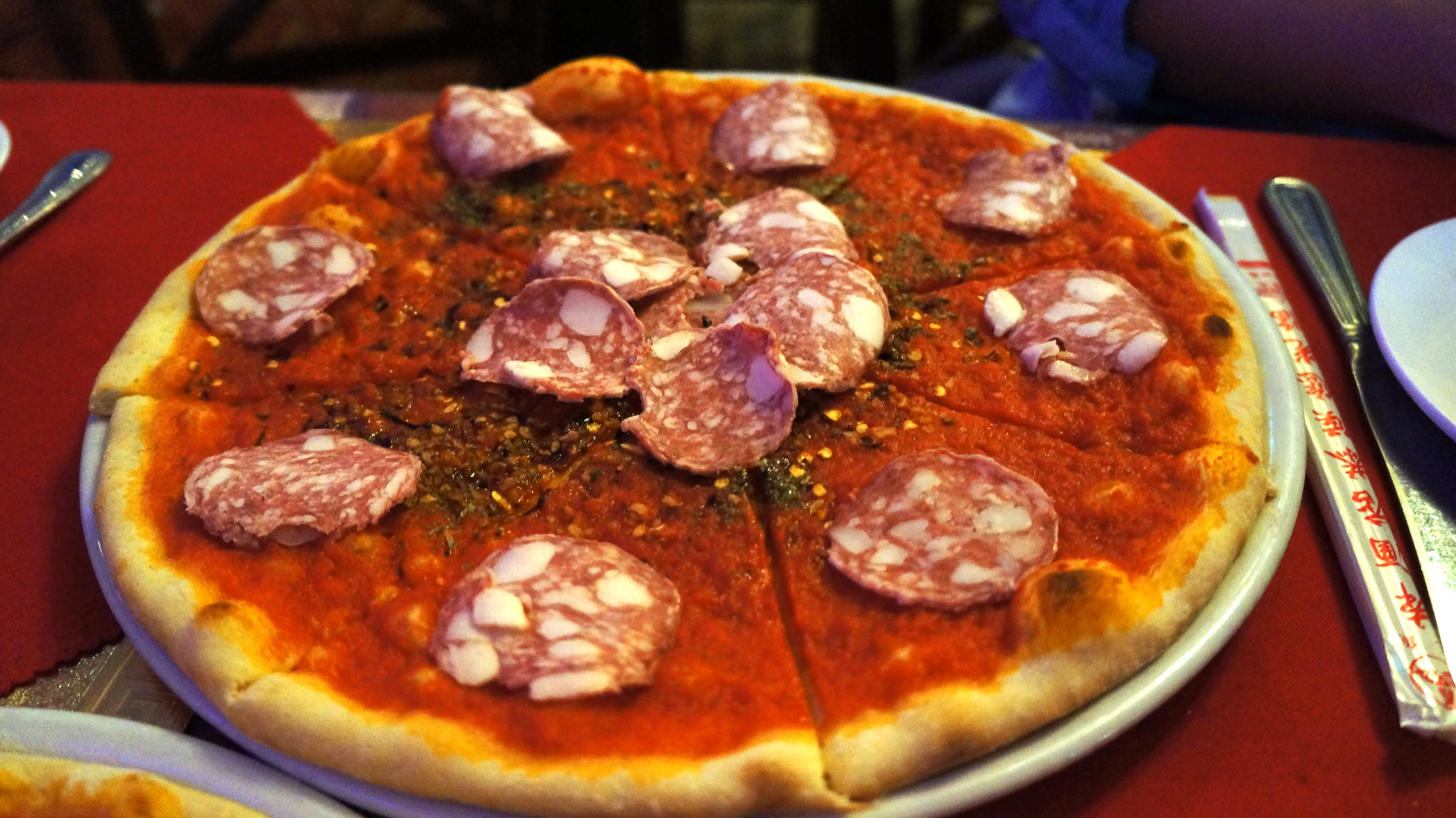
A pizza in North Korea

In response to publicity about Pizza Restaurant, London-based South Korean artist Kim Hwang created a short film series, "Pizzas for the People". After filming in South Korea and premiering at a festival in Heidelberg, the series was burned onto 500 DVDs, which five smugglers brought across the border into North Korea. The series satirizes the exclusivity of pizza in North Korea and combines elements of a cooking show and mockumentary. It presents aspects of Western democracy, and demonstrates how to make potato dough pizza with tofu instead of cheese and a liquor bottle as a rolling pin. Kim Hwang's smugglers brought back fan mail from viewers, but he did not know how many North Koreans the film series reached.

=== Additional pizzerias ===
According to travel writer Jamie Fullerton, Pyolmuri Café, a European-style café that opened with funding from the Adventist Development and Relief Agency, was the first restaurant in Pyongyang to serve pizza.

In 2011, a new pizzeria owned by Corital, an Italian–North Korean joint venture, was reported to serve Coca-Cola. Coca-Cola said it did not authorize the sale of the product, which would violate United States sanctions against North Korea.

The third Italian restaurant in Pyongyang, Italy Pizza, opened in late 2015 as part of the launch of Mirae Scientists Street. It serves less traditional pizza than the Kwangbok Street pizzeria. Its staff performs live music twice a day. Vice described its decor as "1970s cruise liner-level kitsch" and its pizza as "pretty good" despite being served without cheese. The restaurant existed before the redevelopment of Mirae Street, when the building was replaced with another at the same location.

== Popularity ==
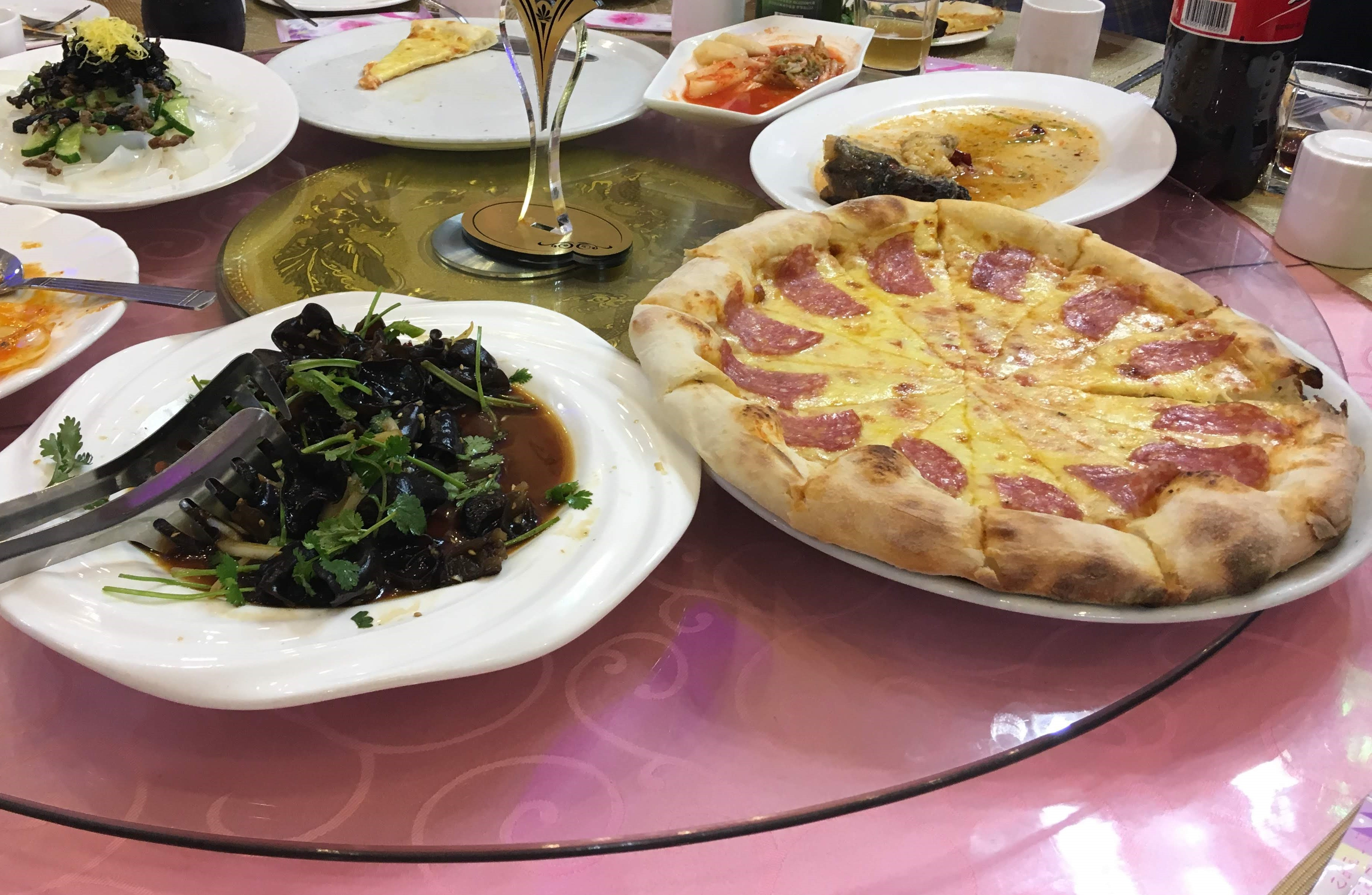
Pizza served in a Pyongyang restaurant

As of 2021, Pyongyang has five restaurants that serve pizza. It has more Italian restaurants than Chinese restaurants. North Korean street markets, a major source of food, sell pepperoni pizza for wealthy customers. North Korean foreign propaganda videos, such as the Echo of Truth YouTube series, have shown pizzerias.

In 2018, a pizza cost about US$5 to US$10 ($6 to $13 in 2025), which most North Koreans cannot afford. Pizza is eaten by Pyongyang elites, diplomats, and foreigners. A pizza may cost a month's salary for a middle-ranking official. Since middle- and upper-class individuals are allowed to live in cities, Western-style restaurants have become popular in Pyongyang.

Restaurants serve pizza with traditional toppings, as well as local varieties like kimchi pizza. All restaurants, including pizzerias, serve familiar dishes in North Korean cuisine. Most customers order these rather than pizza.

== See also ==
- North Korean cuisine
