= North Korean cuisine =

Culinary traditions of North Korea

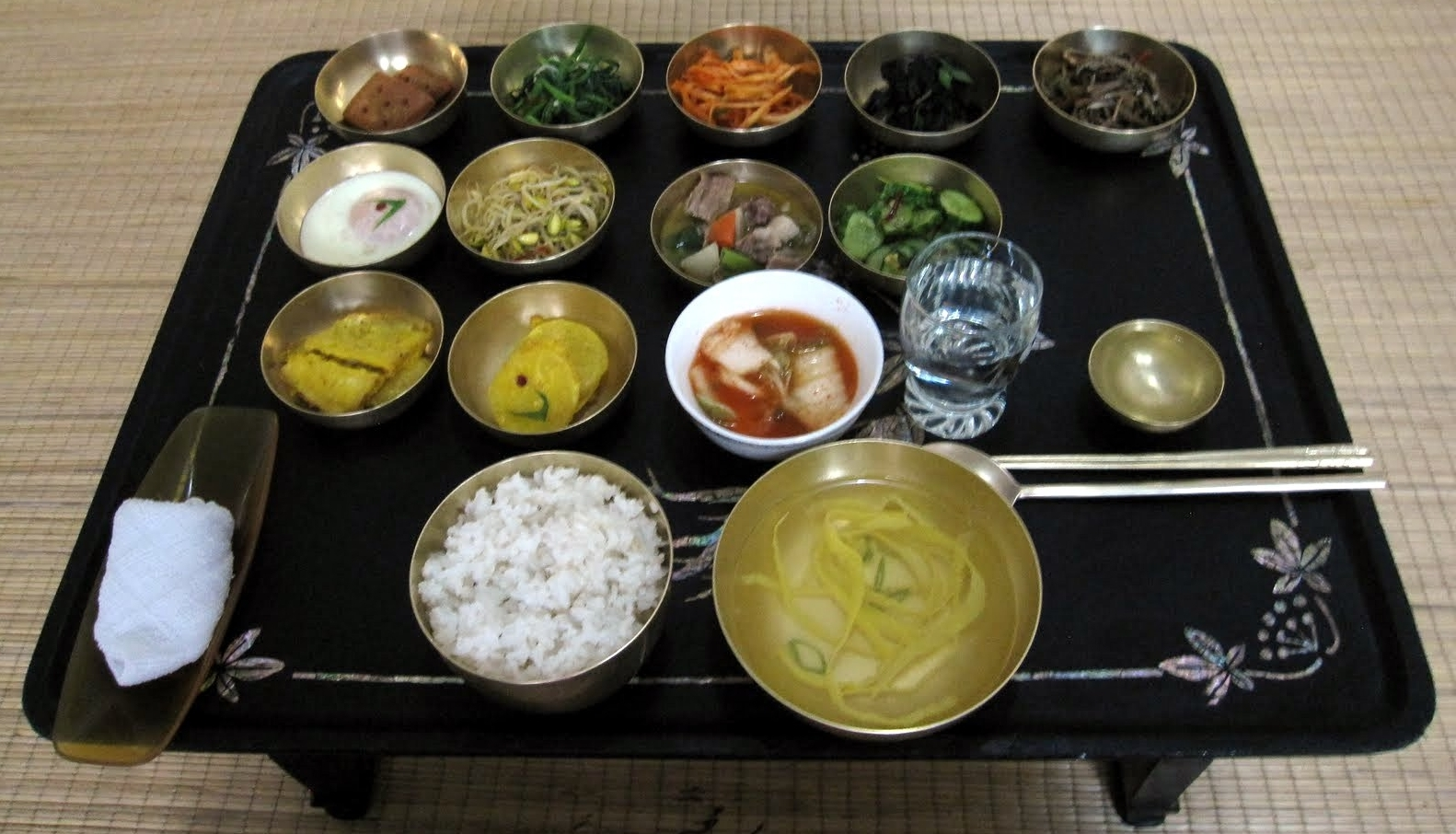
Various North Korean dishes and foods

North Korean cuisine is the traditional culinary practices and dishes of North Korea. Its foundations are laid by the agricultural and nomadic traditions in southern Manchuria and the Korean Peninsula. Some dishes are shared with South Korea; however, availability and quality of Northern cuisine is much more significantly affected by sociopolitical class divides.

Historically, Korean cuisine has evolved through centuries of social and political change. Originating in ancient agricultural and nomadic traditions in southern Manchuria and the Korean Peninsula, it has gone through a complex interaction of the natural environment and different cultural trends. Rice dishes and kimchi are staple Korean foods. In a traditional meal, they accompany both side dishes (panch'an) and main courses like chuk (porridge), pulgogi (grilled meat) or myŏn (noodles). Soju liquor is the best-known traditional Korean spirit.

== North Korean cuisine ==
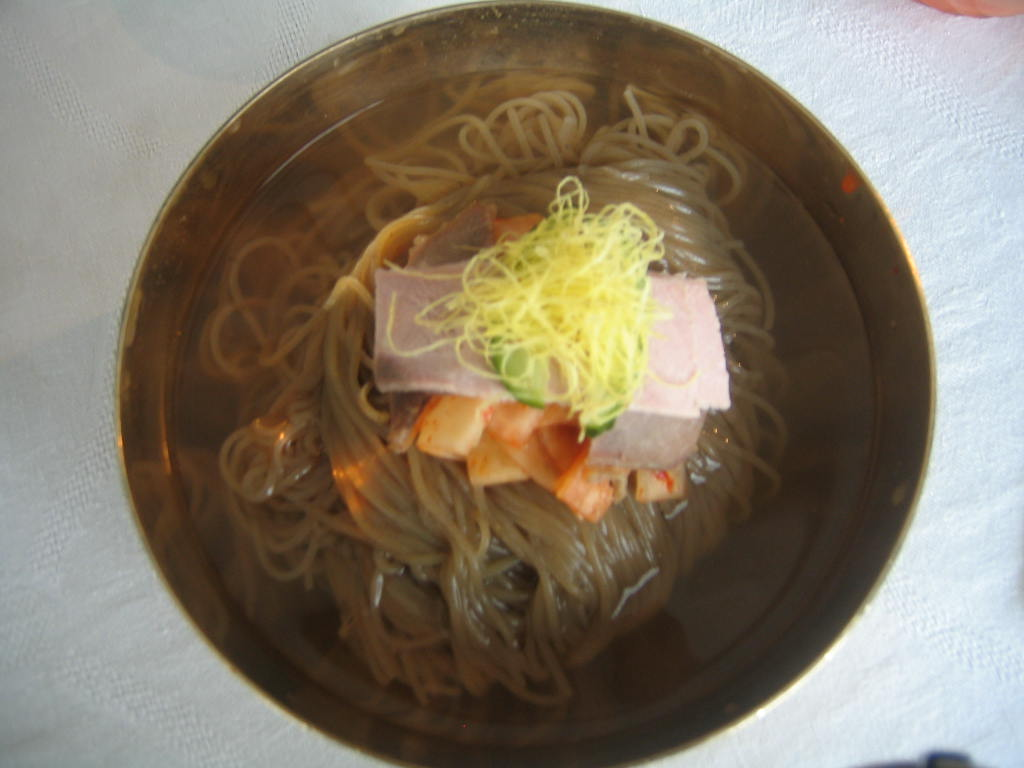
P'yŏngyang-raengmyŏn (평양랭면/평양냉면) is a cold noodle dish.

Some North Korean dishes and foods are also prepared in South Korea, and many dishes that originated in North Korea were brought to South Korea by migrating families after the Korean War. Many of these imported dishes became staples in the South Korean diet.

The most popular dish that originates in North Korea is called naengmyeon (냉면) in South Korea and raengmyŏn (랭면) in North Korea. The most popular type of naengmyeon is called P'yŏngyang-raengmyŏn (평양냉면) . It is usually served in a big and deep bowl with beef, pheasant, or tongch'imi broth. It is usually served with cold hand-pulled buckwheat noodles in the cold broth, topped with pickled radish, eggs etc. It is usually sided with vinegar and a diluted mustard seed condiment/oil. A different yet popular version of raengmyŏn originates from Hamhung, the hoe raengmyŏn (회 랭면). Hoe raengmyŏn is pibim raengmyŏn with additional marinated raw fish (hoe), usually skate. It is eaten with koch'ujang and other ingredients mixed. Vinegar, sugar, and sometimes sesame oil is added according to taste. The noodles of Hamhŭng raengmyŏn are typically made from potato or sweet potato starch, causing them to be chewier.

The flavors of some North Korean dishes differ from South Korean versions, with some being less spicy and more varied in composition than South Korean preparations. North Korean dishes have been described as having a specific tanginess that is created from the interplay of spicy, sour and sweet flavors.

Some restaurants, particularly in Pyongyang, have expensive pricing relative to average worker wages in North Korea. North Korean citizens typically cannot afford such restaurants. Due to their pricing, upscale restaurants are typically available only to well-paid leaders of the North Korean government, tourists visiting the country, and the emerging affluent middle class of tonju (돈주) in the country. Tonju means "masters of money", and the tonju typically hold positions in the government, positions operating state-owned businesses outside of the country, and positions involving bringing investments and the importation of products into the country.

Some street foods exist in North Korea, such as in Pyongyang, where vendors operate food stalls. The first pizzeria in North Korea opened in 2009. Alcoholic beverages are produced and consumed in North Korea, and the country's legal drinking age is 18.

== North Korean dishes and foods ==
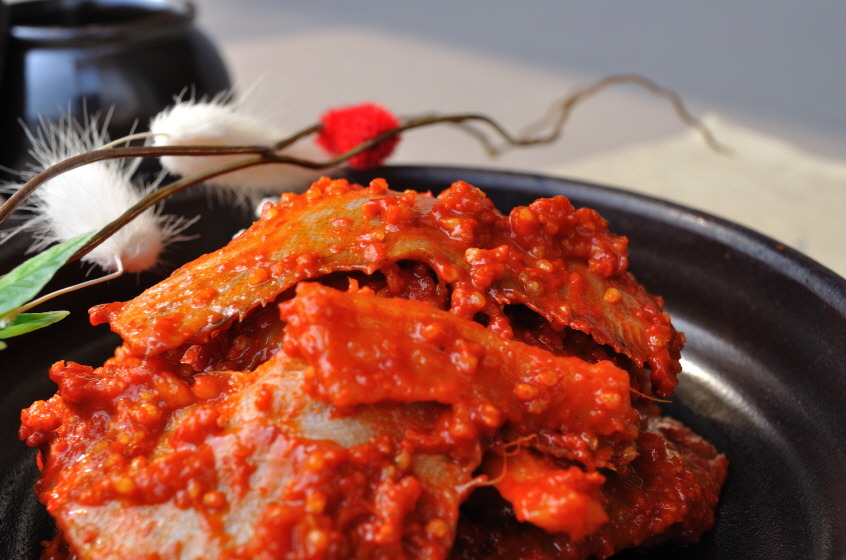
An example of kajami shik'ae, a fermented and salted food prepared in North Korea using flounder

- Barley
- Beef rib soup, a food normally eaten by high-ranking people; due to cows being crucial to farming by commoners.
- Bellflower
- Ch'amgŏnggeal – also known as sea urchin or uni (Japanese: ウニ).
- Chapch'ae
- Chicken
- Chinese cabbage stew
- Chokbal – consists of pig's trotters cooked with soy sauce and various spices. Additional ingredients can include onion, leeks, garlic, cinnamon and black pepper.
- Cookies
- Corn – it is not uncommon for North Koreans to grind corn, often including the corn cobs and husks to extend the mixture
- Edible mushrooms – such as wild pine mushrooms

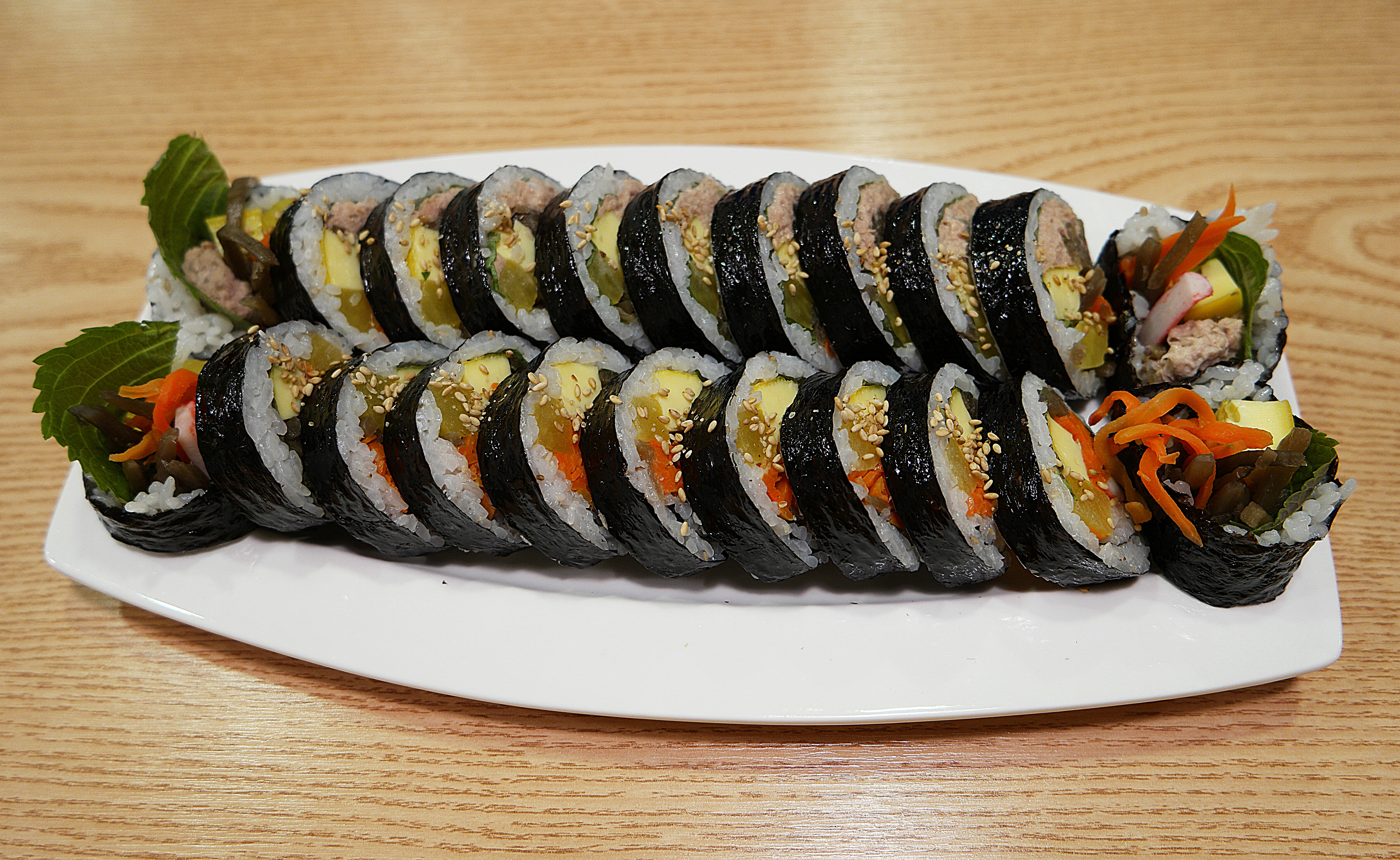
An example of kimbap

- Herbs and greens – used as an ingredient and in salads
- Hot pot

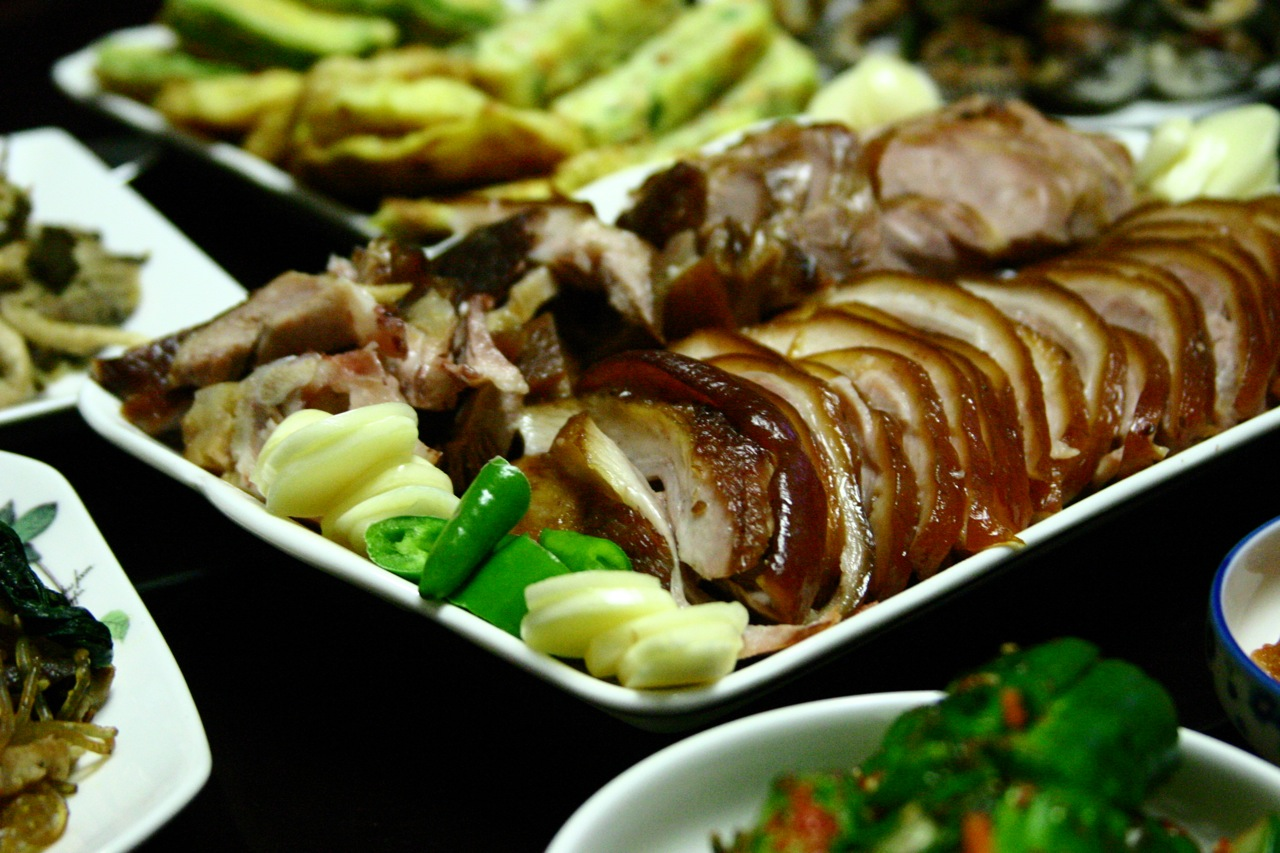
An example of chokbal

- Kajami shik'ae – a fermented and salted food prepared in North Korea using flounder and additional ingredients such as quinoa, garlic, ginger and chili flakes.
- Kimbap
- Kimchi – very common in North Korea, it is consumed as both a condiment and as a side dish, and often accompanies every meal. Kimchi is relied upon by North Koreans during the winter months when fresh vegetables are unavailable.
  - Kkaktuki – diced radish kimchi
- Kogi bap – a rice dish with artificial meat; it is a popular North Korean street food.
  - Injo kogi – sausages prepared using soybeans and other ingredients.
  - Injo kogi bap – cooked rice wrapped in a skin of leftover soybean paste.
- Korean chestnut
- Mandu – various dumplings, mandu styles vary in different regions of North Korea
  - P'yŏnsu – square-shaped mandu popular in Kaesong
- Meats – Pork is the most commonly consumed meat, along with rabbit, goat, beef, and occasionally dog
- Millet
- Miyŏk-kuk – a nutritious vegetable soup prepared with seaweed
- Namp'o hwibaryu chogaegui (petrol clam barbecue) – a type of North Korean street food popular in the city of Nampo. Clams are doused with petrol and set on fire for about five to ten minutes.

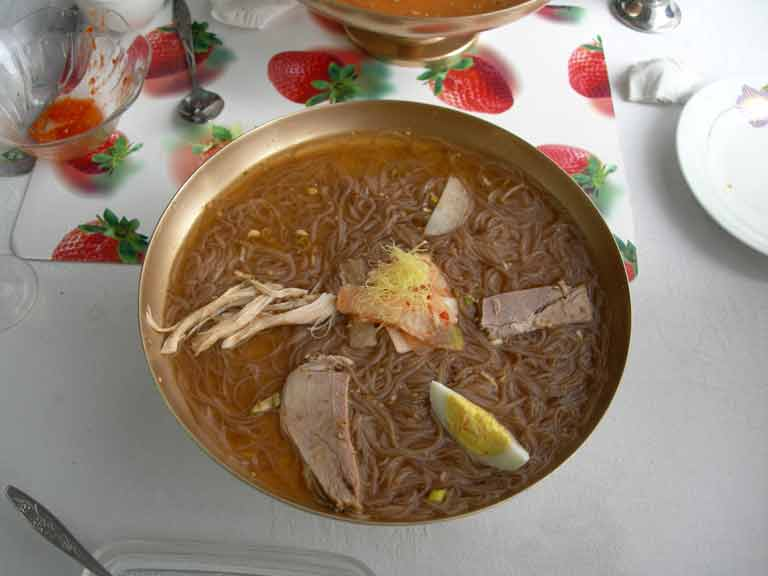
Raengmyŏn served at Okryu-gwan restaurant in Pyongyang, North Korea

- Noodles and noodle dishes – in North Korean culture, long noodles represent a long life or a long marriage, and long noodles are served to people at weddings.
  - Beef noodle soup
  - Corn noodles
  - Raengmyŏn – referred to as "naengmyeon" in South Korea, it is a traditional Korean cold noodle dish that is prepared using buckwheat noodles in North Korea.
  - Ramyŏn – referred to as "curly noodles" or kkoburang-kuksu (꼬부랑국수) in North Korea. Shin Ramyun is a brand of instant noodles produced in South Korea that is nicknamed "money ramen" in North Korea, due to its relatively expensive pricing in North Korea at around 800 won per unit. In 2009, boxes of Shin Ramyun that contain twenty packages of ramen per box cost around 30,000 North Korean won, which in North Korea is expensive, and therefore not available to most North Korean citizens at this price. (Note: "In North Korea it is only the high-ranking government officials and military officers who can afford to give and receive boxes of Shin Ramyun as a present," – stated to Radio Free Asia by a Seoul-based North Korean defector.)
  - Rice noodles

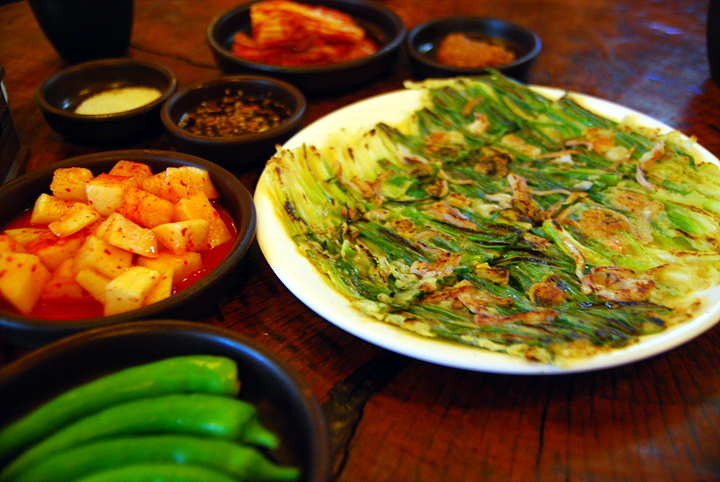
P'ajŏn: pictured is haemulp'ajŏn, a seafood scallion pancake

- P'ajŏn
- Panch'an – side dishes that accompany full meals, panch'an dishes are typically spicy, salty or tangy, and many are fermented, which adds flavor. Restaurants in North Korea typically charge for these accompaniments.
  - Pansangi – an arrangement of different foods and side dishes such as rice, broth, fermented vegetables and sometimes meat. It is a popular method of food preparation in Kaesong.
- Pheasant
- Pibimpap – white rice with vegetables and other ingredients
  - Tolsot pibimpap – hot stone pot pibimpap
- Pickled cucumber
- Pindae-ttŏk – a fried green bean pancake prepared using mung beans, green onion and kimchi. Pindae-ttŏk first appears under the name binjatteok in the Ŭmsik timibang, a cooking encyclopedia written in the 1670s by Chang Kyehyang, the wife of a public officer.
- Porridge – a staple food in North Korea
- Potatoes and potato dishes. See also: potato production in North Korea.
- Pulgogi – marinated and grilled beef
- Quail eggs and quail egg jelly
- Rice – short-grain rice is a staple food in North Korea.
- Rice cakes
- Seafood – seafood dishes and raw seafood are a part of the cuisine, and seafood is a staple food in North Korea
  - Alaska pollock
  - Clams
  - Cod
  - Kimbap sushi
  - Gray mullet fish soup
  - Octopus
  - Salmon and raw salmon
- Seaweed
- Shinsŏllo

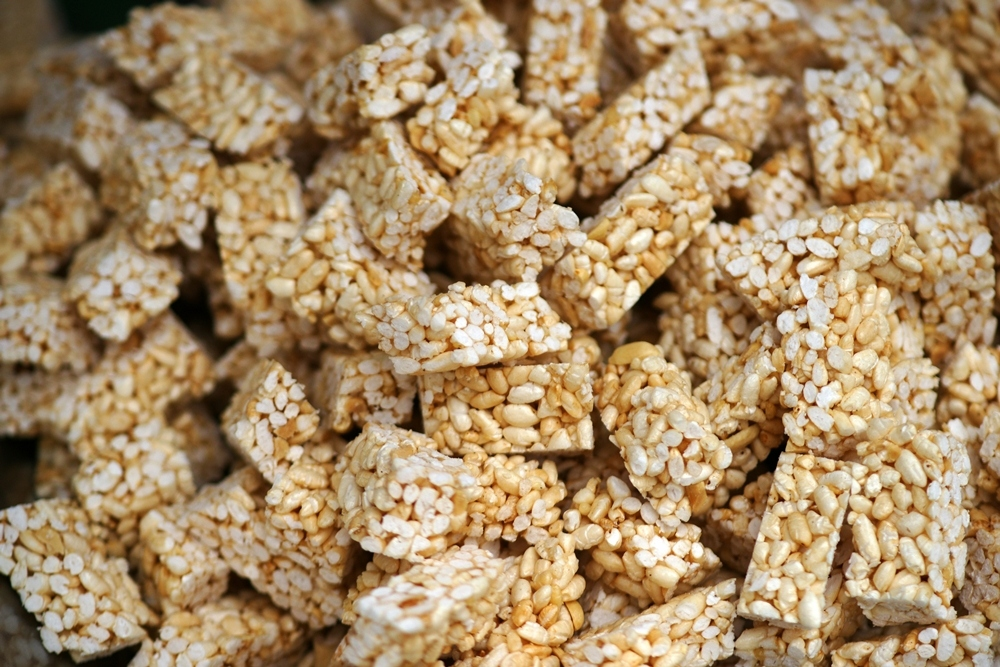
An example of kangjŏng

- Snack foods – examples of snack foods produced within North Korea include kangjŏng, cookies, puffy snacks and cotton candy pieces.
- Sundae – traditional Korean sausages that are a popular street food
- Sungŏ-kuk
- Tangogikuk – traditional soup with dog meat as a primary ingredient
- Tofu – a staple food in North Korea
  - Tofu bap – a tofu and rice dish that is a common street food in North Korea.
- Tot'ori-muk – acorn jelly
- Ttŏk – sticky rice cakes, sometimes with fillings
- Turkey
- Yakpap – a traditional sweet dish prepared using steamed glutinous rice, chestnuts, dates, honey and other ingredients
North Korean dishes and foods

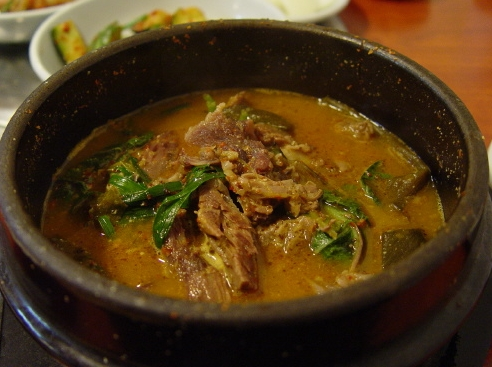
Tangogikuk

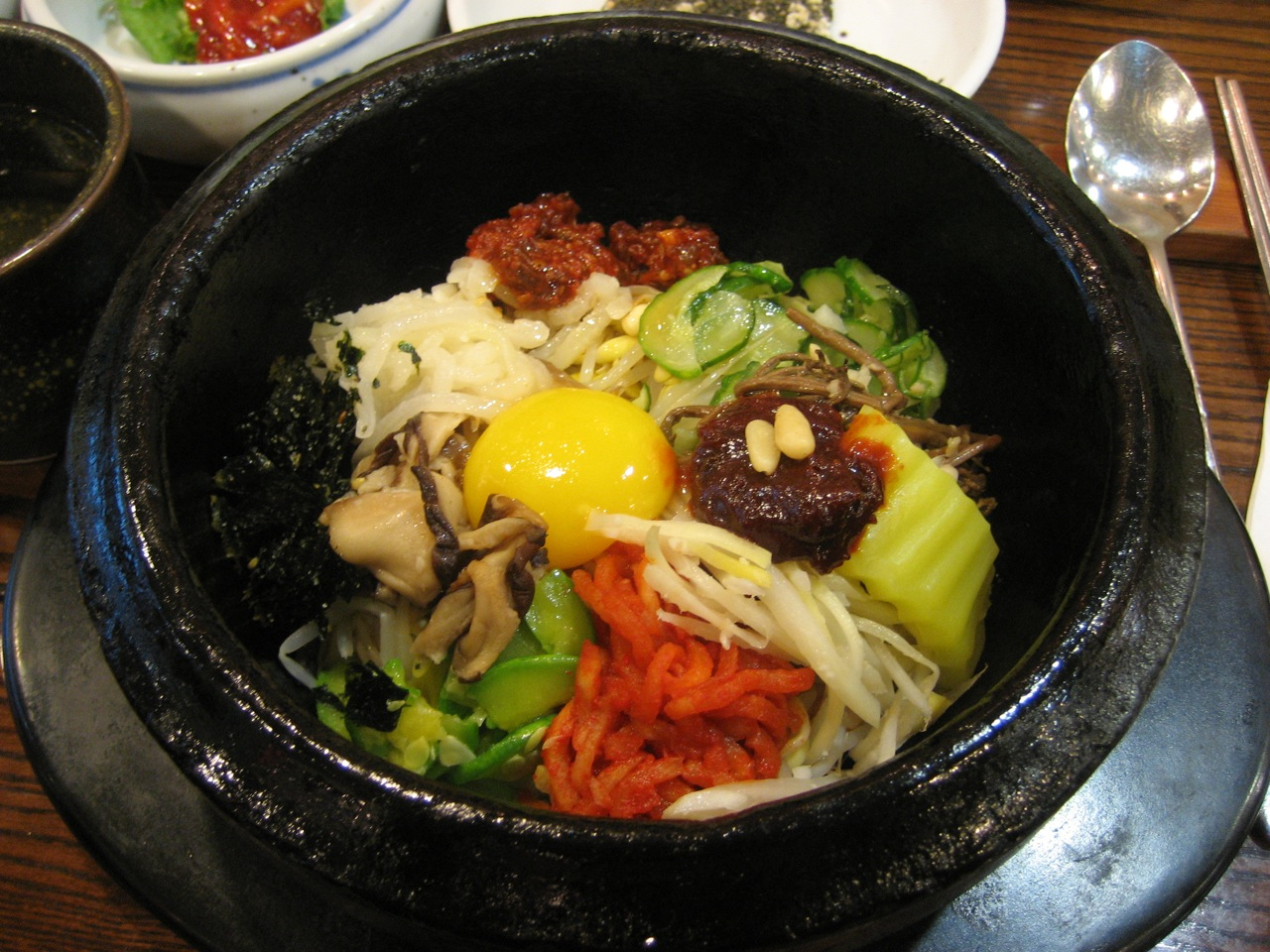
Tolsot pibimpap

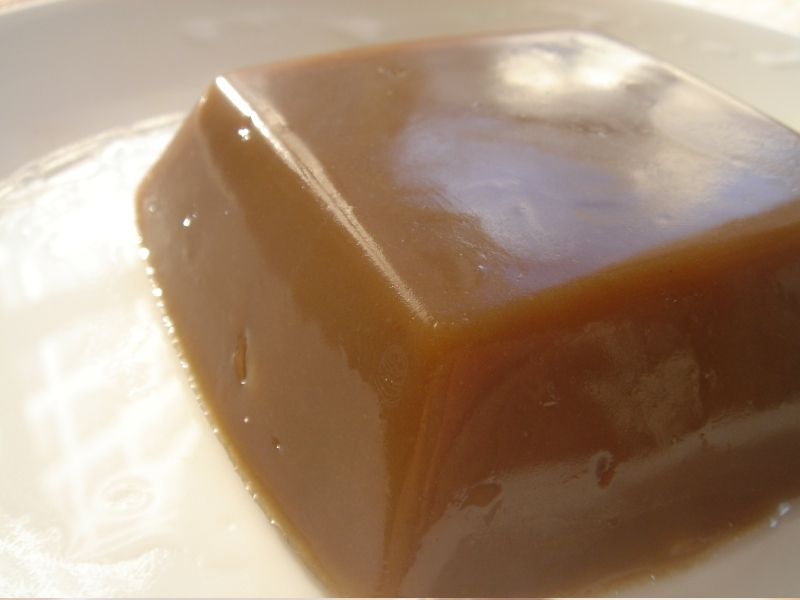
Unseasoned tot'orimuk

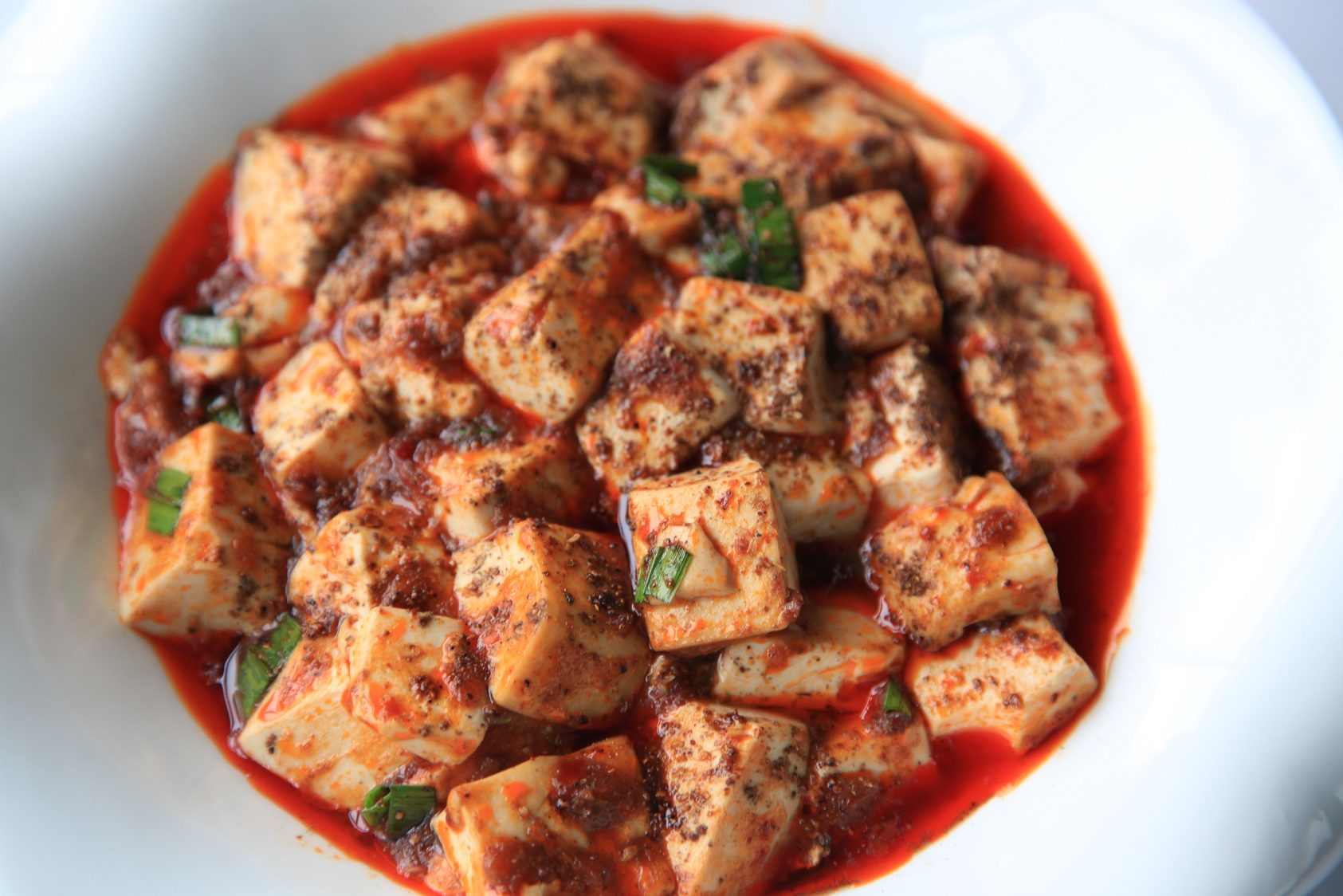
Mapo tofu originated in China, and is consumed in North Korea

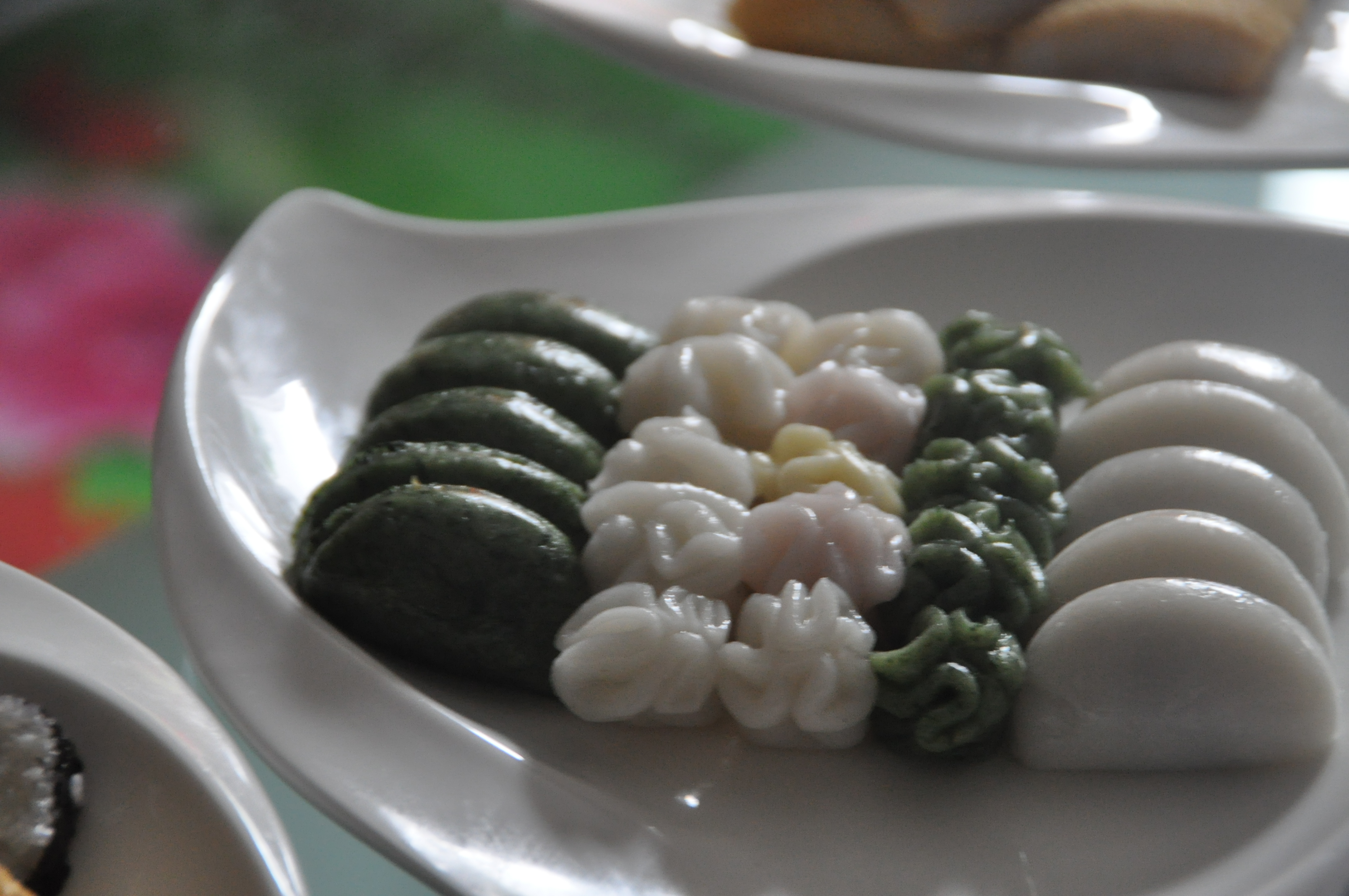
Ttŏk in Pyongyang, North Korea

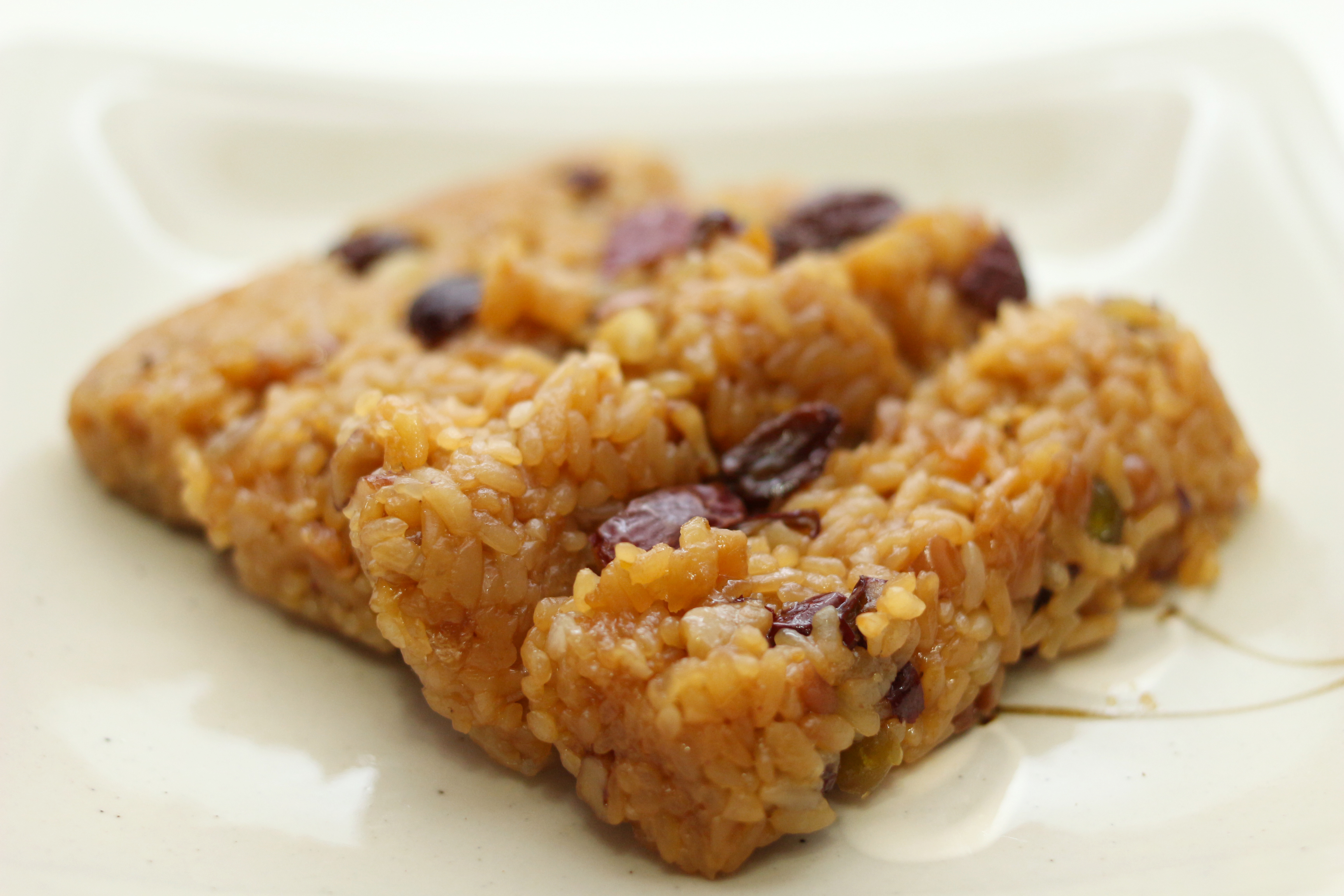
Yakpap

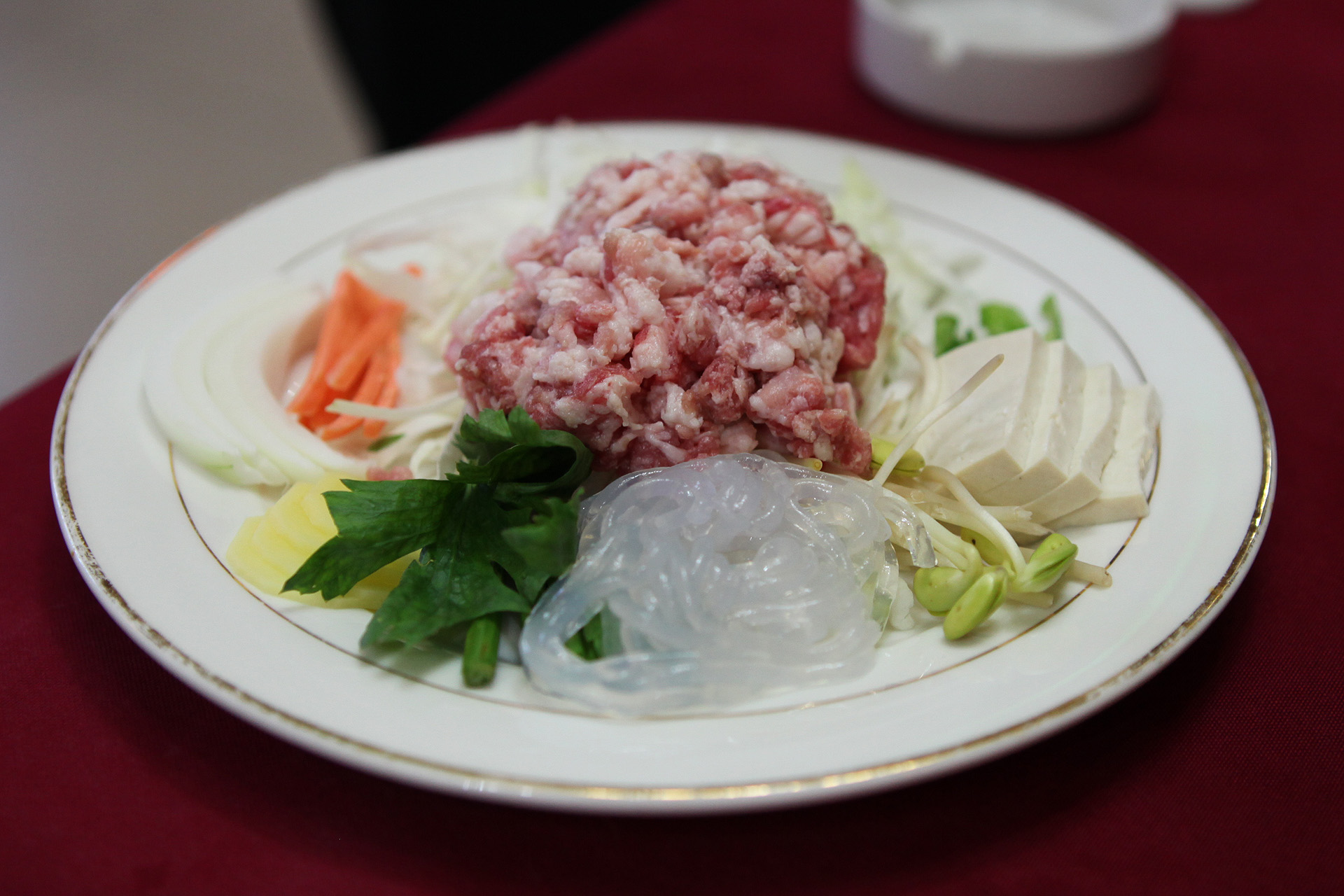
Some typical foods in North Korea

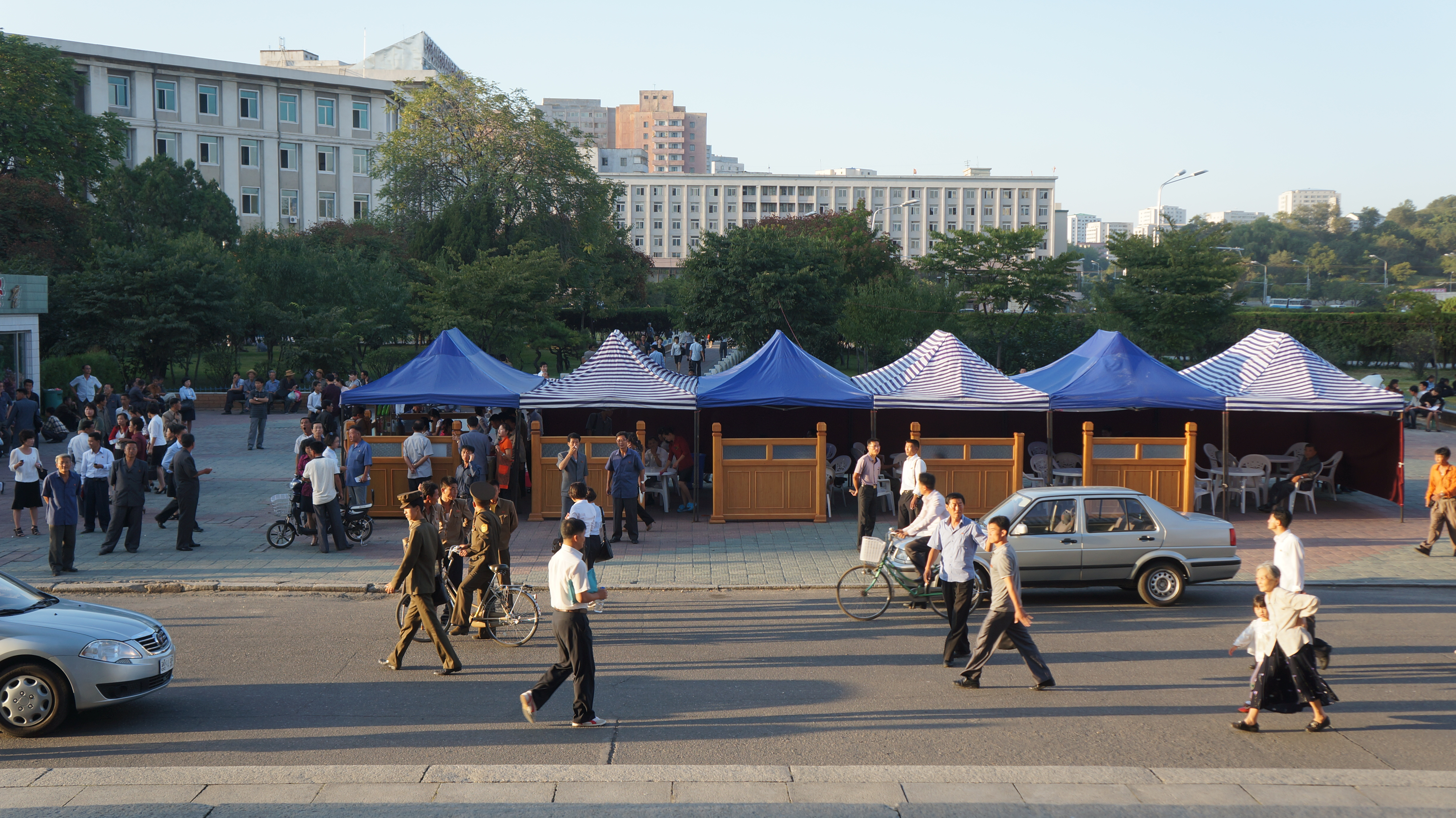
Street food vendors in Pyongyang, North Korea

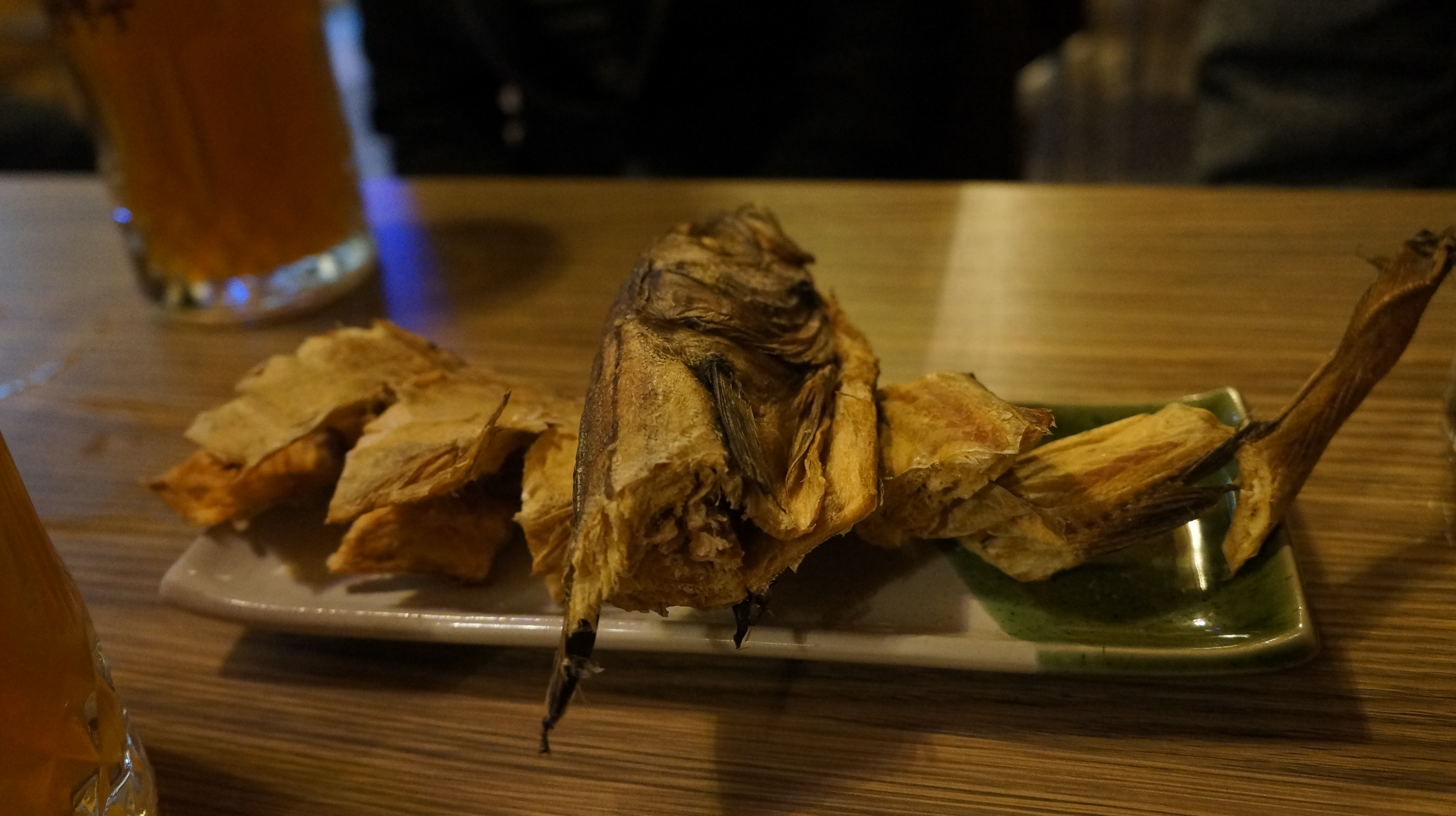
Dried pollock at the Rakwon Paradise Microbrewery. Dried pollock is a typical bar snack in some areas of North Korea.

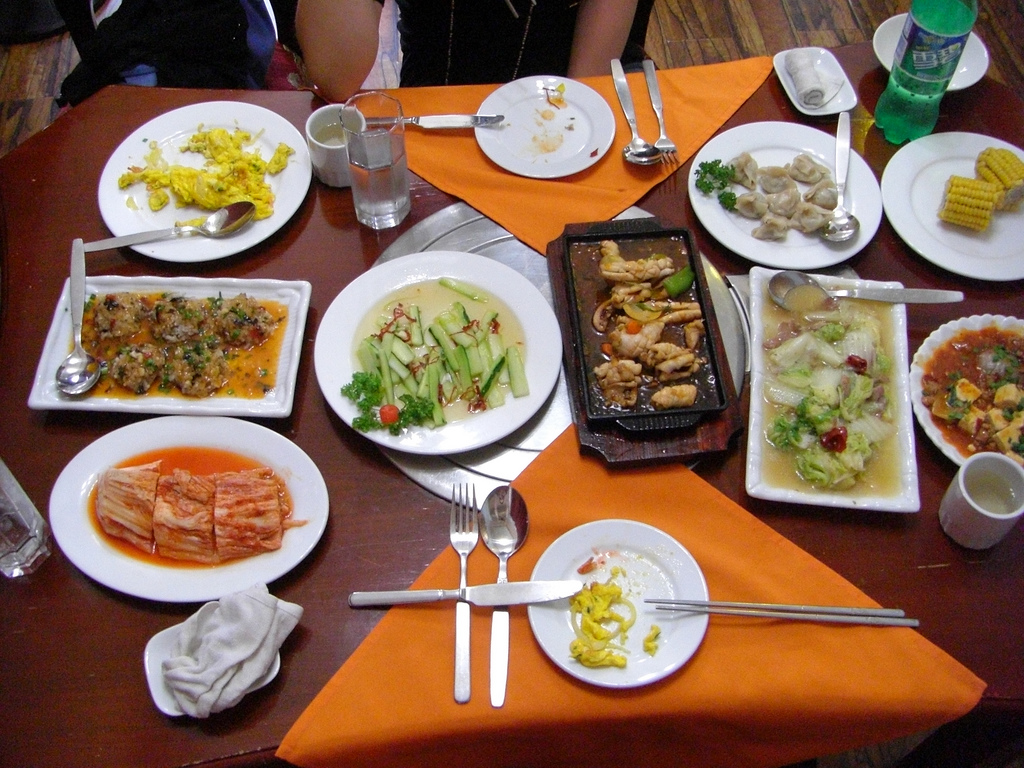
Lunch at a restaurant in Pyongyang

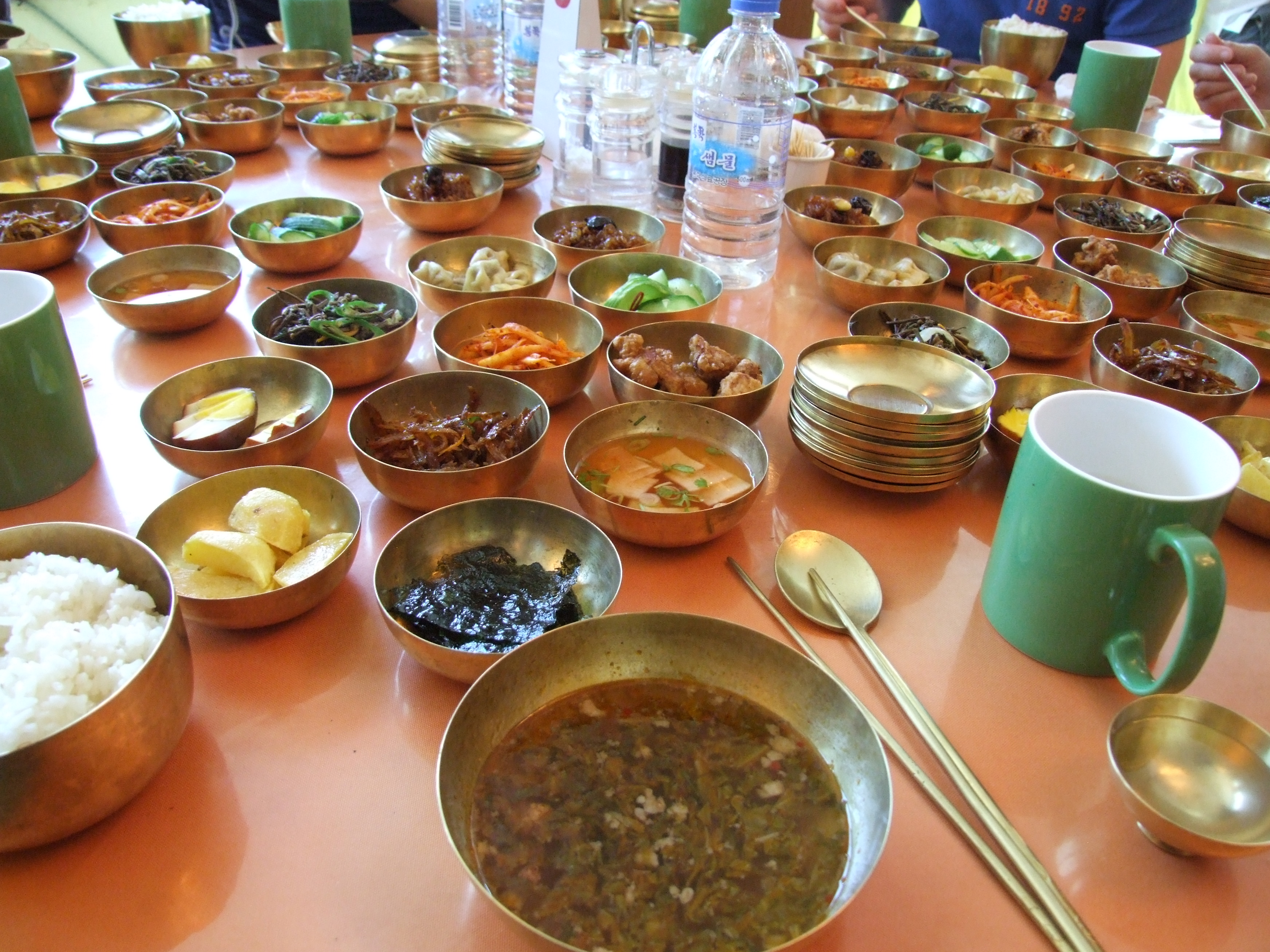
Lunch at a restaurant in Kaesong

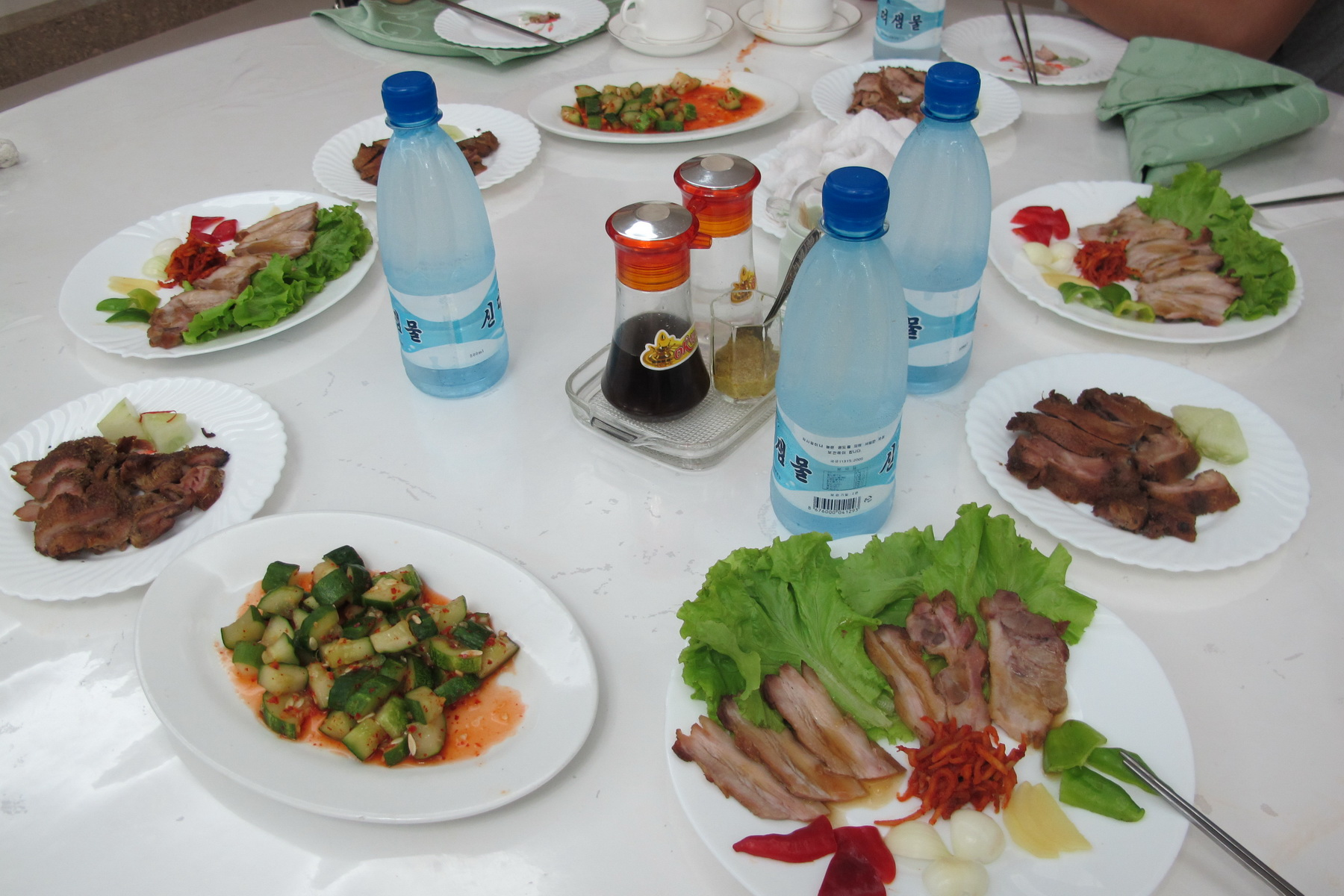
North Korean foods

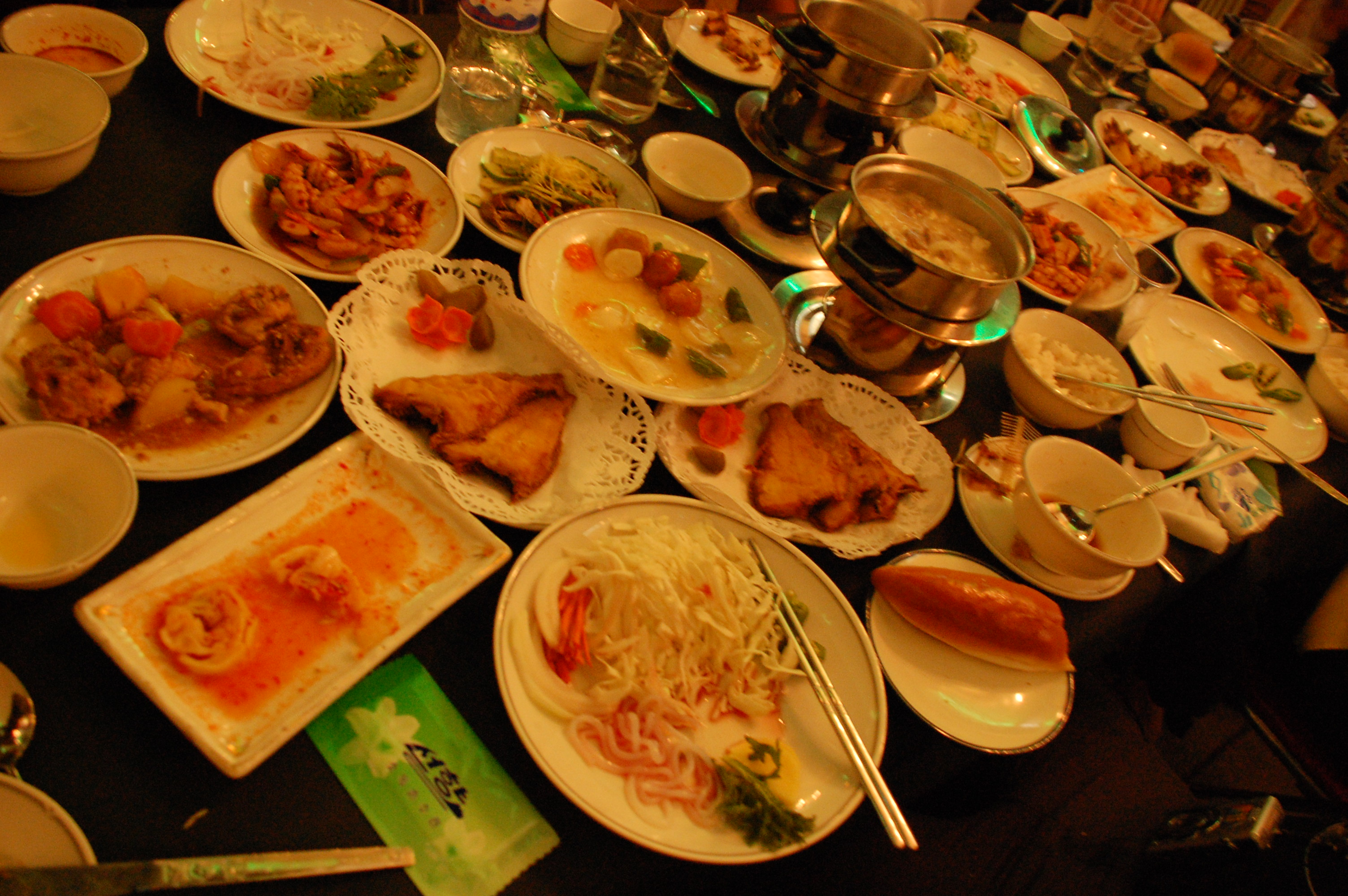
Foods at a restaurant in Pyongyang

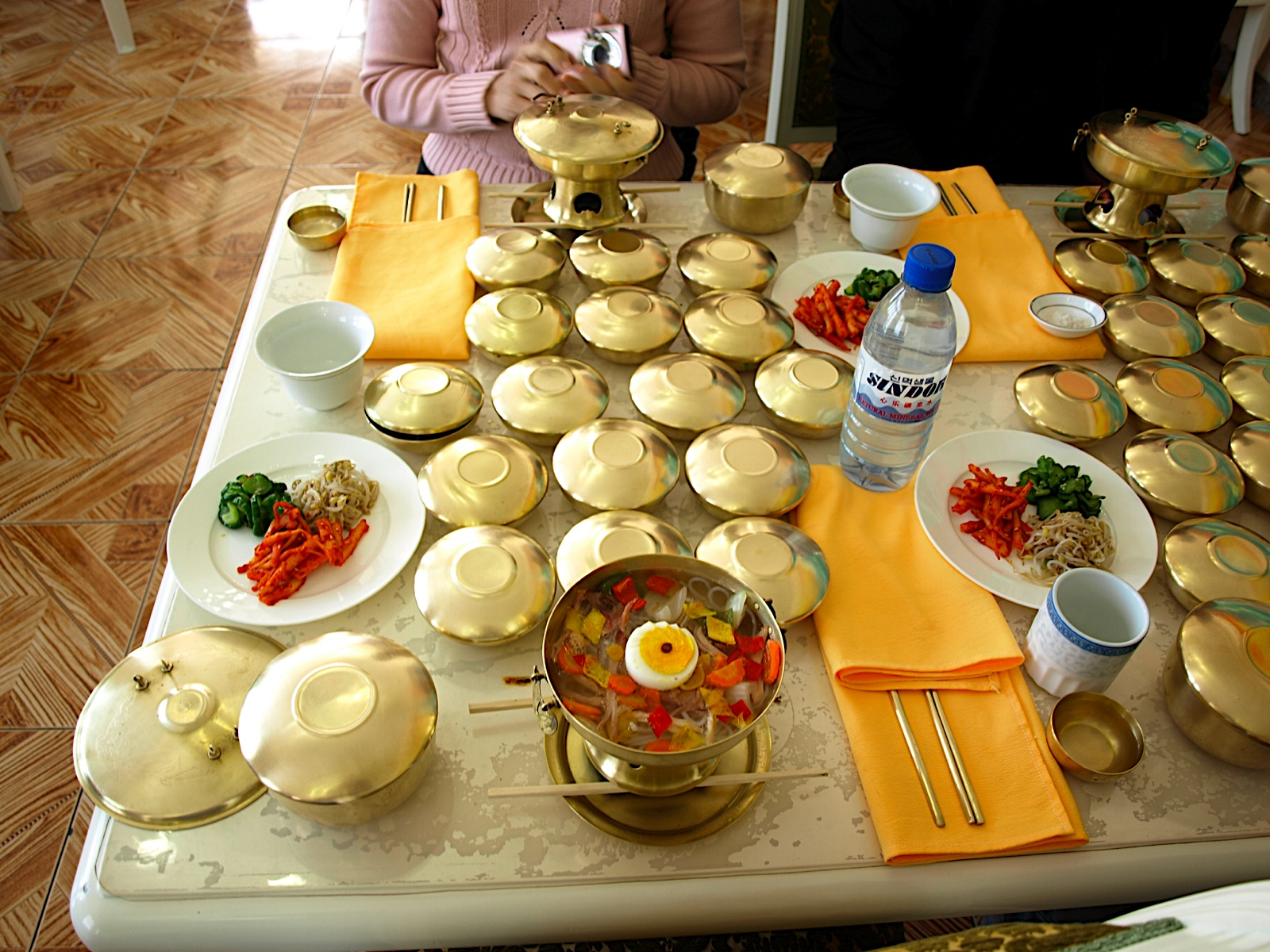
Covered dishes at Tongil restaurant in Kaesong

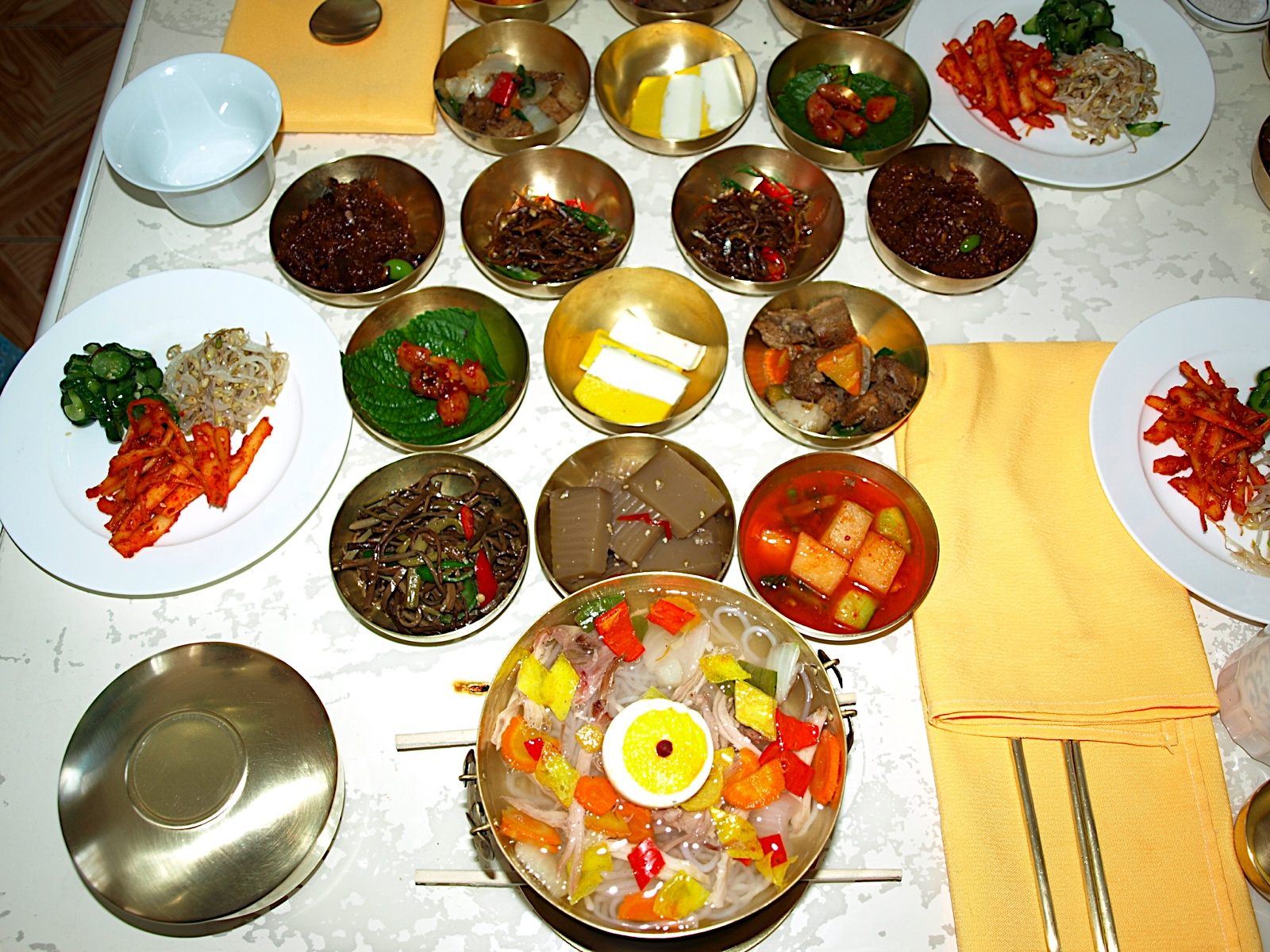
Dishes at Tongil restaurant in Kaesong

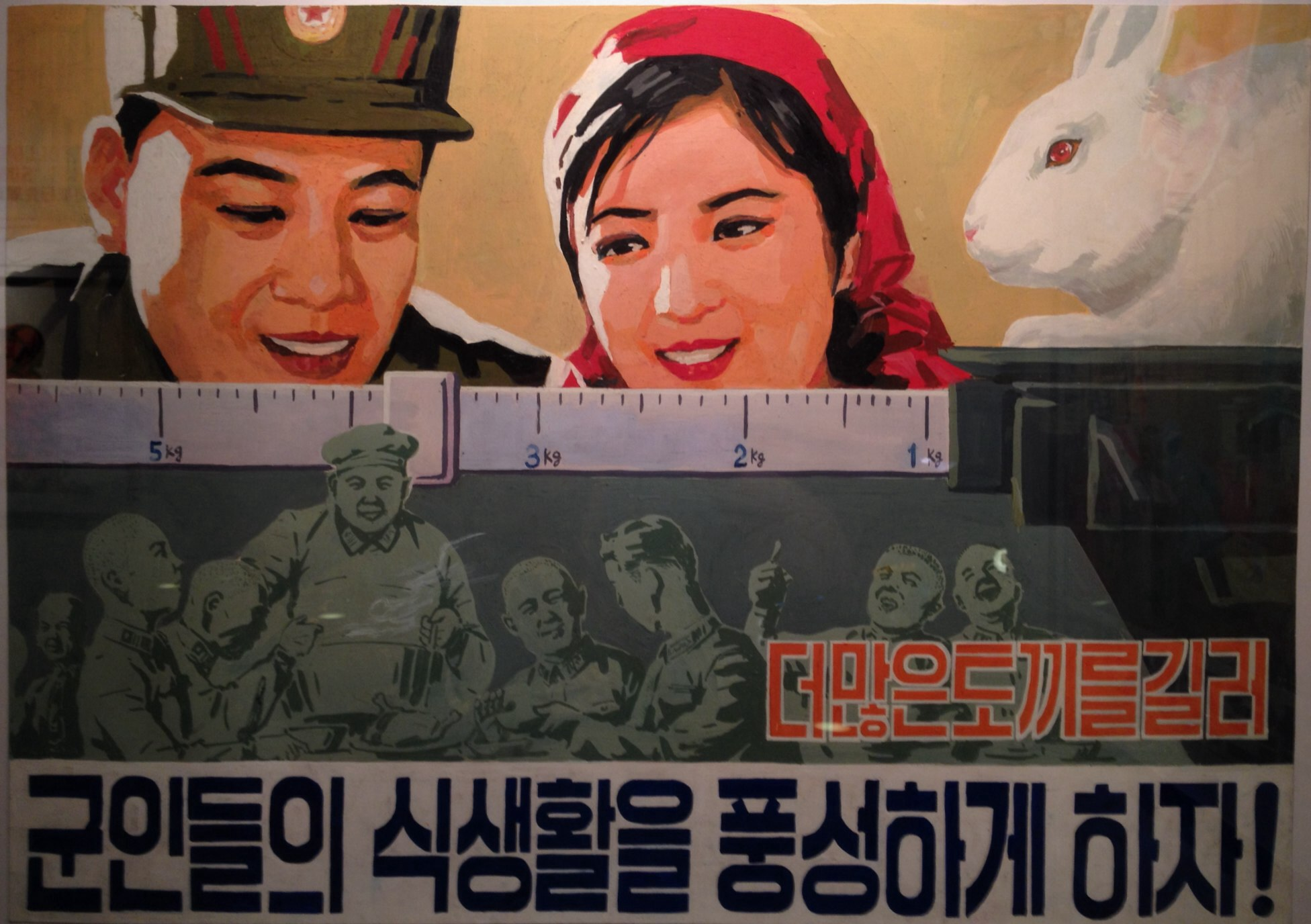
A North Korean propaganda poster stating, "Breed more rabbits and let our soldiers enjoy plentiful food!"

=== Condiments ===
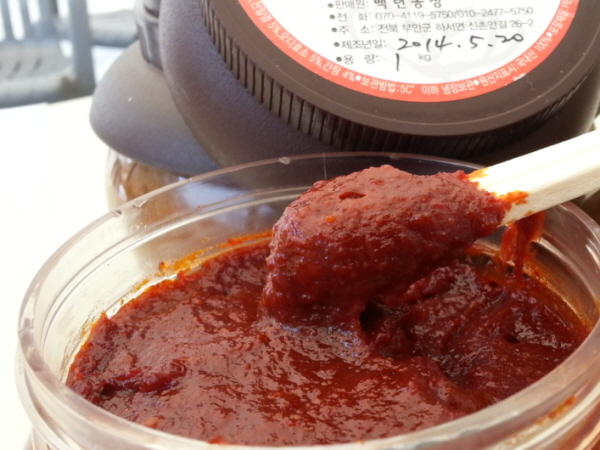

Some condiments used in North Korea to add flavor to foods are listed below.

- Bean paste
- Garlic
- Ginger
- Koch'ujang – prepared as a sauce and as a red pepper paste
- Pepper flakes
- Sesame oil
- Soy sauce

=== Beverages ===
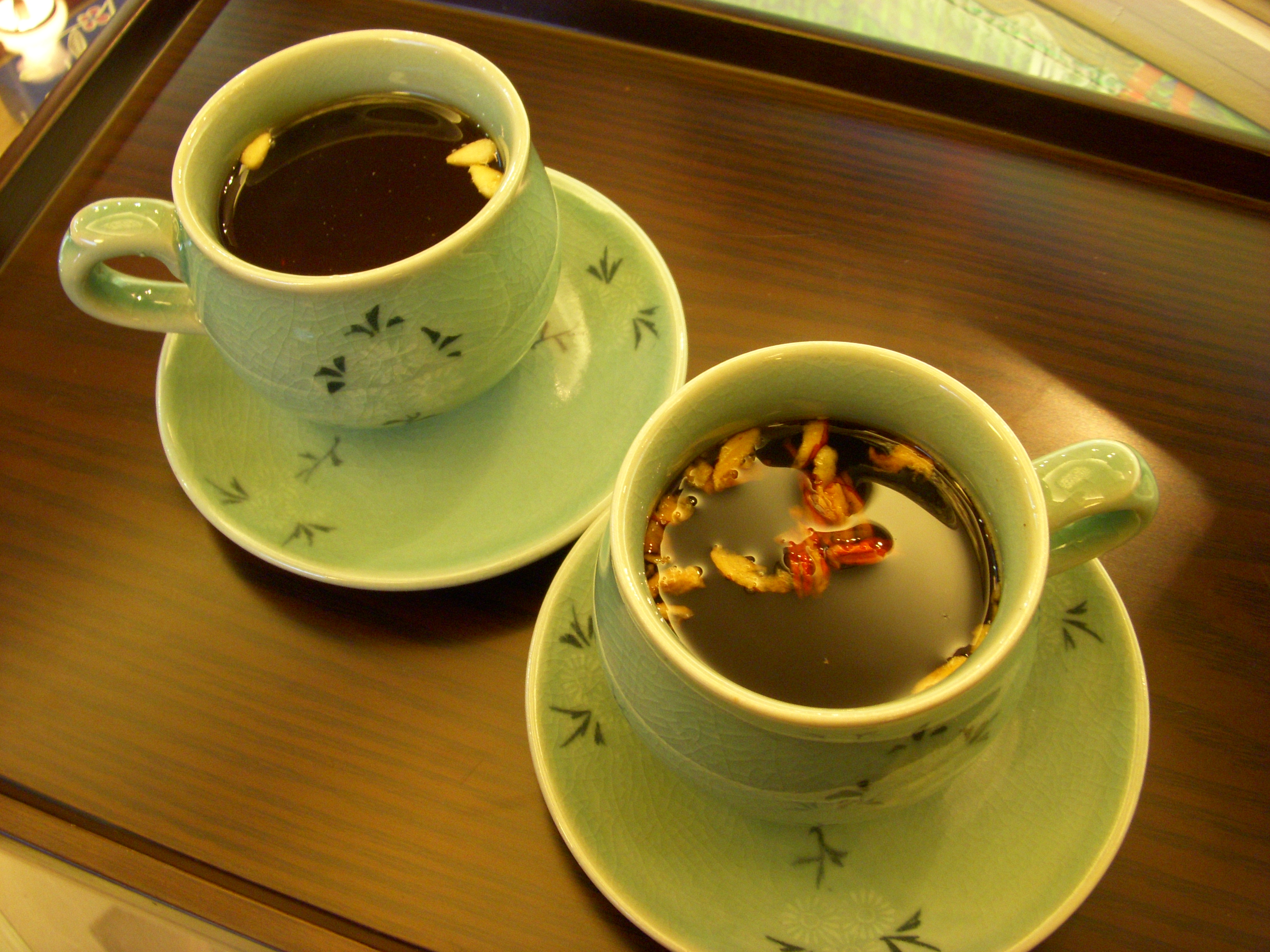

- Bottled water is imported from China, and is typically consumed by the donju, "the new affluent middle class" in North Korea. "Shindŏk' Saemmul" is a spring water produced in North Korea, but it is exported to countries in Southeast Asia, and is typically not available in the North Korean market.
- Coffee
  - Instant coffee – some instant coffee in North Korea is produced within the country
- Ginseng tea – a common beverage in North Korea
- Soft drinks – soft drink bottlers exist in North Korea, such as the Wonbong Trading Co. in Pyongyang. Soft drink products produced within North Korea are sometimes labeled as "carbonated sweet water". Sometime in 2017, Air Koryo, North Korea's flagship airline, began offering its own brand of soft drinks on flights to and from Beijing, China. Air Koryo soft drinks are also sold at some North Korean grocery stores. Coca-Cola bottled in China is available in upscale grocery stores in Pyongyang, and Pepsi bottled in China is also available, although it is rare compared to Coca-Cola's availability.
- Ryongjin Cocoa – a North Korean own brand cola made and canned in the country
- Taech'u-ch'a – a traditional Korean tea prepared with jujube and a pine nut garnish
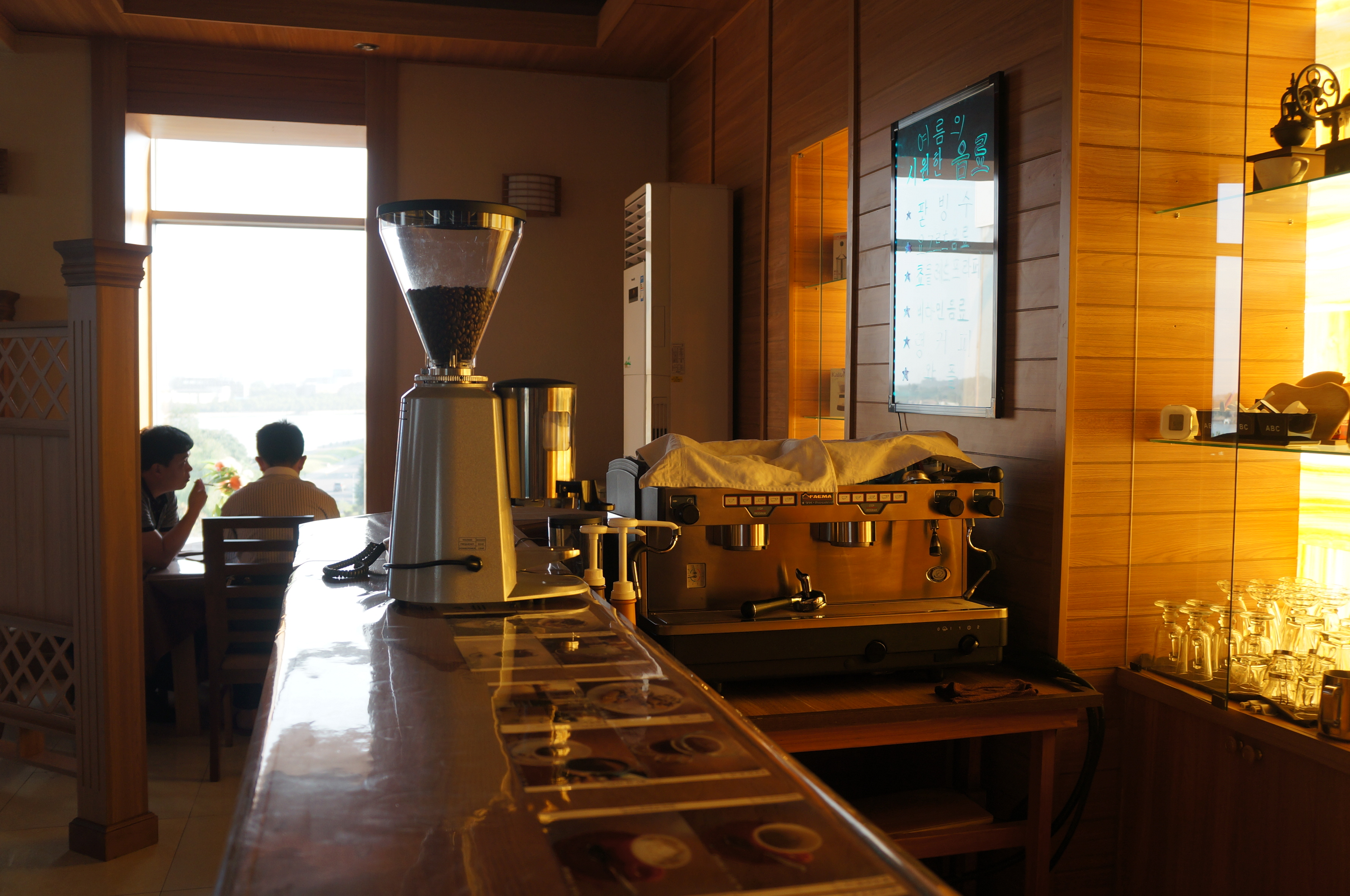
Coffee beans and an espresso machine at a coffee shop located next to the Pyongyang Hotel in Pyongyang, North Korea

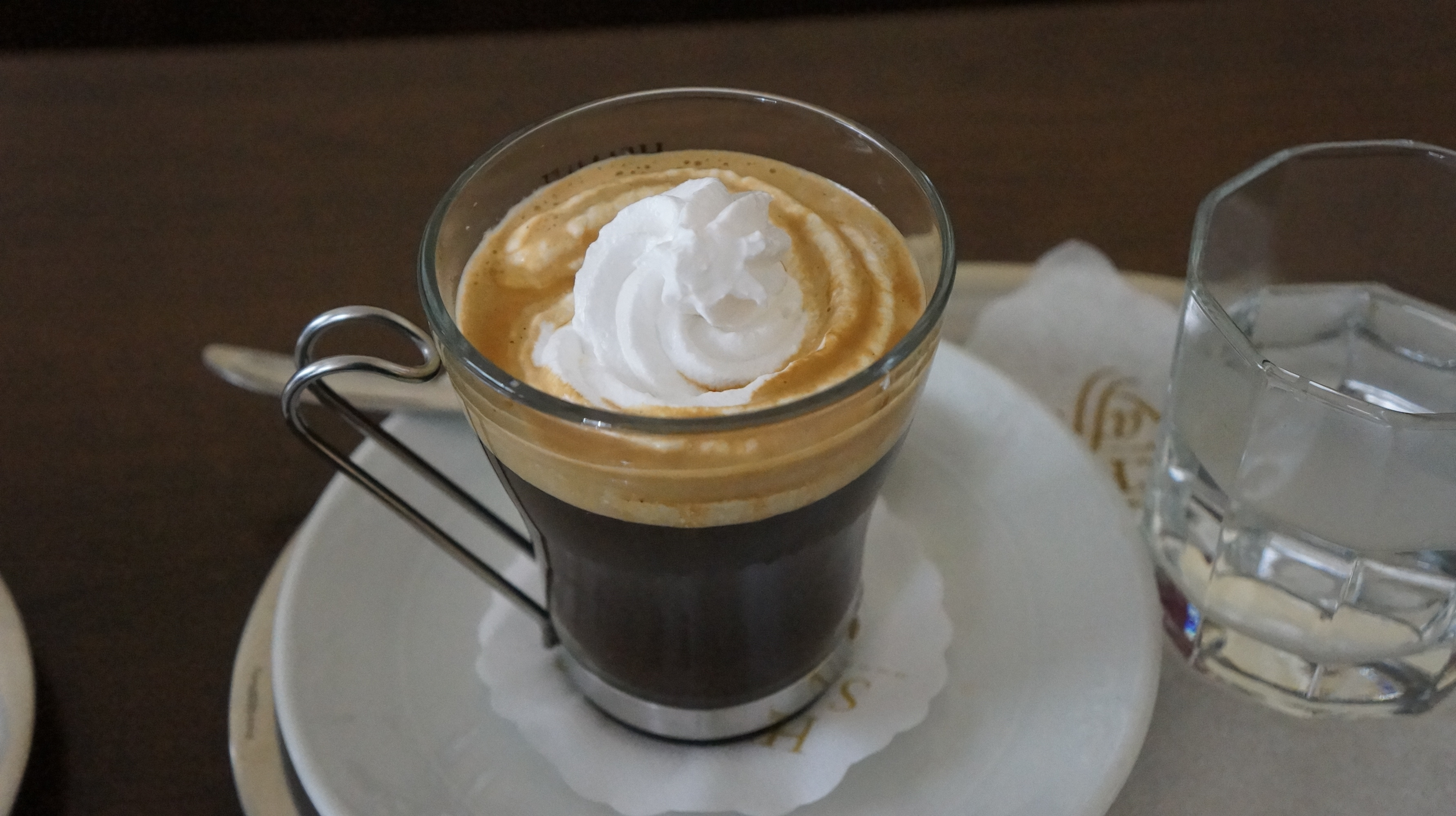
A coffee drink at Helmut Sachers Kaffee in Pyongyang, North Korea

==== Alcoholic beverages ====
Alcoholic beverages are consumed in North Korea, and drinking is a part of the culture of North Korea. North Korea's legal drinking age is 18, but minors are sometimes allowed to consume alcoholic beverages, and some shop keepers readily sell them alcoholic drinks. Some North Koreans brew and distill alcoholic beverages at home, despite such home alcohol production being forbidden in North Korea, and some sell these beverages to markets, although this is also illegal. Home brewed liquor is made using ingredients such as potatoes and corn. Some North Korean consumers purchase alcoholic beverages directly from alcohol-producing factories in the country, using cash. In recent times, imported Chinese liquor has been allowed to be sold in markets, and a well-known Chinese liquor purveyed in North Korea is Kaoliang Liquor, which has a 46–50% alcohol content.

North Korea has some bars and other drinking establishments, and in recent times, beer halls have become popular in Pyongyang.

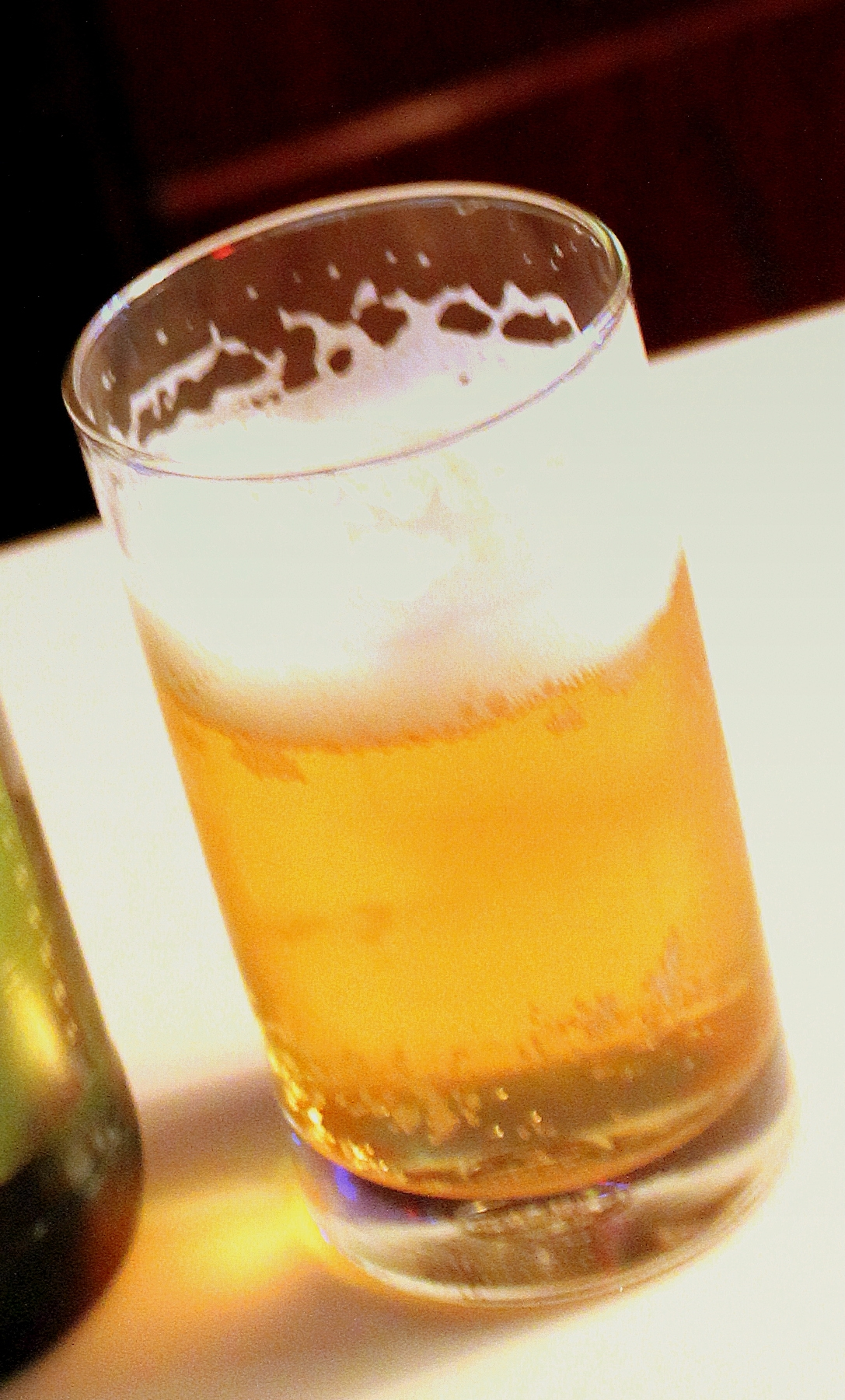
A glass of Taedonggang pilsner beer

- Beer is produced in North Korea, and craft beer production has increased in recent times. The major breweries in the country are Taedonggang Brewing Company, Paradise Microbrewery and the Yanggakdo Hotel Microbrewery. In August 2016, the Taedonggang Brewing Company held the country's first beer festival, which included several Taedonggang varieties and other local beers. Local beers at the festival included rice beer and dark beers.
  - Beer brands produced in North Korea
    - Pohak
    - Ponghak
    - Pyongyang
    - Rakwon ("Paradise")
    - Ryongsong
    - Samgak ("Delta")
    - Taedonggang – brewed by the state-owned Taedonggang Brewing Company based in Pyongyang In 2017, Taedonggang was the most popular beer in North Korea.
- Makkŏlli – a specialty rice wine with a milky appearance, it is common in the countryside of North Korea Makgeolli is produced using the same process used for the production of soju, and typically has a lower alcohol content compared to soju. It is considered by some to be inferior compared to soju.
- Rice liquor – rice-based liquor is consumed by more North Koreans compared to beer.
- Rice wine – glutinous rice wine is a specialty alcoholic beverage in North Korea
- Soju – referred to as nongtaegi in North Korea, soju is a clear specialty spirit prepared from sweet potato or barley in North Korea. It is similar to sake. In North Korea, soju's alcohol content ranges from 18 to 25 percent.
- Whisky – in 2019 North Korea created its first batch of homemade whisky. Samilpo Whisky has been designed to resemble Johnnie Walker to aid brand recognition for North Koreans
North Korean alcoholic beverages

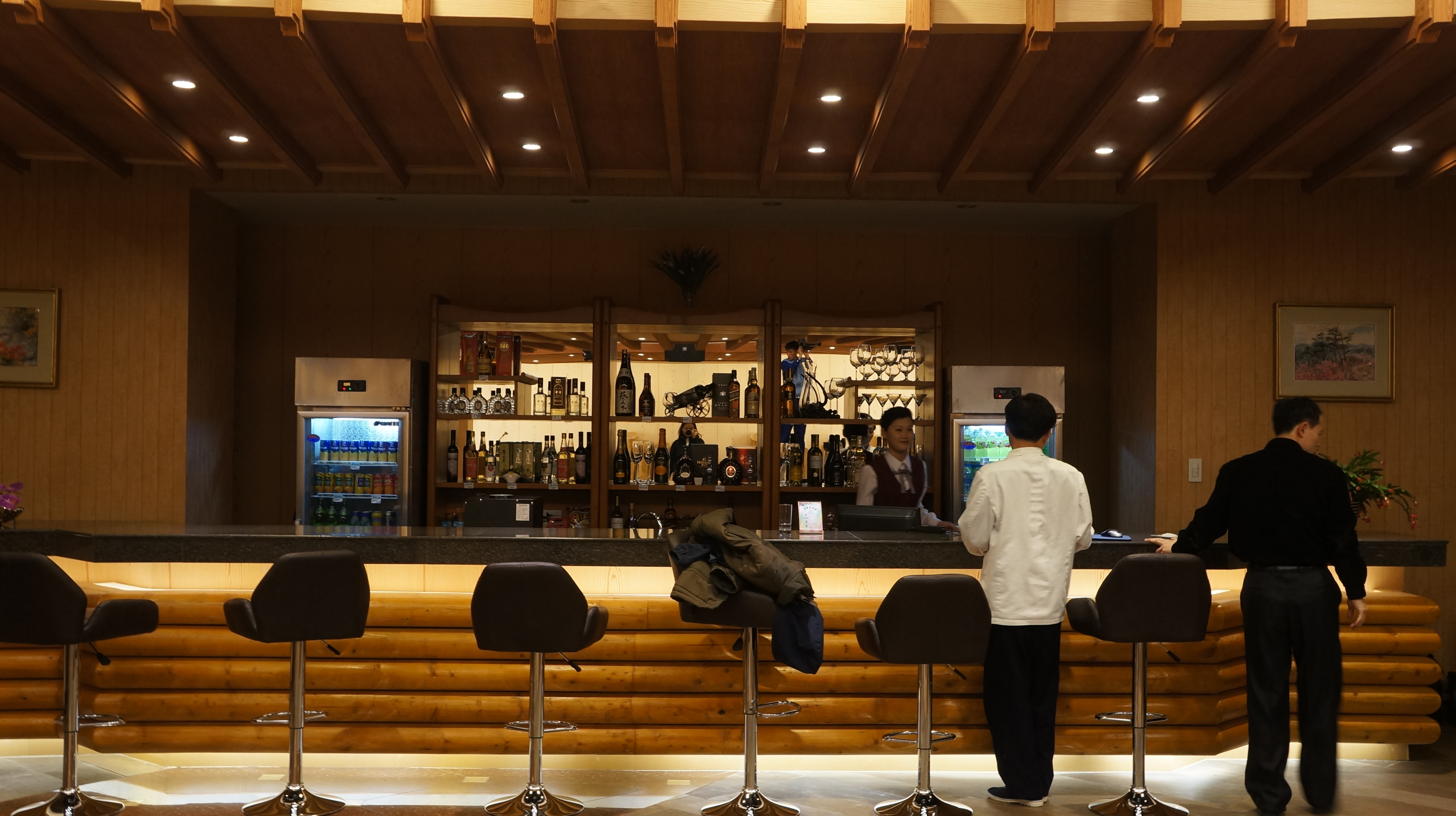
The karaoke room bar in the Masikryong Hotel, located at the Masikryong Ski Resort in North Korea

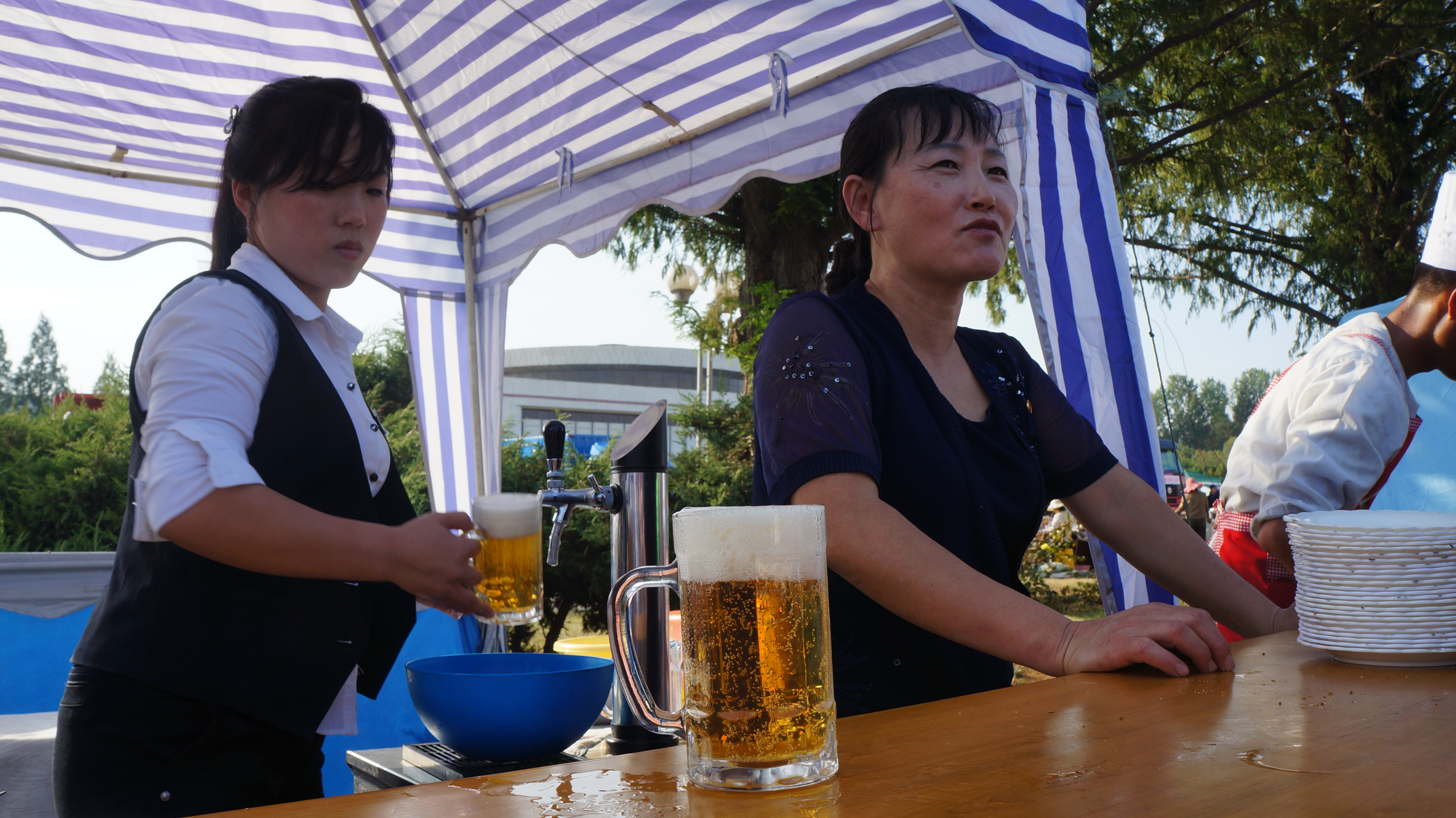
Street food vendors selling draft beer at the 10th Pyongyang Autumn International Trade Fair

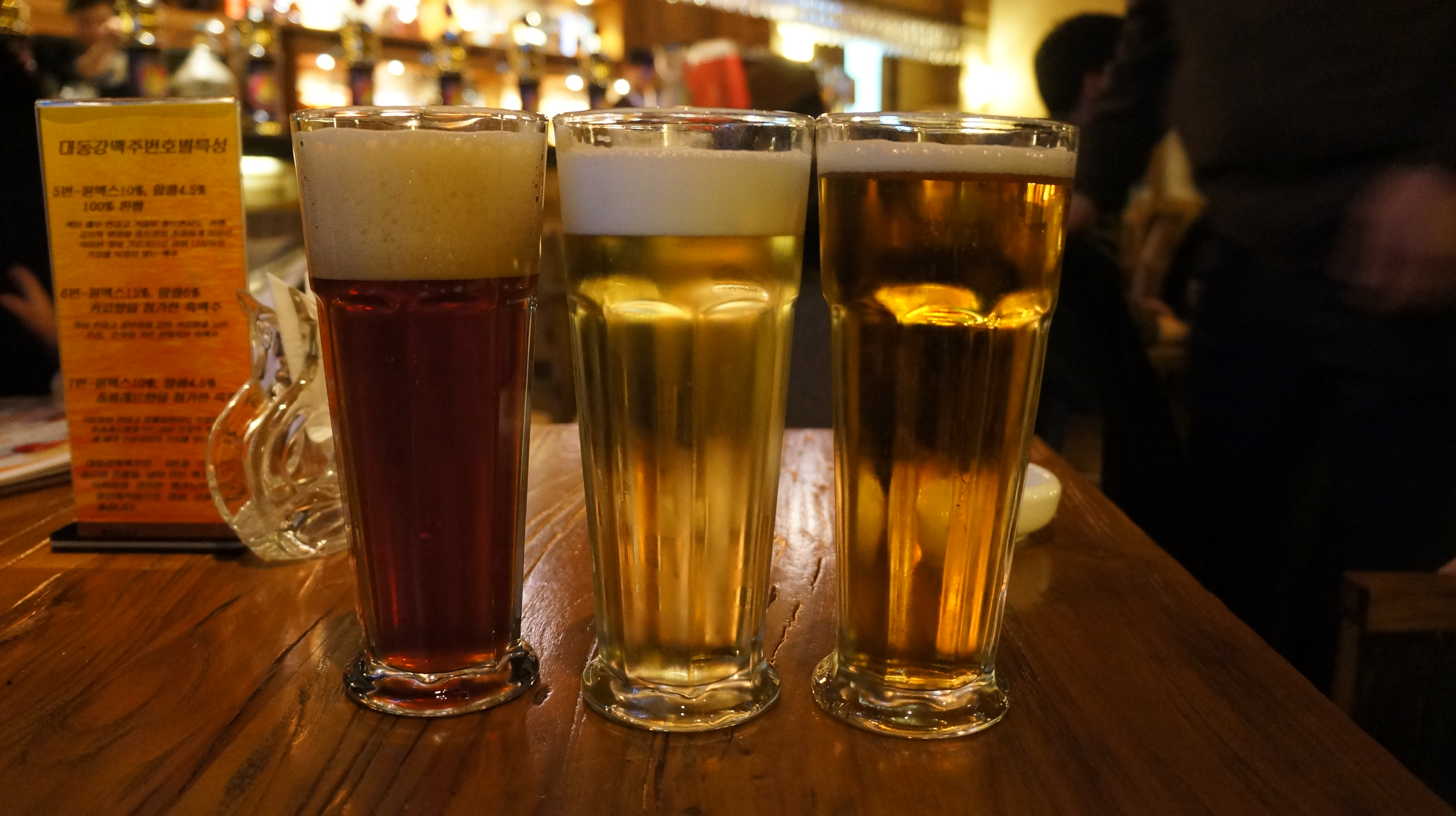
Craft beer at the Taedonggang Microbrewery No. 3 in Pyongyang, North Korea

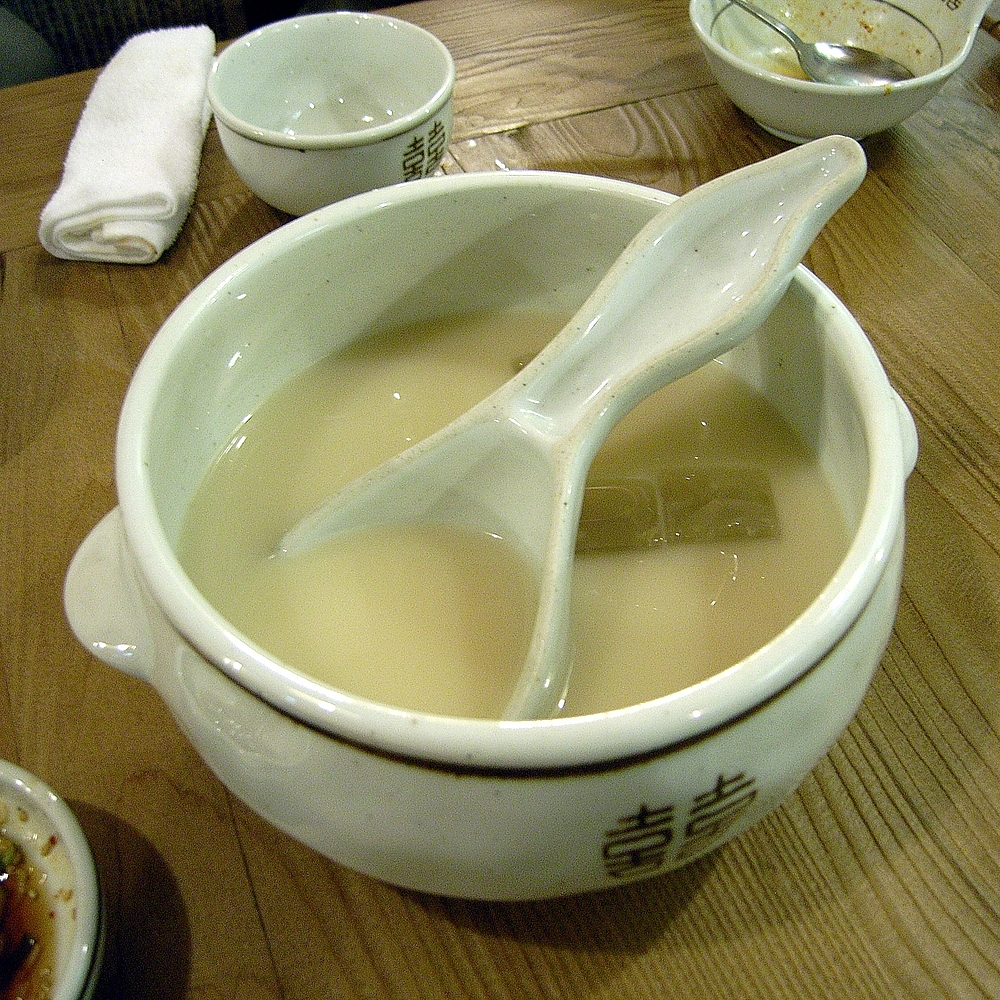
An example of makkŏlli

== See also ==
- Korean cuisine
  - Korean regional cuisine
    - Pyongyang § Cuisine
- List of Korean dishes
- List of Korean desserts
- List of Korean drinks
- North Korean famine
