= Michael Breen (author) =

British writer and journalist

- Born: 31 July 1963 (age 62); Aylesbury, United Kingdom
- Occupation: Writer

Michael Breen (born 31 July 1963) is an English author, consultant and journalist covering North and South Korea.

Breen writes occasional opinion columns for international and South Korean media. Since 2000, he has written a featured column for The Korea Times, an English-language daily in South Korea, where he comments on South Korean society, culture, and political issues.

== Career ==
Breen is a graduate of the University of Edinburgh and first began living in South Korea in 1982. He was the correspondent in Korea for The Guardian and the Washington Times. In 1987, he became the first non-Korean president of the Seoul Foreign Correspondents Club. In 1994, he became a management consultant specializing in North Korea, with clients such as Coca-Cola. He entered the public relations field in 1999 as the managing director of Merit/Burson-Marsteller, where he remained until 2004. He is the founder and CEO of Insight Communications Consultants, a Seoul-based public relations firm. Breen was made an honorary citizen of Seoul in 2001.

A former follower and biographer of the controversial Unification Church leader Sun Myung Moon, Breen was described in a 2005 American Prospect story as having brokered talks in the early 1990s between Moon and the North Korean leadership, laying groundwork for a visit by the staff of Moon's Washington Times. Breen has also authored an unauthorized biography of Moon, Sun Myung Moon: The Early Years.

On 25 December 2009, Breen wrote a satirical column in the paper which lampooned various South Korean public figures, including president Lee Myung-bak, singer Rain, and Samsung. Displeased with Breen's allusions to their corruption and arrogance, Samsung filed civil and criminal suits against him and the paper for libel. After an apology and after Breen told prosecutors during interrogation that the column was his own idea, the paper was dropped as a respondent, but the suit against Breen himself remained. One South Korean media outlet claimed that the entire column as an insult to the country of South Korea itself. Samsung dropped the civil suit after an apology by Breen. The criminal case went to trial but was thrown out by the judge on the grounds that there was "no victim."

== Published works ==
- Sun Myung Moon: The Early Years. Refuge Books, 1999.
- Kim Jong-Il: North Korea's Dear Leader. John Wiley and Sons, 2004. ISBN 978-0-470-82131-2.
- The Koreans: Who They Are, What They Want, Where Their Future Lies. St. Martin's Griffin, 2004.
- The New Koreans: The Story of a Nation. Thomas Dunne Books, 2017. ISBN 978-1250065056.
