= The Korea Times =

South Korean English-language newspaper

- Type: Daily newspaper
- Format: Print, online
- Owner(s): Hankook Ilbo, under Dongwha Enterprise
- Founder: Helen Kim
- Publisher: Oh Young-jin
- Editor: Kim Rahn
- Founded: November 1, 1950; 76 years ago
- Political alignment: Centre
- Language: English
- Headquarters: 14th Fl., Sejong-daero 17, Jung-gu, Seoul
- Country: South Korea
- ISSN: 0023-3935 (print); 1063-6412 (web)
- OCLC number: 42819972
- Website: koreatimes.co.kr

The Korea Times (Korean: 코리아타임스) is a comprehensive English-language daily newspaper published in South Korea. It was established on November 1, 1950, with the objective of delivering prompt domestic and international news to foreign troops participating as UN forces and promoting an understanding of Korea abroad. As the country's first English daily launched in 1950, it is characterized by balanced political coverage and a strong editorial section. On April 3, 2015, it became the first English-language newspaper in the nation to publish its 20,000th issue.

It is the oldest active daily English-language newspaper in South Korea. Since the late 1950s, it had been published by the Hankook Ilbo Media Group, but following an embezzlement scandal in 2013–2014 it was sold to Dongwha Enterprise in 2015. The president-publisher of The Korea Times is Oh Young-jin.

== Description ==
The newspaper's headquarters is located in the same building with Hankook Ilbo on Sejong-daero between Sungnyemun and Seoul Station in Seoul, South Korea.

The paper is not to be confused with The Korea Daily News, a 1904 to 1910 newspaper which briefly ran under the title Korea Times. It is also unrelated to another paper by Lee Myo-muk, Ha Kyong-tok and Kim Yong-ui in September 1945.

== History ==
The Korea Times was founded by Helen Kim five months into the Korean War (1950–1953). The first issue on November 1 was a two-page tabloid. It was printed six days a week, skipping Mondays, and cost 100 won. Kim set out to start the paper in 1949 when she became president of Ewha Womans University, and the initial editorial team came from Ewha's English literature professors.

Publication began in Seoul after United Nations forces retook Seoul following the Second Battle of Seoul but moved to Busan on January 3, 1951, during the Third Battle of Seoul, with members of the editorial staff leaving Seoul on the last train before Chinese forces took the capital. Prior to leaving the city, a group of five staffers went to Mugyo-dong for food and drink, where they were nearly shot by young South Korean military police who demanded to see their IDs and asked "Why do you all make a fuss with drinking in this emergency time?" Prior to evacuation, the paper's editorial office was in the fourth floor of the "fire-gutted" Capitol building, and printing was done at a shop in Bongnae-dong. Publication resumed after 15 days after relocating to Busan, the headlines were handwritten.

The paper maintained close relations with the Syngman Rhee administration, but began to criticize the president due to his interference in its publication. On April 23, 1954, the paper was acquired by Chang Key-young, then president of The Chosun Ilbo and later founder of the Hankook Ilbo.

On September 26, 1958, The Korea Times managing editor Choi Byung-woo died at age 34, becoming the first Korean war correspondent to die while on duty. A boat carrying Choi and other foreign correspondents covering the Communist Chinese bombing of the Nationalist-led Quemoy and Matsu islands capsized. The Korea Times and the Hankook Ilbo held a memorial service for Choi at Kyonggi High School, his alma mater, on October 11, 1958. The service was attended by hundreds of mourners. Choi was the main inspiration for the founding of the Kwanhun Club, a fraternity of senior journalists. Choi also played a leading role in the designation of April 7 as "Newspaper Day," which is observed by Korean journalists to this day.

On Tuesday, February 27, 1968, a fire completely gutted the main office of The Korea Times and its sister papers in Junghak-dong, Jongno-gu, downtown Seoul, killing seven workers and injuring three others. After the fire, The Korea Times managed to publish an abbreviated edition on February 28. During the restoration period, a number of readers and foreign organizations, including the American Embassy and the U.S. Operations Mission (a U.S. aid mission), either loaned or donated typewriters to The Korea Times. The newspaper took refuge in a nearby office in Chungmuro, where production was performed for years.

The paper published its first color image on Christmas Day 1968, showing a four-color picture of a YMCA choir singing a Christmas carol. It converted from hot metal typesetting to a Cold Type System of phototypesetting on its 34th anniversary on November 1, 1984.

Former Korean President Kim Dae-jung famously taught himself English by reading The Korea Times.

The Korea Times published the official Olympic newspaper named The Seoul Olympian for the 1988 Summer Olympics.

== Notable columns ==
In 1968, the "Thoughts of the Times" column debuted, providing column space for members of the community. The first column was by Helen Kim. Over the years, the column has produced highly controversial articles.

The column "Scouting the City" ran from 1964 to December 1974, covering numerous controversial topics and criticizing others, including the United States Forces Korea. Under the penname Alf Racketts, the column was really by newspaper staffer James Wade. The author Ahn Junghyo wrote a column in the 1960s and 1970s.

Notable columnists in recent years include retired Lt. Gen. Chun In-bum, Donald Kirk, Michael Breen and Mark A. Peterson. Detective novelist Martin Limón has also contributed a few articles.

== Controversy ==
Twice in history, The Korea Times managing editors have been detained over the "Thoughts of the Times" column. Managing editor Henry Chang published "Definition of a Gambler" under the penname "Hensync" on July 30, 1958, leading to his imprisonment for 16 days under sedition charges.

On June 11, 1973, Bernard Wideman wrote a satirical article in response to a Time article on Japanese tourists and kisaeng, he put forth outrageous proposals governing the control of women. In response, Orianna West, an American housewife living in Seoul, wrote a response piece calling for the subjugation and exploitation of Korean boys. In response, local newspapers reprinted translations of the satirical articles, criticizing the foreigners. Managing editor Chang Soon-il was taken to the intelligence authorities in response.

On December 25, 2009, columnist Michael Breen contributed a satirical column lampooning various South Korean public figures, including President Lee Myung-bak, singer Rain, and Samsung. The column imagined what public figures would want to send as Christmas gifts. He suggested Samsung would send pictures of Samsung Chairman Lee Kun-hee's son Lee Jae-yong with instructions to hang it next to the picture of the chairman, an allusion to North Korea's cult of personality. He also suggested the company would send Christmas cards to politicians, prosecutors and journalists with $50,000 gift certificates. Displeased with Breen's allusions to their corruption and arrogance, Samsung filed civil and criminal suits against him and the paper for libel. After an apology and after Breen told prosecutors during interrogation that the column was his own idea, the paper was dropped as a respondent, but the suit against Breen himself remained. One South Korean media outlet claimed that the entire column was an insult to the country of South Korea itself. Samsung dropped the civil suit after an apology by Breen. The criminal case went to trial but was thrown out by the judge on the grounds that there was "no victim."

On September 11, 2015, "The Thoughts of the Times" column published an article titled "Why won't you sit next to me on the subway?" It criticized Koreans for avoiding foreigners in public transport and exhibited unstable and aggressive traits in the writer. The article was quickly uncovered as a practical joke. Chief editorial writer Oh Young-jin apologized to readers, threatening law enforcement involvement in future cases, and pledging to keep the paper's open-door policy, inviting readers, professional or untrained, to contribute.

On June 2, 2017, then-managing editor Oh Young-jin published a contentious article titled "Holocaust vs. comfort women" in which he tried to answer which was worse: Nazi Germany's Holocaust or Imperial Japan's wartime sex slavery. On June 5 he published a selection of reader feedback, including one holocaust denier who claimed there were no gas chambers, and that any gassing done was to kill disease-carrying lice to protect the prisoners, saying "Gassing was a life-saving measure, not a homicidal one." On June 14, he published a letter from a German teacher titled "Holocaust happened" refuting the Holocaust denier and decrying the newspaper for publishing her claims.

The Korea Times has been criticized for republishing tabloid news, especially on cryptozoology and UFO sightings. It has reposted articles from Weekly World News and The Onion, including a widely spread article naming Kim Jong Un "The Onion's sexiest man alive" for 2012.

== Modern Korean Literature Translation Awards ==
The Korea Times established the Modern Korean Literature Translation Awards on its 20th anniversary in 1970, to lay the groundwork for promotion of Korean literature internationally and ultimately to produce a Nobel literature laureate from Korea.

Over the decades, it has awarded rising stars in Korean literature translation. Past winners include Sora Kim-Russell, Bruce Fulton who won three times for short story translations in 1985, 1987 and 1989, and Brother Anthony, who won the top prize for poetry in 1991 with his translation of "Headmaster Abe" by Ko Un. Brother Anthony later served on the judging panel for the awards from 1996 until 2023. Richard Rutt had also been a judge from 1970 to 1973, and Chang Wang-rok, who received commendation awards in 1970 and 1976, was judge between 1982 and 1988. The current three judges are Sora Kim-Russell, Krys Lee and Ji-Eun Lee.

== Other awards ==
The Korea Times also runs several other annual awards.

The Economic Essay Contest invites Korean and foreign university undergrad and grad students to contribute essays on economy-related topics. Winners receive cash prizes. Woori Bank is a sponsor.

The Global Korea Youth Awards were established in 2012 under the name Multicultural Youth Awards, in cooperation with the Ministry of Gender Equality and Family to encourage students from multicultural households.

== Other publications ==
The Korea Times published The Seoul Olympian in 1988, the official newspaper of the 1988 Summer Olympics.

== See also ==
- Communications in South Korea
- List of newspapers
