= The Koreans (band) =

1998–2004 English indie rock band

- Origin: London, England
- Genres: Indie rock
- Years active: 1998–2004
- Labels: Chlorine Records, Drowned in Sound, Storm Music
- Members: Oliver Hicks; Brent Newman; Rob Harwood; Chris Hill
- Website: www.thekoreans.com

The Koreans were an English four-piece indie rock band from London, England, active between 1998 and 2004. Their music has featured in the HBO television series Entourage, The O.C. and the Juiced video game soundtrack.

== Discography ==
=== Albums ===
- 65 Sutherland Square, 1999 released via Chlorine Records
- Dull Diamonds And Polished Stones, 2001 released via Chlorine Records
- Neon, 13 September 2004 released via Storm Music

=== EPs ===
- Slow Motion EP, 1998 released via Chlorine Records
- Listen Carefully..., 1999 released via Chlorine Records

=== Singles ===
- "Machine Code", 21 July 2003 released via Drowned in Sound
- "How Does It Feel", 1 December 2003 released via Drowned in Sound – BBC 6 Music Single of the Week
- "Still Strung Out", 9 August 2004 released via Storm Music – Virgin Radio Single of the Week
