= Chun In-bum =

South Korean Army officer

- 전인범
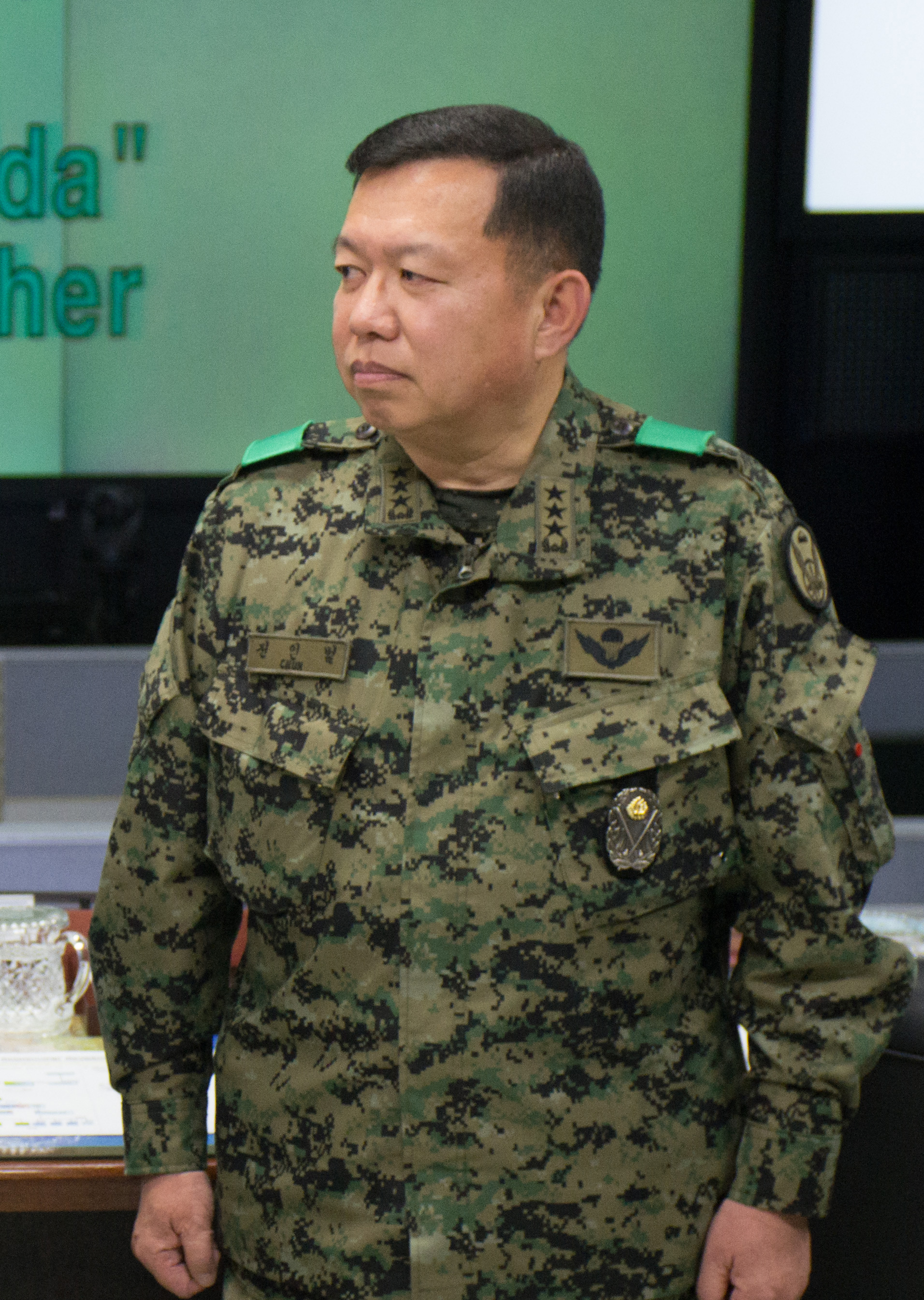
- Born: Chun In-bum; September 6, 1958 (age 68); Seoul
- Spouse: Shim Hwa-Jin
- Military career
- Allegiance: South Korea
- Branch: Republic of Korea Army
- Service years: 1981–2016
- Rank: Lieutenant General
- Commands: Republic of Korea Army Special Warfare Command

YouTube information
- Channel: 전인범장군
- Years active: 2012–present
- Genre: Military issues
- Subscribers: 74.3 thousand

Chun In-bum (born September 6, 1958) is a retired South Korean Army Lieutenant general and authority on Korean politics and military relations.

== Biography ==
=== Early life ===
Chun was born September 6, 1958, in the South Korean capital city of Seoul. He moved to the United States of America at the age of seven with his mother, who was serving as a South Korean diplomat, and spent four and a half years in New York City before returning to Korea in 1969 to finish high school. He was accepted to the Korea Military Academy (KMA) in 1977. There, he studied military history and was commissioned as an infantry officer in 1981 upon completion of his degree.

=== Later life and military service ===
Shortly after graduation, then-Lieutenant Chun was selected as an aide to Lieutenant General Lee Ki-baek, making him the youngest officer in the history of the army to be appointed aide to a three-star general. In October 1983, General Lee was nearly killed in a terrorist bombing in Rangoon and then-Lieutenant Chun was credited with saving Lee’s life in the aftermath of the attack. He was awarded the National Security Medal (Kwang-Bok) for his actions.

Chun continued his career by serving in the ROK/US Combined Forces Command (CFC) in 1988, the Korean Special Warfare Command (SWC) in 1990, and in the ROK Army Chief of Staff Office. From 1995 to 1997, he commanded a battalion in the 22nd ROK Infantry Division. After promotion to brigadier general he served in positions commanding 29th Infantry Regiment of the 9th Infantry Division of the Republic of Korea Army and helped direct elections in Iraq in 2005. For his service in Iraq he received the Hwa-Rang Combat medal and became the first Korean officer since the Vietnam War to be awarded the U.S. Bronze Star. Later in 2005, he served as the Director of U.S. Affairs at the Korean Ministry of National Defense.

In 2007, then Brigadier General Chun was deployed to Afghanistan in response to 2007 South Korean hostage crisis in Afghanistan. He was promoted to major general in 2009, and to lieutenant general in November 2013. He was assigned to head the ROK Special Warfare Command, for which he received U.S. Special Operations Command (USSOCOM) medal in 2016, becoming the first Korean to receive the honor.

In 2015, Chun was promoted to deputy commander for the First ROK Army (FROKA) and became a Distinguished Fellow of New Westminster College.

=== Retirement and Current Activities ===
Chun retired from active duty in July 2016. After his retirement he briefly worked for Moon Jae-in’s presidential campaign before stepping down to conduct fellowships with Brookings Institution’s Center for East Asia Policy Studies (CEAP) and the US-Korea Institute of the School of Advanced International Studies (SAIS) at Johns Hopkins University in Washington, D.C.

Chun has been a board member of the Korean Animal Welfare Association since 2018.

Chun regularly publishes op-eds on online publications such as The Korea Times, UPI, and Fox and Lion.

=== Personal life ===
Chun is married to Shim Hwa-jin, former president of Sung-Shin Women’s University. The couple have two sons.
