= The Koreans (book) =

1998 book by Michael Breen

- First edition
- Author: Michael Breen
- Language: English
- Genre: Non-fiction
- Publisher: Thomas Dunne Books
- Publication date: 1998
- Publication place: United Kingdom
- Media type: Print (Hardback & Paperback)
- Pages: 304
- ISBN: 0-312-24211-5

The Koreans: Who They Are, What They Want, Where Their Future Lies is a 1998 non-fiction book by British journalist Michael Breen. It was first published in 1998 by Thomas Dunne Books.

Later, Breen authored The New Koreans: The Story of a Nation.
