= 2011 Seoul mayoral by-election =

- 26 October 2011
- Turnout: 4,066,566 (48.56%)
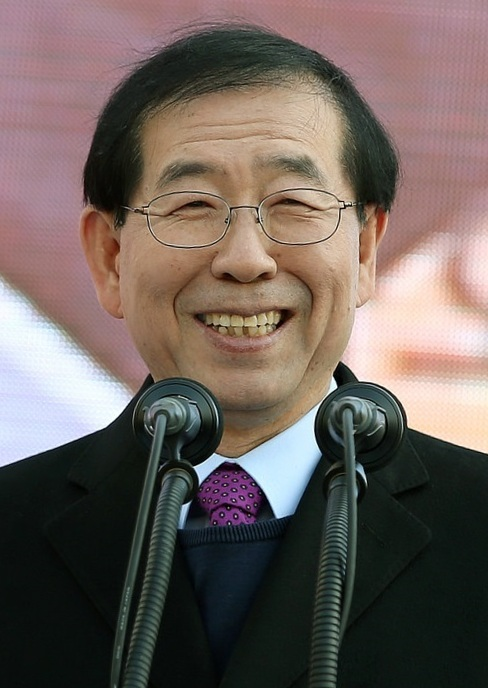

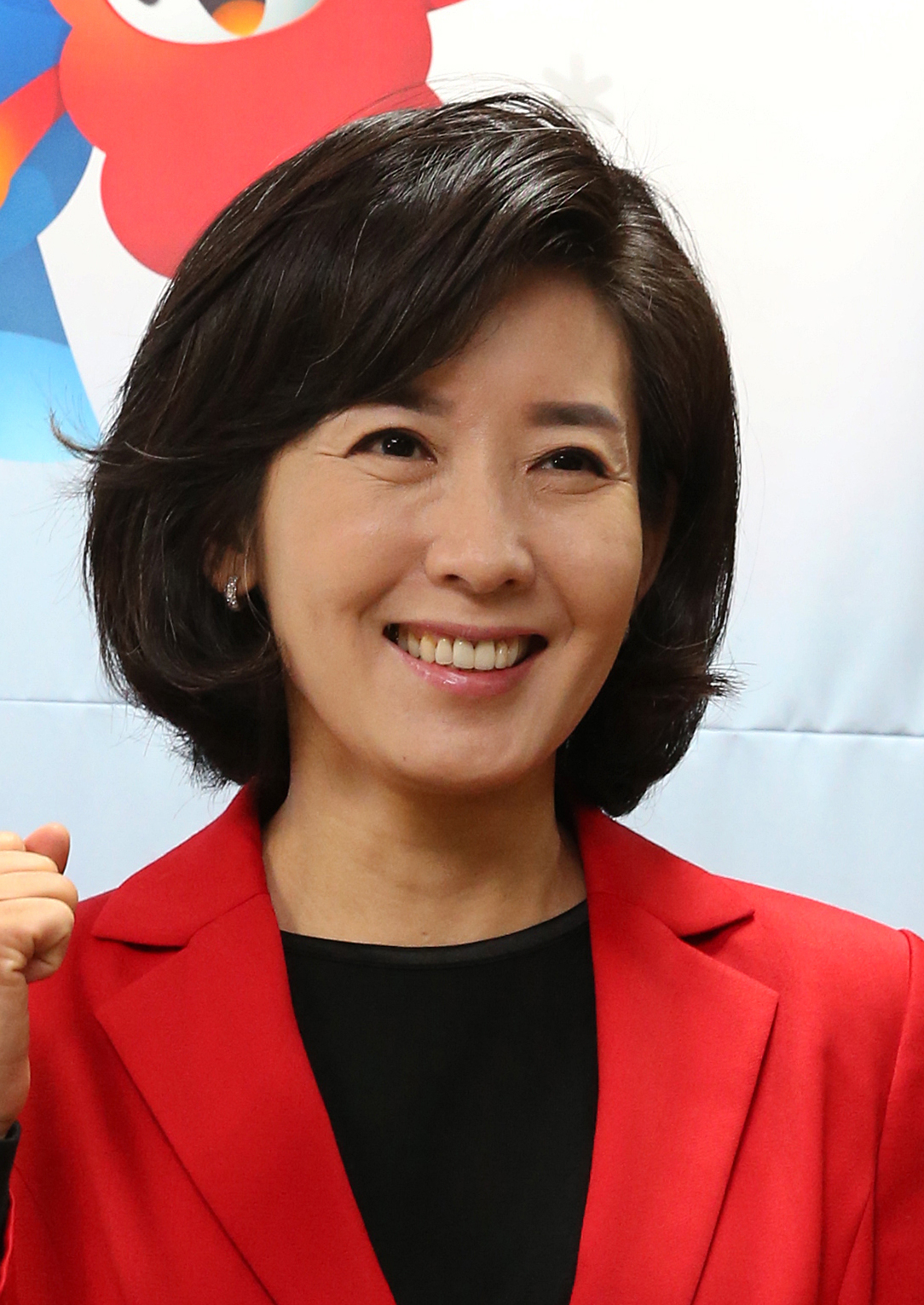
Candidate	Park Won-soon	Na Kyung-won
Party	Independent	Grand National
Popular vote	2,158,476	1,867,880
Percentage	53.40%	46.21%
Mayor before election
Oh Se-hoon
Grand National
Elected Mayor
Park Won-soon
Independent

The 2011 Seoul mayoral by-election was held on 26 October 2011 after Oh Se-hoon resigned due to his failure in the Seoul Free Lunch Referendum. It was part of the by-elections in 2011.

== Background ==
As the controversy over the free school lunch program has not subsided, Mayor of Seoul Oh Se-hoon proposed a local referendum to the Seoul Metropolitan Council to directly ask the citizens' opinions regarding the free school lunch program. But the Metropolitan Council rejected his proposal, finally under the leadership of Mayor Oh, it decided to hold a local referendum on the scope of free school lunch, and the vote was scheduled to take place on 24 August 2011.

On 21 August, Mayor Oh announced three days before the referendum that he would step down if he lost because of unachievable voter turnout not achieved or low approval ratings after counting.

In the referendum held on 24 August, it was not able to count the votes because it was less than the minimum turnout rate of 33.3%. This has raised interest in the timing of Oh's resignation, because the by-election date will vary depending on his resignation date. If he resigns after 30 September 2011, the mayoral by-election will take with the legislative election on 11 April 2012. So the Grand National Party called for him to resign in October 2011. However, Mayor Oh announced his resignation on 26 August.

== Selection of candidates ==
=== Grand National Party ===
Na Kyung-won was the only candidate in the Grand National Party to run alone. Other candidates initially ran, but withdrew.

=== Pan-opposition ===
The candidate who received the highest support in pan-opposition was Ahn Cheol-soo. However, he was on 6 September 2011, expressed its endorsement of Park Won-soon, a lawyer.

On 3 October 2011, pan-opposition primary were held to claimed unification of opposition candidates. In this primary, Park Won-soon was elected as the single candidate for the pan-opposition bloc by defeating Park Young-sun of the Democratic Party and Choi Kyu-youp of the Democratic Labor Party.

== Final candidates ==
- Na Kyung-won, member of the National Assembly. (Grand National Party)
- Bae Il-do, former member of the National Assembly. (Independent)
- Park Won-soon, a lawyer. (Independent)

== Results ==
Candidate	Party	Votes	%
Park Won-soon	Independent (DP, DLP)	2,158,476	53.40
Na Kyung-won	Grand National Party	1,867,880	46.21
Bae Il-do	Independent	15,408	0.38
Total		4,041,764	100.00
Valid votes		4,041,764	99.39
Invalid/blank votes		24,793	0.61
Total votes		4,066,557	100.00
Registered voters/turnout		8,374,067	48.56

=== By district ===
Districts	Na Kyung-won GNP		Bae Il-do Ind.		Park Won-soon Ind.		Total votes
Districts	Votes	%	Votes	%	Votes	%	Total votes
Jongno District	31,926	45.63	277	0.40	37,770	53.98	69,973
Jung District	26,564	47.66	210	0.38	28,965	51.97	55,739
Yongsan District	50,847	51.83	338	0.35	46,923	47.83	98,108
Seongdong District	54,059	45.33	435	0.37	64,766	54.31	119,260
Gwangjin District	63,128	43.81	514	0.36	80,449	55.83	144,091
Dongdaemun District	65,140	45.24	614	0.43	78,221	54.33	143,975
Jungnang District	68,501	44.76	676	0.44	83,870	54.80	153,047
Seongbuk District	81,902	42.74	743	0.39	108,976	56.87	191,621
Gangbuk District	54,531	42.57	555	0.43	72,981	56.97	128,097
Dobong District	64,110	44.88	567	0.40	78,179	54.73	142,856
Nowon District	104,251	44.08	955	0.40	131,293	55.52	236,499
Eunpyeong District	78,252	42.65	712	0.39	104,533	56.97	183,497
Seodaemun District	55,181	43.04	495	0.39	72,542	56.58	128,218
Mapo District	67,297	42.01	511	0.32	92,375	57.67	160,183
Yangcheon District	89,227	45.98	1,052	0.54	103,780	53.48	194,059
Gangseo District	95,934	44.14	874	0.40	120,537	55.46	217,345
Guro District	71,850	43.15	646	0.39	94,015	56.46	166,511
Geumcheon District	36,194	41.12	402	0.46	51,418	58.42	88,014
Yeongdeungpo District	73,833	46.01	567	0.35	86,069	53.64	160,469
Dongjak District	73,341	43.60	583	0.35	94,283	56.05	168,207
Gwanak District	78,473	36.86	857	0.40	133,587	62.74	212,917
Seocho District	111,014	60.12	488	0.26	73,139	39.61	184,641
Gangnam District	140,109	61.33	672	0.29	87,657	38.37	228,438
Songpa District	140,183	51.12	947	0.35	133,087	48.53	274,217
Gangdong District	92,033	47.98	718	0.37	99,061	51.65	191,812
Total	1,867,880	46.21	15,408	0.38	2,158,476	53.41	4,041,764
