= 2014 Seoul mayoral election =

Election in Korea

← 2011	4 June 2014	2018 →
- Turnout: 4,948,897 (58.63%)
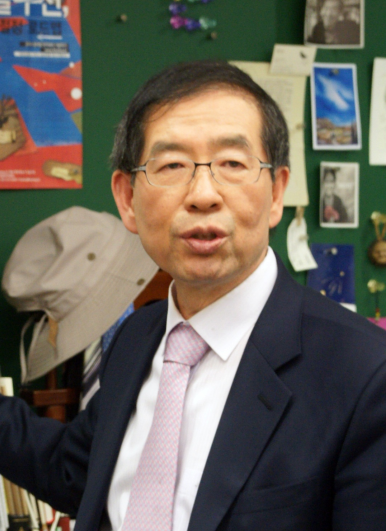

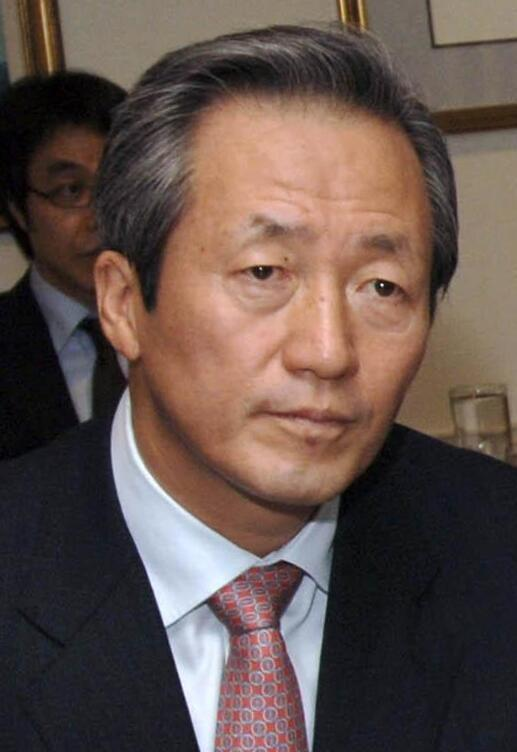
Candidate	Park Won-soon	Chung Mong-joon
Party	NPAD	Saenuri
Popular vote	2,752,171	2,109,869
Percentage	56.12%	43.02%
Mayor before election
Park Won-soon
NPAD
Elected Mayor
Park Won-soon
NPAD

The 2014 Seoul mayoral election was held on 4 June 2014 as part of the 6th local elections.

== Selection of candidates ==
=== Saenuri Party ===
2014 Saenuri Party Seoul mayoral primary results
Candidate	Place	Votes	Percentage
Chung Mong-joon	Nominated	3,198	71.1%
Kim Hwang-sik	2nd	958	21.3%
Lee Hye-hoon	3rd	342	7.6%
		4,498	100%

=== New Politics Alliance for Democracy ===
2014 NPAD Seoul mayoral primary results
Candidate	Place	Votes	Percentage
Park Won-soon	Nominated	Walkover	

=== Unified Progressive Party ===
2014 Unified Progressive Party Seoul mayoral primary results
Candidate	Place	Votes	Percentage
Chung Tae-heung	Nominated	Walkover	

== Final candidates ==
Name	Age	Party	Notes
Chung Mong-joon	62	Saenuri Party	Chairman of Hyundai Heavy Industries (former); President of the Korea Football Association (1993–2009); Vice President of the FIFA (1994–2011); Chairman of the Grand National Party (2009–2010)
Park Won-soon	58	New Politics Alliance for Democracy	Lawyer (former); Mayor of Seoul (2011–present)
Chung Tae-heung	42	Unified Progressive Party	
Hong Jung-shik	63	New Politics Party	

== Results ==
=== Summary ===
2014 Seoul mayoral election
Party	Candidate	Votes	%
NPAD	Park Won-soon	2,752,171	56.12
Saenuri	Chung Mong-joon	2,109,869	43.02
Unified Progressive	Chung Tae-heung	23,638	0.48
New Politics	Hong Jung-shik	17,603	0.35
Total votes		4,903,281	100.00
Rejected ballots		45,616	–
Turnout		4,948,897	58.63
Registered electors		8,441,594	

=== By districts ===
Districts	Chung Mong-joon Saenuri		Park Won-soon NPAD		Chung Tae-heung UPP		Hong Jung-shik NPP		Total votes
Districts	Votes	%	Votes	%	Votes	%	Votes	%	Total votes
Jongno District	34,599	43.14	45,020	56.14	330	0.41	238	0.29	80,187
Jung District	28,273	43.84	35,662	55.30	291	0.45	262	0.40	64,488
Yongsan District	58,479	49.93	57,807	49.36	462	0.39	365	0.31	117,113
Seongdong District	62,376	42.93	81,645	56.19	715	0.49	546	0.37	145,282
Gwangjin District	72,160	40.99	102,449	58.19	832	0.47	592	0.33	176,033
Dongdaemun District	76,325	43.00	99,568	56.09	910	0.51	684	0.38	177,487
Jungnang District	80,700	43.05	104,905	55.96	1,050	0.56	786	0.41	187,441
Seongbuk District	92,897	40.95	131,919	58.15	1,187	0.52	844	0.37	226,847
Gangbuk District	64,944	42.25	87,128	56.69	927	0.60	693	0.45	153,692
Dobong District	75,252	43.86	94,590	55.13	978	0.57	726	0.42	171,546
Nowon District	115,716	41.06	163,418	57.98	1,598	0.56	1,076	0.38	281,808
Eunpyeong District	93,022	40.14	136,656	58.97	1,252	0.54	789	0.34	231,719
Seodaemun District	64,341	40.66	92,500	58.46	754	0.47	609	0.38	158,204
Mapo District	74,548	38.52	117,343	60.63	935	0.48	695	0.35	193,521
Yangcheon District	97,435	41.54	135,186	57.63	1,126	0.48	808	0.34	234,555
Gangseo District	111,451	41.07	157,382	58.00	1,390	0.51	1,097	0.40	271,320
Guro District	85,806	40.70	123,139	58.41	1,025	0.48	819	0.38	166,511
Geumcheon District	45,315	40.29	66,005	58.68	669	0.59	478	0.42	112,467
Yeongdeungpo District	82,509	42.89	108,244	56.26	905	0.47	714	0.37	160,469
Dongjak District	87,813	41.35	122,927	57.89	854	0.40	720	0.33	212,314
Gwanak District	91,832	35.67	163,100	63.36	1,527	0.59	947	0.36	257,406
Seocho District	114,462	52.25	103,328	47.17	689	0.31	552	0.25	219,031
Gangnam District	145,512	54.32	120,645	45.04	877	0.32	809	0.30	267,843
Songpa District	150,228	45.88	174,892	53.41	1,323	0.40	987	0.30	327,430
Gangdong District	103,874	44.69	126,713	54.52	1,032	0.44	767	0.33	191,812
Total	2,109,869	43.02	2,752,171	56.12	23,638	0.48	17,603	0.35	4,903,281
