= Kwon Chil-seung =

South Korean politician (born 1965)

- 권칠승
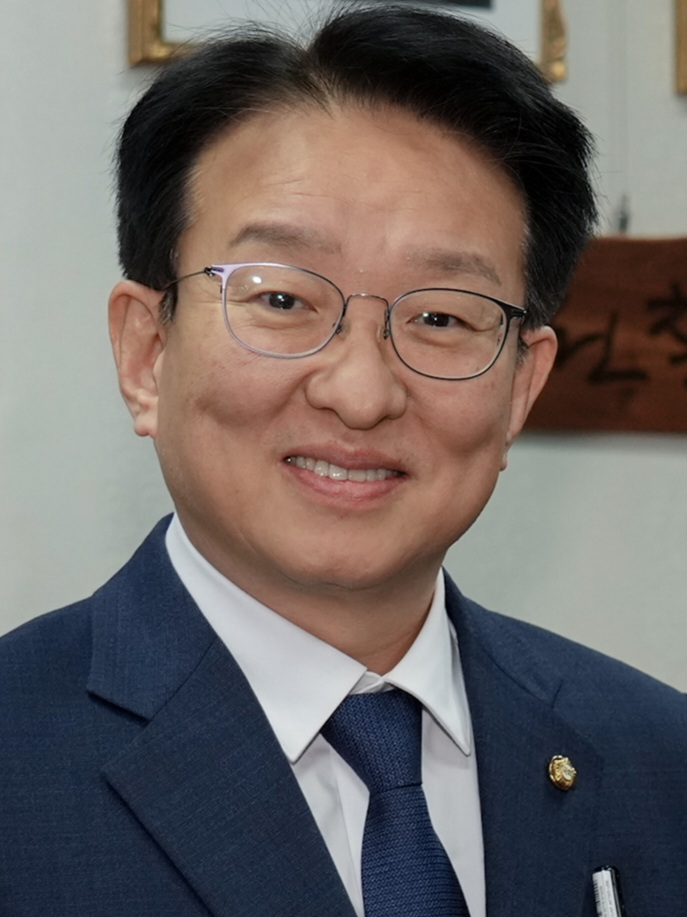

Minister of SMEs and Startups
- In office 5 February 2021 – 12 May 2022
- President: Moon Jae-in; Yoon Suk Yeol
- Prime Minister: Chung Sye-kyun; Hong Nam-ki (acting); Kim Boo-kyum; Choo Kyung-ho (acting)
- Preceded by: Park Young-sun
- Succeeded by: Lee Young

Member of the National Assembly
- Incumbent
- Assumed office 30 May 2016
- Preceded by: Suh Chung-won (Hwaseong A, Gyeonggi); Lee Won-wook (Hwaseong B, Gyeonggi)
- Constituency: Gyeonggi Hwaseong C

Personal details
- Born: 18 November 1965 (age 60) Yeongcheon, South Korea
- Party: Democratic
- Education: Korea University

Kwon Chil-seung (Korean: 권칠승; Hanja: 權七勝; born 18 November 1965) is a South Korean politician who served as Minister of SMEs and Startups from 2021 to 2022. Kwon has represented Hwaseong at the National Assembly from 2016 and previously at Gyeonggi Assembly from 2010 to 2016.

In January 2021, President Moon Jae-in nominated Kwon as his third Minister of SMEs and Startups as his second minister Park Young-sun announced her campaign for Seoul mayor in the upcoming bi-election.

Kwon is best known to the public for his bill which removes licenses of doctors convicted of serious crimes such as murder and sexual assault.

From 2004 to 2008 Kwon worked as an administrator at the Office of Senior Secretary for Civil Affairs to President Roh Moo-hyun working with Moon who led the Office from 2005 to 2006.

Kwon holds a bachelor's degree in economics from Korea University.

== Electoral history ==
| Election | Year | Post | Party affiliation | Votes | Percentage of votes | Results |
|---|---|---|---|---|---|---|
| 5th Local Election | 2010 | Member of Gyeonggi Assembly from Hwaseong 3rd | Democratic Party (2008) | 23,229 | 45.81% | Won |
| 6th Local Election | 2014 | Member of Gyeonggi Assembly from Hwaseong 3rd | New Politics Alliance for Democracy | 29,176 | 52.66% | Won |
| 20th General Election | 2016 | Member of National Assembly from Gyeonggi Hwaseong C | Democratic Party (2015) | 45,777 | 50.67% | Won |
| 21st General Election | 2020 | Member of National Assembly from Gyeonggi Hwaseong C | Democratic Party (2015) | 88,793 | 64.45% | Won |
| 22nd General Election | 2024 | Member of National Assembly from Gyeonggi Hwaseong C | Democratic Party (2015) | 80,110 | 61.53% | Won |
