= Chong Won-o =

South Korean politician (born 1968)

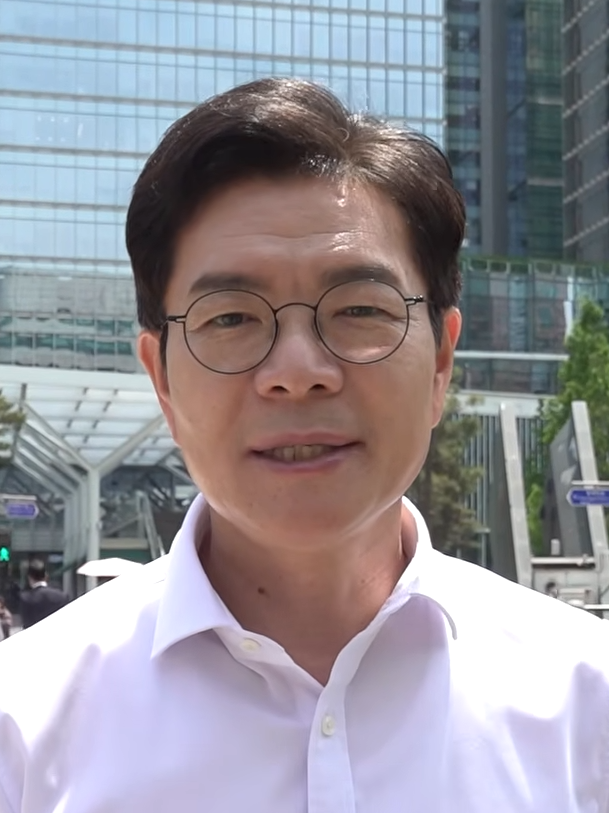
- Born: 12 August 1968 (age 58)

Korean name
- Hangul: 정원오
- RR: Jeong Wono
- MR: Chŏng Wŏno

Chong Won-o (Korean: 정원오; born 12 August 1968) is a South Korean politician. He is a member of the Democratic Party.

Chong ran to be Mayor of Seoul in the 2026 local elections, but narrowly lost to People Power Party opponent and incumbent mayor Oh Se-hoon.

== Education ==
- B.A. in Economics, College of Economics, University of Seoul
- M.A. in Social Welfare, Graduate School of Public Policy, Hanyang University
- Completed doctoral coursework in Urban Development and Management, Graduate School of Urban Studies, Hanyang University

== Election results ==
=== Local elections ===
==== Mayor of Seoul ====
Year	Elections	Constituency	Political party	Votes (%)	Remarks
2026	9th Iocal Election	Seoul (Mayoral Elections)	Democratic	2,515,560 (48.07%)	Defeated (2nd)

==== Mayor of Seoul Seongdong ====
Year	Elections	Constituency	Political party	Votes (%)	Results
2014	6th Iocal Election	Mayor of Seoul Seongdong	NPAD	72,188 (50.02%)	Won
2018	7th Iocal Election	Mayor of Seoul Seongdong	Democratic	107,970 (69.46%)	Won
2022	8th Iocal Election	Mayor of Seoul Seongdong	Democratic	79,786 (57.60%)	Won
