= 2010 Seoul mayoral election =

South Korena local election

← 2006	2 June 2010	2011 →
- Turnout: 4,426,182 (53.90%)
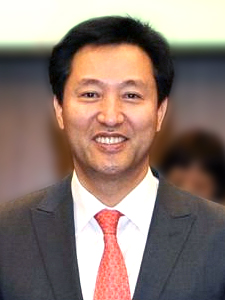

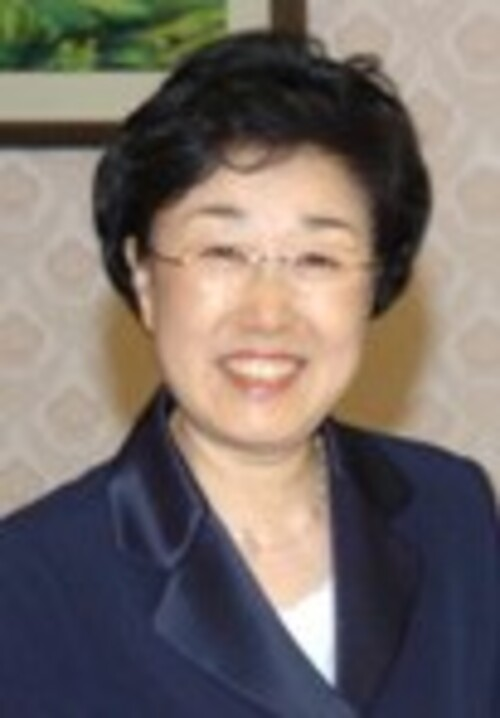
Candidate	Oh Se-hoon	Han Myeong-sook
Party	Grand National	Democratic
Popular vote	2,086,127	2,059,715
Percentage	47.43%	46.83%
Mayor before election
Oh Se-hoon
Grand National
Elected Mayor
Oh Se-hoon
Grand National

The 2010 Seoul mayoral election was held on 2 June 2010 as part of the 5th local elections.

== Selection of candidates ==
=== Grand National Party ===
2010 Grand National Party Seoul mayoral primary results
Candidate	Place	Results
Oh Se-hoon	Nominated	68.40%
Na Kyung-won	2nd	24.88%
Kim Choong-whan	3rd	6.72%
		100%

=== Democratic Party ===
2010 Democratic Party Seoul mayoral primary results
Candidate	Place	Results
Han Myeong-sook	Nominated	Results not released
Lee Kye-ahn	2nd	Results not released
		100%

=== Liberty Forward Party ===
2010 Liberty Forward Party Seoul mayoral primary results
Candidate	Place	Results
Ji Sang-wook	Nominated	Walkover

=== New Progressive Party ===
2018 New Progressive Party Seoul mayoral primary results
Candidate	Place	Results
Roh Hoe-chan	Nominated	Walkover

== Final candidates ==
Name	Age	Party	Notes
Oh Se-hoon	49	Grand National Party	Member of the National Assembly (2000–2004); Mayor of Seoul (2006–present)
Han Myeong-sook	66	Democratic Party	Minister of Gender Equality (2001–2003); Minister of Environment (2003–2004); Prime Minister of South Korea (2006–2007)
Ji Sang-wook	45	Liberty Forward Party	
Roh Hoe-chan	53	New Progressive Party	Member of the National Assembly (2004–2008); Leader of the New Progressive Party (2008–present)
Seok Jong-hyun	66	Future Union	

== Results ==
=== Summary ===
2010 Seoul mayoral election
Party	Candidate	Votes	%
Grand National	Oh Se-hoon	2,086,127	47.43
Democratic	Han Myeong-sook	2,059,715	46.83
New Progressive	Roh Hoe-chan	143,459	3.26
Liberty Forward	Ji Sang-wook	90,032	2.04
Future Union	Seok Jong-hyun	18,339	0.41
Total votes		4,397,672	100.00
Rejected ballots		28,510	–
Turnout		4,426,182	53.90
Registered electors		8,211,461	

=== By districts ===
Districts	Oh Se-hoon GNP		Han Myeong-sook DP		Ji Sang-wook LFP		Roh Hoe-chan NPP		Seok Jong-hyun Future Union		Total votes
Districts	Votes	%	Votes	%	Votes	%	Votes	%	Votes	%	Total votes
Jongno District	35,476	46.04	36,910	47.90	1,719	2.23	2,653	3.44	288	0.37	77,046
Jung District	28,648	47.55	28,410	47.16	1,198	1.98	1,618	2.68	363	0.60	60,237
Yongsan District	53,285	51.15	44,706	42.91	2,533	2.43	3,160	3.03	480	0.46	104,164
Seongdong District	63,448	47.22	63,966	47.60	2,534	1.88	3,891	2.89	526	0.39	134,365
Gwangjin District	72,749	46.08	76,420	48.41	3,089	1.95	4,878	3.09	707	0.44	157,843
Dongdaemun District	74,536	46.77	76,032	47.71	3,272	2.05	4,759	2.98	738	0.46	159,337
Jungnang District	80,577	47.13	81,517	47.68	3,432	2.00	4,757	2.78	670	0.39	170,953
Seongbuk District	91,907	45.19	99,316	48.83	4,093	2.01	7,236	3.55	808	0.39	203,360
Gangbuk District	63,231	44.84	70,115	49.72	2,553	1.81	4,539	3.21	569	0.40	141,007
Dobong District	74,594	46.98	74,789	47.10	3,224	2.03	5,400	3.40	766	0.48	158,773
Nowon District	119,567	45.58	124,603	47.50	4,973	1.89	12,126	4.62	1,049	0.39	262,318
Eunpyeong District	85,737	44.77	95,666	49.95	3,807	1.98	5,493	2.86	798	0.41	191,501
Seodaemun District	64,769	44.42	72,788	49.92	2,966	2.03	4,697	3.22	581	0.39	145,801
Mapo District	75,267	43.79	85,882	49.97	3,340	1.94	6,739	3.92	627	0.36	171,855
Yangcheon District	101,350	47.47	100,272	46.96	4,376	2.04	6,492	3.04	996	0.46	213,486
Gangseo District	111,082	46.05	116,689	48.37	5,121	2.12	7,315	3.03	1,010	0.41	241,217
Guro District	83,846	44.85	92,666	49.57	3,878	2.07	5,715	3.05	803	0.42	186,908
Geumcheon District	44,702	43.45	52,451	50.99	2,533	2.46	2,763	2.68	415	0.40	102,864
Yeongdeungpo District	84,999	47.45	83,982	46.88	3,683	2.05	5,577	3.11	879	0.49	179,120
Dongjak District	81,914	44.72	90,859	49.60	3,610	1.97	6,126	3.34	646	0.35	183,155
Gwanak District	93,184	39.34	128,444	54.23	4,841	2.04	9,497	4.01	851	0.35	236,817
Seocho District	109,446	59.07	65,626	35.41	3,738	2.01	5,762	3.10	709	0.38	185,281
Gangnam District	138,390	59.94	79,094	34.26	5,136	2.22	7,252	3.14	977	0.42	230,849
Songpa District	149,228	51.28	125,414	43.09	6,239	2.14	8,861	3.04	1,250	0.42	290,992
Gangdong District	104,195	49.99	93,098	44.66	4,144	1.98	6,153	2.95	833	0.39	208,423
Total	2,086,127	47.43	2,059,715	46.83	90,032	2.04	143,459	3.26	18,339	0.41	4,397,672
