= Hong Jong-hak =

South Korean politician

- 홍종학
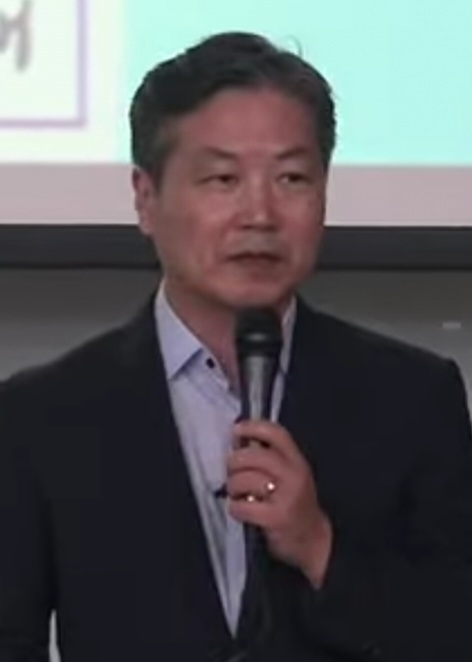

Minister of SMEs and Startups
- In office 21 November 2017 – 8 April 2019
- President: Moon Jae-in
- Prime Minister: Lee Nak-yeon
- Preceded by: Position established
- Succeeded by: Park Young-sun

Member of the National Assembly
- In office 30 May 2012 – 29 May 2016
- Constituency: Proportional representation

Personal details
- Born: 12 May 1959 (age 67) Incheon, South Korea
- Party: Democratic
- Education: Yonsei University; UC San Diego

Korean name
- Hangul: 홍종학
- Hanja: 洪鍾學
- RR: Hong Jonghak
- MR: Hong Chonghak

Hong Jong-hak (Korean: 홍종학; born 12 May 1959) is an emeritus professor of economics at Gachon University previously served as President Moon Jae-in's first Minister of SMEs and Startups.

For the 2012 general election, he left Gachon University where he first started his teaching career in 1992 as a lecturer. As a parliamentarian, he took numerous roles in his party and its succeeding parties including one of its senior role, Chair of the Policy Planning Committee.

After announcing that he will not seek for re-election, he joined then-candidate Moon's presidential campaign.

He previously hosted radio show explaining economic issues at MBC Radio.

He holds three degrees in economics - a bachelor and master's from Yonsei University and a doctorate from University of California, San Diego.

== Electoral history ==
Election	Year	District	Party affiliation	Votes	Percentage of votes	Results
19th National Assembly General Election	2012	Proportional representation	Democratic United Party	7,777,123	36.45%	Won
