= Oh Young-ju =

South Korean politician (born 1964)

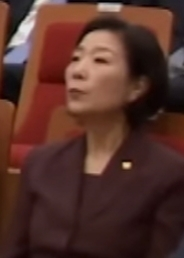
- Oh in 2025

Minister of SMEs and Startups
- In office December 2023 – July 2025
- President: Yoon Suk Yeol
- Preceded by: Lee Young
- Succeeded by: Han Seong-sook

South Korean Ambassador to Vietnam
- In office October 2022 – July 2023

South Korean Deputy Permanent Representative to the United Nations
- In office August 2015 – June 2017

Personal details
- Born: March 27, 1964 (age 62) Masan, South Korea
- Education: Ewha Womans University; University of California, San Diego

Oh Young-ju (Korean: 오영주; born March 27, 1964) is a South Korean politician and diplomat who served as the minister of SMEs and startups from 2023 to 2025. She also held office as the ambassador to Vietnam from 2022 to 2023 and as the deputy permanent representative to the United Nations from 2015 to 2017.

== Biography ==
Oh was born on March 27, 1964 in Masan, South Korea. She gained a bachelor's degree from Ewha Womans University in 1986 and a master's degree from the University of California, San Diego.

From February 1998 to March 1999, Deputy Secretary to the South Korean Mission to the United Nations. From March 1999 to September 2000, Oh was the Secretary to the South Korean Mission to the United Nations.

From August 2015 to June 2017, Oh was the South Korean Deputy Permanent Representative to the United Nations. From October 2019 to October 2024, Oh was a member of the Board of Trustees of the United Nations Interregional Crime and Justice Research Institute. From October 2022 to July 2023, she was the South Korean ambassador to Vietnam. In December 2023, Oh became the Minister of SMEs and Startups.
