= Youn Kun-young =

South Korean politician (born 1969)

- 윤건영
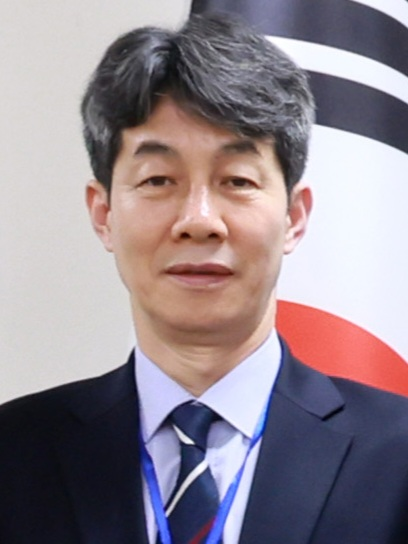

Member of the National Assembly
- Incumbent
- Assumed office 30 May 2020
- Preceded by: Park Young-sun
- Constituency: Seoul Guro B

Secretary to the President for State Affairs Planning
- In office May 2017 – 6 January 2020
- President: Moon Jae-in
- Preceded by: Position established
- Succeeded by: Lee Jin-seok

Secretary to the President for Political Affairs Planning
- In office March 2003 – February 2008
- President: Roh Moo-hyun

Personal details
- Born: 26 September 1969 (age 57) Busan, South Korea
- Party: Democratic
- Education: Kookmin University

Youn Kun-young (Korean: 윤건영; Hanja: 尹建永; 26 September 1969), also known as Yun Kun-young, is a South Korean politician representing Guro District of Seoul at the National Assembly starting from 2020. He previously served as state affairs secretary to President Moon Jae-in.

Minister of SMEs and Startups Park Young-sun, who served as Guro District B constituency representative since 2008, announced she will not seek for re-election. He then resigned from post at the Office of the President in January 2020. As many suspected, He ran for Park's constituency in the 2020 general election.

Youn holds two degrees from Kookmin University - a bachelor's in commerce and a master's in economics.

== Electoral history ==
Election	Year	Post	Party affiliation	Votes	Percentage of votes	Results
2nd Local Election	1998	Member of Seoul Seongbuk District Council	Independent	1,964	63.23%	Won
3rd Iocal Election	2002	Member of Seoul Seongbuk District Council	Independent	6,114	15.18%	Lost (3rd)
21st General Election	2020	Member of National Assembly from Seoul Guro B	Democratic Party	56,065	57.04%	Won
22nd General Election	2024	Member of National Assembly from Seoul Guro B	Democratic Party	57,788	59.86%	Won
