= Referendums in South Korea =

Referendums in South Korea have been held at the national and local level. All of the 6 national referendums that have been held in South Korea were on presidential power.

== Background ==
The Referendum Act allows people to vote directly on certain state affairs. Referendums are required to be held before constitutional amendments. Referendums on national defense, national destiny, and unification can be held with the approval of the president. All of the 6 national referendums that have been held were on presidential power.

== History ==
In 1962, the fifth constitutional amendment, which turned the country into a presidential system and turning the National Assembly into a unicameral legislature, was ratified with a 78.78% vote. In 1969, a referendum ratified a new constitutional amendment by referendum that eventually allowed president Park Chung Hee to obtain a third term. The amendment was referred to as a second coup by the opposition.

In 1972, a referendum that amended the constitution to allow Park to run for an unlimited amount of terms was ratified with a 94% vote in favor of the amendment. 91% of eligible voters turned out to vote on the referendum. The National Election Commission had been given the responsibility of distributing instructions and information related to the referendum.

On January 22, 1975, Park announced that vote on their confidence in the government and a referendum to reform the constitution. On February 12, 1975, 73.1% of the voters voted yes on the referendum. In 1980, a referendum ratified a new constitution that allowed for a seven-year term presidency with 91.6% of votes in favor of the referendum. 95.5% of eligible voters voted in the referendum.

In 1987, a referendum ratified a new constitution that provided for direct presidential election, removed the power of the president to dissolve parliament, increased the power of parliament, and guaranteed the rights to the freedom of the press and labor rights with a 93.1% vote in favor. 78.2% of registered voters voted. The referendum was a result of the June Democratic Struggle. In 2011, a referendum in Seoul to give all students free lunch failed because voter turnout was too low. The Mayor of Seoul, Oh Se-hoon, resigned over the results of the referendum.
