= 2011 South Korean by-elections =

The two South Korean 2011 by-elections took place on April 27, 2011 in 38 electoral districts across the country and on October 26, 2011 in Seoul after Oh Se-hoon resigned due to his failure in the Seoul Free Lunch Referendum.

== October 26 ==
The main focus of the October by-election was about filling the vacant seat of the mayor of Seoul. The election was eventually won by an independent candidate Park Won-soon against the Grand National Party candidate, Na Kyung-won. On an anecdotal view, an unnamed representative of an electoral district in Seoul said that the general public mood against the Grand National Party was closely similar to political events in 2004, when former president Roh Moo-hyun was on the verge of being impeached.

=== Seoul mayoral by-election ===
Candidate	Party	Votes	%
Park Won-soon	Independent (DP, DLP)	2,158,476	53.40
Na Kyung-won	Grand National Party	1,867,880	46.21
Bae Il-do	Independent	15,408	0.38
Total		4,041,764	100.00
Valid votes		4,041,764	99.39
Invalid/blank votes		24,793	0.61
Total votes		4,066,557	100.00
Registered voters/turnout		8,374,067	48.56

=== Impact ===
==== Blue House ====
The Blue House under the Lee Myung-bak government has been negatively impacted the most. President Lee Myung-bak did not make any official commentary right after the election's result due to a real estate dispute and due to the growing younger voters' opposition against him.

==== Grand National Party ====
This October by-election is known to have a negative impact on the right wing political establishments in South Korea, notably Lee Myung-bak government and the Grand National Party. Grand National Party politician, Jeon Yeo-ok, made a remark that "the Grand National Party is a party that betrays its supporters" after the loss. The youth faction of the GNP made a suggestion to rename the party to another name to avoid criticisms. There has been a growing pessimistic outlook for the Grand National Party. Former Prime Minister and current head of the Presidential Commission for Shared Growth for Large and Small Companies, Chung Un-chan, mentioned in the GNP Incheon branch seminar on November 17 how "the GNP doesn't receive any affection" and "would most likely lose the next presidential election". Some high-profile GNP members deny that this by-election is a loss. For instance, chairperson Hong Jun-pyo responded as "neither a win nor a loss". Hong's comment later triggered backlashes among other GNP members, including Won Hee-ryong.
