= Spacebring =

Polish software developer

- Company type: Privately held company
- Industry: Commercial Real Estate SaaS Technology
- Founded: 2017
- Headquarters: Gdańsk, Poland
- Area served: Worldwide
- Website: spacebring.com

Spacebring (formerly andcards) is the developer of software for coworking spaces and shared spaces. The company won multiple awards in the United States (G2 Crowd), South Korea (K-Startup Grand Challenge), Chile (Start-Up Chile), and Ukraine (Google for Startups).

== Spacebring Software Service ==
Spacebring is a software service for coworking spaces and shared offices. Spacebring is currently available on iOS, Android, and as a web app.

== See also ==
- Cloud computing
- Coworking
- PaaS
- SaaS
