= Small and Medium Business Administration =

1996–2017 South Korean government ministry

- 중소기업청

Agency overview
- Formed: February 9, 1996
- Dissolved: July 25, 2017; 8 years ago
- Superseding agency: Ministry of SMEs and Startups
- Employees: 353

Korean name
- Hangul: 중소기업청
- Hanja: 中小企業廳
- RR: Jungsogieopcheong
- MR: Chungsogiŏpch'ŏng

The Small and Medium Business Administration (SMBA; Korean: 중소기업청) was a South Korean government organization under the Ministry of Trade, Industry and Energy. The headquarters was in Seo District, Daejeon.

It was founded in 1996, and dissolved in July 2017. The Ministry of SMEs and Startups succeeded the organization.

== See also ==
- Small Enterprise and Market Service
- Ministry of SMEs and Startups
