= Han Seong-sook =

Prime Minister of South Korea since 2026

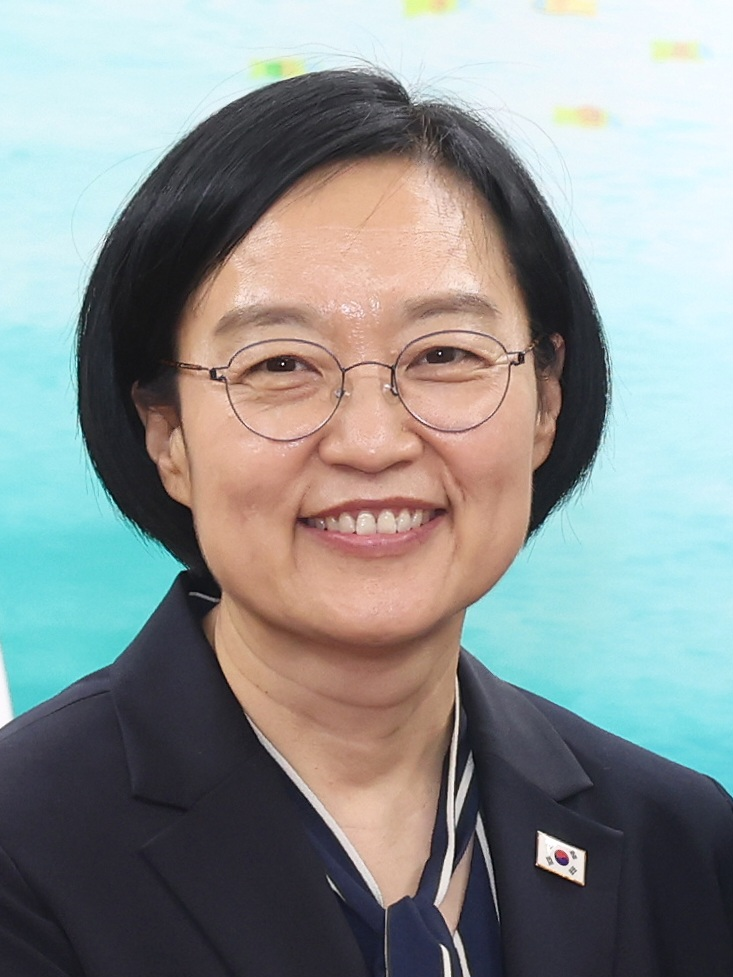
- Han in 2026

50th Prime Minister of South Korea
- Incumbent
- Assumed office 1 July 2026
- President: Lee Jae Myung
- Deputy: Koo Yun-cheol; Bae Kyung-hoon; Lee Hyoung-il
- Preceded by: Kim Min-seok

Minister of SMEs and Startups
- In office 23 July 2025 – 30 June 2026
- President: Lee Jae Myung
- Prime Minister: Kim Min-seok
- Preceded by: Oh Young-ju
- Succeeded by: Noh Yong-seok (acting); Lee So-young

Personal details
- Born: 20 June 1967 (age 59) Gyeonggi Province, South Korea
- Party: Independent
- Education: Sookmyung Women's University (BA)
- Occupation: Business executive
- Known for: Former CEO of Naver Corporation
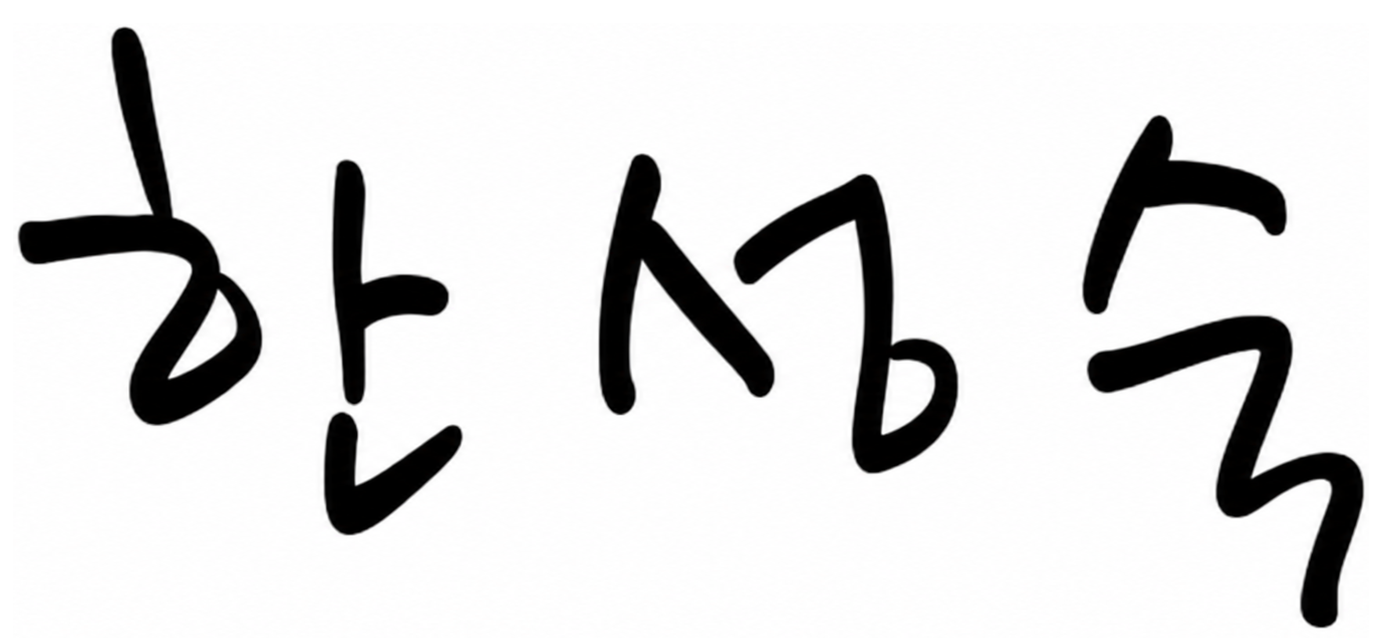
- Signature

Korean name
- Hangul: 한성숙
- Hanja: 韓聖淑
- RR: Han Seongsuk
- MR: Han Sŏngsuk

Han Seong-sook (Korean: 한성숙; born 20 June 1967) is a South Korean businesswoman and politician who has served as the Prime minister of South Korea since 2026. She was previously the chief executive officer (CEO) of Naver Corporation from 2017 to 2021 and served as the Minister of SMEs and startups from 2025 to 2026. She is the first woman to hold the position since Han Myeong-sook in 2006, 20 years prior.

== Early life and education ==
Han Seong-sook was born on 20 June 1967 in Gyeonggi Province. She received a Bachelor's degree in English Literature from Sookmyung Women's University in 1989.

== Career ==
=== Early career ===
In 1989, Han began working as a reporter at Mincom. She later reported for PC Line. In 1995, she led public relations for Nanum Technology.

=== Naver ===
In 1997, Han was a founding member of Empas, one of South Korea's most popular search engines in the early 2000s, and led its search business. After Empas was sold to SK Communications in 2007, Han began to serve in executive roles at Naver under its original incarnation as NHN Corporation.

In 2017, Han, a vice president at the time, became CEO of Naver Corporation after Kim Sang-hun stepped down from the role. As the company's first female CEO, Han lead the development of Naver Pay and V Live and Naver's acquisition of Wattpad.

In 2021, Han stepped down as CEO after a Naver employee committed suicide, citing workplace bullying as the motive, and was replaced by Choi Soo-yeon. Han later led Naver's expansion in Europe.

== Premiership (2026–present) ==
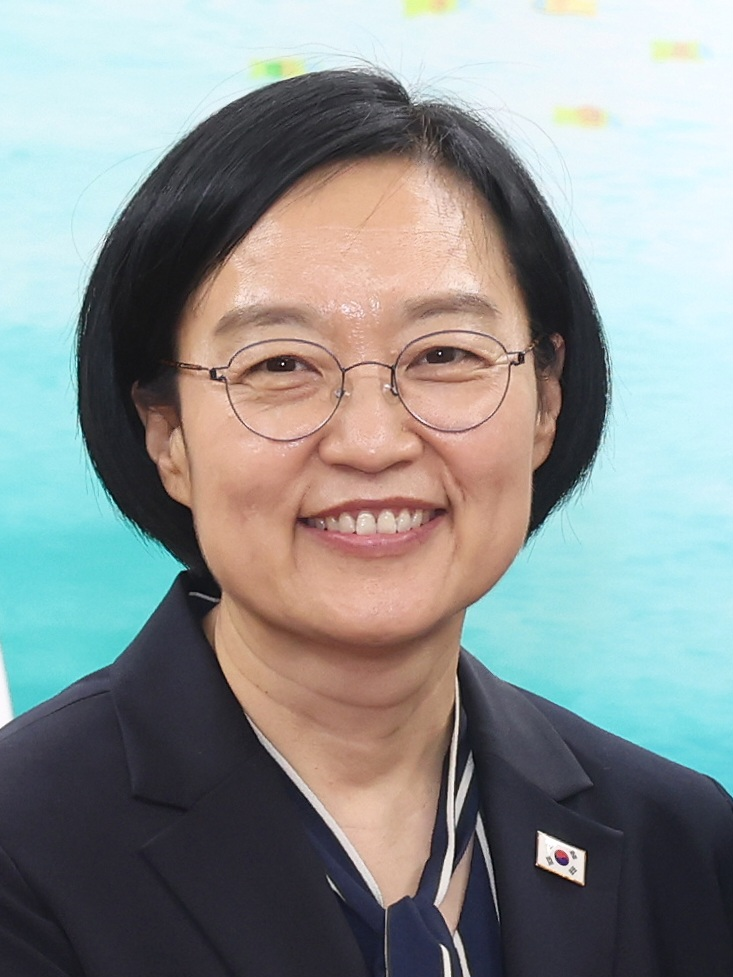
- Han in 2026
- Premiership of Han Seong-sook; 1 July 2026 – present
- President: Lee Jae Myung
- Cabinet: Full list
- Party: Independent
- Seat: Sejong City

=== Appointment ===
On 7 June 2026, President Lee Jae Myung nominated Han to succeed Kim Min-seok as Prime Minister. Preparation for her confirmation hearing began on 8 June. The two-day confirmation hearing was held on 25 and 26 June.

On 30 June 2026, Han was confirmed as prime minister by the National Assembly, with 166 votes in favor and one invalid vote. The People Power Party boycotted the vote. She became the second female prime minister in South Korean history, following Han Myeong-sook, who served as Prime Minister from 2006 to 2007. She is also the first business executive to assume the position of prime minister. Her term as prime minister began on 1 July 2026, following the approval of National Assembly's appointment by President Lee.

=== Tenure ===
Since taking office on 1 July 2026, Han has focused her tenure on making AI transformation a central government priority, expanding AI-based government systems and increasing the use of public data for AI development. She has also pushed for greater investment in AI and advanced industries, while seeking to remove regulations that could hinder technological innovation.

Han has additionally prioritized economic stability and inflation control, directing the government to closely monitor prices of essential goods and respond to pressures from high oil prices, a weaker won and rising consumer costs.

== Recognition ==
From 2017 to 2021, Fortune included Han on its "Most Powerful Women International" list. In 2018, Han was listed on Forbes' "The Emergent 25 Asia's Latest Star Businesswomen" list.

Political offices
Preceded by Kim Min-seok	Prime Minister of South Korea; 1 July 2026–	Incumbent
Preceded by Oh Young-ju	Minister of SMEs and Startups; 23 July 2025–30 June 2026	Succeeded by Noh Yong-suk (Acting); Lee So-young
