= K-Startup Grand Challenge =

- K-스타트업 그랜드 챌린지
- Formation: 2016; 9 years ago
- Type: Governmental organization
- Purpose: Start-up support
- Location: Pangyo, South Korea
- Parent organization: National IT Industry Promotion Agency
- Website: https://www.k-startupgc.org/

K-Startup Grand Challenge is a startup accelerator program supported by the Government of South Korea. The program was launched in 2016 by the National IT Industry Promotion Agency (NIPA) and funded by the Ministry of SMEs and Startups of South Korea. The program is based in the Pangyo Techno Valley, known as the Korean version of the Silicon Valley.

As part of the government's policy, South Korea has initiated a wide range of support programs for startups and has been investing nearly $2 billion annually into the Korean start-up ecosystem since 2013. Within the scope of these efforts, the government organized the K-Startup Grand Challenge program to invite foreign start-ups to come to Korea and cooperate with local VCs and companies. Inviting start-ups from overseas is also aimed at assisting Korea's evolution into a prominent startup business hub.

== Program Contents ==
The process is composed of the following contents:

- Worldwide application usually runs for several months. Invited judges will review applications choose teams for auditions.
- global auditions (Online) to select teams for interview and in-depth review by invited judges.
- final selection of 60 teams for participation in the accelerating program.
- Demo Day will be held in Nov. 19 – 21st. Top 30 teams will be selected on the day based on their accelerating program activities and presentations. There will be also top 5 teams' selection. Additional grant will be given to those top 30 and 5 teams in order to do business in Korea.

== K-Startup Grand Challenge Programs by Years ==
=== K-Startup Grand Challenge 2016 ===
2,439 teams from 124 countries applied to the KSGC 2016 program. After judges reviewed documents and auditioned the applicants, 40 startups were selected for an accelerating program. On Demo day, only half of these teams was selected. Those 20 teams were given addition fund from the government afterward.

=== K-Startup Grand Challenge 2017 ===
The KSGC 2017 program was expanded to 49 teams. Those of 1,515 applicants invited to Korea. The program provided the following financial support:

- round trip flight tickets for two team members.
- ₩14,000,000 to cover the living expenses during four months from August to November.
- Demo Day grants of ₩120,000,000 (1st place), ₩48,000,000 (2nd place), ₩24,000,000 (3rd place) and ₩7,200,000 (4th place).
- A total of ₩32,000,000 settlement support for each of the Top 25 teams from January to June.

=== K-Startup Grand Challenge 2018 ===
The program was expanded again. 1,771 teams applied to the program and 73 candidate teams were invited to Korea. After several months of the accelerating program, 40 teams were chosen on Demo day. The Korean Government supported those teams afterward.

=== K-Startup Grand Challenge 2019 ===
1,677 teams from 95 countries applied to the KSGC 2019 program. Invited judges reviewed all applications and chose 240 teams. Judges had auditions with 240 teams to choose teams for the accelerating program. The result of that was 38 candidate teams selected from auditions. After 38 chosen teams done with the accelerating program, 20 teams were selected on Demo day based on their accelerating program activities. The Korean Government offered aids to 20 teams afterward.

=== K-Startup Grand Challenge 2020 ===
The application period for the 2020 program is may 15 - June 25. The Demo day was presented live in conjunction with Comeup 2020 between 17–19 November 2020.

=== K-Startup Grand Challenge 2021 ===
2,568 teams from 127 countries applied to the KSGC 2021 program. The global announcement period for the 2021 program took place between Jul 5 - Jul 9 where 58 startup teams were selected to participate.

=== K-Startup Grand Challenge 2024 ===
The application period for the 2024 program is from April 30 to June 7, 2024.

In January 31, 2024 The Ministry of SMEs and Startups (MSS) announced that it will recruit teams to participate in the "Challenge! K-Startup 2024"
