= Park Young-sun =

South Korean journalist and politician (born 1960)

- 박영선
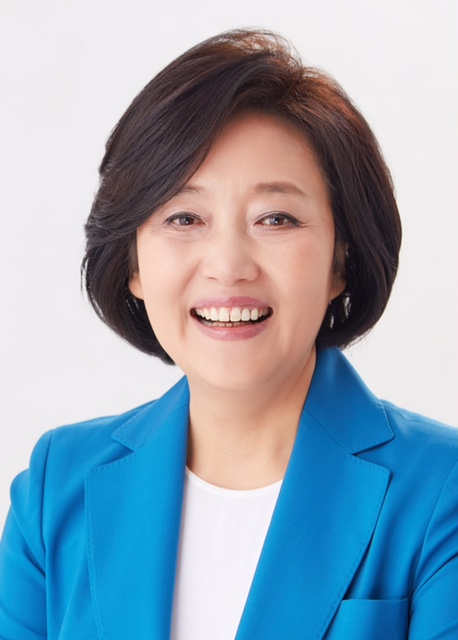

2nd Minister of SMEs and Startups
- In office 8 April 2019 – 20 January 2021
- President: Moon Jae-in
- Prime Minister: Lee Nak-yeon; Chung Sye-kyun
- Preceded by: Hong Jong-hak
- Succeeded by: Kwon Chil-seung

Interim Leader of the New Politics Alliance for Democracy
- In office 4 August 2014 – 27 September 2014
- Preceded by: Kim Han-gil and Ahn Cheol-soo
- Succeeded by: Moon Hee-sang (Interim)

Member of the National Assembly
- In office 30 May 2008 – 29 May 2020
- Preceded by: Kim Han-gil
- Succeeded by: Youn Kun-young
- Constituency: Guro B (Seoul)
- In office 30 May 2004 – 29 May 2008
- Constituency: Proportional representation

Personal details
- Born: 22 January 1960 (age 66) Changnyeong, South Korea
- Party: Democratic
- Children: 1 son
- Education: Kyung Hee University; Sogang University

- Korean name
- Hangul: 박영선
- Hanja: 朴映宣
- RR: Bak Yeongseon
- MR: Pak Yŏngsŏn

Park Young-sun (Korean: 박영선; born 22 January 1960) is a South Korean journalist-turned politician previously served as the second Minister of SMEs and Startups under President Moon Jae-in from April 2019 to 2021 and the first woman to lead SME-specialised government entity since its creation in 1996. Park is also a four-term parliamentarian of Democratic Party.

== Early career ==
After finishing her undergraduate studies, Park began her career in journalism at MBC. She first joined the organisation as an announcer but was shortly transferred to its newsroom. From early 1980s to the early 2000s, Park hosted various television news programmes apart from few years when she was stationed in Los Angeles as its correspondent. From 2003 Park led its Economy News Department before leaving the company in 2004.

== Parliamentarian ==
As a parliamentarian Park holds two titles of being the first woman - to lead the main opposition party as its floor leader and to chair the Legislation and Judiciary Committee at the National Assembly where all bills are reviewed before being introduced to the floor. Park is most known to the public as a parliamentarian for her work on reforming the judiciary system in the country, promoting its "fair economy" and uncovering misdemeanors of Lee Myung-bak administration.

Park first entered politics in 2004 for the general election. She was recruited by Chung Dong-young who was the leader of Uri Party and a fellow ex-MBC reporter. She was elected through proportional representation for which she was on number 9 on her party's list. In the following elections, Park successfully ran for Seoul's Guro B constituency where many SMEs and startups reside.

Park served as a chair of the 19th National Assembly's Legislation and Judiciary Committee and of the party's Special Committee on chaebol reform. She was one of the vocal critics of South Korea's biggest chaebol, Samsung Group, and was particularly noted for her position on a controversial SDS transaction and the profits accumulated from a 1999 deal ruled by the courts as illegal. She played a leading role in passing bills related to economic democratization while serving as a chair of the Legislation and Judiciary Committee in 2013.

From May to October 2014, she served as the floor leader of New Politics Alliance for Democracy. She is the first female politician who was elected a floor leader of a major opposition party in Korea. After Ahn Hee-jung lost party primary to then-candidate Moon Jae-in, she then joined Moon's second presidential campaign in 2017 South Korean presidential election.

In 2011 Park earned the party nomination for Seoul Mayor emptied by Oh Se-hoon but later withdrew her candidacy after their agreed poll found Park Won-soon, then independent candidate, more fit to win the election and defeat Na Kyung-won. In 2018 Park ran for the same post again but lost to Park Won-soon in her party's primary.

== Cabinet minister ==
In March 2019, she was appointed the Minister of SMEs and Startups. Poll in December 2020 shows that over 70% of mid-to-low ranking officer at her Ministry surveyed would like to continue to work with Park as she is poised to run for Seoul Mayor by-election in 2021.

She was also the first South Korean minister to serve in the Stewardship Board at a Davos Forum Platform.

== 2021 Seoul mayoral election ==
In January 2021, after a week after resigning from the SME minister, Park announced her candidacy for Seoul Mayor in the upcoming 2021 by-elections. Her former colleague at Moon's administration, former ministers Park Yang-woo, Cho Myung-rae, Jeong Kyeong-doo and Kang Kyung-wha, joined her campaign as advisors.

On 1 March 2021, Park earned party nomination for Seoul Mayor receiving nearly 70% of the votes cast, defeating the 4-term MP Woo Sang-ho. This makes Park the third woman the democratic party has nominated for Seoul Mayor post after the former Justice Minister Kang Kum-sil and the former Prime Minister Han Myeong-sook. Park was the front-runner to run against Oh Se-hoon from the main opposition party or Ahn Cheol-soo a former Seoul mayor candidate and a former presidential hopeful in the April by-election.

On 7 March, Park was confirmed as the unity candidate of the Democratic Party and the Transition Korea, defeating Cho Jung-hun.

On the polls conducted on 7 April, Park lost to her opponent Oh Se-hoon, who won in a landslide victory.

== Education and Academia ==
Park holds two degrees - a bachelor in geography from Kyung Hee University and a master's in journalism from Sogang University. She also taught journalism in practice classes as an adjunct professor at her first alma mater from 2000 to 2002.

== Election results ==
=== General elections ===
Year	Elections	Constituency	Political party	Votes (%)	Results
2004	17th National Assembly General Election	Proportional representation (9th)	Uri	8,145,824 (38.26%)	Elected
2008	18th National Assembly General Election	Guro B (Seoul)	UDP	34,783 (47.30%)	Won
2012	19th National Assembly General Election	Guro B (Seoul)	DUP	54,902 (61.95%)	Won
2016	20th National Assembly General Election	Guro B (Seoul)	Democratic	50,526 (54.14%)	Won

=== Local elections ===
==== Mayor of Seoul ====
Year	Elections	Constituency	Political party	Votes (%)	Remarks
2021	2021 By-elections	Seoul (Mayoral Elections)	Democratic	1,907,336 (39.18%)	Defeated (2nd)

National Assembly of the Republic of Korea
Preceded by	Member of the National Assembly from Proportional representation (9th Uri Party); 30 May 2004–29 May 2008	Succeeded by
Preceded by Kim Han-gil	Member of the National Assembly from Guro B (Seoul); 30 May 2008–29 May 2020	Succeeded by Youn Kun-young
Party political offices
Preceded by Kim Han-gil; Ahn Cheol-soo (Co-Leader)	Acting Leader of the New Politics Alliance for Democracy; 4 August 2014–27 September 2014	Succeeded by Moon Hee-sang (Interim)
Preceded by Jun Byung-hun	Floor Leader of the New Politics Alliance for Democracy; 7 May 2014–2 October 2014	Succeeded by Kim Yung-rok (Acting); Woo Yoon-keun
Political offices
Preceded by Hong Jong-hak	Minister of SMEs and Startups; 8 April 2019–20 January 2021	Succeeded by Kwon Chil-seung
