= Lee So-young (lawyer) =

South Korean politician (born 1985)

- 이소영

Member of the National Assembly
- Incumbent
- Assumed office 30 May 2020
- Preceded by: Shin Chang-hyun
- Constituency: Gyeonggi Uiwang–Gwacheon

Minister of SMEs and Startups
- Incumbent
- Assumed office 22 September 2026
- President: Lee Jae Myung
- Prime Minister: Han Seong-sook
- Preceded by: Han Seong-sook; Noh Yong-seok (acting)

Personal details
- Born: 30 March 1985 (age 41) Busan, South Korea
- Party: Democratic
- Education: Sungkyunkwan University (LLB); Seoul National University

Lee So-young (Korean: 이소영; Hanja: 李素永; born 30 March 1985) is a South Korean politician representing Uiwang and Gwacheon cities at the National Assembly from 2020.

After passing the Bar exam in 2009 and completing her training at Judicial Research and Training Institute in 2012, Lee worked as a lawyer at Kim & Chang. She revealed that she decided to start her legal career at Kim & Chang due to its sizable department specialised in environment.

After five years Lee quit the firm and founded an NGO dedicated to solving environmental issues. She coordinated "Coal finance" movement with civil societies in 2018 which resulted in some public funds divest from coal-related projects. Lee also took policy-advisory roles to the Moon Jae-in government participating in President's National Council on Climate Change and Air Quality, Prime Minister's National Green Growth Committee and Ministry of Trade, Industry and Energy's New and Renewable Energy Policy Council.

Lee was recruited by the ruling party, Democratic Party of Korea, for the 2020 general election. She defeated two former mayors of Uiwang and Gwacheon in the election.

Lee is well known for her push for "Green New Deal" in her party and the parliament which seeks to legislate the long-term plan required to tackle and adapt to climate change while assisting energy and industry transformations and under-served communities affected. In November 2020 she proposed a bill along with other 45 parliamentarians to legally mandate the country's carbon neutrality by 2050 and to establish public policy and support mechanism to achieve the country's green transitions.

Lee holds a bachelor's degree in law from Sungkyunkwan University and completed postgraduate programme on environmental law at Seoul National University.

== Electoral history ==
Election	Year	District	Party affiliation	Votes	Percentage of votes	Results
21st National Assembly General Election	2020	Gyeonggi Uiwang–Gwacheon	Democratic Party	58,938	43.38%	Won
22nd National Assembly General Election	2024	Gyeonggi Uiwang–Gwacheon	Democratic Party	81,640	54.37%	Won
