= 2018 Seoul mayoral election =

Local election in South Korea

- 13 June 2018
- Turnout: 5,019,098 (59.89%)
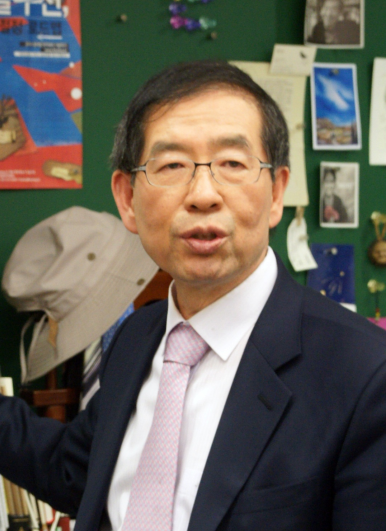

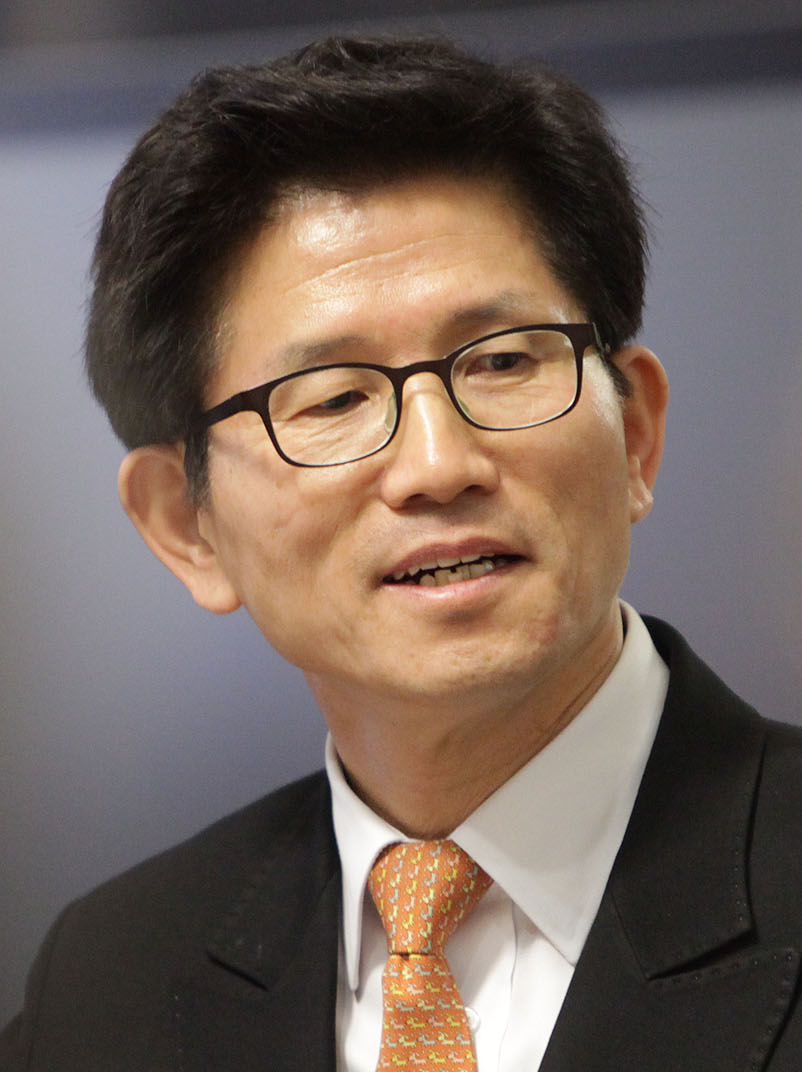

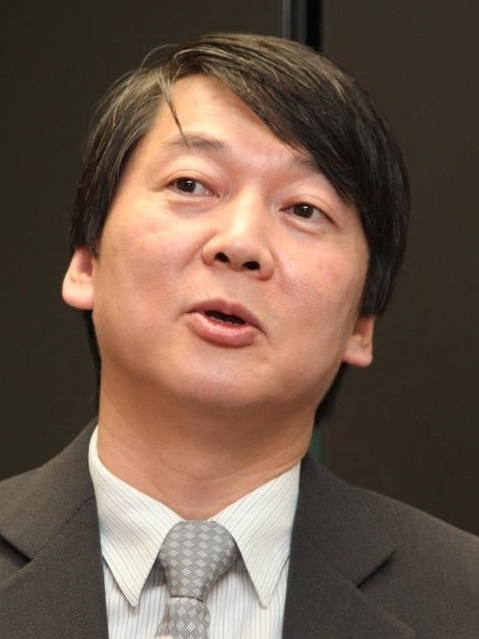
Candidate	Park Won-soon	Kim Moon-soo	Ahn Cheol-soo
Party	Democratic	Liberty Korea	Bareunmirae
Popular vote	2,619,497	1,158,487	970,374
Percentage	52.79%	23.34%	19.55%
Mayor before election
Park Won-soon
Democratic
Elected Mayor
Park Won-soon
Democratic

The 2018 Seoul mayoral election was held on 13 June 2018 as part of the 7th local elections. Incumbent Park Won-soon was elected for his third consecutive term; the South Korean Public Election Act places a limit of three consecutive terms on holders of the post, so that Park will not be able to run in the next mayoral election.

== Selection of candidates ==
=== Democratic Party of Korea ===
2018 Democratic Party of Korea Seoul mayoral primary results
Candidate	Place	Results
Park Won-soon	Nominated	66.3%
Park Young-sun	2nd	19.6%
Woo Sang-ho	3rd	14.1%
		100%

=== Liberty Korea Party ===
2018 Liberty Korea Party Seoul mayoral primary results
Candidate	Place	Results
Kim Moon-soo	Nominated	Walkover

=== Bareunmirae Party ===
2018 Bareunmirae Party Seoul mayoral primary results
Candidate	Place	Results
Ahn Cheol-soo	Nominated	Walkover

=== Justice Party ===
2018 Justice Party Seoul mayoral primary results
Candidate	Place	Results
Kim Jong-min	Nominated	58.1%
Chung Ho-jin	2nd	41.9%
		100%

== Final candidates ==
Name	Age	Party	Notes
Park Won-soon	62	Democratic Party of Korea	Mayor of Seoul (2011–present)
Kim Moon-soo	66	Liberty Korea Party	Member of the National Assembly (1996–2006); Governor of Gyeonggi Province (2006–2014)
Ahn Cheol-soo	56	Bareunmirae Party	Member of the National Assembly (2013–2017); Co-leader of the New Politics Alliance for Democracy (2014); Leader of the People's Party (2016, 2017–2018)
Kim Jong-min	47	Justice Party	
Kim Jin-sook	39	Minjung Party	
Ihn Ji-yeon	45	Korean Patriots' Party	
Sin Jie-ye	27	Green Party Korea	
Woo In-cheol	33	Our Future	
Choi Tae-hyeon	62	Chinbak Yeondae	

== Results ==
=== Summary ===
2018 Seoul mayoral election
Party	Candidate	Votes	%
Democratic	Park Won-soon	2,619,497	52.79
Liberty Korea	Kim Moon-soo	1,158,487	23.34
Bareunmirae	Ahn Cheol-soo	970,374	19.55
Green	Sin Jie-ye	82,874	1.67
Justice	Kim Jong-min	81,664	1.64
Minjung	Kim Jin-sook	22,134	0.44
Our Future	Woo In-cheol	11,599	0.23
Patriots'	Ihn Ji-yeon	11,222	0.22
Chinbak Yeondae	Choi Tae-hyeon	4,021	0.08
Total votes		4,961,872	100.00
Rejected ballots		57,226	–
Turnout		5,019,098	59.89
Registered electors		8,380,947	

=== By districts ===
Districts	Park Won-soon DP		Kim Moon-soo LKP		Ahn Cheol-soo Bareunmirae		Kim Jong-min JP		Kim Jin-sook Minjung		Ihn Ji-yeon KPP		Sin Jie-ye GPK		Woo In-cheol Our Future		Choi Tae-hyeon Chin. Yeon.		Total votes
Districts	Votes	%	Votes	%	Votes	%	Votes	%	Votes	%	Votes	%	Votes	%	Votes	%	Votes	%	Total votes
Jongno District	41,148	51.37	18,777	23.44	15,946	19.90	1,469	1.83	358	0.44	223	0.27	1,896	2.36	215	0.26	59	0.07	80,091
Jung District	34,243	52.28	15,618	23.84	12,814	19.56	1,023	1.56	279	0.42	193	0.29	1,076	1.64	149	0.22	96	0.14	65,491
Yongsan District	53,964	47.06	31,073	27.09	24,074	20.99	2,151	1.87	436	0.38	231	0.20	2,392	2.08	226	0.19	115	0.10	114,662
Seongdong District	84,106	53.96	34,878	22.37	30,379	19.49	2,594	1.66	689	0.44	309	0.19	2,418	1.55	370	0.23	123	0.07	155,866
Gwangjin District	99,366	55.70	38,606	21.64	32,310	18.11	3,077	1.72	804	0.45	376	0.21	3,222	1.80	482	0.27	125	0.07	178,368
Dongdaemun District	93,913	53.44	40,984	23.32	33,437	19.02	2,731	1.55	827	0.47	434	0.24	2,848	1.62	404	0.22	145	0.08	175,723
Jungnang District	109,318	55.71	45,905	23.39	33,672	17.16	2,662	1.35	959	0.48	519	0.26	2,561	1.30	429	0.21	185	0.09	196,210
Seongbuk District	119,898	54.62	47,274	21.53	42,105	19.18	3,750	1.70	918	0.41	523	0.23	4,349	1.98	497	0.22	187	0.08	219,501
Gangbuk District	85,839	55.74	33,537	21.77	28,138	18.27	2,396	1.55	718	0.46	481	0.31	2,276	1.47	431	0.27	165	0.10	153,981
Dobong District	92,172	53.71	39,099	22.78	33,308	19.40	2,767	1.61	810	0.47	445	0.25	2,430	1.41	434	0.25	144	0.08	171,609
Nowon District	150,657	53.88	54,461	19.47	62,193	22.24	4,866	1.74	1,448	0.51	609	0.21	4,364	1.56	732	0.26	248	0.08	279,578
Eunpyeong District	131,287	55.77	49,071	20.84	44,033	18.70	4,167	1.77	1,121	0.47	533	0.22	4,421	1.87	522	0.22	216	0.09	235,371
Seodaemun District	87,486	54.05	34,514	21.32	31,494	19.45	2,842	1.75	879	0.54	333	0.20	3,780	2.33	394	0.24	120	0.07	161,842
Mapo District	105,956	54.26	40,249	20.61	37,233	19.06	4,369	2.23	927	0.47	386	0.19	5,475	2.80	496	0.25	170	0.08	195,261
Yangcheon District	125,557	53.18	53,780	22.77	47,056	19.93	4,052	1.71	979	0.41	507	0.21	3,455	1.46	525	0.22	180	0.07	236,091
Gangseo District	168,733	56.16	64,676	21.52	54,090	18.00	5,356	1.78	1,522	0.50	690	0.22	4,387	1.46	696	0.23	259	0.08	300,409
Guro District	113,799	54.51	48,981	23.46	37,784	18.09	3,363	1.61	1,006	0.48	436	0.20	2,709	1.29	494	0.23	191	0.09	208,763
Geumcheon District	64,662	56.06	25,156	21.81	21,106	18.29	1,539	1.33	681	0.59	334	0.28	1,505	1.30	235	0.20	117	0.10	115,335
Yeongdeungpo District	100,899	52.10	46,666	24.09	37,945	19.59	3,145	1.62	988	0.51	421	0.21	3,008	1.55	416	0.21	155	0.08	193,643
Dongjak District	114,563	54.31	46,094	21.85	41,257	19.55	3,564	1.68	863	0.40	382	0.18	3,535	1.67	522	0.24	152	0.07	210,932
Gwanak District	152,069	58.02	47,686	18.19	49,248	18.79	4,745	1.81	1,490	0.56	606	0.23	5,336	2.03	684	0.26	230	0.08	262,094
Seocho District	96,452	42.86	69,910	31.06	50,486	22.43	3,010	1.33	600	0.26	454	0.20	3,535	1.57	459	0.20	106	0.04	225,012
Gangnam District	107,743	40.82	87,305	33.07	58,987	22.34	3,723	1.41	721	0.27	586	0.22	4,240	1.60	499	0.18	134	0.05	263,938
Songpa District	171,592	49.61	90,144	26.06	71,367	20.63	4,952	1.43	1,207	0.34	686	0.19	4,861	1.40	780	0.22	230	0.06	345,819
Gangdong District	114,075	52.74	54,043	24.98	39,912	18.45	3,351	1.54	904	0.41	525	0.24	2,795	1.29	508	0.23	169	0.07	216,282
Total	2,619,497	52.79	1,158,487	23.34	970,374	19.55	81,664	1.64	22,134	0.44	11,222	0.22	82,874	1.67	11,599	0.23	4,021	0.08	4,961,872
