= Seo Jung-hyup =

Acting mayor of Seoul

- 서정협

Acting Mayor of Seoul
- In office 10 July 2020 – 7 April 2021
- Preceded by: Park Won-soon
- Succeeded by: Oh Se-hoon

Deputy Mayor for Administration of Seoul
- In office 17 January 2020 – 22 April 2021; Serving with Kim Hak-jin
- Preceded by: Kang Tae-woong
- Succeeded by: Cho In-dong

Personal details
- Born: 3 January 1965 (age 61) Ulsan, South Gyeongsang, South Korea
- Citizenship: South Korea
- Party: Independent
- Education: Seoul National University (B.Econ 1987, MPA 1991); Korea National Open University (BA Eng. and B. Litt 2007); Harvard University (MPA 2000); University of Seoul (PhD without dissertation 2011)
- Occupation: Educator, public administrator, politician

Korean name
- Hangul: 서정협
- Hanja: 徐正協
- RR: Seo Jeonghyeop
- MR: Sŏ Chŏnghyŏp

Seo Jung-hyup (Korean: 서정협, born 3 January 1965) is a South Korean educator and politician who served as the deputy mayor of administration and the acting mayor of Seoul from 2020 to 2021. Prior to becoming the deputy mayor, Seo served as the head of the Seoul Metropolitan Government's cultural department.

== Early years and studies ==
Seo Jung-hyup was born and raised in Ulsan. After graduating from Hakseong High School in 1983, Seo moved to Seoul to complete his post secondary studies.

Seo studied international economics at Seoul National University (BA), as well as public administration at University of Seoul (MA), Korea National Open University (MA as well as BA in English and Literature), Harvard University's Kennedy School in Public Administration (MA)

== Academic and municipal career ==
Following his completion of administrative exams in 1991, Seo has worked at various positions within the Seoul Metropolitan City Government, as well as adjunct professor at various universities in Seoul (Korea University, Hanyang University, Yonsei University).

He became Deputy Mayor in January 2020 and Acting Mayor on 10 July 2020.
