= Small Enterprise and Market Service =

Agency overview
- Formed: 1 January 2014; 12 years ago
- Jurisdiction: South Korea
- Headquarters: 92 Jijok-ro 364beon-gil, Yuseong-ju, Daejeon
- Agency executive: Park Seong-hyo, Chairman
- Parent department: Ministry of SMEs and Startups

Korean name
- Hangul: 소상공인시장진흥공단
- RR: Sosanggongin sijang jinheung gongdan
- MR: Sosanggongin sijang chinhŭng kongdan

The Small Enterprise and Market Service (Korean: 소상공인시장진흥공단) is a division of the Ministry of SMEs and Startups in South Korea. Its goal is to facilitate the development of small businesses and improve the country's traditional markets to encourage tourism. It was formed in 2014 from the merger of the Agency for Traditional Market Administration (시장경영진흥원) and the Small Enterprise Development Agency (소상공인진흥원).

== See also ==
- List of markets in South Korea
