= Hanyang University College of Engineering =

School in Seoul, South Korea

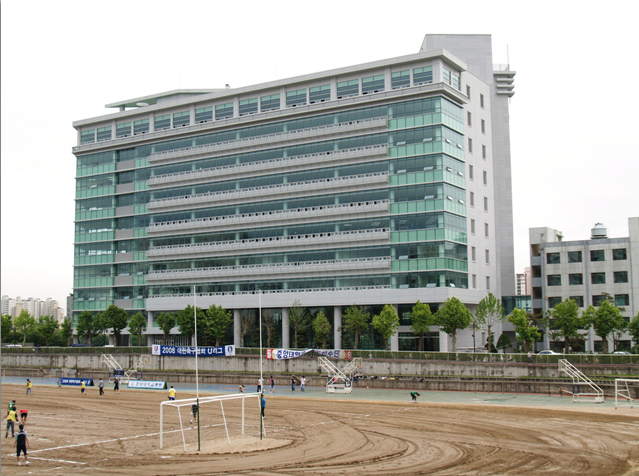
Fusion Technology Center, the building of Department of Energy Engineering.

College of Engineering Hanyang University (Korean: 한양대학교 공과대학) is the oldest engineering school in South Korea which is established in 1939. It is the major college(number of students, professors, etc.) of Hanyang University.

== Organization ==
=== Undergraduate ===
History of College of Engineering

College of Engineering in Hanyang University is divided into 4 distinct colleges by its field, and all these colleges are administratively-independent.

College of Engineering I

Field : Architecture / Urban / Environment

- Department of Architecture
- Department of Architectural Engineering
- Department of Civil and Environmental Engineering
- Department of Urban Planning and Engineering
- Department of Geoenvironmental System Engineering

College of Engineering II

Field : IT / Electronics

- Department of Computer Science & Engineering
- Department of Information Systems
- Department of Electronics and Communications Engineering
- Department of Fusion Electronics
- Department of Energy Engineering
- Department of Electrical and Biomedical Engineering

College of Engineering III

Field : Materials / Chemicals / Energy

- Department of Materials Science and Engineering
- Department of Applied Chemical Engineering
- Department of Energy

College of Engineering IV

Fields: Mechanics / Industrial Engineering / Nuclear Engineering

- Department of Mechanical Engineering
- Department of Nuclear Engineering
- Department of Industrial Engineering

== Education ==
College of Engineering, Hanyang University has its own education program than generals of Hanyang University. For example, : ABEEK (Certification of Engineering Education) and Project for graduation. The education policy down below is for only in college of engineering. It also has another education program according to general program of Hanyang University, like exchange student program with MIT

=== ABEEK ===
ABEEK is Certification of Engineering Education in Korea. Students in College of Engineering can take this course for option. Some companies, like Samsung, asks applicants whether they took ABEEK course.

=== Joint degree Program ===
College of Engineering and College of Engineering Science have joint degree(Bachelor) program with Illinois Institute of Technology and Temple University. They send about 35 – 60 students to IIT

=== Project for graduation ===
Most of Departments in College of Engineering have certification program for graduation like "Capstone Design", "Engineering Project". Students who take this program designs their own portfolio and it will be estimated by professors. Some students said this program as "Graduation Project"(The official name of this program is not unified). Students must pass this program or postpone their graduation until passing it.

== Performance ==
Hanyang University College of engineering affects a lot in South Korea society. It was the oldest engineering college in South Korea. And it has been called as an "Engineer Academy". Also there are many alumni in Korea society. Chung Ju-yung, formal president of Hyundai Group, said about Hanyang University College of Engineering on official speech. It publishes the SCI journal named Journal of Ceramic Processing Research

== See also ==
- Hanyang University
- College of Engineering
- Hanyang University Station
- Illinois Institute of Technology
