= Park Won-soon =

South Korean politician (1955–2020)

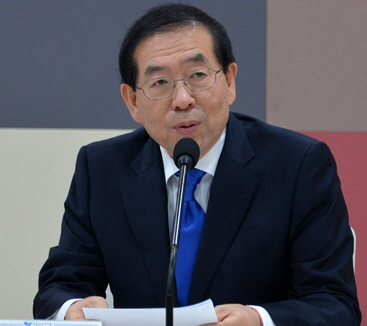
- Park in 2014

Mayor of Seoul
- In office October 27, 2011 – July 9, 2020
- Preceded by: Oh Se-hoon; Kwon Yeong-gyu (acting)
- Succeeded by: Seo Jung-hyup (acting); Oh Se-hoon

Personal details
- Born: February 11, 1955 or March 26, 1956 Changnyeong, South Korea
- Died: July 9, 2020 (aged 64 or 65) Jongno, Seoul, South Korea
- Cause of death: Suicide
- Party: Democratic
- Spouse: Kang Nan-hee
- Education: Seoul National University (Expelled); Dankook University (BA); London School of Economics (Diploma)

Korean name
- Hangul: 박원순
- Hanja: 朴元淳
- RR: Bak Wonsun
- MR: Pak Wŏnsun

Park Won-soon (Korean: 박원순; February 11, 1955 or March 26, 1956 – July 9, 2020) was a South Korean politician, lawyer and activist who served as the Mayor of Seoul from 2011 until his death in 2020. A member of the Democratic Party of Korea, he was the longest-serving mayor of Seoul. He died by suicide in July 2020 following allegations of sexual harassment.

Prior to being elected as mayor, Park was a community and social justice activist, serving as a member of the Truth and Reconciliation Commission. He wrote many books on transitional justice as international human rights lawyer and worked as the chief prosecutor for both North and South Korea for the first time in The Women's International War Crimes Tribunal on Japan's Military Sexual Slavery accusing the Showa Emperor. A noted political donor in Seoul, Park contributed to political organizations and think tanks that advocated for grassroots solutions towards social, educational, environmental, and political issues. As a mayor of Seoul, he was awarded for the first time in South Korea, Gothenburg Award for Sustainable Development for 'sharing city' and Lee Kuan Yew World City Prize, Singapore for changing the city into an inclusive, socially stable and innovative city.

In July 2020, Park's former secretary accused him of four years of sexual harassment; Park died the next day, in an apparent suicide.

== Early life ==
Park Won-soon was born on February 11, 1955 or March 26, 1956, in Changnyeong, South Korea. He was enrolled at Kyunggi High School in 1971 and graduated in 1974.

At first, Park went to earn his Bachelor of Arts at Seoul National University, but was expelled and detained for four months over a protest he held over the military dictatorship of President Park Chung Hee. He later earned his Bachelor of Arts at Dankook University. Park earned his diploma in international law at the London School of Economics at University of London in 1991.

== Career ==
Park worked as a public prosecutor in the Daegu District Court in Gyeongsang Province from 1982 to 1983. Returning to Seoul from Daegu, he launched into private law practice. He worked as a human rights lawyer and defended many political activists in the 1980s and 1990s.

In 1993, Park became a visiting research fellow in the Human Rights Program of the School of Law in Harvard University. In 1994, he was a principal founder of the nonprofit watchdog organization People's Solidarity for Participatory Democracy (PSPD), which monitors government regulatory practices and fights political corruption.

In 2002, Park stepped down from PSPD to run The Beautiful Foundation, a philanthropic group that promotes volunteerism and community service and addresses issues of income inequality. Beginning in 2005, Park served as part of South Korea's Truth and Reconciliation Commission to address the history of human rights violations in Korean history from Japan's rule of Korea in 1910, up until the end of authoritarian rule in South Korea with the election of President Kim Young-sam in 1993. In 2006, as an offshoot of The Beautiful Foundation, Park founded the Hope Institute, a think tank designed to promote solutions arising from grassroots suggestions for social, educational, environmental, and political problems.

As a lawyer, Park won several major cases, including South Korea's first sexual harassment conviction. He also campaigned for the rights of comfort women.

== Mayor of Seoul (2011–2020) ==
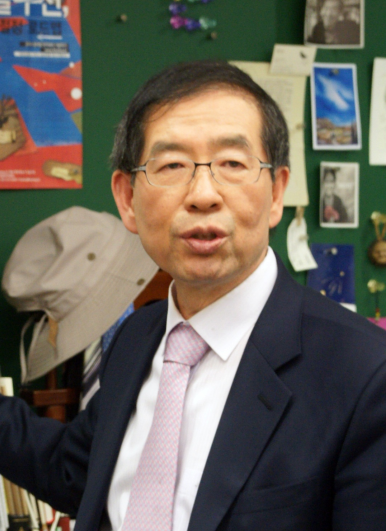
- Mayoralty of Park Won-soon; October 27, 2011 – July 9, 2020
- Party: Democratic
- Election: 2011, 2014, 2018

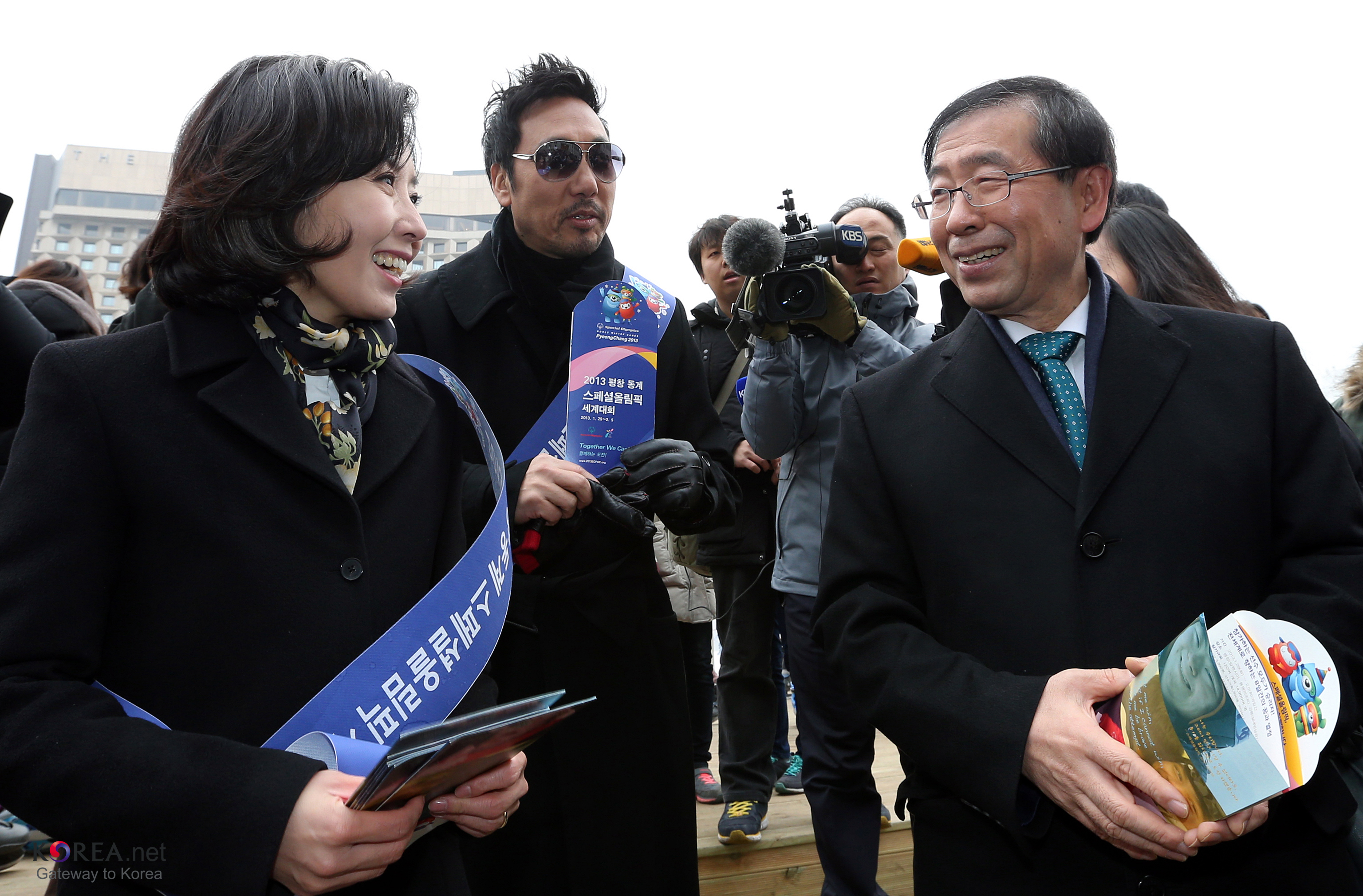
Park discussing the 2013 Special Winter Olympic Games

=== 2011 mayoral campaign ===
In the Seoul mayoral by-election on October 26, 2011, he was elected as an independent candidate with the support of the Democratic Party and Democratic Labor Party. Park's victory is seen as a blow in particular to the Grand National Party and the prospective presidential candidacy of Park Geun-hye, who had publicly supported Park Won-soon's opponent Na Kyung-won, and a triumph for the independent Ahn Cheol-soo, whose support he received. However, the inability of the Democratic Party to present its own candidate, and Park's refusal to join it after he had received its endorsement, served to present Park as a candidate independent of the interests of both established parties.

=== Tenure ===
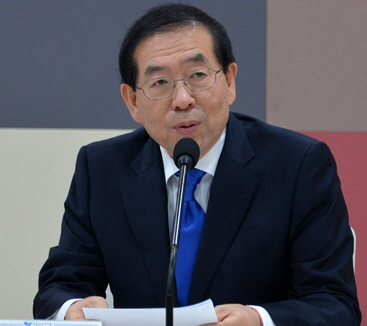
Park in December 2014

As mayor, Park suggested a friendly football match and an orchestra event between South Korea and North Korea. He also praised Japan's local government system during his disaster prevention training there.

Early in 2012, Park was accused of illegally manipulating the army draft health checkup to have his son sent to a favorable post. However, after his son completed a public health checkup, Park and his son were declared innocent and received apologies from his accusers. Park has since said that he would forgive the accusers. In February 2012, Park joined the Democratic United Party.

On September 20, 2012, under the leadership of Park, the Seoul Metropolitan Government announced its plan to promote a sharing vision through the Sharing City Seoul Project. As a consequence of the successful implementation of the plan, Park was recognized in South Korea and internationally as a leader of the Sharing City concept.

On April 14, 2013, Line 9, part of the Seoul Metropolitan Subway, announced a sudden fare increase. Park objected to the fare being raised without negotiation and warned that if the corporation proceeded, Seoul would take over management of the corporation. Line 9 released an apology to the residents of Seoul. On June 4, 2014, Park was elected to his second term as mayor.

On August 4, 2015, Park controversially referred to South Korea as a housefly that should sit on China's buttocks for economic progress. He was a vocal critic of then-President Park Geun-hye and participated in huge rallies against her in central Seoul that led to her impeachment and ousting on corruption charges in 2017. On June 13, 2018, Park was elected to his third and last term as Mayor of Seoul. He was the first mayor in the city's history to be elected to a third term.

== Personal life ==
Park was married to Kang Nan-hee, with whom he had two children: a daughter, Park Da-in, and a son, Park Ju-sin.

He received the Ramon Magsaysay Award in 2006.

On July 8, 2020, one day before his disappearance, a former secretary filed a complaint against Park sexual harassment. She accused Park of physical and digital harassment over a period of four years until she transferred work departments to avoid the misconduct.

== Sexual harassment ==
The victim, who was employed as Park's secretary, was asked to take care of intimate aspects of Park's life, including handling his undergarments before and after he showered. Park also sent inappropriate texts and photos to the victim, including pictures of himself in his underwear as well as obscene late-night messages over the Telegram app. The independent National Human Rights Commission of Korea (NHRC) found that Park's words and actions toward his secretary constituted sexual harassment under the country's laws.

== Death ==
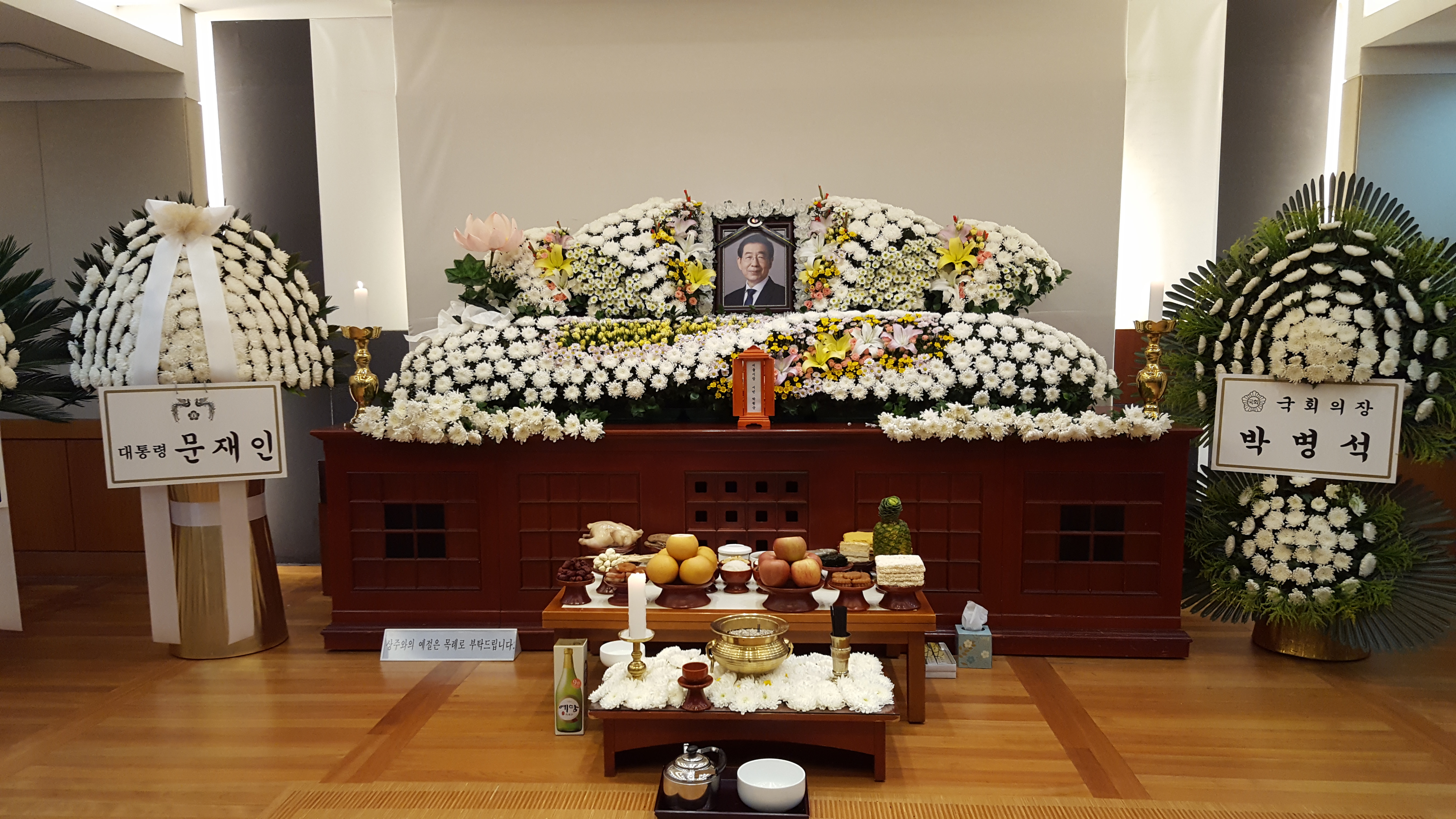
Park's funeral was held after a mourning period of five days.

On July 9, 2020, the day after Park was accused of sexual harassment, Park's daughter reported him as missing after reportedly taking sick leave, alerting the National Police Agency at 5:17 pm KST. Park's cell phone was reported as turned off in the Seongbuk District of Seoul, with his daughter finding a will-like note. Authorities began using search dogs and drones in Seongbuk District. Around midnight, his body was found near Sukjeongmun on Bugak Mountain in northern Seoul. With no foul play found at the scene, it has been broadly reported that the death is considered a suicide.

Park's family accepted a state funeral, held at Seoul City Hall and streamed online on July 13, 2020. About 992,000 people have paid tribute to Park on an online city-run mourning site. Despite the controversy surrounding the sexual harassment, the funeral was paid for by the city using public funds.

== Election results ==
=== Mayor of Seoul ===
Year	Elections	Constituency	Political party	Votes (%)	Results
2011	2011 By-election	Seoul (Mayoral Elections)	Independent	2,158,476 (53.40%)	Won
2014	6th Iocal Election	Seoul (Mayoral Elections)	NPAD	2,752,171 (56.12%)	Won
2018	7th Iocal Election	Seoul (Mayoral Elections)	Democratic	2,619,497 (52.79%)	Won

== See also ==
- List of solved missing person cases (2020s)
- Suicide in South Korea

Political offices
Preceded by Oh Se-hoon; Kwon Yeong-gyu (acting)	Mayor of Seoul; 27 October 2011–9 July 2020	Succeeded by Seo Jung-hyup (acting); Oh Se-hoon
