= National IT Industry Promotion Agency =

NIPA
- Company type: Rep. of Korea Government
- Founded: 1998 (as KIPA, Korea IT Industry Promotion Agency)
- Headquarters: Deoksan, South Korea
- Parent: Ministry of Science and ICT
- Website: nipa.kr

The National IT Industry Promotion Agency (Korean: 정보통신산업진흥원) or NIPA is an IT industry promotion organization operated by the Government of South Korea.
