= 2011 Seoul free lunch referendum =

2011 referendum in South Korea

The Seoul Free Lunch Referendum was a referendum held on 24 August 2011, on the subject of free school meals in the schools around the Seoul Metropolitan Area. Then-mayor of Seoul, Oh Se-hoon, proposed to provide a limited free meal service to the 30% of the impoverished children in Seoul, but the Democratic Party proposed to make the free meal service to every child in Seoul starting from younger elementary school children and gradually to middle school children. This has become the cause of Oh Se-hoon's action to make the final decision of the policy through a referendum. The referendum was later rejected due to the low voter turnout of 25.7%, significantly lower than the required turnout of 33.3%. The low voting rate contributed to Oh Se-hoon's resignation from the mayoralty of Seoul.

== Issues ==
- The Democratic Party called the referendum and Oh Se-hoon's action unjust because the free school lunch in Seoul for a year costs 69.5 billion won while the referendum costs around 12 billion won.
- The Grand National Party, Oh Se-hoon's political party of affiliation, considered Oh's defeat in a different perspective. The Chairperson of the GNP, Hong Jun-pyo, expressed his personal opinion that over 25% of the voting rate is enough to support the GNP for the 2012 presidential election.

== See also ==
- 2011 South Korean by-elections
