= Mayor of Seoul =

Chief executive of South Korea's capital

- 서울특별시장 (Korean)
- Logo of the Seoul Metropolitan Government

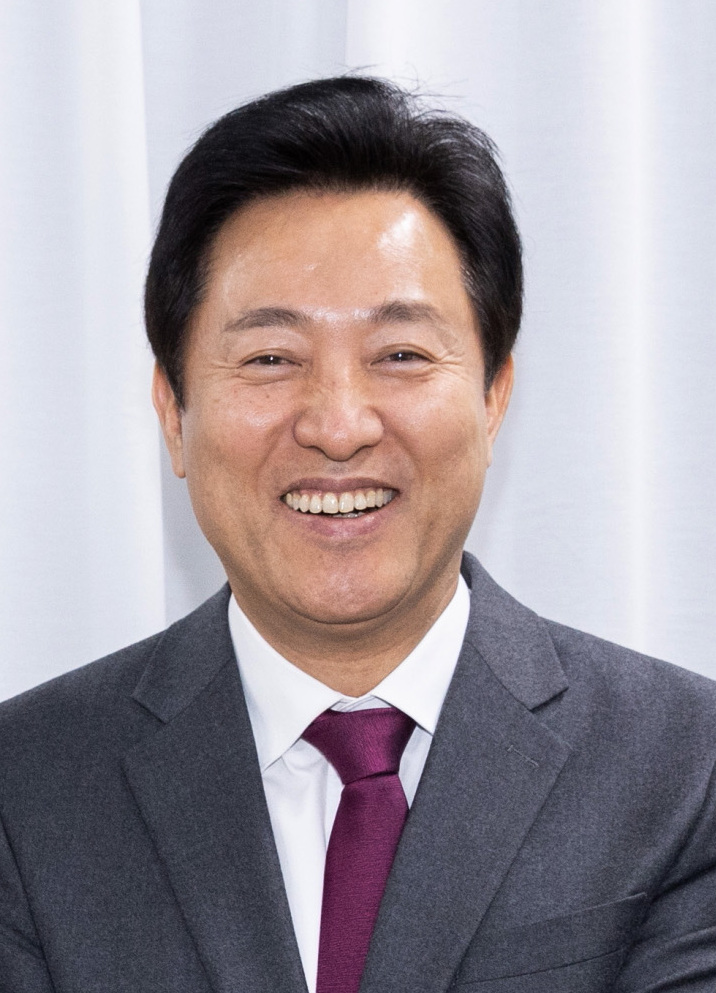
- Incumbent; Oh Se-hoon since 8 April 2021
- Member of: State Council
- Residence: Mayor's residence, Hannam-dong
- Term length: Four years, renewable thrice
- Inaugural holder: Kim Hyong-min
- Formation: 28 September 1946; 80 years ago
- Salary: ₩102 million annually
- Website: Official website

- Mayor of Seoul
- Hangul: 서울특별시장
- Hanja: 서울特別市長
- RR: Seoulteukbyeolsijang
- MR: Sŏult'ŭkpyŏlsijang

The mayor of Seoul (Korean: 서울특별시장) is the chief executive of the Seoul Metropolitan Government, Seoul being the capital and largest city of South Korea.

The position is historically one of the most powerful in the country, charged with managing an annual budget of 51 trillion won. Many Seoul mayors have gone on to hold higher office. Yun Po-sun and Lee Myung-bak both went on to become President of the Republic of Korea.

The mayor of Seoul, although being the head of a local autonomous region in South Korea and not directly related to the central executive branch, has been allowed to attend State Council meetings considering the special status of Seoul as a Special City and its mayor as the only cabinet-level mayor in Korea.

The incumbent mayor is Oh Se-hoon, who assumed office for the third time on 8 April 2021 after a by-election. He won 57.5 percent of the vote. Oh previously served as mayor between 2006 and 2011, having been elected in 2006 and 2010.

== History ==
The modern office of mayor succeeds the historic offices of Hanseong-bu P'anyun (Lord Mayor of Hanseong).

== List of mayors ==
=== Mayors of Gyeongseong ===
Right after independence from Japan, Seoul was temporarily still called Gyeongseong (the Korean reading for Japanese name Keijo) and was a part of Gyeonggi Province before being separated from the province and being designated as a Special City.

Mayor	Took office	Left office
Kim Jangyeong	August 15, 1945	September 11, 1945
James S. Killough (Note: Appointed as Military Mayor by the United States Army Military Government in Korea.)	September 12, 1945	October 24, 1945
Lee Beomsung	October 25, 1945	May 9, 1946
Kim Hyongmin	May 10, 1946	September 27, 1946

=== Appointed mayors of Seoul ===
Portrait	Name (Birth–Death)	Term of office			Political party
Portrait	Name (Birth–Death)	Took office	Left office	Time in office	Political party
	Kim Hyongmin 김형민 (1907–1998) (Note: Officially the first mayor of Seoul, he was the last mayor of Gyeongseong.)	September 28, 1946	December 15, 1948	2 years, 79 days	
	Yun Po-sun 윤보선 (1897–1990)	December 15, 1948	June 6, 1949	174 days	
	Lee Ki-poong 이기붕 (1896–1960)	June 6, 1949	May 8, 1951	1 year, 337 days	
	Kim Tai Sun 김태선 (1903–1977)	June 27, 1951	July 6, 1956	5 years, 60 days	
	Goh Chaebong 고재봉	July 6, 1956	December 14, 1957	1 year, 162 days	
	Ho Chong 허정 (1896–1988)	December 14, 1957	June 12, 1959	1 year, 181 days	Democratic
	Yim Heung Soon 임흥순 (1895–1971)	June 12, 1959	April 30, 1960	324 days	Liberal
	Chang Ki Young 장기영 (1903–1981)	May 2, 1960	June 30, 1960	60 days	Liberal
	Kim Sangdon 김상돈 (1901–1986) (Note: Elected, under the Second Republic)	December 30, 1960	May 16, 1961	138 days	Democratic
	Yoon Taeil 윤태일 (1918–1982)	May 21, 1961	December 16, 1963	2 years, 210 days	Military
	Yun Chi-young 윤치영 (1898–1996)	December 17, 1963	March 30, 1966	2 years, 165 days	Democratic Republican
	Kim Hyun-ok 김현옥 (1926–1997)	March 31, 1966	April 16, 1970	4 years, 17 days	Democratic Republican
	Yang Taek Shik 양택식 (1924–2012)	April 16, 1970	September 2, 1974	4 years, 140 days	Democratic Republican
	Koo Cha Chun 구자춘 (1932–1996)	September 2, 1974	December 22, 1978	4 years, 112 days	Democratic Republican
	Chong Sangchon 정상천 (1931–2015)	December 22, 1978	September 2, 1980	1 year, 256 days	Democratic Republican
	Park Young Su 박영수 (1928–2003)	September 2, 1980	April 28, 1982	1 year, 239 days	Democratic Justice
	Kim Sung-bae 김성배	April 28, 1982	October 15, 1983	1 year, 171 days	Democratic Justice
	Yeom Bo-hyeon 염보현 (1932–2021)	October 15, 1983	December 30, 1987	4 years, 77 days	Democratic Justice
	Kim Yong Nae 김용래 (1934–2009)	December 30, 1987	December 5, 1988	342 days	Democratic Justice
	Goh Kun 고건 (born 1938)	December 5, 1988	December 27, 1990	2 years, 23 days	Democratic Justice
	Park Seh-jik 박세직 (1933–2009)	December 27, 1990	February 18, 1991	54 days	Democratic Liberal
	Lee Haewon 이해원 (1930–2014)	February 19, 1991	June 26, 1992	1 year, 129 days	Democratic Liberal
	Lee Sang-bae 이상배 (born 1939)	June 26, 1992	February 26, 1993	246 days	Democratic Liberal
	Kim Sang chul 김상철 (1947–2012)	February 26, 1993	March 4, 1993	7 days	Democratic Liberal
	Lee Won Jong 이원종 (born 1942)	March 8, 1993	October 21, 1994	1 year, 228 days	Democratic Liberal
	Woo Myoung Kyu 우명규 (born 1936)	October 22, 1994	November 3, 1994	13 days	Democratic Liberal
	Choi Byung-ryeol 최병렬 (1938–2022)	November 3, 1994	June 30, 1995	240 days	Democratic Liberal

=== Directly elected mayors ===
Since 1995, under provisions of the revised Local Government Act, the mayor of Seoul is elected by direct election.

Political parties
Conservative
Liberal
Independent
Status
Denotes acting mayor

Term	Portrait	Name (Birth–Death)	Term of office			Political party	Elected
Term	Portrait	Name (Birth–Death)	Took office	Left office	Time in office	Political party	Elected
1st		Cho Soon 조순 趙淳 (1928–2022)	July 1, 1995	September 9, 1997	2 years, 71 days	Democratic	1995
1st		Kang Deok-ki 강덕기 姜德基 (born 1936); Acting	September 10, 1997	June 30, 1998	294 days	Independent	—
2nd		Goh Kun 고건 高建 (born 1938)	July 1, 1998	June 30, 2002	4 years, 0 days	National Congress → Millennium Democratic	1998
3rd		Lee Myung-bak 이명박 李明博 (born 1941)	July 1, 2002	June 30, 2006	4 years, 0 days	Grand National	2002
4th		Oh Se-hoon 오세훈 吳世勳 (born 1961)	July 1, 2006	August 26, 2011	5 years, 57 days	Grand National	2006
5th		Oh Se-hoon 오세훈 吳世勳 (born 1961)	July 1, 2006	August 26, 2011	5 years, 57 days	Grand National	2010
5th		Kwon Young-kyu 권영규 權寧奎 (born 1955); Acting	August 27, 2011	October 26, 2011	61 days	Independent	—
5th		Park Won-soon 박원순 朴元淳 (1955–2020)	October 27, 2011	July 9, 2020 (Note: Died in office.)	8 years, 257 days	Independent → Democratic United → Democratic ('11) → NPAD → Democratic ('14)	2011 (by-el.)
6th		Park Won-soon 박원순 朴元淳 (1955–2020)	October 27, 2011	July 9, 2020	8 years, 257 days	Independent → Democratic United → Democratic ('11) → NPAD → Democratic ('14)	2014
7th		Park Won-soon 박원순 朴元淳 (1955–2020)	October 27, 2011	July 9, 2020	8 years, 257 days	Independent → Democratic United → Democratic ('11) → NPAD → Democratic ('14)	2018
7th		Seo Jung-hyup 서정협 徐正協 (born 1965); Acting	July 10, 2020	April 7, 2021	273 days	Independent	—
7th		Oh Se-hoon 오세훈 吳世勳 (born 1961)	April 8, 2021	Incumbent	5 years, 203 days	People Power	2021 (by-el.)
8th		Oh Se-hoon 오세훈 吳世勳 (born 1961)	April 8, 2021	Incumbent	5 years, 203 days	People Power	2022
9th		Oh Se-hoon 오세훈 吳世勳 (born 1961)	April 8, 2021	Incumbent	5 years, 203 days	People Power	2026

=== Chairman of the Seoul Municipal People's Committee ===
In 1950, North Korean forces under Kim Il-sung launched Operation Pokpung, placing them in control of Seoul. They imposed a form of local government called the "People's Committee", commonly seen in Communist countries. It effectively displaced the functions of the Metropolitan Government for a short period before United Nations forces retake Seoul in late September 1950. The Sino-North Korean Joint Command would launch the Third Phase Offensive, moving into Seoul on 4 January 1951, but was forced to abandon the city after less than 3 months.

Portrait	Name (Birth–Death)	Term of office			Political party
Portrait	Name (Birth–Death)	Took office	Left office	Time in office	Political party
	Yi Sung-yop 리승엽 (1905–c. 1954–1956) (Note: Later also designated mayor.); 1st term	June 28, 1950	September 27, 1950	92 days	Workers
Position vacant (territory of South Korea)
	Yi Sung-yop 리승엽 (1905–c. 1954–1956); 2nd term	January 4, 1951	March 14, 1951	70 days	Workers
Position vacant (territory of South Korea)

== Elections ==
=== 1995 ===
1995 Seoul mayoral election
Party	#	Candidate	Votes	Percentage
Democratic	2	Cho Soon	2,051,441	42.35%
Independent	7	Park Chan-jong	1,623,356	33.51%
Democratic Liberal	1	Chung Won-shik	1,001,446	20.67%
Independent	9	Hwang San-sung	97,709	2.01%
People First	3	Park Hong-rae	25,054	0.51%
Independent	6	Kim Ok-sun	17,728	0.36%
Korea	4	Goh Soon-bok	10,488	0.21%
Independent	5	Kim Myung-ho	9,992	0.20%
Independent	8	Chung Ki-yong	6,156	0.12%
Total			4,843,370	100.00%
Voter turnout			66.18%	

=== 1998 ===
1998 Seoul mayoral election
Party	#	Candidate	Votes	Percentage
National Congress	2	Goh Kun	1,838,348	53.46%
Grand National	1	Choi Byung-ryeol	1,512,854	43.99%
Independent	3	Lee Byung-ho	87,495	2.54%
Total			3,438,697	100.00%
Voter turnout			47.13%	

=== 2002 ===
2002 Seoul mayoral election
Party	#	Candidate	Votes	Percentage
Grand National	1	Lee Myung-bak	1,819,057	52.28%
Millennium Democratic	2	Kim Min-seok	1,496,754	43.02%
Democratic Labor	4	Lee Moon-ok	87,965	2.52%
Independent	6	Lee Kyung-hee	34,313	0.98%
Green Peace	3	Lim Sam-jin	28,034	0.80%
Socialist	5	Won Yong-soo	12,982	0.37%
Total			3,479,105	100.00%
Voter turnout			45.80%	

=== 2006 ===
2006 Seoul mayoral election
Party	#	Candidate	Votes	Percentage
Grand National	2	Oh Se-hoon	2,409,760	61.05%
Uri	1	Kang Kum-sil	1,077,890	27.31%
Democratic	3	Park Joo-sun	304,565	7.71%
Democratic Labor	4	Kim Jong-chul	117,421	2.97%
People First	5	Lim Woong-kyun	14,111	0.35%
Independent	8	Baek Seung-won	13,808	0.34%
Citizens	6	Lee Gwi-sun	4,790	0.12%
Hanmijun	5	Lee Tae-hee	4,481	0.11%
Total			3,946,826	100.00%
Voter turnout			49.83%	

=== 2010 ===
2010 Seoul mayoral election
Party	#	Candidate	Votes	Percentage
Grand National	1	Oh Se-hoon	2,086,127	47.43%
Democratic	2	Han Myeong-sook	2,059,715	46.83%
New Progressive	4	Roh Hoe-chan	143,459	3.26%
Liberty Forward	3	Ji Sang-wook	90,032	2.04%
Future Union	5	Seok Jong-hyun	18,339	0.41%
Total			4,397,672	100.00%
Voter turnout			53.90%	

=== 2011 (by-election) ===
2011 Seoul mayoral by-election
Party	#	Candidate	Votes	Percentage
Independent	10	Park Won-soon	2,158,476	53.41%
Grand National	1	Na Kyung-won	1,867,880	46.21%
Independent	9	Bae Il-do	15,408	0.38%
Total			4,041,764	100.00%
Voter turnout			48.56%	

=== 2014 ===
2014 Seoul mayoral election
Party	#	Candidate	Votes	Percentage
NPAD	2	Park Won-soon	2,752,171	56.12%
Saenuri	1	Chung Mong-joon	2,109,869	43.02%
Unified Progressive	3	Chung Tae-heung	23,638	0.48%
New Politics	5	Hong Jung-shik	17,603	0.35%
Total			4,903,281	100.00%
Voter turnout			58.63%	

=== 2018 ===
2018 Seoul mayoral election
Party	#	Candidate	Votes	Percentage
Democratic	1	Park Won-soon	2,619,497	52.79%
Liberty Korea	2	Kim Moon-soo	1,158,487	23.34%
Bareunmirae	3	Ahn Cheol-soo	970,374	19.55%
Green	8	Sin Jie-ye	82,874	1.67%
Justice	5	Kim Jong-min	81,664	1.64%
Minjung	6	Kim Jin-sook	22,134	0.44%
Our Future	9	Woo In-cheol	11,599	0.23%
Korean Patriots'	7	Ihn Ji-yeon	11,222	0.22%
Chinbak Yeondae	10	Choi Tae-hyeon	4,021	0.08%
Total			4,961,872	100.00%
Voter turnout			59.89%	

=== 2021 (by-election) ===
2021 Seoul mayoral by-election
Party	#	Candidate	Votes	Percentage
People Power	2	Oh Se-hoon	2,798,788	57.50%
Democratic	1	Park Young-sun	1,907,336	39.18%
National Revolutionary	7	Huh Kyung-young	52,107	1.07%
Women's	11	Kim Jin-ah	33,421	0.68%
Basic Income	6	Shin Ji-hye	23,628	0.48%
Independent	15	Shin Ji-ye	18,039	0.37%
Progressive	12	Song Myeong-suk	12,272	0.25%
Minsaeng	9	Lee Su-bong	11,196	0.23%
Mirae	8	Oh Tae-yang	6,483	0.13%
Independent	13	Chung Dong-hui	1,874	0.03%
Independent	14	Lee Do-yeop	1,664	0.03%
New United Liberal Democrats	10	Bae Yeong-gyu	634	0.01%
Total			4,867,442	100.00%
Voter turnout			58.19%	

=== 2022 ===
2022 Seoul mayoral election
Party	#	Candidate	Votes	Percentage
People Power	2	Oh Se-hoon	2,608,277	59.05%
Democratic	1	Song Young-gil	1,733,183	39.23%
Justice	3	Kwon Soo-joung	53,840	1.21%
Basic Income	4	Shin ji-hye	12,619	0.28%
Independent	5	Kim Gwang-jong	9,000	0.20%
Total			4,416,919	100.00%
Voter turnout			53.17%	

=== 2026 ===
Candidate	Party	Votes	%
Oh Se-hoon (incumbent)	People Power Party	2,575,819	49.22
Chong Won-o	Democratic Party	2,515,560	48.07
Kwon Yeong-guk	Justice Party	54,315	1.04
Yoo Ji-hye	Women's Party	43,967	0.84
Kim Jeong-cheol	Reform Party	43,321	0.83
Total		5,232,982	100.00
Valid votes		5,232,982	98.93
Invalid/blank votes		56,401	1.07
Total votes		5,289,383	100.00
Registered voters/turnout		8,319,134	63.58
People Power hold			
Source: National Election Commission

== See also ==
- Government of South Korea
- Politics of South Korea
