= Oh Se-hoon =

Mayor of Seoul (2006–2011, 2021–present)

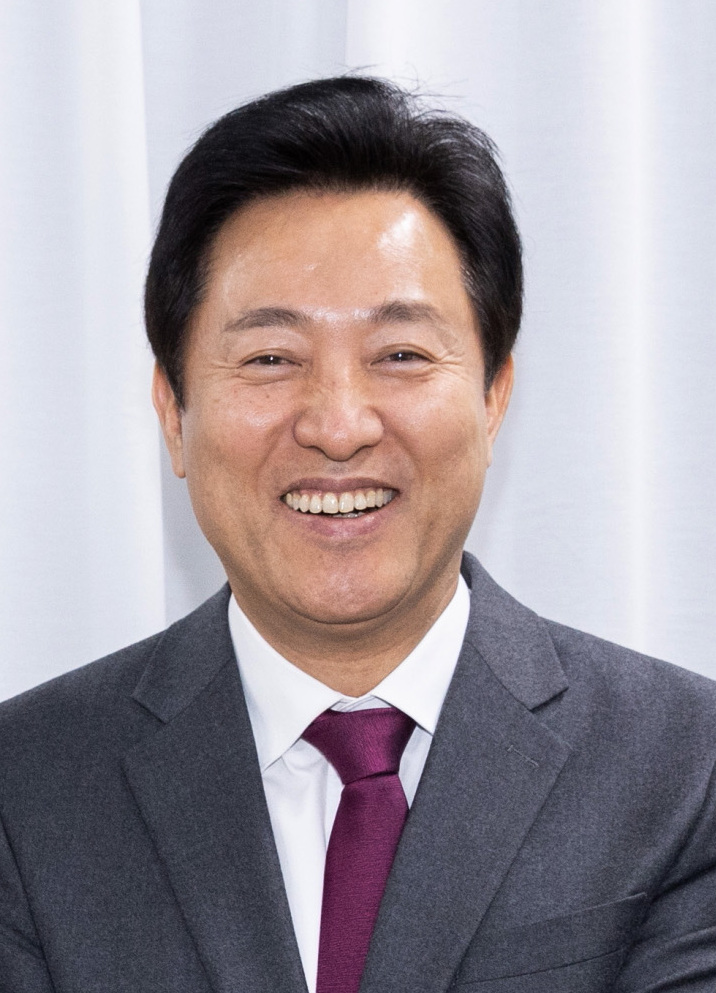
- Oh in 2023

33rd & 35th Mayor of Seoul
- Incumbent
- Assumed office 8 April 2021
- Preceded by: Park Won-soon; Seo Jung-hyup (acting)
- In office 1 July 2006 – 26 August 2011
- Preceded by: Lee Myung-bak
- Succeeded by: Kwon Yeong-gyu (acting); Park Won-soon

Member of the National Assembly
- In office 30 May 2000 – 29 May 2004
- Preceded by: Hong Sa-duk
- Succeeded by: Gong Sung-jin
- Constituency: Gangnam B (Seoul)

Personal details
- Born: 4 January 1961 (age 65) Seongdong District, Seoul, South Korea
- Party: People Power
- Other political affiliations: Bareun (2017–2018); Grand National·Saenuri·Liberty Korea (2000–2017, 2018–2020)
- Spouse: Song Hyeon-ok
- Children: 2
- Education: Korea University (LLB)
- Profession: Politician; lawyer
- Religion: Roman Catholic (Christian name: Stephen)

Military service
- Allegiance: South Korea
- Branch/service: Republic of Korea Army; Army Security Command
- Years of service: 1988–1991
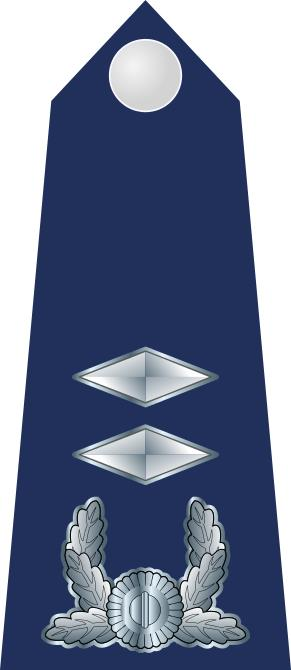
- Rank: Jungwi (First Lieutenant)

Korean name
- Hangul: 오세훈
- Hanja: 吳世勳
- RR: O Sehun
- MR: O Sehun

Oh Se-hoon (Korean: 오세훈; born 4 January 1961) is a South Korean politician and lawyer who has served as the Mayor of Seoul from 2006 to 2011 and since 2021. A member of the People Power Party, he served as a member of the National Assembly from 2000 to 2004.

== Early life and education ==
Oh was born on 4 January 1961 in Seongdong District, Seoul, South Korea. He graduated from Daeil High School and went on to study at Hankuk University of Foreign Studies. He then transferred, graduating from Korea University's School of Law. After passing the bar exam, he started practicing as an attorney. In 1994, he appeared on the MBC program Lawyer Oh and Lawyer Bae and gained popularity among the public.

Oh is Catholic and his baptismal name is Stephen.

== Early political career ==
In 2000, Oh was elected as a member of the 16th National Assembly. As a legislator, Oh led the "Future Alliance," a group of younger lawmakers within the Grand National Party, alongside Representatives Nam Kyung-pil, Won Hee-ryong, and Chung Byung-guk. Oh also served as secretary of the Special Committee on Political Reform, where he led efforts to revise three key election-related statutes, collectively known as the "Oh Se-hoon Election Laws."

== Mayoralties (2006–2011, 2021–present) ==
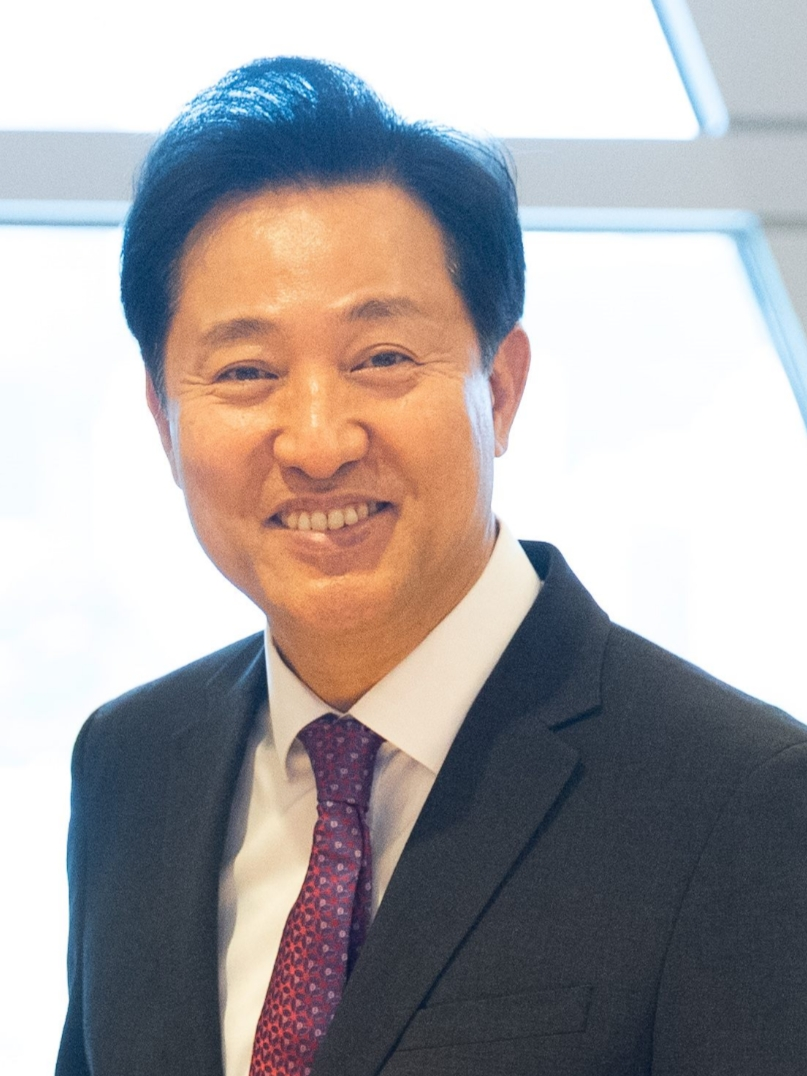
- Mayoralties of Oh Se-hoon
- First term July 1, 2006 – August 26, 2011
- Party: Liberty Korea
- Election: 2006; 2010
- Second term April 8, 2021 – present
- Party: People Power
- Election: 2021; 2022; 2026

=== First mayoralty (2006–2011) ===
On 1 July 2006, Oh began his first term as the Mayor of Seoul. Oh was re-elected to his second term in 2010 but resigned in 2011, partly due to the rejection of his proposal under the Seoul free lunch referendum.

During his tenure, Oh was involved with the Seoul Foundation for Arts and Culture, participating in a celebration video for the organization alongside foundation chairman Park Bum-shin and Seoul Arts Director Ahn Eun-mi. Dongdaemun Design Plaza was also constructed during his tenure.

==== Seoul City Water Project ====
Although most Seoul residents choose to drink bottled mineral water, it has been reported that Oh not only vouches for, but drinks the city tap water. Encouraging Seoul residents to drink tap water and reduce dependence on bottled water, as well as publicizing the cleanliness of Seoul tap-water, has been a pet project for Oh. From 2006 to 2011, Oh announced that he would make Seoul a city of water, and carried out the Han River Renaissance project to build riverside bike paths and Sebitseom floating islands on the southern bank of the Han by Banpo Bridge. Because he had initiated so much water-related initiatives, when severe floods occurred in 2011, 2022 and 2023, he was criticized with a nickname of Oseidon, a combination of his name and Poseidon.

=== Post first mayoralty ===
In 2012, Oh spent time in London, United Kingdom as a fellow in the Faculty of Social Science & Public Policy at King's College London, focusing on major cities around the world and seeking ways to create jobs and help promote economic growth.

Oh attempted to return to elected office in the 2016 South Korean legislative election, but his campaign was unsuccessful. In the 2020 legislative election, he ran in the Gwangjin District but was defeated by political newcomer Ko Min-jung.

Despite his electoral defeats, Oh remained a potential contender for the 2022 South Korean presidential election. In July 2020, he unveiled a series of housing and welfare policy proposals, including a "real estate trifecta" comprising a price cap on new apartments, the disclosure of construction costs, and a post-construction sales system. He also called for the large-scale supply of "half-price apartments" in Seoul and the easing of regulations on reconstruction and redevelopment.

=== Second mayoralty (2021–present) ===
In 2021, Oh won the People Power Party primary to become the party candidate for the Seoul mayoral by-election. He later won the election, defeating Democratic Party nominee Park Young-sun with 57.5 percent of the vote.

Oh began his third term on 8 April 2021. During the 2022 South Korean local elections, Oh secured his fourth term. In September 2023, Oh met with the mayor of New York City, Eric Adams in Manhattan, to deepen the cultural and economic ties between Seoul and New York City. This was his first official trip representing Seoul on the sidelines of the United Nations General Assembly meeting.

During the 2026 South Korean local elections, Oh ran for a fifth term as Mayor of Seoul. His campaign focused on checking the power of the ruling Democratic Party, which controlled both the presidency and a large portion of the National Assembly. Oh campaigned on the slogan of keeping Seoul the "last bastion" of political balance. To appeal to moderate voters, Oh also distanced himself from the People Power Party leadership. He publicly demanded that the PPP sever ties with former President Yoon Suk Yeol following Yoon's failed martial law declaration. While this created friction with party leadership, PPP Leader Jang Dong-hyeok ultimately issued an apology and Oh ran on the conservative ticket.

On 4 June 2026, Oh secured a historic fifth mayoral term in a highly competitive race during the 2026 South Korean local elections, narrowly defeating Democratic Party challenger Chong Won-o. Though an exit poll released jointly by major broadcasters KBS, MBC, and SBS put Chong ahead, Oh overcame a prolonged early lead during the final hours of ballot counting to pull ahead.

In his victory speech, Oh stated, "I express my deep respect and gratitude to the citizens who have preserved the balance of democracy in the name of Seoul."

== Political positions ==
=== LGBTQ rights ===
Oh stated he "personally can't agree with homosexuality".

When asked about the Seoul Queer Culture Festival during the 2021 Seoul mayoral race, Oh stated: "In a broader spectrum, the principle is that the rights of minorities, including sexual minorities, must be protected and there should be no discrimination. I of course agree that discrimination must be prohibited. But I think the debate was on the queer festival being held in the central area near City Hall and Gwanghwamun Square, and the city of Seoul has a special committee to make a decision, and there are rules to that as well. This is an issue to be decided with usage rules of the City Hall square, and this is not something that a mayor can individually decide."

Oh in 2022 said Seoul may prohibit the Seoul Queer Parade from using the city hall plaza if participants "exhibit indecent materials or overexpose their bodies."

In 2024, the Seoul Queer Parade was denied permission to gather at Seoul Plaza. Municipal authorities cited a book related festival as reason for the denial.

=== Nuclear weapons ===
Oh supports South Korea acquiring nuclear weapons in order to counter North Korea. In March 2023, during an interview with Reuters, he said that "we've come to a point where it is difficult to convince people with the logic that we should refrain from developing nuclear weapons and stick to the cause of denuclearisation".

=== Diplomatic cable ===
In a leaked diplomatic cable, it was reported that in Oh's discussion with Alexander Vershbow in 2006 he stated that a merger between the Grand National Party and the Democratic Party would be beneficial to the GNP.

=== Relations with President Yoon Suk Yeol ===
Despite being a member of the People Power Party of President Yoon Suk Yeol, Oh opposed Yoon's declaration of martial law on 3 December 2024.

== Electoral results ==
Year	Election	Post	Party affiliation	Votes	Percentage of votes	Results
2000	16th General Election	Member of National Assembly from Seoul Gangnam B	Grand National Party	64,516	59.39%	Won
2006	4th Local Election	Seoul (Mayoral Elections)	Grand National Party	2,409,760	61.05%	Won
2010	5th Local Election	Seoul (Mayoral Elections)	Grand National Party	2,086,127	47.43%	Won
2016	20th General Election	Member of National Assembly from Seoul Jongno	Saenuri Party	33,490	39.72%	Lost (2nd)
2020	21st General Election	Member of National Assembly from Seoul Gwangjin B	United Future Party	51,464	47.82%	Lost (2nd)
2021	2021 By-election	Seoul (Mayoral Elections)	People Power Party	2,798,778	57.50%	Won
2022	8th Local Election	Seoul (Mayoral Elections)	People Power Party	2,608,277	59.05%	Won
2026	9th Local Election	Seoul (Mayoral Elections)	People Power Party	2,575,819	49.22%	Won

== Writings ==
- 가끔은 변호사도 울고싶다 (When a Lawyer Wants to Cry) by Oh Se-hoon (Myeongjin Publishing, October 1995) ISBN 89-7677-030-7
- 우리는 실패에서 희망을 본다 (Failure Offers Seeds of Hope) by Kang Won-taek, Kim Ho-ghi, Oh Se-hoon, and Lee Young-jo (Hwanggeumgaji Publishing, August 2005) ISBN 89-8273-930-0

National Assembly of the Republic of Korea
Preceded by Hong Sa-duk	Member of the National Assembly for Gangnam B (Seoul); 30 May 2000 – 29 May 2004	Succeeded by Gong Sung-jin
Political offices
Preceded by Lee Myung-bak	Mayor of Seoul; 1 July 2006 – 26 August 2011	Succeeded by Kwon Yeong-gyu (acting); Park Won-soon
Preceded by Park Won-soon; Seo Jung-hyup (acting)	Mayor of Seoul; 8 April 2021 – present	Incumbent
