= Ministry of SMEs and Startups =

Government ministry of South Korea

- 중소벤처기업부

Agency overview
- Formed: July 26, 2017
- Preceding agency: Small and Medium Business Administration (1996-2017)
- Jurisdiction: Government of South Korea
- Headquarters: Sejong City
- Minister responsible: Lee So-young
- Deputy Ministers responsible: Noh Yong-seok; Lee Byoung-kwon
- Website: www.mss.go.kr

Korean name
- Hangul: 중소벤처기업부
- Hanja: 中小벤처企業部
- RR: Jungso bencheo gieopbu
- MR: Chungso pench'ŏ kiŏppu

The Ministry of SMEs and Startups (Korean: 중소벤처기업부) is a government ministry of South Korea. It was established in July 2017 by the Moon Jae-in government. It succeeds the former Small and Medium Business Administration. Its headquarters are located in Sejong City, Sejong. As of July 2026, the position of the Minister of SMEs and Startups has been vacant following the approval of Han Seong-sook, a former CEO of Naver Corporation and then-outgoing minister, as the new Prime Minister of South Korea.

== Mission ==
The South Korean Ministry of SMEs and Startups is dedicated towards supporting the innovation, growth and security of small-to-medium sized and micro enterprises. It follows various policies to improve the conditions for small and medium-sized businesses. It aims to reduce barriers through preventing legislation that may put an excess or unreasonable burden on small and medium enterprises. It does this through identifying such regulations and difficulties that interfere with the success of SMEs and Micro-Enterprises and attempting to resolve them.

The South Korean MSS also works to create a desirable business environment for SMEs and start-ups. In order to achieve this, the Ministry provides support for expanding the marketing structure for SME products through help with sales strategies, design development, etc. The Ministry also implements a public purchase program, which is intended to increase the amount of contracts signed between central and local governments, public corporations and institutions and SMEs. Furthermore, the Ministry provides growth support for tech startups, which includes a Tech Incubator Program for Start-ups that offers R&D funds, and assures that universities provide supportive infrastructures to students who consider creating their own startup. Additionally, the MSS implements policies that both help reduce the cost of failure and reorganise and rehabilitate SMEs.

The South Korean Ministry of SMEs and Startups also aims to promote shared growth between large companies and small and medium enterprises. For example, the Ministry implements the SME-suitable Industry Design Scheme which regulates entry of expansion of large enterprises. In order to achieve shared growth and create a sound business ecosystem, the Ministry works alongside a number of other ministries in order to lower taxes and ease regulations for start-up firms.

The MSS also helps to promote the overseas expansion of SMEs, as increased exports and domestic employment is heavily beneficial for their national economy. For example, the Ministry carries out the Export Voucher Programme which provides selected small and medium enterprises with support packages to aid in global expansion. Additionally, the Ministry offers a variety of online and offline programmes for SMEs wanting to expand into overseas markets.

The Ministry of SMEs and Startups has hosted COMEUP, a global startup event hosted in South Korea, since 2019. COMEUP 2020 focused on overcoming the impact COVID-19 had on businesses and hosted 59 Korean domestic startups and 61 overseas startups.

Furthermore, in order to improve the environment of traditional South Korean markets, the Ministry conducts fire safety inspections, aids in rehabilitation and provides shopping and delivery services to attract customers. Traditional markets are often encouraged by the MSS to remodel their layout, and receive support in improving facilities, rebuilding into more modern shopping sites and improving service quality. This support from the Ministry allows for traditional markets to flourish, attracting new customers and increasing customer retention.

Enterprises focusing on tech innovation are offered support through R&D cooperation networks between universities, research centres, and other businesses. The Ministry's Technical Dispute Mediation/Arbitration Committee aids SMEs to build adequate security systems for protection of their technologies. The Ministry is one of the organisers of the K-Startup Grand Challenge, held in Panggyo Techno Valley, a Korean government initiative offering accelerations programs and networking opportunities to foreign startups that want to enter the Korean market.

== Logos ==
1998~2006

2006~2009

2009~2016

2016~2017

2017~present

== Startup climate in South Korea ==
Reports show that Korea has become an attractive destination to international startups. In 2020, 2,648 overseas startups from 118 countries applied to participate in the K-Startup Grand Challenge, which showed an increase of 58% in comparison to application rates in 2019. South Korea has a strong domestic market with great purchasing power, making the country attractive to foreign entrepreneurs. According to the OECD, South Korea has the second-highest expenditures on R&D in the world, which is another pulling factor. Currently, small and medium-sized businesses account for 99% of all enterprises in South Korea, 88% of employment and 38% of national export.

== Laws surrounding SMEs in South Korea ==
Small and medium enterprises have played a fundamental role in South Korea's rapid economic development, making up 99.9% percent of businesses in the country and employing nearly 88% of the workforce. However, due to the power of chaebols and the government's tendency to focus resources on the development of chaebols internationally, policies to protect SMEs have, in the past, been lacking. This is now changing as the South Korean legal system is moving to promote and support SMEs in order to strengthen their economic role in the country's development.

On the official site of the Ministry of SMEs and Start-ups, some of the key laws surrounding SMEs and the purpose of these acts are listed as follows:

=== Framework Act on Small and Medium Enterprises ===
Provides direction-setting measures that foster the creative growth and industrial structure of SMEs and facilitate the balanced development of the national economy.

=== Act on Facilitation of Purchase of Small and Medium Enterprise-Manufactured Products and Support for Development of their Markets ===
Facilitates the purchase of SME-manufactured products to enhance the competitiveness of SMEs, increasing management stability and supporting the development of markets.

=== Act on Special Cases Concerning the Regulation of the Special Economic Zones for Specialised Regional Development ===
Systematically aids specialised regional development through methods tailored to the specific region, helping to stimulate regional economies and the growth of the national economy.

=== Act on the Protection of and Support for Micro Enterprises ===
Contributes to improving the social and economic status of micro enterprises by promoting independent business activities.

=== Act on Special Measures for the Promotion of Venture Businesses ===
Facilitates the industry's structural adjustment and promotes the establishment of venture businesses and conversion of existing enterprises into venture businesses.

=== Act on Support for Female-owned Businesses ===
Seeks economic gender equality by actively supporting the establishment and activities of female-owned businesses, elevating the status of businesswomen.

=== Act on the Fostering of Self-employed Creative Enterprises ===
Fosters self-employed creative enterprises by the promoting of the establishment of such enterprises by creatives.

=== Act on the Promotion of Collaborative Cooperation between Large Enterprises and Small and Medium Enterprises ===
Consolidates a 'win-win' type of cooperation between large enterprises and SMEs to increase competitiveness and attain shared growth, while laying a foundation of sustainable national economic development.

=== Act on the Promotion of Technology Innovation of Small and Medium Enterprises ===
Expands infrastructure to promote technological innovation in SMEs and establishes and implements related policies.

=== Promotion of Disabled Persons' Enterprise Activities Act ===
Proactively facilitates business start-ups and entrepreneurial activities of disabled persons, improving their economic and social status, and enhancing their economic strength.

=== Special Act on Support for Small Urban Manufacturers ===
Establishes a support system for the growth and development of small urban manufacturers and encourages their economic activity.

=== Small and Medium Enterprise Cooperatives Act ===
Concerns the establishment, management, and development of cooperative organisations, through which SMEs consolidate and promote collaborative projects, with the aim of providing equal economic opportunities to all SMEs and encouraging their independent economic activities.

=== Small and Medium Enterprises Promotion Act ===
Strengthen the competitiveness of SMEs through their structural advancement, and expand the business sphere for small and medium enterprises.

=== Special Act on Support for Human Resources of Small and Medium Enterprises ===
Promotes employment in SMEs through support for programs facilitating the supply and demand of human resources, upgrading human resource structure and improving awareness on SMEs.

=== Special Act on the Development of Traditional Markets and Shopping Districts ===
Facilitates the modernisation of the facilities and management of traditional markets and shopping districts in order to revitalise local business areas and contribute to national economic growth.

=== Special Act on the Promotion of Business Conversion in Small and Medium Enterprises ===
Promotes the business conversion of SMEs that suffer difficulties due to changes in the economic environment, enhancing competitiveness and upgrading the industrial structure.

=== Support for Small and Medium Enterprise Establishment Act ===
Facilitates the setting-up of SMEs and develops a firm basis for their growth, contributing to the establishment of a solid industrial structure.

=== Regional Credit Guarantee Foundation Act ===
Revitalises regional economies and contributes to the welfare of the population by establishing credit guarantee foundations which can guarantee obligations of SMEs and individuals short of security solvency in the district.

=== Act on Support for Protection of Technologies of Small and Medium Enterprises ===
Expands infrastructure and implements policies to protect the technology and technical competitiveness of SMEs.

=== Act on Special Cases Concerning Support for Technoparks ===
Clusters human and physical resources of enterprises, universities, research institutes, etcetera, in specific areas to jointly develop technology and to bring about regional innovation based on close connections and collaboration among such entities, thereby contributing to creating jobs, invigorating regional economies, and promoting national competitiveness.

=== Korea Technology Finance Corporation Act ===
Facilitates the financing of new business technology by stabilising and developing technology guarantee systems through the establishment of the Korea Technology Finance Corporation.
