= 2021 South Korean by-elections =

The 2021 South Korean by-elections were held in South Korea on 7 April 2021. The National Election Commission announced on 2 March 2021, that the by-elections would be held for 21 public offices or electoral districts, including 2 Metropolitan mayors, 2 Municipal mayors, 8 Metropolitan Council constituencies, and 9 Municipal Council constituencies. Candidate registration ran from 18 to 19 March, and the list of candidates was confirmed on 26 March.

Voters in the by-elections were able to access early voting from 06:00–18:00 KST on 2 and 3 April. One early voting place was established for each district or county of the region where the re-election was conducted, and voters could vote at any pre-voting place in the district where the re-election was conducted, regardless of their address. But on election day, voters had to vote at their designated polling place, and the voting time was from 6 a.m. to 8 pm.

The election concluded with the mayors of Seoul and Busan, which are the largest city and the second-largest city in South Korea, respectively, being selected via by-election. The two major political parties, the Democratic Party and the People Power Party, were concentrating on these by-elections, as they believed that the outcome would have a great impact on the 2022 presidential election. The Democratic Party's candidate Park Young-sun, endorsed by Kim Jinai (Open Democratic Party) and Cho Jung-hun (Transition Korea), became the unity candidate of the ruling coalition. For the opposition, the People Power Party's Oh Se-hoon became the unity candidate, endorsed by Ahn Cheol-soo (People Party) and Keum Tae-seop (Independent).

== Reasons for by-elections ==
The reasons and offices (constituencies) for by-elections are as follows:

=== Metropolitan mayors and governors ===
- Mayor of Seoul: Park Won-soon (Democratic), Incumbent died.
- Mayor of Busan: Oh Keo-don (Democratic), Incumbent resigned.

=== Municipal mayors ===
- Ulsan, Mayor of Nam District: Kim Jin-gyu (Democratic), Incumbent was removed from office by judge's ruling.
- South Gyeongsang, Mayor of Uiryeong county: Lee Seon-du (People Power), Incumbent was removed from office by judge's ruling

=== Members of Metropolitan Council ===
- Seoul, Gangbuk 1st electoral district : Kim Dong-sik (Democratic), Incumbent was removed from office by judge's ruling.
- Gyeonggi, Guri 1st electoral district : Seo Hyeong-ryeol (Democratic), Incumbent died.
- North Chungcheong, Boeun at-large electoral district: Park Jae-wan (Independent), Incumbent resigned.
- South Jeolla, Suncheon 1st electoral district: Kim Gi-tae (Democratic), Incumbent died.
- South Jeolla, Goheung 2nd electoral district: Park Geum-rae (Democratic), Incumbent died.
- South Gyeongsang, Goseong 1st electoral district: Lee Ok-cheol (Democratic), Incumbent was removed from office by judge's ruling.
- South Gyeongsang, Uiryeong at-large electoral district: Son Ho-hyeon (People Power), Incumbent resigned.
- South Gyeongsang, Hamyang at-large electoral district: Im Jae-gu (People Power), Incumbent died.

=== Members of Municipal Council ===
- Yeongdeungpo Council, Seoul – F electoral district: Heo Hong-seok (Democratic), Incumbent lost his/her right to be elected.
- Songpa Council, Seoul – D electoral district: Kim Jang-hwan (Democratic), Incumbent died.
- Ulju Council, Ulsan – B electoral district: Park Jeong-ok (Democratic), Incumbent died.
- Paju Council, Gyeonggi – A electoral district: Ahn So-hui (Progressive), Incumbent lost his/her right to be elected.
- Yesan Council, South Chungcheong – D electoral district: Yu Yeong-bae (People Power), Incumbent was removed from office by judge's ruling.
- Gimje Council, North Jeolla – B electoral district: On Ju-hyeon (Independent), Incumbent resigned.
- Boseong Council, South Jeolla – C electoral district: Chung Gwang-sik (Democratic), Incumbent lost his/her right to be elected.
- Uiryeong Council, South Gyeongsang – D electoral district: Son Tae-yeong (People Power), Incumbent resigned.
- Haman Council, South Gyeongsang – C electoral district: Kim Jeong-seon (People Power), Incumbent lost his/her right to be elected.

== Issues ==
=== Amendment of Democratic Party's constitution ===
The Democratic Party's constitution states that it cannot nominate any by-election candidates if the party caused the situation that made the by-election necessary. The Democratic Party held a vote On November 2nd, 2020 to amend the party's constitution, with almost 87 percent of the votes in favor of the change. The main opposition party, People Power Party, criticized the Democratic Party's decision, accusing it of revictimizing the women who were allegedly sexually harassed by the late mayor and former mayor. People Power Party interim leader Kim Jong-in said "President Moon is trying to reverse the so-called 'Moon Jae-in article', which was created while he was the party leader", calling on the president to publicly take a position on the envisioned revision of the party rules.

=== Resignation of Yoon Suk-yeol ===
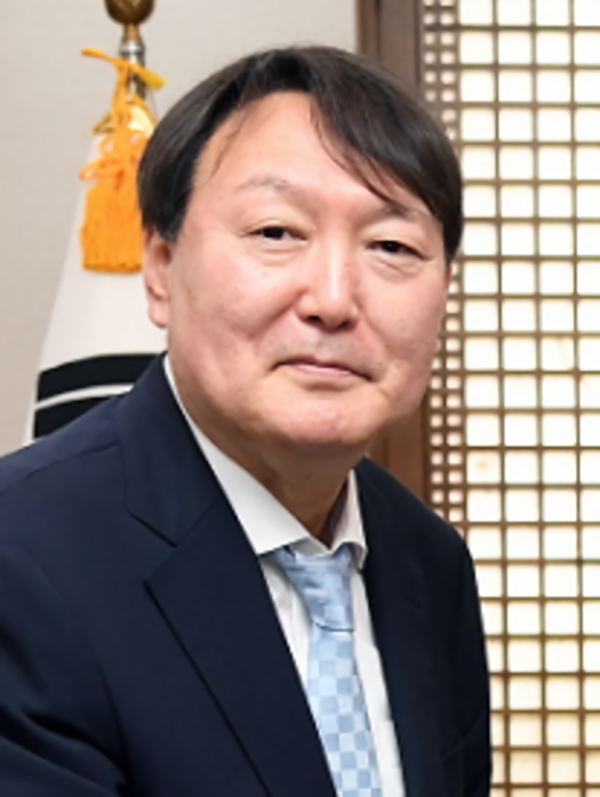
43rd Prosecutor General of South Korea Yoon Suk-yeol

The ruling Democratic Party have been speeding up the creation of a new investigative agency to weaken the power of the prosecution service. This move was followed by the establishment of Corruption Investigation Office for High-ranking Officials. Yoon Suk-yeol, who had clashed with the Moon administration and Democratic Party, publicly opposed the idea of separating powers of investigation and prosecution. Minister of Justice Park Beom-kye said he will gather various opinions from members of the prosecution on establishing an agency that would handle serious crimes. On 4 March 2021, Prosecutor General Yoon Suk-yeol announced his resignation in front of the Supreme Prosecutors' Office in protest against the government's push to weaken the power of the prosecution service. On the same day, President Moon Jae-in accepted the resignation.

Prime Minister Chung Sye-kyun has expressed regret over the resignation. The main opposition People Power Party's interim leader Kim Chong-in said he would meet with Yoon if he wants to. On the other hand, leader of the Democratic Party Lee Nak-yon has criticized Yoon, saying his resignation "out of the blue" was absurd for a public official. But, Democratic Party's approval rating plunged to a record low since the 2017 inauguration of the Moon Jae-in government. Gallup Korea said the decrease in the Democratic Party's approval rating apparently came with its recent conflict with former Prosecutor General Yoon Suk-yeol over creating a new investigative agency to take over the prosecution's investigative powers. Public support for Yoon Suk-yeol rose sharply to take the lead over other potential presidential candidates in South Korea. Some political critics analyzed that Yoon Seok-youl became a big variable in the 2021 by-elections.

=== LH scandal ===
A property speculation scandal involving employees in South Korea's top housing agency, the Korea Land & Housing Corporation (LH), emerged in March 2021, becoming a factor in the by-elections. The scandal involved 20 LH workers allegedly acting on insider information to buy undeveloped farmland near a new town development project in the Seoul region since April 2018, before the announcement of the project. There was public uproar as the scandal emerged amidst an ongoing housing affordability crisis in South Korea. Median apartment prices in Seoul have soared nearly 60% since President Moon came into office in May 2017, despite repeated property price cooling measures implemented by the Moon administration. As a result, President Moon's approval ratings sank to 34%, the lowest approval rating of his term after the scandal emerged along with the administration's clash with the prosecution.

== Mayor of Seoul ==
2021 Seoul mayoral by-election
- 7 April 2021

Seoul Metropolitan Mayor. Elected by simple majority using first past the post. Triggered by death of incumbent
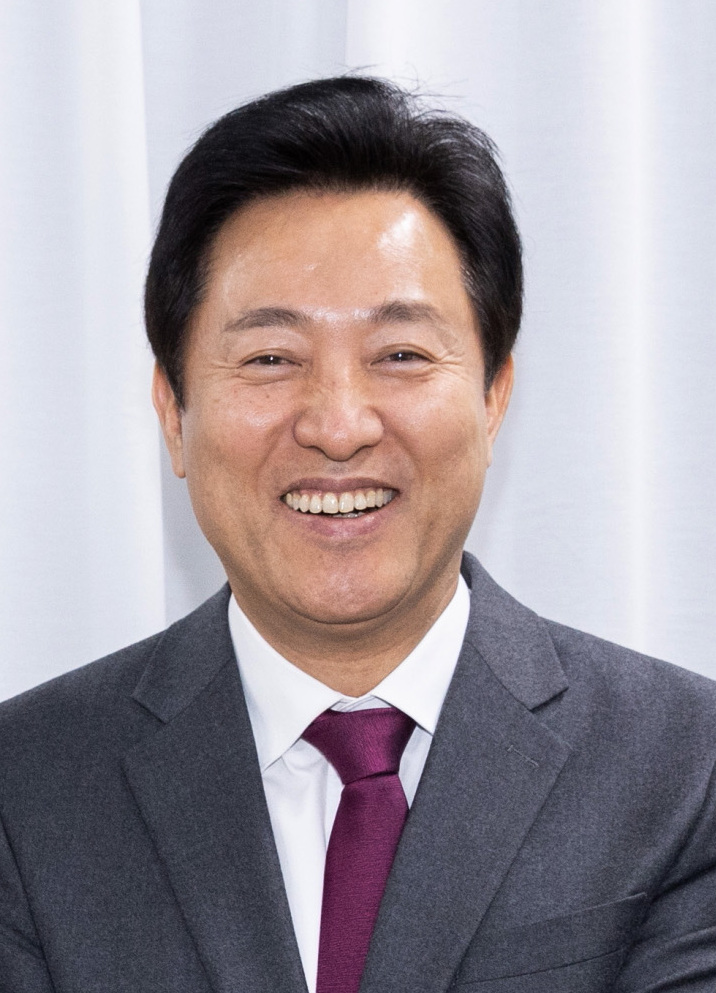

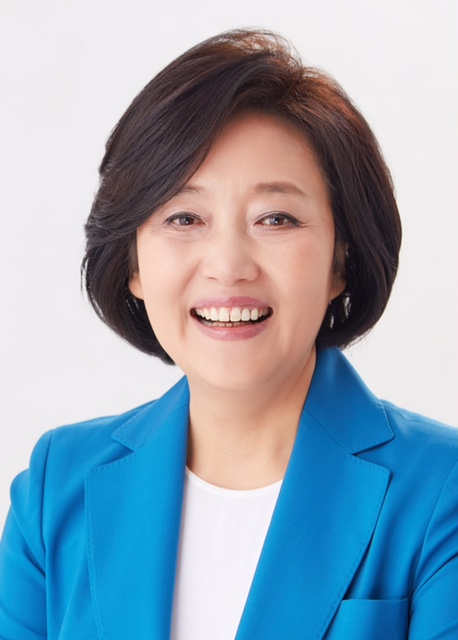
Candidate	Oh Se-hoon	Park Young-sun
Party	People Power	Democratic
Popular vote	2,798,788	1,907,336
Percentage	57.50%	39.18%
Mayor before election
Seo Jung-hyup (acting)
Independent
Elected mayor
Oh Se-hoon
People Power

=== Background ===
==== Death of Park Won-soon ====
The death of Park Won-soon, the longest serving mayor of Seoul, was impactful on the 2021 by-elections. Park Won-soon was a women's-rights activist. He opposed the previous administration in South Korea which was accused of human rights violations as college student and was imprisoned because of this. Park Won-soon was notable for winning South Korea's first sexual harassment case. Park Won-soon committed suicide after his female employee accused him of sexual harassment at age 65.

==== Increased attention of female candidates ====
Because of the sexual harassment incidents of incumbent mayors, each political party paid attention to female candidates. In December 2020, the majority of the potential candidates in Seoul are women, showing the rival parties' bid to promote themselves as women-friendly. Three women (Na Kyung-won, Cho Eun-hee and Lee Hye-hoon) from the main opposition People Power Party have announced their Seoul mayoral bids. The possible female candidates from the Democratic side are Minister of SMEs and Startups Park Young-sun and Anti-Corruption and Civil Rights Commission Chairwoman Jeon Hyun-hee. In addition, political parties are considering adding or increasing women's additional points to the primary rules. The Democratic Party maintained the existing 10–25% of the women's additional point, and the People Power Party decided to reflect the women's additional points at 10% in the main primary race and 20% in the preliminary primary race.

==== Connection between 2011 by-election and 2021 by-election ====
In 2011, South Korea held a by-election to fill vacant Seoul Mayor. Mayor Oh Se-hoon who was incumbent from 2006 to 2011 staked his mayoralty on Seoul free lunch referendum. Oh Se-hoon opposed to give free meals to all children, insisting that free lunch policy is "populism", and promised that he will resign if the outcome of referendum is not in favor of his 'selective' policy. However, the referendum which turnout have to be exceed one third of electorate was invalidated by low turnout. Eventually, Mayor Oh resigned on 26 August 2011, as promised and 2011 South Korean by-elections were held in Seoul for his replacement.

Park Won-soon, who become Mayor of Seoul for Oh Se-hoon's replacement, had started as the underdog at the early phase. Then, Independent frontline runner Ahn Cheol-soo who had been a strong supporter of Park Won-soon's famous civic group endorsed him for Mayor of Seoul. Thanks to the support of Ahn Cheol-soo, Park Won-soon overtaken Na Kyung-won, the frontline runner of the ruling Grand National Party, in a poll.

On 27 September 2011, Na Kyung-won who worked as the GNP's spokeswoman from 2006 to 2008 was nominated as the GNP candidate. Meanwhile, the opposition coalition unified the candidate. Independent candidate Park Won-soon, Democratic candidate Park Young-sun and Democratic Labor candidate Choi Gyu-yeop participated in the candidate unification primary, and Park Won-soon won the primary and became the nominee of the opposition coalition. On 26 October 2011, Park Won-soon was elected by 7.19%, winning 53.40% of the votes. On the other hand, Na Kyung-won won 46.21% of the votes and become second place. So, there is a saying that it is similar to the 2011 by-election in that Park Young-sun, Na Kyung-won, Oh Se-hoon, and Ahn Chul-soo, who were involved in the 2011 mayoral by-election, are running for the Seoul mayoral by-election in 2021.

=== Registered candidates ===
#	Party	Name	Date of birth	Career	Property (KRW, thousand)	Tax payment (KRW, thousand)	Criminal record	Note
1	Democratic Party of Korea	Park Young-sun	January 22, 1960 (age 66)	Fmr. Minister of SMEs and Startups; Fmr. Member of the National Assembly (2004–2020)	5,669,123	1,115,967	None	
2	People Power Party	Oh Se-hoon	January 4, 1961 (age 65)	Fmr. Mayor of Seoul (2006–2011); Fmr. Member of the National Assembly (2000–2004)	5,934,143	209,692	None	
~~4~~	~~People Party~~	~~Ahn Cheol-soo~~	~~January 22, 1962 (age 64)~~					Withdrew
6	Basic Income Party	Shin Ji-hye	October 22, 1987 (age 39)	Standing Leader of the Basic Income Party; Fmr. Teacher of the Poidong Inyeon Study	77,709	27,779	None	
7	National Revolutionary Party	Huh Kyung-young	July 13, 1947 (age 79)	Fmr. South Korean Presidential Candidate (1997 & 2007); Honorary President of the National Revolutionary Party	7,262,241	1,907,142	3 records: Traffic Accident Handling Special Act (fined KRW 1,000,000); Traffic Accident Handling Special Act/Road and Traffic Act (fined KRW 2,000,000); Defamation/Public Official Election Act (jailed for 1 year 6 months)	
8	Mirae Party	Oh Tae-yang	October 26, 1975 (age 51)	Leader of the Mirae Party; Fmr. Secretary-General of the Youth Party	0	159	1 record: Military Service Act (jailed for 1 year 6 months)	
9	Minsaeng Party	Lee Su-bong	June 23, 1961 (age 65)	Interim Leader of the Minsaeng Party (ERC); Fmr. Director of the Policy Institute of the KCTU	318,000	2,110	1 record: Assembly and Demonstration Act (jailed for 1 year)	
10	New United Liberal Democrats	Bae Yeong-gyu	February 25, 1961 (age 65)	Fmr. Chairman of the Sambu Construction; Legal Consultant of the Samsung Insurance	10,000	4,446	5 records: Real Estate Registration Special Measure Act (fined KRW 2,000,000); Trademark Act (fined KRW 1,000,000); Perjury (fined KRW 2,000,000); False accusation/Act on the registration of real right holder of real estate (sentenced to 8 years jail, but with 2 years of probation.); Fraud (sentenced to 1 year jail, but with 2 years of probation.)	
11	Women's Party	Kim Jin-ah	August 1, 1975 (age 51)	Fmr. Creative Director of the Innocean Worldwide; Writer of "I'm just looking for my pie, I'm not here to save humanity"	245,100	7,803	None	
12	Progressive Party	Song Myeong-suk	January 23, 1987 (age 39)	Co-Leader of the Progressive Party; Director of the Central Training Institute of the Progressive Party	-7,118	301	1 record: General traffic obstruction/Assembly and Demonstration Act (fined KRW 1,000,000)	
13	Independent	Chung Dong-hui	September 8, 1968 (age 58)	Writer of "Seoul Mayor, 12 Stars", "3 o'clock Korea" etc. Fmr. Candidate for South Korean National Assembly in Gangnam I (2020)	2,327,306	307,760	None	
14	Independent	Lee Do-yeop	June 14, 1984 (age 42)	Military Interpreter at Korean Augmentation To the United States Army (Sergeant); Writer of "Jyushinji"	112,900	0	None	
15	Independent	Shin Ji-ye	June 20, 1990 (age 36)	Leader of the Korean Women's Political Network; Fmr. Green Party Candidate for Seoul Mayor (2018)	0	3,473	None	
Source: National Election Commission

==== Candidate unification ====

Democratic Party Ticket
Park Young-sun
for Mayor

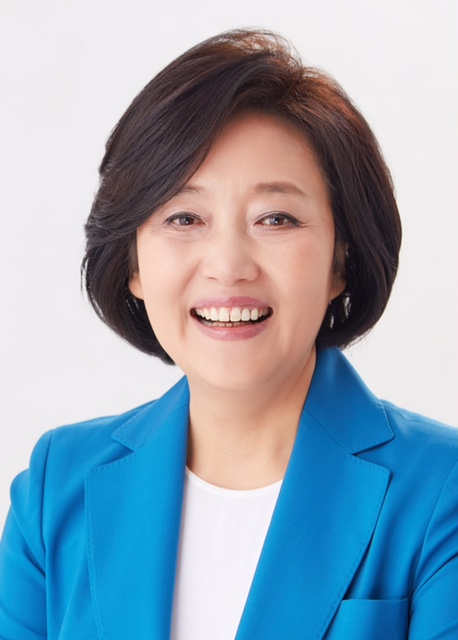

2nd
Minister of SMEs and Startups
(2019–2021)
Supported by
Kim Jinai (Open Democratic)
Cho Jung-hun (Transition Korea)
Campaign

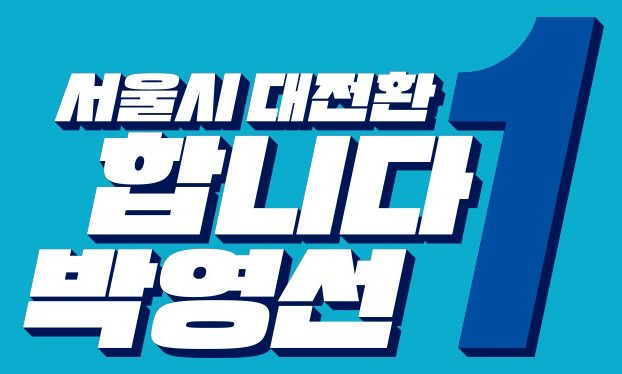

People Power Party Ticket
Oh Se-hoon
for Mayor

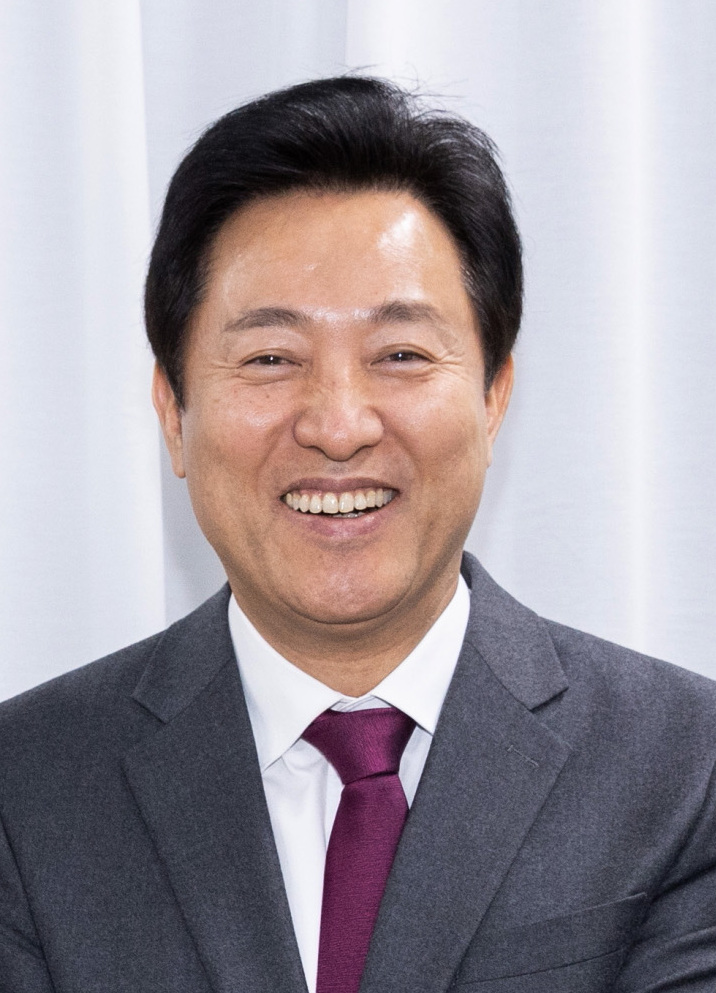

8th–9th
Mayor of Seoul
(2006–2011)
Supported by
Ahn Cheol-soo (People)
Keum Tae-seop (Independent)
Campaign

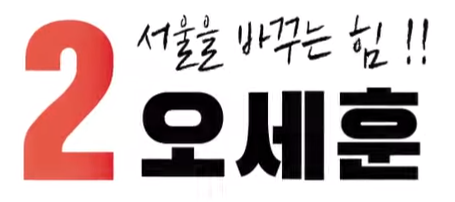

Because of first past the post voting, South Korean politicians often try 'candidate unification' by opinion polls not to split the voters of their side. In 2021 Seoul mayoral by-election, People Power Party, People's Party and Independent candidate Keum Tae-seop agreed to unify their candidacy. According to the procedure they agreed on, in the first phase, the independent Keum Tae-seop and the People's Party unites their candidacy, and the winner of the first stage unify with the People Power Party candidate in the second stage. Meanwhile, the ruling Democratic Party proposed unification to Open Democratic Party and Transition Korea. The candidates of each party expressed their stance in favor of the candidate unification.

As opposition coalition had announced their unified candidate on 23 March 2021, Seoul mayoral by-election became a two-way race between the pan-liberal candidate Park Young-sun and the pan-opposition candidate Oh Se-hoon.

==== Ruling coalition ====
Open Democratic Party candidate Kim Jinai announced her resignation from the National Assembly to run for Seoul Mayor on 2 March 2021, and demanded fair unification rule to the Democratic Party and their candidate Park Young-sun. Candidate Kim insisted on debating three times for unification, but the Democratic Party that worried about running out of time to promote their candidate balked at this idea.

On 8 March 2021, Democratic candidate Park Young-sun won the 1st round of candidate unification primary against Transition Korea candidate Cho Jung-hun. Details of the poll results were not released to the public.

On 17 March 2021, Park Young-sun defeated Open Democratic Party candidate Kim Jin-ae in 2nd round of unification primary.

==== Opposition coalition ====
On 4 February 2021, People Party Ahn Cheol-soo and Independent Keum Tae-seop began to discuss the details of their unification. Both sides agreed to hold a TV debate on 18 February, but there were some conflict over the details. In the debate, Ahn and Keum clashed over annual LGBTQ Pride parade. Keum Tae-seop asked Ahn if he would be willing to participate on Pride parade if elected as the mayor of Seoul. Ahn Cheol-soo opposed annual Pride parade in the Gwanghwamun area, saying "If we hold the Queer Festival in the Gwanghwamun area, there will be people voluntarily coming to see the festival there, but there are also others who have to be in the area for other reasons or who visit with their children. Their rights to refuse such things should be respected as well." Keum Tae-seop criticized Ahn's remarks in a radio interview the following day, saying he was disappointed as they lacked consideration for the basic human rights of the LGBTQ community. And the progressive Justice Party's Sexual Minority Committee criticized Ahn's view and demand an apology for LGBTQ people, stating "It is an open repression and oppression against LGBTQ people by who do not view LGBTQ as fellow citizens"

On 1 March 2021, Ahn Cheol-soo won the 1st round of candidate unification primary. Details of the poll results were withheld in accordance with the National Election Commission's guidelines. After that, Oh Se-hoon and Ahn Cheol-soo have met and discussed on the unification process. They said both sides agreed on the need to field a unified candidate and that it would be desirable to do so before the candidate registration period expires. On 16 March 2021, Ahn Cheol-soo said that he will seek to merge the People Party with People Power Party regardless of whether he defeats Oh Se-hoon in a unification primary. Ahn hoped his plan would help ease concerns that he would abandon the PPP after becoming the unified candidate and launch a third party with former Prosecutor General Yoon Seok-youl, who is one of the leading potential 2022 presidential candidate. But, on 18 March, the People Power Party and People's Party announced that they failed to make an agreement of procedures and other details before the registration period ends on 19 March.

On 19 March, Ahn Cheol-soo announced that he would accept the PPP's conditions. But, on the same day, Oh Se-hoon pointed out that it has not been clarified as to what degree Ahn is willing to accept, and raised an issue with remarks by the People's Party secretary general, who said the percentage of landline phone survey results will be negotiated and the survey will include questions on who is a better candidate in terms of competitiveness. The PPP had demanded 10 percent of the poll should be conducted through landline telephones and Ahn was known to have demanded the poll should only ask "competitiveness" of the candidates, not "adequacy". Eventually, Oh Se-hoon and Ahn Cheol-soo held a separate press conference at the same time on the same day. Oh Se-hoon announced that he will accept the Ahn's demand that all votes in the primary be cast via mobile phones and Ahn also announced that he will accept the PPP's demands on landline telephones. Some view this strange concession as a strategy to woo more voters to their side.

On 23 March, both campaigns jointly announced Oh Se-hoon's victory from two mobile surveys of a total 3,200 Seoul residents that evaluated the candidates' adequacy and competitiveness. Ahn Cheol-soo said he accepts the outcome, before vowing to work hard to help the unified opposition bloc win the election. Park Young-sun called Oh Se-hoon an outdated mayor who failed, while referring to herself as a mayor for the future.

=== Primary and Nomination ===
==== Democratic Party ====
Democrats are worried about by-elections as two metropolitan mayors of their party dead or resigned due to sexual allegations. The fact of the incident can not be confirmed as the investigation become impossible by death of Mayor Park, but it was said that it would be very disadvantageous to the Democratic Party. Moreover, since Seoul and Busan are the first and second cities in South Korea by population, one of the biggest concerns of the Democratic Party is that this by-election which will be unfavorable to them may affect the 2022 presidential election.

On 1 March 2021, Former Minister of SMEs and Startups Park Young-sun won the primary and become the Democratic Party nominee in 2021 Seoul mayoral by-election, defeating Assemblyman Woo Sang-ho.

2021 Seoul mayoral Democratic primary
Party	Candidate	Party members		Poll	SUM
Party	Candidate	Votes	%	%	%
Democratic	Park Young-sun	50,211	63.54	72.48	69.56
Democratic	Woo Sang-ho	28,814	36.46	28.52	30.44
Turnout		79,025	53.52		
Registered electors		147,642	100		

- Park Young-sun, Former Minister of SMEs and Startups (2019–2021), Former Member of the National Assembly Seoul Guro B – (Nominated)
- Woo Sang-ho, Former Floor Leader of the Democratic Party in the National Assembly, Former Member of the National Assembly from Seoul Seodaemun A
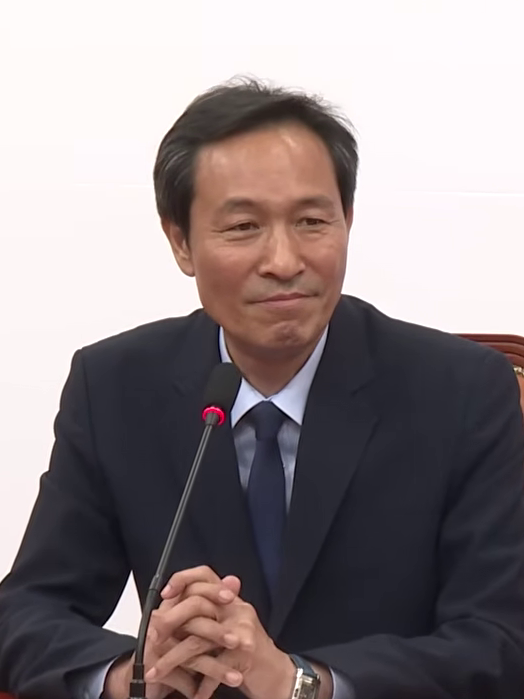
Former floor leader of the Democratic Party
Woo Sang-ho

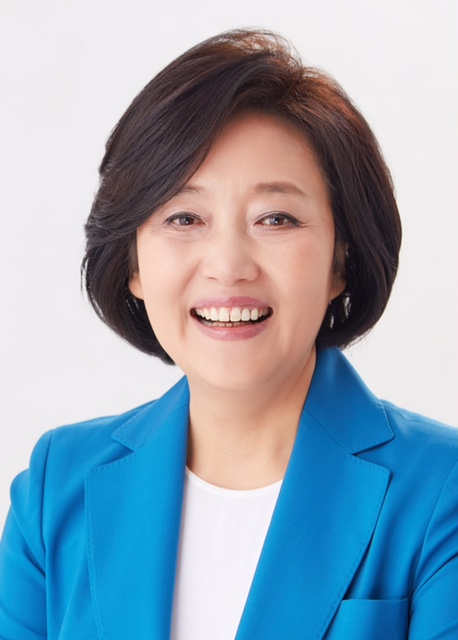
Former Minister of SMEs and Startups
Park Young-sun

==== People Power Party ====
On 4 March 2021, People Power Party announced the result and the winner of the primary. Former Seoul Mayor Oh Se-hoon was selected as the People Power Party's candidate to run 2021 Seoul mayoral by-election. Oh Se-hoon won 41.64 percent of the support and his primary rival Na Kyung-won won 36.31 percent.

2021 Seoul mayoral People Power Party primary
Party	Candidate	Poll (%)
People Power	Oh Se-hoon	41.64
People Power	Na Kyung-won	36.31
People Power	Cho Eunhee	16.47
People Power	Oh Shin-hwan	10.39

- Oh Se-hoon, Former Mayor of Seoul (2006–2011), Former Member of the National Assembly from Seoul Gangnam B – (Nominated)
- Oh Shin-hwan, Former Member of the National Assembly Seoul Gwanak B (2015–2020)
- Na Kyung-won, Former Floor Leader of the Liberty Korea Party in the National Assembly, Former Member of the National Assembly from Jung·Dongjak B
- Cho Eunhee, Mayor of Seocho (2018–present)
- Lee Hye-hoon, Former Member of the National Assembly Seoul Seocho A (withdrawn)
- Kim Geun-sik (eliminated)
- Kim Seon-dong, Former Secretary-General of the People Power Party, Former Member of the National Assembly Seoul Dobong B (eliminated)
- Lee Seong-hyeon, Former Member of the National Assembly from Seodaemun A (eliminated)
- Lee Jong-gu, Former Member of the National Assembly from Gangnam A (eliminated)
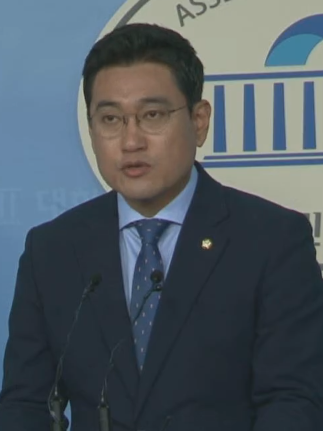
Former member of the National Assembly
Oh Shin-hwan

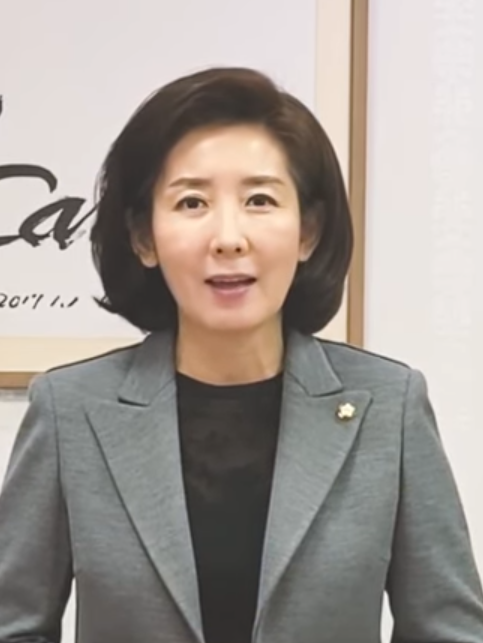
Former floor leader of the Liberty Korea Party
Na Kyung-won

Mayor of Seocho district
Cho Eun-hee

==== Justice Party ====
On February 3, 2021, Justice Party decided not to field candidates in the April mayoral by-elections after its leader was expelled for a sexual abuse scandal.

==== People's Party ====
- Ahn Cheol-soo, Chairman of the People's Party, Former Member of the National Assembly from Seoul Nowon C
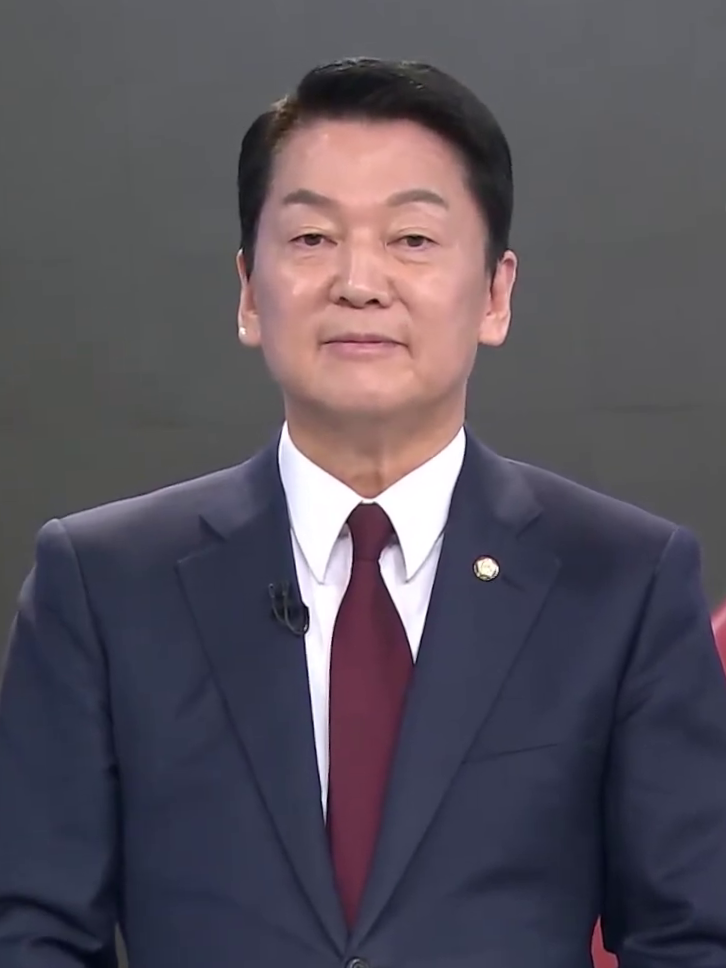
Chairman of the People's Party
Ahn Cheol-soo

==== Open Democratic Party ====
Kim Jin-ae was nominated as the candidate of Open Democratic Party on 9 February 2021. The Open Democratic Party announced on same day that Kim Jin-ae received 3660 votes (66.3%) out of the total number of votes 5518 in the primary, overtaking former lawmaker Chung Bong-ju. Chung Bong-ju won 1858 votes (33.7%).

- Kim Jin-ae, Member of the National Assembly from Proportional representation – (nominated)
- Chung Bong-ju, Former Member of the National Assembly from Seoul Nowon A
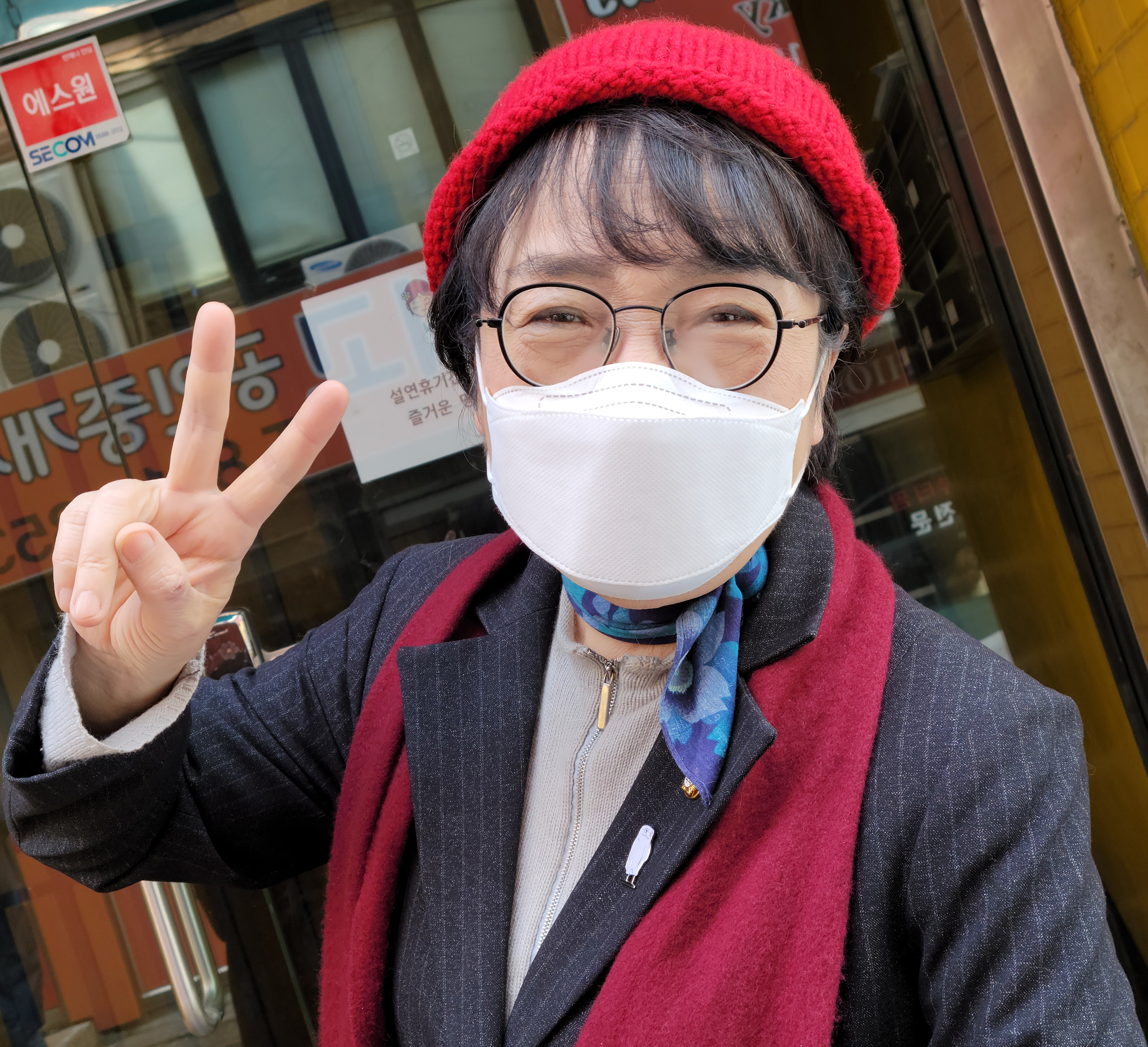
Member of the National Assembly
Kim Jin-ae

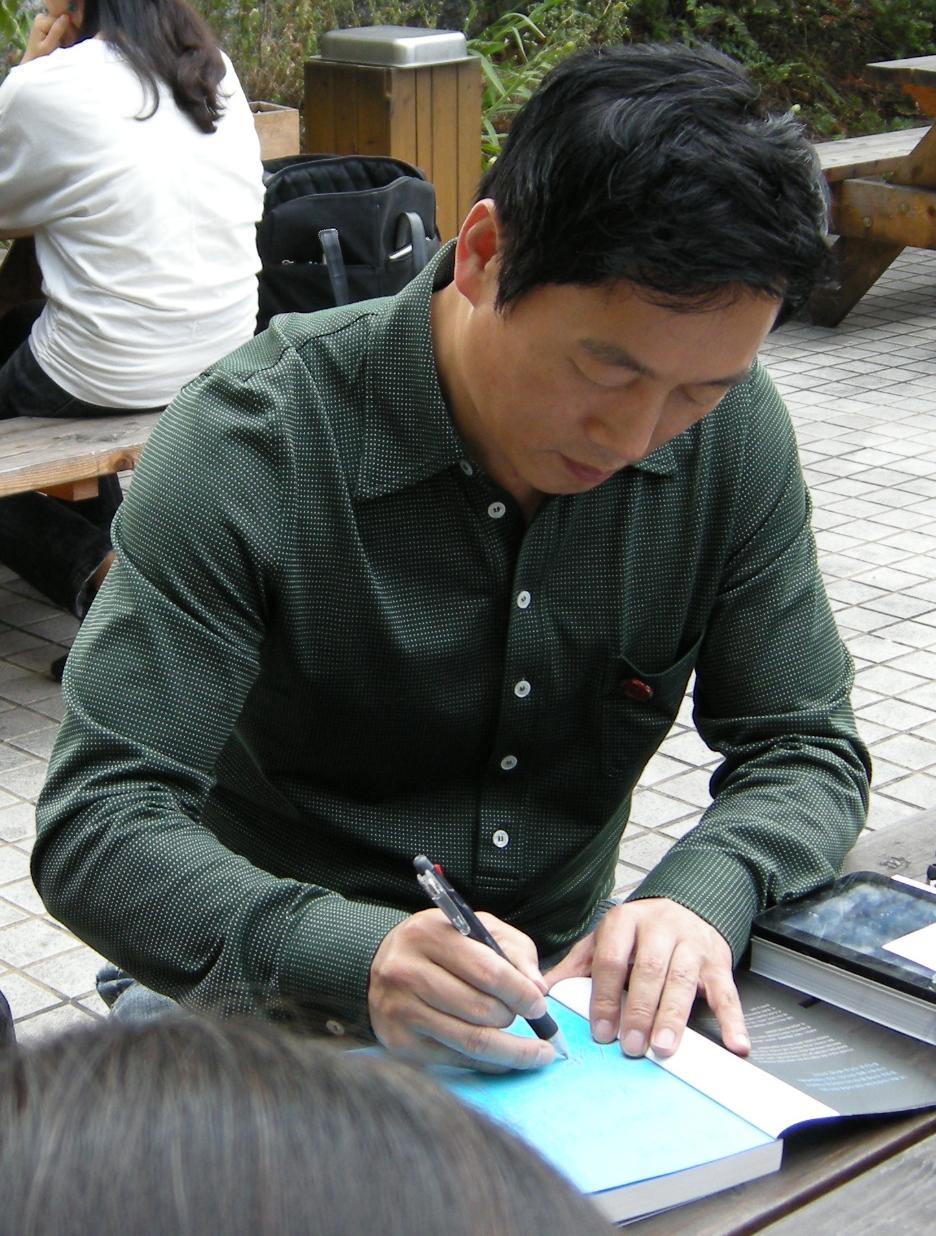
Former member of the National Assembly
Chung Bong-ju

==== Other parties ====
- Basic Income Party: Shin Ji-hye, Leader of the Basic Income Party, not to be confused with Green Party Korea's Shin Jiye, 2018 Seoul mayoral election candidate.
- Transition Korea: Cho Jung-hun, President of the Transition Korea
- Misaeng Party: Chung Dong-hui, writer
- Progressive Party: Song Myeong-suk, Co-Leader of the Progressive Party
- National Revolutionary Dividends Party: Huh Kyung-young, President of the National Revolutionary Dividends Party
- Our Future: Oh Tae-yang, President of the Our Future
- Women's Party: Kim Jin-ah, Co-Leader of the Women's Party

==== Independents ====
- Kim Dae-ho, Director of Social Design Research Institute
- Keum Tae-seop, Former Member of the National Assembly
- Shin Ji-ye, 2018 Green Party Korea candidate for Seoul Mayor

=== Debates ===
==== Major candidates ====
No.	Date and time	Host	Programme	Broadcaster	Presenter(s)	Viewer rating	Candidates			Link
P Participant A Absent invitee O Out of race (eliminated or withdrawn) N Non-invitee							Park Young-sun	Oh Se-hoon	Lee Su-bong	Link
1	29 March 2021; 22:40–24:20 KST	MBC	MBC 100min Debate	MBC	Chung Jun-hee	6.2%	P	P	N	Youtube
2	30 March 2021; 22:00–24:00 KST	National Election Commission	2021 Seoul Mayoral by-election invited candidate debate	KBS1/MBC	Park Tae-seo	8.7%	P	P	P	Website
3	5 April 2021; 14:00–15:30 KST	Korean Broadcasting Journalists Club	Korean Broadcasting Journalists Club invitational Debate	KBS1, MBC, SBS, YTN, MBN, CBS	Chung Kwan-yong	2.1%	P	P	N	Youtube

During the first televised debate, both candidate clashed with real estate issues and Moon Jae-in administration's anti-speculative policies amid LH scandal. Park Young-sun raised allegations against Oh Se-hoon that he received 3.65 billion KRW in 2009 in compensation for land in Seoul's Seocho district, after his involvement in the area being designated a residential zone. Oh Se-hoon denied that he was aware of the land under his wife's name or the development plan. Oh Se-hoon then attacked Moon administration's housing policies aimed at curbing soaring housing prices, saying the government policies have only served to exacerbate the problem and start a vicious economic cycle. Park Young-sun acknowledged some failure in the policies and said she will introduce new measures.

During the second debate, Park Young-sun continued interrogating Oh Se-hoon on the suspicion of his land compensation. Park argued that Oh should have known as the mayor at that time. She also pointed out that the residences of then President Lee Myung-bak and his brother Lee Sang-deuk, then a ruling party politician, were located nearby and raised suspicions that the decision to develop the area was also aimed at benefiting them. Oh denied again her claim, saying the decision was made by the director-general of Seoul at that time, not him. He said there's no need to be briefed to him, because the housing plan had been discussed since he become Seoul Mayor. Oh then criticized Park over the controversy that she and her husband purchased a residence in Tokyo, to which Park responded by accusing him of raising it to divert attention away from the suspicions directed at him.

The last debate were held on Monday, 5 April 2021, by Korea Broadcasting Journalists Club. Oh Se-hoon criticized that Park Young-sun's housing plans are unrealistic and unachievable. Park Young-sun argued during the debate that he lied about the controversial land development project, which allegedly benefited his wife and her family. Then, Oh said Park's candidacy itself is a lie by the ruling party, which had promised not to produce a candidate for a by-election made necessary due to its elected members' indiscretion while in office.

==== Minor candidates ====
No.	Date and time	Host	Programme	Broadcaster	Presenter(s)	Candidates									Link
P Participant A Absent invitee O Out of race (eliminated or withdrawn) N Non-invitee						Shin Ji-hye	Huh Kyoung-young	Oh Tae-yang	Bae Yeong-hyu	Kim Jin-ah	Song Myeong-suk	Chung Dong-hui	Lee Do-yeop	Shin Ji-ye	Link
1	29 March 2021; 14:30–16:30 KST	National Election Commission	2021 Seoul Mayoral by-election non-invited candidate debate	KBS1/MBC	Lee Kyu-won	P	P	P	P	P	P	P	P	P	Website

=== Polling ===
Poll source	Client	Date(s) administered	Method	Sample size	Margin of Error	Park Young-sun	Oh Se-hoon	Ahn Cheol-soo	Huh Kyung-young	Kim Jin-ah	Song Myeong-suk	Shin Ji-ye	Others	None	Don't know or no answer
IPSOS/Korea/Hankook	KBS/MBC/SBS	20–21 March 2021	LI(M-VN)	1,006	95%, ±3.1%p	27.3%	30.2%	24.0%	0.6%	0.2%	0.1%	0.2%	1.0%	17.4%	1.8%
For more information, visit the National Election Survey Deliberation Committee

Poll source	Client	Date(s) administered	Method	Sample size	Margin of Error	Park Young-sun	Woo Sang-ho	Ahn Cheol-soo	Oh Se-hoon	Na Kyoung-won	Cho Eun-hee	Keum Tae-seop	Kim Jin-ai	Others	None	Don't know or no answer
Next Research	SBS	13 March 2021	LI(M-VN)	1,008	95%, ±3.1%p	27.4%	–	24.0%	26.1%	–	–	–	2.4%	1.0%	17.4%	1.8%
Hankook Research	KBS	8–9 March 2021	LI(M-VN)	800	95%, ±3.5%p	30.5%	–	22.4%	23.1%	–	–	–	2.1%	1.6%	11.1%	9.1%
Embrain Public	News1	7–8 March 2021	LI(M-VN)	1,009	95%, ±3.1%p	33.3%	–	23.4%	24.6%	–	–	–	2.9%	1.5%	11.2%	3.1%
WinG Korea	Asia Economy	6–7 March 2021	ARS(M-VN)	1,002	95%, ±3.1%p	30.3%	–	24.7%	27.9%	–	–	–	4.1%	2.3%	8.0%	2.0%
Realmeter	MBC 100min Debate	19–20 February 2021	ARS (M-VN 80%, L-RDD 20%)	1,030	95%, ±3.1%p	31.1%	7.3%	23.2%	9.4%	14.2%	1.9%	1.9%	2.5%	1.5%	5.3%	1.6%
Realmeter	TBS, YTN	7–8 February 2021	LI 50%, ARS 50% (M-RDD 80%, L-RDD 20%)	1,016	95%, ±3.1%p	26.2%	7.7%	19.0%	9.4%	15.1%	2.8%	1.4%	1.3%	2.8%	11.5%	2.7%
For more information, visit the National Election Survey Deliberation Committee

Virtual polling (two-way)

Poll source	Client	Date(s) administered	Method	Sample size	Margin of Error	Woo Sang-ho	Park Young-sun	Ahn Cheol-soo	Oh Se-hoon	Na Kyoung-won	Others	None	Don't know or no answer
IPSOS/Korea/Hankook	KBS/MBC/SBS	20–21 March 2021	LI(M-VN)	1,006	95%, ±3.1%p	–	30.4%	–	47.0%	–	3.3%	16.1%	4.1%
IPSOS/Korea/Hankook	KBS/MBC/SBS	20–21 March 2021	LI(M-VN)	1,006	95%, ±3.1%p	–	29.9%	45.9%	–	–	2.7%	17.7%	4.0%
IPSOS	JoongAng Ilbo	19–20 March 2021	ARS (M-VN 15.2% L-RDD 84.8%)	1,002	95%, ±3.1%p	–	36.8%	–	50.6%	–	1.5%	9.4%	1.8%
IPSOS	JoongAng Ilbo	19–20 March 2021	ARS (M-VN 15.2% L-RDD 84.8%)	1,002	95%, ±3.1%p	–	35.6%	52.3%	–	–	1.2%	10.0%	0.9%
Realmeter	Munhwa Ilbo	13–14 March 2021	ARS (M-RDD 80% L-RDD 20%)	1,030	95%, ±3.1%p	–	37.4%	–	54.5%	–	3.6%	3.0%	1.5%
Realmeter	Munhwa Ilbo	13–14 March 2021	ARS (M-RDD 80% L-RDD 20%)	1,030	95%, ±3.1%p	–	37.8%	55.3%	–	–	2.9%	2.2%	1.8%
PNR	Mirae Hankook Research; Aju Business Daily	14 March 2021	ARS (M-VN 84% L-RDD 16%)	806	95%, ±3.5%p	–	34.1%	–	47.7%	–	8.1%	6.6%	3.5%
PNR	Mirae Hankook Research; Aju Business Daily	14 March 2021	ARS (M-VN 84% L-RDD 16%)	806	95%, ±3.5%p	–	33.0%	50.8%	–	–	8.4%	5.4%	2.5%
Kanta Korea	The Chosun Ilbo/TV Chosun	13 March 2021	ARS(M-VN)	806	95%, ±3.5%p	–	34.2%	–	46.5%	–	0.6%	3.8%	14.9%
Kanta Korea	The Chosun Ilbo/TV Chosun	13 March 2021	ARS(M-VN)	806	95%, ±3.5%p	–	33.8%	45.2%	–	–	1.9%	3.2%	15.9%
STI	STI	12–13 March 2021	ARS(M-VN)	1,000	95%, ±3.1%p	–	33.1%	–	51.8%	–	8.0%	4.9%	2.4%
STI	STI	12–13 March 2021	ARS(M-VN)	1,000	95%, ±3.1%p	–	32.3%	53.7%	–	–	5.7%	5.8%	2.4%
Next Research	SBS	13 March 2021	LI(M-VN)	1,008	95%, ±3.1%p	–	35.0%	–	42.3%	–	3.9%	17.2%	1.5%
Next Research	SBS	13 March 2021	LI(M-VN)	1,008	95%, ±3.1%p	–	33.6%	–	45.4%	–	2.2%	17.7%	1.1%
PNR	Mirae Hankook Research/ Money Today	13 March 2021	ARS (M-VN 81% L-RDD 19%)	802	95%, ±3.5%p	–	36.1%	46.2%	–	–	9.1%	5.7%	3.0%
PNR	Mirae Hankook Research/ Money Today	13 March 2021	ARS (M-VN 81% L-RDD 19%)	802	95%, ±3.5%p	–	34.8%	46.7%	–	–	9.8%	5.2%	3.5%
Hankook Research	KBS	8–9 March 2021	LI(M-VN)	800	95%, ±3.5%p	–	39.5%	–	44.3%	–	2.3%	9.1%	4.9%
Hankook Research	KBS	8–9 March 2021	LI(M-VN)	800	95%, ±3.5%p	–	37.0%	44.9%	–	–	2.8%	10.0%	5.4%
Embrain Public	News1	7–8 March 2021	LI(M-VN)	1,009	95%, ±3.1%p	–	38.7%	46.2%	–	–	1.5%	10.4%	3.2%
Embrain Public	News1	7–8 March 2021	LI(M-VN)	1,009	95%, ±3.1%p	–	39.3%	–	43.1%	–	1.9%	12.3%	3.4%
WinG Korea	Asia Economy	6–7 March 2021	ARS(M-VN)	1,002	95%, ±3.1%p	–	38.8%	49.2%	–	–	4.5%	5.4%	2.0%
WinG Korea	Asia Economy	6–7 March 2021	ARS(M-VN)	1,002	95%, ±3.1%p	–	39.5%	–	49.3%	–	2.9%	6.3%	2.0%
IPSOS	JoongAng Daily	5–6 March 2021	LI (L-RDD 14.9% M-VN 85.1%)	1,004	95%, ±3.1%p	–	41.6%	–	45.3%	–	1.5%	10.6%	1.0%
IPSOS	JoongAng Daily	5–6 March 2021	LI (L-RDD 14.9% M-VN 85.1%)	1,004	95%, ±3.1%p	–	39.8%	47.3%	–	–	1.2%	10.7%	0.9%
4 March 2021			People Power Party's nomination										
1 March 2021			Democratic Party's nomination										
RnSearch	Daehan Economic	25–26 February 2021	ARS(M-VN)	818	95%, ±3.4%p	–	34.1%	36.7%	–	–	16.3%	10.6%	2.0%
RnSearch	Daehan Economic	25–26 February 2021	ARS(M-VN)	818	95%, ±3.4%p	–	35.8%	–	–	35.2%	13.0%	12.8%	3.2%
RnSearch	Daehan Economic	25–26 February 2021	ARS(M-VN)	818	95%, ±3.4%p	–	35.4%	–	33.4%	–	15.6%	13.1%	2.4%
Hangil Research	MBN	15–16 February 2021	ARS(M-VN)	807	95%, ±3.4%p	–	39.0%	–	–	27.2%	20.5%	11.3%	1.9%
Hangil Research	MBN	15–16 February 2021	ARS(M-VN)	807	95%, ±3.4%p	–	39.5%	–	27.0%	–	18.1%	13.7%	1.7%
Hangil Research	MBN	15–16 February 2021	ARS(M-VN)	807	95%, ±3.4%p	–	39.3%	39.4%	–	–	18.1%	13.7%	1.7%
IPSOS	SBS	6–9 February 2021	LI (L-RDD 10% M-VN 90%)	800	95%, ±3.5%p	–	43.7%	–	–	33.7%	7.7%	14.5%	0.5%
IPSOS	SBS	6–9 February 2021	LI (L-RDD 10% M-VN 90%)	800	95%, ±3.5%p	–	45.1%	–	33.0%	–	8.0%	13.4%	0.5%
IPSOS	SBS	6–9 February 2021	LI (L-RDD 10% M-VN 90%)	800	95%, ±3.5%p	–	40.6%	43.5%	–	–	3.7%	11.5%	0.6%
IPSOS	SBS	6–9 February 2021	LI (L-RDD 10% M-VN 90%)	800	95%, ±3.5%p	35.7%	–	–	–	36.3%	7.6%	20.2%	0.3%
IPSOS	SBS	6–9 February 2021	LI (L-RDD 10% M-VN 90%)	800	95%, ±3.5%p	35.3%	–	–	37.7%	–	7.2%	19.5%	0.2%
IPSOS	SBS	6–9 February 2021	LI (L-RDD 10% M-VN 90%)	800	95%, ±3.5%p	33.0%	–	46.9%	–	–	4.4%	15.4%	0.4%
KRi	MBC	8–9 February 2021	LI(M-VN)	804	95%, ±3.5%p	–	46.0%	–	–	33.7%	0.2%	18.4%	1.6%
KRi	MBC	8–9 February 2021	LI(M-VN)	804	95%, ±3.5%p	–	45.3%	–	36.1%	–	0.7%	16.3%	1.6%
KRi	MBC	8–9 February 2021	LI(M-VN)	804	95%, ±3.5%p	–	41.9%	41.4%	–	–	0.4%	14.6%	1.8%
KRi	MBC	8–9 February 2021	LI(M-VN)	804	95%, ±3.5%p	33.9%	–	–	–	37.9%	0.7%	26.4%	1.1%
KRi	MBC	8–9 February 2021	LI(M-VN)	804	95%, ±3.5%p	31.0%	–	–	41.8%	–	0.5%	25.0%	1.6%
KRi	MBC	8–9 February 2021	LI(M-VN)	804	95%, ±3.5%p	29.3%	–	44.7%	–	–	0.9%	23.4%	1.8%
Realmeter	TBS, YTN	7–8 February 2021	LI 50%, ARS 50% (M-RDD 80%, L-RDD 20%)	1,016	95%, ±3.1%p	–	39.7%	–	–	34.0%	6.2%	16.8%	3.3%
Realmeter	TBS, YTN	7–8 February 2021	LI 50%, ARS 50% (M-RDD 80%, L-RDD 20%)	1,016	95%, ±3.1%p	–	38.9%	36.3%	–	–	5.7%	15.9%	3.2%
Realmeter	TBS, YTN	7–8 February 2021	LI 50%, ARS 50% (M-RDD 80%, L-RDD 20%)	1,016	95%, ±3.1%p	–	40.6%	–	29.7%	–	7.2%	18.5%	4.0%
Realmeter	TBS, YTN	7–8 February 2021	LI 50%, ARS 50% (M-RDD 80%, L-RDD 20%)	1,016	95%, ±3.1%p	29.1%	–	–	–	34.4%	7.5%	26.3%	2.7%
Realmeter	TBS, YTN	7–8 February 2021	LI 50%, ARS 50% (M-RDD 80%, L-RDD 20%)	1,016	95%, ±3.1%p	28.2%	–	40.4%	–	–	5.5%	23.0%	3.0%
Realmeter	TBS, YTN	7–8 February 2021	LI 50%, ARS 50% (M-RDD 80%, L-RDD 20%)	1,016	95%, ±3.1%p	30.6%	–	–	32.7%	–	5.5%	23.0%	3.0%
Embrain Public	Munhwa Ilbo	5–6 February 2021	LI(M-VN)	800	95%, ±3.46%p	–	43.1%	–	–	36.1%	2.5%	16.7%	1.6%
Embrain Public	Munhwa Ilbo	5–6 February 2021	LI(M-VN)	800	95%, ±3.46%p	–	37.7%	46.6%	–	–	1.5%	12.4%	1.8%
Embrain Public	Munhwa Ilbo	5–6 February 2021	LI(M-VN)	800	95%, ±3.46%p	–	42.3%	39.3%	–	–	1.6%	14.4%	2.4%
Hankook Research	Hankook Ilbo	4–6 February 2021	LI(M-VN)	800	95%, ±3.5%p	–	41.1%	–	–	41.3%	9.0%	2.7%	6.0%
Hankook Research	Hankook Ilbo	4–6 February 2021	LI(M-VN)	800	95%, ±3.5%p	–	40.8%	–	41.8%	–	9.0%	1.9%	6.6%
Hankook Research	Hankook Ilbo	4–6 February 2021	LI(M-VN)	800	95%, ±3.5%p	–	39.2%	46.0%	–	–	7.4%	2.2%	5.1%
Hankook Research	Hankook Ilbo	4–6 February 2021	LI(M-VN)	800	95%, ±3.5%p	33.5%	–	–	–	44.9%	11.6%	3.7%	6.2%
Hankook Research	Hankook Ilbo	4–6 February 2021	LI(M-VN)	800	95%, ±3.5%p	32.5%	–	–	46.0%	–	11.5%	3.7%	6.3%
Hankook Research	Hankook Ilbo	4–6 February 2021	LI(M-VN)	800	95%, ±3.5%p	31.2%	–	50.4%	–	–	9.5%	3.1%	5.8%
Jowon C&I	Sisa Journal	1–2 February 2021	ARS(M-VN)	1,000	95%, ±3.1%p	–	41.7%	–	–	33.7%	9.9%	10.0%	4.8%
Jowon C&I	Sisa Journal	1–2 February 2021	ARS(M-VN)	1,000	95%, ±3.1%p	–	41.0%	36.8%	–	–	7.8%	9.5%	4.9%
For more information, visit the National Election Survey Deliberation Committee

Virtual polling (three-way)

Poll source	Client	Date(s) administered	Method	Sample size	Margin of Error	Woo Sang-ho	Park Young-sun	Ahn Cheol-soo	Oh Se-hoon	Na Kyoung-won	Others	None	Don't know or no answer
IPSOS	JoongAng Ilbo	19–20 March 2021	ARS (M-VN 15.2% L-RDD 84.8%)	1,002	95%, ±3.1%p	–	32.9%	23.2%	32.3%	–	1.0%	8.0%	2.7%
Realmeter	Munhwa Ilbo	13–14 March 2021	ARS (M-RDD 80% L-RDD 20%)	1,030	95%, ±3.1%p	–	33.3%	25.1%	35.6%	–	2.3%	2.2%	1.5%
PNR	Mirae Hankook Research/ Aju Business Daily	14 March 2021	ARS (M-VN 84% L-RDD 16%)	806	95%, ±3.5%p	–	30.7%	26.1%	34.7%	–	2.7%	4.8%	1.0%
Kanta Korea	The Chosun Ilbo/TV Chosun	13 March 2021	ARS(M-VN)	806	95%, ±3.5%p	–	28.8%	27.2%	19.9%	–	2.1%	5.0%	17.0%
PNR	Mirae Hankook Research/ Money Today	13 March 2021	ARS(M-VN 81% L-RDD 19%)	802	95%, ±3.5%p	–	33.0%	32.5%	27.9%	–	3.3%	2.1%	1.2%
Hankook Research	KBS	8–9 March 2021	LI(M-VN)	800	95%, ±3.5%p	–	35.0%	25.4%	24.0%	–	2.1%	8.0%	5.5%
Embrain Public	News1	7–8 March 2021	LI(M-VN)	1,009	95%, ±3.1%p	–	35.8%	26.0%	25.4%	–	1.4%	9.3%	2.1%
IPSOS	JoongAng Daily	5–6 March 2021	LI (L-RDD 14.9% M-VN 85.1%)	1,004	95%, ±3.1%p	–	35.8%	24.2%	26.4%	–	1.7%	9.3%	2.5%
Hangil Research	MBN	15–16 February 2021	ARS(M-VN)	804	95%, ±3.4%p	–	37.8%	27.9%	–	20.8%	6.8%	5.2%	1.6%
Hangil Research	MBN	15–16 February 2021	ARS(M-VN)	804	95%, ±3.4%p	–	39.3%	31.3%	16.1%	–	6.6%	5.6%	1.0%
KRi	MBC	8–9 February 2021	LI(M-VN)	804	95%, ±3.5%p	–	39.7%	27.1%	–	19.2%	0.4%	12.4%	1.3%
KRi	MBC	8–9 February 2021	LI(M-VN)	804	95%, ±3.5%p	–	38.7%	27.8%	19.6%	–	0.1%	12.8%	1.0%
KRi	MBC	8–9 February 2021	LI(M-VN)	804	95%, ±3.5%p	28.1%	–	30.0%	–	21.9%	0.5%	18.2%	1.3%
KRi	MBC	8–9 February 2021	LI(M-VN)	804	95%, ±3.5%p	28.1%	–	31.2%	20.3%	–	0.6%	18.6%	1.1%
Realmeter	TBS, YTN	7–8 February 2021	LI 50%, ARS 50% (M-RDD 80%, L-RDD 20%)	1,016	95%, ±3.1%p	–	37.5%	22.7%	–	25.0%	3.6%	9.9%	1.4%
Realmeter	TBS, YTN	7–8 February 2021	LI 50%, ARS 50% (M-RDD 80%, L-RDD 20%)	1,016	95%, ±3.1%p	–	37.7%	26.7%	18.7%	–	4.2%	11.4%	1.3%
Hankook Research	Hankook Ilbo	4–6 February 2021	LI(M-VN)	800	95%, ±3.5%p	–	35.7%	27.0%	–	22.8%	6.8%	1.2%	6.4%
Hankook Research	Hankook Ilbo	4–6 February 2021	LI(M-VN)	800	95%, ±3.5%p	–	37.0%	29.6%	19.0%	–	6.6%	1.7%	6.1%
Hankook Research	Hankook Ilbo	4–6 February 2021	LI(M-VN)	800	95%, ±3.5%p	26.7%	–	29.6%	–	24.7%	8.2%	2.9%	5.9%
Hankook Research	Hankook Ilbo	4–6 February 2021	LI(M-VN)	800	95%, ±3.5%p	27.7%	–	34.5%	21.8%	–	7.2%	2.1%	6.7%
Jowon C&I	Sisa Journal	1–2 February 2021	ARS(M-VN)	1,000	95%, ±3.1%p	–	38.4%	21.6%	–	22.6%	4.5%	8.3%	4.6%
For more information, visit the National Election Survey Deliberation Committee

Polling method
- ARS: Automatic Response System, a robocall method similar to IVR
- LI: Live interview
- M-VN: Poll that surveyed Mobile phone users with Virtual number
- M-RDD: Poll that surveyed Mobile phone users with Random digit dialing
- L-RDD: Poll that surveyed Landline users with Random digit dialing

=== Exit poll ===
KBS/MBC/SBS exit poll
Demographic group	Park	Oh
Total vote	37.7	59.0
Age
18–29 years old	34.1	57.3
30–39 years old	38.7	56.5
40–49 years old	49.3	48.3
50–59 years old	42.4	55.8
60–69 years old	29.1	69.7
70 and older	25.2	74.2
Age by gender
18–29 years old men	22.2	72.5
18–29 years old women	44.0	40.9
30–39 years old men	32.6	63.8
30–39 years old women	43.7	50.6
40–49 years old men	51.3	45.8
40–49 years old women	47.8	50.2
50–59 years old men	45.1	52.4
50–59 years old women	40.3	58.5
60+ years old men	28.3	70.2
60+ years old women	26.4	73.3

Young voters, who have traditionally sided with the Democratic Party, voted for the conservative PPP according to the Seoul exit polls. PPP's Oh Se-hoon won by a margin of 55.3 percent to 34.1 percent among voters in their 20s, and 56.5 percent to 38.7 percent among voters in their 30s. Among male voters in their 20s, Oh received a staggering 72.5 percent support in the exit poll. This swing among young voters to the PPP was attributed to the Moon government's left-leaning real estate policies, such as tightening of borrowing rules and raising various home-related taxes, affecting young people who wish to buy a home of their own. More importantly, the Democratic Party's continued support for feminism and women-prioritized policies had caused severe social divisions between young men and women, which prompted male 20s to vote for the conservative Oh. The PPP's Lee Junseok and Ha Taekyoung's role in promoting social unity amongst males and females while giving voice to the male 20s played a critical role. The Democratic administration was perceived to be of double standards, as seen in the alleged meddling of former Justice Minister Cho Kuk and his wife in their children's school admissions, sexual harassment cases of both former Seoul and Busan mayors affiliated with the ruling party, and the Democrats' decision to field candidates against its internal rule prohibiting competing in by-elections caused by "serious wrongdoing" by its members and seen as a critical factor in the Democrats losing support from young voters.

Park Young-sun's comment that young people had a weak sense and experience of history after the release of weak poll numbers among young voters was said to have backfired on the DP. In contrast, Oh embraced the youth vote by hosting campaign events with young voters making endorsement speeches went viral online, and by promising to deliver speedy measures to increase housing supply in Seoul and also to look after the reinstatement and recovery of the victim of sexual harassment by the previous mayor Park Won-soon.

=== Results ===
2021 Seoul mayoral by-election
Party	Candidate	Votes	%	±%
People Power	Oh Se-hoon	2,798,788	57.50	+34.16
Democratic	Park Young-sun	1,907,336	39.18	–13.61
National Revolutionary	Huh Kyung-young	52,107	1.07	(new)
Women's	Kim Jin-ah	33,421	0.68	(new)
Basic Income	Shin Ji-hye	23,628	0.48	(new)
Independent	Shin Ji-ye	18,039	0.37	−1.30
Progressive	Song Myeong-suk	12,272	0.25	−0.19
Minsaeng	Lee Su-bong	11,196	0.23	(new)
Mirae	Oh Tae-yang	6,483	0.13	−0.10
Independent	Chung Dong-hui	1,874	0.03	(new)
Independent	Lee Do-yeop	1,664	0.03	(new)
New Liberal Democratic Union	Bae Yeong-gyu	634	0.01	(new)
Informal votes		35,188		
Turnout		3,523,239	58.2	TBD
Registered electors		8,425,869		+0.5

== Mayor of Busan ==
2021 Busan mayoral by-election
- 7 April 2021

Busan Metropolitan Mayor. Elected by simple majority using first past the post. Triggered by resignation of incumbent
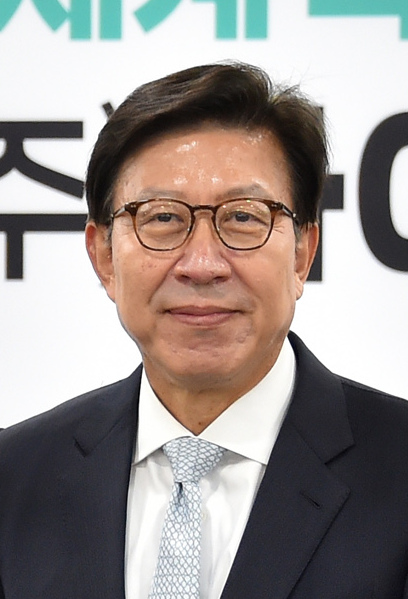

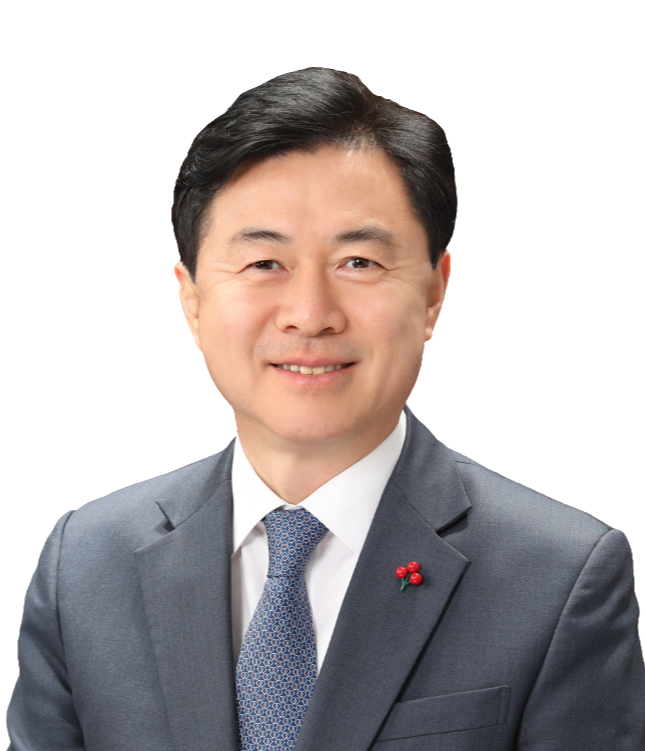
Candidate	Park Heong-joon	Kim Young-choon
Party	People Power	Democratic
Popular vote	961,576	528,135
Percentage	62.67%	34.42%
Mayor of Busan before election
Lee Byung-jin (acting)
Independent
Subsequent Mayor of Busan
Park Heong-joon
People Power

=== Primary ===
==== Democratic Party ====
On 6 March 2021, Kim Young-choon won Democratic preselection for the Busan mayorship, defeating Byeon Sung-wan and Park In-young.

===== Candidates =====
- Byeon Sung-wan, Acting Mayor of Busan
- Kim Young-choon, Former Minister of Oceans and Fisheries, Former Secretary-General of the National Assembly, Former Member of the National Assembly from Seoul Gwangjin A·Busan Busanjin A
- Park In-young, Former Speaker of the Busan Metropolitan Council
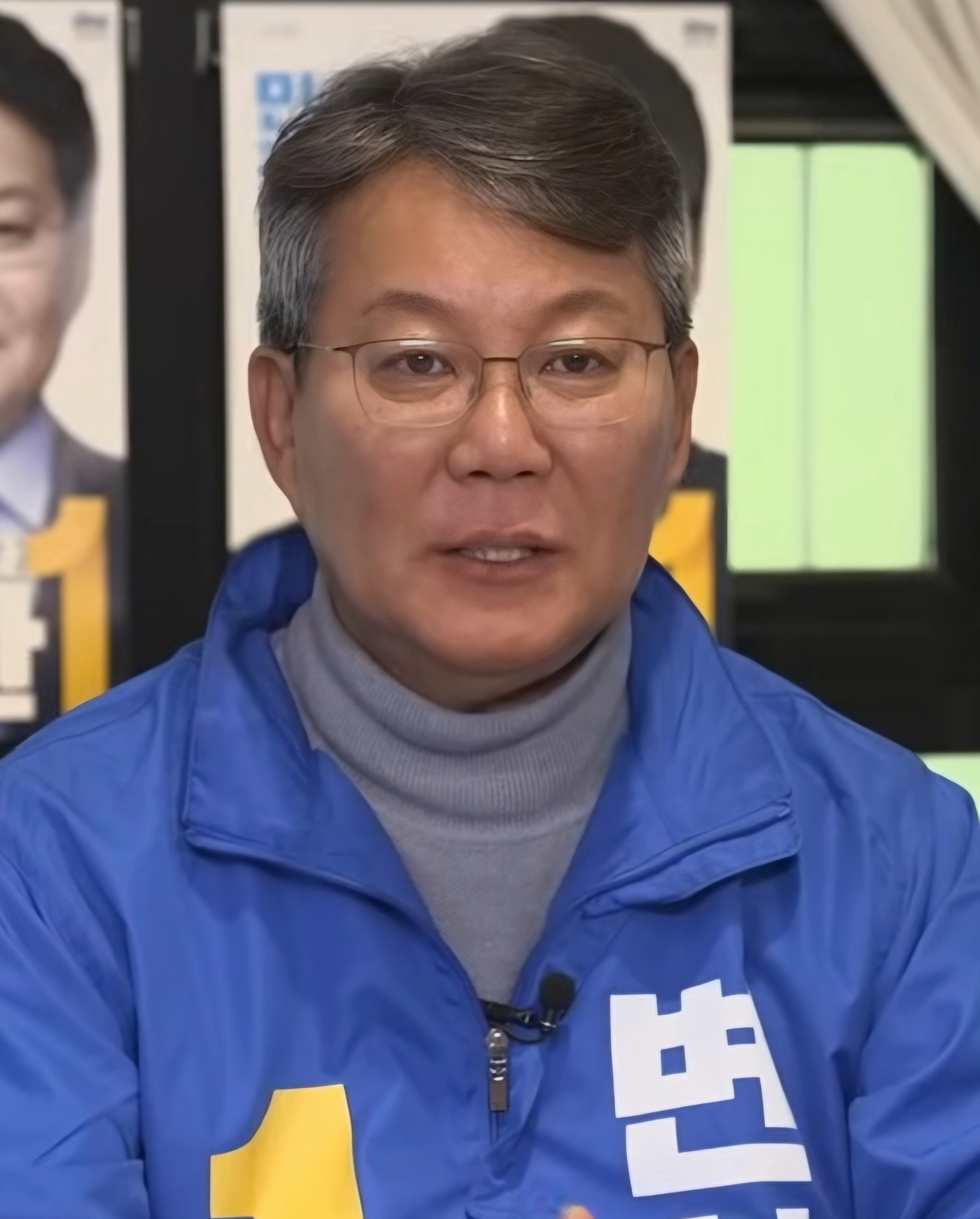
Acting Mayor of Busan
Byeon Sung-wan

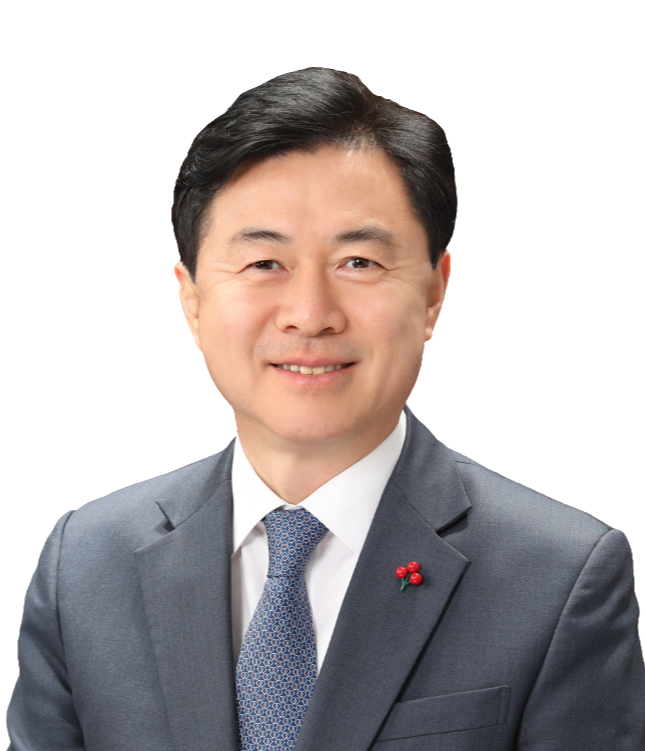
Former Minister of Oceans and Fisheries
Kim Young-choon

Former Speaker of the Busan Metropolitan Council
Park In-young

==== People Power Party ====
On 4 March 2021, Park Heong-joon won PPP preselection for the Busan mayorship, defeating Park Seong-hun and Lee Un-ju.

===== Candidates =====
- Park Min-shik, Former Member of the National Assembly from Busan Buk–Gangseo A
- Park Heong-joon, Former Professor of the Dong-a University, Former Senior Secretary to the President for Political Affairs, Former Secretary-General of the National Assembly, Former Member of the National Assembly from Busan Suyeong
- Lee Un-ju, Former Member of the National Assembly Gyeonggi Gwangmyeong B
- Park Seong-hun, Former Vice Mayor of Busan
Former Member of the National Assembly
Park Min-shik

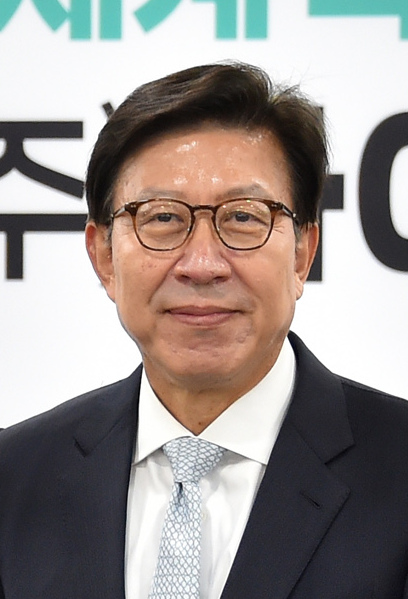
Former Professor of the Dong-a University
Park Heong-joon

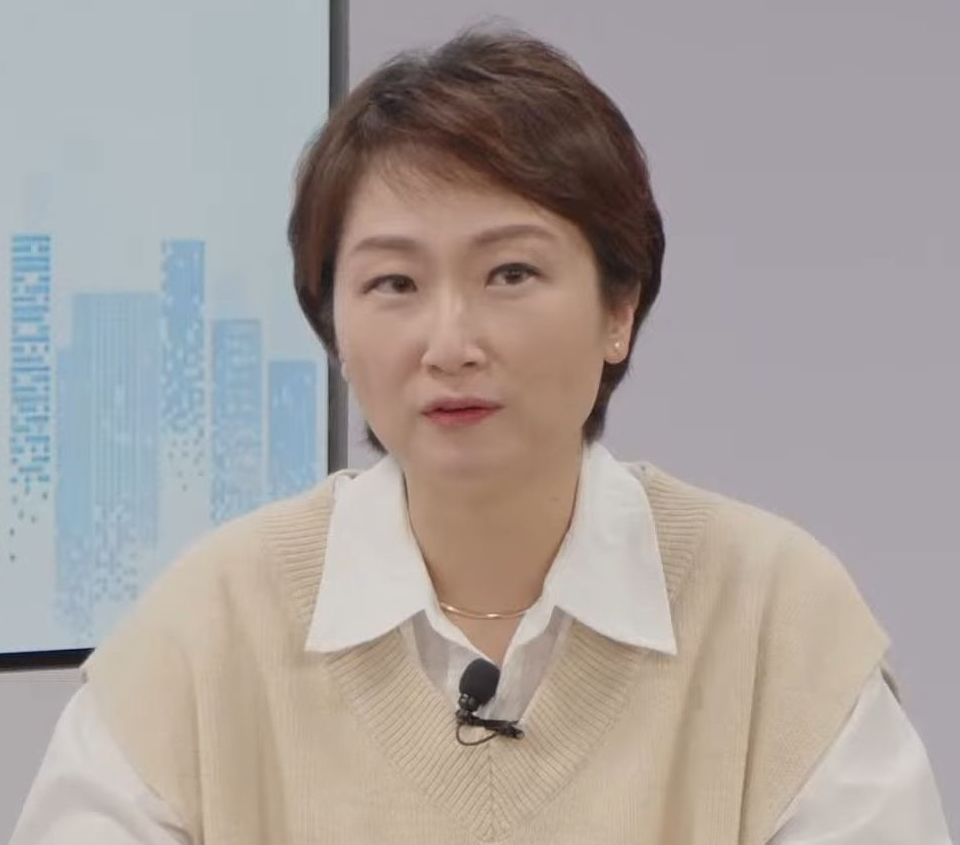
Former Member of the National Assembly
Lee Un-ju

Former Vice Mayor of Busan
Park Seong-hun

=== List of registered candidates ===
#	Name	Party	Date of birth	Career	Notes
1	Kim Young-choon	Democratic	5 February 1962 (age 64)	Former Member of the National Assembly; Former Minister of Oceans and Fisheries (2017–2019); Former Secretary-General of the National Assembly (2020)	
2	Park Heong-joon	PPP	19 January 1960 (age 66)	Former Professor at Dong-a University (1991–2021); Former Member of the National Assembly for Suyeong (2004–2008); Former Senior Secretary to the President for Political Affairs (2009–2010); Former Secretary-General of the National Assembly (2014–2016)	
6	Sohn Sang-woo	Mirae	16 December 1981 (age 44)	Head of the Mirae Party for Busan	
7	Bae Joon-hyun	Minsaeng	8 February 1973 (age 53)	Head of the Minsaeng Party for Busan	
8	Jeong Kyu-jae	FDP	12 January 1957 (age 69)	Former Chief Editor of Korea Economic Daily; Founder and former Chief of Pennmike	
9	Roh Jung-hyun	Progressive	28 January 1978 (age 48)	Former Member of the Yeonje District Council (2010–2014); Head of the Progressive Party for Busan	
Source: National Election Commission

=== Results ===
2021 Busan mayoral by-election
Party	Candidate	Votes	%	±%
People Power	Park Heong-joon	961,576	62.67	+25.51
Democratic	Kim Young-choon	528,135	34.42	−20.81
Freedom and Democracy Party (South Korea)	Chung Kyu-jae	16,380	1.06	(new)
Progressive	Roh Jeong-hyeon	13,054	0.85	(new)
Mirae	Son Sang-woo	7,933	0.51	(new)
Minsaeng	Bae Jun-hyeon	7,251	0.47	(new)
Informal votes		11,722		
Turnout		1,546,051	52.7	−6.1
Registered electors		2,936,301		−0.1

== Municipal Mayor ==
=== Mayor of Nam District, Ulsan ===
2021 Nam District mayoral by-election
Party	Candidate	Votes	%
People Power	Seo Dong-wook	69,689	63.73
Democratic	Kim Seok-gyeom	24,223	22.15
Progressive	Kim Jin-seok	15,431	14.11
Turnout		110,136	40.50
Registered electors		271,967	

=== Mayor of Uiryeong County ===
2021 Uiryeong County mayoral by-election
Party	Candidate	Votes	%
People Power	Oh Tae-wan	7,335	44.33
Democratic	Kim Chung-gyu	4,942	29.87
Independent	Oh Yong	2,158	13.04
Independent	Kim Chang-hwan	2,109	12.74
Turnout		16,997	69.51
Registered electors		24,452	

== Member of Metropolitan Council ==
=== Seoul Metropolitan Council ===
2021 Seoul Metropolitan Council by-election: Gangbuk 1st
Party	Candidate	Votes	%
People Power	Lee Jong-hwan	18,912	50.78
Democratic	Kim Seung-sik	18,325	49.21
Turnout		38,723	52.99
Registered electors		73,147	

=== Gyeonggi Metropolitan Council ===
2021 Gyeonggi Metropolitan Council by-election: Guri 1st
Party	Candidate	Votes	%
People Power	Paik Hyeon-jong	14,150	54.86
Democratic	Shin Dong-hwa	11,641	45.13
Turnout		26,002	28.34
Registered electors		91,734	

=== North Chungcheong Metropolitan Council ===
2021 North Chungcheong Metropolitan Council by-election: Boeun
Party	Candidate	Votes	%
People Power	Won Gap-hui	5,549	41.16
Independent	Park Kyeong-suk	4,923	36.52
Democratic	Kim Gi-jun	3,007	22.30
Turnout		13,591	46.53
Registered electors		29,212	

=== South Jeolla Metropolitan Council ===
2021 South Jeolla Metropolitan Council by-election: Suncheon 1st
Party	Candidate	Votes	%
Democratic	Han Chun-ok	8,055	64.79
Independent	Ju Yun-sik	4,377	35.20
Turnout		12,597	26.31
Registered electors		47,888	

2021 South Jeolla Metropolitan Council by-election: Goheung 2nd
Party	Candidate	Votes	%
Democratic	Park Seon-jun	9,045	53.34
Independent	Chung Sun-yeol	7,912	46.65
Turnout		17,141	55.71
Registered electors		30,771	

=== South Gyeongsang Metropolitan Council ===
2021 South Gyeongsang Metropolitan Council by-election: Goseong 1st
Party	Candidate	Votes	%
People Power	Paik Su-myeong	6,175	56.57
Democratic	Ryu Jeong-yeol	2,600	23.82
Independent	Lee Woo-yeong	2,140	19,60
Turnout		11,006	50.18
Registered electors		21,932	

2021 South Gyeongsang Metropolitan Council by-election: Uiryeong
Party	Candidate	Votes	%
People Power	Son Tae-yeong	10,043	61.76
Democratic	Chung Kwon-yong	6,218	38.23
Turnout		16,996	69.51
Registered electors		24,452	

2021 South Gyeongsang Metropolitan Council by-election: Hamyang
Party	Candidate	Votes	%
Independent	Kim Jae-woong	8,253	48.61
People Power	Park Hui-gyu	6,548	38.56
Democratic	Chung Jae-gak	2,176	12.81
Turnout		17,158	49.13
Registered electors		34,922	

== Member of Municipal Council ==
=== Seoul ===
2021 Yeongdeungpo Council by-election: F electoral district
Party	Candidate	Votes	%
People Power	Cha In-yeong	12,626	59.12
Democratic	Yang Songi	8,727	40.87
Turnout		22,084	60.69
Registered electors		36,390	

2021 Songpa Council by-election: D electoral district
Party	Candidate	Votes	%
People Power	Kim Sun-ae	23,313	62.96
Democratic	Bae Shin-jeong	11,115	30.01
Mirae	Choi ji-seon	2,559	7.01
Turnout		37,833	62.13
Registered electors		60,895	

=== Ulsan ===
2021 Ulju Council by-election: B electoral district
Party	Candidate	Votes	%
People Power	Park Ki-hong	14,376	61.38
Democratic	Kim Ki-rak	9,043	38.61
Turnout		23,660	32.62
Registered electors		72,521	

=== Gyeonggi ===
2021 Paju Council by-election: A electoral district
Party	Candidate	Votes	%
People Power	Park Su-yeon	11,039	49.04
Democratic	Son Seong-ik	9,268	41.17
Progressive	Kim Yeong-jung	2,200	9.77
Turnout		22,649	20.18
Registered electors		112,024	

=== South Chungcheong ===
2021 Yesan Council by-election: D electoral district
Party	Candidate	Votes	%
People Power	Hong Won-pyo	3,029	41.41
Democratic	Lee Heung-yeop	2,345	32.06
Independent	Shin Hyeon-mo	1,422	19.44
Independent	Lee Kyeong-il	307	4.19
Independent	In Hui-yeol	211	2.88
Turnout		7,368	46.28
Registered electors		15,921	

=== North Jeolla ===
2021 Gimje Council by-election: B electoral district
Party	Candidate	Votes	%
Democratic	Kim Seung-il	3,103	46.73
Independent	Kim Seong-bae	2,086	31.42
Independent	Moon Byeong-seon	957	14.41
Independent	Choi Hoon	493	7.42
Turnout		6,693	32.14
Registered electors		20,825	

=== South Jeolla ===
2021 Boseong Council by-election: C electoral district
Party	Candidate	Votes	%
Democratic	Cho Yeong-nam	2,209	45.12
Independent	Kim Mi-yeol	2,204	45.02
Independent	Yoon Jeong-jae	482	9.84
Turnout		4,962	61.44
Registered electors		8,076	

=== South Gyeongsang ===
2021 Uiryeong Council by-election: D electoral district
Party	Candidate	Votes	%
Independent	Yoon Byeong-yeol	1,826	50.19
People Power	Cha Seong-gil	1,812	49.80
Turnout		3,771	70.04
Registered electors		5,384	

2021 Haman Council by-election: C electoral district
Party	Candidate	Votes	%
People Power	Hwang Cheol-yong	5,215	74.34
Democratic	Cho Ho-gi	1,800	25.65
Turnout		7,068	41.07
Registered electors		17,209	
