= Amatzia Chen =

- אמציה חן
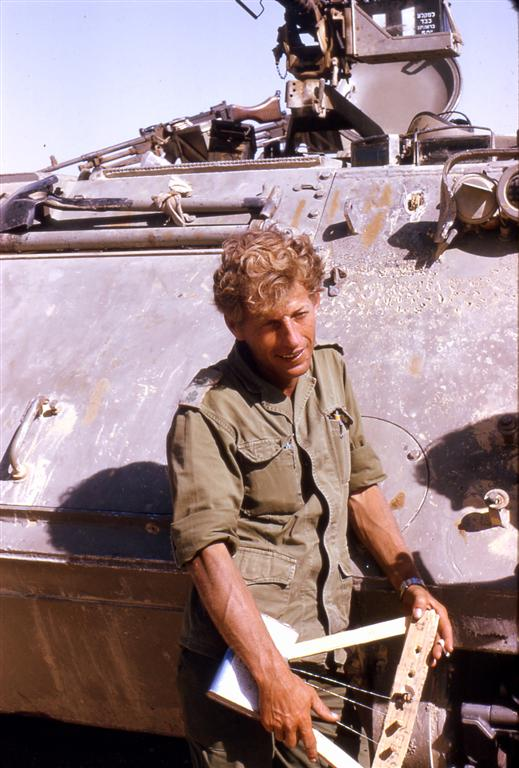
- Amatzia during the Yom Kippur War
- Born: September 12, 1940 (age 86); Hulda, Israel
- Military career
- Allegiance: Israel
- Branch: Israel Defense Forces
- Service years: 1959–1991
- Rank: Tat Aluf (Brigadier General)
- Nickname: Patzi
- Commands: Commander of the Shaked Patrol; Commander of Force Patzi; Commander of the Reserved Armored Brigade, 434th Brigade; Commander of Reserve Division 220; Commander of the National Training Center on Tze'elim
- Conflicts: Six-Day War; War of Attrition; Yom Kippur War; First Lebanon War

Amatzia "Patzi" Chen (Hebrew: אמציה חן; born 1940) is a former Israeli Tat Aluf (Brigadier General) who served as a commander in the Shaked patrol during the Six Day War and the commander of a special patrol force in Division 143 which was named after his name "Force Patzi" in the Yom Kippur War, under the command of Ariel Sharon (who later became the 11th Prime Minister of Israel).

== Biography ==
Chen was born in Kibbutz Hulda named Amatzia Haimovich to David and Sima Haimovich, who were among the people that came to reside in Hulda with a group named "Bitzur" from Romania at the end of the 30s. As a youth, he was trained in patrols around the kibbutz. In high school, he studied agronomics at a professional school in the Jordan Valley, until his enlistment in the IDF on 1959.

== Military service ==
When he enlisted in the IDF, he volunteered for the Paratroopers Brigade, where he was assigned to the Paratrooper Battalion 890. In the paratroopers Amatzia underwent a training course as a combatant and took part in training and operational activities in the battalion and brigade, later becoming a squad commander. While being in officers course he met a cadet from the Shaked patrol and requested joining them. At the end of the course, he was appointed commander of the platoon in the Shaked brigade until his service ended in 1962. Then he worked in a family business in Beer Sheva, and marketed wholesale of vegetables in Haifa.

=== Six Day War ===
In Six Day War he participated in the occupation of the outpost Kuntillet as an officer in Shaked patrol. Following the war, he enlisted in the IDF, and served in Shaked patrol under the command of Binyamin Ben-Eliezer and Danny (Volf) Rahav. During this period he participated in raidings across enemy lines in Egypt, Jordan and Syria.

=== Yom Kippur War ===
In 1971, the Shaked Patrol was sent to the Gaza Strip, where it was responsible for combatting terrorism. In that time Amatzia was the deputy commander of the patrol, and when Danny Rahav was forced to withdraw from patrol (because of illness), Amatzia commanded the patrol. In 1973 he went to study at the Interdepartmental College for Command and Staff and when the Yom Kippur War broke out, he was ordered to command a special patrol force in Division 143 under the command of Ariel Sharon (who later became the prime minister of Israel), which was named in his name "Force Patzi", and was referred "Roman" in the communication network. Under his command, he and his force fought in the Suez Canal, carried out reconnaissance missions and military operations to obtain combat intelligence, and also pursued Egyptian commandos and artillery officers.

=== After the War ===
After the war, Amatzia became a member of Armored Corps. From 1976 to 1979 he was the commander of the Reserved Armored Brigade, 434th Brigade (also named "The Steel Tracks"). Later he commanded the Reserve Division 220 and then the training base at Tze'elim. In the 80s he studied and taught at the National Security College.

== Later life ==
Amatzia graduated from the IDF with the rank of Tat Aluf (Brigadier General) in 1991, and since then he has been working as a road and infrastructure contractor. Amatzia publishes articles on military matters in various journals, with the aim of motivating a change in the IDF. He lives in Karmei Yosef.

== Bibliography ==
- Preparations for the War, Ma'arachot, No. 359, January 1998, Pages 30–39
- Battle Legacy from a Personal Perspective, Ma'arachot, Issue 403–404, 🔨 December 2005, Pages 22–35
- Amatzia Chen, News First Class, Yok Kippur War – then and now, October 19, 2005.
- Amatzia Chen, News First Class, Goals of operation Protective Edge, July 13, 2014.
- Amatzia Chen, Israel Hayom, Appoint Amir Eshel as the next Chief of Staff, June 23, 2018.
