= Aju Business Daily =

South Korean daily newspaper

- Type: Daily newspaper
- Format: Broadsheet
- Owner: Aju Media Group (아주미디어그룹)
- Founder: Kwak Young-kil
- Founded: 26 February 2003

Aju News Corporation (Korean: 아주경제; Hanja: 亞洲經濟; also known as Aju Business Daily) is an economic newspaper launched in October 2007 by former Korea Economic Daily and Seoul Economic Daily reporter Kwak Young-gil, and published in South Korea. Based in Seoul, it is a major newspaper in South Korea.

== History ==
Aju Business Daily was founded in October 2007. In October 2010, it began to cooperate with Hong Kong–based Wen Wei Po to provide news about the Chinese economy.
