= Kim Eui-kyung =

South Korean writer

- 김의경
- Born: December 2, 1978 (age 47); South Korea
- Occupation: Writer
- Years active: 2014–present

Kim Eui-kyung (Korean: 김의경; born December 2, 1978) is a South Korean writer. She made her literary debut in 2014 with the novel Cheongchun pasan (청춘 파산; Youth Bankruptcy). Her 2018 autobiographical novel, Kolsenteo (콜센터; Call Center), won the Surim Literary Award.

== Life ==
Kim Eui-kyung was born in South Korea in 1978. During college, she majored in Korean literature and began officially writing novels. She then spent ten years honing her craft by practicing writing all the while working dozens of part-time jobs. After entering literary award contests for new authors 14 times, she finally won in 2014 with Cheongchun pasan and became known as a writer. Stating that she did not find part-time work difficult because it allowed her to do the writing she loved, even after she heard that Cheongchun pasan won a prize, she continued working her part-time jobs. Perhaps for this reason, her works tend to only display an autobiographical aspect. Her other works include the 2018 story collection, Syorum (쇼룸 Showroom), and her second novel Kolsenteo. Kim stated that she wanted to write words that reflect “my own stories that unfold in this place where we currently live.”

== Writing ==
Kim Eui-kyung’s first novel, Cheongchun pasan, was originally submitted to her publisher under the title of Peuribaiteo (프리바이터 Free Part-Timer), but was afterwards changed to the currently known title and published. In line with its original title, which referred to people that make their livelihood through part-time jobs, Cheongchun pasan focuses on characters such as a delinquent borrower in their 20s and a woman in her 30s that declared individual bankruptcy, and thus meticulously reveals the lives of contemporary youth in great detail. In reality, the author herself, like the characters in her works, came from a family that declared household bankruptcy when she was 17 and had to move numerous times while eking out a living through various part-time jobs.

Her first short story collection, Syorum, like Cheongchun pasan, is also based on her personal experiences. Syorum was born from her experiences living in semi-basement rooms for over ten years, all the while dreaming of home ownership and visiting IKEA. The characters in Syorum —such as a female college student that lives in a one-room apartment while looking for employment, a bankrupt couple, an adulterous man in his 40s—are all based on real people that the author observed in IKEA. All the characters in Syorum are satisfied with buying furniture from IKEA rather than expensive, high-priced furniture. Within that decision is the hidden, fundamental desire known as "happiness." The author explained the reasoning behind her work as, "I thought about why people gathered at IKEA, why they were compelled to decorate their homes" and that "in the end, I realized it was because they yearned for happiness."

Kolsenteo examines five young people who manage calls from people ordering pizza and delicately draws daily life as spent in a call center. The novel was born out of the author's personal experience working at a call center for six months and has received favorable reviews from critics for pleasantly and vividly capturing the current generation and the so-called "gapjil [arrogant abuses of power by those who have positions of power over others] society."

== Works ==
=== Short story collection ===
- 《쇼룸》, 민음사, 2018 / Syorum (Showroom), Minumsa, 2018 ISBN 9788937438998

=== Novels ===
- 《청춘 파산》, 민음사, 2014 / Cheongchun pasan (Youth Bankruptcy), Minumsa, 2014 ISBN 9788937488962
- 《콜센터》, 광화문글방, 2018 / Kolsenteo (Call Center), Gwanghwamun geulbang, 2018 ISBN 9788974331290

== Awards ==
- Korea Economic Daily New Writer's Contest, 2014
- Surim Literary Award, 2019)
