= Ballie =

Robot created by Samsung

Ballie is an AI robot created by Samsung to be released in 2026. It is an autonomous robot which has the ability to control smart home devices. Ballie can text, send pictures and follow commands through SmartThings. It can also show workout information shared from a Galaxy Watch. Ballie can make video calls and welcome you home.

== Design ==
Ballie has a bright yellow spherical body with a single rectangular slit on its front. The original version shown in 2020 was about the size of a tennis ball and was equipped with a camera, microphone and speaker. The version presented at CES 2024 is considerably larger, roughly the size of a bowling ball, with a battery rated for two to three hours of use. It navigates with a spatial lidar sensor and includes a 1080p projector with two lenses. Samsung stated that the projector could adjust its image to the distance and lighting of the surface and change its angle based on a viewer's posture and face direction. Ballie also carries a time-of-flight camera sensor alongside its lidar; because it moves on wheels, it cannot climb stairs and operates on a single floor. An infrared transmitter allows it to operate appliances that are not connected to the internet.

An analysis of Samsung's patent filings by the patent research firm Parola Analytics identified several applications related to Ballie's design. These include a U.S. design patent for a round, two-wheeled pet-companion robot whose appearance is nearly identical to Ballie; an application describing a spherical robot with two drive wheels that uses time-of-flight and tilt sensors to track its position on uneven surfaces; and an application for a projector-equipped robot that changes the direction of its projection in response to a user's gaze, gestures or voice commands.

== Development History ==
Ballie was unveiled by Samsung consumer electronics CEO H. S. Kim during the company's opening keynote at CES 2020, where it followed him around the stage and rolled to him when called. The name had appeared in Samsung trademark filings the previous month. At the time, Samsung gave no price, release date or specifications, and the robot was treated as a concept. Ballie followed Samsung's earlier "Samsung Bot" concepts introduced at CES 2019, including robots for elder care and air purification.

Samsung reintroduced a redesigned Ballie in a video at CES 2024, and at CES 2025 announced that it would ship in the first half of that year. In April 2025, Samsung and Google Cloud announced a partnership to integrate Google's Gemini models into Ballie, with a release planned for summer 2025 in the United States and South Korea.

== Features and Capabilities ==
In its 2020 presentation, Samsung described Ballie as a "life companion" that would learn its owners' routines, act as a fitness assistant, and patrol the home as a security device. A demonstration video showed it interacting with a family dog and directing a robotic vacuum cleaner to clean up after the pet.

The 2024 version was shown projecting films, video calls and a computer display onto nearby surfaces, and could be controlled by voice or text message. It could send users video clips of pets left at home and switch connected lights and appliances on or off. Ballie was designed to work with Samsung's SmartThings platform. Under the 2025 partnership, Ballie was to combine Gemini's multimodal reasoning with Samsung's own language models, allowing it to interpret speech, images and environmental data. Samsung said this would enable proactive home assistance and personalized advice, such as suggestions about clothing.

== Privacy and Data ==
At Ballie's 2020 introduction, Samsung executive vice president Sebastian Seung said the robot's on-device AI was intended to give users control over their information and protect their privacy. In the same keynote, Kim said Samsung would not share user data with third parties without consent and that its Samsung Knox security platform would expand to home appliances. Commentators noted privacy questions raised by a mobile, camera-equipped robot. CNN placed Ballie within a broader trend of technology companies adding cameras to household devices, and TechRadar described a robot that recognizes household members with its camera as potentially unsettling. After shelving the consumer launch, Samsung said Ballie continued to inform its work on "privacy-by-design" and ambient AI.

== Release Delays ==
The summer 2025 release did not take place. In December 2025, Samsung told TechRadar that it was still refining the technology to improve the customer experience. Ballie did not appear at CES 2026, and Bloomberg reported that the project had been indefinitely shelved; Samsung described it as an "active innovation platform" rather than a consumer product. Samsung's U.S. sign-up page for Ballie remained online until early January 2026 and was later redirected to the company's projector listings. No retail price was ever announced.

Samsung has continued working with Google on multimodal AI; according to the Seoul Economic Daily, Gemini was added to a Samsung AI glasses product in 2026, following its integration into Ballie.
