= Hankook Ilbo Media Group =

Defunct Korean publishing firm

- Industry: Media
- Founded: 1954
- Founder: Chang Key-young
- Headquarters: Seoul, South Korea

The Hankook Ilbo Media Group was a South Korean publishing company founded in 1954 by Chang Key-young and headquartered in Seoul. It had been the publisher of Hankook Ilbo, The Korea Times, Seoul Economic Daily, Sports Hankook, Children's Hankook Ilbo, Weekly Hankook and The Korea Times in North America. Hankook Ilbo also published Korean editions of Fortune Korea, Popular Science, Golf Magazine and is Bloomberg TV's content partner. Chang Jae-ku, former chairman of the Hankook Ilbo Media Group, was found guilty in February 2014 by the Seoul Central District Court of embezzling company funds worth a total of 45.6 billion won ($40.8 million) from Hankook Ilbo and Seoul Economic Daily. He was sentenced to three years in prison.

== See also ==
- List of companies of South Korea
- Communications in South Korea
