= Kim Jinai =

South Korean politician

- 김진애
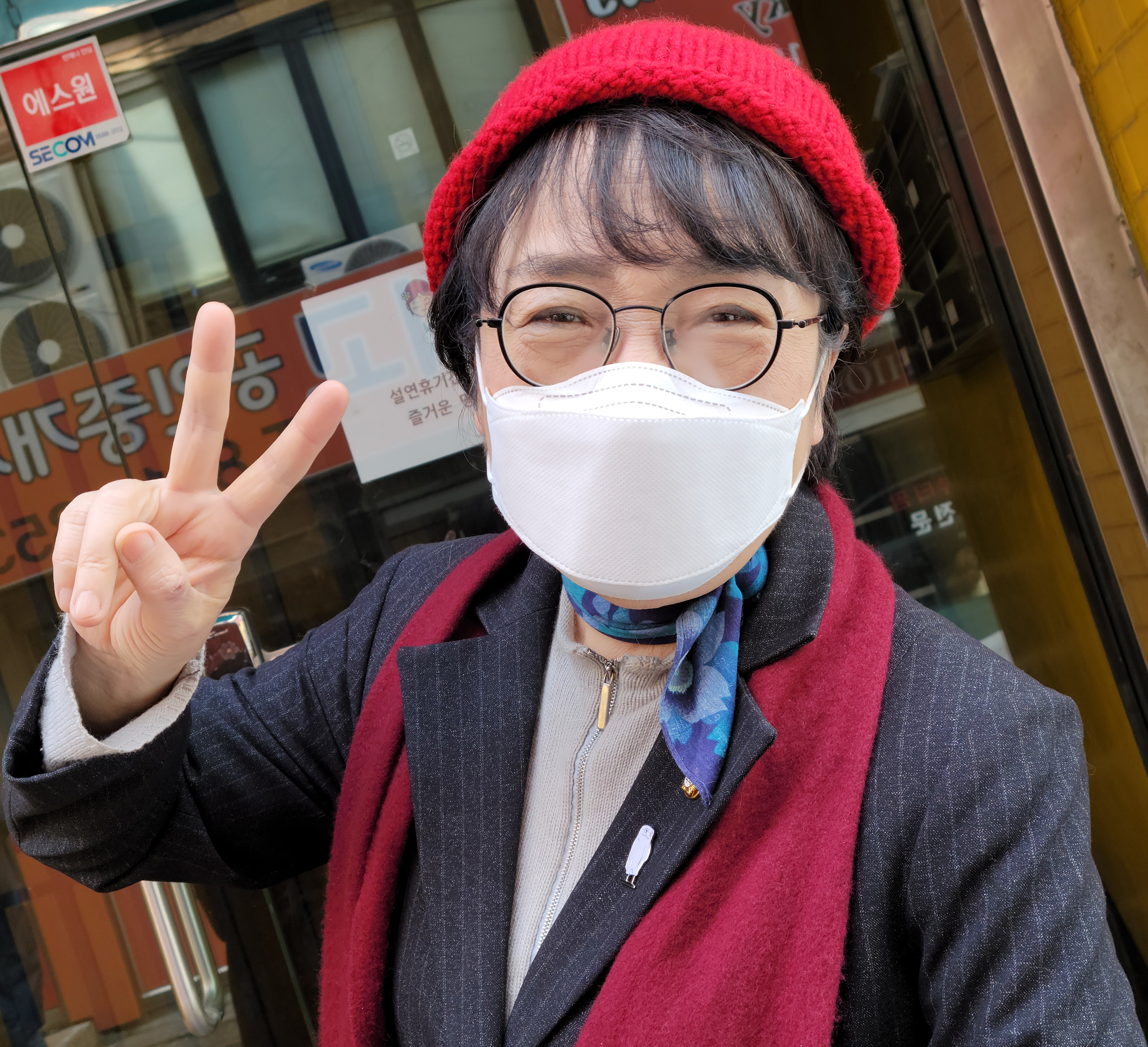

Floor leader of Open Democratic Party
- In office 30 May 2020 – 8 March 2021
- Preceded by: position created

Member of the National Assembly
- In office 30 May 2020 – 23 March 2021
- Constituency: Proportional representation
- In office November 2009 – 29 May 2012
- Constituency: Proportional representation

Personal details
- Born: 19 February 1953 (age 73) Siheung, South Korea
- Party: Democratic
- Education: Seoul National University; MIT

Kim Jinai (Korean: 김진애; Hanja: 金鎭愛; born 16 February 1953), also known as Kim Jin-ae, is a South Korean urban engineer and politician.

== Biography ==
In 1971 Kim was the only woman admitted to study at Seoul National University College of Engineering which building then only had men's bathrooms.

Upon return from studying at Massachusetts Institute of Technology, Kim took several notable urban planning projects such as creating Sanbon Newtown, one of satellite cities of Seoul, and restructuring Insa-dong. She took numerous policy advisory roles to the government of both conservative and liberal presidents and major construction projects like Sejong City.

For the 2008 general election, Kim was placed as number 17 of the proportional list for preceding party of now Democratic Party of Korea but failed to be elected. However, after one of the members elected via proportional list resigned, she finally became a lawmaker in November 2009. Highlighting the problems of "Four Major River project" of Lee Myung-bak administration is her best known work as a parliamentarian to the public.

For the 2012 general election, Kim applied to earn Democratic Party's nomination for Seoul Mapo A constituency but lost to Noh Woong-rae.

For the 2020 general election, Kim was placed as the top of the list of newly created party's proportional representation list. Kim assumed the floor leadership as she is the only lawmaker of her party who has served more than once. In December 2020, Kim announced her candidacy for Seoul Mayor in the upcoming by-election in April 2021. On 8 March 2021 Kim submitted her resignation as a member of the National Assembly to focus on her campaign as mayor of the capital of the country. After their agreed poll found Park Young-sun of Democratic Party more fit for office, Kim and her party endorsed Park for the post. Following Kim's resignation, a former spokesperson of President Moon Jae-in, Kim Eui-kyeom will succeed her seat at the parliament on 24 March 2021.

Kim was previously a visiting professor of architecture at Ewha Womans University and an adjunct professor at KAIST.

Kim holds three degrees in architecture - a bachelor's degree from Seoul National University, a master's from Massachusetts Institute of Technology and a doctorate in urban planning from MIT. She graduated from Ewha Girls' High School.

== Electoral history ==
Election	Year	District	Party affiliation	Votes	Percentage of votes	Results
17th National Assembly General Election	2004	Seoul Yongsan	Uri Party	43,915	39.62%	Lost (2nd)
18th National Assembly General Election	2008	Proportional representation (17th)	United Democratic Party	4,313,645	25.17%	Not Elected→Elected
21st National Assembly General Election	2020	Proportional representation (1st)	Open Democratic Party	1,512,763	5.42%	Elected

== Awards ==
- Order of Civil Merit by the government of South Korea (1998)
- Time's Global 100 Roster of Young Leaders for the New Millennium (1994)
