= Huh Kyung-young =

South Korean singer and politician (born 1947)

- 허경영
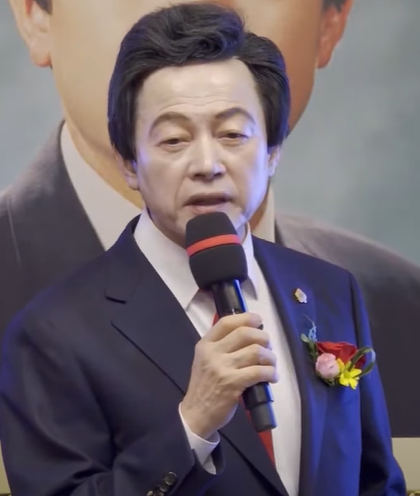
- Huh Kyung-young during one of his lectures in 2021

Founder of the National Revolutionary Dividends Party
- Incumbent
- Assumed office 15 August 2019

Personal details
- Born: 1 January 1950 (age 76) Jong-ro, Seoul, South Korea
- Party: National Revolutionary Dividends Party (2019–present)
- Other political affiliations: New People's Party (1987); Truth Peace Party (1992); Democratic Republican Party (1997–2008)

Korean name
- Hangul: 허경영
- RR: Heo Gyeongyeong
- MR: Hŏ Kyŏngyŏng

Huh Kyung-young (Korean: 허경영; born July 13, 1947) is a South Korean politician, founder of the National Revolutionary Party, cult leader, and singer.

== Early life ==
On his official profile, Huh says he was born on January 1, 1950 near Jungnanggyo, Seoul, South Korea. His father, Huh Nam-gwon (허남권), made his own fortunes, but was executed in 1950 for charges of being a communist. He lost both of his parents at the age of four.

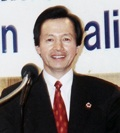
Huh Kyung Young at the asian american coalition.

== Political career ==
Huh has participated in the 1987 South Korean presidential election as a member of the New People's Party (not to be confused with the New Democratic Party), and in the 1992 South Korean presidential elections as a presidential candidate for the Truth Peace Party, and in the 1997 South Korean presidential elections as a candidate for the self-made Democratic Republican Party, promising the revival of the Joseon dynasty and the merger of Gyeonggi Province with Seoul.

Huh ran in the 2007 South Korean presidential election, again under the Democratic Republican Party (briefly rebranded to the Economic Republican Party). After the election, Huh was banned from politics for 10 years for making false claims about election opponents, mainly Park Geun-hye, saying that he was conditionally engaged to the then-leader of the biggest conservative party and threatened to marry her after the results of the conservative party's primary. Other misinformation Huh spread during the campaign included claims that he attended George W. Bush's inauguration banquet on behalf of South Korea and he is an adopted son of late Samsung Group founder Lee Byung-chul.

Huh founded his own party, the National Revolutionary Party, in August 2019. He was a candidate for the 2022 South Korean presidential election, but lost by wide margins to People Power Party's presidential candidate Yoon Suk-yeol.

Huh was once again found guilty of violating South Korean election law on 9 June 2024. Huh was found guilty by the Supreme Court and will not be able to run in elections until 2034. He was also indicted on charges of violating the Public Official Election Act, with two years in prison and three years of probation. Huh claimed on a nationally televised debate during the 2022 Presidential Election that he was the adopted son of the late Samsung Group Chairman Lee Byung-chul and was an unelected policy aide to former President Park Chung Hee.

== Public image ==
A perennial candidate, Huh is known for his antics and unrealistic campaign promises and is considered somewhat of a joke politician. Huh has claimed that he possessed the ability to levitate, has an IQ of 430, and is capable of performing chukjibeop.

== Discography ==
On August 15, 2009, the Liberation Day of Korea, he released his first digital single "Call Me", which borrows its hook from the Inspector Gadget theme song. In the song, Huh repeats the phrase "look into my eyes and you will become healthier. Look into my eyes and you will be [more attractive]."

== Bibliography ==
- The hibiscus flower has not fallen (2000)

== Religion related business activities ==
Huh Kyung-young conducts religious activities in a complex called "Heaven Palace" (Korean: 하늘궁), located in Jangheung-myeon, Yangju, Gyeonggi Province. Expanded in November 2017, Huh claims that Heaven Palace is a beautiful spot destined to become a world-famous landmark. Notably, Huh's residence is also located within this complex.

Originally, Heaven Palace began as a fan club for Huh Kyung-young. However, after Huh was arrested in 2007 for violations of the Public Official Election Act (specifically, the crime of publishing false information) and defamation by specifying false facts, he was sentenced to one year and six months in prison and was released in 2009. Following his release, Huh started to make deification claims about himself during lectures, which led to a gathering of followers and effectively transformed the fan club into a religious organization.

Heaven Palace is registered as a corporation named "Chojongkyo Heaven Palace Co., Ltd." As of 2021, the company reported sales of 8.3 billion KRW with an astonishing operating profit margin of 96.5%. This means that nearly all its revenue translates directly into pure profit. To put this into perspective, most major companies, including Samsung Electronics, barely exceed an operating profit margin of 10%.

According to the public disclosure of assets for the 22nd National Assembly elections in 2024, Huh Kyung-young's wealth increased to 48.1 billion KRW, a rise of 40 billion KRW since 2021. This suggests that Heaven Palace's revenue has likely continued to grow since 2021. Heaven Palace also sells various merchandise featuring images of the complex through Huh Kyung-young's official online store. Despite the high prices, the design quality of these goods is relatively low, reflecting the organization's high operating profit margin of 96.5%.

Heaven Palace and its spiritual center, in connection with allegations against Huh Kyung-young and his associates, including charges of fraud under the Act on Aggravated Punishment for Specific Economic Crimes, violations of the Political Funds Act, and violations of the Food Sanitation Act. Some Heaven Palace followers filed a lawsuit against Huh Kyung-young, claiming they were sold spiritual products at exorbitant prices compared to the cost, with the alleged total damages amounting to tens of billions of won. This was the second search and seizure of Heaven Palace. In April 2024, the police previously searched Heaven Palace in connection with allegations of Huh Kyung-young's sexual harassment of followers. Huh Kyung-young underwent police questioning three times until July 2024.

There has been controversy over the marketing and sale of commercially available milk falsely advertised as "elixir milk" and spring water from a mineral fountain claimed to cure incurable diseases, promoted as "miraculous elixir water." On 26 November 2023, an 80-year old man was found dead at Heaven Palace after drinking the "elixir milk" a few days prior. This milk, named "bullyu," translated literally as, "eternal youth," by Huh, is kept unrefrigerated in a glass armiore on the second floor of the International Visitor's Centre. Some bottles of milk are up to two years old or older. Huh claims that followers whisper his name to the bottles of milk and that they never expire.

Upon investigation of the death of the 80 year-old man, Yangju City coroner determined that the man had died of natural causes, and not food poisoning from ingesting expired milk.

== Electoral history ==
Year	Election	Constituency	Political party	Votes (%)	Remarks
1991	En-Pyeong Council	Eun-Pyeong 1	Independent	1.565 (21.1%)	Defeated
1991	Seoul City Council	Eun-Pyeong 1	Minjung	2,451 (8.5%)	Defeated
1997	Presidential	Country-wide	Democratic Republican	39,055 (0.15%)	Defeated
2004	Legislative	Proportional Representative	Democratic Republican	24,360 (0.11%)	Not Elected
2007	Presidential	Country-wide	Democratic Republican	96,756 (0.4%)	Defeated
10 year ban on politics (Note: Banned from politics for 10 years after making false statements about opposing candidates and spreading false information.)
2020	Legislative	Proportional Representative	National Revolutionary Dividends Party	200,657 (0.71%)	Not Elected
2021	Mayoral	Seoul	National Revolutionary Party	52,107 (1.07%)	Defeated
2022	Presidential	Country-wide	National Revolutionary Party	281,481 (0.83)	Defeated
10 year ban on politics
