= Women's Party (South Korea) =

Political party in South Korea

Women's Party 여성의당
- Collective leadership: Lee Ji-won; Chang Ji-yoo
- Founded: 8 March 2020
- Ideology: Feminism (South Korean); Trans-exclusionary radical feminism
- Political position: Big tent
- Colours: Purple
- National Assembly: 0 / 300

Party flag
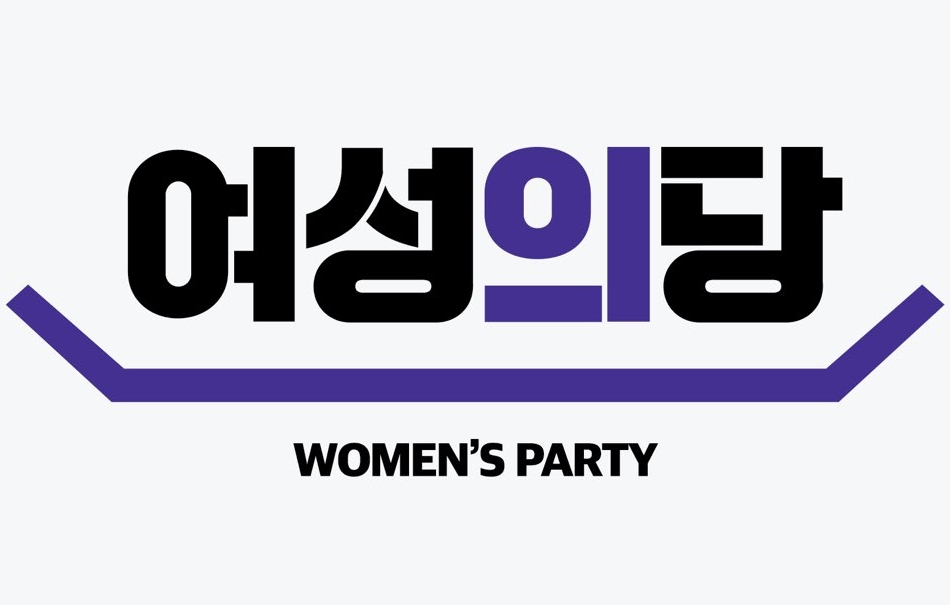

Website
- https://www.womensparty.kr

The Women's Party (Korean: 여성의당; Hanja: 女性議黨; RR: Yeoseonguidang; lit. 'Women agenda party') is a South Korean single-issue political party founded on International Women's Day 2020 that advocates for feminism.

The party calls for greater representation of women and equality in politics and an end to all forms of violence, discrimination and inequality against women in the workplace. It also holds trans exclusionary beliefs.

== History ==
=== The conflict between Feminism Party ===
The annexation between Feminism Party (페미니즘당) which is intersectional feminism and Women's Party which is trans-exclusive radical feminism were foundered because of its characters. A column wrote on Women's Human Rights Institute of Korea (Korean) which criticized gender-exclusive feminism was the reason of the conflict.

=== Establishment ===
The Women's Party was officially established on March 8, 2020, on International Women's Day. The new electoral system which expanded the opportunities for minority parties, prompted the movement to establish a Women's party spearheaded by active young and senior feminists. In 10 days, the organizers were able to qualify the group to register as an official political party. They gathered support in five municipal and provincial level parties (Gyeonggi, South Gyeongsang, Busan, Seoul, Incheon) in addition to in total 8,200 members nationwide. On the Inauguration day, Kim Eun-joo, Yoon Seo-yeon, Lee Ji-won, Won So-yoo, Chang Ji-yoo, Kim Jin-ah, and Lee Seong Suk were selected as the first joint representatives to represent the diverse age brackets of their female constituents.

=== 2020 South Korean general elections ===
The Women's Party's 10 major pledges addressed issues such as closing the gender pay gap, women's housing rights, reducing the burden of childcare, right to health etc., and prioritized curbing digital sexual crimes.

The party nominated four candidates for proportional representation: Lee Ji Won (First and second party representative), Lee Gyeong Ok (Chairperson of the South Gyeongsang Provincial Party), Park Bo Ram, Kim Ju Hee.

With 208,697 (0.74%) votes during its first election, the party came in 10th among parties who won seats in proportional representation.

During the 2020 election, online supporters of the Women's Party targeted Green Party candidate Kim Ki-hong with an online hate campaign. Party members began cyberbullying Kim, who was Korea's first transgender candidate for Parliament, calling her "an uncle in a skirt" and other transphobic remarks. Kim resigned from the election on 11 April, four days before the election, and died by suicide on 24 February 2021. In the suicide note, Kim noted the constant online harassment during the 2020 South Korean legislative election as the main reason for her worsening mental health.

=== Party convention 2020 ===
Following the general elections, the Women's Party held a virtual party convention on September 5 amid COVID-19. Lee Ji-won, Chang Ji-yoo, and Kim Jin-ah were newly elected as the second representatives.

=== Seoul mayoral by-election 2021 ===
Seoul mayor Park Won-soon died by suicide July 9, 2020, the day after his former secretary filed a complaint to the police alleging that Park had sexually harassed her.

Two candidates, Kim Jin-ah and Lee Ji-won, former and current co-representatives, ran in the party's primary, and Kim Jin-ah was elected. Candidate Kim Jin-ah emphasized that "the election was caused by the sexual misconduct case of the late former Seoul Mayor Park Won-soon," and pledged a 50% quota of female executives at public institutions under the slogan "Seoul where women are good to live alone."

=== Dissolution crisis ===
The Women's Party did not run any candidates for the 2022 local elections or the 2022 presidential election. On 5 September 2022, The Women's Party announced on the party's website that a vote for the dissolution of the party would be held. The Women's Party has been experiencing difficulties in running the party for over a year as many members left and key positions in the Party went unfilled. There were no Party members that applied to run in local elections for the 2022 election cycle. The election of the third steering committee was also canceled in July 2022 due to no applicants.

In December 2021, internal strife grew when it was revealed that Party leader Jang Ji-yu was handling the party affairs via 'Tarot card fortune-telling' and using her job as a fortune teller to influence the choices of party members in key party elections.

On 1 October 2022, the Women's Party announced that the vote to dissolve the Party passed consensus by Party members. However, according to Korean law, a vote must obtain 50% of registered voter participation in order to be considered valid. Even though the vote to dissolve the Party resulted in a majority "yes" vote, the Women's Party did not reach the 50% participation threshold of party members, and thus the vote was invalidated.

== Political position ==
Unlike mainstream feminist political parties that range from center-left to left-wing political positions, the Women's Party is big tent with members ranging from conservatives to progressives. The Women's Party focuses on broadening female representation, actualizing gender equality in politics, and fighting against inequality women experience at different stages of their lives. In order to accomplish the party's agenda, the Women's Party actively collaborates with various other political parties such as the Democratic Party of Korea, Justice Party, Basic Income Party, Green Party Korea and organizations such as Safe Abortion On Korea (모두를위한낙태죄폐지공동행동), Resolve Child Support Problem Union (양육비해결총연합회), and Bad Fathers (배드파더스).

The Women's Party has also been publicly criticized after its 2021 Seoul Mayor Candidate, Kim Jin-Ah, made comments during a televised debate that is seen as downplaying homophobia towards gay men, saying "women suffer more than homosexuals" and that "a homosexual man is still a man," and "gay [men] earn 16% more wage than women."

The Women's Party is member of Women's Declaration International which advocates for radical feminist ideologies. The Women's Party holds that transgender women are not women and rejects the notion of gender identity-based rights, a position that has been criticised as transphobic.

== Election results ==
=== General elections ===
Election	Total seats won	Total votes	Share of votes	Outcome of election	Status	Election leader
2020	0 / 300	208,697	0.74%	0 seats	Extra-Parliamentary	
2024	0 / 300	28,942	0.10%	0 seats	Extra-Parliamentary	

=== Local elections ===
Election	Candidate	Votes	%
2021 Seoul mayoral by-election	Kim Jin-ah	33,421	0.68
2026 Seoul mayoral election	Yoo Ji-hye	43,967	0.84

== See also ==
- Political parties in South Korea
- Feminism in South Korea
- Women in South Korea
