= Seoul Economic Daily =

South Korean newspaper

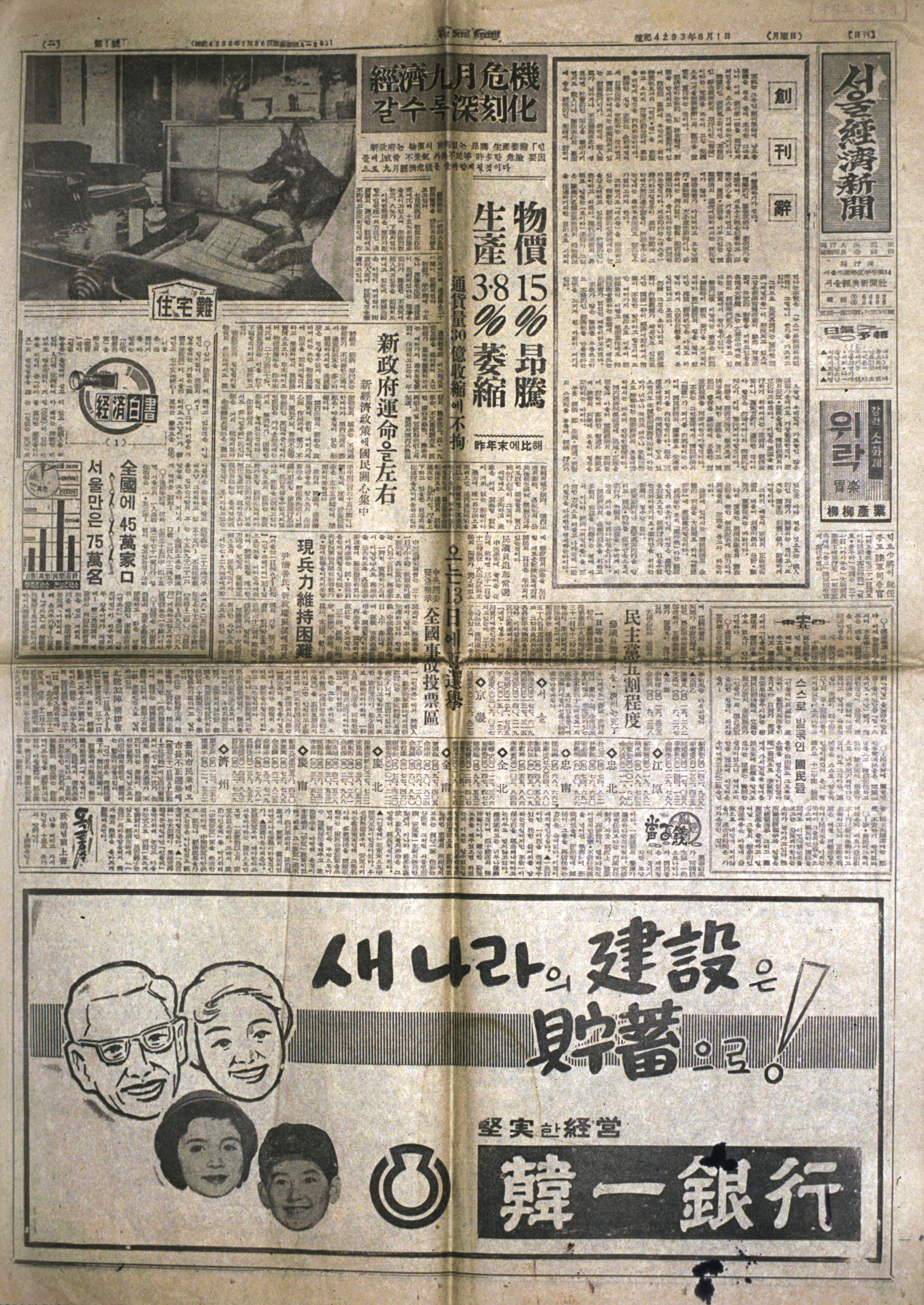
- The first issue of Seoul Economic Daily (1960)
- Type: Daily newspaper
- Language: Korean, English
- Website: www.sedaily.com

Korean name
- Hangul: 서울경제
- Hanja: 서울經濟
- RR: Seoul gyeongje
- MR: Sŏul kyŏngje

Seoul Economic Daily (Korean: 서울경제) is a South Korean newspaper covering business, finance, and economic policy. It was founded in 1960.

== History ==
The paper was founded on 1 August 1960, as a sister paper of Hankook Ilbo. It was forced to cease publication in November 1980 under the media-consolidation policy of the Chun Doo-hwan government, its final issue appearing on 25 November 1980; the closure became the subject of a long-running compensation dispute. In the resulting constitutional case, the Constitutional Court of Korea recorded the owning company's account that a family member was made to sign a document renouncing the paper under intimidation before its closure; the company sued the state for damages in 1991, and on 20 February 1997 the court held that the relevant limitation provision of the State Compensation Act was not unconstitutional, which left the closure without state compensation.

The paper resumed publication on 1 August 1988, and its publishing company was established as an independent corporation on 11 February 1989; on 1 October 2000 it fully separated from the Hankook Ilbo.

On 10 October 2008, it diversified into television by establishing a television channel called Seoul Economic Network TV.

Its ownership was reshaped during the financial difficulties of the wider Hankook Ilbo Media Group in the mid-2010s. In 2013 the group's chairman, Chang Jae-ku, was convicted of embezzlement and breach of trust in a case prosecutors said had affected both the Hankook Ilbo and Seoul Economic Daily; his sentence was reduced on appeal in 2015 to two years and six months. The chairmanship of Seoul Economic Daily subsequently passed to Chang Jae-min, under whom the paper has continued as an independently run company.

It has established various awards such as Seoul Economic Daily Advertising Awards in 2000, Korea Emerging Technology Awards and Young Frontier Awards in 2002, and e-Commerce Awards in 2003.

== Online operations ==
Seoul Economic Daily publishes online and operates an English-language edition.

=== AI projects ===
In the mid-2020s, Seoul Economic Daily developed a set of newsroom AI tools under the name AI LINK, used in editorial production, personalised news delivery, video generation and translation. Aju Press described AI LINK as an AI-powered newsroom cycle covering production, personalisation, video and global distribution, and in 2026 it received a grand prize at the Korea Online Newspaper Association's Digital Journalism Innovation Awards. At the 2026 WAN-IFRA Digital Media Awards, AI LINK won in the Best AI-Driven News Product, Format or Strategy category.
