= National Revolutionary Party (South Korea, 2020) =

National Revolutionary Party 국가혁명당
- Abbreviation: NRP
- Secretary-General: Song Soon-kwon
- Honorary Leader: Huh Kyung-young
- Interim Leader: Song Soon-kwon
- Founded: 15 August 2019 (as National Revolutionary Party); 21 October 2019 (as National Revolutionary Dividends Party); 16 June 2020 (as National Revolutionary Party)
- Ideology: Populism; Social conservatism
- Colours: Red
- National Assembly: 0 / 300
- Metropolitan Mayors and Governors: 0 / 16
- Municipal Mayors: 0 / 227
- Municipal Councillors: 0 / 3,034

Website
- nrparty.kr

Korean name
- Hangul: 국가혁명당
- Hanja: 國家革命黨
- RR: Gukga hyeongmyeongdang
- MR: Kukka hyŏngmyŏngdang

The National Revolutionary Party (Korean: 국가혁명당) is a South Korean political party formed in 2019.

== History ==
The party was formed by Huh Kyung-young, a former presidential candidate in 1997 and 2007. Huh was formerly banned from politics for 10 years in 2008 for slander that he would marry Park Geun-hye, a former pre-presidential candidate that lost to Lee Myung-bak at the Grand National Party preselection. Shortly after his political ban was lifted on 24 December 2018, he declared to run for the upcoming presidential election.

On 8 January 2019, Huh announced he would form a new political party named the National Revolutionary Party (Korean: 국가혁명당). The party was officially formed on 15 August and elected Huh as the party President, as well as its presidential candidate for the next election. It changed to the National Revolutionary Dividends Party (국가혁명배당금당; 國家革命配當金黨) on 21 October.

Following the 2020 election, the party reverted to the current name.

== Ideology ==
In terms of economy, the political stance is compressed into an attempt to achieve a welfare state while maintaining emphasis on a market economy, and citing a social conservative attitude that values cultural morality and existing social conditions. It is also in a position to push strongly against corruption and political reform.

The party President, Huh, criticised both left-wing and right-wing politics as "useless". He also added that South Korea needs a "surgery", not a "reform".

The party announced its "33 manifestos" seeking revolutions in various issues, including political, economic, regional and agricultural issues.

=== Economy ===
The party added "Dividends" (배당금) to its name due to its manifesto, in which it would like to pay 1,500,000 won (≒ 1,500 USD) to all citizens older than 18 years of age.

Cho Young-tae, a lecturer in Seoul National University, analysed that Huh's manifesto to pay 30,000,000 won (≒ 30,000 USD) for childbirth is similar to the Moon Jae-in government.

=== Diplomacy ===
The party wants to move the Headquarters of the United Nations from New York to the Korean Peninsula. Years before the party was founded, Huh advocated that the UN Headquarters should be moved to Panmunjom.

During the formation convention, Huh criticised President of the Republic Moon Jae-in for supporting the Democratic Federal Republic of Korea as the model for Korean reunification; the idea was suggested by North Korea. Regarding anti-Japanese sentiment, he urged Moon to apologise to Japan.

=== Parliamentary reform ===
The party supports reducing the total number of MPs from 300 to 100. It opposes payment for MPs.

=== Education ===
The party seeks an educational reform, including the abolition of the CSAT and school fee system. Huh denounced the incumbent education system as "making talents of fools", saying "Albert Einstein would fail if he applied to Seoul National University."

== Controversy ==
Prior to the 2020 election, the party was widely condemned for having too many pre-candidates convicted of crimes. Kim Sung-ki, who plans to run as the MP candidate for Busan West-East, had been jailed for 2 years for murder in August 1982. Kim Sung-ho, a pre-candidate for Goryeong-Seongju-Chilgok, was accused of defamation.

== Election results ==
=== President ===
Election	Candidate	Votes	%	Result
2022	Huh Kyung-young	281,481	0.83	Not elected

=== Legislature ===
Election	Leader	Constituency				Party list				Seats		Position	Status
Election	Leader	Votes	%	Seats	+/-	Votes	%	Seats	+/-	No.	+/–	Position	Status
2020	Huh Kyung-young	208,324	0.72	0 / 253	new	200,657	0.72	0 / 47	new	0 / 300	new	▲11th	Extra-parliamentary
2024	Song Soon-kwon	—N/a				67,420	0.24	0 / 47	0	0 / 300	0	▲10th	Extra-parliamentary
