= Cho Eunhee (politician) =

South Korean politician

Member of the National Assembly
- Incumbent
- Assumed office 10 March 2022
- Constituency: Seocho A (Seoul)

Mayor of Seocho
- In office 1 June 2014 – 9 November 2021

Cho Eunhee (Korean: 조은희) is a South Korean politician. Cho is a member of the South Korean National Assembly and People's Power Party. Cho was first elected to the National Assembly in 2022. Cho was the governor of Seocho District. She was selected as the best local government head by the Korean National Council of Women for her work increasing women's rights.

== Election results ==
=== General elections ===
Year	Elections	Constituency	Political party	Votes (%)	Results
2022	March 2022 By-election	Seocho A (Seoul)	PPP	84,364 (72.72%)	Won
2024	22nd National Assembly General Election	Seocho A (Seoul)	PPP	74,813 (68.44%)	Won

=== Local elections ===
==== Mayor of Seocho ====
Year	Elections	Constituency	Political party	Votes (%)	Remarks
2014	6th Iocal Election	Mayor of Seocho	Saenuri	108,482 (49.86%)	Won
2018	7th Iocal Election	Mayor of Seocho	LKP	117,542 (52.38%)	Won
