= Hankook Ilbo =

South Korean daily newspaper

- Type: Daily newspaper
- Format: Broadsheet
- Owner: Dongwha Enterprise
- Publisher: Seung Myung-ho
- Founded: June 9, 1954
- Political alignment: Centrism; Fiscal conservatism; Cultural liberalism
- Language: Korean
- Headquarters: Seoul, South Korea
- Country: South Korea
- Circulation: 213,200+
- Website: www.hankookilbo.com

Korean name
- Hangul: 한국일보
- Hanja: 韓國日報
- Lit.: Korea Daily
- RR: Hanguk ilbo
- MR: Han'guk ilbo

Hankook Ilbo (Korean: 한국일보; lit. 'Korea Daily') is a Korean language daily newspaper based in Seoul, South Korea. As of 2017, it had a daily circulation of about 213,200.

Hankook Ilbo was previously published by the Hankook Ilbo Media Group, but following an embezzlement scandal in 2013–2014, it was sold to Dongwha Enterprise, which also owns The Korea Times.

== Political position ==
Hankook Ilbo tends to be economically centre-right and socially centre-left. Hankook Ilbo is liberal in the Korean meaning, which is different from the meaning of liberal in the American political context.

Hankook Ilbo officially does not put forward ideology other than centrism, but has basically shown a fiscal conservative tone that values "fiscal responsibility". The newspaper has often criticized the Moon Jae-in government's fiscal policy for its lack of awareness of "financial soundness" (Korean: 재정건전성). This newspaper also supports "liberal economy".

In contrast to the somewhat conservative tendency financially, Hankook Ilbo has some cultural liberal tendency. The newspaper supported LGBT and other minority rights and emphasized "diversity". Hankook Ilbo has criticized the hatred of obesity in Korean society with a favored view of feminism.

== See also ==
- Economic liberalism
- The Economist
- List of newspapers in South Korea
- The Korea Times
