= News1 =

Israeli news website

- Website type: News
- Available in: Hebrew
- Country of origin: Israel
- Website: www.news1.co.il (in Hebrew)

News1, also known by its former name News First Class (NFC), is an Israeli news website concentrating on investigative journalism. The website was established by investigative reporter Yoav Yitzhak, who is the chief editor and contributing journalist.

In 2011, Yitzhak returned to his former employer Maariv when the two signed an agreement in which the print newspaper will publish Yitzhak's investigative reporting.
