= The Korea Economic Daily =

South Korean daily newspaper

- Type: Daily economic newspaper
- Format: Broadsheet
- Owner: Korea Economic Media Group
- Founded: October 12, 1964
- Language: Korean
- Headquarters: Jung-gu, Seoul, South Korea
- Country: South Korea
- Website: www.kedglobal.com

Korean name
- Hangul: 한국경제신문
- Hanja: 韓國經濟新聞
- RR: Hanguk gyeongje sinmun
- MR: Han'guk kyŏngje sinmun

The Korea Economic Daily (Korean: 한국경제신문), nicknamed Hankyung (한경), is a conservative business daily newspaper in South Korea. It is the largest business newspaper by revenue in South Korea. It was founded on October 12, 1964, as the Daily Economic Newspaper and took its current name in 1980. One of its owner's subsidiaries owns TenAsia, an entertainment news source.
