= South Korean web culture =

South Korean web culture indicates distinct activities that South Korean Internet users enjoy on the web. Synonyms include cyberculture, technoculture, virtual community culture, post-human culture, and high tech culture. Cyberculture in South Korea is more like a virtual community culture than anything else. Most of the Internet users are in the 10-49 age range. People often access the Internet through cyber cafes (Korean: PC방; PC bang).

Most of the activities are targeted to teenagers and college students. Young people who feel more comfortable texting than talking are known as the "thumb tribe". The LG Mobile World Cup, an international competition held on January 14, 2010, in which participants competed using their texting speed and accuracy was won by a pair of South Koreans.

Highly urbanized at 92%, South Koreans lead a distinctive urban lifestyle; half of them live in high-rises concentrated in the Seoul Capital Area with 25 million residents. The rise of online social activities closely mirrors the wider cultural trend towards shared spaces, such as the habitual use of coffee houses.

South Korea enjoys the world's swiftest Internet speeds and the highest rate of Internet penetration but also suffers from very high censorship of content. Internet culture is particularly prominent in South Korea with its influence of video games, video content, and streaming services.

== Major activities ==
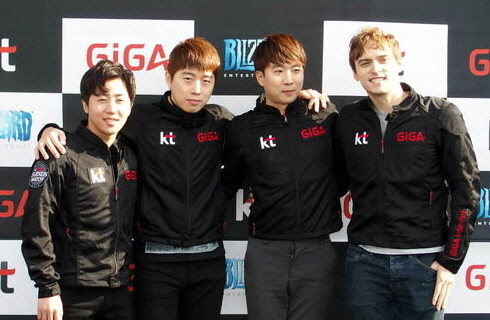
KT-hosted 'Giga Legend Match' eSports Event 3

=== Video games as spectator sports ===
Video games and the watching of video games is very popular. South Korea leads the world in video games as spectator sports.

Blizzard Entertainment entered into a co-marketing agreement with Korean Air that lasted for six months, in which two of the airline's airplanes on both domestic and international routes prominently displayed StarCraft II advertising featuring Jim Raynor on the fuselage.

This popularity has led to a natural rise in famous commentators on web games as part of the wider blogging community.

It is noted that South Korea served as a significant influence in the development of esports internationally. The creation of the Korea e-Sports Association (KeSPA) in October 2003 was the first esports association in the world. This organization put into practice various regulations and foundations as well as promoted competitive esports leagues. In further expansion of esports across Korea, the Korean Air Force established a military affiliate esports team called Air Force Challenges e-Sports (ACE). This allowed those serving their required military time to explore esports as a career.

Large esports teams have exploded in popularity T1 is the prime esports team in South Korea. They hold a number 1 ranked position in Overwatch 2 along with other teams that compete in games such as Valorant and Tekken 8.

=== Blogging ===
Just like other countries, blogging is also popular in South Korea. Post topics range from personal reflections on philosophical conjectures to simple everyday life stories. Some of the popular Korean blog hosting websites include Naver Blog, Egloos, Blogin (defunct), Daum Blog, Yahoo! Korea Blog, Tistory, and Textcube.com (defunct). Two major portals for online communities in South Korea are Daum and Naver. Both operate as open public forums, or cafés, hosting a wide range of discussion topics—from entertainment, idols, and popular culture to more serious subjects like family, education, politics, and religion.

=== Instant messaging ===
In Korea, the most popular online messengers include NateOn, KakaoTalk, MSN Messenger, BuddyBuddy, Sayclub Tachy and more NateOn is known to have surpassed the usage share of MSN, now claiming the most number of users among messengers used in Korea. The apps are popular because some of them offer significantly more than just services related to instant messaging. KakaoTalk the most used instant messenger in South Korea provides several services including: banking, online shopping and transport. Many of these services have appeared to develop beyond the idea of just an instant messenger app they have become a way of life.

The country also ranks in the top 25 of fastest internet speeds in the world, making it one of the prime locations for instant messaging.

=== Q&A ===
Some search engine websites also provide "knowledge searches", which is an answer to a question that has been asked by another search engine user. For example, in Naver Knowledge iN registered users can post a question on any topic of their choice. Some users ask very personal questions pertaining to relationships and the like, since the user's real identity is not exposed.

When various users answer a question they are awarded a certain number of points, the person who asked the question can then select the best answer and will be awarded points. This user can then ask questions on the website using the points that he/she was awarded. The users with most points are ranked daily with the option to display their real identities, if they choose to do so.

=== Webtoons ===
"Webtoon" (Hangul: 웹툰, RR: wep-tun) is a South Korean webcomic, or manhwa that is published online. The Korean web portal Daum created a webtoon service in 2003, as did Naver in 2004. These services regularly release webtoons that are available for free. According to David Welsh of Bloomberg, comics account for a quarter of all book sales in South Korea, while more than 3 million Korean users paid to access online manhwa and 10 million users read free webcomics.

As of July 2014, Naver had published 520 webtoons while Daum had published 434. Since the early 2010s, services such as Tapastic and Line Webtoon have begun to officially translate webtoons into English. Examples of popular webtoons that have been translated into English are The Breaker, Girls of the Wild's, The Gamer, Noblesse, The God of High School, and Tower of God. In recent years, these webtoons have been gaining popularity in Western markets, rivalling Japanese manga. Some of them have even adapted in popular anime.

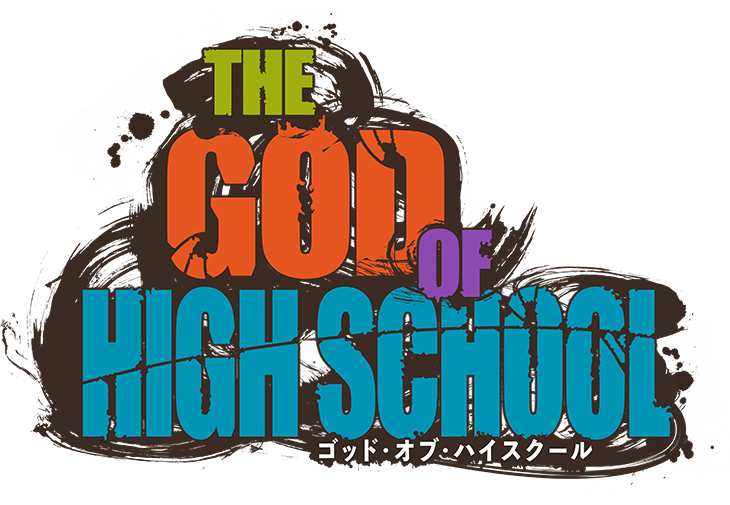
Logo from God of Highschool anime adaptation.

As digital comics have emerged as a popular medium, print publication of manhwa has decreased. The amount of material published in webtoon form has now reached an equal amount as that published offline.

Webtoons highlight a technological aspect of Koreans online culture and design, specifically they are designed with the intention of to be read by scrolling. A development made to make the reading of webtoons not only different but also more streamlined.

=== Bitcoin trading ===
As bitcoin trading and virtual money trading are gaining popularity in South Korea, buzzwords related with these trading are getting popular on SNS and other communities.

- GAZUA (가즈아) - is kind of a magic word. People say it when they want express their hope that bitcoin's price goes up to their expectation. literally it means 'Go'. People started using this word in real world.
- Jonber (존버) - word represent 'Do not sell the coin till price goes high'
- Yeongcha Yeongcha (영차영차) - The sound that many people put together to strengthen their energy. People use this word as a hope to increase price of virtual cash.

The country has a large community of online crypto trading with the most popular currency's in South Korea are Bitcoin, Ethereum and Pi PI.

=== Online video ===
South Koreans appear to be avid users of online video with thousands watching online stars doing everyday things like eating. This phenomenon known as Mukbang became widely popular across the internet. This form of entertainment served as a channel of connectedness, fulfillment of multi-sensory experiences, or simply performative display for viewers to enjoy.

Search volume for K-pop since 2008 according to Google Trends

South Korea has become something of a cultural giant exporting music (K-pop) through web-based viral success. A notable worldwide success from this approach is Gangnam Style and by September 2012 entered the Guinness World Records as the most "liked" video on YouTube.

=== Internet communities ===
Internet communities can be referred as the nests of cyberculture in South Korea. Hit-cyberculture on internet communities often permeate even offline. One such area is in language, via memes, and popular slang. There are various communities such as:

1. DC inside - DC inside has an internet community has many forums (a.k.a. gallery) for different interests. This community was organized as community of interest for cameras and sharing photographs for amateur photographers at first, but its purpose was changed to Internet community. There are forums about almost everything. People who have same interest can discuss it on DC inside. In this process, many cybercultures are produced and consumed.
2. Todayhumor - Todayhumor is a popular Korean internet forum. Originally dedicated just to humor, it has since grown to encapsulate various different topics and interests. It is widely used, ranking as the most popular Korean internet community in 2014. Its users tend to be left-leaning politically, which generates some controversy for the website during election seasons.
3. Diesel Mania - Diesel Mania is an online community catering to those interested in substitution for purchasing Diesel Jean and True religion. The biggest male-fashion community in South Korea. This community has real-name policy. Because of it, this community's issues are less rather than other communities.
4. Cyworld is a hybrid between a blog and personal homepage. Although its primary prevalence is found in Korea, its influence has spread over China in recent years. Cyworld users range anywhere from elementary students to middle-aged adults. Cyworld requires a person's real identity (Koreans: verified by Korean national identification number (주민등록번호); Foreigners: scanned school/state ID, driver's license, or passport) to become a member. Since all identity is usually truthful and non-anonymous, users often use this to seek lost friends from childhood or former classmates on the website, or make and progress their friendship by system that called by 'mini-homepage (minihompy, 미니홈피)'. Similar to blogs, many people share their thoughts and photos that other friends (called 일촌, il-chon) can comment on. A typical 'mini-homepage' features a main page, a photographic album, a guest book, and a personal diary. Users are given many choices for personalizing their pages with music, backgrounds, and even fonts. One of the major differences between Cyworld and blogs is that Cyworld is optimized for the users who prefer to write very short and succinct diaries. One popular personalized feature is the 'mini-room (미니룸)', where a user is given a single rectangular room to decorate with different objects. These objects (as well as personalized features) are bought with online dollars called dotori (acorn, in English). Every user is given a 'mini-me (미니미)', a caricature. Although each user is given a prototype, gender-appropriate figure, they liberally personalize these figures with a variety of dress and hairstyle options. Because the website contains mostly truthful information, social issues have been raised such as Cyber-bullying.
5. The Angel Halo wiki, the predecessor of Namuwiki, was founded on March 1, 2007. It specialized in animation, comics, and Internet neologism. It was popular because of its unique narrative method of mixing jokes such as puns, and various people continued to write for it making it bigger. It changed its name to the Rigveda wiki in 2012. However, it became one of the alternative wikis forking this wiki when it became impossible to operate due to the debacle of the Rigveda wiki operator privatizing wikis, and it was made up as a separate site that backed up about 90% of the Rigveda wiki documents. After the privatization of the Rigveda wiki, most of its users became Namuwiki and Libre Wiki users. The familiar language, jokes and puns used by Namuwiki users appealed to the public's preferences for more casual stories rather than hard explanations. The size of the Korean version of Wikipedia is much smaller than those of other languages, making Namuwiki more popular.

=== Streaming platforms ===
Many cyberculture are produced on internet streams. There are many contents such as Mukbang, gaming, and visible radio in streaming platforms. stream Jockey(BJ) try to make their own streams' atmosphere and sometimes it would be a new cyberculture. Communication between the streamer and real-time viewer is one of the most important things in a stream. In this process, culture can be created and this immediately surfaces and quickly transmitted in Internet communities.

Live streaming has been integrated in South Korea as a form of public communication and as a rising full-time career. It became widely accepted for its convenient participatory aspect between the hosts and user. The most popular live-streaming platforms include YouTube, Twitch, and Soop. A Large void in the streaming market has been left with the exit of Twitch in South Korea on February 27, 2024. Despite that fact, platforms like Soop have been doing very well reporting 98 million hours watched in 2024. Live streaming has been used as one of the first lines of communication for political news and popular culture influence. Due to its real time nature, live streaming content is less likely to be edited or manipulated allowing the audience to feel more connected. In 2017, former President Park Geun Hye live streamed her first interview on YouTube regarding her scandal.

== K-pop ==
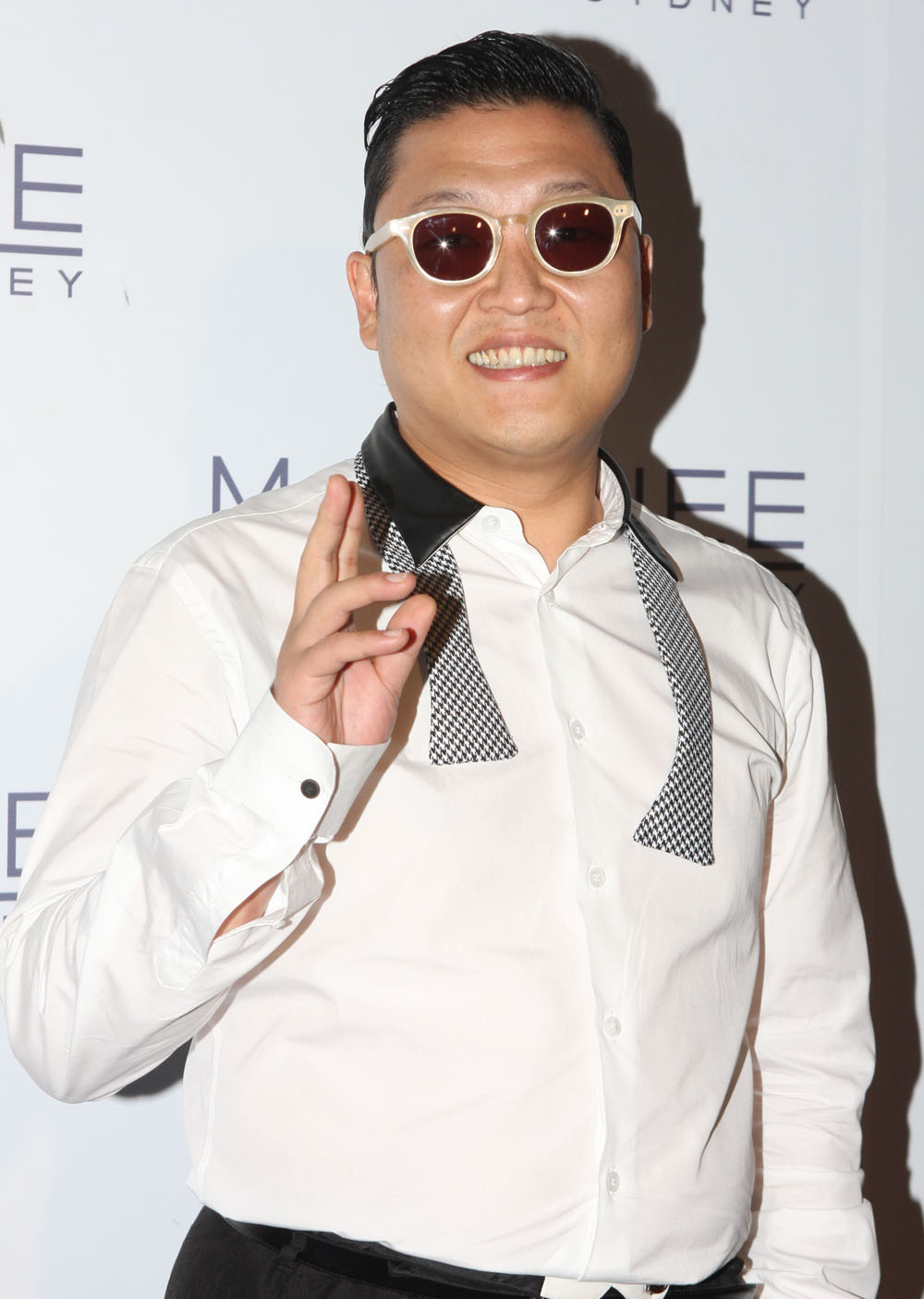
PSY, whose music video for "Gangnam Style" became the first to reach more than a billion YouTube views

A large part of Korean internet culture is Korean pop music, or K-pop. Super groups like BTS report over 24 million monthly listeners on Spotify and their most streamed song dynamite has reported over 2 billion streams. Other artists such as PSY have a large presence and with songs like Gangnam Style have even been able to make large waves in the west.

K-pop's large presence within the country has influenced many things such as fashion and beauty. it is a large part of shaping Korea's image in other countries. American shows like Family Guy have even parodied the style of K-pop with the episodes such as Candy Quahog Marshmallow.

=== Music videos ===
Music videos are a major part of K-pop's online culture. Many groups have music videos with more than one billion views. Artists such as Blackpink and PSY have videos among the 100 most-viewed on YouTube.

== Criticism and cultural burnout ==
=== Criticism on safety and reliability ===
Many of the online security breaches in South Korea seem to stem from a common use of comparatively outdated browsers and security software.

The country has often favored domestic technologies, this is due to a new government led development mode. While this has largely been cited as what separates South Koreas internet technology from the rest of the world the model does have several vulnerability's that the country has had to address.

Many large groups in the country have been the victim of major hacks, as recently as February 2025 Wemix a company that functions as a block chain for popular gaming company Wemade was hit with a major hack that lost the company $6.2 million on the 28th of February.

=== Detoxing from the Internet ===
South Korea is often considered one of the most technology advanced and plugged in society's in the modern world. It's estimated that approximately 95% of adults a have a smartphones. The country is known for things such as internet cafes most that are open 24 hours and provide access to anyone who wishes to use the internet.

The somewhat over use internet has led to people coming to seek professional help and undergo a bit of an internet detox. People have cited their professional and personal relationships being effected and have to come to seek some professional help. The government has also stepped in to help with the groups such as the National Center for Youth Internet Addiction Treatment have started holding camps with the intention of helping youth affected by technology addiction.

== See also ==
- Cyber defamation law
