= Empas =

1998–2009 South Korean web portal

- Website type: Web portal
- Owner: SK Communications
- Creator: Empas Corporation
- Website: www.empas.com
- Commercial: Yes
- Registration: Optional
- Launched: 1998
- Current status: Sold and merged with Nate

Empas (Korean: 엠파스) was a South Korean internet search engine and web portal.

== Name ==
The service was launched in 1998 by Knowledge Plant Corporation (지식발전소), which changed its name to Empas Corporation in 2004. The name Empas is a combination of e-media and compass. It merged with Nate in 2009.

== History ==
Empas was one of South Korea's most popular web search engines, and competed with Daum, Nate, and Naver. Empas was the second most popular web portal in the country from 2000 to 2001, by unique page view. Since the dominance of Naver started in 2003, however, the market share of Empas declined, and by late 2005, it had fallen into the fifth place amongst the South Korean web portals. In 2006, aiming to check its main competition Naver's rapid expansion, SK Communications (which owned South Korea's popular social networking website Cyworld) acquired Empas on 19 October 2006.

With the reorganisation of SK Communications's business fields, Empas was merged with Nate.com, which was the original web portal of SK Communications, and became Nate on 1 March 2009.

== See also ==
- Search engine
- Timeline of web search engines
- Naver
- Kakao
- Nate
