= KakaoMusic =

2013–2017 South Korean music service

- Developer: Kakao
- Release: 2013
- Operating system: iOS, Android, watchOS, Wear OS
- Available in: Korean
- Type: music streaming
- Website: Official website

KakaoMusic (Korean: 카카오뮤직) was a music streaming service launched by Kakao. It lets users stream and buy music while also allowing them to share songs and connect with friends through KakaoTalk. In 2017, Kakao merged Kakao Music into Melon, the company’s other music streaming service.

People can create their own music rooms where friends can listen to their collection of songs and leave comments. It also lets users set background music to their pages on KakaoTalk and KakaoStory.

As part of their push to try to re-enter the Japanese market, Kakao planned to launch their music service in Japan to complement KakaoTalk, Kakao T, and Piccoma.

As of 2021, the market share of Kakao Music was 3.05%, behind Melon (37.28%), Genie Music (19.24%), YouTube Music (19.22%) and Naver Vibe (4.08%).

== See also ==
- Kakao
- Kakao M
- Melon
