= Kim Bum-soo =

Kim Bum-soo or Kim Beom-soo (Korean: 김범수) is a Korean name consisting of the family name Kim and the given name Bum-soo, and may refer to:

- Kim Bum-soo (singer) (born 1979), South Korean singer
- Kim Beom-soo (businessman) (born 1966), South Korean businessman, founder and chairman of Kakao
- Kim Bum-soo (footballer, born 1968), South Korean goalkeeper coach

== See also ==
- Kim Bong-soo (disambiguation)
