= Na Dong-hyun =

South Korean streamer and YouTuber (1978–2025)

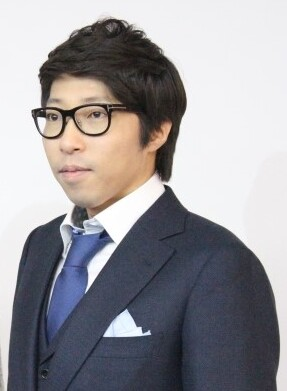
- Na in 2014
- Born: 31 October 1978; Yongsan District, Seoul, South Korea
- Died: 6 September 2025 (aged 46); Gwangjin District, Seoul, South Korea
- Occupations: Streamer; YouTuber
- Spouse: Lee Chae-won (m. 2015; div. 2023)

YouTube information
- Channel: BuzzBean11
- Years active: 2010–2025
- Subscribers: 1.47 million
- Last updated: September 21, 2025

Na Dong-hyun (Korean: 나동현; 31 October 1978 – 6 September 2025), widely known as his online alias Great Library (Korean: 대도서관; RR: Daedoseogwan) and BuzzBean11, was a South Korean streamer and YouTuber. Best known for his gaming videos, he was one of South Korea's "first-generation" streamers, and has been credited with popularizing online livestreaming in his home country. His popularity on YouTube gained him 1.4 million subscribers and 1.5 billion views.

== Life and career ==
Na Dong-hyun was born on 31 October 1978 in Yongsan District, Seoul, South Korea. According to his interviews with the Kyunghyang Shinmun and the MBC, Na was born in a financially struggling household. Likewise, he never enrolled in a university, and found a job in the IT sector, working under Etoos, an online education platform developer, and SK Communications. Na later recalled that his experiences as a manager for a media task force greatly influenced him to pursue a career as a freelancing streamer.

Na began his broadcasting career as an amateur music channel host in SayClub, a South Korean online chat website, in 2002. After retiring from SK Communications in 2009, Na began streaming on Daum tvPot in 2010, later switching platforms to AfreecaTV the following year. His livestreams mostly consisted of playthroughs of various video games, including Amnesia: The Dark Descent, Princess Maker 2, and Sid Meier's Civilization V. His online alias, Great Library, was named in reference to the Great Library of Alexandria, which appears as an in-game structure in Civilization V.

In 2010, Na created his YouTube account and uploaded his first video, surpassing 1 million subscribers by July 2015. He began streaming on YouTube in 2016.

On November 23, 2016, Na was appointed as a member of the Internet Culture Policy Advisory Committee by the Korea Communications Commission. In 2018, he was awarded the Best Male Newcomer Award in Entertainment at the Korea Culture and Entertainment Awards.

== Death ==
Na was found dead at his home in Gwangjin District, Seoul, on 6 September 2025, at the age of 46, merely two days after his last stream. His body was discovered by firefighters and police who were dispatched after receiving a report from an acquaintance that he had not shown up for an appointment and was not responding to their calls. No suicide notes or signs of break-ins at his home were reported. His ex-wife, Lee Chae-won, reported that the cause of his death was a cerebral hemorrhage.

Numerous fans and fellow streamers expressed their condolences over Na's death. The Chosun Ilbo described him as a "symbolic figure" in the "age of personal media" and a "pioneer of personal broadcasting". The Kyunghyang Shinmun credited him with popularizing online video game livestreaming in South Korea and developing a viable single-person streaming business model based on family-friendly content and corporate sponsors.
