= KakaoGroup =

South Korean communication app

- Developer(s): Kakao
- Initial release: 2013
- Type: group communication app
- Website: www.kakao.com

KakaoGroup (Korean: 카카오그룹) is a free private group communication app launched by South Korean company Kakao in 2013. This standalone app was specifically designed for communication among groups of friends, acquaintances, and colleagues. While other competing apps have built-in public group chat functions, the group chats in KakaoGroup are private. KakaoGroup operates alongside Kakao's public messaging service, KakaoTalk, allowing users to sync their messages between the two. The app is available for both iOS and Android mobile phones and can also be accessed through the KakaoGroup website. In addition to group messaging, KakaoGroup offers media sharing to private groups, a group-specific news feed, and support for the popular Kakao Emoji.
