= Hanbok Party =

South Korean organization promoting the wearing of hanbok

Hanbok Party (한복놀이단) is a society founded in April 2011 by Park Seon-young from Ewha Womans University. She has gathered like-minded individuals to introduce the charm of hanbok (Korean traditional clothes) to youth.

Park organized the society after she went to Japan and saw people on the streets wearing traditional clothes. In Korea, encountering someone wearing hanbok on the streets is unthinkable. This is because Koreans perceive hanbok as too uncomfortable and formal to wear casually. To overcome such a perception, and to enhance an understanding of the traditional glamour and beauty that hanbok entails, Park decided to create the group.

Park traced the reason for the bad impression of hanbok to a lack of recreational environments where people can enjoy themselves while wearing hanbok. She began to search for unique events that people could participate in. Park was looking for an event or some popular entertainment that has an immense ripple effect online, which led her to select the flash mob. A flash mob is often videotaped to depict people performing an unusual act for the purpose of entertainment.

Park decided to create a flash mob video showing a group of people wearing hanbok who suddenly assemble in a public place, perform a brief dance, and quickly disperse.

On 26 September 2011 at Hongdae Playground, 200 people in vivid and colorful hanbok gathered and began identical, choreographed movements to music. For its creative motivation and its devotion to Korean culture, Hanboknoridan is supported by Cyworld Dream Campaign, which strives to make a person's vision come true. The organization is also sponsored by SK Communications.
