= Kakao Pay =

Digital wallet service in South Korea

- Developer: Kakao
- Release: September 5, 2014; 12 years ago
- Operating system: Android iOS
- Platform: Android and iOS devices and WatchOS devices and Wear OS devices
- License: Proprietary
- Website: www.kakaopay.com

Kakao Pay (Korean: 카카오페이; stylized as kakaopay) is a mobile payment and digital wallet service by Kakao based in South Korea that allows users make mobile payments and online transactions. The service supports contactless payments using near-field communications and QR codes.

Kakao Pay is incorporated into KakaoTalk, the mobile instant messenger from Kakao.

== History ==
The payment service first launched on September 4, 2014, with integration with their messaging app, KakaoTalk, allowing people to request and send money to people in their contacts. Since its launch, Kakao has expanded into other financial services by launching their own online bank called KakaoBank and releasing their own debit card. In April 2017, KakaoPay Co., Ltd. was established to run the payment services operated by the company.

KakaoPay crossed the 10 million user mark after 20 months since its launch. More features have been added to the service like the ability to send remittances, send invoices, and complete online transactions on mobile. With the rapid increase in users and payment transactions, KakaoPay received a $200M investment from Alibaba's Ant Financial, the parent company of Alipay, a mobile payment service in China.

Kakao Pay went public in November 2021.

In April 2025, the Financial Supervisory Service fined Kakao Pay 15 billion won for giving shareholder Alipay Singapore Holdings 40 million users' data without their consent.

== See also ==
- kakao page
- NAVER Pay
