= Beom-soo =

- Hangul: 범수
- RR: Beomsu
- MR: Pŏmsu

Beom-soo, also spelled Bum-soo or Beom-su, is a Korean given name.

People with this name include:

- Kim Bum-soo (businessman) (born 1966), South Korean businessman
- Kim Bum-soo (footballer, born 1968), South Korean former football player and coach
- Lee Beom-soo (born 1970), South Korean actor
- Kim Bum-soo (born 1979), South Korean singer

== See also ==
- List of Korean given names
