= Ha Sangwook =

South Korean poet

- Born: March 21, 1981 (age 40); Seoul, South Korea
- Occupation: Poet
- Writing career
- Language: Korean

Ha Sangwook (born 1981 in Seoul, South Korea) is a South Korean poet. He writes short poems based on daily lives. He calls himself "Sipari", an acronym meaning a person who sells poems. He published the bestseller poetry collection Seoul Si (서울 시, Seoul Poetry) in 2013.

== Life ==
Ha was born in Seoul in 1981. He graduated from Konkuk University with a degree in Communication Design in 2009. He started working for Ridibooks, an e-book distribution company, and began posting his poems on Facebook in 2012. He sent out his poems through group emails, and received advice to publish them as an e-book.

Ha self-published an e-book poetry collection Seoul Si that was downloaded 30,000 times and owned by more than 100,000 readers in ten days. Seoul Si 1 and 2 were published in print in 2003 and became bestsellers. He was also a judge on a Twitter poetry writing competition. His poems have appeared on cigarette packs and textbooks.

Ha has many nicknames, such as "empathy poet", "sense machine", "si (poetry)-pop singer", not to mention the most well-known "Anipang poet". He calls himself "sipari", an acronym meaning a person who sells poems. He introduces himself as a singer songwriter who writes songs with poems out of superfluousness, and he names his music genre "si (poetry)-pop". He also released his single album "Hoesaneun gayaji (회사는 가야지/ But You've Gotta Go to Work)" in 2014.

== Writing style ==
Ha communicates with others through social media by writing short poems based on daily lives including relationships, love, and work. He became known after his one column poem with 16 characters about a mobile game "Anipang" (Seoroga/ Soholhaennendae/ Deokbune/ Sosikdeukkedwae/ 서로가/ 소홀했는데/ 덕분에/ 소식듣게 돼/ It's been a while/ since we've talked, thanks to it, I hear of you) was released. He writes poems that people can read comfortably on the screen of a phone. He arranges words in a manner that allows smartphone users to feel comfortable reading his poems and catch them at a glance. "Gomin/ hagedwae/ uri/ dulsai (고민/ 하게돼/ 우리/둘사이/Doubting/ Iam/ about/ youandme)" Congratulatory money: He used wrong spacing of words on purpose for design.

His short poems are considered to resemble Haiku. For the 'writer introduction' (jakgasogae in Korean) section of his book Ha put the photos of him (jakka, the author), a cow (so), and a dog (gae). And for the table of contents (mokcha in Korean), he put a photo of a person kicking (cha) someone else's neck (mok). He also places the title of a poem in the form of "from XX of Ha Sangwook's short collection of poems" at the end of a poem instead of the front, arousing readers' curiosity.

== Representative works ==
In his collection of poetry Seoul Si 1 & 2 (2013), Ha gave titles to his poems in the form of "from XX", proving that his poems were about life, based on his own experiences. In the collection, he wrote short poems expressing everyday life, disregarding age, values, religion, regions so that anyone can read and enjoy.

Hand-drawn pictures of the author are also found in the collection. Si ingneun bam: Si bam (시 읽는 밤 : 시 밤, Night of Reading Poems, 2015) received favorable reviews as it is written about love with a sense of humor, and easily relatable to many. Eoseolpeun wirobatgi : Siro (어설픈 위로받기 : 시로/ Lame Comfort : by Poetry, 2018) is known as a collection of poetry comforting those who are tired of work, relationships, and life.

== Works ==
=== Poetry collections ===
- Seoul Si 1 (서울 시 1 Seoul Poetry 1), Joongang Books, 2013
- Seoul Si 2 (서울 시 Seoul Poetry 2), Joongang Books, 2013
- Si ingneun bam : Si bam, (시 읽는 밤 Night of reading poems) Yedam, 2015
- Eoseolpeun wirobatgi: Siro, (어설픈 위로받기: 시로, Lame Comfort : by Poetry) Wisdom House, 2018

=== Essay collections ===
- Tube, Himnaelji maljineun naega gyeoljeonghae (튜브, 힘낼지 말지는 내가 결정해. Tube, It's Me Who Decides Whether to Keep the Steam Up or Not., Arte, 2019)

== Awards ==
- Interpark Rookie Award (인터파크 루키상, 2013)
- A Man of the Hour – To Move the Modern Heart – Social Media Poet Ha Sangwook_#001, EBS Culture
- "Interview: Unfailing Comfort Given by "Sipari" Ha Sangwook" SBS News, May 3, 2019
