= KakaoStyle =

Korean mobile application

- Developer(s): Kakao
- Operating system: iOS, Android
- Available in: Korean
- Type: social network
- Website: style.kakao.com

KakaoStyle (Hangul: 카카오스타일) is a mobile application that curates and aggregates fashion content, links, stores, and information from various websites. KakaoTalk users are able to discover various fashion trends using the app, and see what their friends their friends' interests. The app gives suggestions, and links to purchase clothing and various items.
