= KakaoBank =

Internet-based South Korean bank

- Native name: 주식회사 카카오뱅크
- Type: Public
- Traded as: KRX: 323410
- Industry: Financial services
- Founded: January 22, 2016; 10 years ago
- Headquarters: Pangyo, Gyeonggi-do, South Korea
- Key people: Yun Ho-young, CEO
- Services: Online banking Mobile banking Loan and deposit Debit card Credit Card; Overseas remittance
- Net income: ₩649.4 billion (US$484.53 million) (Q4, 2025)
- Owners: Kakao Corp., Korea Investment Value Asset Management
- Number of employees: 952 (March 2021)
- Website: www.kakaobank.com eng.kakaobank.com

KakaoBank Corp. (stylized as Kakaobank; Korean: 주식회사 카카오뱅크) is a South Korean financial institution specializing in mobile banking services and financial technology. It was founded in 2016 through a collaboration between Korea Investment Holdings and Kakao Corp.

== History ==
KakaoBank launched July 2017, acquiring over 300,000 customers within its inaugural 24-hour period and two million customers within a fortnight. In June 2019, the bank reported deposits totaling ₩17.6 trillion (US$15.57 billion) and loans amounting to ₩11.3 trillion (US$10 billion). As of July 11, 2019, KakaoBank boasted a customer base exceeding 10 million individuals. That same year, KakaoBank reported its first net profit.

In 2021, KakaoBank reported a customer count surpassing 17.4 million, with 14.7 million monthly active users. By the end of 2025, KakaoBank had 26.7 customers with 20 million monthly active users.

=== Valuation ===
In October 2020, KakaoBank achieved a corporate valuation of approximately KRW 8.6 trillion, following a capital infusion of KRW 750 billion from U.S.-based private equity firm TPG Capital and existing shareholders. By the end of 2025, KakaoBank had 26.7 customers, with 20 million active users.

=== IPO ===
On September 25, 2020, KakaoBank publicly disclosed its intention to initiate an Initial Public Offering (IPO). The bank selected KB Security and Credit Suisse to serve as lead managers for its IPO, with Citi appointed as a co-manager. According to a report from local media, KakaoBank was scheduled to submit its IPO application to a Korean exchange on April 15, 2021. Kakao Bank went public in October 2021.

=== Expansion into foreign markets ===
In 2023, KakaoBank expanded into the Indonesian market by acquiring a 10% stake in the Indonesian digital bank, Superbank, which began publicly trading in 2025. Also in 2023, KakaoBank formed a consortium with SCB X, the holding company for a leading Thai bank, Siam Commercial Bank. In 2025, the KakaoBank-SCB X consortium was granted a license to bank in Thailand, and in January 2026, an agreement was signed to launch a digital banking platform in Thailand in partnership with the Chinese bank WeBank. This makes KakaoBank the first Korean bank to enter the Thai market since the 1997 Asian financial crisis.

== App ==
KakaoBank utilizes modern Know Your Customer (KYC) methods such as the use of a selfie as proof of identity. In July 2019, KakaoBank's Android app was identified as the leading banking application in Korea, by monthly active users and number of downloads.

A significant shareholder, Kakao Corp, operates the messaging application KakaoTalk, which was used by 88% of South Koreans at the bank's inception.

== List of past bank presidents ==
- Yun Ho-yeong (2016–present)
- Lee Young-u (2016–2020)

== See also ==
- List of banks in South Korea
