= Chang Xiaoyu =

Chinese content creator

Chang Xiaoyu (Chinese: 常小雨) is a content creator from Benxi, Liaoning Province, known as Northeast Rain Sister. In January 2021, Northeast Rain Sister released her first video on Kuaishou, introducing her daily life in Northeast China. Later, she joined Douyin and Weibo. In October 2024, she was banned from the Douyin platform due to a series of controversial incidents.

== Biography ==
Chang Xiaoyu is from Benxi, Liaoning. Her father died when she was 3, and her mother remarried when she was 9. After her mother remarried, Chang lived with her grandparents. Later, she met Bai Guohui (also known as Lao Kuai), married and started their own family. Before becoming a self-media blogger, Chang and Lao Kuai planted crops. Later, they opened a farm stay and started making short-form content. They recruited a professional team to run their business. In 2021, Chang posted her first video on Kuaishou, which introduced her daily life in Northeastern China. Later, Chang came to the posted videos about rural customs and food.

In November 2022, Chang released the video "Cutting Hair", which went viral. In 2023, Chang released a video about stocking up on New Year's goods, which triggered a surge in views. After one month, her views increased to 3 million.

In September 2023, Chang started to sell goods. Her live broadcast helped farmers sell goods worth 5 million yuan. Since the beginning of the Chang live broadcast until it was banned, she has live broadcast 28 times to sell goods, with a cumulative sales of over 100 million yuan. However, due to product quality problems, the number of views of Chang plummeted. In 2024, netizens visited and found that the Chang's live broadcast base in Benxi was deserted. In October of the same year, Douyin banned her account and other accounts also stopped updating.

On August 11, 2025, according to a staff member of the Internet Information Office of Benxi Manchu Autonomous County, Northeast Rain Sister could theoretically be unblocked in October, provided that she had rectified her behavior. The Cyberspace Administration of China and the market supervision department will also continue to supervise it.
