= Kakao Friends =

Fictional characters of the Kakao brand

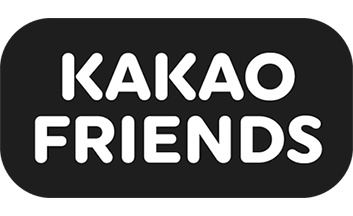
- First appearance: November 2012
- Created by: Kakao
- Designed by: Hozo (Kwon Soon-ho)

In-universe information
- Full name: Ryan (Lion); Choonsik (Cat); Apeach (Peach); Tube (Duck); Con (Crocodile); Muzi (Radish); Frodo (Dog); Neo (Cat); Jay-G (Mole)

Kakao Friends (stylized as KAKAO FRIENDS; Korean: 카카오프렌즈) are featured characters based on KakaoTalk emoticons released in November 2012 by Kakao. The copyrights of the characters are currently owned and managed by Kakao's subsidiary Kakao IX, which was formerly named Kakao Friends prior to an inter-subsidiary acquisition in 2018.

The character illustrator is Kwon Soon-ho, also known by his pen name Hozo. Kakao Friends has been used in various products and commercials, and has gained popularity and have become beloved characters in South Korea.

== Characters ==
Kakao Friends from the Muzi, Frodo and Ryan series.

Kakao Friends characters were developed in about two months after the idea meeting in July 2012 began.

=== Muzi series ===
- Muzi: Curious and playful, Muzi is actually a piece of radish in rabbit clothes.
- Con: Con, who looks like a small crocodile, raised Muzi. He works as a detective. Depictions of Con always show only one side of his face.
- Apeach: Apeach is a being with a peach head and human-esque body, who is monoecious due to a genetic modification. Kakao made a short-form animation of Apeach, PeachFive (피치파이브), which launched in April 2021.
- Jay-G: Jay-G is a mole whose hometown is underground. He is a fan of, and his name is a reference to, the American hip-hop artist Jay-Z.

=== Frodo series ===
- Frodo: Frodo is a rich-born dog from the city. He is self-conscious about being a mixed-blooded dog. He usually wears a red dog collar or a tie. Frodo is officially a couple with Neo, the cat character.
- Neo: Neo is a cat character with a bob cut wig and she is the girlfriend of Frodo.
- Tube: Tube is a duck. He is insecure about his small feet, so he wears flippers. If he feels extreme fear or anger, he spits fire out of his mouth and turns into a crazy green duck.

=== Ryan series ===
- Ryan: The character named Ryan was newly announced on January 22, 2016. Ryan is a male lion without a mane. Ryan was a successor to the throne of Dung Dung Island, but he decided royalty was not for him. A lot of people misunderstand him because of his expressionless face, but his character is that of a trustworthy mentor who has delicate emotions. Ryan's tail was designed to be short because it was considered cuter. He has a pet cat, Choonsik. On Kakaopage, a webtoon called Ryan the lion was published in a series from October 26, 2020, to January 25, 2021.
- Choonsik: Choonsik is a non-binary stray cat who is adopted by Ryan. Their favorite food is pumpkin sweet potato. Raongi, Nyan and Choonsik were all names considered for the character, and Choonsik won on Instagram on September 10, 2020.

=== Niniz series ===
Niniz series characters.

- Penda Jr.: Penda is an alien animal that made a crash landing in snowtown. It is Ratser Panda who dreams of revenge.
- Scappy: Scappy was originally a polar bear, but became a rabbit. Also, Scappy is the most popular chef in Snowtown.
- Kero & Berony: They are playful twin penguin brother and sister. They can be distinguished by the shell hairpin on their head.
- Jordy: Jordy is a dinosaur that has been kept secret since its existence. On September 18, 2020, it hosted the Jordy pop-up store at the Kakao Friends Shop in Gangnam.
- Cob & Bbanya: They are curious crows and hippos. They act as Snowtown's detectives.
- Angmond: Angmond is a chocolate-loving harp seal.

== Products and shop ==
Many Kakao Friends products have been produced, ranging from foods, games, household supplies, finance, and more.

Beginning in Sinchon in April 2014, the company opened a store in the form of a pop-up store in major department stores in major cities such as Daegu and Busan, and several stores were established as regular stores. In addition to the character products sold in stores, KaKao Friends characters are used in collaboration with other companies in other fields.

In May 2021, Kakao VX has started a premium golf driving range business using Kakao Friends characters.

In 2018, Kakao has released Kakao Little Friends Phone, a smartphone dedicated to elementary school students that has enhanced protection for their children. Kakao Little Friends Phone was released up to version 4 by 2021.

== Controversy ==
=== Kakao series ===
After seeing the structure in which Daum Kakao owns all the copyrights of Kakao Friends, the character illustrators do not receive profits from the sale of Kakao Friends character products, some criticized whether it was the second Cloud Bread incident. However, the Daum Kakao official said that Daum Kakao had all the copyrights at the time of the first contract with the HOZO writer. Although the Kakao Talk emoticon revenue is shared, the Kakao Friends business does not pay a separate fee to the artist. The author also stated that he is in a position to avoid controversy about this issue.

=== Niniz series ===
It has been embroiled in controversy that it promotes violence and cruelty on social media. The fact that the character description of 'Panda', whose last name is 'only one', contains the phrase, "The goal is to dry out all the polar bears," and Cobb & Panya, introduced as a detective duo, "has a stalker temperament and likes to follow. ", etc. has been raised. People criticized it, pointing out that the main users of the character were minors.

== See also ==
- Line Friends
