= Anipang =

2009 video game

- Developer: SundayToz
- Producers: Jinho Kim, hyong ho park
- Designer: Designer Hozo (South Korean)
- Engine: SamSung Android OS
- Platforms: Android, iOS
- Release: September 2, 2009
- Genre: Puzzle

Anipang is a South Korean mobile puzzle game available through Cyworld Appstore and Naver Social Apps. Anipang is a social network game in which users compete with each other. It was developed by SundayToz. Service began on 11 October 2012, and within 74 days, the game had been downloaded more than 20 million times, making it the first South Korean game to achieve that milestone. On the strength of popularity, Sunday Toz has released a sequel titled "Anipang 2". This game is under consideration for entering the North American market.

== Cause of popularity ==
The first aspect is that this game is a short-term game, with sessions lasting one minute. Therefore, this game is good for passing the time when commuting or going outside to subways or bus stations. The second aspect relates to social networking services. This game is based on the Kakao Talk system, so users can send messages to their friends related on kakaotalk friends. Also, Anipang's structure is simple and middle-aged people prefer to play this game.

== Development and release ==
Anipang was developed by SundayToz. It was created for iOS and Android with a social feature support for KakaoTalk. It was released in September 2009.

== Reception ==
This game was released in 2011 and became popular in South Korea mobile market, because Anipang is the first mobile game based on a social networking system in that market. There were over 5,000,000 users in 2011, and more people took part in and enjoyed this game after years. There are now over 20,000,000 users, the highest number of users in the mobile game market in South Korea. The stock price of the developer SundayToz has risen rapidly over the past three years. Sunday Toz has opened an Anipang pop-up store in a department store in South Korea. In 2015, Anipang 2 entered the overseas mobile market, reaching countries such as Japan and China. The community application 'Line' helped to spread Anipang.

== Sequels ==
The first sequel to the original Anipang, Anipang Sanghai, had a game structure based on the original Anipang. There were more than one million advance bookings for downloads of Anipang Sanghai prior to its release.

The second sequel to the original Anipang was Anipang Matgo. This game is based on a traditional Korean card game called hwatu matgo, while the design is similar to other Anipang games.

The third sequel to the original Anipang was Anipang: The Sichuan. This game is based on the program named Sichuan. Anipang: The Sichuan has a structure similar to the game of mahjong. and there are other problems because of the bug. This bug programme causes the high score to rise automatically.
