= NAVER Pay =

Naver Pay
- Developer: Naver Corporation
- Operating system: Android iOS
- Platform: Android and iOS devices
- License: Proprietary
- Website: pay.naver.com

NAVER Pay (Korean: 네이버페이) or Npay is a mobile payment service launched by Naver Corporation. It is Naver's second mobile payment service after Line Pay, which was launched by Naver's Japanese subsidiary, Line Corporation in 2014. Line introduced Line Pay worldwide on December 16, 2014. Naver Pay was launched on June 25, 2015 with support for 14 banks and 3 credit card companies as well as 53,000 member stores.

== Service ==
Naver Pay is Naver's second mobile payment service after Line Pay, which was launched by Naver's Japanese subsidiary, Line Corporation in 2014. Line introduced Line Pay worldwide on December 16, 2014. The service has since expanded to allow other features such as offline wire transfers when making purchases and ATM transactions like depositing and withdrawing money. Naver Pay was launched on June 25, 2015 with support for 14 banks and 3 credit card companies as well as 53,000 member stores. The service allows both mobile payment services through the app and online checkout for online shopping similar to PayPal.

== See also ==
- Kakao Pay
