= Kim Bong-soo =

Kim Bong-soo may refer to:

- Kim Bong-soo (tennis)
- Kim Bong-soo (footballer, born 1970)
- Kim Bong-soo (footballer, born 1999)

== See also ==
- Kim Bum-soo (disambiguation)
