= Map platforms in South Korea =

Map platforms have been operated by numerous domestic and foreign companies in South Korea. As of 2025, South Korean map services had limited language support, while available international options lacked features. Foreign map providers have been criticized in South Korea for their labeling choices.

== Domestic providers ==
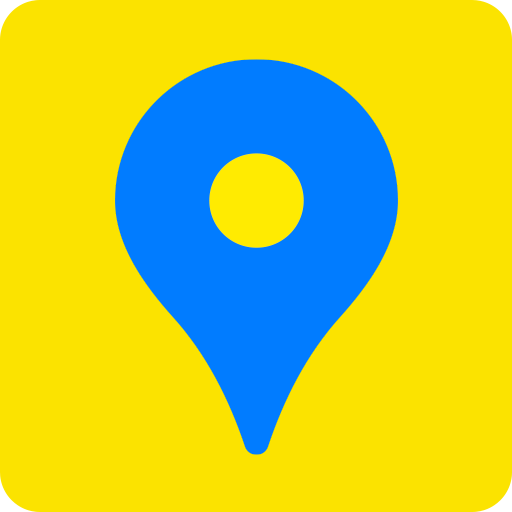
KakaoMap logo

Domestic providers of map applications include Kakao, Naver, and SK.

=== Kakao ===
KakaoMap provides navigation through Kakao Navi, which was launched in February 2016 through the acquisition of Kimgisa. Kakao Navi began supporting voice commands in October 2018. As of 2025, KakaoMap had partnered with Korea Airports Corporation to offer navigation inside major airports. As of 2026, KakaoMap was experimenting with a cherry blossom bloom timing map. In September 2026, the Korea Maritime Transportation Safety Authority announced the addition of coastal passenger ferry location tracking to KakaoMap.

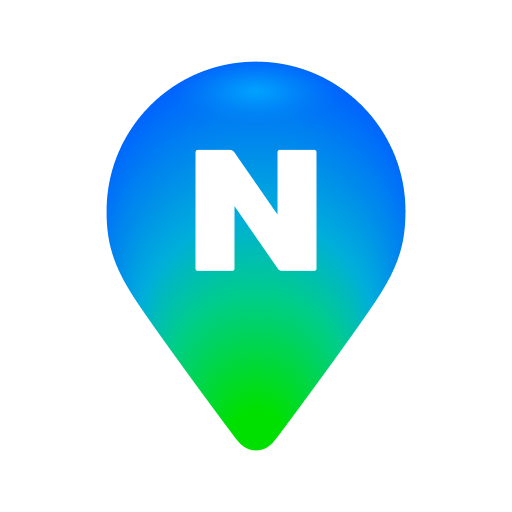
Naver Maps logo

=== Naver ===
Naver Maps added navigation features in December 2015. In December 2017, Naver linked its "Naver i" voice assistant to its map service. In September 2024, Naver Maps began providing real-time information on natural disasters from the Korea Meteorological Administration.

=== SK ===
TMAP became free to the public in 2016. In September 2017, Nugu voice assistant support was added to TMAP. As of 2024, BMW and Mercedes-Benz had decided to use TMAP in their future vehicles.

== Foreign providers ==
Foreign map applications in South Korea include Google Maps and Apple Maps.

Permission for Google and Apple to export detailed data has been delayed repeatedly based on national security regulations. As of 2025, Apple Maps provided walking navigation in South Korea without exporting official data. However, information on features such as crosswalks, stairs, and underpasses was missing.

Google and Apple have been criticized in the country for using alternative names to "Dokdo." In 2022, the Voluntary Agency Network of Korea pressured Apple into correcting its indication of the Heaven Lake border.

== Usage statistics ==
Domestic map app usage (millions)
App	Monthly active users
Naver Map	26.5
T Map	14.4
KakaoMap	10.6
Google Maps	8.8
As of February 2025
