= Nate (web portal) =

South Korean web portal

- Website type: Web portal, search engine
- Available in: Korean
- Owner: SK Communications
- Website: www.nate.com
- Commercial: Yes

Nate (Korean: 네이트) is a South Korean web portal developed by SK Communications. In 2003, Nate acquired social media site Cyworld and in 2004, it achieved first place in local page views with a total of 3.8 million, surpassing rival Daum for the first time.

== NateOn ==
NateOn is an instant messaging client provided by Nate, which in 2005 first overtook MSN Messenger in terms of South Korean user numbers. During the 3rd week of May 2005, NateOn's South Korean users totalled 7.54 million, compared to 6.5 million for MSN Messenger.

== See also ==
- Search engine
- Comparison of web search engines
- Timeline of web search engines
