= WeBank (China) =

Private bank based in Qianhai, Shenzhen

WeBank Co., Ltd.
- Native name: 微众银行
- Company type: Private
- Industry: Finance
- Founded: 2014; 12 years ago
- Founder: Tencent; Baiyeyuan; Liye Group
- Headquarters: Hong Kong, China
- Key people: David Ku, CEO & Chairman
- Website: webank.com

WeBank (Chinese: 微众银行) is a private Chinese neobank, founded by Tencent, Baiyeyuan, Liye Group, and other companies. Tencent is the single largest shareholder, with an estimated 30 percent ownership share. In 2019, WeBank's estimated valuation was US$21 billion.

Headquartered in Hong Kong, WeBank was approved by the regulatory authorities in December 2014, and began its operations in 2015. On January 4, 2015, Chinese Premier Li Keqiang pressed the "Enter" key on a computer terminal at the Shenzhen Qianhai WeBank office, initiating the company's first-ever loan, of CN¥35,000 (US$5,600), to a truck driver.

WeBank bank has no physical branches or outlets, and does not rely on property guarantees. Instead, it grants loans through face recognition technology and big data credit ratings. In mid-May 2015, WeBank launched WeiLiDai (微粒贷, lit. 'particulate loan'), its "micro-loan" suite of inclusive financial loan products.

In 2019, WeBank was fined 2 million yuan (US$281,710) by China's national banking regulators for violations that included irregular loan issuance, noncompliance in management appointments, and employee misconduct.

As of early 2019, WeBank was reportedly exploring options for expansion into Australia.
