= Tistory =

South Korean blog publishing service

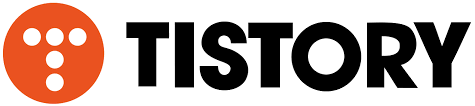
- Website type: Blog Host
- Available in: Korean
- Owner: AXZ Corp.
- Creators: Tatter and Company, Daum Communications
- Website: www.tistory.com
- Commercial: Yes
- Registration: Free
- Launched: May, 2006
- Current status: Active

Tistory is a South Korean blog-hosting service that allows private or multi-user blogs.

Tistory was first started by 'Tatter and Company', a blogging software development company that created the software 'Tattertools' with the partnership of Daum Communications, a major web portal in South Korea in 2006. In July 2007, ownership was transferred to Daum.

== Behind The Name ==
Tistory is a compound word consisting of T, the initial letter of Tattertools, and History. This name was created by the original founders, and is currently used to market the website in its logo, branding, and domain.

== Features ==
- Convenience: Tistory is a blogging platform using software called Tattertools. Tistory hosts users' blogs for free, and uses Tattertools' source code to host and run blogs. The website is intended for general users who do not know how to create a blog using traditional Web server hosting.
- Editing: Tistory uses WYSIWYG formatting, allowing users to easily navigate features such as posting, posting formatting, and theming, even if they do not know how to use HTML. Other popular blogging platforms such as Blogger, WordPress, and Tumblr also feature similar editors and formatting.
- Features: Tistory offers HTML editing, referrer logs, and visitor records, making it a popular choice over Naver or Daum hosted blogs for users who know how to write in HTML and CSS. Skins and plugins can be written and used on individual blogs, which were previously only provided by Tattertools. For performance and security reasons, plugins cannot be freely added/edited by users, and site administrators must approve and install them onto users' blogs.
- Invitation: For much of the service's lifetime, users had to join via an invitation system, where existing users were able to choose whom to invite, allowing them to create an account. Invitations were sent via email with a sign-up link. After signing up, new invitations were given out to users based on the performance of their posts, number of visitors, and number of comments. In the second half of 2018, this system was replaced and users were allowed to freely sign up after 12 years.
