= Kakao =

South Korean internet company

Kakao Corporation

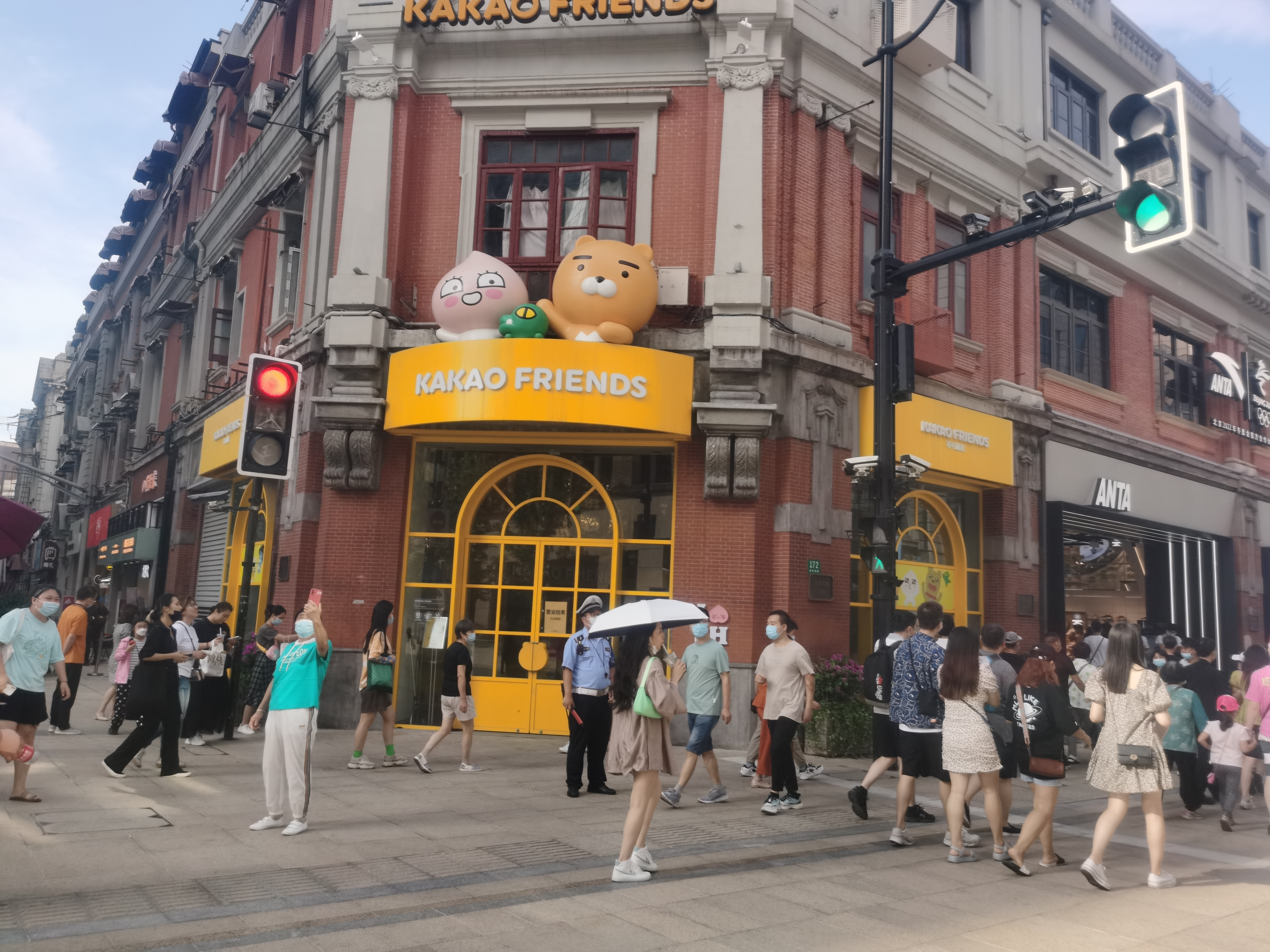
- Kakao Friends store at East Nanjing Road, Shanghai
- Native name: 주식회사 카카오
- Type: Public
- Traded as: KRX: 035720
- Industry: Internet
- Founded: 16 February 1995; 31 years ago (Note: Original company; as Kakao Inc.); 1 October 2014; 12 years ago (Note: Current incarnation)
- Founder: Brian Kim
- Headquarters: Jeju City, South Korea
- Area served: Worldwide
- Key people: Ham Choon-seung (Chairman); Chung Shina (CEO) (Note: Also serves as chair of the CA Consultative Body.); Shin Jong-hwan (CFO); Jung Kyu-don (CTO); Hong Min-taek (CPO)
- Products: KakaoTalk; Daum
- Revenue: ▲ ₩8.1 trillion (US$6.04 billion) (2025)
- Net income: ▲ ₩518 billion (US$386.49 million) (2025)
- Total assets: ▲ ₩27.78 trillion (US$20.73 billion) (2025)
- Total equity: ▲ ₩15.23 trillion (US$11.36 billion) (2025)
- Owner: Brian Kim (13.28%); K Cube Holdings (10.45%); National Pension Service (6.59%); Maximo Pte. Ltd. (5.97%); Others (63.71%)
- Number of employees: 3,992 (2025)
- Subsidiaries: Kakao Entertainment; Kakao Games; Kakao Friends; Kakao Mobility
- Website: www.kakaocorp.com

Kakao Corporation (Korean: 카카오) is a South Korean internet conglomerate headquartered in Jeju City. It was formed through the merger of Daum Communications and the original Kakao Inc. in 2010. The company was renamed Daum Kakao in 2014. In 2015, it was rebranded once more, reverting simply to Kakao.

The KakaoTalk messaging app dominates in South Korea, and after launching in March 2010, the service gained around 90% of domestic market share in 2015.

== History ==
=== 2006–2014: Founding of Kakao Corp. ===
Kakao Corp is the company behind KakaoTalk, which serves as its main platform and flagship application. It was founded in 2006 by Kim Bum-soo, the former CEO of NHN Corporation (the organization that emerged from the Hangame and Naver.com merger) as Kakao Inc.

In August 2013, three of the globally ranked top 10 Android games (according to analytics provider App Annie) were tied into the KakaoTalk platform—Everybody's Marble, Cookie Run, and Anipang. With 93 percent of South Korea's users on KakaoTalk, the free downloads of the games Ani Pang and Dragon Flight, which can only be played with a Kakao Talk account, were deemed "national" games. To maintain simplicity across all the provided services, Kakao applications can be purchased and logged in with links to KakaoTalk. Kakao Corp generated revenue of approximately $200M (USD) in 2013 through gaming, digital content, mobile commerce, and its marketing channels for brands and celebrities. Kakao Corp. was named a Top Developer on Google's Android Market, and KakaoTalk was chosen as the number one Free SMS App by Cnet.

According to a December 2013 App Annie report, Kakao was the world's third top publisher by monthly revenue at Google Play. Kakao Corp. was the number one publisher for iOS and Google Play in South Korea, and KakaoTalk was the number one app for iOS and Google Play revenue in South Korea. KakaoTalk was nominated for the Most Innovative Mobile App Award at the Global Mobile Awards 2014.

=== 2014–2019: Expansion and diversification ===
On 26 May 2014, Kakao Corp. announced that it had decided to merge with Daum Communications, one of Korea's top Internet portals, through a stock swap market capitalization.

Daum Kakao wordmark

On 10 March 2015, Daum Kakao launched its KakaoTaxi service, which allows users to call a taxi using the KakaoTaxi application. About 600,000 ride requests were made on the ride-hailing platform every day within eight months of its launch. In 2015, the company changed its name to Kakao, restoring its pre-merger name. Due to gambling and censorship issues within the Kakao ecosystem, the organization's board of directors ejected Kim-beom-soo as CEO and decided to replace him with Rim Ji-hoon. Kim Beom-soo became the largest shareholder in the new pro forma company with a 22.2 percent stake.

In January 2016, Kakao acquired a 76.4% stake in LOEN Entertainment, a large South Korean entertainment company, for $1.5 billion; it was later rebranded to Kakao M. In April 2017, Kakao Pay was spun off from Kakao.

Kakao was approved by South Korean regulators to become the nation's first internet-only bank in 2017. The internet bank engages in the same business as commercial banks, including processing deposits, loans and wiring money. Consumers no longer need to visit a bank to open a new bank account or to get a loan. Kakao's business plan was considered innovative, and the company's business model was expected to secure sizable customer sign-ups relatively easily from KakaoTalk's users.

Although K Bank eventually became South Korea's first Internet-only bank, having launched several months prior, Kakao Bank immediately attracted more customers; 820,000 within four days of launch on 27 July 2017. The dedicated Kakao Bank app itself was downloaded 1.5 million times within the same period. The bank had 3.5 million customers after a month. These figures trounced the 400,000 users that K-Bank amassed within 100 days of its existence.

By 26 September 2017, Kakao Bank lent ₩1.4 trillion ($1.2 billion), constituting 40 percent of the total loans in all of South Korea for that particular month. The bank's unprecedented expansion is seen as an exception to the closure of banks, particularly foreign-owned institutions. The fledgling performance of these banks is being blamed on the high cost of maintaining brick-and-mortar operations and the popularity of internet finance among Korean consumers.

In 2017, KakaoTaxi was renamed to Kakao T. The service includes the premium extension Kakao Taxi Black, which allows users to book rides in Seoul via the messenger app, exclusively carried in cars from luxury brands such as Mercedes Benz, Lexus, and BMW. Fares for the premium service started at ₩8,000. Kakao announced plans to expand the offering to other Korean cities within the following year. In November 2017, Kakao launched the Kakao Mini smart speaker, featuring integrated KakaoTalk functionality. In March 2018, Rim Ji-hoon stepped down and was replaced by vice presidents Yeo Min-soo and Joh Su-yong as co-CEOs. Kakao announced in April 2019 that they would be launching an e-bike sharing service with an initial fleet of 400 bikes across two major cities.

=== 2020-present: Entertainment consolidation, reorganization, and proposed split ===
In 2020, Kakao was expected to see improved performance due to rising demand for social IT infrastructure and internet-based services that could be used easily from home. This included acquiring a major stake as the largest shareholder in KakaoBank and launching advertising on KakaoTalk. As a result, the company recorded its highest-ever first-quarter revenue and operating profit since its founding. On 23 May 2020, its stock reached a 52-week high, and Kakao surpassed Hyundai Motor to become the 10th largest company by market capitalization on the KOSPI.

In March 2021, Kakao Page and Kakao M merged into Kakao Entertainment. In January 2022, Nam Koong-whon was named CEO. In July, Hong Eun-taek was appointed co-CEO, causing controversy internally due to his past behavior towards coworkers. In October, co-CEO Namkoong Whon resigned after a service outage caused by a data center fire.

In February 2023, Kakao acquired a 9.05% stake in SM Entertainment, becoming its second largest shareholder. In March, Hybe sold its shares of SM to Kakao. In the aftermath, the Financial Supervisory Service raided Kakao's offices on suspicion of stock manipulation based on allegations from Hybe. In March 2024, Hong Eun-taek stepped down and Chung Shin-a was appointed CEO. In May, the Fair Trade Commission approved the SM stake acquisition on the condition of two corrective measures.

In December 2025, Daum was split off from Kakao under its subsidiary AXZ. In 2026, LAAA Investment acquired part of Kakao's stake in Kakao Games, becoming its largest shareholder. In June, unionized Kakao workers staged their first strike ever over performance-related pay.

In August 2026, Kakao announced plans to split into two separately listed companies, Kakao AI and Kakao X, effective 1 January 2027, subject to shareholder approval. Kakao AI would focus on KakaoTalk, artificial intelligence, advertising and commerce, while Kakao X would oversee the group's fintech, content, mobility and investment businesses. Existing shareholders would receive shares in both companies under a proposed 36:64 split based on net book value.

The restructuring has received mixed assessments from analysts. Supporters argued that separating the businesses could simplify decision-making and capital allocation, while critics questioned whether the split would address Kakao's challenges in artificial intelligence and raised concerns over the allocation of certain businesses between the two companies.

Kakao also proposed merging its wholly owned subsidiary Kakao Investment into Kakao X. Shareholders representing approximately 2% of Kakao's outstanding shares objected to the merger, below the 20% threshold required to block the small-scale merger, allowing it to proceed without a separate shareholder vote. The merger is intended to provide Kakao X with additional investment resources after approximately ₩2.3 trillion (US$1.72 billion) in cash held by the existing Kakao is allocated to Kakao AI The broader split is scheduled for a shareholder vote on 17 December 2026, with the reorganisation planned for 1 January 2027 if approved.

On October 27, it was reported that the company was considering transferring its 21.61% stake in SM Entertainment to its subsidiary Kakao Entertainment as part of a broader restructuring of its entertainment business. Kakao Entertainment already holds a 19.89% stake in SM, which would bring its combined ownership to approximately 41.5% if the transaction proceeds.

== KakaoGroup companies ==
As of 2026, the KakaoGroup consists of:

- Kakao
- Kakao Pay: payments, money transfer, insurance, and investment
- KakaoBank: bank
- Kakao Mobility: "driver, navigation, e-bike, parking, car maintenance, and express delivery"
- KakaoStyle: personalized style recommendations
- Kakao Entertainment: webtoons, web novels, music, TV series, films, performances
- Kakao Games: game development, game publishing, VR·AR infused content
- Kakao piccoma: manga, novel content service platform
- Kakao Enterprise: cloud services
- Kakao Healthcare: digital healthcare technologies and services
- Kakao Ventures
  - Watcha, Lunit, Standigm, Karrot (Daangn Market), Korea Credit Data, Dunamu, TimeTree
- Kakao Investment: start-up investment company
- Linkagelab: subsidiary

== Other products and services ==
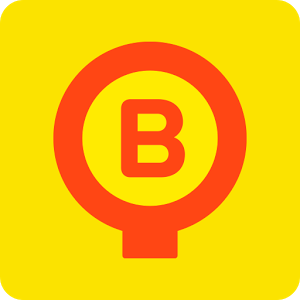
Kakao Bus logo

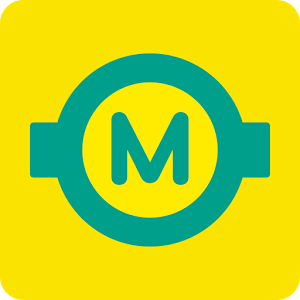
Kakao Metro logo

- KakaoBus: real-time location and traffic information on buses.
- KakaoMetro: metro line app, allows users to view the metro map, plan trips, and check prices.
- KakaoStory: image, video, and music sharing service
- KakaoPage: web-based comic and novel service
- Brunch: mobile contents publishing service
- KakaoMusic: music app with sharing features
- Melon: music streaming service acquired through Kakao M
- PotPlayer: media player for Windows
- KakaoHairshop: service, finding a nearby beauty salon
- Klaytn: consumer blockchain platform for mobile payments (via its subsidiary Ground X)
- KakaoFriends: diverse products including finance, distribution, foods, and so on
- KakaoHello: Call app service based on Kakao account. Service ended on 2016.
- KakaoTV: integrates Kakao TV Live broadcasting with KakaoTalk's open chatting
- KakaoHome: service, managing Smartphone home display
- KakaoPlace: service, sharing famous places
- KakaoAlbum: sharing pictures with Kakao friends
- KakaoMap: map showing mostly South Korea
- Kanana: generative AI chatbot
- Tistory: Blog-hosting service that allows private or multi-user blogs.

== See also ==
- Search engine
- Comparison of search engines
- Timeline of web search engines
- Map platforms in South Korea
