= Egloos =

South Korean blog hosting website

이글루스
- Website type: Blog Host
- Available in: Korean
- Dissolved: 16 June 2023
- Owner: ZUM Internet
- Website: http://www.egloos.com/
- Commercial: Yes
- Registration: Free; Ended 13 March 2023
- Launched: 23 June 2003
- Current status: Dissolved

Egloos (Korean: 이글루스) was a South Korean blog host, established in 2003. Its owner, SK Communications, claimed it to be a professional publishing system. The ISP acquired the service in 2006.

The name "Egloo" is derived from the word "igloo" and represented a personal online home for its users' lives.

Egloos's service ended on 16 June 2023, causing the website to dissolve. Following Egloos's dissolution, the website created a backup period for its users. This allowed them to download their posts, attached images, and files from the website before they were permanently deleted from Egloos's servers. The backup period lasted from 16 June 2023 to 18 December 2023.

== Users ==
The site was reported to have around 1 million users, but lost users to foreign blogging sites in 2009 due to concerns regarding the South Korean government's monitoring of its citizens' web-browsing behavior.

The Korea Times also stated this in their news article:

"Since April 1 (2009), the government mandated Internet users to make verifiable real-name registrations on all Web sites with more than 100,000 daily visitors, which means they have to submit their resident registration codes, the Korean equivalent of social security numbers."

Egloos' users were often Koreans with intensive IT-related interests. Korean users with interests in anime and manga were also featured throughout the website as well.

== Valley system ==
Egloos used a unique, theme-based system called "valley", whereby bloggers can choose to adopt and publish their blog postings under pre-existing themes (valleys). Valleys can also be created by user demand. In 2012, Egloos hosted 29 valleys.

- Book Valley (light novels)
- Animation Valley (Anime)
- News criticism
- Egloos Valley
- Movie Valley
- History Valley
- World Valley
- Comic Valley (manga, manhwa, and American comics)

== Censorship ==
The Blog allowed censorship of the posting censored by the site administrator under certain circumstances. However, Egloos users had complained about the fairness of the censoring process, as site administrators had been able to censor content based upon a request from anyone reading the blogs.
