= Nate Communications =

Korean technology conglomerate

Nate Communications Corp.
- Logo used since 2025
- Native name: 네이트커뮤니케이션즈 주식회사
- Company type: Private
- Industry: Tech industry
- Founded: 1999 as Lycos Korea; 2002 as SK Communications
- Headquarters: Seoul, South Korea
- Area served: South Korea
- Brands: Lycos (former); Cyworld; Nate
- Services: Internet media
- Website: natecorp.com

Nate Communications Corporation (Korean: 네이트커뮤니케이션즈 주식회사) is a South Korean technology company that owns and operates popular web portal Nate. It offers Internet access and telecommunications services for residences and businesses. SK Communications was founded in 1999 as Lycos Korea, a 50-50 venture of Lycos of the United States and Mirae Corp. of South Korea. The firm was sold to SK Telecom in 2002 and changed its name to SK Communications. SK Telecom currently holds 85.9 percent of its shares. In 2025, the firm was acquired by Samkoo and was renamed Nate Communications.

== Overview ==
SK Communications was created when parent SK Telecom merged the recently acquired Lycos Korea with its cable Internet unit NetsGo in 2002. NetsGo is the developer of Nate, a popular web portal in the Korean market. Lycos Korea had trouble differentiating itself from competition. With no clear image to anchor its position in the Korean market, Lycos declined in popularity and was soon incorporated into the Nate portal. The Lycos domain name was shut down at midnight on December 27, 2002, typing its address (www.lycos.co.kr) directed visitors to Nate's homepage. In 2003, Nate acquired Cyworld, one of the leading social networking services in South Korea.
To gain ground in the heatedly contested search market, SK Communications acquired rival Empas for $82 million in October 2006. The deal also included acquiring Konan Technology, the exclusive provider of search technology to Empas. After its takeover, Empas continued to operate independently with complete autonomy over its management and workforce. However, in the aftermath of SK Communications' decision to incorporate Empas search services into its flagship Nate portal, the Empas domain name was shut down in 2008 and the brand ceased to exist soon after. To further integrate its services, SK took over professional blogging service Egloos in the same year.

== Acquisitions ==
- Cyworld
- Cymarket
- Egloos
- Empas
- Etoos
- SK i-media

== 2011 Data breach ==
In July 2011, SK Communications was hacked in one of the largest data breaches in South Korea's history. The attack, which is believed to have been conducted from Chinese IP addresses, had compromised SK Communication's update server as its reached out to its supplier for a routine check up, according to the analysis, effectively turning the company's security procedures into a vulnerability. Hackers used vulnerabilities in the system to gain access to the personal data and IDs of 35 million Nate and CyWorld social network users. The attack currently stands as 10th on DataLossDB's list of largest all-time breaches with 35 million people affected.
In February 2013 a Seoul court has ruled that SK Communications should pay KRW 200,000 ($185.48) in damages to each ID theft victim in a class action lawsuit against SK Communications filed by 2,737 ID theft victims. On the ruling court said,

SK Communications completely failed to notice the phased theft of personally identifiable information provided by 35 million Nate and Cyworld users. Besides, SK Communications' use of a general-purpose, easy-to-hack version of ALzip (from ESTsoft) made Cyworld more susceptible to hacking attempts. On top of that, the operator's employee left the computer on without logging out, therefore leaving Cyworld's security porous until the early hours of the morning.

Internet security firms ESTsoft and Symantec who provided security software to SK Communications were also named defendants in the case, however the court found that they were not liable for damages.

== See also ==
- Cyworld
- Daum
- Lycos
- Nate
