= Kim Beom-soo (businessman) =

South Korean businessman (born 1966)

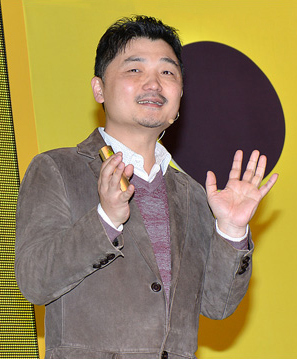
- Born: 8 March 1966 (age 60); Damyang County, South Korea
- Other name: Brian Kim
- Education: Seoul National University
- Alma mater: Bachelor's degree in engineering, Master's degree in engineering
- Known for: Founder of Hangame and Kakao
- Title: Chairman of Kakao
- Children: 2

Korean name
- Hangul: 김범수
- RR: Gim Beomsu
- MR: Kim Pŏmsu

Kim Beom-soo (Korean: 김범수; born March 8, 1966), also known as Brian Kim, is a South Korean billionaire businessman who is the founder and chairman of Kakao, a South Korean internet company. He is among the richest people in South Korea. As of August 2026, Forbes estimated his net worth as US$3.2 billion and ranked him 1,327th on its list of the world’s richest people.

== Early life and education ==
Kim was born in Damyang County and grew up in Seoul. He is the third of five children raised by his grandmother in a one-bedroom apartment as his parents focused on work. His father was a pen factory worker and his mother was a hotel maid with grade-school education. Kim grew up in poverty and funded his college education by working as a private tutor and sometimes skipped meals to save money.

He holds a bachelor's and master's degree in engineering from Seoul National University.

== Career ==
Kim's first job was as a developer for an online communication service at Samsung's IT services unit.

In 1998, Kim started Hangame with $184,000 he was given by friends and family. The company started as an internet café business but later became South Korea's first online gaming portal. He merged the company with web portal Naver in 2000 and later worked as a representative of NHN until 2007.

Kim moved to Silicon Valley, California in 2005 and created IWILAB, an incubator for Korean entrepreneurs in Mountain View, in 2006.

In 2010, he started KakaoTalk, which is South Korea's biggest messaging app and is installed on 90% of the country's smartphones. In the same year, Kim signed the Giving Pledge, committing to donate the majority of his wealth to philanthropy.

=== 2024 stock manipulation charges and arrest ===
On July 16, 2024, the Seoul Southern District prosecutors' office revealed that an arrest warrant was sought against Kim on stock manipulation charges which were related to price-rigging that took place in 2023 during a bidding war over SM Entertainment. On July 22, 2024, Kim made an appearance at the Seoul Southern District Court. Shortly after midnight on July 23, 2024, Kim was arrested. He was acquitted by the Seoul Southern District Court on October 21, 2025.

== Personal life ==
Kim lives in Seoul with his wife Mi-seon Hyeong and their 2 children.

In 2021, Kim signed the Giving Pledge, promising to donate more than 50% of his net worth to worthy social causes.

=== Gambling accusations ===
Kim was accused of gambling in Las Vegas from 2007 to 2010, which despite being overseas is illegal under South Korean law as he is a South Korean citizen. South Korean prosecutors reportedly obtained information from the U.S. Department of Justice and the Department of the Treasury that Kim had spent 20 hours and 51 minutes at the Bellagio Hotel in 2007 when he served as the CEO of NHN. According to the Hankook Ilbo, he bet an average of $2,440 per session and lost $16,993 during that time. NHN decided to comply with the prosecution's warrants requesting monitoring of chatting records, a reversal from its earlier stance.
