= Melon (online music service) =

South Korean online music service

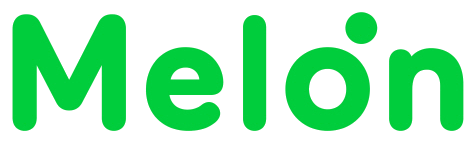

- Screenshot Screenshot of Melon's new interface, launched in August 2016
- Website type: OMS
- Available in: Korean
- Founded: November 16, 2004; 21 years ago
- Owner: Kakao Entertainment
- Creator: SK Telecom
- Website: www.melon.com
- Commercial: Yes
- Registration: Required, for South Koreans only
- Users: 4~5 million (in South Korea alone, as of 2018)
- Launched: November 16, 2004; 21 years ago

Melon (Korean: 멜론; RR: Mellon) is a South Korean online music store and music streaming service introduced in November 2004, and developed by SK Telecom. LOEN Entertainment (became Kakao M and then Kakao Entertainment) became the company-in-charge of the service in 2009. In 2017, Kakao merged Kakao Music into Melon to have one, unified music streaming service.

Melon is South Korea's largest music subscription service, with over 28 million users. Melon is the most popular music streaming service in South Korea. In fact, a survey of users of smartphones found that they were the most used applications by Koreans. Melon users can stream and download music and music videos and create custom ringtones. Melon is available on Android and iOS.

The name "Melon" is a portmanteau of the phrase "melody on".

== History ==
Melon was founded on November 16, 2004, in South Korea by SK Telecom, South Korea's largest wireless carrier. It attracted more than 10,000 subscribers per day on average, surpassing 310,000 on its first few months. In October 2008, SK Telecom transferred the majority of Melon's stock to its shareholder Loen Entertainment for approximately 24.3 billion KRW. In July 2013, SK Planet, a subsidiary of SK Telecom, sold 52.56% of its stake in Loen Entertainment to Star Invest Holdings Limited, a subsidiary of Affinity Equity Partners, a Hong Kong-based private equity firm. Later in January 2016, Kakao acquired a 76.4% stake in the company for 1.87 trillion won (approximately $1.64 billion). In 2018, Kakao M spun-off from Kakao, but Melon stayed.

In 2021, Melon merged with Kakao Entertainment and rebranded itself as "Melon M". This joint venture aimed to secure their leadership in the showbiz industry. Lee Jae-wook will lead the joint. At that time, the streaming platform boasted 33 million users and around 5 million paying users.

In the early 2020s, Melon faced growing competition from YouTube Music, which Google offered to South Korean users as part of its YouTube Premium subscription. In 2023, YouTube Music overtook Melon as the music streaming app with the most monthly active users in South Korea. Melon and other domestic platforms subsequently sought to differentiate themselves by offering experiences beyond simple playlists.

In January 2024, the Korea Fair Trade Commission fined Kakao 98 million won, finding that between 2017 and 2021 Melon had not adequately informed subscribers that they could cancel early and receive partial refund. Kakao challenged the decision in court, and in November 2025 the Supreme Court ruled that the fine was unjustified while upholding the commission's corrective order.

== International operations ==
In 2010, Melon was launched by SK Telecom in Indonesia, in partnership with Telkom Indonesia. In 2016, Telkom Indonesia bought all the stake formerly owned by SK Telecom following the SK Telecom's divestment from all Melon businesses, thus making Melon Indonesia an Indonesian company.

== Promotions ==
=== Music programs on TV ===
A screenshot of Red Velvet performing Russian Roulette on the SBS program Inkigayo on September 11, 2016, showing the introduction ticker for the song. The ticker shows the highlighting of Melon as a main sponsor for the said program. (from the official SBS Inkigayo YouTube account)

Melon is the main sponsor of the following music-related shows:

- Inkigayo (SBS, October 2010 – December 2016, re-sponsored since February 2017 - December 2023. Previously known as Popular Song and The Music Trend.)
- Show! Music Core (MBC, August 2014 – March 2018)
- Show Champion (MBC Music, January 2013 – May 2018)
- You Hee-yeol's Sketchbook (KBS 2TV)
- Immortal Songs: Singing the Legend (KBS 2TV) (February 2012 - 2021)
- K-pop Star (SBS, all six seasons from 2011 to 2017)
- Tribe of Hip Hop (JTBC)
- King of Mask Singer (MBC, since June 2017) (Note: Formerly sponsored by rival music service Bugs)
- MIXNINE (JTBC) (2017–2018)
- Music Bank (KBS 2TV, since January 2020)

=== Melon Music Awards ===
In 2009, LOEN Entertainment launched the Melon Music Awards (MMA), an award-giving body dedicated to calculating digital sales and online votes to judge the winners.

=== Global K-Chart ===
In June 2026, Melon has partnered with China's Tencent Music Entertainment Group and Japan's Line Music to launch Global K-Chart, which bring together it's comprehensive global chart with platform-specific charts across Melon, Tencent's QQ Music and Line Music. It combines music streaming data (streaming/downloads) with fan activity metrics that calculated daily.

== Achievements ==
=== Songs with the most weeks at number one ===
Weeks	Artist	Song	Year released	Ref.
15	Aespa	"Supernova"	2024	
15	Huntrix	"Golden"	2025	
14	NewJeans	"Ditto"	2022	
11	G-Dragon	"Home Sweet Home"	2024	
11	BTS	"Dynamite"	2020	
9	AKMU	"Love Lee"	2023	
8	Yoon Do-hyun	"I Guess I Loved You"	2005	
8	BigBang	"Last Farewell"	2007	
8	Girls' Generation	"Gee"	2009	
8	Zico	"Any Song"	2020	
8	Mirani, Munchman, Khundi Panda, Mushvenom feat. Justhis	"VVS"	2020	
8	Brave Girls	"Rollin'"	2017	

=== Longest charting songs on weekly chart ===
Weeks	Artist	Song	Current position
451	BTS	"Spring Day"	55
416	Paul Kim	"Every Day, Every Moment"	39
302	AKMU	"How Can I Love the Heartbreak, You're the One I Love"	13
272	Lim Young-woong	"Trust in Me"	–
254	Sung Si-kyung	"Every Moment Of You"	20
252	GyeongseoYeji & Jun Gun-ho	"If You Lovingly Call My Name"	62
239	Jannabi	"For lovers who hesitate"	44
237	BTS	"Dynamite"	–
236	Lim Young-Wong	"Love always runs away"	77
217	MeloMance	"Love, Maybe"	32
As of April 29, 2026

=== Most liked songs of all time ===
Likes	Artist	Song	Year released	Ref
512,625	BTS	"Spring Day"	2017	
488,691	AKMU	"How Can I Love the Heartbreak, You're the One I Love"	2019	
469,462	BTS	"Dynamite"	2020	
457,726	IU	"Through the Night"	2017	
449,929	Jannabi	"For Lovers Who Hesitate"	2019	
438,238	Paul Kim	"Every Day, Every Moment"	2018	
421,311	BTS ft. Halsey	"Boy With Luv"	2019	
416,275	Anne-Marie	"2002"	2018	
401,236	IU ft. Suga	"Eight"	2020	
376,231	DAY6	"You Were Beautiful"	2017	
As of October 26, 2025

=== Most streamed artists of all time ===
Streams (billions)	Artist	Ref
14.80	Lim Young-woong	
14.06	BTS	
8.95	IU	
8.65	Exo	
5.14	Seventeen	
4.95	Kim Ho-joong	
4.58	Plave	
3.89	Bolbbalgan4	
3.76	BigBang	
3.393	Davichi	
3.391	Taeyeon	
As of May 30, 2026

=== All-time records ===
- Most streamed artist: Lim Young-woong (14.8B streams)
- Most streamed song: BTS – "Spring Day" (1.084B streams)
- Most streamed album: Lim Young-woong - IM HERO (4.9B streams)
- Song with most unique listeners: BTS – "Spring Day" (9.1M ULs)
- Longest-running No 1 song on realtime chart: Huntrix, Ejae, Audrey Nuna, Rei Ami - "Golden (2398 hours)
- Longest-running No 1 song on daily chart: Huntrix, Ejae, Audrey Nuna, Rei Ami - " Golden" (102 days)
- Longest-running No 1 song on weekly chart: Aespa – "Supernova, Huntrix, Ejae, Audrey Nuna, Rei Ami - Golden (15 weeks)
- Longest-running No 1 song on monthly chart: Huntrix, Ejae, Audrey Nuna, Rei Ami - "Golden" (4 months)
- Longest-running Top 10 song on weekly chart: WOODZ – "Drowning" (80 weeks and counting) This is the first song to achieve this milestone in history.
- Longest-running Top 10 song on yearly chart: Paul Kim – "Every Day, Every Moment", BTS (feat. Halsey) – "Boy with Luv" (2 years)
- Longest-running Top 100 song on daily chart: BTS – "Spring Day
- Longest-running Top 100 song on weekly chart: BTS – "Spring Day" (446 weeks)
- Longest-running Top 100 song on yearly chart: BTS – "Spring Day" (9 years)
- Most roof-hit song: Zico – "Any Song" (51 roof-hits)
- Most unique listeners for a song in 1st 24 hours: IU – "BBIBBI" (1,462,625 ULs)

== Accolades ==
Melon, a leading music streaming service in South Korea, has achieved significant recognition over the years for its impact on the music industry and its innovative features. In 2011, it was honored as one of "Korea's Best 25 Apps" at the App Awards Korea, highlighting its popularity and user-friendly design.

Melon was recognized at the 2012 Trusted Brand Awards.

Melon won the "Grand Prize for Digital Contents" in the 2012 Korean Digital Management Innovation Awards.

Melon was recognized in the 2012 Korea Brand Power Index.

Ilgan Sports ranked Melon as the 3rd most influential entity in the K-pop industry in a November 2013 poll in celebration of its 44th anniversary.

== See also ==
- Naver VIBE
- SK Telecom
- Kakao M
- Apple Music
- Tidal
- iTunes
- Kakao Music
- Melon Music Awards
