= Kakao T =

Korean transportation service app

- Developer: Kakao
- Operating system: Android, iOS
- Available in: Korean
- Type: Transportation
- Website: kakaomobility.com

Kakao T (formerly KakaoTaxi) is a Korean transportation service app launched by Kakao Mobility Corp., a subsidiary of Kakao, in 2017. The service provides taxi-hailing, designated driver booking, nearby parking space searching, and real-time traffic information services.

The service was originally launched as Kakao Taxi on March 31, 2015, as taxi-calling service app to connect potential passengers to taxi drivers. In 2017, Kakao rebranded the platform as Kakao T, with the "T" standing for "transportation", and merging their key transportation services into one mobile app. The service was made available in Japan in May 2017 thanks to a partnership with JapanTaxi.

== Functionality ==
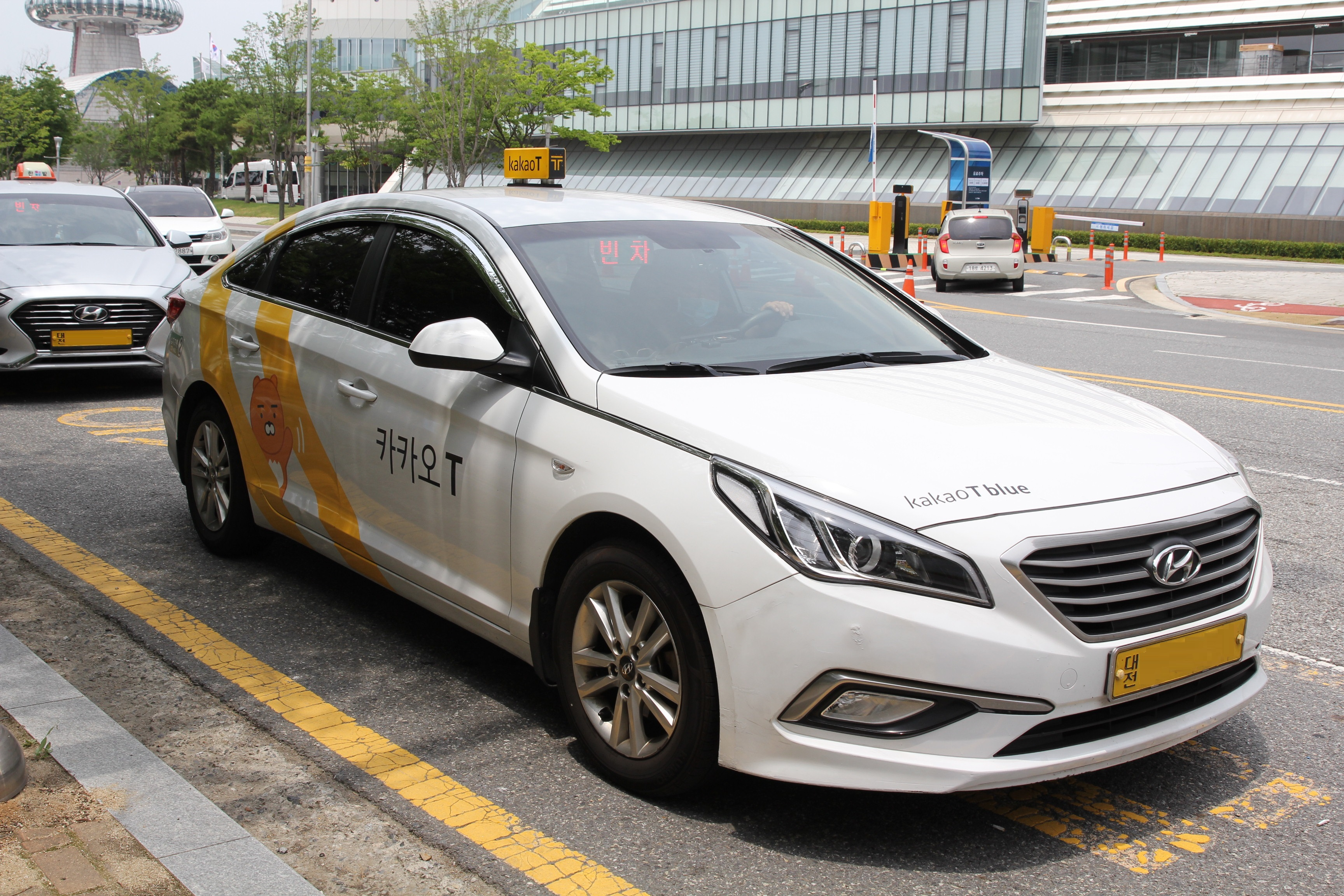
Kakao Taxi branded taxi cab in Daejeon, South Korea.

The app requires a Kakao account, which collects an email address and password. Additional personal information is collected and stored in accordance with Kakao's privacy policy. The app facilitates connecting users to a nearby driver in the surrounding area remotely. All KakaoTaxi drivers are licensed taxi operators.

== Privacy ==
Users who hail a taxi have their location shared with their designated driver. User information is hidden, and the driver can see only the user's pickup location. The app masks the user's phone number with a temporary virtual number to ensure privacy.

The app requests access to view files stored on the device, call history, and access to the user's contacts.

The passenger is shown the driver's photo, name, car model and license plate number. The app provides information of the trip time and estimated arrival. KakaoTaxi is compatible with Android and iOS.

== Payment ==
Users can pay their fare with cash, debit/credit card, or a Korean transportation card.
