= KakaoStory =

Social network platform

- Developer(s): Kakao
- Initial release: 22 March 2012
- Operating system: iOS, macOS, Android
- Available in: Korean
- Type: social network
- Website: www.kakao.com/story story.kakao.com

KakaoStory (Korean: 카카오스토리) is a social network platform launched by Kakao. It was launched on March 22, 2012 as a photo sharing network but has then expanded to include others features allowing users to post various things on their page. As of 2017, KakaoStory has more active users in South Korea than Facebook.
