= Daum (web portal) =

South Korean web portal

- Logo since 2026
- Website type: Web portal
- Available in: Korean
- Owners: Daum Co., Ltd.
- Website: daum.net
- Commercial: Yes
- Registration: Optional
- Users: 6.9 million (Mobile MAU)
- Launched: May 1997; 29 years ago
- Current status: Online

- Daum
- Hangul: 다음
- RR: Daeum
- MR: Taŭm

Daum (Korean: 다음) is a South Korean web portal. Daum was founded in 1995 and launched on December 20, 1995 by the company Daum Communications. It also offers a variety of services, including cloud storage (Daum Cloud), Daum Dictionary (for mobile devices), Daum Comics, and map service (Daum Maps).

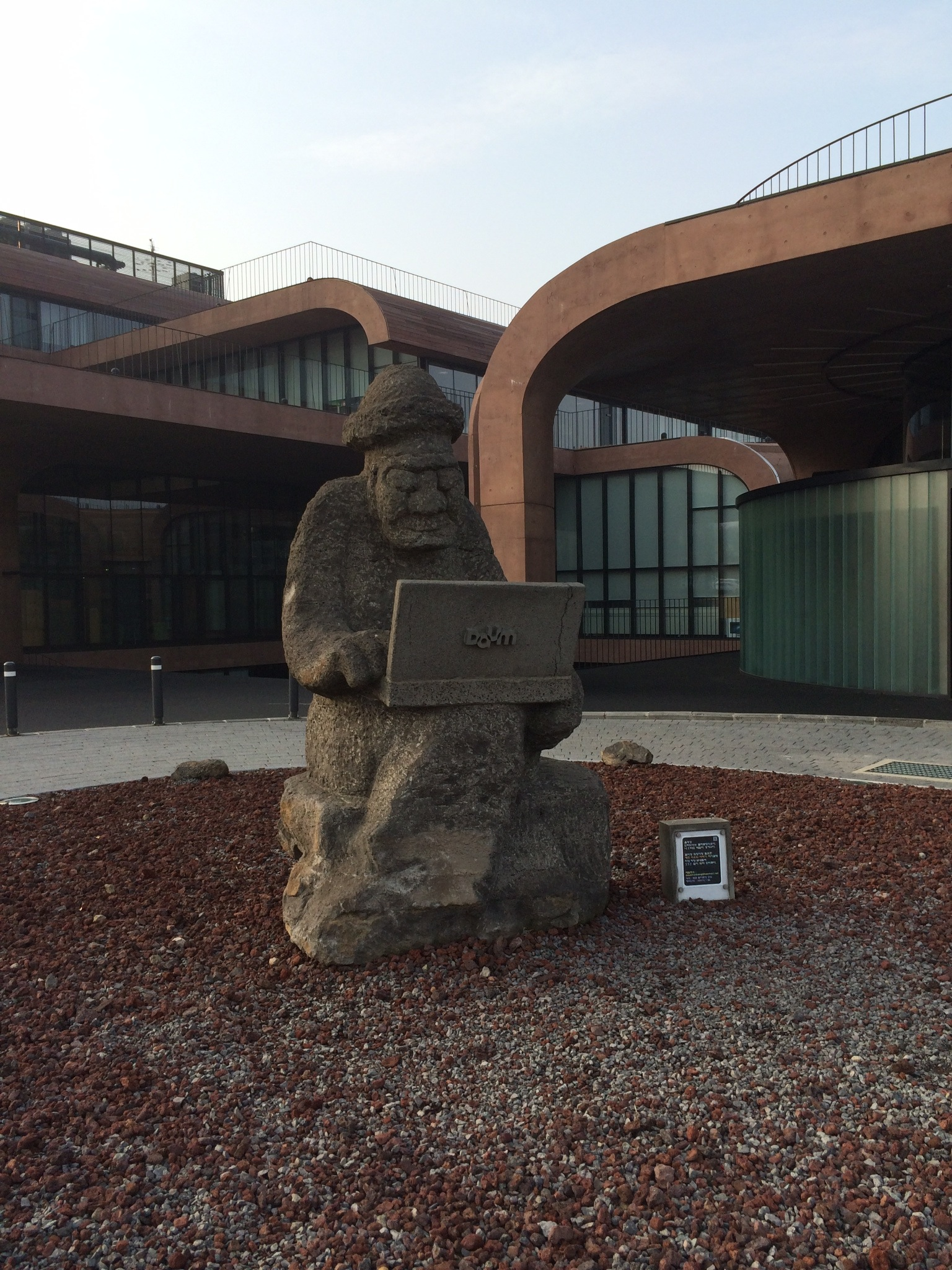
Statue in front of Daum Space.

Daum Kakao is the company behind the Kakao messaging service and Daum is a Korean web portal with many services.

== History ==
The former Daum Communications Corporation was founded in 1994 by Park Geon-hee and Lee Jae-woong, and the company launched the namesake portal in May 1997 making it the first South Korean web portal.

Daum offers various Internet services to web users, including a popular free web-based e-mail, messaging services, shopping, news services.

In 2006, they started a blogging service Tistory a blogging platform developing company.

Daum company also develops and distributes the freeware media player PotPlayer.

In addition to its freeware media player (Daum tvPot), Daum Communications Corp. provides a variety of services such as clouding service (Daum Cloud), Daum Dictionary (applicable on mobile devices), Daum Comics, and map service (Daum Maps).

Daum has about 874 employees as of March 2009, and was the 2nd largest web portal service provider in South Korea in terms of daily visits.

In 2014, Daum merged with Kakao Corp. (at that time known as Kakao Inc.), known as the maker of KakaoTalk, to form Daum Kakao.

== Logos ==
1995–2000

2000–2010

2010–2013

2013–2025

2025–2026

2026– (current)

== Service ==
=== Daum Mail ===
The popularity of Daum stems from the range of services it offers, but also from the fact that it was the first Korean web portal of significant size. Daum popularity started when it merged with the then most popular e-mail service, daum.net or hanmail.net.

=== Daum Cafe ===
After the merging, Daum started the forum service Daum Cafe which brought it firm status in the market. Daum received the eighth-highest trust rating in a 2020 Reuters Institute survey of selected South Korean media outlets.

== See also ==
- Search engine
- Timeline of web search engines
- Comparison of web search engines
- Tistory
