= Kim Bum-soo (footballer, born 1968) =

South Korean footballer and coach

Kim Bum-Soo
Personal information
- Full name: Kim Bum-Soo
- Date of birth: 29 August 1968 (age 58)
- Place of birth: South Korea
- Position: Goalkeeper

Youth career
- Iri High School

Senior career*
Years	Team	Apps	(Gls)
1987–1988	Korea National Railroad		
1989–1991	Daewoo Royals		

Managerial career
- 2004: South Korea U-17 (GK coach)
- 2006: South Korea U-17 (GK coach)
- 2008: FC Seoul Academy (GK coach)
- 2010: Korea University (GK coach)
- 2011: Police FC (Assistant coach)
- 2012: Gangwon FC (GK coach)
- * Club domestic league appearances and goals

Kim Bum-Soo (Korean: 김범수; born 29 August 1968) is a retired South Korean footballer and football goalkeeper coach.

He worked Korea Football Association as full-time goalkeeper coach for youth team from 2003 to 2006.
