= Personal media =

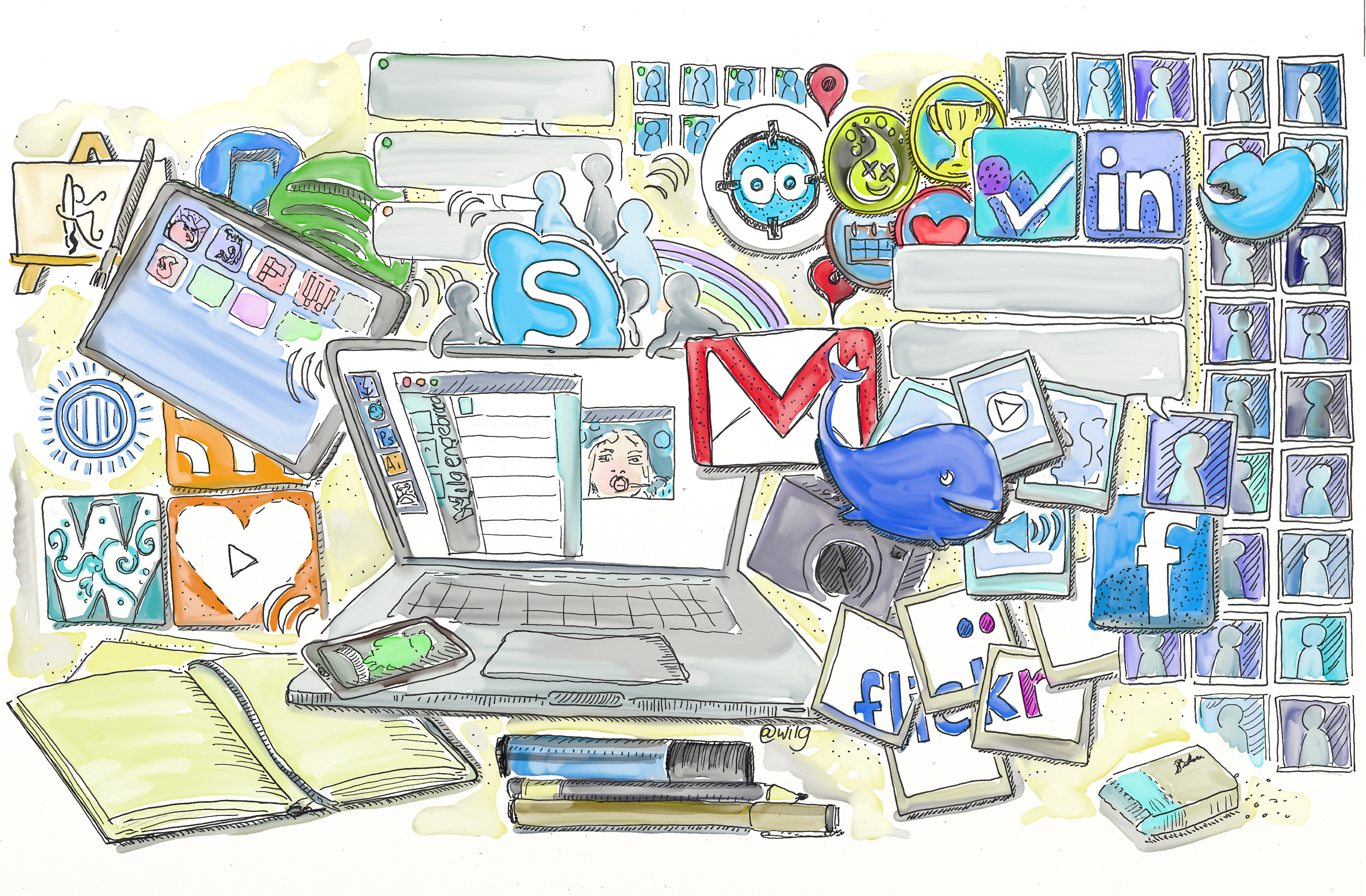
Examples of personal media

Personal media are media of communication which are used by an individual rather than by a corporation or institution. They are generally contrasted with mass media which are produced by teams of people and broadcast to a general population. In other words, personal media allow individuals, as opposed to corporate entities, to contribute knowledge and opinion to the public. The term dates from the 1980s.

New technologies such as social media and self-publishing are creating a variety of modes for modern media. Marika Lüders suggests a two-dimensional model for classifying such media with one dimension being the degree of interaction between the senders and receivers; and the other dimension being the level of institutionalisation and professionalism.

Katherine Nashleanas links the concept of personal media to the notion of 'control' by an individual as opposed to a centralised authority. She argues that although personal media including the fax have been available to the general public since the 1960s, more recent technologies such as the smartphone confer greater control over content production and distribution to their users.
