= Cyworld =

South Korean social network service

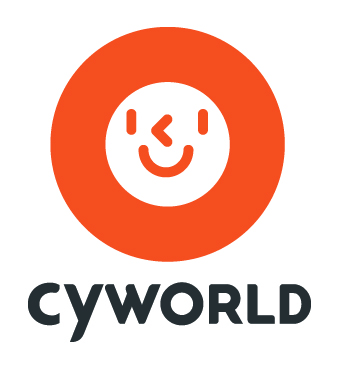
- Website type: Social network service
- Available in: Korean, Chinese, English, German, Japanese, Spanish, Vietnamese
- Owner: CyworldZ
- Website: cyworld.com (Korea)

Cyworld
- Stable release: iOS 8.7.3 (May 2, 2019; 7 years ago) Android 8.7.2 (April 10, 2019; 7 years ago) [±]
- Operating system: iOS, Android
- Website: cyworld.com

Cyworld (Korean: 싸이월드) is a South Korean social network service. Cyworld was originally part of SK communication, and became an independent company in 2014. Members cultivate relationships by forming Ilchon (Korean: 일촌, Hanja: 一寸) or "friendships" with each other through their minihompy. Avatars and "mini-rooms" (small, decoratable, apartment-like spaces in an isometric projection) are features of the service, which can make for a Sims-like experience.

The "Cy" in Cyworld can mean "cyber", but is also a pun on the Korean word for "relationship" (Korean: 사이 'between').

Cyworld is a rough equivalent to Myspace of the United States, with the main difference being that revenue is generated through the sale of dotori (Korean: 도토리), or acorns, which can be used to purchase virtual goods, such as background music, pixelated furniture, and virtual appliances.

Cyworld also has operations in China and Vietnam.

== History ==
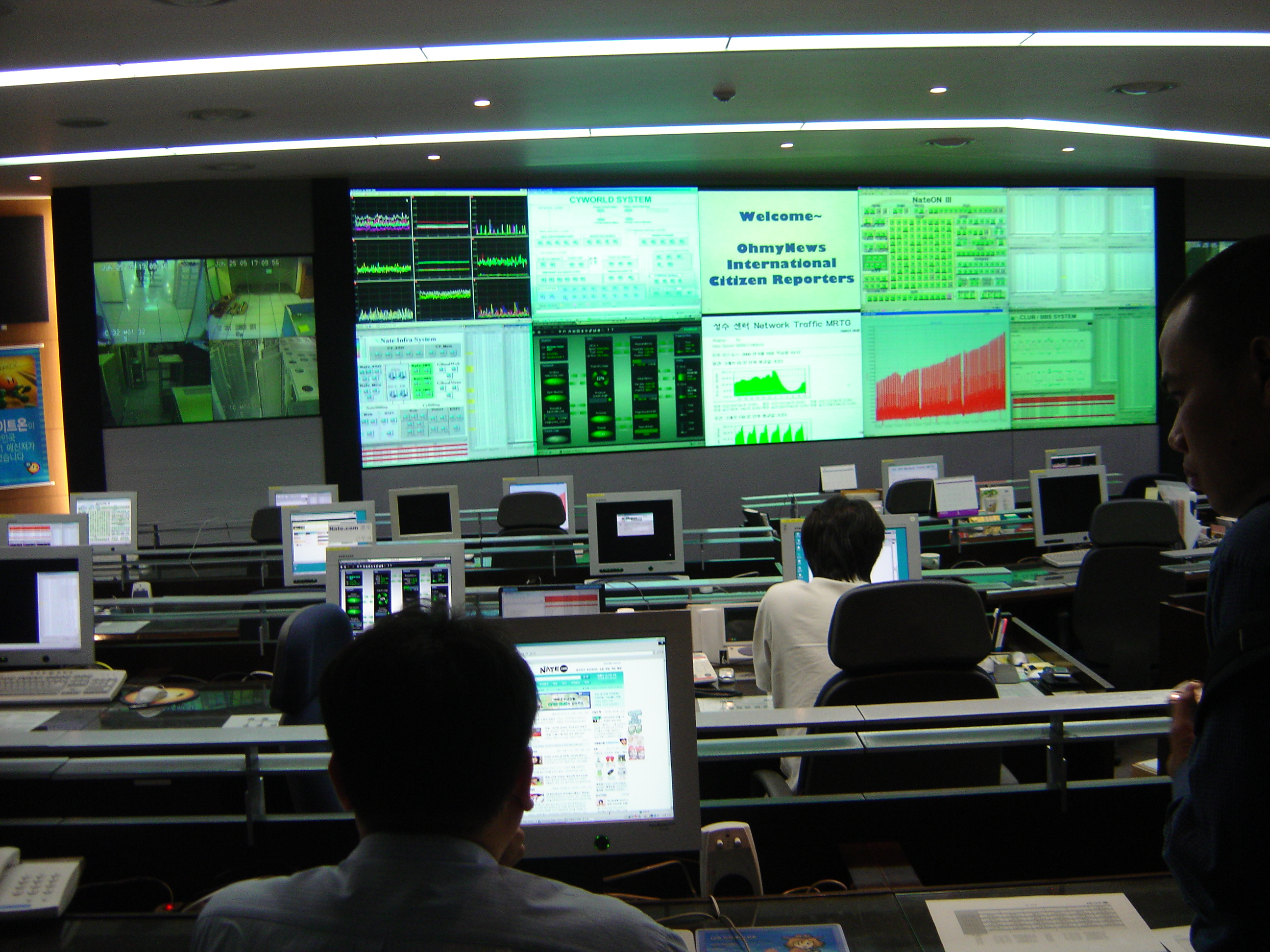
Cyworld control room in Seoul, Korea. Operation of the site is monitored here by the staff of SK Communications.

=== Overview ===
Cyworld launched in 1999 and was purchased by SK Communications in 2003. It became one of the first companies to profit from the sale of virtual goods.

Cyworld was wildly popular in its home market, with 2005 claims that nearly every South Korean in their twenties and 25 percent of the South Korean population were users. By 2006 its domestic user base numbered 19 million, but this dropped to 18 million by 2008.

Cyworld's reception in some overseas markets did not prove as enthusiastic, and by 2010 Cyworld had ended its operations in Germany, Japan, and the United States. As of 2009, it continues to provide service to the Chinese and Vietnamese markets where it has subscriber bases of seven million and 450,000, respectively.

=== Initial stages ===
The idea for Cyworld started in August 1999 by KAIST student organization the 'EC club', a club that took on online business projects. The club members got the idea to create a social networking website while discussing topics for a research project. Though most club members abandoned the project after graduation, Dong-Hyung Lee continued to pursue the project, taking on the role of CEO from December 1999.

The word 'cy' is a Korean word meaning 'between people', underlining the networking aspect of the website and connoting a close relation between the website users. However, most misinterpret 'cy' as an abbreviation for 'cyber' due to its fortis; 'sai' corresponds to a more accurate pronunciation of a Korean word for 'between.' The original nature of the term 'cy' demonstrates Dong-Hyung Lee's vision for the site. He wanted to create an Internet community that allowed people to form close relationships, rather than a community where people merely sought information for business prospects.

Cyworld in its early stages was quite different from what it is today. It was a website that showed a list of members from the same hometown or school. The address book for each member was updated automatically according to the personal information its members provided. It was not a place where people could express themselves, but rather a website that allowed people to gain means of contact, so that members could meet offline. Cyworld at its early stages was far from successful, once running a deficit of 1.5 billion won.

=== Minihomepy ===
In the summer of 2002, Cyworld launched the "minihomepy" project, a last chance to turn things around before the business had to shut down. CEO Dong-Hyung Lee put contents provider Ram Lee in charge of the project. It was an instant success.

Offering many methods of expressing oneself, the minihomepy had features such as a main picture, history, user profile, photo story, story room, background music, photo album, diary, bulletin board, video clips, and decorating links. Another component of the minihomepy was the miniroom, a decorative online room furnished with virtual furniture.

One of the main reasons for minihomepy's success was people's dissatisfaction with the "individual homepages" that were prevalent in Korea at the time. While individual homepages were initially widely popular because they enabled people to express themselves online, the programming knowledge (e.g. HTML, FTP) required to create an individual homepage was too daunting for most people. Although knowledge barrier was partially resolved through homepage programming services such as High Home(하이홈), there still remained a significant issue: the means of communication between individual homepage users was absent. Individual homepages were like "stranded islands" in the vast sea called the Internet. Minihomepy addressed the desire for interpersonal communication. Minihomepies were easy to create and maintain. Minihomepies had components like visitor logs and comments, which provided a means of contact, while features such as the diary and bulletin boards allowed for individual expression; it was amicably received by the public. Members had to become Ilchons in order to gain access to each other's minihomepies.

The minihomepy service was officially launched on 9 September 2002. Cyworld uses its own form of cybermoney, called dotori (acorns). The items for decorating the minihomepies and minirooms could be bought with dotoris, and people voluntarily spent money on dotori as their minihomepy decoration was perceived as another expression of themselves.

Cyworld gained further success when in November 2002, its competitor Freechal (another networking site for online communities) decided to charge its users 3,000 won per month. Freechal also announced plans to shut down communities operated by those who failed to pay the fee. This "pay-or-shut-down" policy prompted a horde of members to cancel their subscriptions and move to other free online community hosts, including Cyworld.

=== Merger with SK Telecom ===
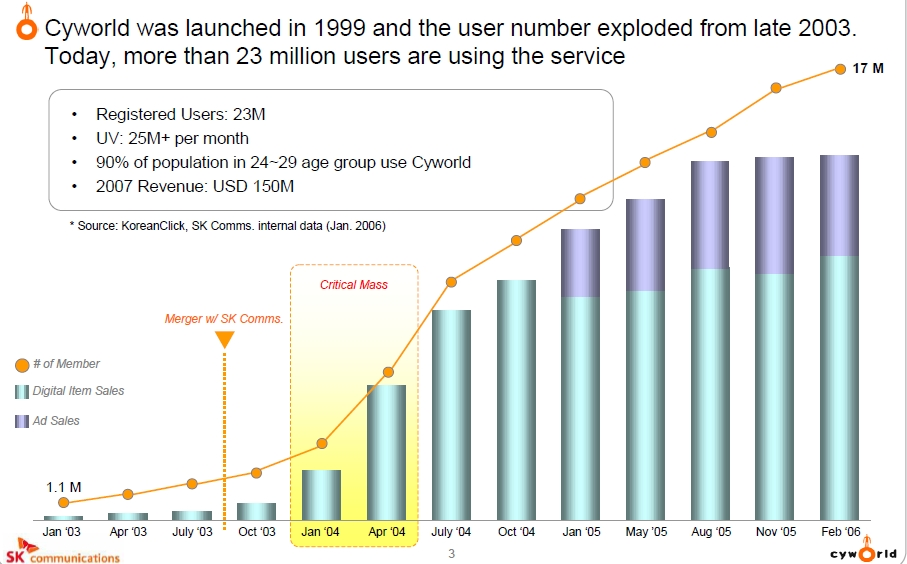
Graph showing Cyworld's dramatically increasing subscriber base

In August 2003, Cyworld merged with SK Telecom, a Korean communication company and owner of the domain Nate. The rapidly increasing number of subscribers was getting too difficult for Cyworld to manage on its own, and SK promised resources for further growth in the market. Although it was incorporated into the SK community department, Cyworld retained its brand name, service, and independence. The CEO of Cyworld Dong-Hyung Lee was appointed as the general manager of the Cyworld department, and he moved on to be the CEO of Cyworld Japan in May 2005 until he left the company in December 2008 to pursue other business adventures.

The merger immediately led to significant market success. By the end of 2003, Cyworld gave rise to the terms "cyholic" (a Cyworld addict) and "cyjil" (jil is a Korean pun for action, so cyjil means doing Cyworld-related activities). Cyworld became a sensation among the Korean public, more than tripling in monthly visitors (from 2 million to 7 million) from early 2003 to November 2003.

Cyworld's success grew even further when it began to collaborate with Nate-on, the largest online messenger service in Korea and also owned by SK. The collaboration was established in 2005, allowing Cyworld and Nate-on members to use both services simultaneously by logging into just one site.

In early 2007, Cyworld topped 20 million members for its services (roughly half the population of South Korea) giving rise to the term 'sa-chon era', meaning any two Cyworld members are likely to be Cyworld ilchons through fewer than four connections. In 2009, Cyworld unified its domain with SK's Nate. This move was meant for "user convenience", as the two domains had over 17 million overlapping members. No significant change was made to the site after the union. As of 2011, Cyworld had over 25 million members.

=== 2011 data leakage and decline ===
As Facebook began its services in Korea in 2009, Cyworld slowly began to lose its status as the only popular SNS service in Korea. According to some research, Facebook's simpler design and function were more appealing and easier to use than Cyworld. As Cyworld did not offer global services, it was an undesirable service for people who wanted to contact friends around the world. The introduction of smartphones to the market was also a key factor in Cyworld's decline, as both Facebook and Twitter offered stronger interconnectivity with mobile platforms. Kakao Story, an SMS service exclusive for smartphone users, had an advantage over its rivals due to its connection with mobile service KakaoTalk(카카오톡), which has over 55 million members. Cyworld's inability to keep up with the trend made it fall behind in the market.

Cyworld's declining market share was further aggravated by a 2011 data leakage. In July 2011, Cyworld/Nate was hacked into by criminals who stole the personal information of more than 35 million users. (Nate had 33 million users and Cyworld had 25 million, and combined, they had about 35 million members.) The information for almost all of the Cyworld/Nate members, and by extension about 70 percent of the Korean population, was compromised. The hackers accessed Cyworld's system by using an Internet protocol address based in China. Because Cyworld/Nate requires its members to submit personal information for membership, the 2011 data leakage was quite detrimental as the hackers had the members' resident registration numbers, phone numbers, and email addresses. Though SK communications insisted that the resident registration numbers and passwords were encrypted and are not likely to be abused even in the hands of the hackers, nobody gave the company the benefit of the doubt.

SK Telecom took measures trying to minimize the harm, but it was soon flooded with lawsuits demanding compensation for the leakage. The leakage yielded costly lawsuits for the company, in a country with virtually no precedent in class-action lawsuits. The public's discontent with the data leak led straight to the plummet of stock prices. The company's reputation was tarnished and information-sensitive Koreans moved to other SNS service after the leakage. This phenomenon was directly reflected in the plunging page views for Cyworld/Nate. Between March 2011 and April 2012, the monthly UV (Unique Visitors) and PV (Page View) for Cyworld dropped from 21.5 million and 7.5 billion to 16.5 million and 1.7 billion, respectively. Statistics show that the fall in UV and PV became more dramatic after the July 2011 data leakage.

In September 2012, SK Telecom announced its decision to allow membership for Cyworld without obligating members to register resident registration numbers and real names. A minimum amount of personal information, such as email address and nationality, would be asked of future members.

Cyworld brought an end to its minihompy service on 31 September 2015 and had announced plans to change over to a new platform named Cyhome.

In July 2020 the site was not supporting TLS 1.2, causing browsers to issue a warning. It is expected that support for TLS 1.0 and 1.1 is removed from all major browsers in the second half of 2020. Cyworld's server configuration shows it to be vulnerable to several well-known and fixed attacks.

=== Takeover by CyworldZ ===
In April 2021, CyworldZ which is a subsidiary company of Cyclub Corporation took over Cyworld. CyworldZ has acquired user data from SK and geared up to jump into the market with its metaverse-powered service.

=== Engagements in foreign markets ===
After its domestic success Cyworld began to venture into foreign markets. In 2005, it started services in China and subsequently entered the Japan and Vietnam markets. Cyworld lost out to Japan's Mixi and exited the Japanese market in August 2008. As of 2009, its operations in China and Vietnam were more optimistic; it had seven million and 450,000 members, respectively.

Cyworld entered the US market in 2006, believing that many US teenagers would use multiple social networks and seeking early access to a then-quickly growing market. However, it lost market share to Facebook and exited the US market in February 2010.

In 2006 Cyworld entered a joint venture with a German Deutsche Telekom subsidiary, T-Online, and launched its European version a year later. Strong competition from site like StudiVZ and Skyrock, as well as a saturated market made for dismal future prospects, and by 2008 Cyworld had closed all operations.

=== Present ownership ===
In 2016, Cyworld was acquired by Aire, inc., which is owned by Freechal founder Jeon Jae-wan. CyworldZ took over Cyworld from Jeon Jae-wan in Dec 2020, CEO Kim Ho-gwang was dismissed from the position and Son sung-min and Kim Tae-hun were assigned as CEOs.

== Website ==
=== Ilchon ===
Ilchon is originally a Korean word that denotes very close familial relations, such as between a parent and a child. Becoming ilchon is how users in Cyworld begin their interaction. The user sends an ilchon request for another user to receive. If the request is accepted, the ilchons can see the content of each other's minihomepy that are not made available to those who are not ilchons, such as the diary and photo sections. One can also assign an interest ilchon to some of their friends. If interest ilchon is assigned, the user is notified when the interest ilchon's homepage is updated. Users can also see their friends' online statuses. Until Twitter and Facebook came out, the Il-Chon system was one of the most popular online social networking tools in Korea.

=== Dotori ===
Cyworld uses its own virtual currency called dotori (Korean: 도토리), or acorns. Dong-Hyung Lee coined the term in 2002. One dotori costs 100 won, and they are used to purchase virtual goods. Prices vary from about 2 acorns for a wall painting or 6 acorns for a song that plays in your miniroom to 40 acorns for a homepage background for your for that last for a year. (Most items purchased with dotori have a time limit.) Dotori can be given to ilchons, and is often given to friends as birthday presents.

As the currency unit for Cyworld, dotori is the main source of revenue for the company. In 2006, 80% of Cyworld's Korean income was generated from the sale of virtual goods. CLINK service has been launched in 2018 for further development of digital currency ecosystem.

CLINK has replaced dotori as podo during its service. CLINK has also shown coconut as currency.

=== Minihomepy ===
Minihomepy is essentially a cyberspace allotted to each Cyworld member. Using dotori, users can decorate their minihomepies as they see fit. Minihomepy features include the main background, history, profile, photo story, story room, background music, photo album, diary, and bulletin board, allowing for self-expression. The miniroom is a virtual room with a minime (avatar), a self-representational space that the users can decorate with virtual "items" purchased with their dotori. Dotori can be used to buy new background skins, miniroom interiors, background music, banners, and fonts. There are also other special features, such as ilchon padotagi, which are links for surfing the minihompies of fellow ilchons, and random padotagi, links for surfing the minihompies of strangers.

=== Club ===
Clubs are online communities for Cyworld minihomepy users. Like in the minihomepy, dotori can be used to decorate the clubs. It is not very different from other online clubs in other websites.

=== Blog ===
The Cyworld blog is not unlike blogs in other websites. Dotori is used for decorating users' blogs. Cyworld blogs permit anyone to access its contents, but the user can make it function as another version of minihomepy and allow it only viewable by ilchons. Wizets, photo logs, and bulletin boards are features of the blog. Cyworld blogs also link with NateOn.

=== NateOn ===
Cyworld collaborates with NateOn (네이트온), a widely used instant messenger service in Korea. If Cyworld users buy fonts with dotori in Cyworld, they can use those fonts with NateOn, too.

=== Que ===
Daily news briefing service application.

== Impact ==
Minihomepies of some public figures who use Cyworld

Cyworld has exerted significant influence on Korea's Internet culture. The popular use of the term "cyholic" is indicative of this. Self-expression is a desire that Cyworld can satisfy; Cyworld has provided a cyber space where users can readily express their feelings to ilchons. It also allows the viewer of another person's minihomepy to get satisfaction from learning about the other person's life; however, uploaded materials and diaries tend to be somewhat dissembling, if not pretentious, for the sake of gaining sympathy from other users. Minihompies succeeded in functioning as social platforms through which users could express their personal traits and private thoughts. Another unique feature of Cyworld is the tracker displayed on the upper left-hand side of the minihomepy. It shows two numbers, called today (the number of visitors to the minihomepy on that day) and total (the total number of visitors to the minihomepy). If the number of visitors is high, the visitor assumes the owner of the minihomepage is popular. Indeed, "What's his today?" was a popular phrase among Cyworld users as it was taken by many to be a sign of popularity. Online tools that manipulated such indicators of popularity were also produced: for instance, one service offered to increase the customer's today total by 20 a day,

Celebrity diaries were vastly popular, bringing about thousands of comments with each entry. Minihomepies began to function as an official way to learn about the celebrity's life, but celebrities often controlled their public images through their minihomepies. Celebrities have also employed minihomepies as a marketing strategy, using them to enhance their image or to advertise programs that they are in.

== Award ==
In 2006, Cyworld received the Wharton Infosys Business Transformation Award for being an organization that has made the best use of IT for transformation.

== Discography ==
Cyworld launched the "Cyworld BGM 2021" project which has artists remaking homepage hits.

- Soyou – "Y (Please Tell Me Why)"
- Gift – "Time Walking on Memory"
- Gaho – "Officially Missing You"
- Ailee – "Snow Flower"
- Jung Seung-hwan – "I Have a Lover"
- George – "I'll Change"
- Ha Sung-woon & Punch – "Johnny"
- Hwang Chi-yeul – "Nagging"
- Mad Clown & Lee Hae-ri – "Recipient Unknown"
- Fromis 9 (Song Ha-young, Park Ji-won, and Lee Seo-yeon) – "Star"
- Daybreak – "A Good Day"
- Wonstein – "10 Minutes"
- San E & Suran – "Photography"
- Kang Daniel & Chancellor – "Fly"
- Yuju – "By Your Side"

== See also ==
- Cyworld Digital Music Awards
- Myspace
