= KakaoTalk =

South Korean mobile messaging app

KakaoTalk 카카오톡
- Developer: Kakao Corp.
- Release: 18 March 2010; 16 years ago
- Operating system: iOS, macOS, Android, Bada, BlackBerry, Windows Phone, Windows NT, Nokia Asha, WatchOS, Wear OS
- Available in: 18 languages
- List of languages Korean, Simplified Chinese, Traditional Chinese, Japanese, English, English (Commonwealth), French, German, Italian, Spanish, Spanish (Latin America), Portuguese, Portuguese (Brazil), Russian, Indonesian, Thai, Vietnamese, Turkish
- Type: Messaging app
- License: Freeware
- Website: kakaocorp.com/service/KakaoTalk

KakaoTalk (Korean: 카카오톡), commonly referred to as KaTalk (카톡) in South Korea, is an instant messenger and online services platform operated by Kakao Corporation. It was launched in 2010, and the app is available on mobile and desktop platforms.

KakaoTalk is the most popular instant messaging app in South Korea, and since its debut in March 2010, the service has captured around 90 percent of the local market. Originally designed for messaging, it has evolved into a super-app providing mobile payments and banking, taxi hailing, games and others.

== History ==
Kakao started with KakaoTalk, an instant messaging application in March 2010, and followed up with a social media network that integrated with the messenger app.

Kakao's next step into Korea's lifestyle habits was to tap into one of the mobile gaming markets. The addition of Kakao Games allowed users to connect and play with their offline friends all through the convenience of the Kakao network.

Kakao Friends emoticons were introduced in 2012.

Since then, Kakao has continued to expand its y providing a gift shop called Kakao gift. KakaoTalk was nominated for the Most Innovative Mobile App Award at the Global Mobile Awards 2014.

Kakao Pay is a mobile payment and digital wallet service by Kakao based in South Korea that allows users to make mobile payments and online transactions. The payment service first launched on 4 September 2014 with integration with its messaging app, KakaoTalk, allowing people to request and send money to people in their contacts.

Kakao has taken steps to make KakaoTalk a safer platform. In December 2020, KakaoTalk introduced Safebot, an AI-based comment-filtering function.

The company also rolled out an artificial intelligence (AI) recommendation function for the gift section, aimed at making it easier for users to send gifts whilst searching for items.

On 23 September 2025, Kakao announced a big update to modernize the app. However, the new update created criticism related to the feed-style display of the friends tab. After the harsh criticism, on 29 September 2025, Kakao said it would roll back to the original UI as the default view for the friends tab. However, KakaoTalk re-announced on 15 October 2025, Woo Young-gyu, vice president of Kakao, that it is technically impossible to roll back the update to a previous version.

== Service ==
=== Free calling and messaging service ===
KakaoTalk provides free calling and messaging services. Like most of its type, the user is able to share photos, videos, voice messages, locations, webpage links, and contact information. Users are able to create one-on-one conversations, as well as group chats with no limit on users. It allows the user to synchronize contact lists to connect to friends who also use the service, among other options that provide this service.

=== Search for friends by KakaoTalk ID ===
The app automatically synchronizes the user's contact list on their smartphones with the contact list on the app to find friends who are on the service. Users can also search for friends by KakaoTalk ID without having to know their phone numbers. The KakaoTalk service also allows its users to export their messages and save them.

=== Plus Friend ===
KakaoTalk began as a messenger service but has become a platform for the distribution of various third-party content and apps, including hundreds of games, which users can download and play with their friends through the messaging platform. Through the "Plus Friend" feature, users can follow brands, media and celebrities to receive exclusive messages, coupons and other real-time information through KakaoTalk chatrooms. Users can also purchase real-life goods through the messenger's "Gifting" platform.

=== Kakao Pay ===
Kakao Pay is a mobile payment and digital wallet service by Kakao based in South Korea that allows users to make mobile payments and online transactions. The payment service first launched on September 4, 2014, with integration with their messaging app, KakaoTalk, allowing people to request and send money to people in their contacts. Since its launch, Kakao has expanded into other financial services by launching their own online bank called KakaoBank and releasing their own debit card. In April 2017, KakaoPay Co., Ltd. was established to run the payment services operated by the company.

=== Emoticon Plus ===
On 13 January 2021, KakaoTalk released an emoticon monthly fixed-rate service. "Emoticon Plus" is a service that allows unlimited use of Kakao's selected collection of emoticons for ₩6,900 per month. After subscribing to 'KakaoTalk Wallet', users purchase Emoticon Plus through the wallet platform rather than through in-app payment. Users who are subscribed can use all the emoticons in KakaoTalk for free, unlimited. When entering chats on KakaoTalk, it looks at the sentence being typed and recommends emoticon that fits the situation.

== Company business model ==
KakaoTalk, a free mobile messenger application for smartphones, revealed its first profits of $42 million in 2012 and $200 million in revenue for 2013. With 93% of South Korea's population using KakaoTalk on their smartphones, Kakao Corp. has provided users a large range of services including games and retail commerce.

=== KakaoTalk API ===
KakaoTalk made its platform API available for developers. A user administration-based API and a push-based API are currently available, and an analytic API is planned for release.

== Influence ==
=== Korean ===
A solitary chat room is a kind of open chat room, where many anonymous people gather to talk about specific topics, communicating only with images, without using text or emoticons. In other words, it is making a story out of images only. Similar chat rooms have sprung up as an open chat room that exchanges food pictures without a word became popular. As the popularity of the celebrity themed "solitary chat rooms" grew, celebrities went into the chat room themselves.

Darcie Draudt-Véjares of the Carnegie Endowment for International Peace argues that KakaoTalk and other social networks were one reason (alongside other factors such as a cultural emphasis on civic duty) why South Korean citizens came out in such huge numbers to oppose president Yoon Suk Yeol's declaration of martial law during the 2024 South Korean martial law crisis. These platforms allowed pro-democracy activists to spread their message to millions of users and quickly organize and direct protests and demonstrations.

=== International ===
KakaoTalk is available in 18 languages and used in over 130 countries. On 26 July 2011, Kakao Corp. established Japanese Corp., Kakao Japan and appointed Cha-Jin Park as a representative. According to company officials, the app appears to be very actively used in Japan. When a massive earthquake hit Japan on 11 March 2011, KakaoTalk's messaging traffic in Japan surged as millions of people sought to confirm the safety of friends and family. KakaoTalk played an important role as a data network-based communication method; it successfully replaced disabled wired and wireless networks and helped connect the disaster-stricken.

KakaoTalk has targeted countries in Southeast Asia where no dominant mobile messenger service stands. KakaoTalk is forming strategic partnerships in Malaysia, Indonesia and the Philippines, as well. In 2013, KakaoTalk began airing TV commercials in Indonesia, the Philippines, and Vietnam featuring Big Bang. In the ads, local celebrities and BigBang appear together to promote KakaoTalk. In late 2013, Indonesia became the country with the second-most users of KakaoTalk, after South Korea, with 13 million users and the potential to become KakaoTalk's largest market worldwide. The former co-CEO of KakaoTalk, Sirgoo Lee, stated "We grew our user base by more than 25 times in one year, so hopefully, we will continue at that rate." KakaoTalk has tailored their service to the local environment by collaborating with local designers and companies to generate "Indonesian-specific content". In February 2014, KakaoTalk launched for Nokia Asha 500, 501, 502, and 503 devices, expanding its reach to users of a wider audience.

== See also ==
- Comparison of cross-platform instant messaging clients
- Comparison of instant messaging protocols
- Comparison of Internet Relay Chat clients
- Comparison of LAN messengers
- Comparison of VoIP software
- List of SIP software
- List of video telecommunication services and product brands
