= The Host (2006 film) =

2006 film by Bong Joon Ho

- Theatrical release poster by Kim Jung-man
- Hangul: 괴물
- Hanja: 怪物
- Lit.: Monster
- RR: Goemul
- MR: Koemul
- Directed by: Bong Joon Ho
- Screenplay by: Bong Joon Ho; Ha Joon-won; Baek Chul-hyun
- Story by: Bong Joon Ho
- Produced by: Choi Yong-bae
- Starring: Song Kang-ho; Byun Hee-bong; Park Hae-il; Bae Doona; Go Ah-sung
- Cinematography: Kim Hyeong-gu
- Edited by: Kim Sun-min
- Music by: Lee Byung-woo
- Production company: Chungeorahm Film
- Distributed by: Showbox (South Korea); Kadokawa Herald (Japan)
- Release dates: May 21, 2006 (Cannes); July 27, 2006 (South Korea); September 2, 2006 (Japan)
- Running time: 119 minutes
- Countries: South Korea; Japan
- Languages: Korean; English
- Budget: ₩11 billion ($11 million)
- Box office: $102.6 million (Note: Original run as reported on March 9, 2007 – $97 million; Releases thereafter (including re-releases) – $5,648,080)

The Host (Note: Also titled Monster (Korean: 괴물; RR: Goemul) in South Korea and Goemul: The Han River Monster (Japanese: グエムル 漢江の怪物, Hepburn: Guemuru: Hangan no Kaibutsu) in Japan.) is a 2006 monster film (Note: While publications have primarily labeled The Host as a monster movie, it has also been noted for incorporating multiple genres. These genres include action, black comedy, horror, science fiction, (Note: Attributed to multiple references:) and thriller. Additionally, Vulture described it as "an indictment of American hubris disguised as a monster movie".) directed and co-written by Bong Joon Ho. It stars Song Kang-ho as food stand vendor Park Gang-du whose daughter Hyun-seo (Go Ah-sung) is kidnapped by a creature dwelling around the Han River in Seoul. Byun Hee-bong, Park Hae-il, and Bae Doona appear in supporting roles as Gang-du's father, brother, and sister, respectively, who help Gang-du escape quarantine against an alleged virus derived from the monster and search for his daughter. Considered a co-production between South Korea and Japan, the film was produced by independent studio Chungeorahm Film and presented by its South Korean distributor Showbox and the Japanese investor Happinet.

Bong had dreamed of making a monster movie since his adolescence, inspired by the Godzilla and Ultraman franchises. The catalyst for The Host was the McFarland incident that occurred in February 2000, when an American civilian working on a military base in South Korea ordered the disposal of formaldehyde down a drain leading to the Han River. Bong devised the story of a monster resulting from this incident and proposed it two years later. In 2003, he started scripting The Host with Ha Joon-won; Baek Chul-hyun joined the pair to revise the script in December 2004. Principal photography lasted from June 2005 to January 2006, mostly taking place in Seoul along the Han River. New Zealand-based special effects company Wētā Workshop modeled the creature and the American studio The Orphanage handled the visual effects. Of the film's $11 million budget, $4.5 million was spent on the over 100 visual effect shots.

An unfinished cut of The Host debuted at the 59th Cannes Film Festival on May 21, 2006, as part of the Directors' Fortnight. The finished film was released in South Korea on July 27, Japan on September 2, and in the United States on March 9, 2007. It became the highest-grossing South Korean film of all time, earning over $97 million worldwide. Many critics praised The Host as among the best films of 2006 or 2007. The film received several accolades, including the inaugural Asian Film Award for Best Film. A sequel and an American remake were later announced, but neither materialized.

In recent years, The Host has been called one of the best monster and horror films of the 21st century thus far, and it has been listed among the greatest science fiction films ever made. It is regarded as a landmark of Korean cinema and remains among South Korea's highest-grossing films. Some retrospective reviews felt that The Host has grown in relevance as COVID-19 restrictions reflected elements of the film.

== Plot ==
In 2000, an American pathologist orders his Korean assistant to dump hundreds of bottles containing formaldehyde down a drain which leads to the Han River. Over the next few years, several sightings of a strange amphibious creature in the waterway around Seoul occur.

In 2006, Park Gang-du, a slow-witted man, runs a small snack bar in Hangang Park with his father, Hee-bong. Gang-du's other family members include his daughter, Hyun-seo; his sister Nam-joo, an Olympic archer; and his brother, Nam-il, an unemployed college graduate. Around that time, a large creature emerges from the Han River and storms through the park, attacking and killing people. Gang-du, after trying to help an American combat the monster, grabs his daughter and joins the fleeing crowd, but inadvertently lets go of her hand. The monster snatches Hyun-seo and dives back into the river. After a mass funeral for the victims, those in attendance are forced to be quarantined, including the Park family. Korean government representatives and the United States Forces Korea (USFK) proclaim that the creature hosts an unknown deadly virus.

In the hospital, Gang-du receives a phone call from Hyun-seo. She says that she is trapped in the sewers with the creature, but then her phone runs out of battery. Gang-du and his family escape quarantine at the hospital and purchase supplies from gangsters to search for Hyun-seo. Meanwhile, two homeless boys, Se-jin and Se-joo, are attacked and swallowed by the creature. It returns to its lair in the sewer and regurgitates them, but only Se-joo survives. Hyun-seo helps Se-joo hide inside a nearby drain pipe where the creature cannot reach them.

The Park family encounters the monster and shoots at it until they run out of ammunition. Seemingly unharmed by the bullets, the creature kills Hee-bong and runs off. The army arrives at the scene and captures Gang-du, while Nam-il and Nam-joo escape and split up. Nam-il meets an old friend, nicknamed "Fat Guevara", hoping he could track Hyun-seo's phone call, and learns the government has placed a bounty on his family. Unbeknownst to Nam-il, Fat Guevara has contacted officials to claim the bounty, but Nam-il escapes after obtaining Hyun-seo's location, near the Wonhyo Bridge. Elsewhere, Gang-du overhears an American doctor saying the virus is a hoax invented to distract the public from the creature's origin. They decide to lobotomize Gang-du to silence him.

When the creature is sleeping, Hyun-seo tries to escape from its lair using a rope she has made from the victims' clothes, but the monster wakes up and swallows Hyun-seo and Se-joo. Meanwhile, Gang-du manages to escape by taking a nurse hostage and threatening to expose her to the virus. The government and the USFK announce a plan to release a toxic chemical called "Agent Yellow" around the river to kill the monster, concealing U.S. responsibility to maintain favor with the South Korean public. Gang-du finds the creature in its lair and sees Hyun-seo's arm dangling from its mouth. He chases it to the place that would be targeted by the chemical, where he meets Nam-joo. It attacks the crowd that assembled to protest the chemical dump. Agent Yellow is released, stunning the beast. Gang-du pulls Hyun-seo out of its mouth, discovering that she has died while clutching Se-joo, who is unconscious but alive. Enraged by her death, Gang-du attacks the creature, aided by Nam-il, Nam-joo, and a homeless man. They set it ablaze, and Gang-du impales it with a pole, finally killing it. As they mourn for Hyun-seo, Gang-du revives Se-joo.

Sometime later, Gang-du has inherited his father's snack bar and adopted Se-joo. While watching the river, he hears a noise and investigates fearing there is another monster, but finds nothing. He and Se-joo share a meal, ignoring a news broadcast stating that the incident's aftermath was due to misinformation.

== Cast ==
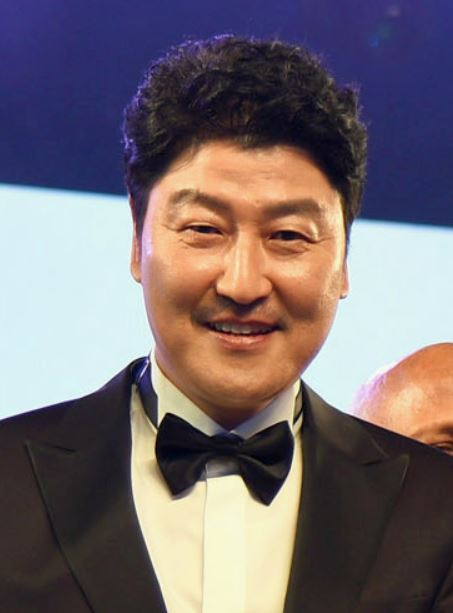
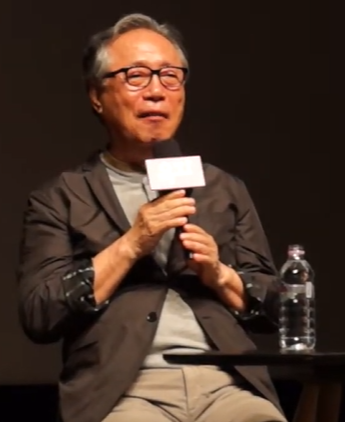
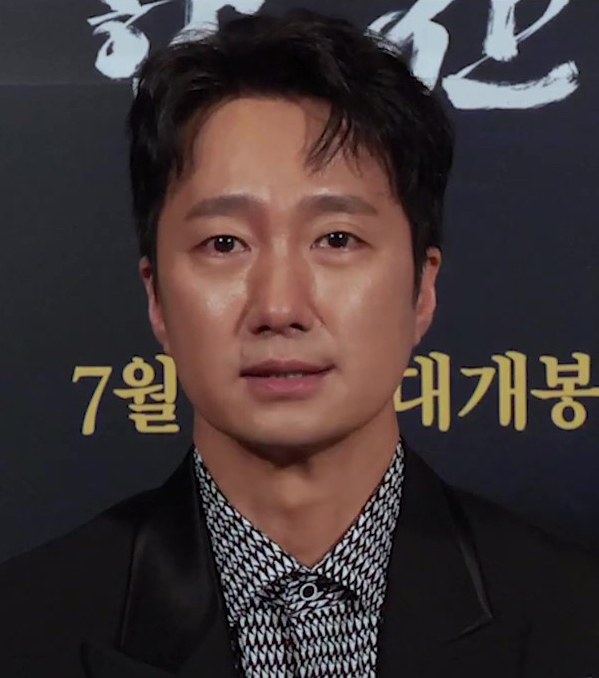
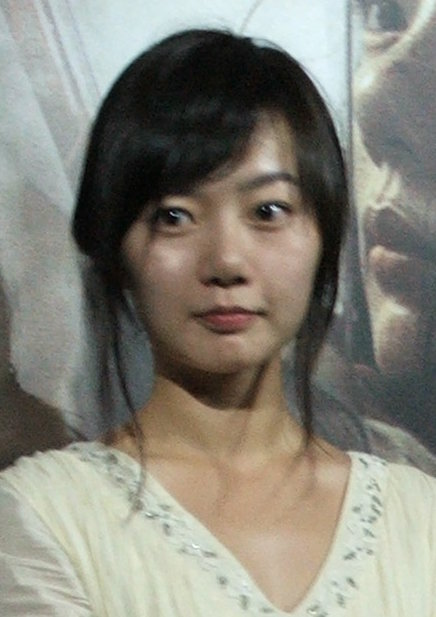
(Left to right) Song Kang-ho (pictured in 2016), Byun Hee-bong (2017), Park Hae-il (2022), and Bae Doona (2006)
- Song Kang-ho as Park Gang-du, a clumsy misfit employee in his father's snack bar, who often falls asleep. His family members often berate him, and his laziness was caused by a lack of protein as a child. However, despite being the weakest in his family mentally, he is physically the strongest and easily resists pain.
- Byun Hee-bong as Park Hee-bong, the manager of the snack bar near the Han River with Gang-du. He is the father of Gang-du, Nam-il, and Nam-joo, and grandfather of Hyun-Seo
- Park Hae-il as Park Nam-il, Gang-du's brother who is an alcoholic and former political activist.
- Bae Doona as Park Nam-joo, Gang-du's sister who is an Olympic archer.
- Go Ah-sung as Park Hyun-seo, Gang-du's teenage daughter who is embarrassed by her family, especially her father. According to her grandfather, her birth was an "accident", and her mother ran away afterward. She is kidnapped by the creature, prompting the family to search for her.

Lee Dong-ho portrays Se-joo, the younger homeless brother who follows Se-jin and later befriends Hyun-seo. Scott Wilson, David Joseph Anselmo, Paul Lazar, and Clinton Morgan play Americans stationed in South Korea (Douglas, the pathologist; Sergeant Donald White; a doctor who speaks with Gang-du; and the Agent Yellow operator, respectively). Filmmaker Yim Pil-sung, a friend of writer-director Bong Joon Ho, portrays Nam-il's senior from university 'Fat Guevara'. Other cast members include Lee Jae-eung as Se-jin; Yoon Je-moon as a homeless man; Kim Roi-ha as 'Yellow 1' (at the funeral); Go Soo-hee as the nurse who Gang-du takes hostage; and Brian Lee as Mr. Kim (the pathologist's assistant). The sounds of the Han River monster were provided by Oh Dal-su.

== Production ==
=== Conception ===
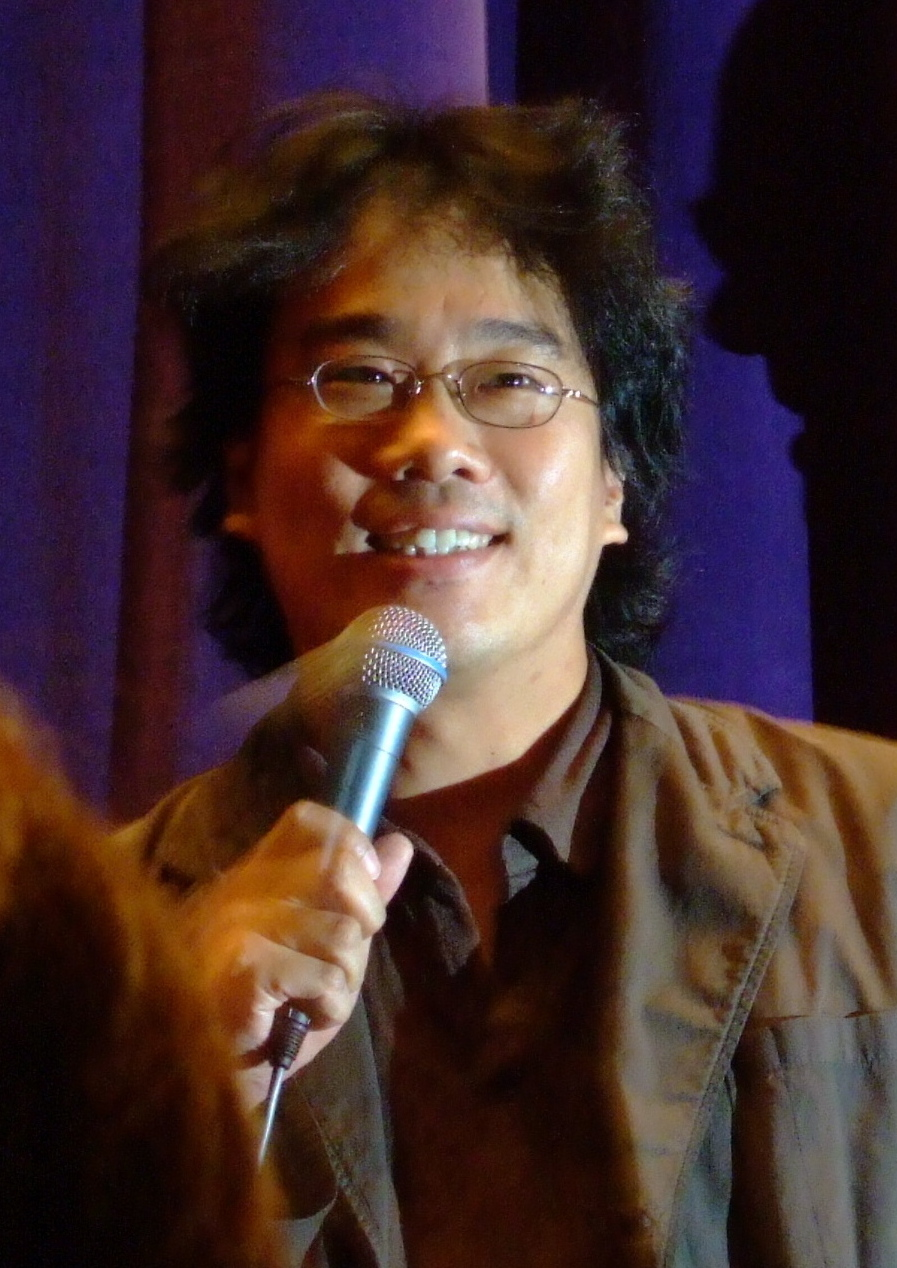
Writer-director Bong Joon Ho (pictured in 2006) began developing the idea for the film during his adolescence.

The Host was a longtime passion project that Bong had dreamed of since high school. (Note: Attributed to multiple references:) During his youth, he was a fan of the kaiju genre, frequently viewing entries in the Godzilla and Ultraman franchises on the American Forces Korea Network (AFKN). In a 2006 interview, he added that he was "unhappy about the lack of a monster movie tradition in [South Korea]". (Note: Several monster films had, however, been produced in South Korea, but significantly fewer than in Japan. These include Bulgasari (1962), Space Monster Wangmagwi, Yongary, Monster from the Deep (both 1967), A*P*E (1976), The Flying Monster (1984), and Yonggary (1999).) Having also developed a fascination with mythical creatures, he imagined a Nessie-like monster rising from the Han River and disrupting Seoul residents' daily routines. Moreover, Bong claimed that he once saw a creature crawling up and falling off the Jamsil Bridge during his high school years in 1987. He said, "that day I promised myself to make a film about this if I became a director, at all costs".

In 2000, Bong felt further encouraged to make his own monster movie in response to the widely reported McFarland incident that occurred in February of that year, around the same time as his directorial debut, Barking Dogs Never Bite, was released. The scandal involved an American civilian, Albert McFarland, ordering his employees at a military base mortuary to dump around 470 bottles containing formaldehyde into a drain that fed into the Han River. (Note: Attributed to multiple references:) In addition to environmental concerns, this incident caused some antagonism toward the United States. The film's opening scene was directly based upon this event, with Scott Wilson playing a McFarland-esque character.

Bong took inspiration from the Japanese films Godzilla and Seven Samurai (both 1954) for setting the film's tone and rainy climax, respectively. Furthermore, Guillermo del Toro's Mimic (1997) and M. Night Shyamalan's Signs (2002) were significant influences on the film. Bong indicated that Jaws (1975), Alien (1979), and The Thing (1982) may have also inspired him while making it.

=== Development ===
Bong proposed the film in 2002, and began developing it while making his second feature film Memories of Murder (released in 2003). Many of Bong's friends and colleagues initially discouraged him from making a monster movie because they perceived that people generally considered the genre to be "childish and juvenile". However, after Memories of Murder became a commercial success, Bong won the trust of financiers and the movie's production was authorized. In 2003, Bong directed the short film Sink and Rise, which featured Byun playing a food stand vendor near the Han River; it is now considered to be a prequel to The Host. Bong and Ha Joon-won started scripting The Host that same year; Baek Chul-hyun joined the pair for revision in December 2004. Ha recalled that they initially consulted materials at the National Library of Korea during scripting:

I read a lot of science dissertations. I studied the details by looking at the photographs. I studied the reproductive stage of leeches. How those things mate and how they reproduce and even about how they might mutate. At the very beginning stages, after going through that process, we were getting close to the idea of the creature.

During the writing process, the crew spent two years scouting locations around the Han River. At the 2004 Busan International Film Festival, Bong announced that the script was still in revision, revealed that the film's English title would be The Host, and presented publicity stills of the monster. The Host became a co-production between South Korea and Japan; Chungeorahm Film served as the production studio and the film's South Korean distributor Showbox is credited as a presenter alongside Happinet, a Japanese company that had invested $4.8 million into the production. The film ultimately had a budget of ₩11 billion (roughly $11 million in 2006), (Note: Attributed to multiple references:) making it very costly by Korean industry standards. According to Variety, it became one of the most expensive independent films ever produced in South Korea.

=== Creature design ===
Jang Hee-cheol designed the film's creature in collaboration with Bong. Development of the creature began in December 2003; more than 2,000 drawings were reportedly submitted until the final design was decided upon. The monster was designed with some specific characteristics in mind. According to the director, the inspiration came from a local article about a deformed fish with an S-shaped spine caught in the Han River, encouraged the design to be more realistically mutated and fish-like, rather than a fantastical one. Bong also felt the monster's design should allow the monster to run and perform certain acrobatic movements.

=== Casting ===
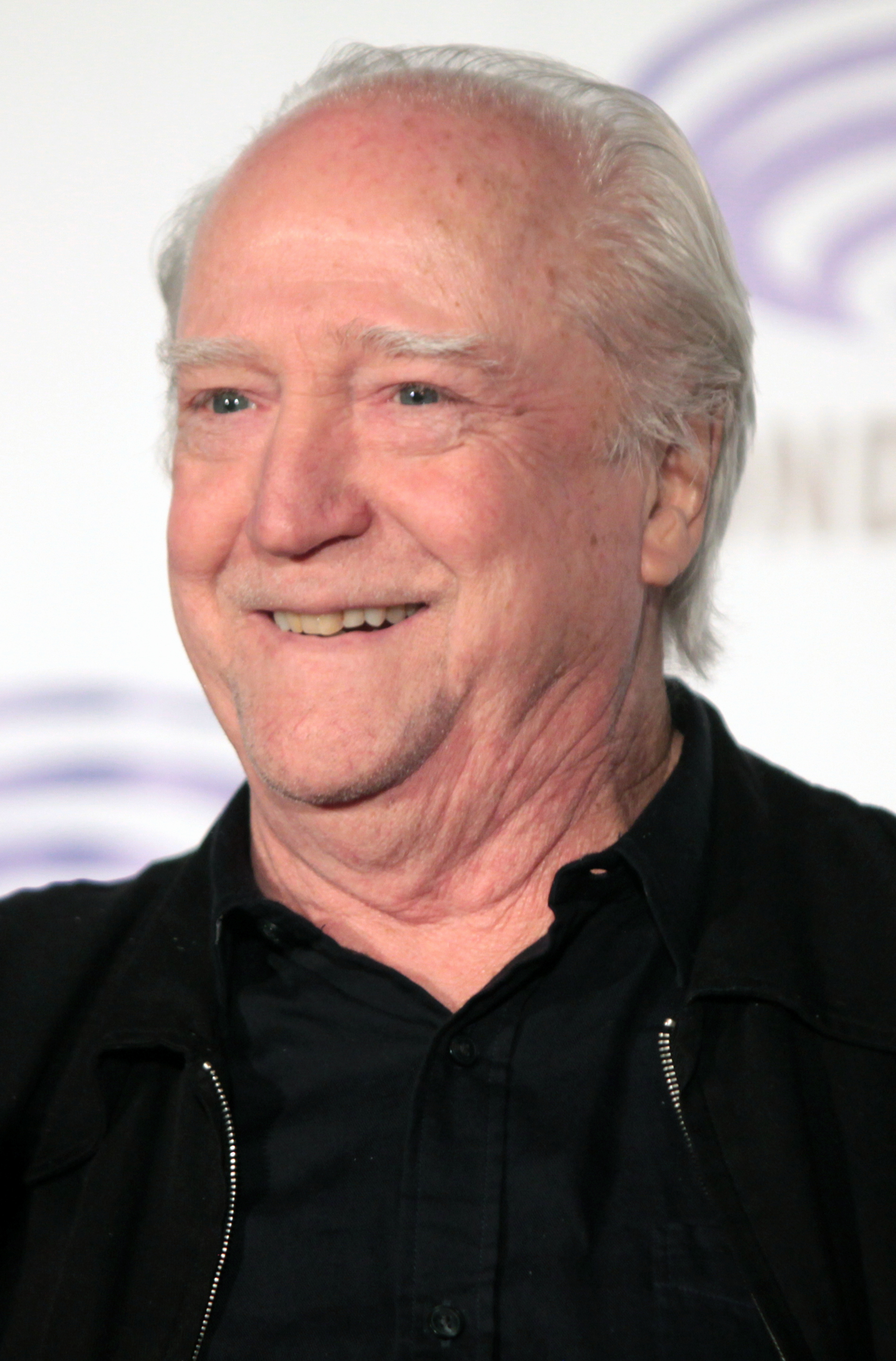
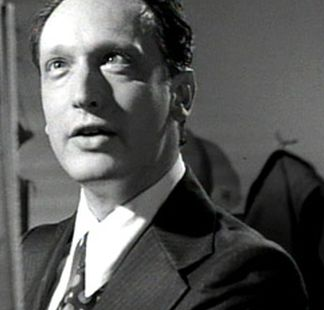
Scott Wilson (pictured in 2016) and Paul Lazar (c. 1993)

In June 2005, it was confirmed that Song, Byun, Park Hae-il, and Bae would star in the film, all of whom except Bae had worked with Bong on Memories of Murder. Song received ₩500 million for the role of Gang-du, and he partly dyed his hair yellow in preparation to play the character. According to Bong, newcomer Go Ah-sung was cast in the film "in a very big audition process". Yim, as Fat Guevara, had no experience in acting and was faced with an awkward set up by Bong for his role: "[Bong] once asked me if I 'took an interest in acting'. Sometime later, I went to his office, and an unexpected audition had been arranged, and I had to suddenly perform in front of actor Park Hae-il." Bong and an American casting director chose Hollywood veterans Wilson and Lazar to portray the Americans stationed in South Korea. The two actors quickly agreed to appear in the film to the crew's surprise. Bong's preference for Lazar was based on his performance in The Silence of the Lambs (1991).

Bong decided to hire someone to dub over the Han River monster after he was dissatisfied by the attempts at creating realistic sounding roars. During a night out drinking with Bong and Song, Oh Dal-su volunteered to provide the sounds for the creature.

=== Filming ===
Principal photography began on June 29, 2005 and wrapped on January 8, 2006. The Korean Film Council estimates that 80% of the film was filmed on location along the Han River in Seoul at locations such as Yeouido Park, Seogang Bridge, Dongjak Bridge, Hangang Bridge, Jamsil Bridge, and Wonhyo Bridge. Some of the shooting also took place in the real sewers near the river. Thus, the stars and crew were inoculated against tetanus and had to deal with the effects of changes in weather and ambient temperature. Crew member Song Yong-woon said he had "no good memories of the sewer experience", recalling, in particular, an incident where mosquito larvae swarmed the ground in response to a flashlight.

American visual effects supervisor Kevin Rafferty worked closely with Bong during filming. He thought the Korean cast and crew were more passionate than those in Hollywood and was surprised by the fact that the crew was editing the movie at the same time as filming. Wilson traveled to South Korea in August 2005, and Lazar followed shortly after, completing his scenes in September 2005. Morgan and Anselmo experienced visa issues, breaching Article 20 of South Korea's Immigration Control Act by working on a project in the country without government authorization and were deported under coercion. The only work permit Morgan had received was to teach English at the University of Suwon, while Anselmo had a 90-day short-term work permit.

=== Visual effects ===
The Host was Bong's first film to feature visual effects, and he had to work around the budget-imposed restrictions, especially when it came to the special effects. Bong initially approached the New Zealand-based company Wētā FX and American studio Industrial Light & Magic (ILM) to handle the film's visual effects, but both requested prices that were out of reach. ILM wanted ₩100 million per shot, which would have brought the 120 visual effect shots of the monster alone to a cost of ₩12 billion. The computer-generated imagery (CGI) for the film was ultimately done by the American visual effects studio The Orphanage, which also did some of the visual effects for The Day After Tomorrow (2004). Bong stated that, of the film's US$11 million budget, $4.5 million was spent on the over 100 visual effect shots.

A maquette of the creature was modeled by the New Zealand-based special effects company Wētā Workshop while John Cox's Creature Workshop in Queensland made animatronics of it. The digital model was initially created using Silo and arranged in Maya. Bong estimates the film used 110 shots of the digital model, while around twelve feature the life-sized head and mouth animatronics. Animator Tim Dobbert created a match moving arrangement combining rotoscoped elements with alpha compositing to enhance the insertion of the monster into the live-action environment, accelerating the animation process.

The animators looked at real-life creatures and films when rendering the monster. According to Rafferty, the team drew inspiration from the creatures appearing in several Hollywood films, including Predator (1987), Jurassic Park (1993), Dragonheart (1996), and Blade II (2002). They also burnt a bass and trout at the studio to use as reference for the scene where the monster goes up in flames. Corey Rosen, who oversaw the creation and animation of the creature's model, noted that Johnny Eck's motions in Freaks (1932) were used as references for the creature's movement since Eck had a legless body and carried his weight on his arms like the creature.

=== Music ===
Lee Byung-woo, who had an experience in the horror genre, composed the film's score. While Bong rarely uses music in his films, Lee, who had never collaborated with him before, convinced Bong to allow him to incorporate as much music as he would like, as he felt the film would be "stiff" without it. Lee initially considered an inclusion of a large orchestra recorded during overseas scoring sessions, but concluded it neither fitted the film's theme of poverty nor Bong's style. In a February 2006 interview conducted while Lee was still working on the score, he explained that he intended to emphasize the character's emotions in the themes and make it seem "very Korean, but [...] not like traditional Korean music".

== Release ==
Due to the success of Bong's previous film, Memories of Murder, The Host was highly anticipated. An incomplete, 114-minute, print of the film premiered at the Cannes Film Festival on May 21, 2006, as part of the Directors' Fortnight. Foreign distributors subsequently bought the rights to the film for $2.3 million. The film was widely promoted in South Korea; photographer Kim Jung-man made the film's posters. On July 27, 2006, it was released on 620 theater screens in South Korea, a record number in the country at that time. It made the South Korean record books for its box office performance during its opening weekend. The 2.63 million admissions and US$17.2 million box office revenue decisively beat the previous records set by Typhoon (2005). The film reached six million viewers on August 6, 2006, and by the end of its nine-week run in South Korea, the film had grossed more than $90 million, while the number of viewers reached 13,019,740.

According to the Special Broadcasting Service (SBS), The Host became Bong's first film to receive an international distribution. In Japan, it was highly anticipated, but became a box office bomb on its September 2, 2006 premier showed on 250 screens, placing seventh on opening weekend. South Korean analyst Kim Bong-seok noted: "The recent Godzilla film was a box office failure, and the tastes of young audiences are changing. In addition, the audience base of Korean movies that have gained popularity due to the Korean Wave so far is different from the audience base of monster movies, which seems to have had a negative effect." It received a wide releases in France on November 22, 2006, and in the United States on March 9, 2007, the latter distributed by Magnolia Pictures.

Sources state that The Host set a new record for the highest-grossing South Korean film, (Note: Attributed to multiple references:) but box office figures are inconsistent. The Hollywood Reporter reported that it grossed around $90 million worldwide. According to the box-office tracking websites Box Office Mojo and the Numbers, The Host earned $2.2 million in the United States and Canada, and $87.2 million to $90.4 million in other territories, giving the film a worldwide total of $89.4 million to $92.6 million. According to Chungeorahm Film's March 9, 2007 theatrical profit estimate, the film had earned $97 million. Including that total with recorded figures for releases thereafter, the total is $102,648,080. It grossed $315,936 on its November 20, 2026 re-release in the United States and Australia.

== Reception ==
=== Critical response ===
On almost every level, there's never quite been a monster movie like The Host. Subverting its own genre while still delivering shocks and marbled with straight-faced character humor that constantly throws the viewer off balance, [this] much-hyped big-budgeter [...] is a bold gamble that looks headed to instant cult status.

— Derek Elley, Variety

The Host garnered widespread critical praise. (Note: Attributed to multiple references:) On the review aggregator website Rotten Tomatoes, 93% of 156 critics' reviews are positive, with an average rating of 7.7/10. The website's consensus reads: "As populace pleasing as it is intellectually satisfying, The Host combines scares, laughs, and satire into a riveting, monster movie." Metacritic, which uses a weighted average, assigned the film a score of 85 out of 100, based on 35 critics, indicating "universal acclaim". Moreover, several publications listed it among the top films of 2006 or 2007. (Note: Attributed to multiple references:) In IndieWire's 2007 critics poll, it placed 17th on their Best Film list based on 19 mentions; Bong also tied for 16th on the Best Director list.

South Korean journalists believed the film demonstrated Bong's expertise, and generally lauded the blend of comedy and horror. Meanwhile, the American press mostly praised the film's recreational appeal, originality, and political satire. Manohla Dargis considered it the greatest film shown at the 2006 Cannes Film Festival. She wrote in The New York Times: "The Host is a loopy, feverishly imaginative genre hybrid about the demons that haunt us from without and within." The Tokyo Shimbun spoke positively of how the film has a "different taste" from American horror movies. The Asahi Shimbun lauded the "eventful" script, "light tone", special effects, themes, suspense, and humor. Dana Stevens described it as a "flawless monster movie". Some reviewers were, however, more critical; Kim Soyoung dismissed the latter half of the film as "nihilistic" while Lee Hyun-kyung felt the "allegory was one-dimensional and the banter was often over the top".

Moon Seok of the South Korean film magazine Cine21 cited the performances of Song, Byun, Park, Bae, and Go as the film's central strength because they added emotional intensity to the film. According to the Korean Film Council, Bong's collaboration with Song and Bae was "praised for its entertainment value in combination with social and political commentary". Adrian Martin highlighted Bae's performance, believing that "[Bong's] collaboration with Bae adds a dimension that no American blockbuster can even approach". Wilson's performance was singled out by Jim Emerson of RogerEbert.com who noted that he was "clearly having fun".

Western reviewers often compared The Host to Godzilla and many other monster movies from the 20th century. (Note: Attributed to multiple references:) Empire described it "as if Ken Loach remade Godzilla". Martin said the experience of watching the film was akin to seeing Jaws upon its initial 1975 release, but described Bong as a "much more interesting and intricate director than Spielberg will ever be". Adam Nayman pointed out similarities to Wendigo (2001), with characters feeding the monster and unknowingly provoking it to eat them. Moreover, he highlighted the way Bong acquaints the audience with the monster, the aspect which, according to Nayman, was praised by significant number of other critics. The scene when the monster first comes ashore was "awe-inspiring, exotic, [and] even a touch humorous" for Peter Bradshaw, but he felt it was not as daunting in comparison to Ridley Scott's Alien (1979). Moon Seok and Heo Moon-young compared the film to Bong's previous work on Memories of Murder, remarking that both films incorporate genre-blending and political critique, but noted that The Host has a greater emphasis on these themes.

=== Accolades ===
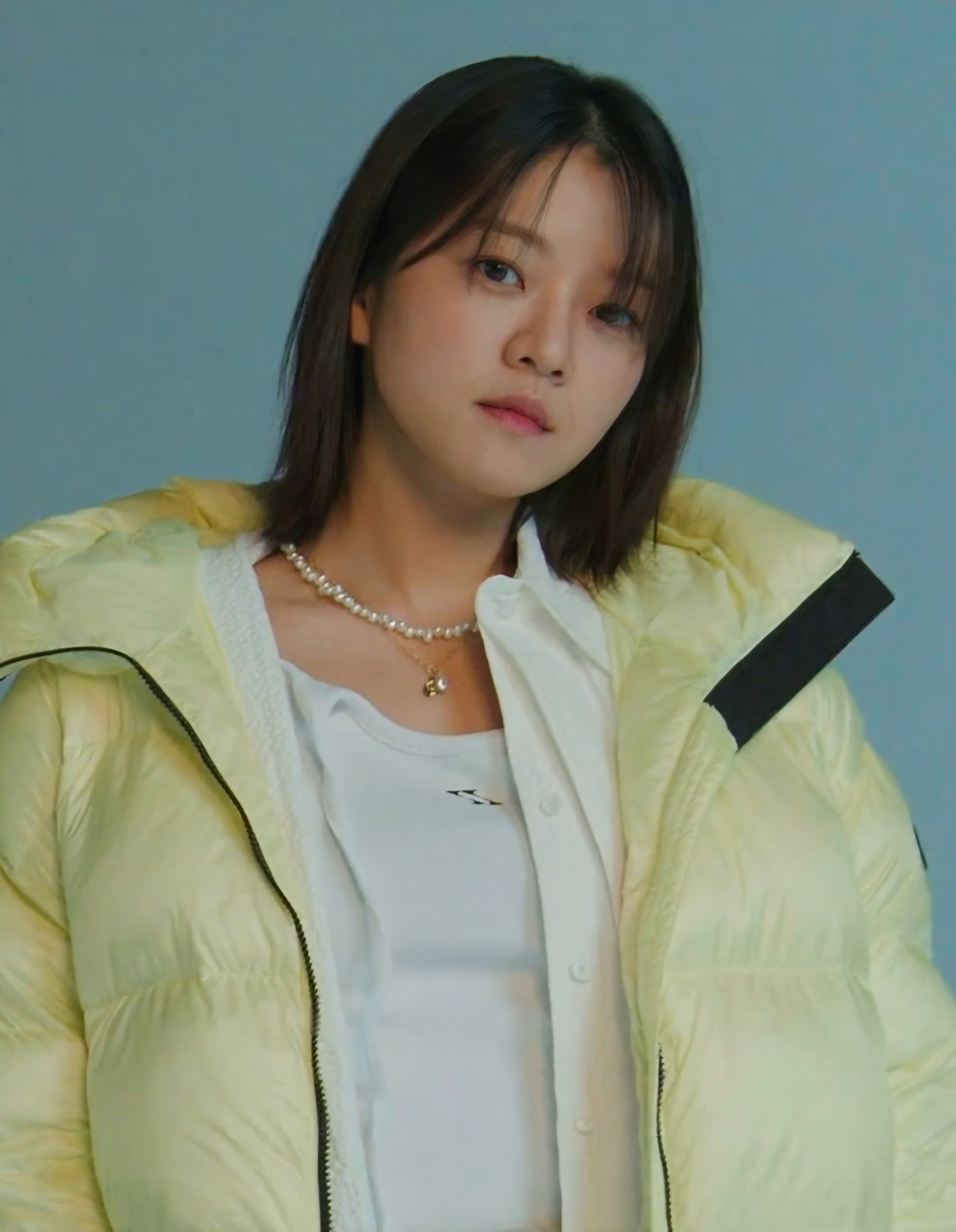
The performance of Go Ah-sung (pictured in 2022) earned several nominations.

The Host was nominated for many Asian film awards in several categories, particularly for Bong's direction, Kim Hyung-koo's cinematography, and Song's performance. At the 1st Asian Film Awards held in March 2007, the film dominated the competition and won four out of its five nominations. It won the inaugural award in the Best Film, Best Actor (Song), Best Cinematographer (Kim Hyung-koo), and Best Visual Effects (The Orphanage) categories. In South Korea, The Host won six Blue Dragon Film Awards; five Korean Film Awards; three Director's Cut Awards; and two Grand Bell Awards. Go was nominated for the Baeksang Arts Award for Best New Actress as well as the Grand Bell Award and Korean Film Award for Best Supporting Actress. She also won the Blue Dragon Film Award for Best New Actress and Director's Cut Award for Best Actress (the latter won jointly with Bae).

Moreover, the film received a number of Western awards from critics' organizations and film festivals. Among its nominations were Best International Film and Best Young Actor/Actress (Go) at the 33rd Saturn Awards, and the Belgian Film Critics Association's 2008 Grand Prix. Bong was awarded Best Director in Competition at Fantasporto and the film won the Golden Raven at the Brussels International Fantastic Film Festival. After being screened at the 2006 Toronto International Film Festival along with Lee Joon-ik's The King and the Clown (2005) and Kim Ki-duk's Time (2006), The Host joined the other two films as a contender for South Korea's submission for Best International Feature Film at the 79th Academy Awards, but lost to The King and the Clown.

=== Plagiarism controversy ===
Some Japanese and South Korean viewers thought that The Host strongly resembled the 2002 anime thriller film WXIII: Patlabor the Movie 3. The Yukan Fuji reported that these comparisons resulted in a "plagiarism suspicion uproar". Similarities noted by Internet users included the anti-Americanism theme, sewer setting, climax, and monster design. However, many cinephiles also questioned these claims. Happinet issued a statement maintaining that "if there was plagiarism, we would not have invested in or helped to distribute it in the first place". A representative of Chungeorahm Film said: "I am confident that if Japanese viewers directly watch the anime that has been suggested as the source material, they will never instantly conclude that it is similar to The Host. We also think that the plagiarism allegations are just a random incident." According to The Host's Japanese distributor Kadokawa Herald Pictures, Bong had never heard of the Patlabor franchise.

== Post-release ==
=== Unproduced subsequent films ===
==== The Host 2 ====
A shot from the 2012 test footage for The Host 2. This footage encouraged the public to believe that the sequel had begun production. By 2019, however, the film had been canceled without disclosure.

Shortly after the film's release, producer Choi Yong-bae hired his friend Kang Full to write The Host 2. (Note: Korean: 괴물2; RR: goemul2; lit. Monster 2) The sequel's development was publicized in June 2007, with a scheduled release date of 2009. Sources presumed that another filmmaker would direct the sequel since Bong openly refused to. Chungeorahm Film announced in January 2008 that Kang had completed the first draft of the screenplay, now planned as a prequel to The Host featuring several monsters. The following month, Variety reported that principal photography on the film was set to begin later that year on a budget of around $12 million. In June, plans were announced for a localization of The Host 2 for Chinese audiences, featuring a predominantly Chinese cast. Kang ultimately abandoned the project.

The film re-entered development in 2009 again as a sequel. A new group of writers was brought onto the project, and a company in Singapore agreed to subsidize it with $5 million. In November 2009, Twitch Film revealed that the screenplay was being reworked with a simultaneous video game adaptation, planned as a multi-platform first-person shooter. According to The Hollywood Reporter in October 2010, a demo reel of the movie would debut at the Tokyo International Film Festival in 2010, with a projected release in mid-2012. Their report also stated that it was now set to become a 3D film with a $17.6 million budget, and its script "under last-minute revision". By that time, Park Myung-cheon had agreed to direct the film. Test footage starring Kwak Do-won was released in Summer 2012. IndieWire initially mistook the demo reel for a clip from the sequel, which together with the surrounding reporting encouraged the public to believe that filming had begun. IndieWire later clarified that it was a promotional test reel; the site also mentioned that Yim Pil-sung was working on the screenplay.

In November 2014, OBS reported that casting for The Host 2 had recently commenced. Principal photography was expected to begin in 2015 under Park's direction as a Chinese-Korean co-production, with an intended 2016 release date. In 2019, Cine21 declared that, despite rumors from 2016 indicating that principal photography had occurred, The Host 2 had been canceled.

==== American remake ====
The success of The Host piqued Hollywood studios' interest to make a remake. Screen International reported in November 2006 that Cineclick Asia had sold the remake rights to Universal Studios, turning down the offers from Plan B Entertainment, 20th Century Fox, and Michael De Luca. Universal executives subsequently assigned Roy Lee and Doug Davidson of Vertigo Entertainment to co-produce the film. In November 2008, it was announced that the remake would be produced by Gore Verbinski, written by Mark Poirier, and directed by first-time filmmaker Fredrik Bond. The film was set to be released in 2011.

=== Home media and 3D remaster ===
The film was released on DVD in the United States on July 24, 2007, in both single-disc and a two-disc collector's edition in DVD, HD-DVD and Blu-ray Disc formats. A 3D remaster of the film, titled The Host 3D, premiered at the 2011 Busan International Film Festival, as a prelude for The Host 2, which was still in development at the time. The Host 3D was produced on a budget of ₩1.5 billion, and handled by Studio Raon. According to the company's CEO Kim Moon-ki they wanted to "stay faithful to director Bong's intentions and not let the effects distract the viewer". Bong, who is reportedly wary of technological innovations such as 3D films, was shown the 3D remaster early and said he was impressed by it.

== Themes and interpretations ==
In the film, the United States Forces Korea is portrayed as uncaring about the effects their activities have on the locals. Bong said the alleged virus discovered by the U.S. base was intended to be "[his] satirical take on the absence of WMD in Iraq". The chemical agent used by the American military to combat the monster, named "Agent Yellow" in a thinly veiled reference to Agent Orange, was also used to satirical effect. South Korean viewers debated whether the film was anti-American following its release. Bong responded to the anti-American assertions on Korean Broadcasting System (KBS)'s radio service, saying: "It's a stretch to simplify The Host as an anti-American film, but there is certainly a metaphor and political commentary about the U.S." He later clarified he did not intend to represent the anti-American sentiment in Korea and expressed discomfort with the Los Angeles Times claiming in a report that this was his intent. According to ScreenAnarchy, North Korean leader Kim Jong Il lauded The Host for its reputed anti-Americanism and referred to the United States Forces Korea as the actual "monster of the Han River". North Korea issued a statement praising the film for incorporating such themes: "The Host reflected South Korea's reality and people's psychology there. In the South, environmental crimes by the U.S. troops are very serious and is a life or death matter directly related to people". During a hearing on September 27, 2006 regarding potential threats to the US-South Korea alliance, the United States House Committee on Foreign Affairs mentioned The Host and its popularity in South Korea. The committee noted that South Korean politician Jung Chung-rae wrote an article after watching the film, titled "We Must Look at the United States, the Real 'Monster' of This Land". Contrarily, The Washington Post and Song Kwang-ho both agreed that the film was "by no means anti-American".

The Host is also critical of the South Korean government, which is portrayed as bureaucratic, inept, and essentially uncaring. Korean youth protesters are also satirized in the film, shown as partially heroic and partially self-righteous and oblivious. According to Bong, the Park Nam-il character is a deliberate anachronism, a reference to South Korea's troubled political history which involved violent protest. The administrations of Lee Myung-bak and Park Geun-hye later blacklisted Bong for making Memories of Murder, The Host, and Snowpiercer (2013), alleging "[The Host] highlights anti-Americanism and governmental incompetence, pushing the society leftward".

Bong has said that the film's English title, The Host, can be analyzed as describing several of its themes:

"A host is the opposite of the word of parasite. But if you were to expand on that here in the film, the central focal point of the film is the protagonists family. This loser family. Whatever is tormenting this family, that is making life hard for them or oppressing them, you could say that whoever, whatever is not helping them on the whole ... its a host of all those things. It could be the creature itself, it could be the system that doesn't help this family, Korean society, America, a wide spectrum of meaning for the host."

The film lacks a mother figure, which professor Baek Moon-im believes enhances its comedic moments depicting Gang-du as a struggling single father. He added that, if a mother character had been introduced, the film's tone would have likely completely changed to be in the vein of Bong's 2009 film Mother. Scholar James Lloyd Turner interpreted the Han River monster as feminine, writing that "its small size, clumsiness, and physical otherness are all inversions of monster movie conventions and function to code The Host's monster as feminine." The creature is not given a name in its film, unlike masculine cinematic monsters like King Kong and Godzilla, which, as Turner believes, was avoided because "a family name is passed on from a father to his offspring and so names are associated with masculinity". He also suggests that the United States is represented as the monster's father and South Korea as its mother.

== Legacy ==
=== Cultural influence ===
The Host remains one of South Korea's highest-grossing films ever, and is considered a landmark of Korean cinema. It was Bong's first film to gain major worldwide attention, helping expand his cult following. The Host has also inspired numerous films, and launched a minor resurgence in the monster genre in South Korea, with the subsequent movies including D-War (2007), Chaw (2009), and Sector 7 (2011). Bong later featured monsters in his films Okja (2017) and Mickey 17 (2025), which he also co-designed with Jang. According to Cine21, J. J. Abrams once informed Bong that Cloverfield (2008) and Super 8 (2011) reference the film. Kong: Skull Island (2017) director Jordan Vogt-Roberts cited The Host, especially its early introduction of the monster, as an inspiration. After Bong won several awards for Parasite (2019) at the 92nd Academy Awards, filmmakers Scott Beck and Bryan Woods revealed on Twitter that "The Host has been a huge influence on many of [their] scripts, including A Quiet Place." In March 2025, Godzilla Minus One director Takashi Yamazaki told Bong that The Host was an inspiration. Maggie Kang and Chris Appelhans, the directors of KPop Demon Hunters, have also said they were inspired by The Host's tone and style. Kang selected the film for screening at the 30th Busan International Film Festival and had a pre-screening Q&A about the film there.

According to Korea.net in May 2014, the film and its monster left a lasting cultural impression on South Koreans, with many Seoul residents continuing to associate rainy days near the Han River with scenes depicted in the film. Later that year, a 10-meter-long sculpture of the film's monster was placed in Hangang Park as a tourist attraction. After much backlash from locals who considered the sculpture a "waste of money", it was removed in 2024.

=== Later reception ===
Since its release, several publications have named The Host as one of the greatest science fiction films ever made, and among the best monster and horror films of the 21st century thus far. (Note: Attributed to multiple references:) IndieWire also called it the century's defining monster film. The film placed number 81 on Empire's list of "The 100 Best Films of World Cinema"; appeared on Entertainment Weekly's lists of the 25 best monster movies and Korean horror films of all time, and on the Rotten Tomatoes' list of the greatest horror movies. It is also listed in the film reference book 1001 Movies You Must See Before You Die.

In 2009, filmmaker Quentin Tarantino listed The Host among his Top 20 Favorite Films released since his directorial debut in 1992. Upon meeting Bong in 2013, Tarantino described how he was "blown away" by the film. He felt that Bong succeeded in "recreating the [monster] genre" through focusing on a "weird, f[uck]ed up family". Similarly, actress Tilda Swinton said the film "completely blew [her] away," sparking her interest in Bong's work, which ultimately led to her starring in his films Snowpiercer (2013) and Okja. A poll conducted by Film Comment in 2010 regarding the top films of the 2000s, voted by filmmakers, critics, and academics, ranked The Host 71st with 441 votes, ahead of Bong's Memories of Murder (which placed 84th). That same year, French film magazine Cahiers du Cinéma ranked it the 4th best film of the decade. In 2014, South Korean audiences voted The Host the 9th greatest Korean film of all time and Bong's second best (after Memories of Murder).

Many retrospectives in the early 2020s felt that The Host had become more relevant as elements of it later came to reflect the COVID-19 pandemic and its national responses. (Note: Attributed to multiple references:) The Guardian and The Quill compared scenes involving a supposed virus outbreak, which featured quarantine, widespread mask usage, reports that symptoms resemble the flu, anxiety, and misinformation.

In 2024, Deadline Hollywood included the film's monster on their list of the "Top 50 Movie Monsters Of All Time". Likewise, A. A. Dowd of The Washington Post ranked the creature as the scariest cinematic monster of the 21st century. He wrote that "the Gwoemul [sic] is a marvel of singular creature design that suggests a fish crossed with a frog crossed with one of the dinosaurs of Jurassic Park." In 2025, The Hollywood Reporter listed the film among "The Best Anti-Fascist Films of All Time". Upon the release of Mickey 17 that same year, The Host placed second on TheWrap's ranking of all Bong's feature films and first on IndieWire's. In July 2025, it ranked number 71 on Rolling Stone's list of "The 100 Best Movies of the 21st Century." Guillermo del Toro also praised the film and its monster's design.
