= Hangang Park =

Twelve parks in Seoul, South Korea

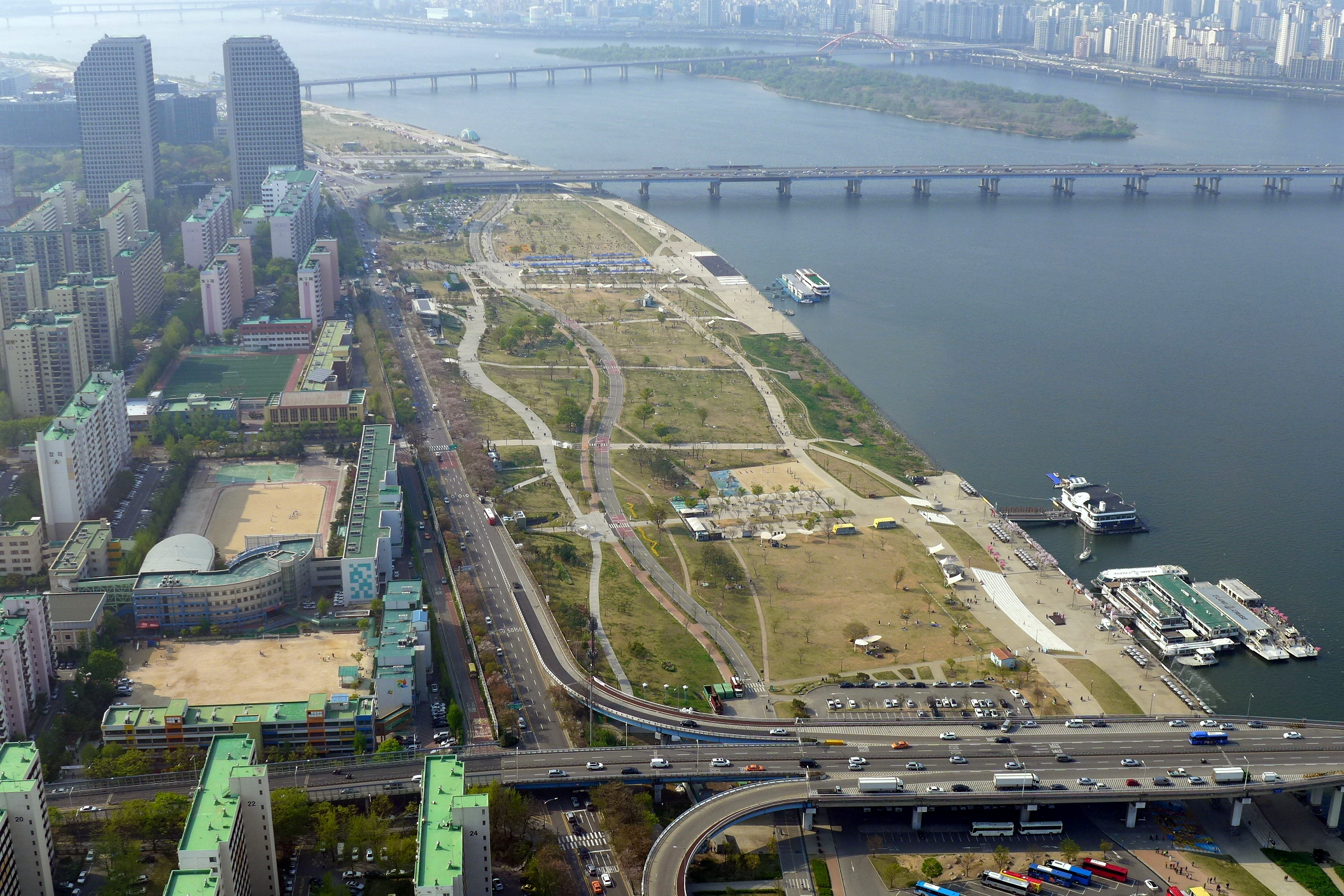
- Aerial view of Yeouido Hangang Park (2016)

Korean name
- Hangul: 한강공원
- Hanja: 漢江公園
- RR: Hangang gongwon
- MR: Han'gang kongwŏn

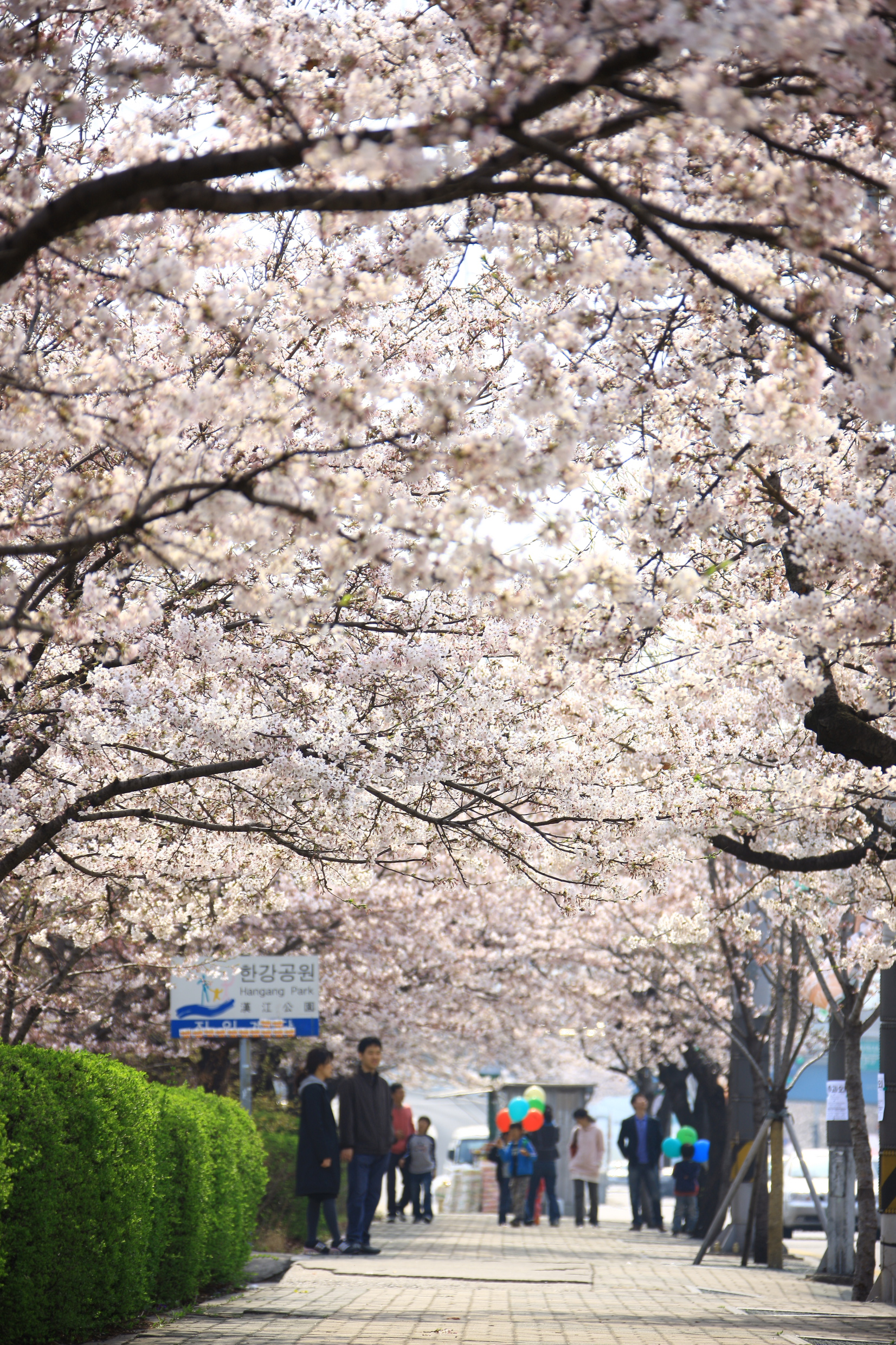
Yeouido Hangang Park during spring

Hangang Park (Korean: 한강공원) is a park that consists of 12 parks in Seoul, South Korea. It consists of Gwangnaru Park, Jamsil Park, Ttukseom Park, Jamwon Park, Ichon Park, Banpo Park, Mangwon Park, Yeouido Park, Nanji Park, Gangseo Park, Yanghwa Park, and Seonyudo Park.

In Hangang Park, there is an abundance of sporting facilities such as soccer fields, skateboarding and in-line skating parks, tennis courts, hiking/biking trails, etc. There are also many swimming pools and many water-related sports such as water-skiing, yachting, boat racing, and fishing.

== History ==
Hangang Park was built from 1982 to 1986, with the government's launch of the Han River Development Project. The main goal of the project was to create an environmently friendly space that the citizens of Seoul, Koreans, foreigners and tourists can enjoy. While building the Hangang Park, a section of Hangang, 41.5 km long and 39.9 km^{2} large, turned into a river of 2.5m of average depth and 1 km of average width.

In 2007, the Hangang Renaissance Project was launched with the same goal, and will terminate in 2030. The project will transform the Hangang Parks and the areas around Hangang into a place of culture, art, leisure, and riverside cities. The main theme is creation and restoration, and each of the park area is designated a special theme that will be used as a basis to develop the park and surrounding area.

== The parks ==
=== Yeouido Park ===
Yeouido Park (여의도 한강공원) is located in Yeouido. It has an area of 1,487,374m^{2} and a length of 8.4 km. It is accessible by public transportation such as subway and buses. It also has various events such as the Hangang Spring Flower Festival, the Seoul International Fireworks Festival, various performances, and marathon events.

It was closed on April 1, 2020, because of the spread of COVID-19. Restriction was lifted on October 14, 2020, in the first phase of social distancing. On June 24, 2020, five people infected with COVID-19 were revealed to have used a convenience store at Yeouido Hangang Park.

=== Banpo Park ===
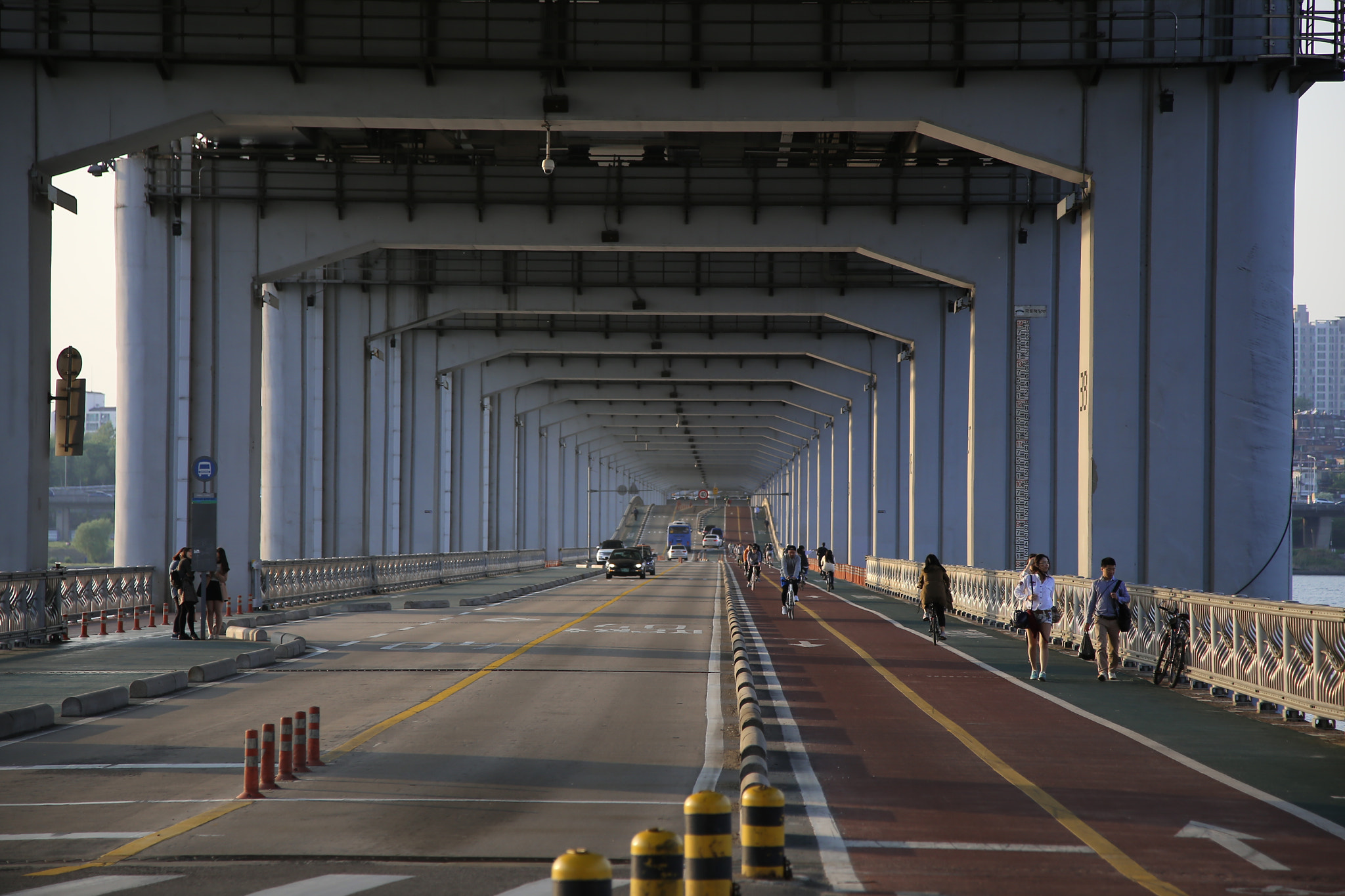
Banpo Hangang Park

Banpo Park (반포 한강공원) is located between Hannam Bridge, Dongjak Bridge and Banpo Bridge. It is 7.2 km in length, and the area of the park is 567,600m^{2}. It was part and the first result of the Han River Renaissance Project, one of the major policies of Oh Se-hoon, the mayor of Seoul.

=== Nanji Park ===
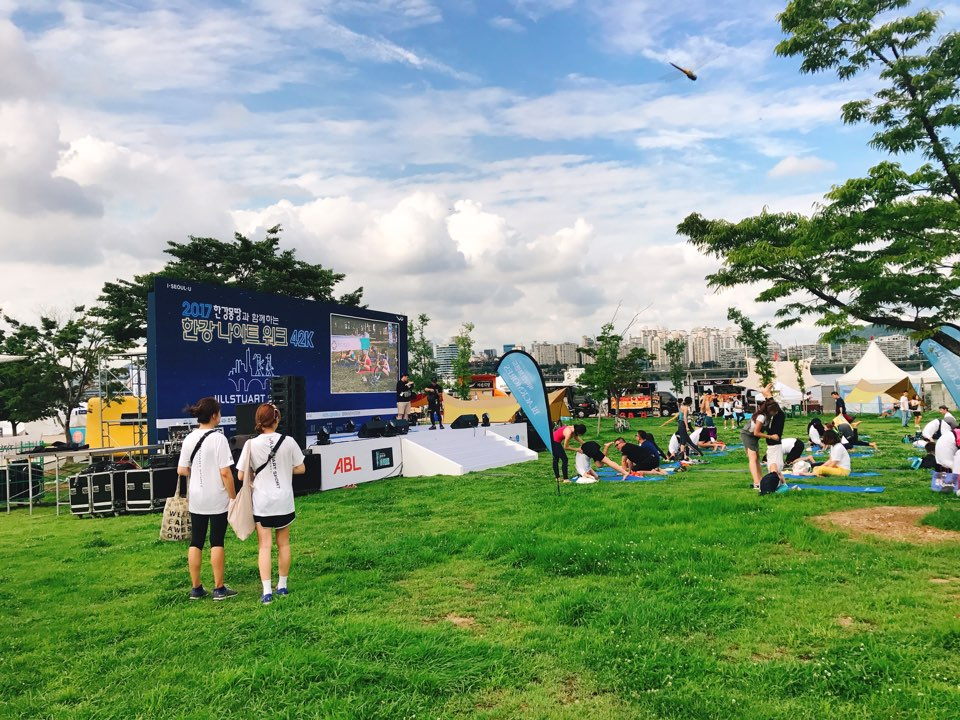
Hangang Park

Nanji Park (난지 한강공원) is located Sangam-dong in Mapo District, between Nanjicheon Bridge and Hongjecheon Bridge. It has a length of 4.02 km and an area of 776,000m^{2}. The park was one of five World Cup parks to commemorate the 2002 FIFA World Cup. It was built with the abolition of Najido Garbage centre which was a landfill site along the Han River. Later on, it was reconstructed as part of the Hangang Renaissance project, including an amusement park, a central connection bridge to the sky park, and a complex connection passage.

== Tourist attractions ==
=== Sebitseom ===
Sebitseom (세빛섬) is an artificial island created by Seoul Metropolitan Government in 2006 at the suggestion of Seoul citizen Kim Pun-sun, and it is located in Banpo Hangang Park.

=== Banpo Bridge ===
Banpo Bridge (반포대교) is a 6-lane bridge with a length of 1,490m and a width of 25m, connecting Seobinggo-dong in Yongsan District and Banpo-dong in Seocho District.

=== Saetgang ===
Saetgang (샛강) is the river between Yeouido and the mainland. In Saetgang, there is Saetgang Bridge, which looks like a crane.

=== Cafe of Light ===
The Cafe of Light is located close to Yeouinaru station with a panoramic view of the Hangang Park. Drinks are available for purchase.

== Activities ==
A variety of activities are conducted in the park throughout the year.

=== Swimming pools ===
There are seven swimming pools in Hangang Park. Nanji, Mangwon, Yeouido, Jamwon, Jamsil, Ttukseom and Gwangnaru pools usually opens during the third week of June to the first week of July. It is open from 9:00 to 19:00 and can avoid heat on the closest swimming pool in Seoul. There are adult pools, waterfalls and kid pools for children with very low water depths, and LED fountains can be found in several swimming pools. There is an aqua ring and a water slide, and tourists can enjoy the summer vacation as if they are in huge water parks.

=== Winter activities ===
In Hangang Park, snow sleds are opened in Yeouido. It is open every day of the week and throughout the year. It is open from 9:00 to 17:00, and does not open from 12:00 to 1:00 to spread the snows again. In addition, in 2015, mini-bikes, bumper cars and electric bicycles were newly constructed to meet the needs of children. Also, there are many other activities such as smelt catching and bungee jumping.

=== Other ===
There are aquatic resources in the Han River, so fishing is possible except for the prohibited areas. Anyone can do fishing without complying with the prohibition-related laws. Many water sports can be undertaken on the Han River including water skiing, motorboats, yachts and pleasure boats, and can be undertaken in most of the Han River parks.

== Programs and festivals ==
=== Hangang Spring Flower Festival ===
The Hangang Spring Flower Festival (한강봄꽃축제), also referred to as Yeouido Spring Flower Festival (여의도봄꽃축제), is held in 'Yeoui West Street' (여의서로) in Yeongdeungpo District, Seoul, usually in early April, when cherry blossoms are in full bloom. The cherry blossom trees line Yunjuro Road for about 6 km. Other flowers such as spireas, azaleas, and forsythias bloom as well. Special events are prepared in the Hangang Spring Flower Festival.

=== Fireworks festival ===
The Seoul International Fireworks Festival (서울세계불꽃축제) is an event which shows fireworks in Seoul by Hanwha company. Different countries participate in this event every year.

=== Hangang Summer Festival ===
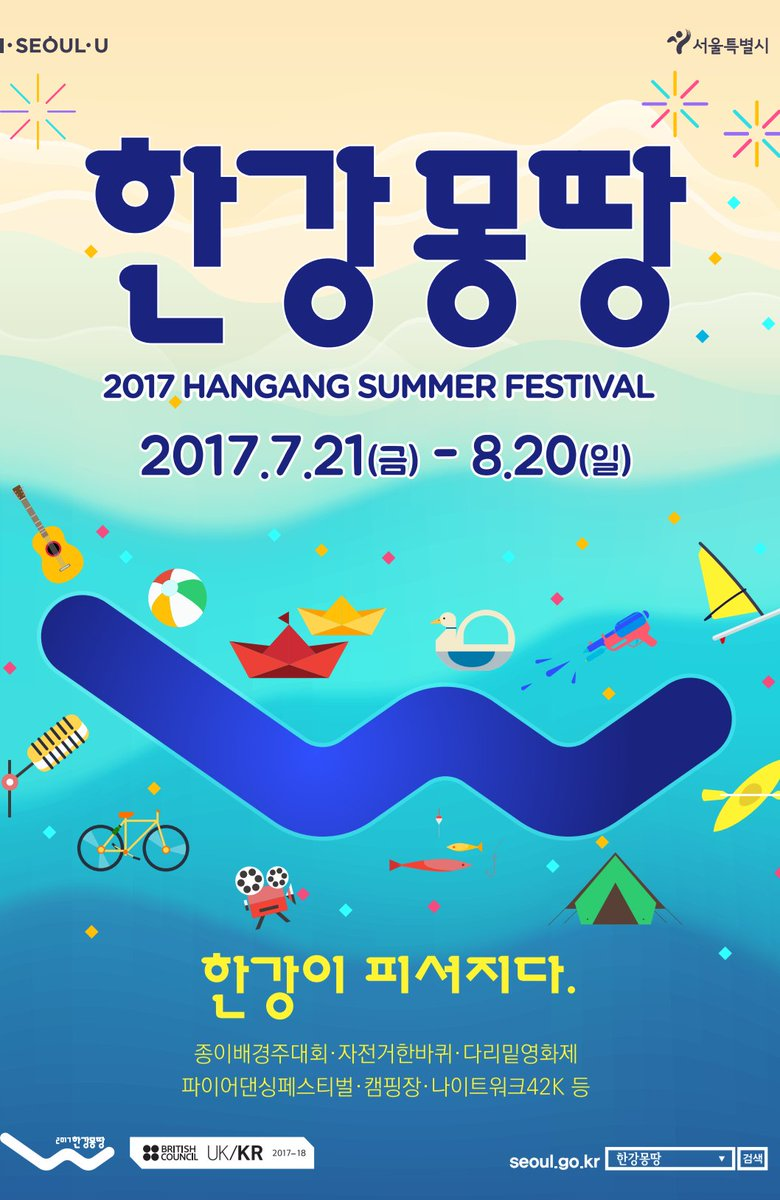
The poster of Hangang summer festival 2017

The Hangang Summer Festival (한강몽땅여름축제) is held annually in the summer. Water-based activities, a circus, and other experiences are provided. In 2017, about 80 programs were held in the Hangang Summer Festival.

== Efforts to preserve Hangang Park ==
For the purpose of preserving Hangang Park, Seoul manages an Ecological Landscape Conservation Area, Ecological Park, and Fish Roads.

=== Ecological Landscape Conservation Area ===
In Hangang Park, Godeok-dong, Bamseom, and Amsa-dong are designated as Ecological Landscape Conservation Areas.

=== Ecological Park ===
In Hangang Park, the Yeouido creek, Gangseo wetland, Godeok riverside, Nanji wetland, and the Amsa waterfront are designated as Ecological Parks.

==== Amsa waterfront ====
There is an Amsa waterfront (암사둔치) area in the park. The artificial shore and bicycle road of the Amsa-dong riverside was demolished, and an ecological park with wildflowers, walking trails, a community of reeds and mussels was created to expand the habitat of livings and to improve the view of the scene.

== Gallery ==
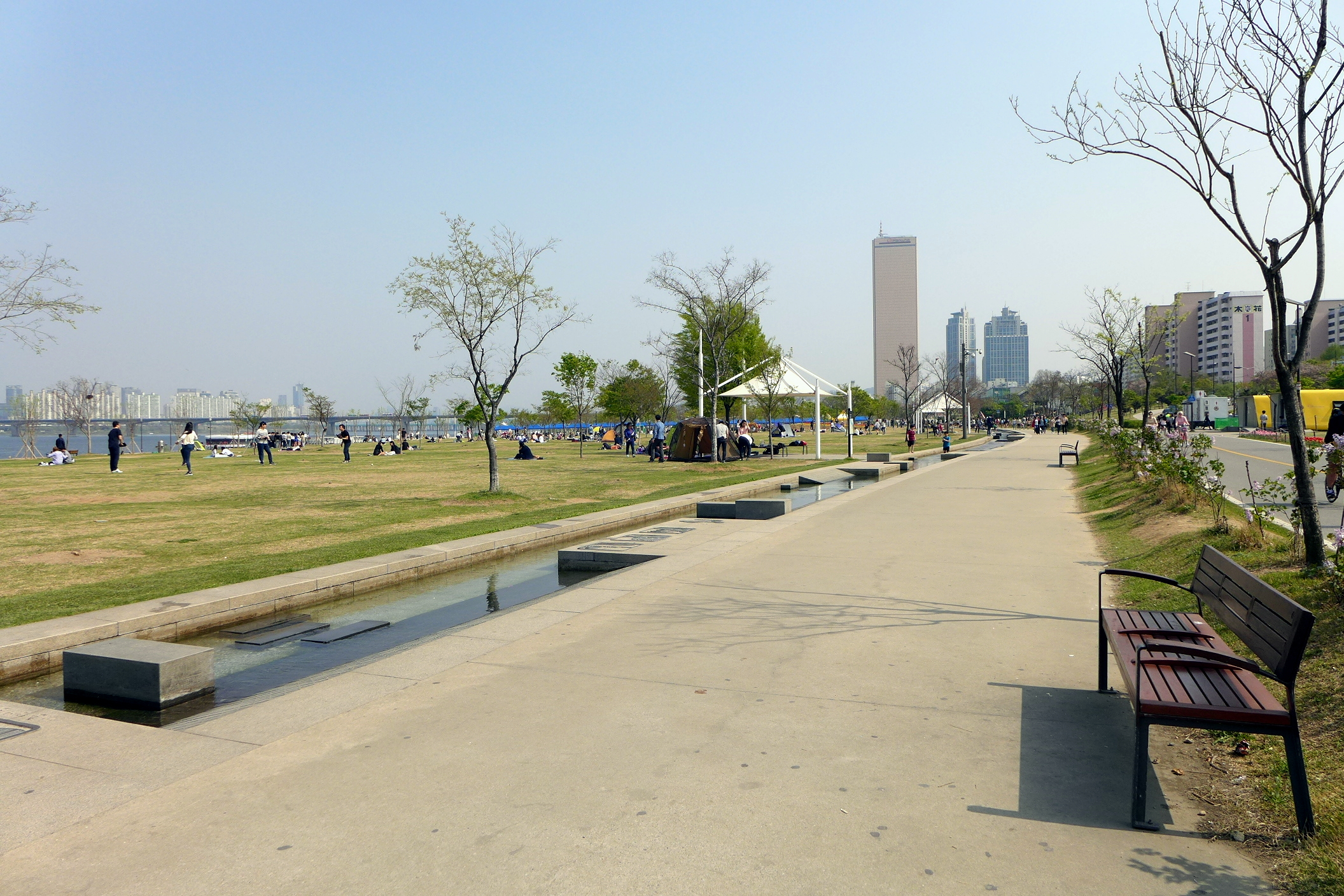
Lawn and water feature in Yeouido Hangang Park

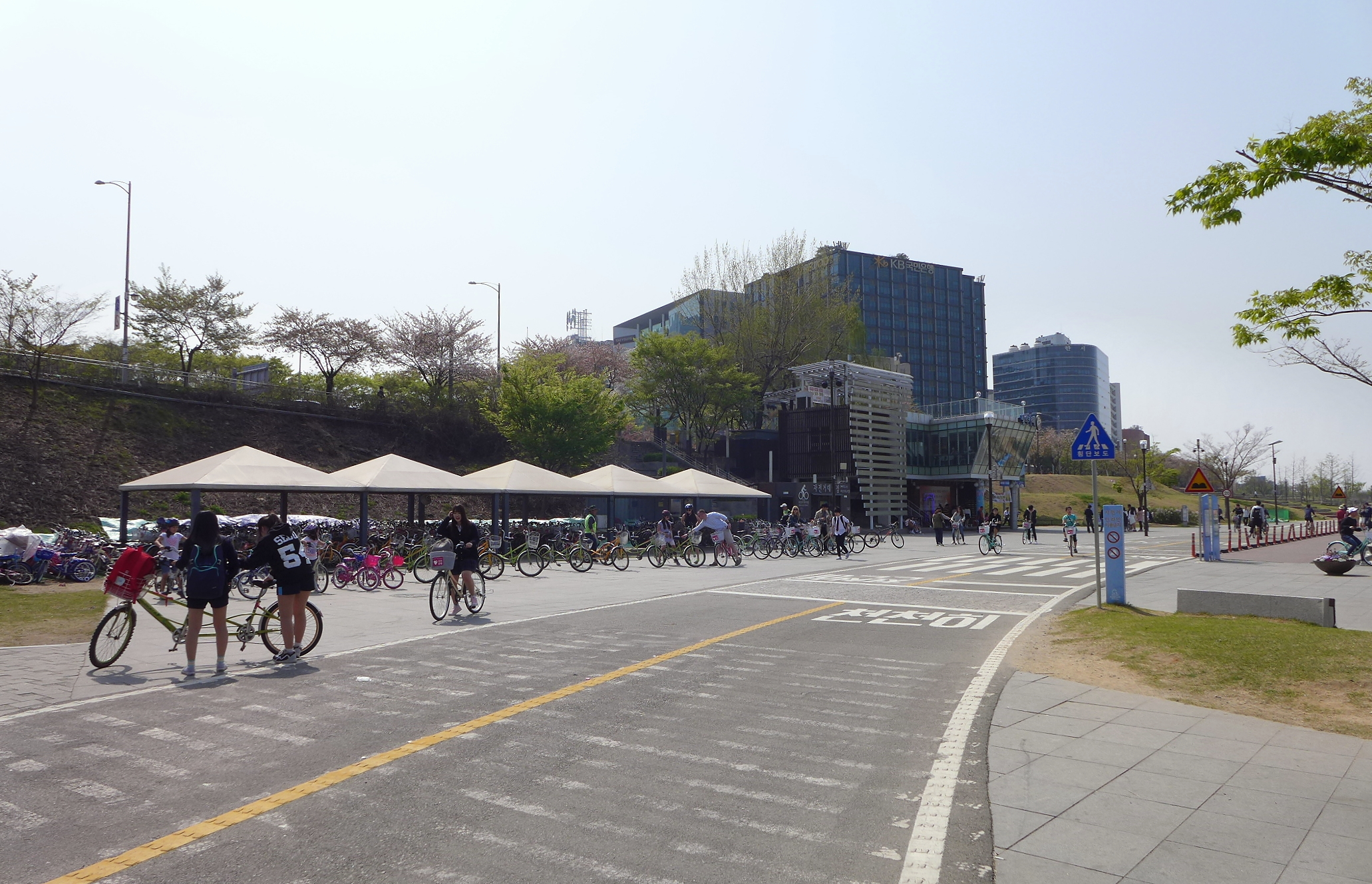
Cycling Path and restaurant in Yeouido Hangang Park

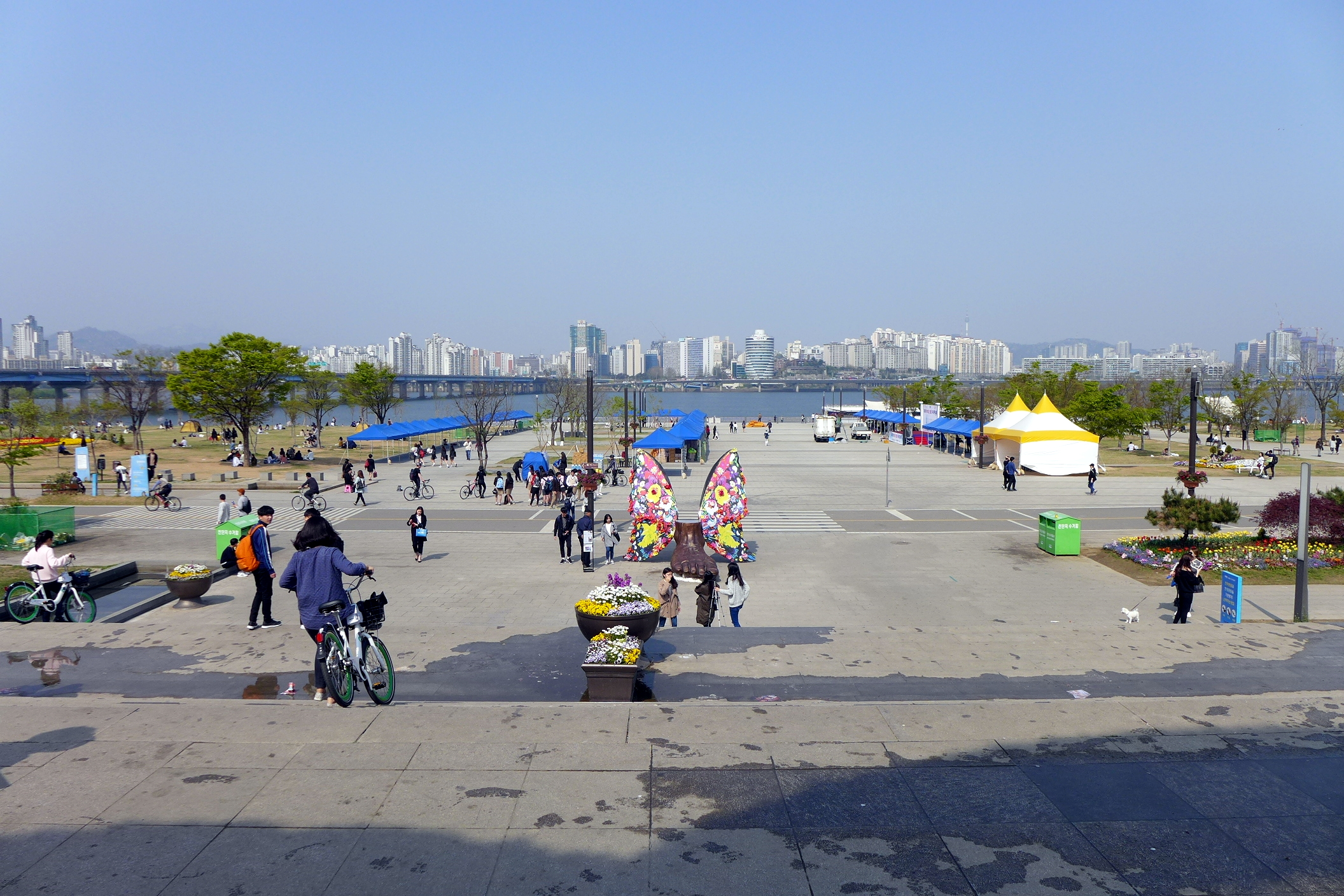
Plaza in Yeouido Hangang Park
