= List of accolades received by The Host (2006 film) =

The Host accolades
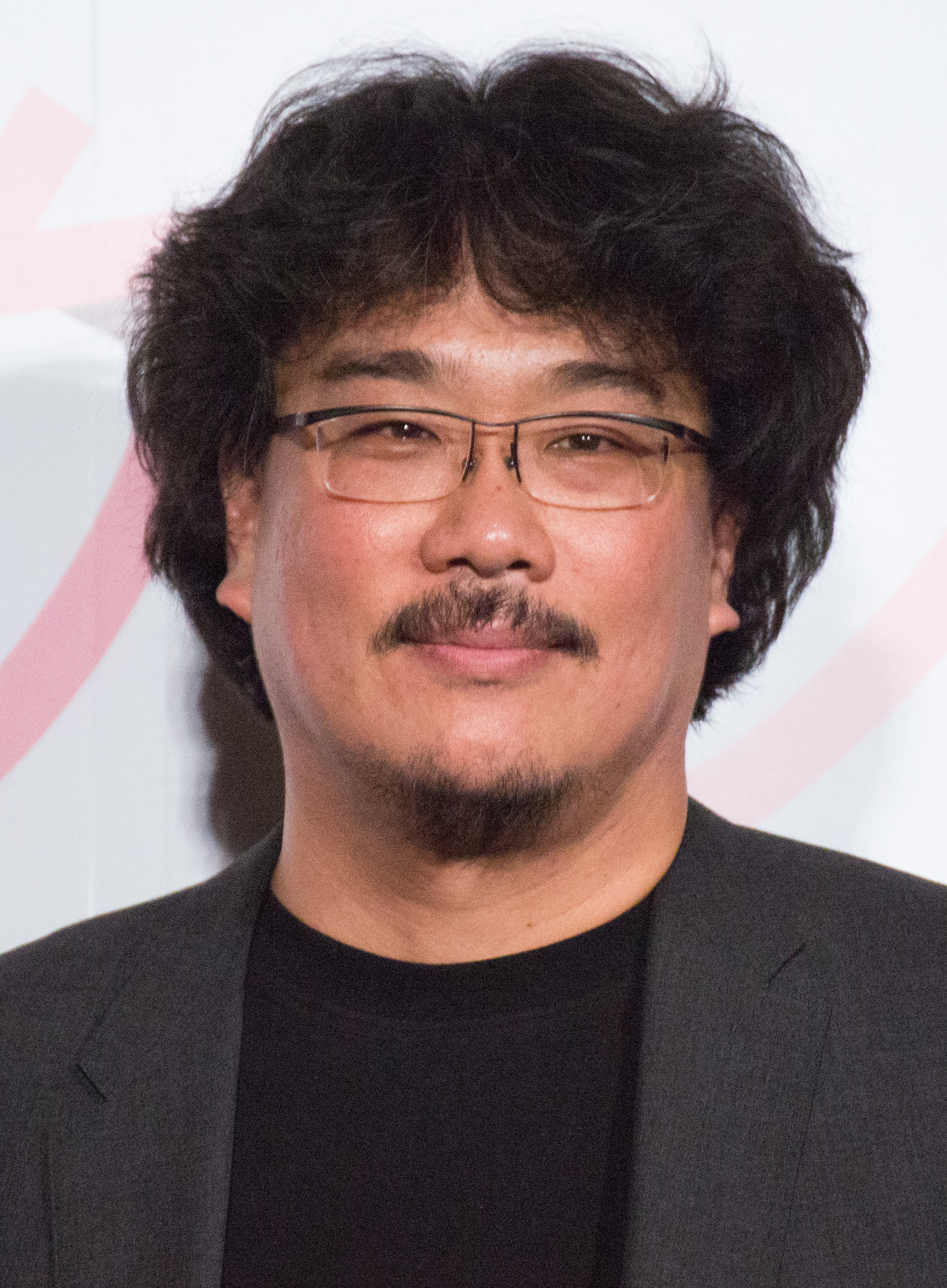
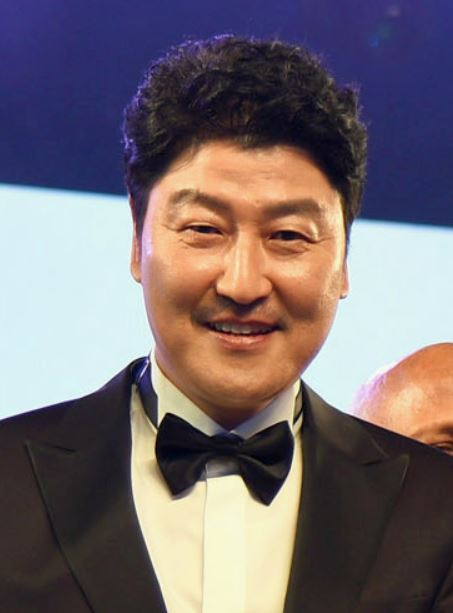
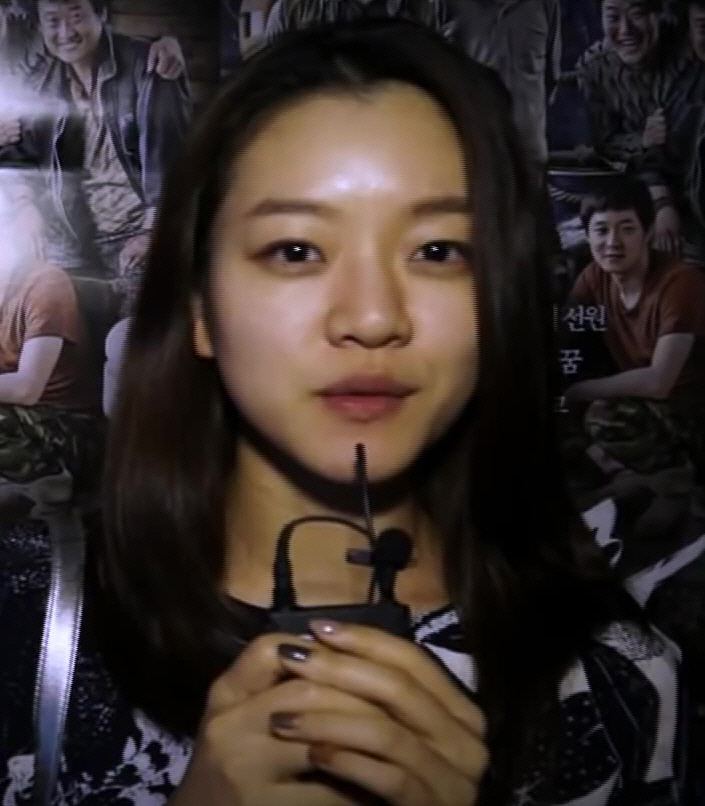
- Bong Joon-ho received multiple accolades for his direction, as did Song Kang-ho and Go Ah-sung for their performances
Awards and nominations
Award	Wins	Nominations

Totals (Note: Certain award groups do not simply award one winner. They acknowledge several different recipients, have runners-up, and have third place. Since this is a specific recognition and is different from losing an award, runner-up mentions are considered wins in this award tally. For simplification and to avoid errors, each award in this list has been presumed to have had a prior nomination.)
- Wins: 32
- Nominations: 55

The Host (Note: Korean: 괴물; RR: Gwoemul; lit. 'Monster') is a 2006 monster horror film directed by Bong Joon-ho, who co-wrote the script with Ha Jun-weon and Baek Cheol-hyeon. The film focuses on a vendor, Park Gang-du (Song Kang-ho), who attempts to save his daughter, Hyun-seo (Go Ah-sung), from a creature dwelling in the Han River that has abducted her. Byun Hee-bong, Park Hae-il, and Bae Doona, portray Gang-du's father, brother, and sister respectively.

The Host premiered at the 2006 Cannes Film Festival in May 2006, to critical acclaim. It was distributed in South Korea by Showbox on July 27 and in Japan by Kadokawa Herald on September 2; theatrical releases throughout the rest of the world lasted until 2008. The Host grossed roughly $90 million worldwide, becoming the highest-grossing South Korea film ever on its release. Rotten Tomatoes, a review aggregator, surveyed 156 reviews and judged 93% to be positive.

The film garnered nominations in various categories, particularly for Bong's direction and screenwriting as well as the lead acting performances. At the 1st Asian Film Awards in March 2007, it became the first film to win the Asian Film Award for Best Film; Song also won the Asian Film Award for Best Actor. The film received five of its nine nominations at the 5th Korean Film Awards, including Best Film and Best Director. Among its awards from Western ceremonies, and critics' organizations, and festivals, The Host was nominated for the Saturn Award for Best International Film and the Belgian Film Critics Association's Grand Prix.

== Accolades ==
List of accolades received by The Host
Award	Date of Ceremony	Category	Recipients	Result	Ref(s)
51st Asia Pacific Film Festival	2006	Best Supporting Actor	Byun Hee-bong	Won	
51st Asia Pacific Film Festival	2006	Best Editing	Kim Sun-min	Won	
51st Asia Pacific Film Festival	2006	Best Sound Effects	Choi Tae-young	Won	
1st Asian Film Awards	March 2007	Best Film	The Host	Won	
1st Asian Film Awards	March 2007	Best Actor	Song Kang-ho	Won	
1st Asian Film Awards	March 2007	Best Cinematographer	Kim Hyung-koo	Won	
1st Asian Film Awards	March 2007	Best Visual Effects	The Orphanage	Won	
1st Asian Film Awards	March 2007	Best Editing	Kim Sun-min	Nominated	
43rd Baeksang Arts Awards	April 25, 2007	Best Film	The Host	Won	
43rd Baeksang Arts Awards	April 25, 2007	Best Actor	Byun Hee-bong	Nominated	
43rd Baeksang Arts Awards	April 25, 2007	Best New Actress	Go Ah-sung	Nominated	
Belgian Film Critics Association	2008	Grand Prix	The Host	Nominated	
27th Blue Dragon Film Awards	December 15, 2006	Best Film	The Host	Won	
27th Blue Dragon Film Awards	December 15, 2006	Best Director	Bong Joon-ho	Nominated	
27th Blue Dragon Film Awards	December 15, 2006	Best Screenplay	Bong Joon-ho	Nominated	
27th Blue Dragon Film Awards	December 15, 2006	Best Actor	Song Kang-ho	Nominated	
27th Blue Dragon Film Awards	December 15, 2006	Best Supporting Actor	Byun Hee-bong	Won	
27th Blue Dragon Film Awards	December 15, 2006	Best Supporting Actress	Bae Doona	Nominated	
27th Blue Dragon Film Awards	December 15, 2006	Best New Actress	Go Ah-sung	Won	
27th Blue Dragon Film Awards	December 15, 2006	Best Cinematography	Kim Hyung-koo	Nominated	
27th Blue Dragon Film Awards	December 15, 2006	Best Lighting	Lee Kang-san, Jung Young-min	Won	
27th Blue Dragon Film Awards	December 15, 2006	Technical Award	The Orphanage	Won	
27th Blue Dragon Film Awards	December 15, 2006	Audience Choice Award for Most Popular Film	The Host	Won	
Brussels International Fantastic Film Festival	2007	Golden Raven	The Host	Won	
Busan Film Critics Awards	2006	Special Jury Prize	Bong Joon-ho	Won	
Chunsa Film Art Awards	2006	Planning and Production Award	Choi Yong-bae	Won	
Chunsa Film Art Awards	2006	Best Lighting	Lee Kang-san	Won	
Chunsa Film Art Awards	2006	Technical Award	The Host	Won	
9th Director's Cut Awards	2006	Best Producer	Choi Yong-bae	Won	
9th Director's Cut Awards	2006	Best Actor	Song Kang-ho, Byun Hee-bong, Park Hae-il	Won	
9th Director's Cut Awards	2006	Best Actress	Bae Doona, Go Ah-sung	Won	
30th Golden Cinematography Awards	2007	Best Actor	Song Kang-ho	Won	
44th Grand Bell Awards	June 8, 2007	Best Film	The Host	Nominated	
44th Grand Bell Awards	June 8, 2007	Best Director	Bong Joon-ho	Won	
44th Grand Bell Awards	June 8, 2007	Best Actor	Song Kang-ho	Nominated	
44th Grand Bell Awards	June 8, 2007	Best Supporting Actor	Byun Hee-bong	Nominated	
44th Grand Bell Awards	June 8, 2007	Best Supporting Actress	Go Ah-sung	Nominated	
44th Grand Bell Awards	June 8, 2007	Best Cinematography	Kim Hyung-koo	Nominated	
44th Grand Bell Awards	June 8, 2007	Best Editing	Kim Sun-min	Won	
44th Grand Bell Awards	June 8, 2007	Best Lighting	Lee Kang-san, Jung Young-min	Nominated	
44th Grand Bell Awards	June 8, 2007	Best Visual Effects	The Orphanage	Nominated	
44th Grand Bell Awards	June 8, 2007	Best Sound Effects	Lee Seung-chul, Choi Tae-young	Nominated	
44th Grand Bell Awards	June 8, 2007	Best Planning	Choi Yong-bae	Nominated	
5th Korean Film Awards	2006	Best Film	The Host	Won	
5th Korean Film Awards	2006	Best Director	Bong Joon-ho	Won	
5th Korean Film Awards	2006	Best Supporting Actress	Go Ah-sung	Nominated	
5th Korean Film Awards	2006	Best Cinematography	Kim Hyung-koo	Won	
5th Korean Film Awards	2006	Best Lighting	Lee Kang-san, Jung Young-min	Won	
5th Korean Film Awards	2006	Best Visual Effects	The Orphanage, EON	Won	
5th Korean Film Awards	2006	Best Sound	Choi Tae-young	Won	
5th Korean Film Awards	2006	Best Art Direction	Ryu Seong-hui	Nominated	
5th Korean Film Awards	2006	Best Score	Lee Byung-woo	Nominated	
33rd Saturn Awards	May 10, 2007	Best International Film	The Host	Nominated	
33rd Saturn Awards	May 10, 2007	Best Young Actor/Actress	Go Ah-sung	Nominated	
