= McFarland incident =

2000 illegal dumping in South Korea

- Native name: 맥팔랜드 사건
- Date: February 9, 2000
- Location: Yongsan Garrison, Seoul, South Korea
- Convicted: Albert L. McFarland
- Sentence: Six months imprisonment

The McFarland incident (Korean: 맥팔랜드 사건) was an illegal toxic waste dumping that occurred on February 9, 2000 under the orders of Albert L. McFarland, an American civilian employed by the United States military in South Korea. An estimated 24 gallons of formaldehyde were disposed of into the Han River near Seoul by McFarland's mortuary assistant.

== Incident ==
On February 9, 2000, Albert L. McFarland, a 58-year-old American civilian working as the deputy chief of a U.S. mortuary at the Yongsan Garrison in Seoul, ordered his assistant to dispose of 480 bottles into a drain leading to the Han River because they were collecting dust. The bottles contained a corpse preservative consisting of formaldehyde and methanol. McFarland's assistant, Mr. Kim, initially refused to carry out such a task, telling McFarland that "We cannot dump formaldehyde into the Han River because it is the main source of drinking water for Seoul and could cause cancer and birth defects". McFarland reportedly verbally abused Kim, replying: "Are you an idiot? Do as I say." Kim eventually obeyed, and subsequently went on sick leave for three weeks due to nausea and headaches resulting from disposing the chemicals.

== Aftermath ==
Kim reported the incident to McFarland's superiors at United States Forces Korea, but they dismissed the case, telling him that "there is no problem if you dilute it in water". Upon hearing about the incident and the U.S. military's dismissal of it, Korean workers on the base were infuriated. On July 13, 2000, Green Korea United, an environmental activist group, hosted a press conference publicizing the event, which they referred to as "The US 8th Army's Poisonous Discharge into the Han River" and provided reporters with photographic evidence taken during the disposal. When media outlets reported the incident, the general public of South Korea was outraged and demanded McFarland be punished and the U.S. military, who they held accountable, issue an official apology. Protesters gathered outside of USAG Yongsan, the headquarters of USFK in South Korea, demanding Thomas A. Schwartz, the head of the United States Army Forces Command, be removed from his position. McFarland was eventually found guilty of the toxic waste dumping; he was imprisoned for six months in 2005 and suspended from working for two years.

The incident later gained further fame for inspiring Bong Joon-ho to make the monster movie The Host (2006): Bong stated that "Like Godzilla was created due to the nuclear bomb in Hiroshima, my monster was motivated from the McFarland scandal". The film's opening scene is a recreation of the incident with Scott Wilson playing a character based on McFarland; in the film, the toxic waste results in the creation of a monster in the Han River. McFarland was still an employee at the U.S. base when The Host was released in July 2006.
