= Banpo Bridge =

Bridge in Seoul, South Korea

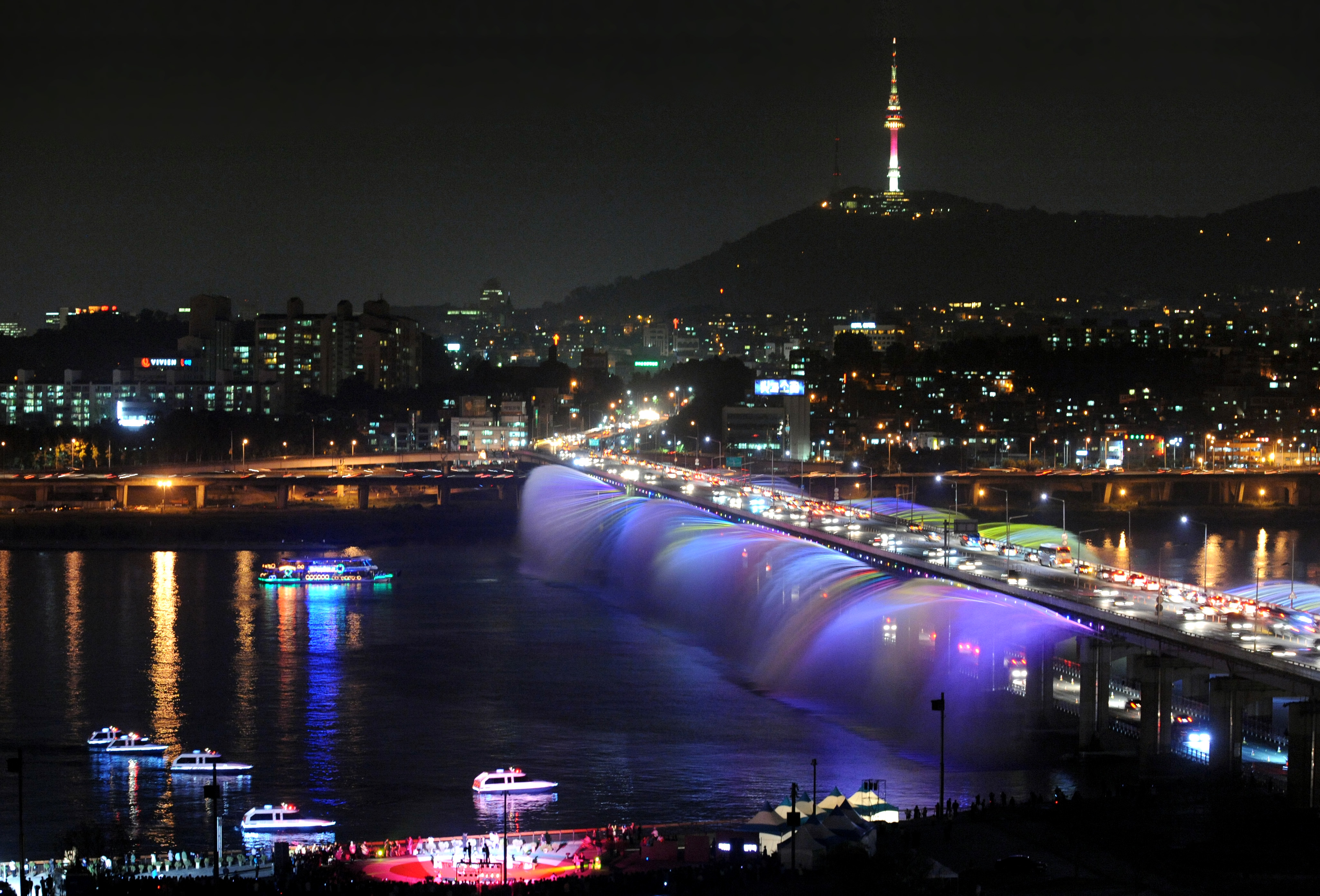
- A Moonlight Rainbow Fountain light show at the bridge (2008)
- Coordinates: 37.5155°N 126.9960°E
- Crosses: Han River
- Locale: Seoul, South Korea
- Maintained by: Seoul Metropolitan Hangang Project Headquarters
- Preceded by: Hannam Bridge
- Followed by: Dongjak Bridge

Characteristics
- Total length: 1,495 m (4,905 ft)
- Width: 25 m (82 ft)

History
- Engineering design by: Dae Han Consultants Company, Ltd.
- Constructed by: Byucksan Engineering & Construction Company, Ltd.
- Construction start: January 11, 1980
- Construction end: June 25, 1982
- Construction cost: ₩21,500,000,000

Statistics
- Daily traffic: 103,925 (2009)

Seoul Future Heritage
- Reference no.: 2013-106

Korean name
- Hangul: 반포대교
- Hanja: 盤浦大橋
- RR: Banpo daegyo
- MR: Panp'o taegyo

Location
- Interactive map of Banpo Bridge

The Banpo Bridge (Korean: 반포대교) is a major bridge for vehicular traffic over the Han River in central Seoul, South Korea. It is a double-decked bridge, and is above the pedestrian Jamsu Bridge.

The bridge is a popular tourist attraction, and is known for its daily Moonlight Rainbow Fountain and light shows between April and October. As of 2026, the bridge holds the Guinness World Record for longest fountain bridge in the world. It is centrally located in Seoul, and accessible via public transportation.

== Description ==
The bridge is situated over the Han River, and connects Seobinggo-dong in Yongsan District with Banpo-dong in Seocho District. It is 25 m (82 ft) wide and 1,495 m (4,905 ft) long.

The bridge is intended for vehicular traffic. It is the first double deck bridge built in South Korea. It is also a major landmark of the city and attracts both locals and tourists.

=== Moonlight Rainbow Fountain ===
Since April 2009, the bridge has had a fountain off its west side called Moonlight Rainbow Fountain (달빛무지개분수). On November 7, 2008, the bridge was awarded the Guinness World Record for longest fountain bridge in the world. The bridge has 38 water pumps and 380 nozzles installed. It also has speakers, lights, and projectors.

Five to six times per day from April to October, the fountain has a 20-minute water and light show. This occurs only if there is good weather. It has projectors that can display images on the water. The show is set to music that includes various popular South Korean and international songs. The set list is available online. Additionally, Banpo Hangang Park organizes the "Moonlight Square Cultural Weekend" every Saturday from 7:00 to 8:30 p.m. between May and October. This event showcases a range of musical genres, including classical music with commentary, a cappella, popera, jazz, brass bands, and orchestras.

=== Jamsu Bridge ===
Beneath Banpo Bridge is the pedestrian Jamsu Bridge. It is 18 m (59 ft) wide and 795 m (2,608 ft) long. During periods of high rainfall, the Jamsu Bridge is designed to submerge as the water level of the river rises, as the lower deck lies close to the waterline.

It often hosts cultural events such as a yearly fall market with live music and food trucks.

== History ==
The lower Jamsu Bridge was completed in 1979, before Banpo Bridge. Banpo Bridge began construction on August 11, 1980, and was completed in November 1982. Its construction cost was ~~W~~21.5 billion won. Its construction was intended to reduce traffic load on the Hangang Bridge.

Jamsu Bridge was made into an elevated arch shape in 1986, in order to accommodate tourist cruise ships passing underneath it.

The bridge went under repairs from December 30, 1994, to June 30, 1996. It underwent more repairs from December 1998 to 2002. From October 2003 and 2005, it was repaved.

== Gallery ==
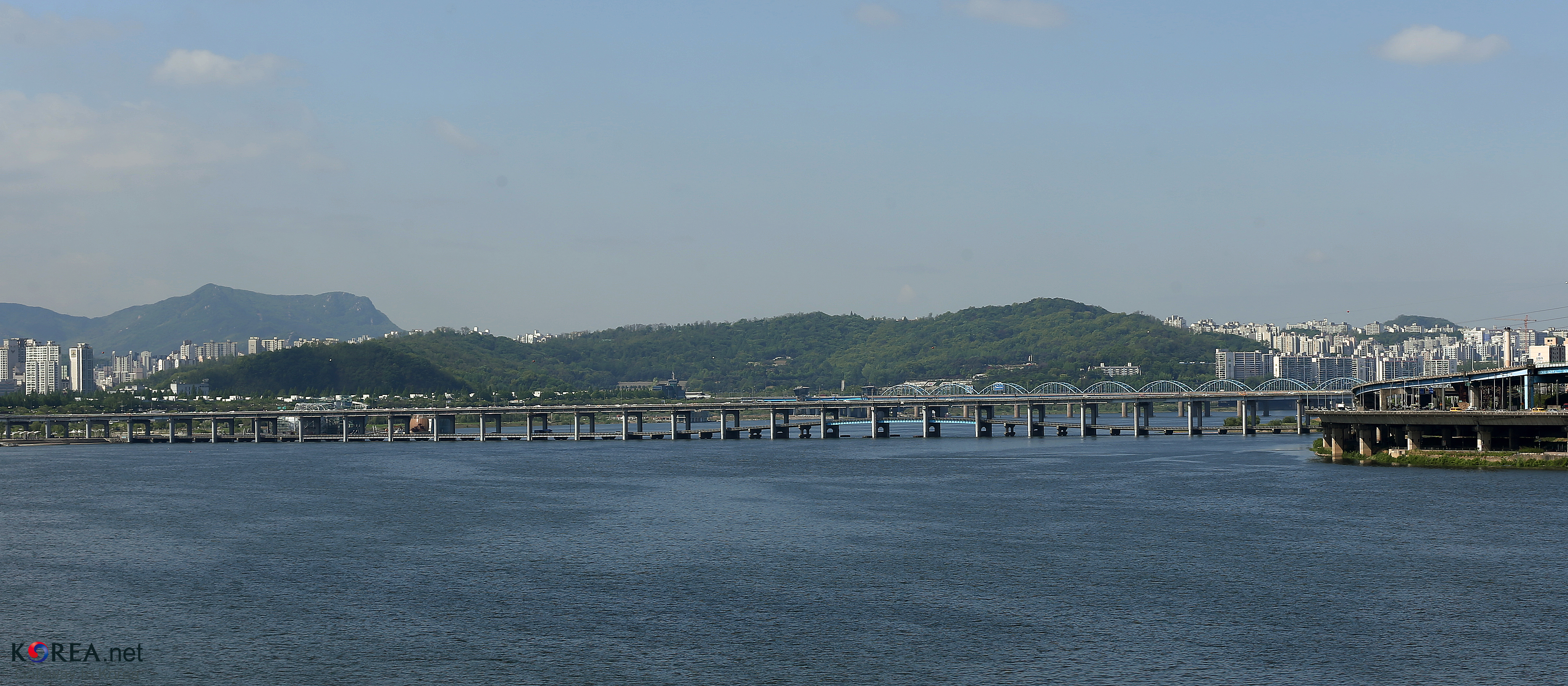
View from the side of the bridge (2014)

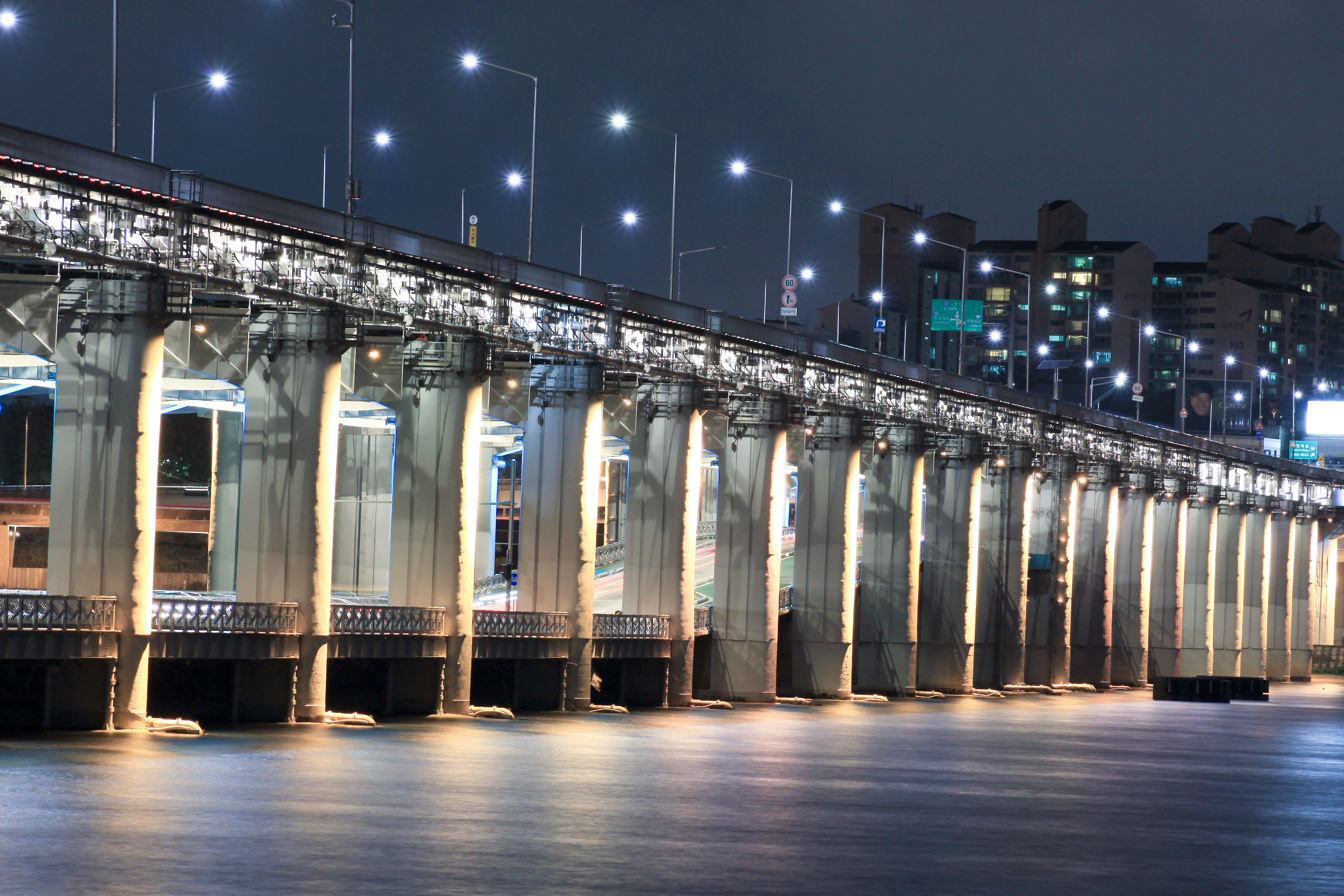
View of the bridge from the water at night (2009)
