= Kim Jung-man =

South Korean photographer (1954–2022)

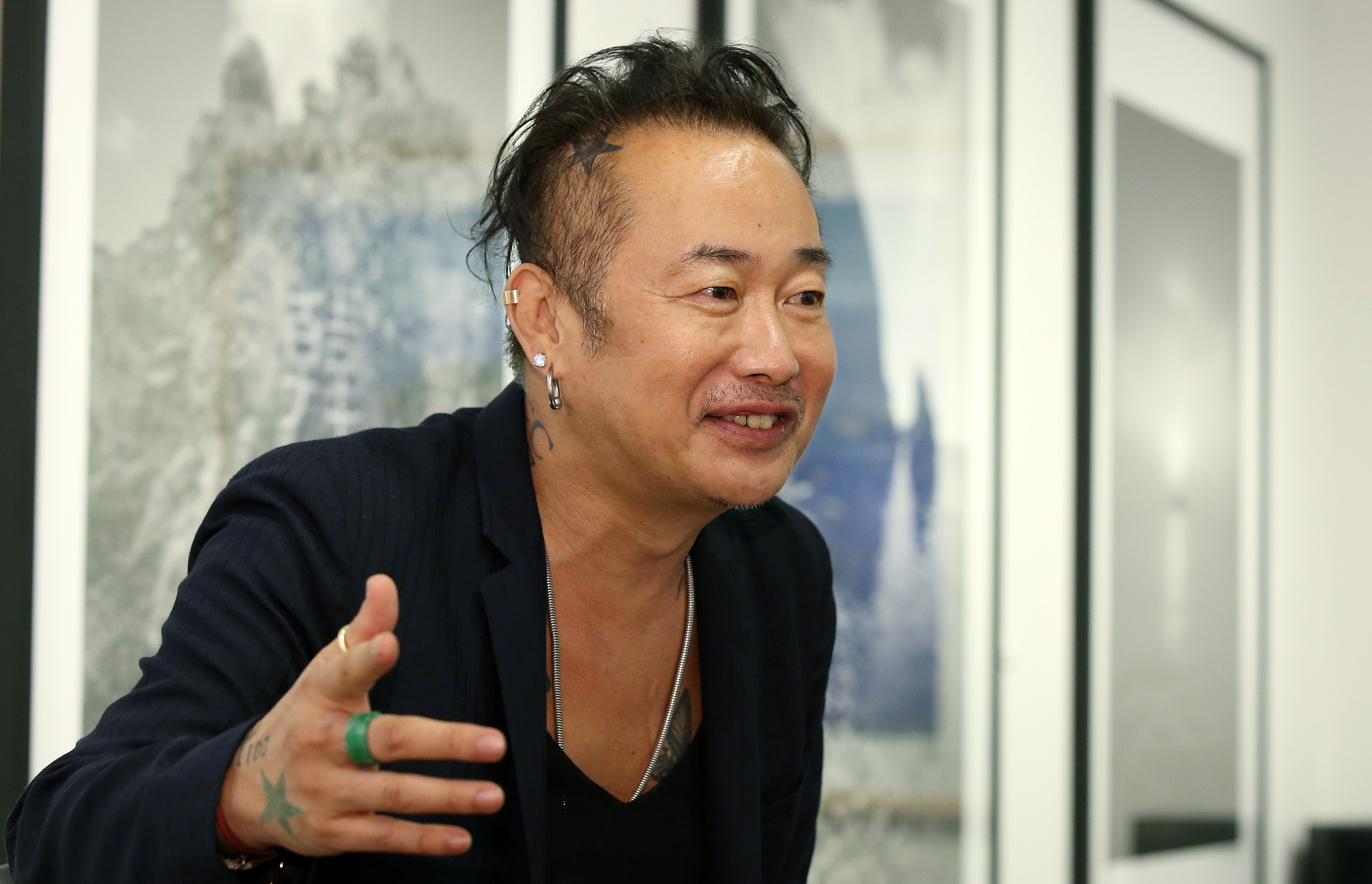
- Born: 30 October 1954; Cheorwon County, South Korea
- Died: 31 December 2022 (aged 68)
- Occupation: Photographer

Korean name
- Hangul: 김중만
- Hanja: 金重晩
- RR: Gim Jungman
- MR: Kim Chungman

Kim Jung-man (30 October 1954 – 31 December 2022) was a South Korean photographer.

== Biography ==
Kim first left Korea as a teenager following his father, a government doctor dispatched to Burkina Faso. He later went to Europe to study fine art painting, and became interested in photography while attending École Nationale Supérieure des Arts Décoratifs in France.

In 1979, Kim won the "Best Young Photographer Award" at the Arles International Photography Festival. The same year, he was named one of "Today's 80 Photographers in France," the youngest on the list. He eventually moved back to Korea, and worked in commercial photography in the 1980s and 1990s. In 2000, he was selected one of "33 Men of Culture of Korea" by korea.com and awarded Fashion Photographer of the Year.

=== Korea ===
In 2006, Kim Jung Man reoriented his career, devoting himself to artistic experimentation. He wished to explore a Korean and Asian identity, on a thematic as well as technical level, for example by printing photographs on hanji or Korean paper.

=== Death ===
Kim died of pneumonia on 31 December 2022, at the age of 68.
