= Hannam Bridge =

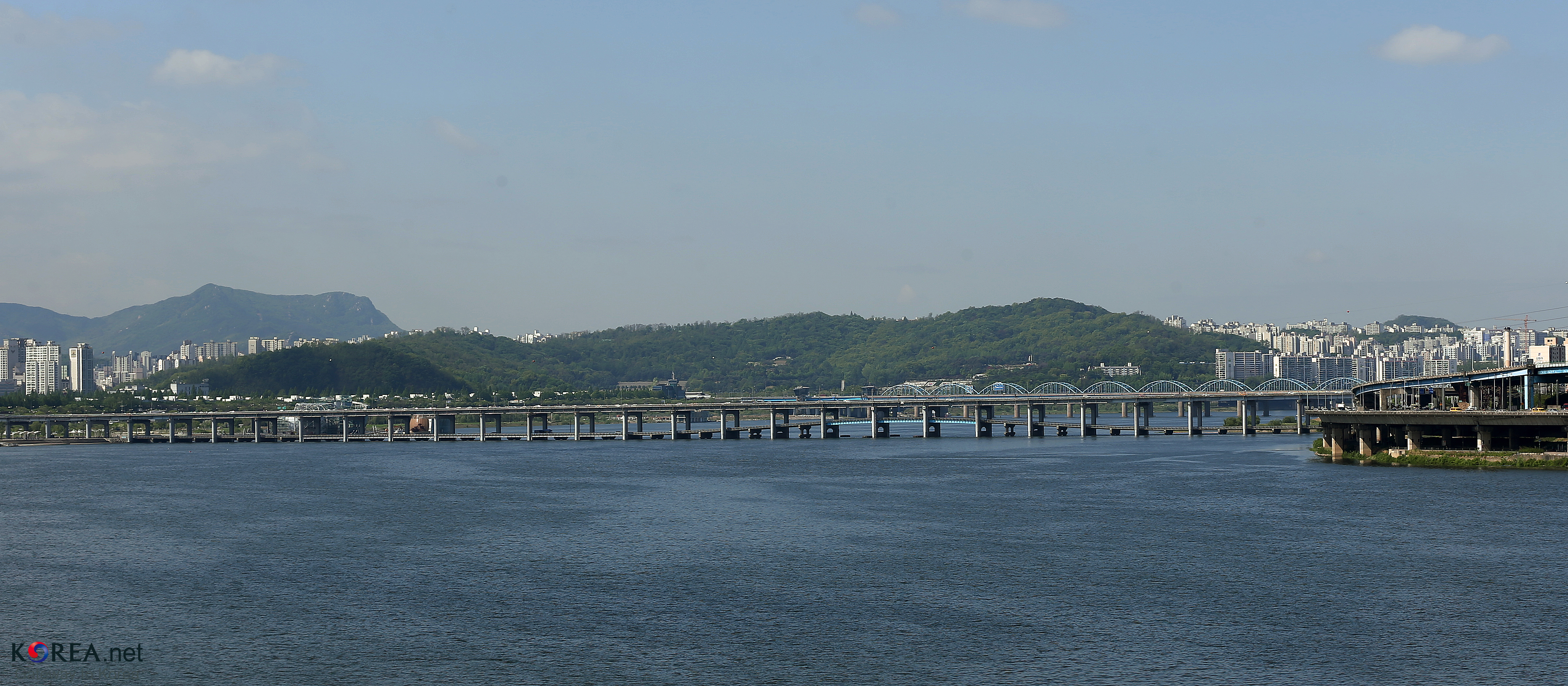
- April 2014.
- Coordinates: 37°31′38″N 127°00′47″E
- Crosses: Han River
- Locale: Seoul, South Korea
- Official name: Hannam Grand Bridge
- Other name: Jesamhanganggyo
- Preceded by: Dongho Bridge
- Followed by: Banpo Bridge

Characteristics
- Total length: 919 m (3,015 ft)
- Width: 52 m (171 ft)

History
- Constructed by: Hyundai Engineering & Construction
- Construction start: January 19, 1966
- Construction end: December 25, 1969
- Construction cost: ₩1,113,000,000

Statistics
- Daily traffic: 216,980 (2007)

Seoul Future Heritage
- Reference no.: 2013-276

Korean name
- Hangul: 한남대교
- Hanja: 漢南大橋
- RR: Hannam daegyo
- MR: Hannam taegyo

Location
- Interactive map of Hannam Bridge

The Hannam Bridge (Korean: 한남대교), formerly known as the Third Hangang Bridge, is a girder bridge over the Han River, South Korea. It connects Sinsa-dong, Gangnam District and Hannam-dong, Yongsan District. The bridge is heavily congested with traffic, with both gu being busy business districts. It was called the Hangang Bridge No. 3 (Jesamhanganggyo; 제3한강교) until 1985, when its name was changed to the current name. A trot song "Jesamhanggyo" was popularized by Hye Eun-Yi in 1979. The bridge was originally built to expedite the evacuation of Seoul residents during a potential attack by North Korea.

It is a part of the Asian Highway Network AH1.
