= Wonhyo Bridge =

Bridge in Seoul, South Korea

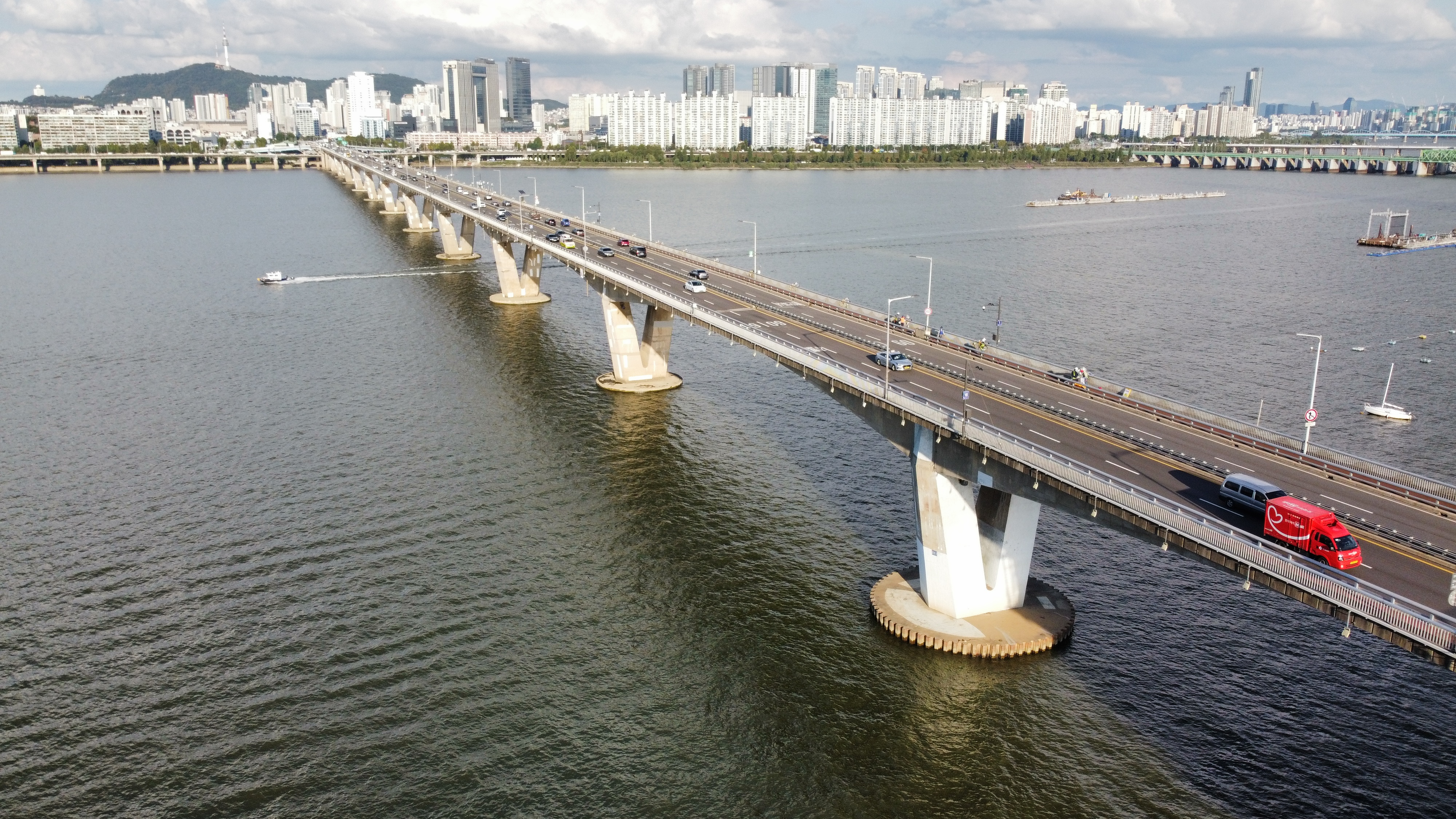
- The bridge (2022)
- Coordinates: 37°31′38″N 126°56′46″E

Statistics

Seoul Future Heritage
- Reference no.: 2013-203

Korean name
- Hangul: 원효대교
- Hanja: 元曉大橋
- RR: Wonhyo daegyo
- MR: Wŏnhyo taegyo

Location
- Interactive map of Wonhyo Bridge

The Wonhyo Bridge (Korean: 원효대교) crosses the Han River in South Korea and connects the districts of Yongsan District and Yeongdeungpo District. The bridge was completed in 1981 (45 years ago). It was the 13th to be built on the Han River.

== History ==
Construction started on the bridge on July 17, 1978. The bridge opened on October 27, 1981. On December 10, 1981, toll fees were introduced. The toll fees were controversial; Wonhyo Bridge was the only bridge to have tolls at that time, so vehicles avoided using it, which defeated the purpose of the bridge. On February 1, 1983, Dongah Construction donated the bridge to Seoul Metropolitan City. After the ownership change, the tolls (and toll gates) were removed.

== In popular culture ==
Wonhyo Bridge was selected as the set for a fighting scene included in the 2006 Korean film The Host directed by Bong Joon-ho. In the movie, Wonhyo Bridge was where the creature was hiding, and where the daughter of the main character was kidnapped. The reason for selecting this location was that it fitted well with the film's concept of a sewer under a bridge, and the external appearance of Wonhyo Bridge is more dynamic than other bridges, and this added tension.

== Gallery ==
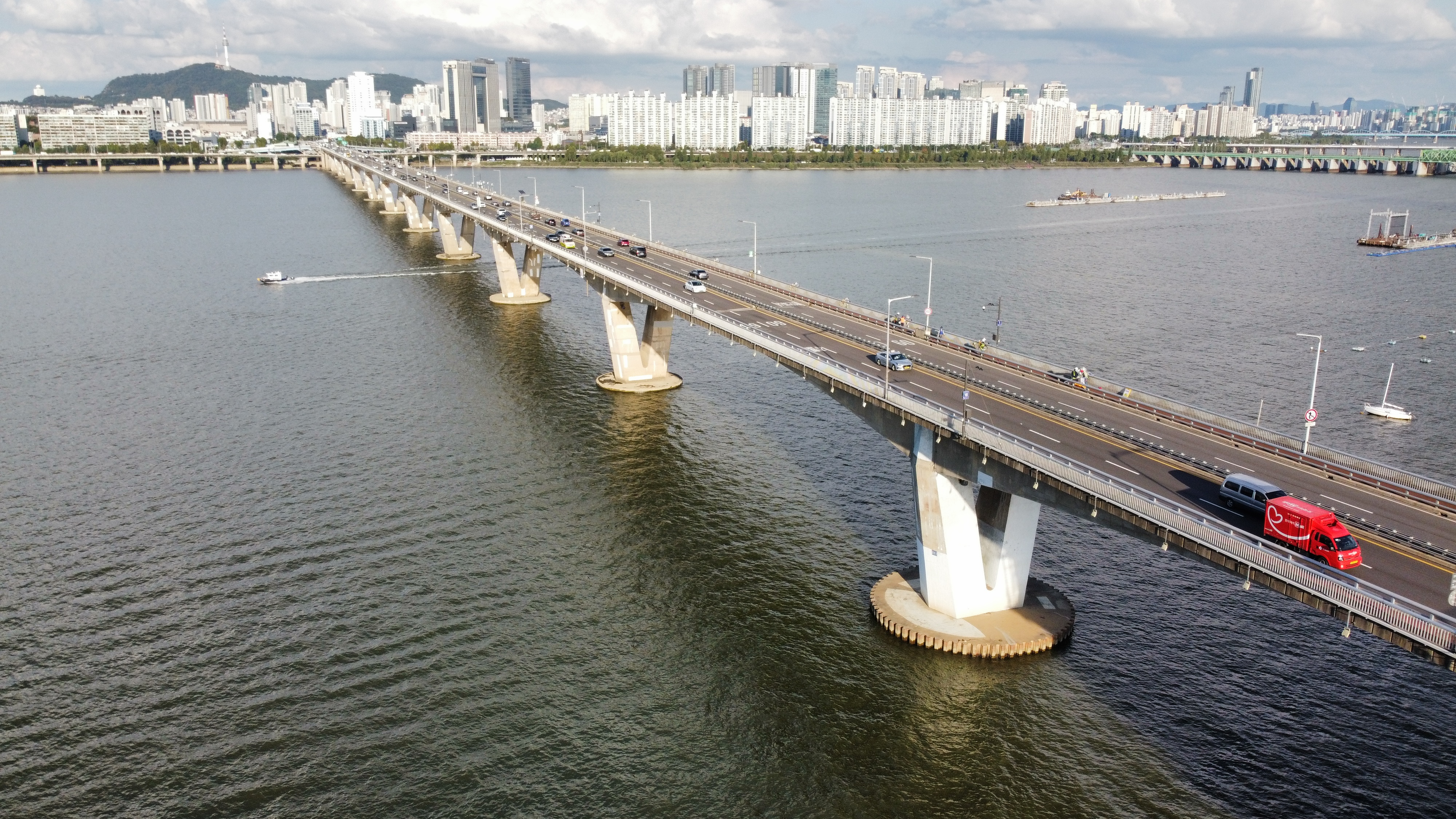

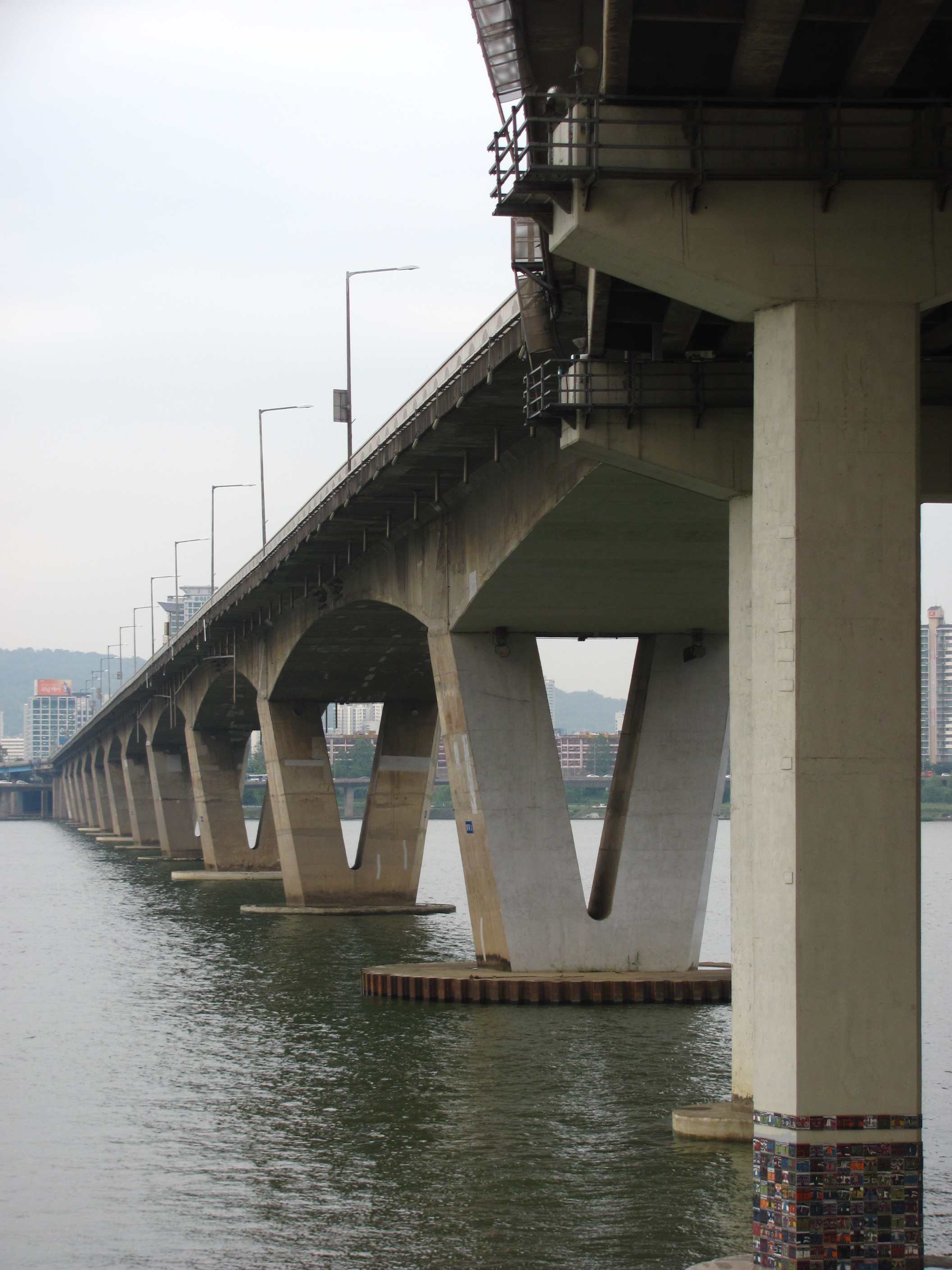

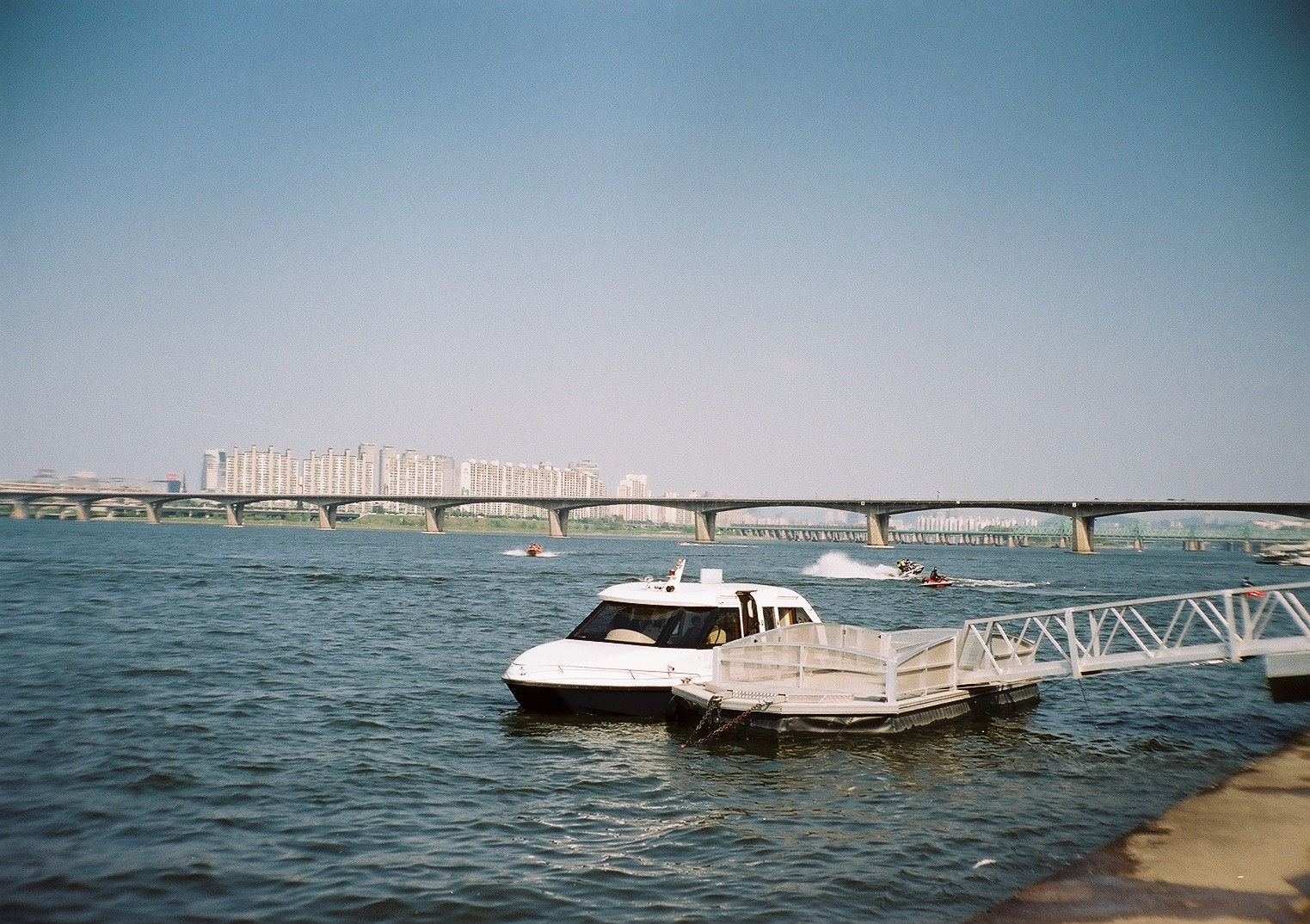
