= Jamsil Bridge =

Road bridge in Seoul, South Korea

Coordinates: 37.5246°N 127.0916°E

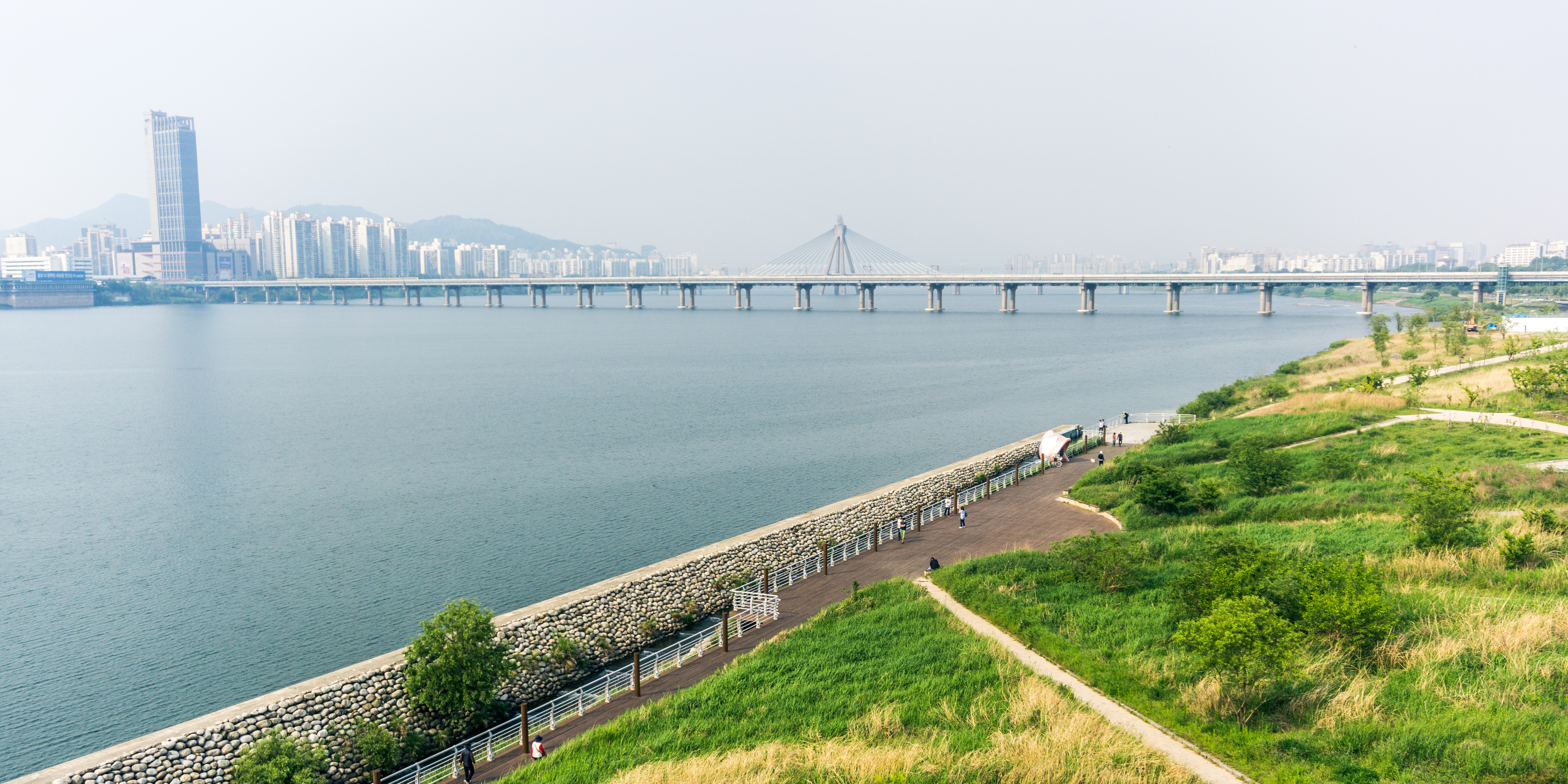
- Han River and Han River Park from Jamsil Bridge

Korean name
- Hangul: 잠실대교
- Hanja: 蠶室大橋
- RR: Jamsil daegyo
- MR: Chamsil taegyo

The Jamsil Bridge (Korean: 잠실대교) crosses the Han River in South Korea and connects the districts of Songpa District and Gwangjin District. Completed in 1972, it is the 6th bridge to be constructed over the Han River.
