= Dongjak Bridge =

Bridge in Seoul, South Korea

Coordinates: 37.5112°N 126.9822°E

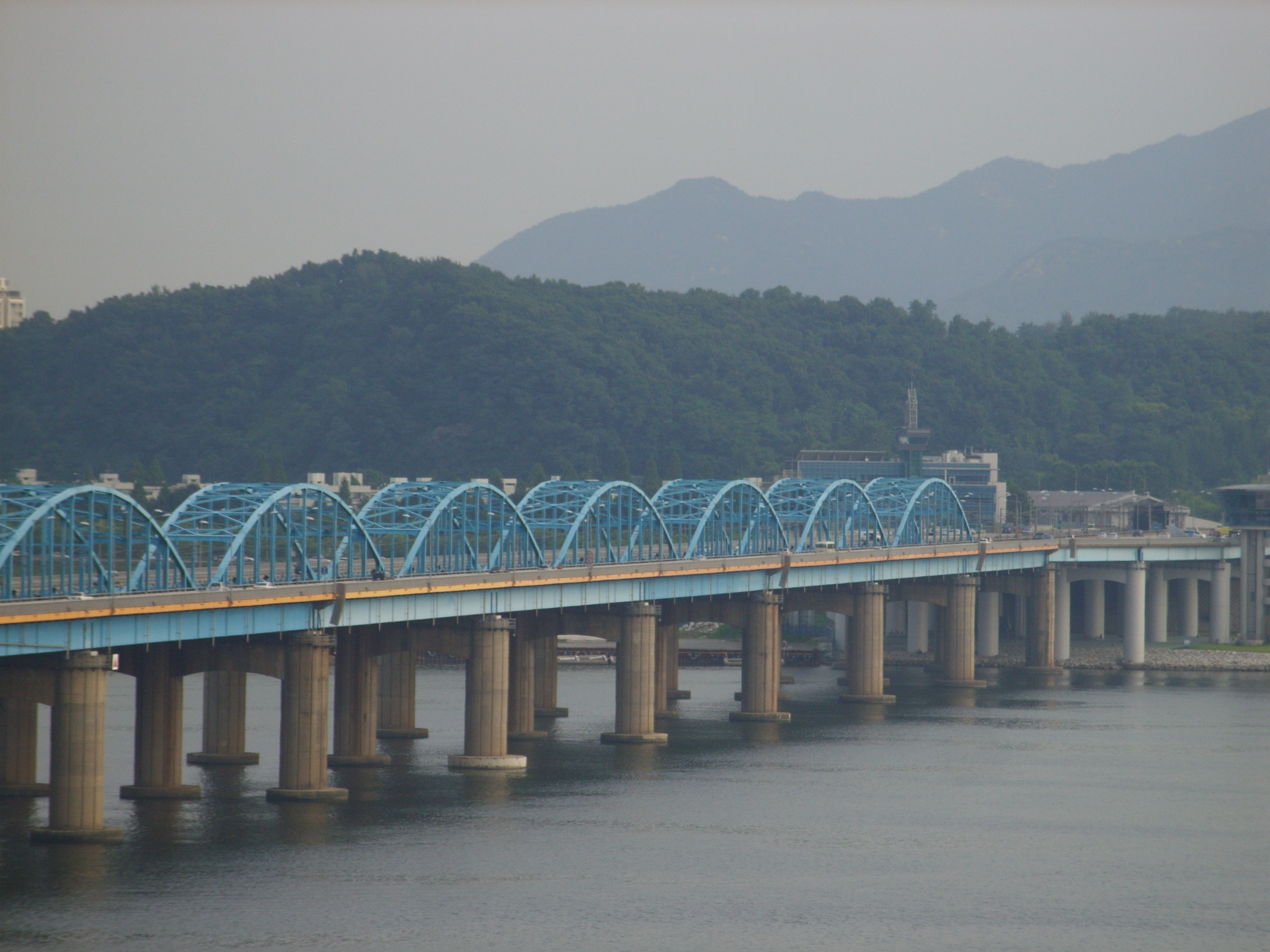

Korean name
- Hangul: 동작대교
- Hanja: 銅雀大橋
- RR: Dongjak daegyo
- MR: Tongjak taegyo

The Dongjak Bridge (Korean: 동작대교) is a bridge over the Han River in Seoul, South Korea. It carries road traffic across 6 lanes and Seoul Subway Line 4, and Dongjak Station is located at the southern end of this bridge. It is a blue truss bridge. It is the 11th bridge overall, and the fifth railroad bridge to be completed across the Han River. Dongjakdaegyo was completed on the same day as Donghodaegyo, which has a similar structure.

== History ==
Construction on Dongjak Bridge commenced on October 18, 1978, and Seoul Mayor Koo Ja-chun, Deputy Prime Minister Nam Duck-woo, and Minister of Construction Shin Hyong-sik participated in the groundbreaking ceremony. At the time of commencing construction, Dongjak Bridge was the first bridge in Korea to have the langer-arch design, and was scheduled to open in September 1981. The reason for using the langer-arch design for this bridge was because a steel plate was used instead of a concrete plate for reducing the bridge weight to allow the trains in Seoul Subway Line 4 to pass. At the time, the construction of Dongjak Bridge was carried out as construction of a civil investment method by the investment and construction delegated to Daewoo Development, similar to Wonhyo Bridge. Therefore, there was a plan to receive toll fares for a period of 20 years. At the time of construction, Dongjak Bridge was the widest bridge in South Korea.

Construction of the bridge started with the installation of the open caisson after an 8-month underwater operation, and the lower piers of the bridge were completed in May 1980. However, soon after the construction of the upper bridge structure began, Daewoo Development ran into issues regarding its internal funding and the rising cost of construction. The construction's responsibility was given over to Seoul City Government in 1981, and construction was suspended. In January 1982, the city government resumed the construction of the bridge, and the bridge was slated to open on September 1984, but the actual opening occurred on November 14, 1984. The opening ceremony of the bridge was attended by President Chun Doo-hwan, First Lady Lee Soon-ja, Minister of Construction Kim Sung-bae, and Seoul Mayor Yeom Bo-hyun.

- October 18, 1978: Construction started
- February 1980: Construction completion time extended to December 1981
- 1981: Construction suspended due to Daewoo Construction returning the construction project
- February 1982: Construction resumed
- December 1983: Construction completion time extended to the end of 1984
- February 1984: Announcement of plan to open in September with only six vehicle lanes
- November 14, 1984: Completed and opened

== Effect of the Bridge's Opening ==
With the opening of the bridge, the traffic of the neighboring Hangang Bridge and Banpo Bridge were expected to be reduced by 25-30%, and the time spent traveling from Seoul's city center to Government Complex Gwacheon reduced by 5-10 minutes.
