= Yongsan-dong =

Yongsan-dong can refer to several administrative wards in South Korean cities

- Yongsan-dong in Yongsan-gu, Seoul
- Yongsan-dong in Dong-gu, Gwangju
- Yongsan-dong in Yuseong-gu, Daejeon
- Yongsan-dong in Chungju, Chungcheongbuk-do
- Yongsan-dong in Naju, Jeollanam-do
