= Dongja-dong =

- Interactive map of Dongja-dong
- Coordinates: 37.552°N 126.972°E
- Country: South Korea

Area
  - Total: 0.28 km^{2} (0.11 sq mi)

Korean name
- Hangul: 동자동
- Hanja: 東子洞
- RR: Dongja-dong
- MR: Tongja-dong

Dongja-dong (Korean: 동자동) is a dong (neighborhood) of Yongsan District, Seoul, South Korea. It is a legal dong (법정동 法定洞) administered under its administrative dong (행정동 行政洞), Namyeong-dong.

== See also ==
- Administrative divisions of South Korea
