= Dongbinggo-dong =

- Interactive map of Dongbinggo-dong
- Country: South Korea

Area
  - Total: 0.40 km^{2} (0.15 sq mi)

Korean name
- Hangul: 동빙고동
- Hanja: 東氷庫洞
- RR: Dongbinggo-dong
- MR: Tongbinggo-dong

Dongbinggo-dong (Korean: 동빙고동) is a dong (neighborhood) of Yongsan District, Seoul, South Korea. It is a legal dong (법정동 法定洞) administered under its administrative dong (행정동 行政洞), Seobinggo-dong.

== See also ==
- Administrative divisions of South Korea
