= Turtle Chips =

South Korean snack food brand

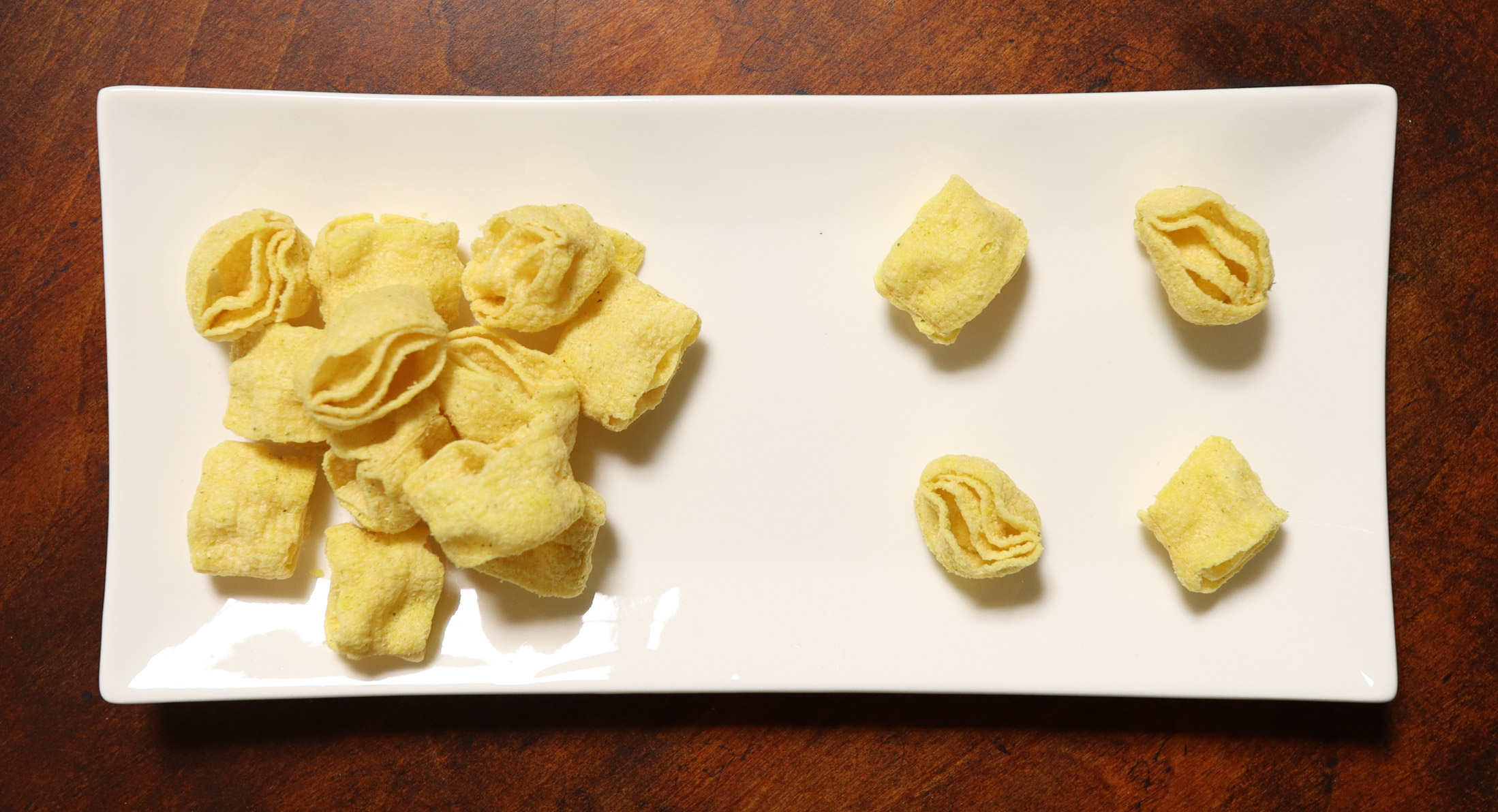
A plate of Turtle Chips

Turtle Chips (Korean: 꼬북칩; RR: Kkobuk chip) are a brand of chips that are made by South Korean snack company Orion. They get their name from their shape, which resembles the shell of a tortoise.

Turtle Chips has been a popular snack since its release in March 2017. According to Orion, the unique crispiness from the four thin chips overlapping each other took eight years to develop. In February 2019, Orion obtained a patent for its manufacturing facility that develops the four-layered plates, giving it exclusive rights for the next 20 years.

== Exports ==
In April 2023, Orion invested a total of 10 billion won ($7.6 million) to establish local production systems in Vietnam and India to release Turtle Chips in the respective markets. In Vietnam, the product name changed to "Masita" which translates to "delicious" in Korean (맛있다).

In India, the snack is sold as "Turtle Chips," following the same product name as exports to the United States, Australia, and the United Kingdom. Orion developed five new flavors for the Indian market—Mexican Lime, Sour Cream and Onion, Tangy Tomato, Masala, and Spicy Devil.

== Flavors ==
- Mexico Barbeque (China exclusive)
- Mexican Lime
- Sour Cream and Onion
- Tangy Tomato
- Masala
- Spicy Devil
- Caramel Popcorn
- Mexican Street Corn
- Korean Chicken
- Choco Churro* Cornsoup
- Truffle
- Carbonara Hot Chicken
- Flaming Lime
- Steak Wasabi
- Matcha Choco
- Mala
- Seaweed
- Sweetcorn
