= Dowon-dong =

Neighborhood of Seoul, South Korea

- Interactive map of Dowon-dong
- Country: South Korea

Korean name
- Hangul: 도원동
- Hanja: 桃園洞
- RR: Dowon-dong
- MR: Towŏn-dong

Dowon-dong (Korean: 도원동) is a dong (neighborhood) of Yongsan District, Seoul, South Korea. It is a legal dong (법정동 法定洞) administered under its administrative dong (행정동 行政洞), Yongmun-dong.

== See also ==
- Administrative divisions of South Korea
