= Sinchang-dong =

Sinchang-dong may refer to several places in South Korea:

- Sinchang-dong, Seoul
- Sinchang-dong, Busan, site of Gukje Market
- Sinchang-dong, Gwangju, a neighborhood in South Korea
