= Singye =

Singye may refer to:

- Singye County, North Hwanghae Province, North Korea
  - Singye Station, railway station in the county
- Singye-dong, neighbourhood (dong) of Yongsan District, Seoul, South Korea

== See also ==
- Singye Dzong, town in Luentse District, Bhutan
- Singye Temple, Buddhist temple in Kosong County, Kangwon Province, North Korea
