= Munbae-dong =

- Interactive map of Munbae-dong
- Country: South Korea

Area
  - Total: 0.12 km^{2} (0.046 sq mi)

Korean name
- Hangul: 문배동
- Hanja: 文培洞
- RR: Munbae-dong
- MR: Munbae-dong

Munbae-dong (Korean: 문배동) is a dong (neighbourhood) of Yongsan District, Seoul, South Korea. It is a legal dong (법정동 法定洞) administered under its administrative dong (행정동 行政洞), Hangangno 1-dong.

Orion Confectionery has its headquarters in Munbae-dong.

== See also ==
- Administrative divisions of South Korea
