= Juseong-dong =

- Interactive map of Juseong-dong
- Country: South Korea

Area
  - Total: 0.19 km^{2} (0.073 sq mi)

Korean name
- Hangul: 주성동
- Hanja: 鑄城洞
- RR: Juseong-dong
- MR: Chusŏng-dong

Juseong-dong (Korean: 주성동) is a dong (neighbourhood) of Yongsan District, Seoul, South Korea. It is a legal dong (법정동 法定洞) administered under its administrative dong (행정동 行政洞), Seobinggo-dong.

== See also ==
- Administrative divisions of South Korea
