= Bosung Girls' High School =

Coordinates: 37.54303°N 126.98425°E

Bosung Girls' High School 보성여자고등학교

Location
- 66 Sinheung-ro 3ga-gil, Yongsan-gu, Seoul; South Korea

Information
- Type: Private
- Established: 1907
- Principal: Nam Myung-hwal (남명활)
- Deputy Principal: Yoo Gi-ho (유기호)
- Faculty: 62
- Gender: Girls
- Website: www.bosung.hs.kr

Bosung Girls' High School (Korean: 보성여자고등학교) is a private girls high school located in Yongsan-dong, Yongsan District, Seoul.

== History ==
The school was founded on October 10, 1907, under the name Bosung Girls' School (보성여학교). The current principal Nam Myung-hwal was appointed on February 7, 2013, as the school's 15th principal.

== Notable alumni ==
- Park Mi-sun
- Choi Eun-hee
- Shim Hye-jin
