= Sancheon-dong =

- Interactive map of Sancheon-dong
- Country: South Korea

Area
  - Total: 0.1 km^{2} (0.039 sq mi)

Korean name
- Hangul: 산천동
- Hanja: 山泉洞
- RR: Sancheon-dong
- MR: Sanch'ŏn-dong

Sancheon-dong (Korean: 산천동) is a dong (neighbourhood) of Yongsan District, Seoul, South Korea. It is a legal dong (법정동 法定洞) administered under its administrative dong (행정동 行政洞), Wonhyoro 2-dong.

== See also ==
- Administrative divisions of South Korea
