= Huam-dong =

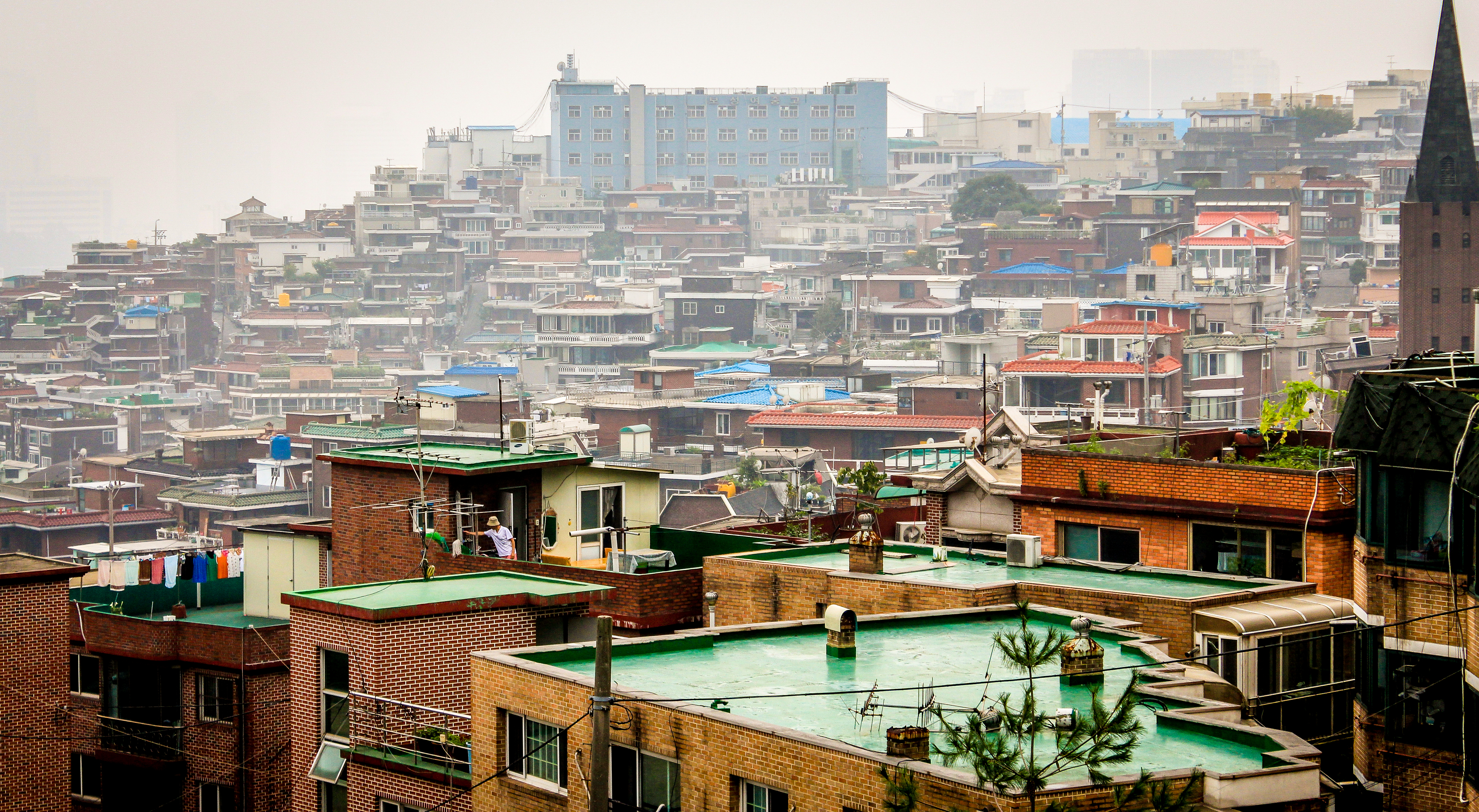

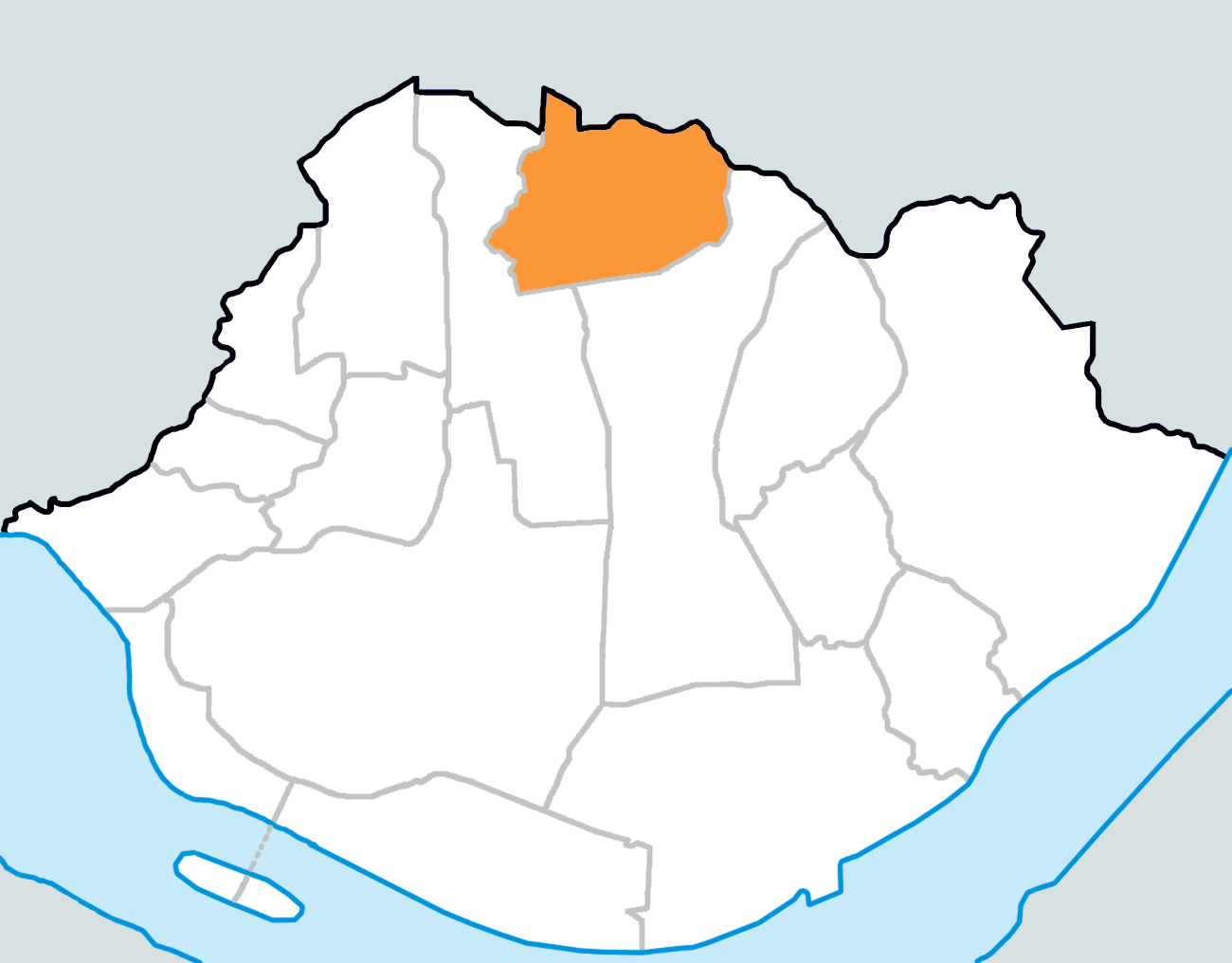
- Country: South Korea

Area
  - Total: 0.86 km^{2} (0.33 sq mi)

Population (2025)
  - Total: 15,730
  - Density: 18,000/km^{2} (47,000/sq mi)

Korean name
- Hangul: 후암동
- Hanja: 厚岩洞
- RR: Huam-dong
- MR: Huam-dong

Huam-dong (Korean: 후암동) is a dong (neighborhood) of Yongsan District, Seoul, South Korea.

== Etymology ==
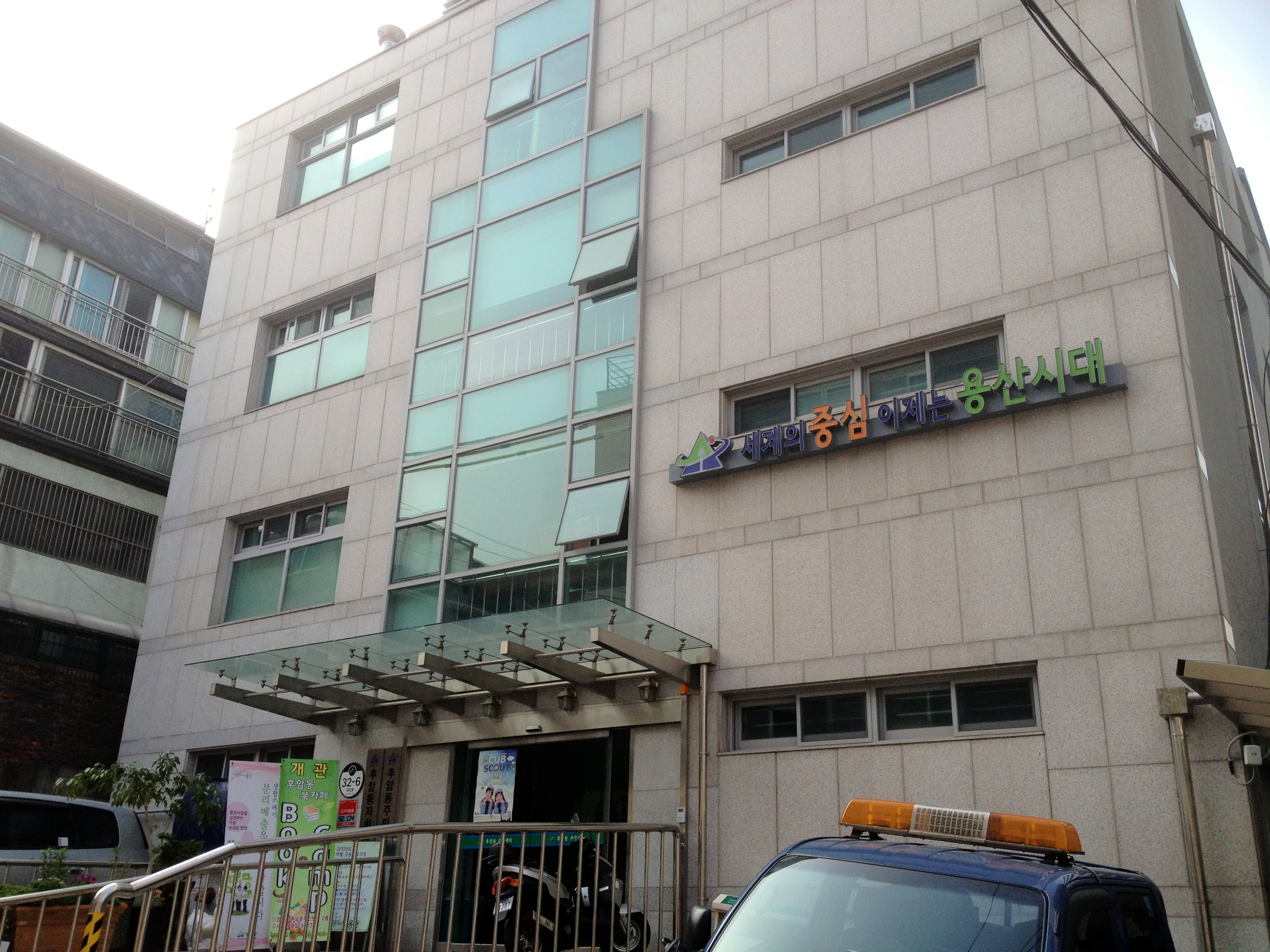
Huam-dong Community Service Center

The name of Huam-dong originates from a large round and thick rock called Dutubawi that used to exist in the village. This rock was a place where descendants of esteemed individuals would come to pray for offspring.

== Education ==
- Seoul Samkwang Elementary School
- Seoul Huam Elementary School

== See also ==
- Administrative divisions of South Korea
