= Bogwang-dong =

Coordinates: 37.526°N 127.000°E

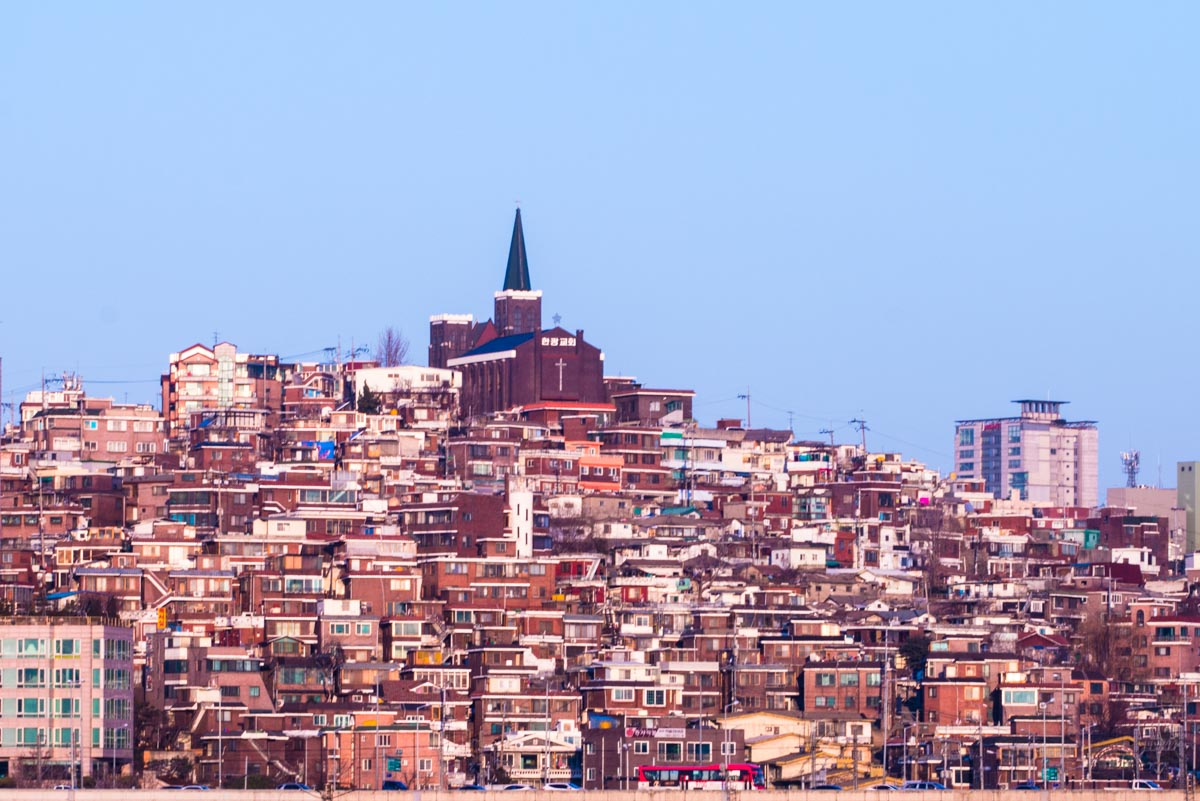
- Bongwang-dong from the Hannam Bridge before demolition

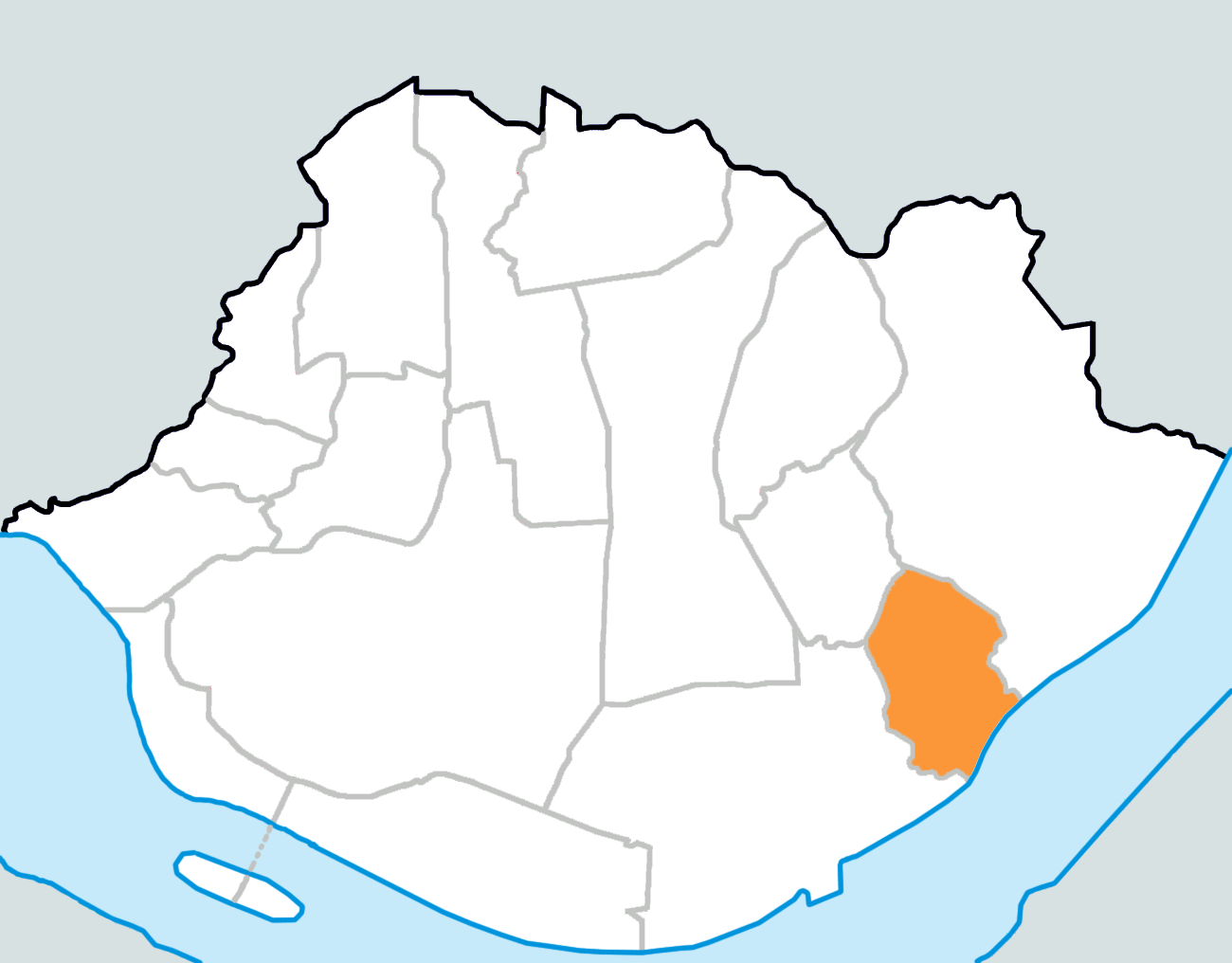
- Country: South Korea

Area
  - Total: 0.71 km^{2} (0.27 sq mi)

Population (2013)
  - Total: 17,183
  - Density: 24,000/km^{2} (63,000/sq mi)

Korean name
- Hangul: 보광동
- Hanja: 普光洞
- RR: Bogwang-dong
- MR: Pogwang-dong

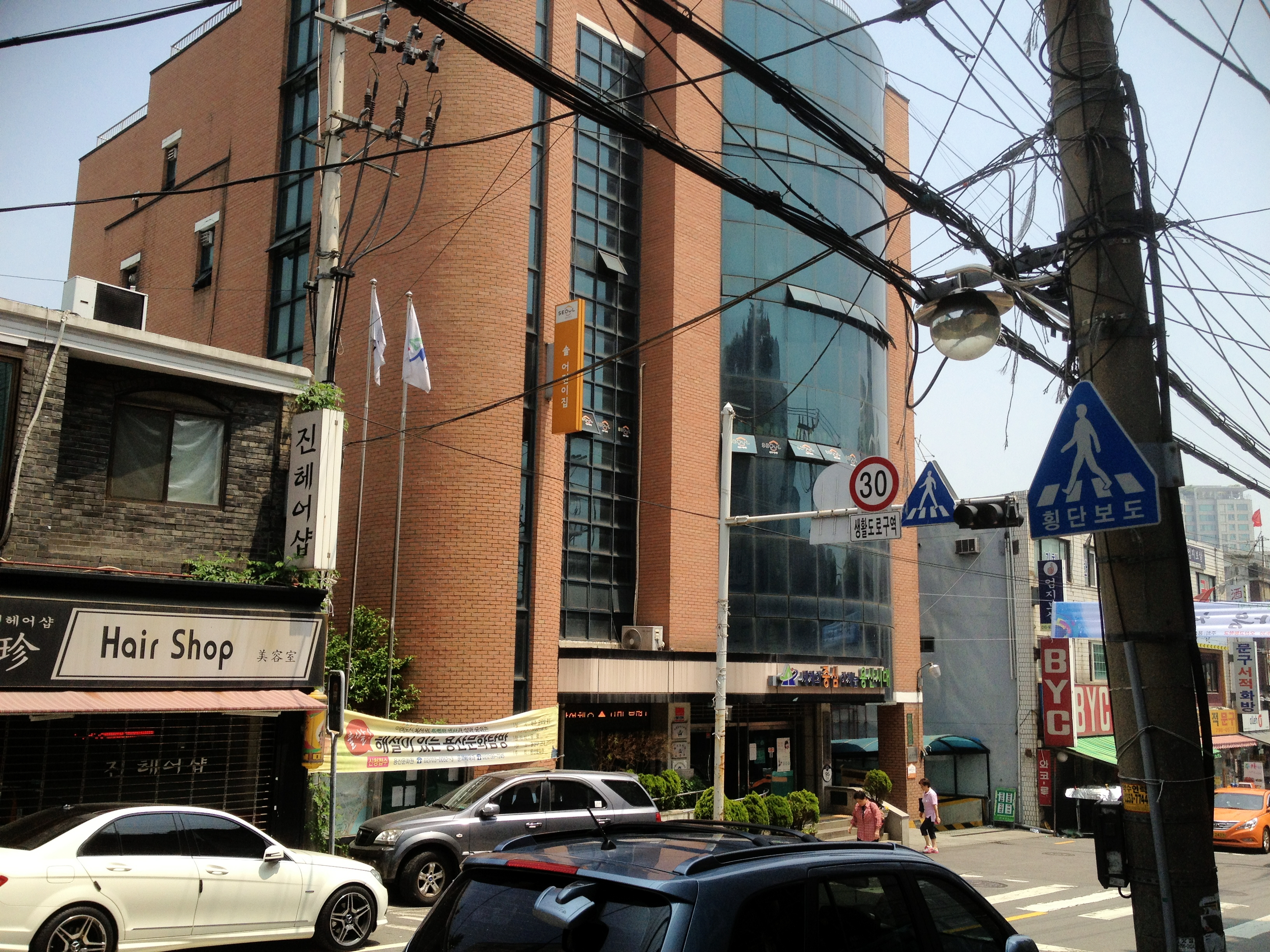
Bogwang-dong Community Center

Bogwang-dong (Korean: 보광동) is a dong (neighborhood) of Yongsan District, Seoul, South Korea. Much of the area has been demolished to make way for Hannam New Town, a planned high-value apartment complex.

== Etymology ==
The name Bogwang-dong comes from the name of State Preceptor Bogwang, who built a temple here during the reign of King Jinheung of Silla.

== History ==
In the early Joseon dynasty, it belonged to the Seongjeosimni area of Hansungbu. In 1751, the southern part of Hanseongbu became part of Hangangbang. In 1914, Hanji-myeon, Goyang-gun, Gyeonggi-do became Bogwang-ri. On 1 April 1936, Hanji-myeon, Goyang-gun was incorporated into Gyeongseong-bu and the name was changed to Bogwangjeong. In April 1943, it was incorporated into Yongsan District through the implementation of the district system. On 1 October 1946, the name was changed to Bogwang-dong following the liquidation of remnants of Japanese colonial rule.

== Education ==
- Osan High School
- Osan Middle School

== Cultural heritage ==
Although not designated as cultural heritage, Bogwang-dong has two neighborhood shrines called Utdang and Araetdang. The term "dang" refers to a place where gods were enshrined in each government office during the Joseon period in Hanyang (now Seoul). Firstly, Utdang, located near Osan High School, enshrines Kim Yushin, a general from the Silla period. On the other hand, Araetdang, located near Bogwang-dong Community Center, enshrines Jangseong, the prime minister of the Shu Han dynasty in China. Additionally, Utdang holds ancestral rites on the first day of the lunar calendar in January, while Araetdang holds them on the first day of the lunar calendar in March and October.

== See also ==
- Administrative divisions of South Korea
