= Cheongam-dong =

Coordinates: 37.535°N 126.946°E

- Interactive map of Cheongam-dong
- Country: South Korea

Area
  - Total: 0.17 km^{2} (0.066 sq mi)

Korean name
- Hangul: 청암동
- Hanja: 淸岩洞
- RR: Cheongam-dong
- MR: Ch'ŏngam-dong

Cheongam-dong (Korean: 청암동) is a dong (neighborhood) of Yongsan District, Seoul, South Korea. It is a legal dong (법정동) administered under its administrative dong (행정동 行政洞), Wonhyoro 2-dong.

== See also ==
- Administrative divisions of South Korea
