= Singye-dong =

- Interactive map of Singye-dong
- Country: South Korea

Area
  - Total: 0.14 km^{2} (0.054 sq mi)

Korean name
- Hangul: 신계동
- Hanja: 新契洞
- RR: Singye-dong
- MR: Sin'gye-dong

Singye-dong (Korean: 신계동) is a dong (neighbourhood) of Yongsan District, Seoul, South Korea. It is a legal dong (법정동 法定洞) administered under its administrative dong (행정동 行政洞), Hangangno 1-dong.

== See also ==
- Administrative divisions of South Korea
