= Wonhyoro-dong =

Coordinates: 37°32′N 126°58′E

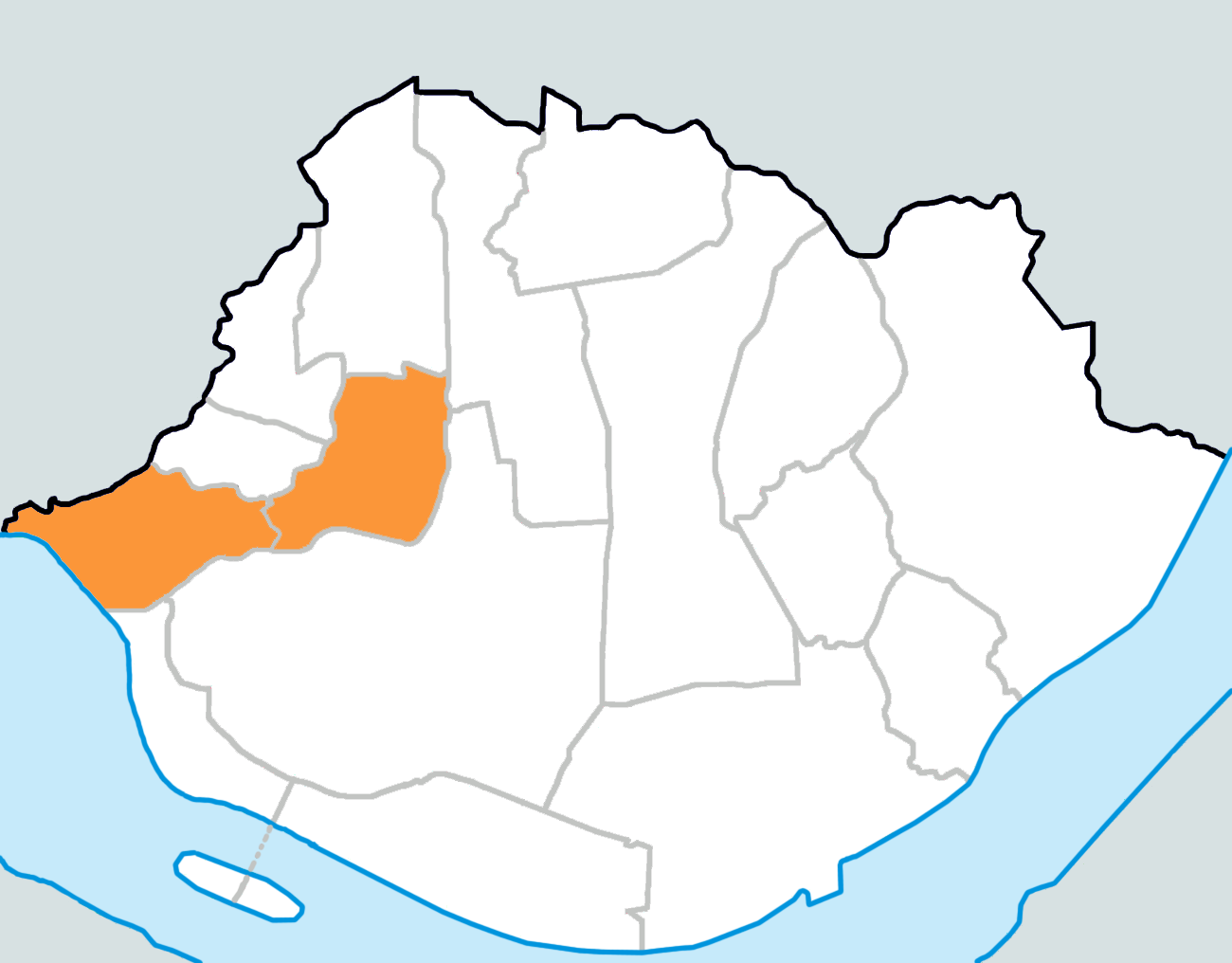
- Country: South Korea

Area
  - Total: 1.4 km^{2} (0.54 sq mi)

Population (2013)
  - Total: 28,334
  - Density: 20,000/km^{2} (52,000/sq mi)

Korean name
- Hangul: 원효로동
- Hanja: 元曉路洞
- RR: Wonhyoro-dong
- MR: Wŏnhyoro-dong

Wonhyoro-dong (Korean: 원효로동) is a dong (neighbourhood) of Yongsan District, Seoul, South Korea.

== Etymology ==
Following its liberation in 1946, the process of renaming streets that were previously under Japanese rule took place. As part of this initiative, the region formerly known as Wonjeong (元町) underwent a name change to Wonhyoro, in honor of the esteemed monk Wonhyo from the Silla period. Consequently, the area was further divided into distinct sections namely Wonhyoro 1-ga, Wonhyo-ro 2-ga, Wonhyoro 3-ga, and Wonhyoro 4-ga.

== See also ==
- Administrative divisions of South Korea
