= Namyeong-dong =

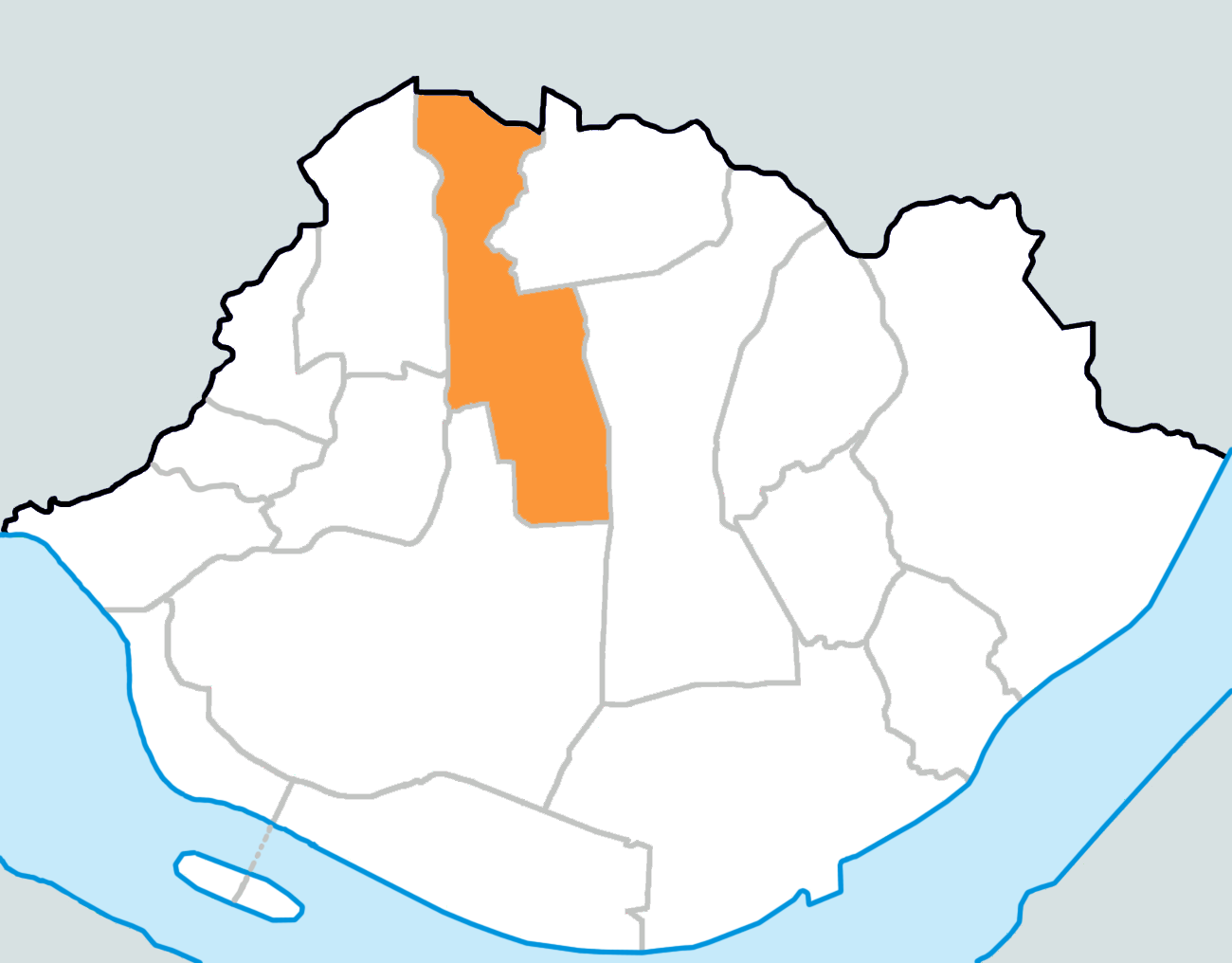
- Country: South Korea

Area
  - Total: 1.19 km^{2} (0.46 sq mi)

Population (2025)
  - Total: 6,932
  - Density: 5,830/km^{2} (15,100/sq mi)

Korean name
- Hangul: 남영동
- Hanja: 南營洞
- RR: Namyeong-dong
- MR: Namyŏng-dong

Namyeong-dong (Korean: 남영동) is a dong (neighbourhood) of Yongsan District, Seoul, South Korea.

== Etymology ==
The name Namyeong originates from the presence of military camps near the area and its location in the southern part of downtown Seoul.

== See also ==
- Administrative divisions of South Korea
