= Orion Corporation (South Korean company) =

South Korean confectionery company

- Native name: 주식회사 오리온
- Company type: Public
- Traded as: KRX: 271560
- Industry: Confectionery
- Headquarters: Seoul, South Korea
- Area served: Worldwide
- Key people: Lee Seung-jeon (chairman); Hur Inn-chul (vice chairman and CEO)
- Website: www.orionworld.com/en/

Orion Corporation (Korean: 주식회사 오리온) is a South Korean confectionery company, headquartered in Munbae-dong, Yongsan District, Seoul. The company is one of the three largest food companies in South Korea, and was established in 1956 as Tongyang Confectionery Corp. Orion has manufacturing facilities in Seoul, Cheonan Chungcheongnam-do and cities in China, Russia, Vietnam, India and the United States. Products produced by Orion include biscuits, cookies, crackers, pies, gum, snacks, chocolate, candy, and its most famous product, Choco Pie. Its competitors include Crown Confectionery and Lotte Wellfood. Orion was the parent company of the entertainment company On-Media, until its acquisition by the CJ Group in 2010.

The company began offering the Choco Pie in 1974. By 2006 it had two thirds of the Chinese cookie market.

Orion maintains a "Choco Pie Index", created as a parody of The Economist's Big Mac Index.

== See also ==
- Tongyang Group
- List of food companies
- List of confectionery brands
