= Yongsan-dong, Seoul =

Yongsan-dong
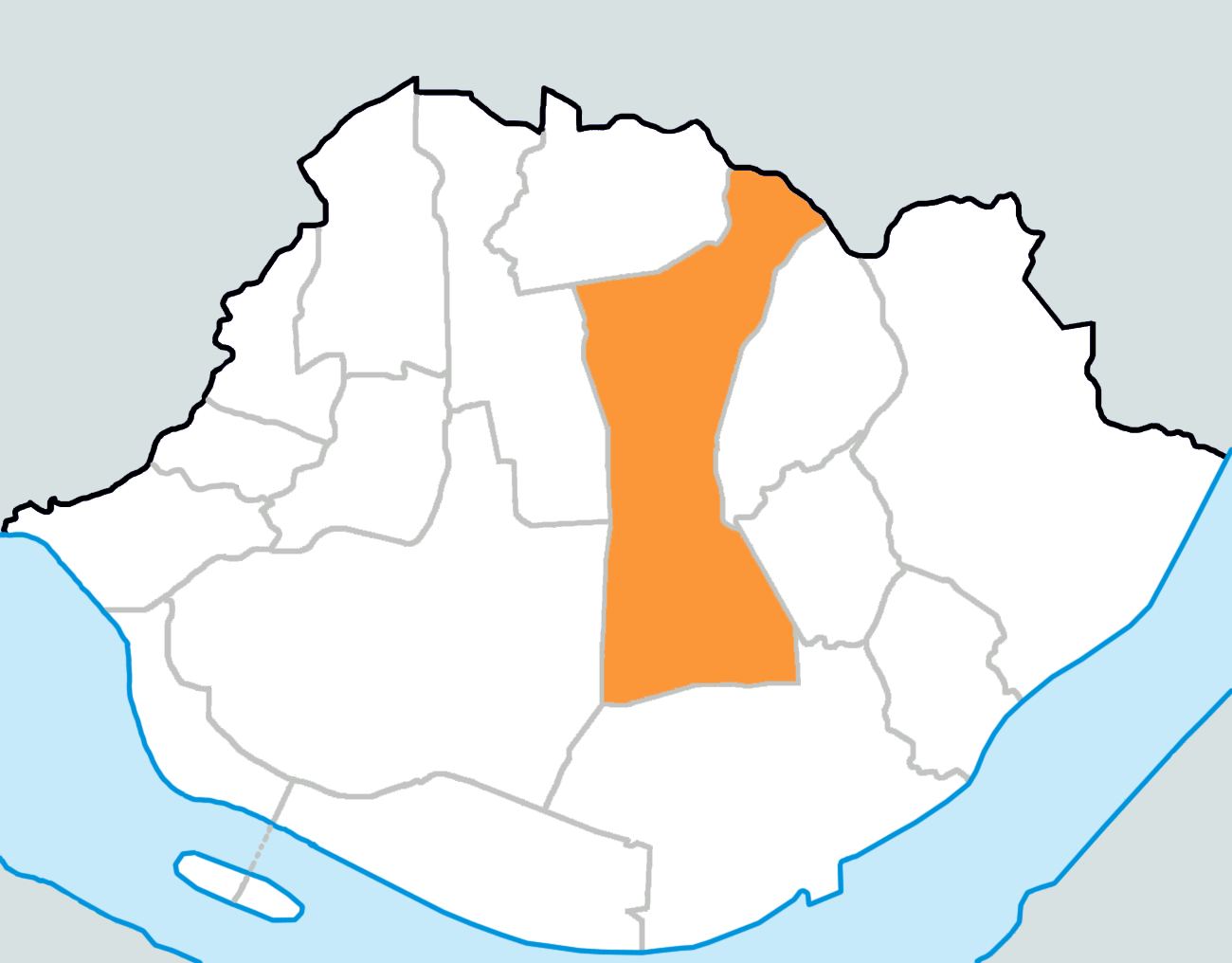
- Country: South Korea

Area
  - Total: 1.96 km^{2} (0.76 sq mi)

Population (2013)
  - Total: 12,612
  - Density: 6,430/km^{2} (16,700/sq mi)

Korean name
- Hangul: 용산동
- Hanja: 龍山洞
- RR: Yongsan-dong
- MR: Yongsan-dong

Yongsan-dong (Korean: 용산동) is a ward of Yongsan District, Seoul, South Korea.

== Attractions ==
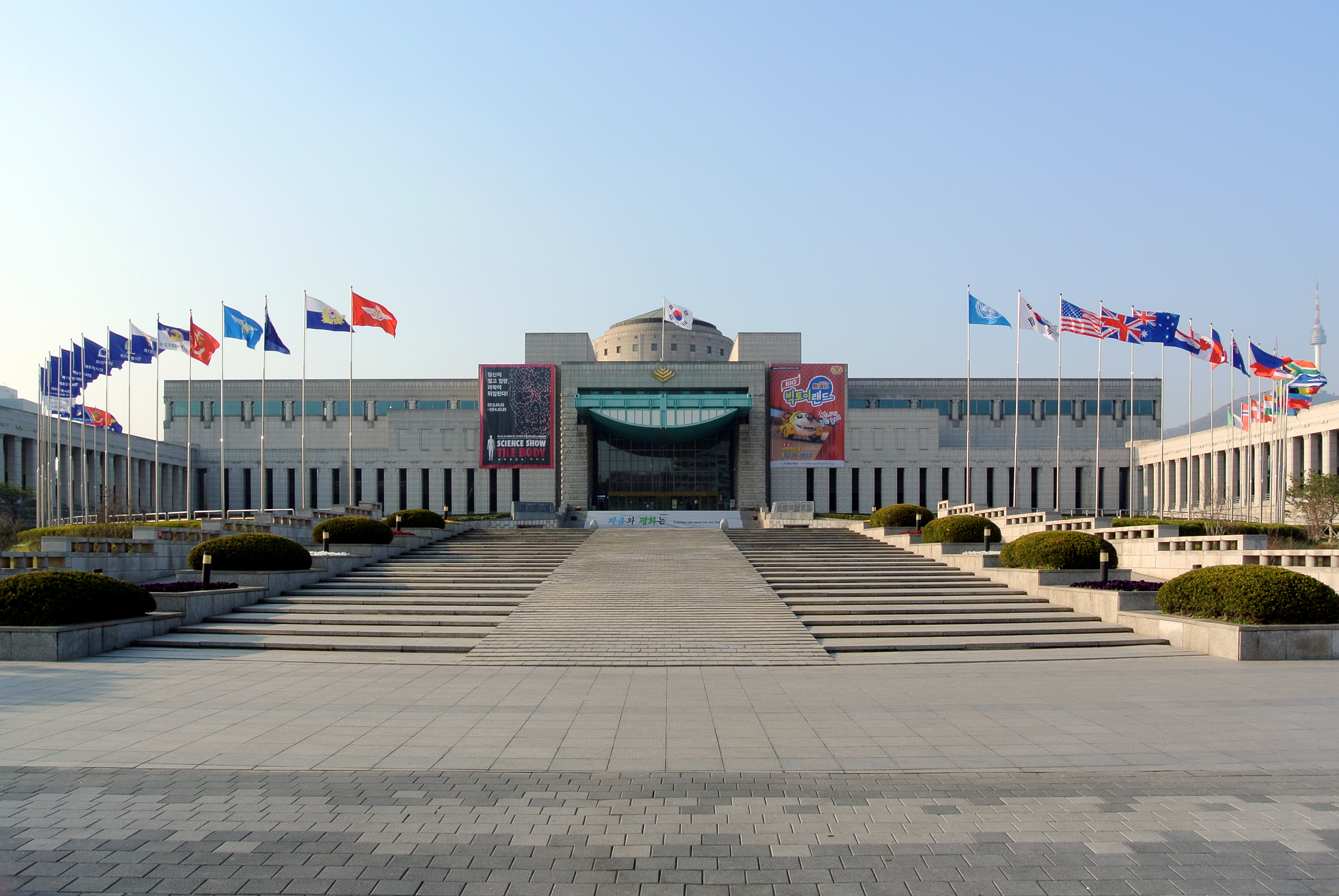
Main building and museum of the War Memorial of Korea, Namsan Tower on the far right

- National Museum of Korea
- War Memorial of Korea

== Government and infrastructure ==
The ward has the headquarters of the Ministry of National Defense. Currently, from May 2022 to December 2025, it is the residence building of the Office of the President of South Korea.

== Education ==
Schools located in Yongsan-dong:

- Seoul Yongam Elementary School
- Bosung Girls' Middle School
- Yongsan Middle School
- Bosung Girls' High School
- Yongsan High School
