= Yongmun-dong =

Neighborhood in Seoul, South Korea

- Saechang-ro in Yongmun-dong

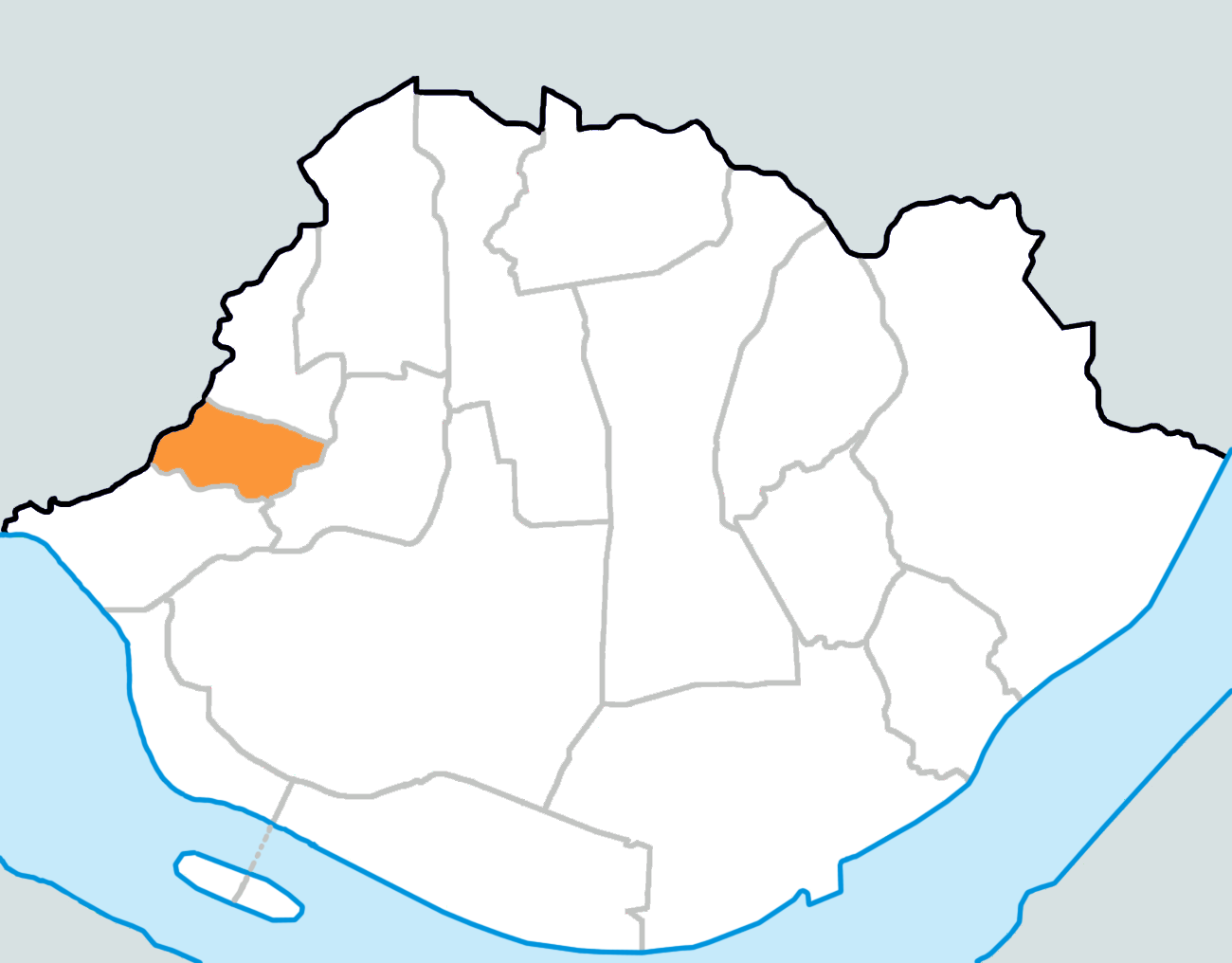
- Country: South Korea

Area
  - Total: 0.28 km^{2} (0.11 sq mi)

Population (2013)
  - Total: 12,974
  - Density: 46,000/km^{2} (120,000/sq mi)

Korean name
- Hangul: 용문동
- Hanja: 龍門洞
- RR: Yongmun-dong
- MR: Yongmun-dong

Yongmun-dong (Korean: 용문동) is a dong (neighbourhood) of Yongsan District, Seoul, South Korea.

== Overview ==
Yongmun-dong was founded in 1946 and is known for its significant annual celebrations held on April 1 and October 17. Historically, the eastern region of Yongmun-dong boasted a substantial peach orchard planting area.

== See also ==
- Administrative divisions of South Korea
