= Sinchang-dong, Seoul =

Sinchang-dong
- Interactive map of Sinchang-dong
- Country: South Korea

Area
  - Total: 0.06 km^{2} (0.023 sq mi)

Korean name
- Hangul: 신창동
- Hanja: 新倉洞
- RR: Sinchang-dong
- MR: Sinch'ang-dong

Sinchang-dong (Korean: 신창동) is a dong (neighbourhood) of Yongsan District, Seoul, South Korea. It is a legal dong (법정동 法定洞) administered under its administrative dong (행정동 行政洞), Wonhyoro 2-dong.

== See also ==
- Administrative divisions of South Korea
