= Yongsan District =

District of Seoul, South Korea

Yongsan
- Autonomous District
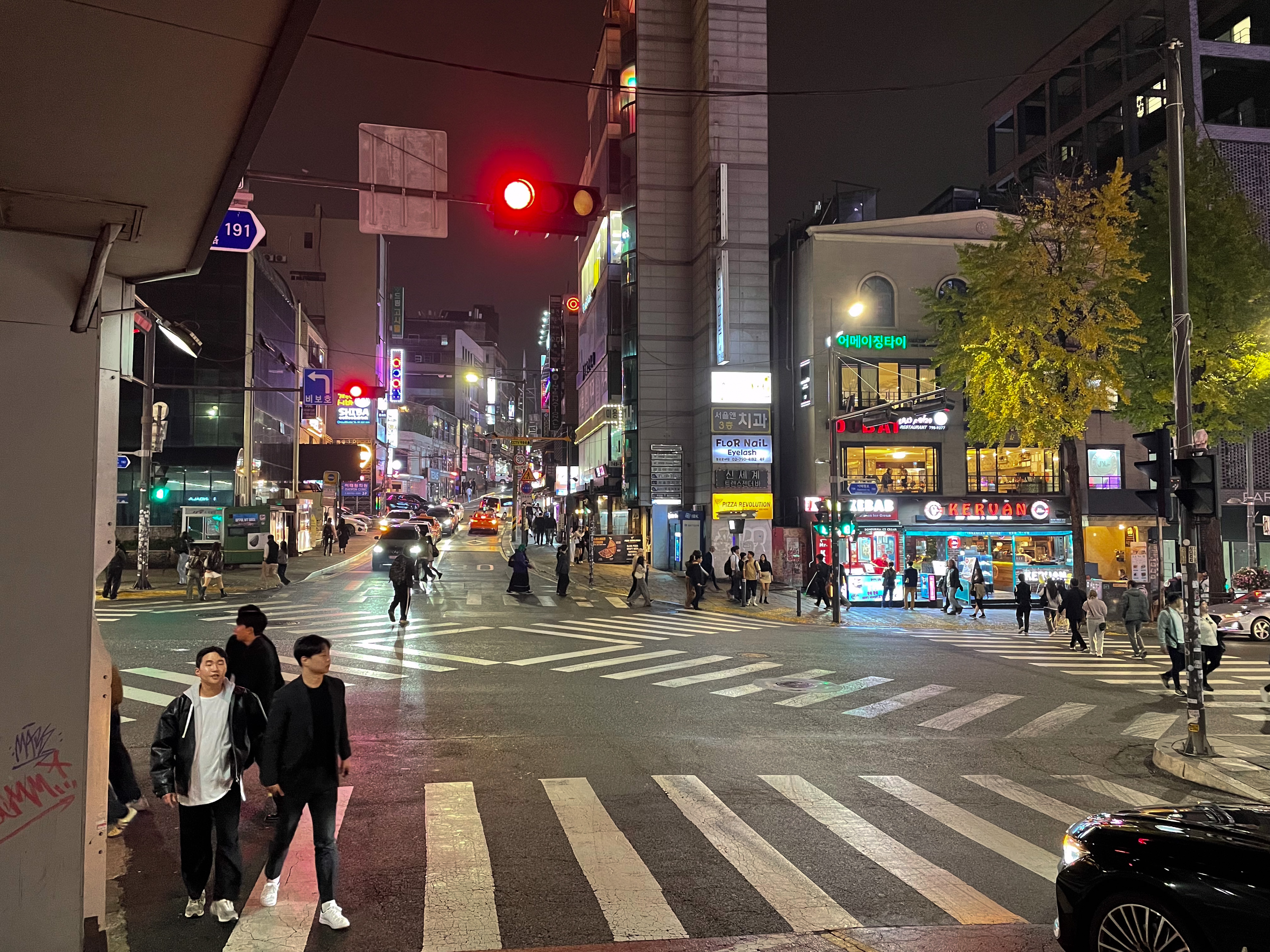
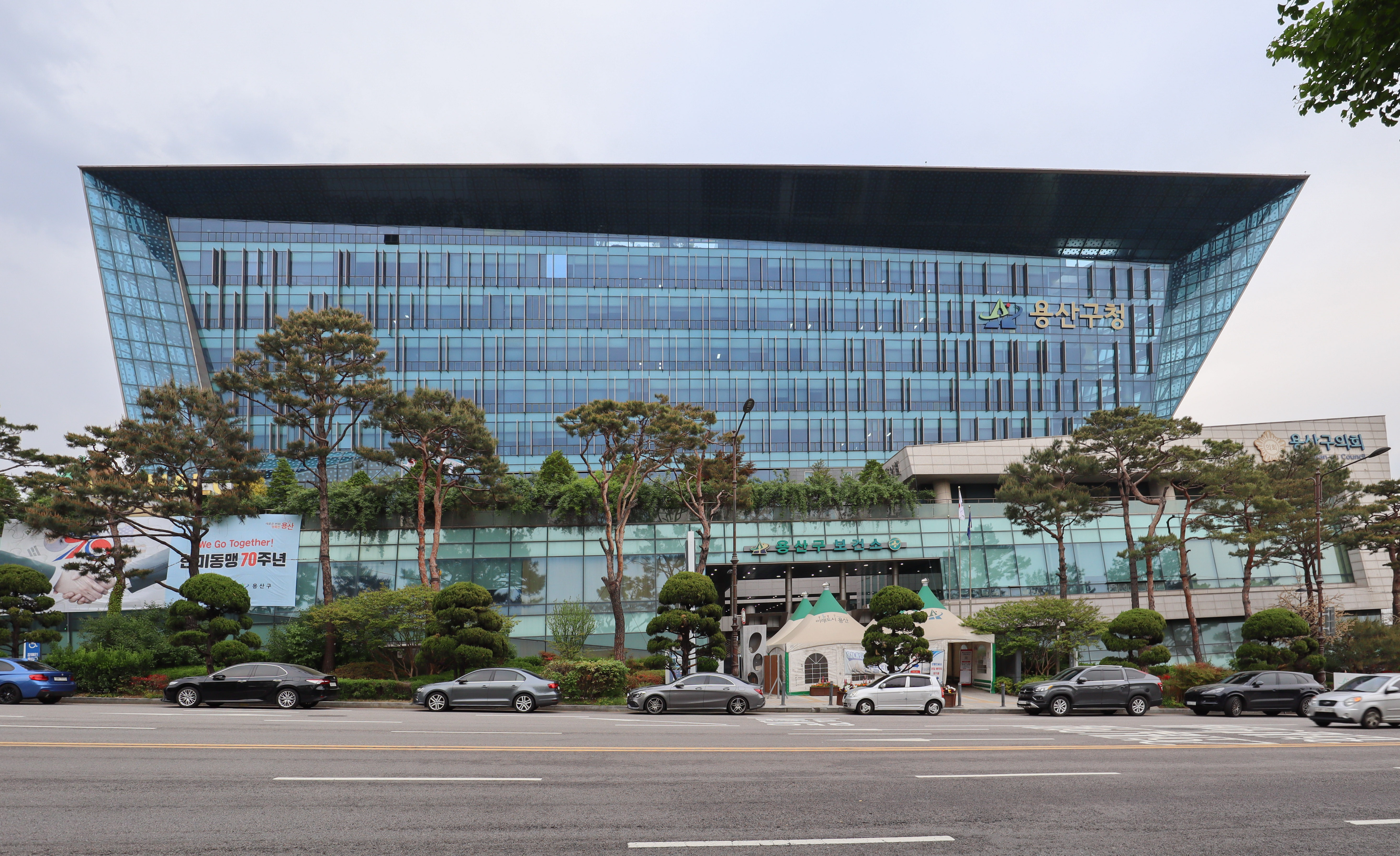
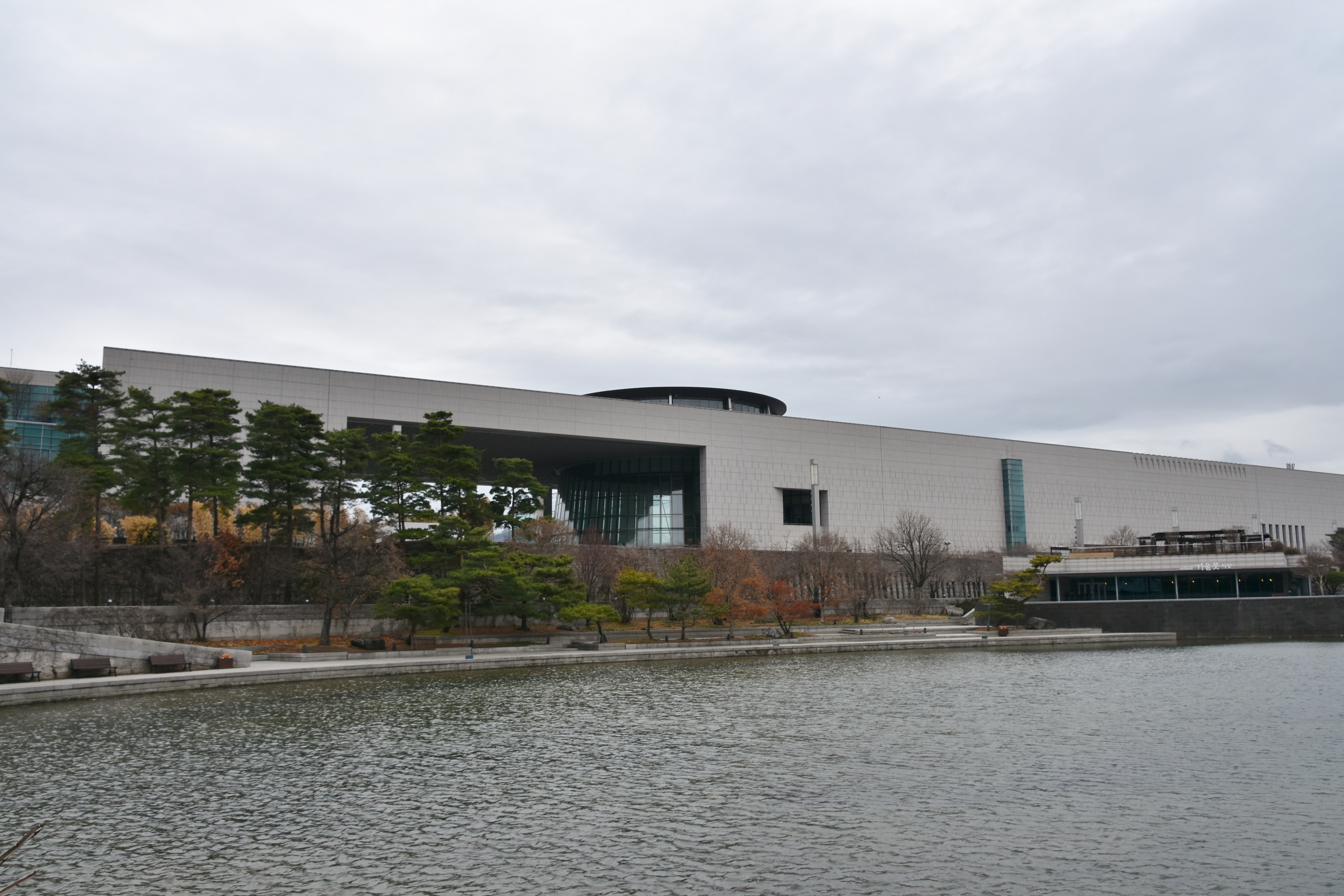
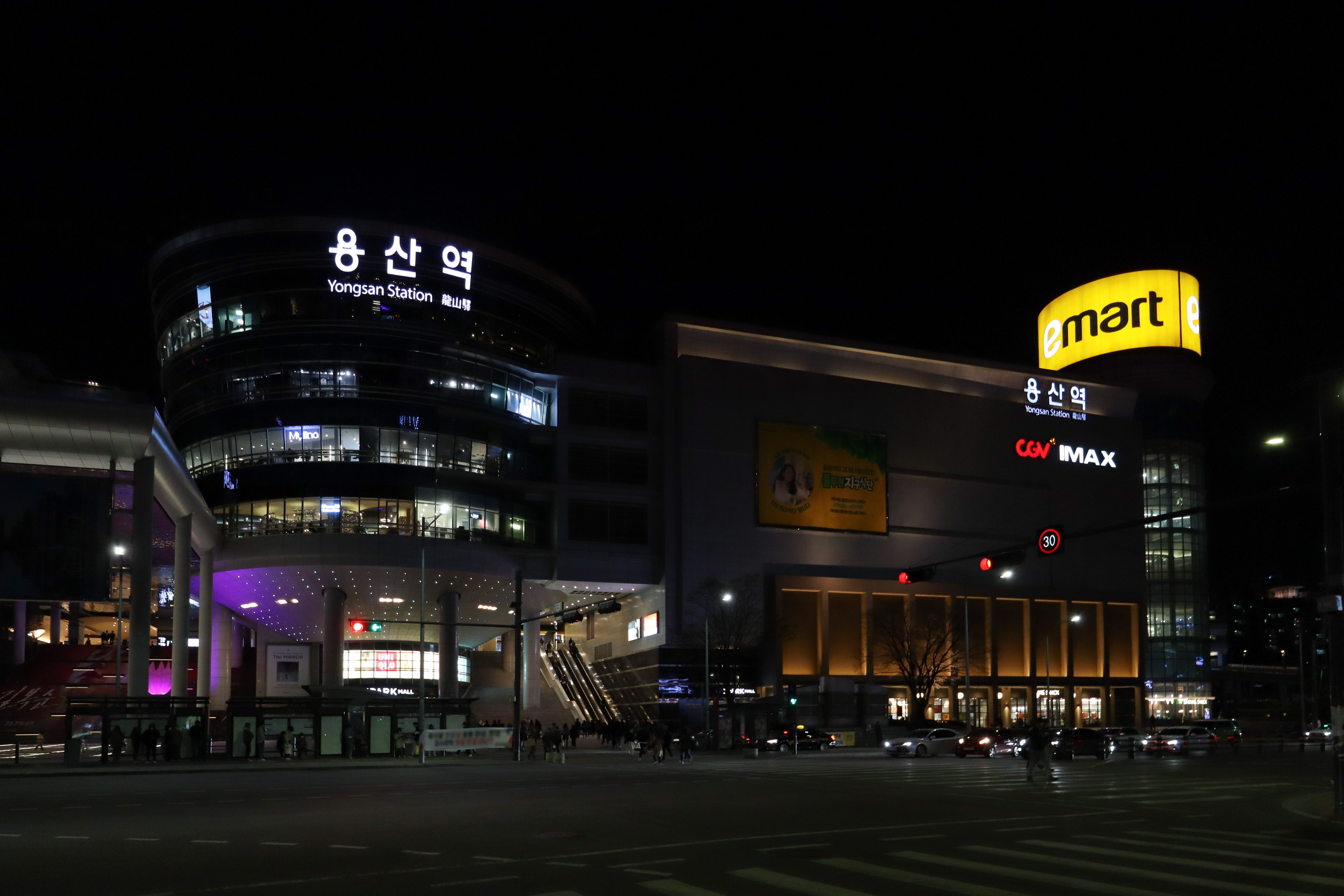
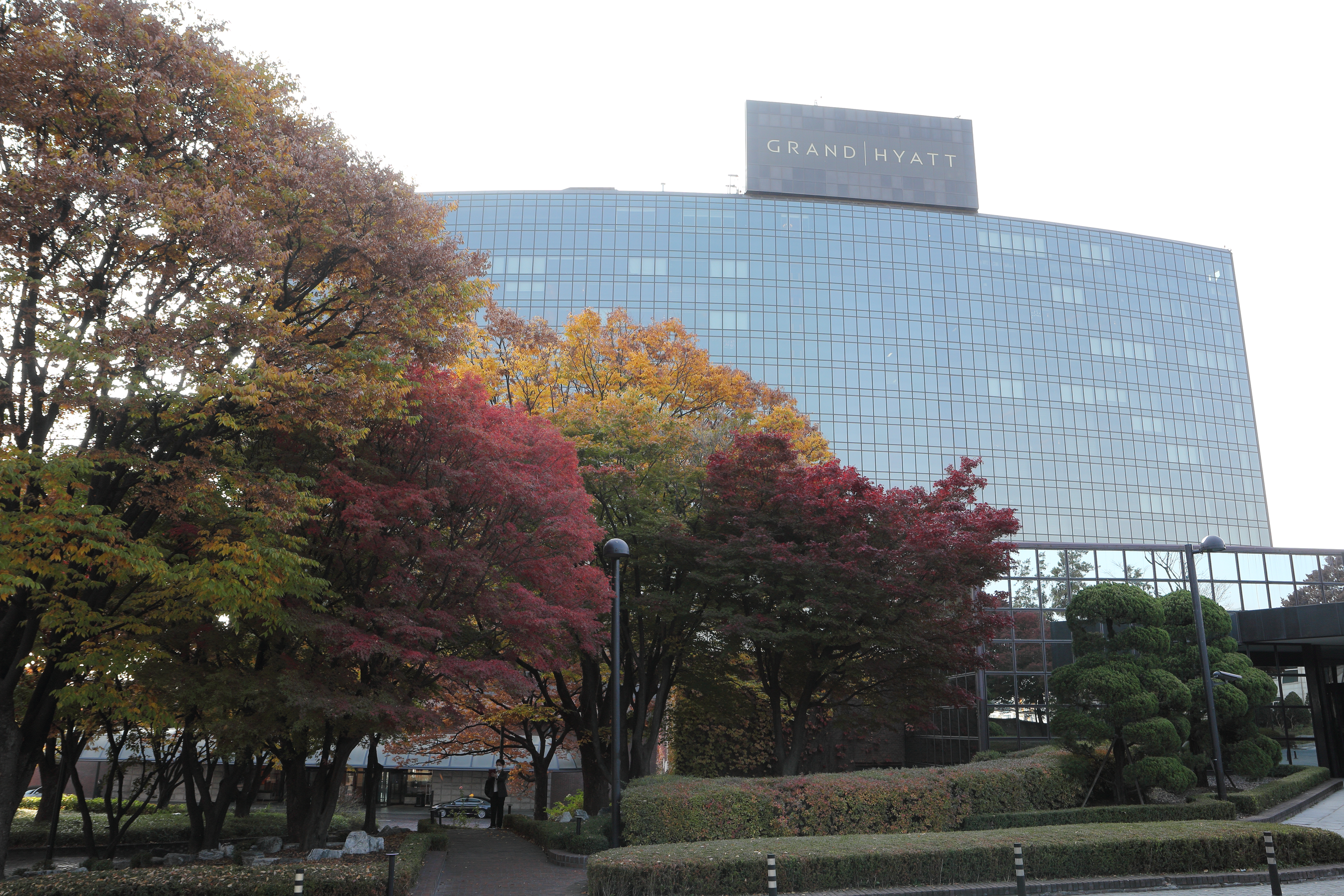
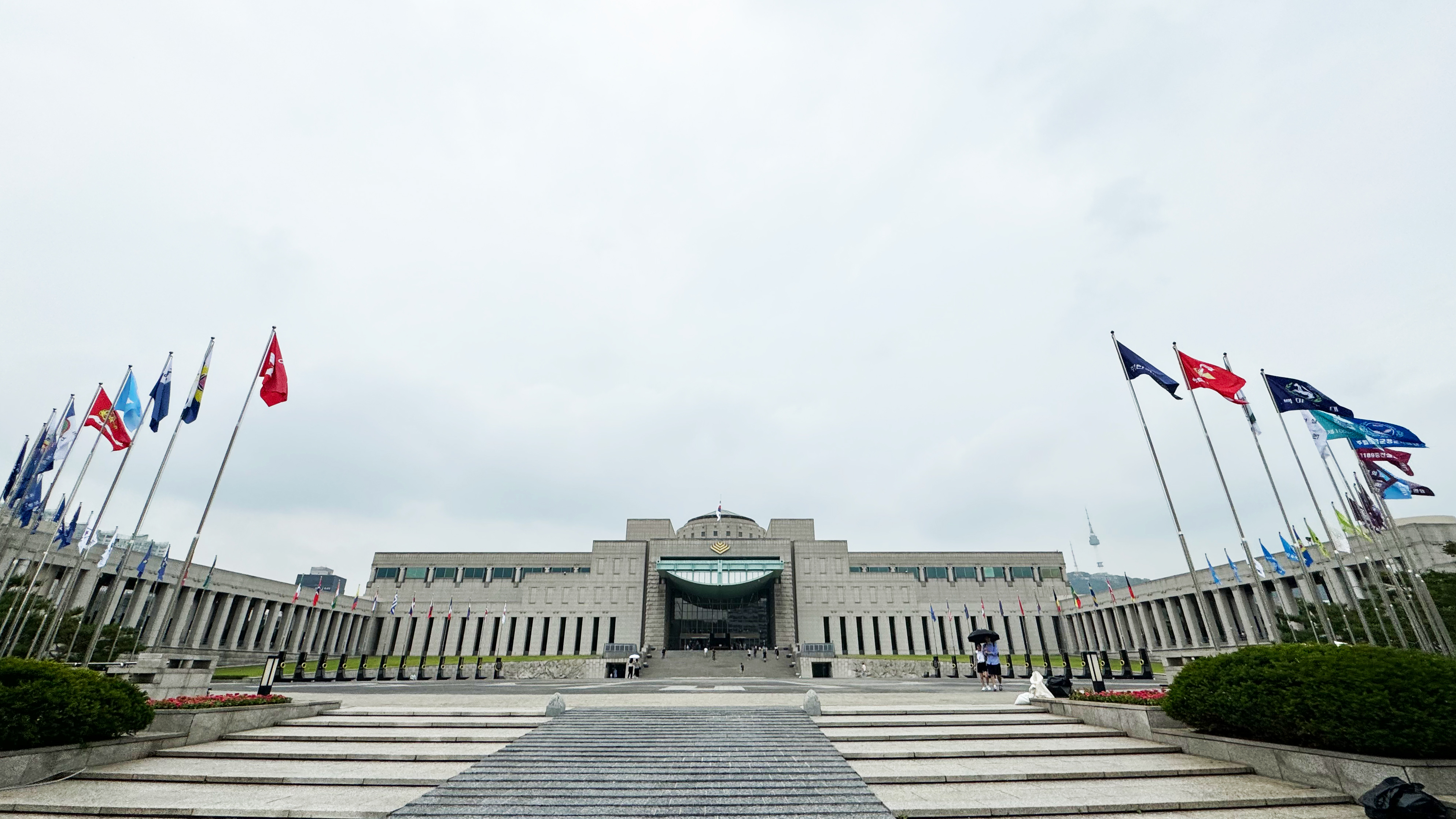
- Itaewon Yongsan-gu Office National Museum of Korea Yongsan Station Grand Hyatt Seoul War Memorial of Korea

- Flag

- Location of Yongsan District in Seoul
- Coordinates: 37°32′18″N 126°57′56″E
- Country: South Korea
- Region: Sudogwon
- Special City: Seoul
- Administrative dong: 19
- District Established: 1896 (as Yongsan-bang), 1946 (Yongsan District)

Government
  - Body: Yongsan-gu Council
  - Mayor: Kim Kyung-dae (People Power)
  - MNA: Kwon Young-se (People Power)

Area
  - Total: 21.87 km^{2} (8.44 sq mi)

Population (September 2024)
  - Total: 205,145
  - Density: 9,380/km^{2} (24,290/sq mi)
- Time zone: UTC+9 (Korea Standard Time)
- Postal code: 04300 – 04499
- Area code(s): +82-2-7xx
- Website: Official website

Korean name
- Hangul: 용산구
- Hanja: 龍山區
- RR: Yongsan-gu
- MR: Yongsan-gu

Yongsan District (Korean: 용산구; [joŋsʰanɡu]) is one of the 25 districts of Seoul, South Korea. It has a population of 231,685 (2020) and has a geographic area of 21.87 km^{2} (8.44 sq mi), and is divided into 19 dong (administrative neighborhoods). Yongsan is located near Downtown Seoul, on the northern bank of the Han River, bordering the city districts of Jung to the north, Mapo to the west, Yeongdeungpo and Dongjak to the southwest, Seocho and Gangnam District to the southeast, and Seongdong to the east.

== Description ==
Yongsan District is a district in central Seoul, South Korea. It sits to the north of the Han River and is part of the Seongjeosimni (Outer old Seoul) area immediately south of Seoul's historic center in Jung district on the southern side of Namsan. It is home to roughly 250,000 people and is divided into 20 dong, or neighborhoods. Notable locations in Yongsan District include Yongsan Station, the sprawling Yongsan Electronics Market, Haebangchon and the Itaewon commercial district. Itaewon is widely known as one of the most ethnically diverse regions in Korea. Many foreigners gravitate to its shopping centers and nightlife.

It is the site of Yongsan Garrison, a large United States military base which, as of 2021, has gradually been wound down with the US forces being moved to Camp Humphreys in Pyeongtaek.

== Geography ==
Yongsan is located next to the Han River, with level ground in the west of the district which has been used for transportation (rail) and commercial use since the early 20th century. To the east and north in the land is steeper and rises towards Namsan which lies to the north. Namsan has an elevation of 243m and consists mostly of granite. The low lying western section of the district is approximately 15-20 above sea level. This low-lying area has been prone to flooding during periods of heavy rainfall, a common issue with most of the low lying riverside districts in the city.

== Etymology ==
The name Yongsan derives from hanja and means "Dragon Mountain". In hanja, the characters are 龍 yong (meaning "dragon") and 山 san (meaning "mountain").

== History ==
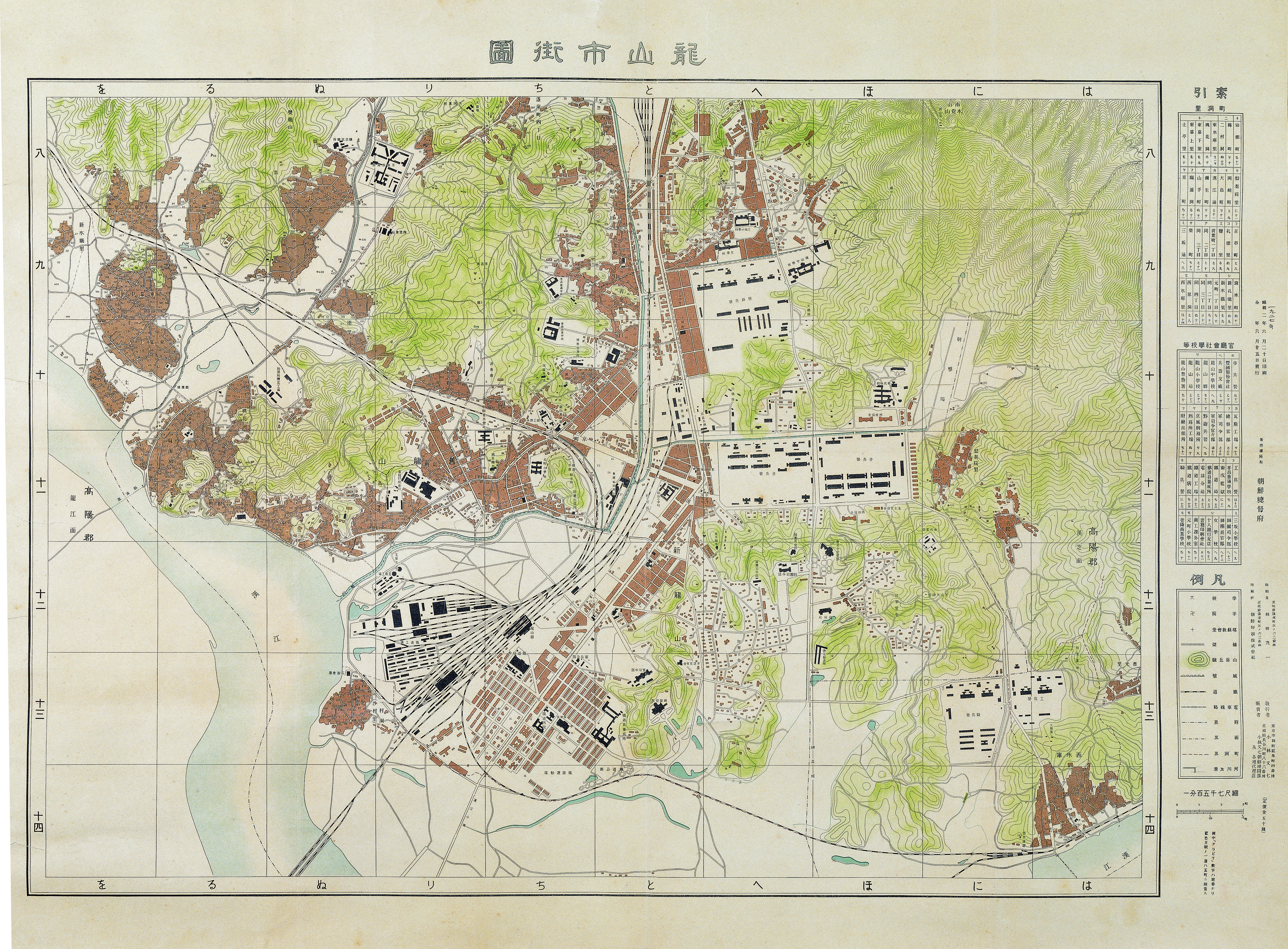
Yongsan urban map (1927)

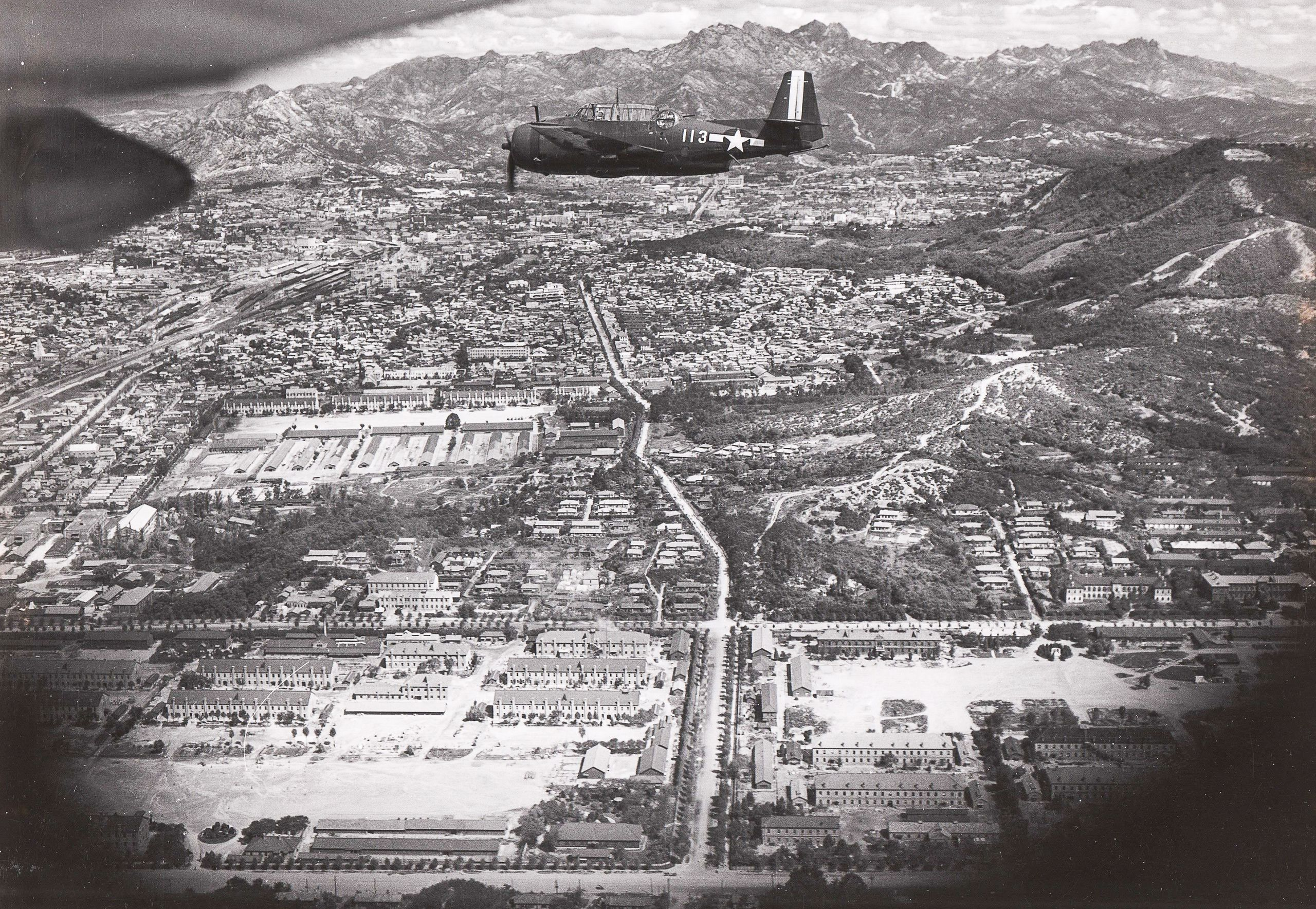
Yongsan in 1945

The oldest recorded mention of Yongsan is in a fable about two dragons that appeared over the Han River in the 21st year of King Giru's reign during the Baekje Dynasty. Some also say that the name "Yongsan" (which means "dragon mountain" in Korean) comes from the shape of the area's mountains, which resemble that of a dragon.

During the Joseon period, Yongsan served as an entry point to the city of Seoul for seaborne travelers and merchants, with a small port facility in operation by the Han River. As such, the area became known for commerce and is considered the first example of capitalism taking place in Korea. Given its commercial importance and growing size, it effectively became Korea's first satellite city as it sat a short distance outside the old city walls of Seoul.

Yongsan was designated an "open district" by the Korean government in 1884 and subsequently a foreign community established itself in the area, consisting of French, Chinese and Japanese missionaries. Permission was given for missionary work to commence in 1887.

Yongsan District, as an administrative district, came into being on April 17, 1896, under the name "Yongsan-bang". In October 1945 it became "Yongsan-gu" and in 1946 "Yongsan District of Seoul." The smaller administrative units, "dongs", were introduced in 1955.

== Administration ==
=== Administrative divisions ===
Yongsan District administrative divisions

Yongsan is divided into the following areas ('dongs'), each of which is served by a community center (주민센터).

- Bogwang-dong (보광동 / 普光洞)
- Cheongpa-dong (청파동 / 靑坡洞)
  - Seogye-dong (서계동 / 西界洞)
- Hangangno-dong (한강로동 / 漢江路洞)
- Hannam-dong (한남동 / 漢南洞)
- Huam-dong (후암동 / 厚岩洞)
- Hyochang-dong (효창동 / 孝昌洞)
- Ichon 1-dong (이촌 1동 / 二村一洞)
- Ichon 2-dong (이촌 2동 / 二村二洞)
- Itaewon 1-dong (이태원 1동 / 梨泰院一洞)
- Itaewon 2-dong (이태원 2동 / 梨泰院二洞)
- Namyeong-dong (남영동 / 南營洞)
  - Dongja-dong (동자동 / 東子洞)
  - Garwol-dong (갈월동 / 葛月洞)
- Seobinggo-dong (서빙고동 / 西氷庫洞)
  - Dongbinggo-dong (동빙고동 / 東氷庫洞)
  - Juseong-dong (주성동 / 鑄城洞)
- Wonhyoro 1-dong (원효로 1동 / 元曉路一洞)
  - Munbae-dong (문배동 / 文培洞)
  - Singye-dong (신계동 / 新契洞)
- Wonhyoro 2-dong (원효로 2동 / 元曉路二洞)
- Wonhyoro 3-dong (원효로 3동 / 元曉路三洞)
- Wonhyoro 4-dong (원효로 4동 / 元曉路四洞)
  - Sancheon-dong (산천동 / 山泉洞)
  - Sinchang-dong (신창동 / 新倉洞)
  - Cheongam-dong (청암동 / 淸岩洞)
- Yongmun-dong (용문동 / 龍門洞)
  - Dowon-dong (도원동 / 桃園洞)
- Yongsan 2 ga-dong (용산 2가동 / 龍山二街洞)

=== Local government ===
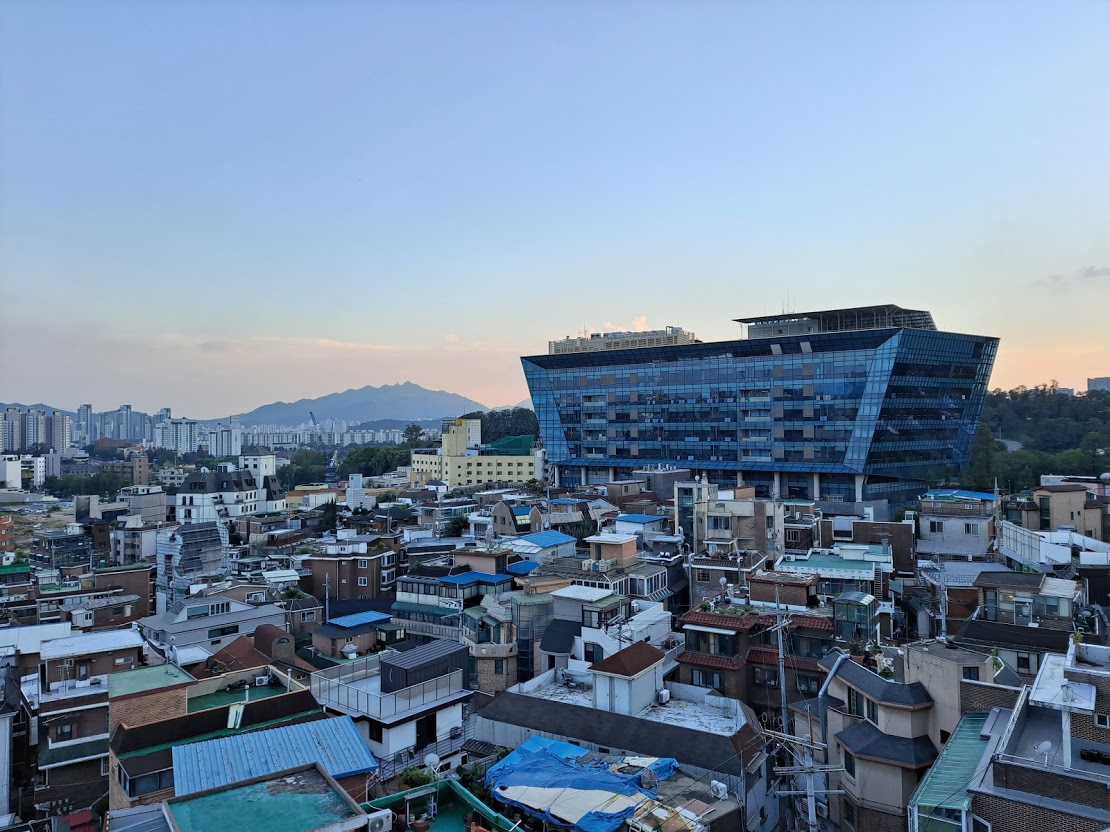
Yongsan District office

The Yongsan district office is located close to Noksapyeong Station on Noksapyeong-daero. The district office provides services to Koreans and foreign residents in Korea, including issuing documentation, taxes, public safety and medical services. It is also responsible for maintaining leisure facilities in the district including: Yongsan Sports Center, Ichon Hangang Riverside Park, Namsan, Hyochang Park and Yongsan Family Park.

== Demographics ==
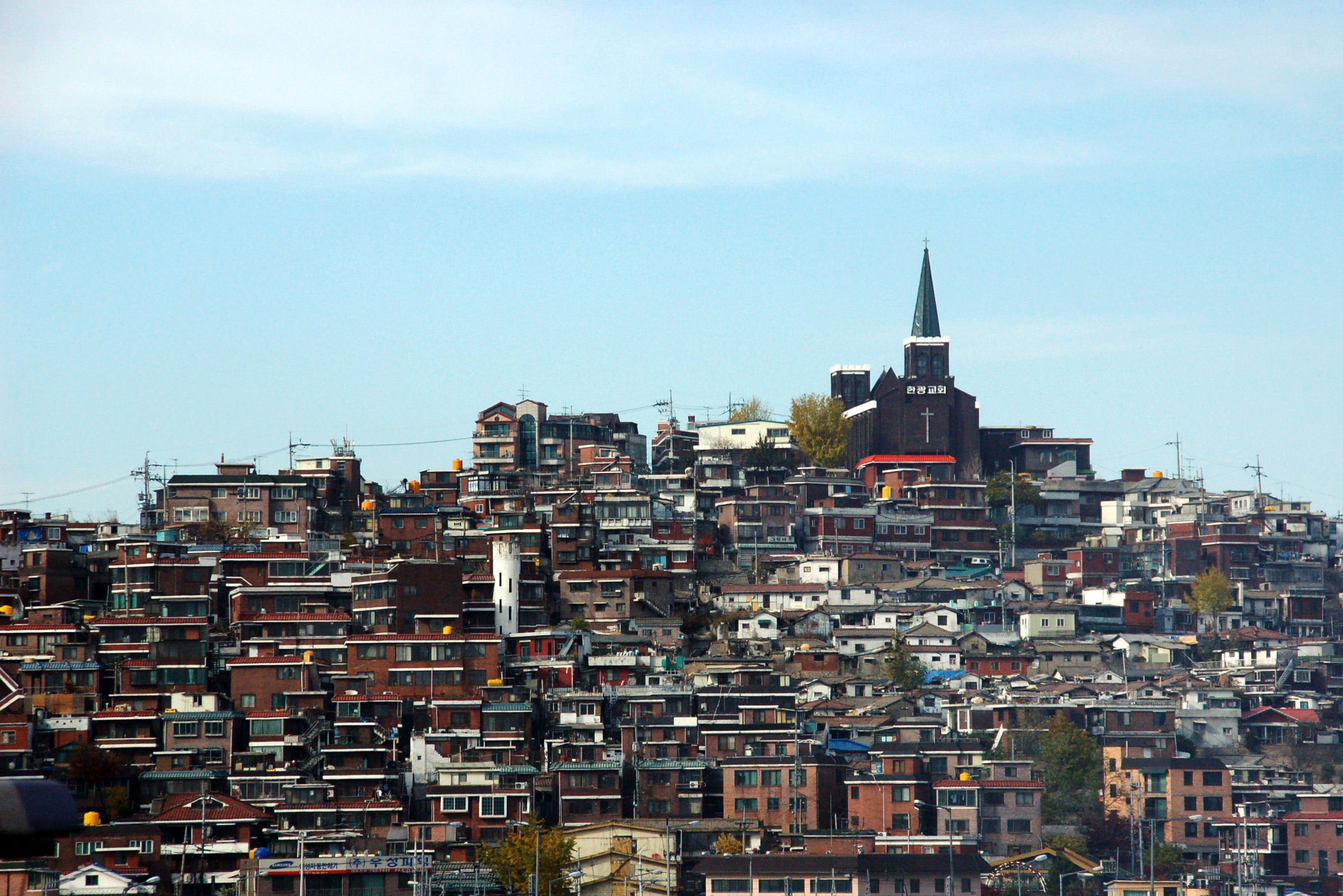
Haebangchon, an area with a large foreign community

Seoul Central Mosque

Since the establishment of a foreign community in Yongsan in the late 19th century, the area has been known as the most multicultural district in the city. This moniker was due in no small part to the presence of the Yongsan Garrison. However, other establishments such as the Seoul Central Mosque have had a huge effect on the culture and demographic nature of the district. According to statistics from the Yongsan district office, the foreign community has been increasing every year since 2015, when the total number of foreign residents was 19,078. As of 2020, it was 21,067.

Foreign Residents (as of 2020)	
USA	4,719
China	3,202
Japan	1,295
Philippines	635
Nigeria	556
Germany	462
UK	331
India	414
Taiwan	352
Other	9,101
Total	21,067

== Politics and government ==
The headquarters of the Korean Ministry of National Defense (MND) are located in Yongsan, in between the northern and southern sections of Yongsan Garrison, close to Samgakji station.

Currently, the official residence and executive office of the President of South Korea is in Yongsan, occupying the building formerly known as the Ministry of National Defense Building. The Presidential office and residence, as well as other related agencies, were moved from the Blue House in Jongno District in 2022, during the term of President Yoon Suk-Yeol.

== Diplomatic missions ==
Being at the center of the city, the district hosts numerous foreign embassies.

- Afghanistan
- Algeria
- Argentina
- Azerbaijan
- Bangladesh
- Belarus
- Belgium
- Bulgaria
- Democratic Republic of the Congo
- Egypt
- Ethiopia
- Fiji
- Gabon
- Georgia
- Ghana
- Hungary
- India
- Iran
- Iraq
- Italy
- Kazakhstan
- Kenya
- Kuwait
- Kyrgyzstan
- Laos
- Latvia
- Lebanon
- Libya
- Malaysia
- Mongolia
- Morocco
- Myanmar
- Nigeria
- Pakistan
- Philippines
- Qatar
- Romania
- Rwanda
- Saudi Arabia
- Sierra Leone
- Slovakia
- Slovenia
- South Africa
- Spain
- Sudan
- Tajikistan
- Tanzania
- Thailand
- Tunisia
- Turkmenistan
- Ukraine
- United Arab Emirates
- Uzbekistan
- Zambia

== Military ==
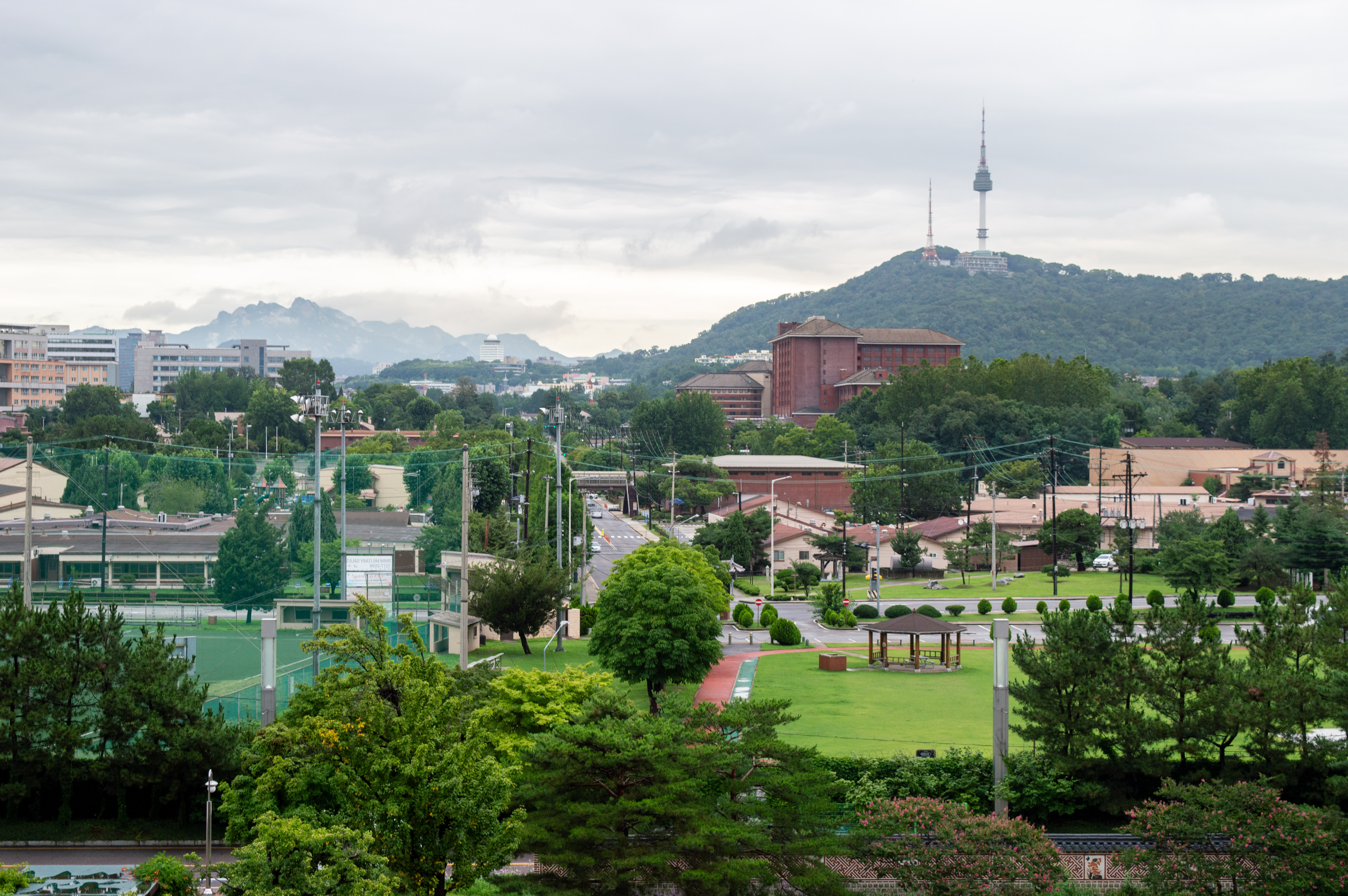
Yongsan Garrison with Namsan in the background

Since the 19th century the Yongsan site has been used as a military installation, first by the Chinese and then primarily by the Japanese who established their military headquarters at the site from 1910 to 1945.

Following the end of WW2, the US Army established a presence at the site which became known as the Yongsan Garrison. The large garrison, which has provided extensive services to US army personnel for over 60 years, is also the site of the US embassy housing compound. Forces and personnel assigned to Yongsan and South Korea as a whole fall under the jurisdiction of the Eighth US Army. As of 2021, most of the US personnel at the site, with the exception of embassy personnel, have been moved to Camp Humphreys in Pyeongtaek, along with Eighth Army HQ, as part of a long-standing agreement between the governments of South Korea and the United States. However, given its strategic importance and its symbolic nature in reassuring South Korea of US commitment to mutual defence and security, at least one US army brigade will remain to the north of Seoul to counteract the loss of the Yongsan Garrison. In addition, a small segment of the garrison will remain under US-ownership specifically to keep the Dragon Hill Lodge open, an important piece of infrastructure catering mainly to US military, government and associated personnel visiting Korea, and to eventually relocate the US Embassy here from its current location at Gwanghwamun.

The presence of the Yongsan Garrison has had a significant effect on life in Seoul and South Korea at large, with the adjacent Itaewon area developing to serve the needs of US personnel stationed at Yongsan. The presence of US personnel, currency and supplies was of huge importance to the people of Seoul in the early years after the Korean War and a considerable black market developed, as did numerous variations of Korean staple dishes using newly arrived US food supplies.

== National Park Proposal ==
The withdrawal of most US personnel and infrastructure from Yongsan will free up a significant amount of land within the district, land which has been under foreign control for over a century. The first proposal for redeveloping the site came from the former president Roh Moo-Hyun in 2005. Since then, negotiations between South Korea and the US over transfer of the land have taken place with the issue of relocating to Pyeongtaek and contamination of the Yongsan site causing delays to the plan. As envisaged in late 2019, the site will become an ecological park of some 3.03 million sq. meters, slightly smaller than Central Park in New York.

In January 2021 the Seoul Metropolitan Government announced that the area would be called Yongsan Park. The name was chosen after a poll in which residents submitted 9,401 name proposals in 2020.

== Economy ==
The AmorePacific HQ in Yongsan.

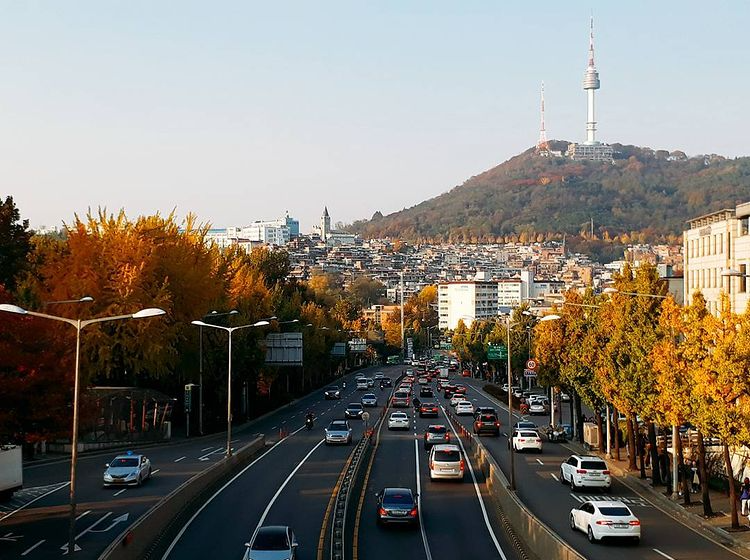
Haebangchon hill neighborhood

Yongsan has a diverse economy with major differences between areas within the district.

The area around Seoul Station and Yongsan Station is dominated by large corporations and KOSPI 200 companies based in Yongsan include Amore Pacific, Orion Confectionery, Cheil Worldwide, HYBE Corporation and Hyundai Development Company. The aforementioned AmorePacific opened their global headquarters next to Shinyongsan Station in 2017.

The Yongsan area has seen considerable development since the mid-2010s with the addition of upmarket apartment buildings are high grade office space. On the west side of Yongsan is Seoul Dragon City, a new multi-tenant hotel development which is planned as the first phase of a major redevelopment project on the site of the disused railroad marshaling yard. The development includes four hotels run by three hotel chains: Novotel, Mercure and Ibis.

Hannam-dong is an upmarket area to the east of the district and is the location of some of the most expensive real estate in Seoul, along with galleries and restaurants.

Finally, Namsan, situated to the north, is a major tourist hotspot although Namsan Tower itself is located in Jung-Gu, not Yongsan.

=== Itaewon Special Tourist Zone ===
The Itaewon area beside Yongsan Garrison was designated a special tourist zone in 1997 on account of popularity not only with US military personnel but also Koreans and foreign tourists and residents. According to Korean government data, 20,000 foreign residents live in the area. Itaewon's popularity began to diversify and increase in the 1980s as international attention focused on Seoul and the 1986 Asian Games and 1988 Summer Olympics. The area has around 2,000 shops and a large number of bars, clubs, restaurants and cafes. The focal point of the area is the intersection in front of the Hamilton Hotel, on top of Itaewon Station. From there, several different areas branch off to form distinct communities. Immediately to the north and spread towards HBC is a lively bar, club and eating area. To the south of the station are more shops and multi ethnic cuisines influenced by the presence of Seoul Central Mosque. This area has seen a large increase in the number of small shops selling clothes, jewellery and associated items, as well a large number of tailors who have historically catered for US military personnel. Every October, Itaewon Global Village Festival takes place in and around the area, with the focal point being on Itaewon-ro where live music performances are held and international food markets take place.

Close to Itaewon are Hangangjin and Hannam-dong. Both areas are known for their gentrified leisure-based economies with a large number of galleries, cafes and restaurants. Hannam-dong is also known for having the most expensive real estate prices in South Korea, with recent (2020) apartment prices reaching $6.16 million. Housing is this area is popular with corporate executives and other wealthy individuals. Galleria recently opened a new department store in Hannam-dong which is partially focused on VIP customers and luxury goods. The department store is incorporated into the Nine One Hannam apartment complex, a luxury housing development built on the site of housing previously used by US military and government personnel.

=== Yongridan-gil ===
Young people gathered in the alleyway of Han River-ro 2-ga between Yongsan Station and the triangular area since the establishment of AmorePacific New Building. The street, where cute cafes and restaurants remodeled nearby houses were created one by one, began to be called "Yongridan-gil." Various subway lines such as Yongsan Station, Shin Yong-san Station, and Triangle Zone exist around and are emerging as a hot place for young people as they belong to the axis where transportation is convenient.

== Transport ==
Yongsan Station (left) and the Raemian apartments (right). Sinyongsan metro station is to the right of the photo.

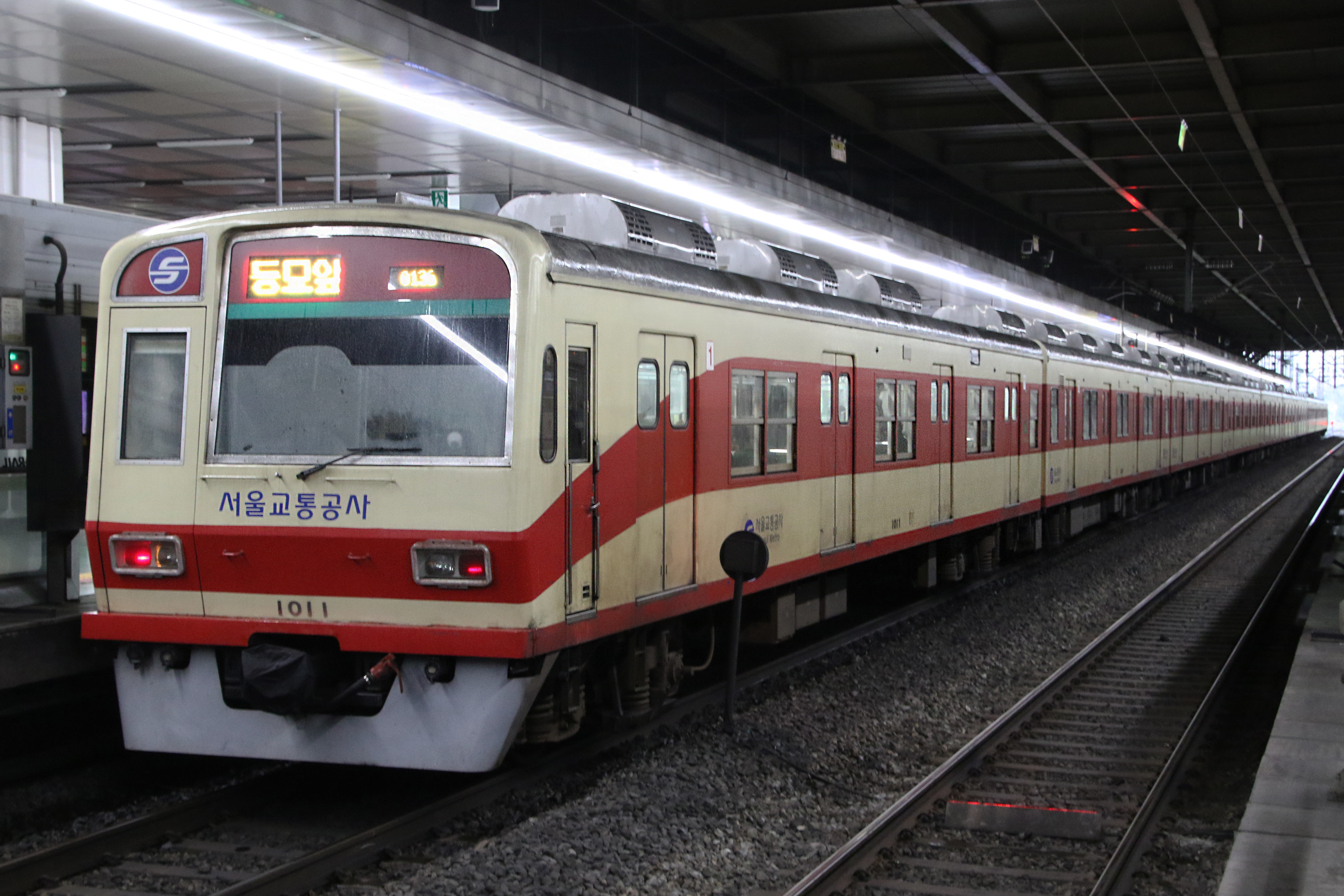
Line Metro train at Yongsan Station

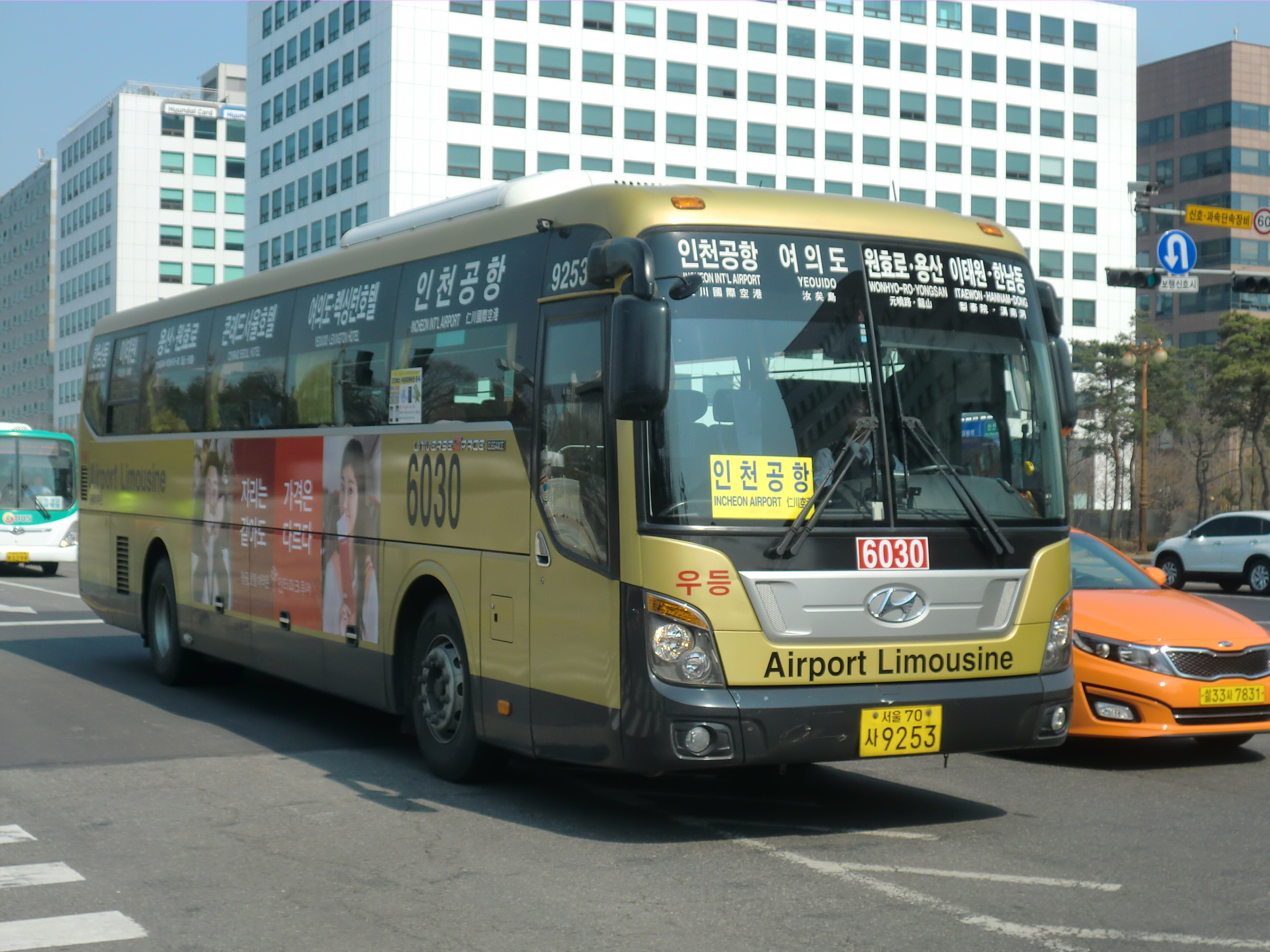
Airport Limousine Bus

=== Rail ===
Being centrally located within Seoul, Yongsan is host to two of Seoul's most important intercity rail stations – Seoul Station and Yongsan Station. Both stations serve KTX, ITX, Mugunghwa and tourist services connecting the district with most parts of the country. Given the fact that South Korea is effectively landlocked due to the lack of cross-border transport with North Korea, Seoul Station is the most northern and largest intercity rail station in the country, with only a handful of smaller commuter and tourism-focused stations to the north. The original Seoul Station building closed in 1988 and was replaced by the current structure which integrates the station building with a large Lotte Outlet's complex.

Yongsan Station, like Seoul Station, is a multipurpose facility which now consists of a duty free mall, department store and cinema. With the commencement of KTX services in 2004, Yongsan Station began to share these new services with Seoul Station and this gave rise to increased investment and development at the station.

=== GTX ===
Great Train Express is a planned high speed commuter rail network in the Seoul Capital Area project consisting of three separate lines, named GTX A, GTX B and GTX C, with the first two intended to serve Seoul Station (A & B) and Yongsan Station (B).

=== AREX ===
Seoul station is also served by AREX, the airport railroad. AREX began operations in 2007 and provides 'all-stop' (commuter) and 'express' (direct services from Incheon International Airport to Seoul Station) services. The service was extended in 2018 to serve the newly opened terminal 2 at Incheon International Airport.

=== Metro ===
Yongsan is served by Seoul Subway Line 1, Line 4, Line 6, and the Gyeonggi-Jungang Line. Lines 1 and 4 serve Seoul and Yongsan stations and provide inter-connectivity with intercity rail services. Meanwhile, Line 6 passes through the district on a west–east axis serving Samgajki and Itaewon and the Gyeonggi-Jungang Line serves Yongsan station and provides connections to outlying suburbs and satellite cities to the far west and east of Seoul.

=== Buses ===
Yongsan is served by all types of buses that operate in Seoul - green (local), blue (city), yellow (circulation buses around Namsan) and red (express). One of the largest bus stations in Yongsan is in front of Seoul Station.

=== Airport Limousine ===
Airport Limousine services 6030 and 6702 connect Yongsan with Gimpo and Incheon international airports. Due to the COVID-19 pandemic, these services have been suspended.

== Education ==
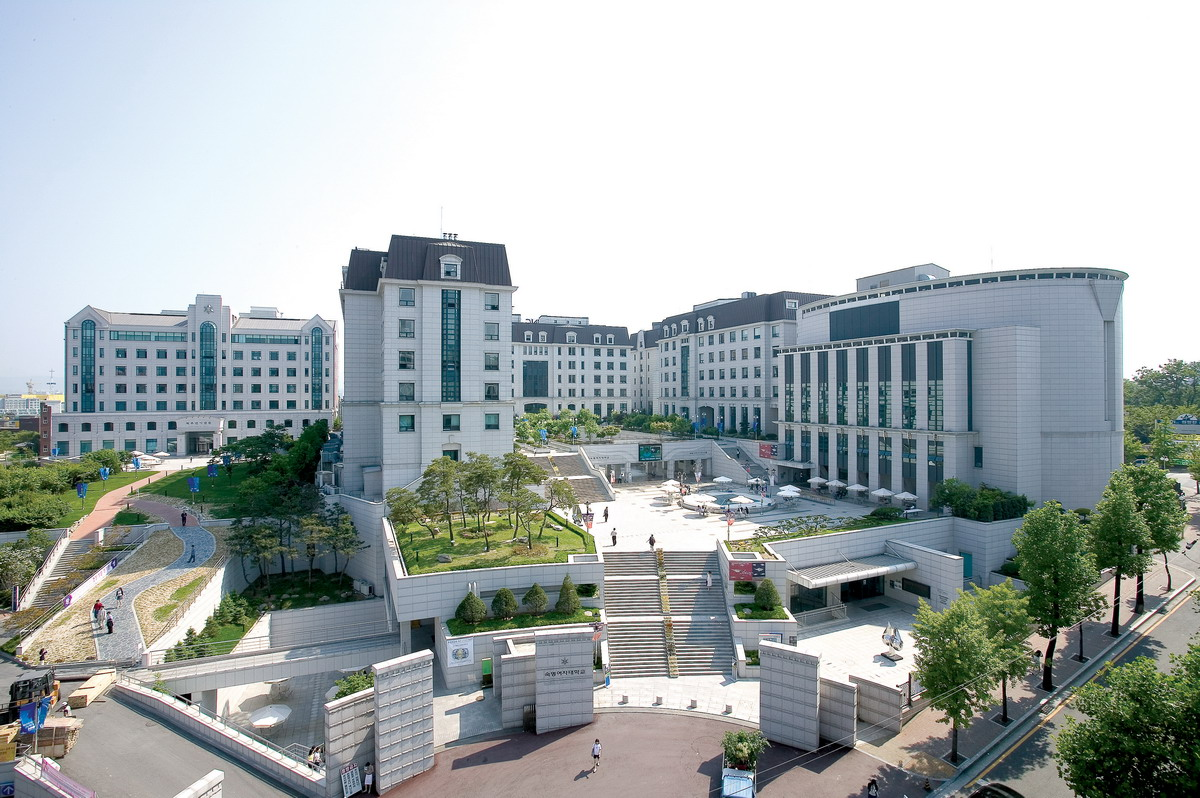
Sookmyung Women's University campus

=== Universities ===
Sookmyung Women's University is a private university in Yongsan. It was founded in 1906 and is considered one of the top women's universities in South Korea. The university has produced a considerable number of successful alumni in media, journalism, politics, governments, and academia and is also home to one of the first and now most successful women-only ROTC programs in the country. The university is well known for its business programs and also offers a Le Cordon Bleu Hospitality MBA course in cooperation with Le Cordon Bleu.

=== International schools ===
As a result of its large foreign community, Yongsan has several international schools catering for the children of diplomats and foreign professionals.

- German School Seoul International (Hannam-dong)
- Yongsan International School of Seoul
- Centennial Christian School
- Global Christian Foreign School ( 지구촌기독외국인학교)

The French School of Seoul was in Hannam-dong. In 1985 it moved to Seorae Village in Banpo-dong, Seocho District.

== Attractions ==
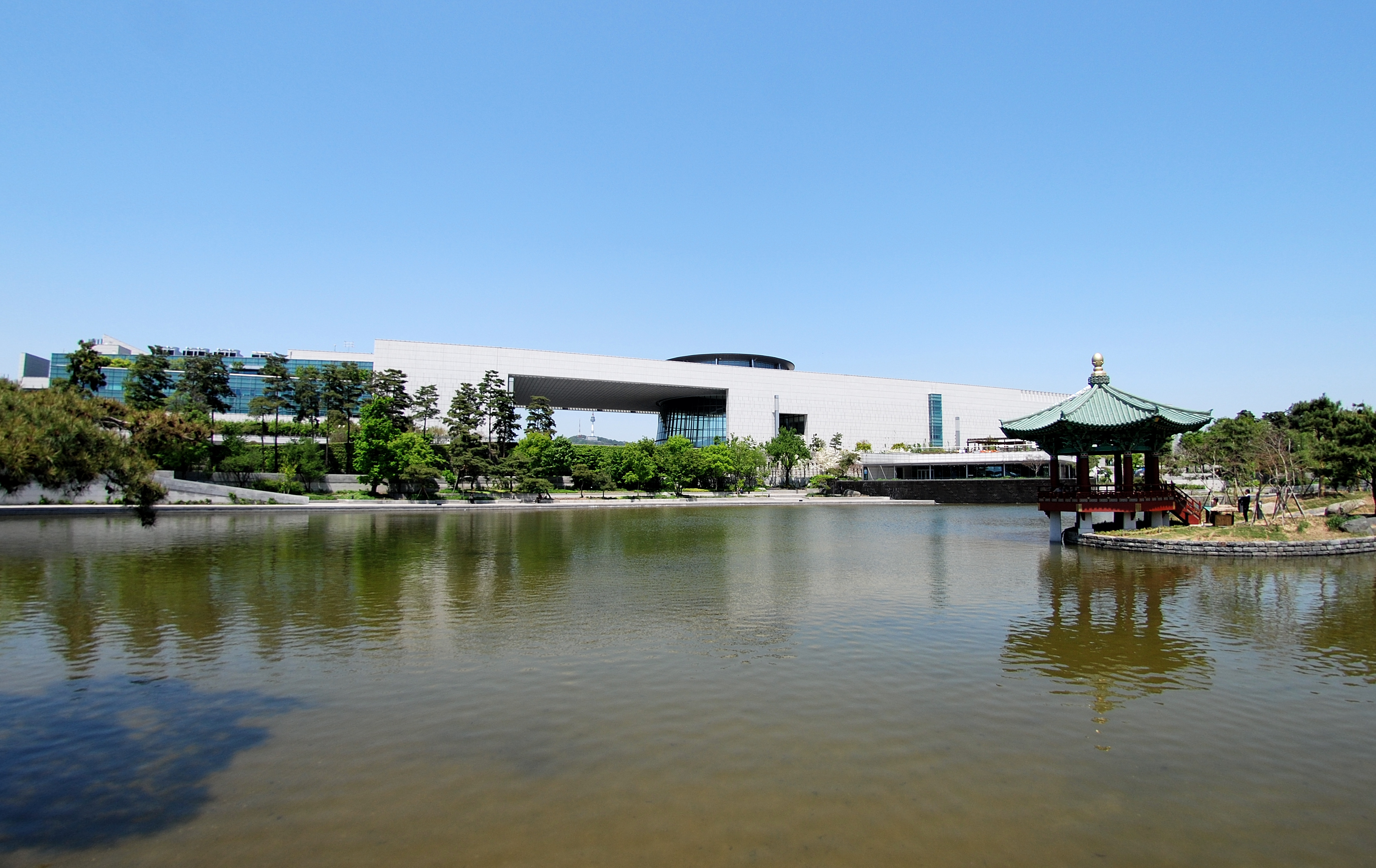
National Museum of Korea

- National Museum of Korea
- War Memorial of Korea
- Leeum, Samsung Museum of Art
- The Kim Koo Museum
- Seoul Central Mosque
- Ongamenet e-Sports Stadium

== Sister cities ==
- Dangjin, South Korea
- Sacramento, United States
- Shaoxing, China
- Xuanwu, China
- Quy Nhơn city, Bình Định province, Vietnam

== See also ==
- Itaewon
- Namsan
- Yongsan Garrison
- Yongsan Station
