= Seobinggo-dong =

Neighbourhood in Seoul, South Korea

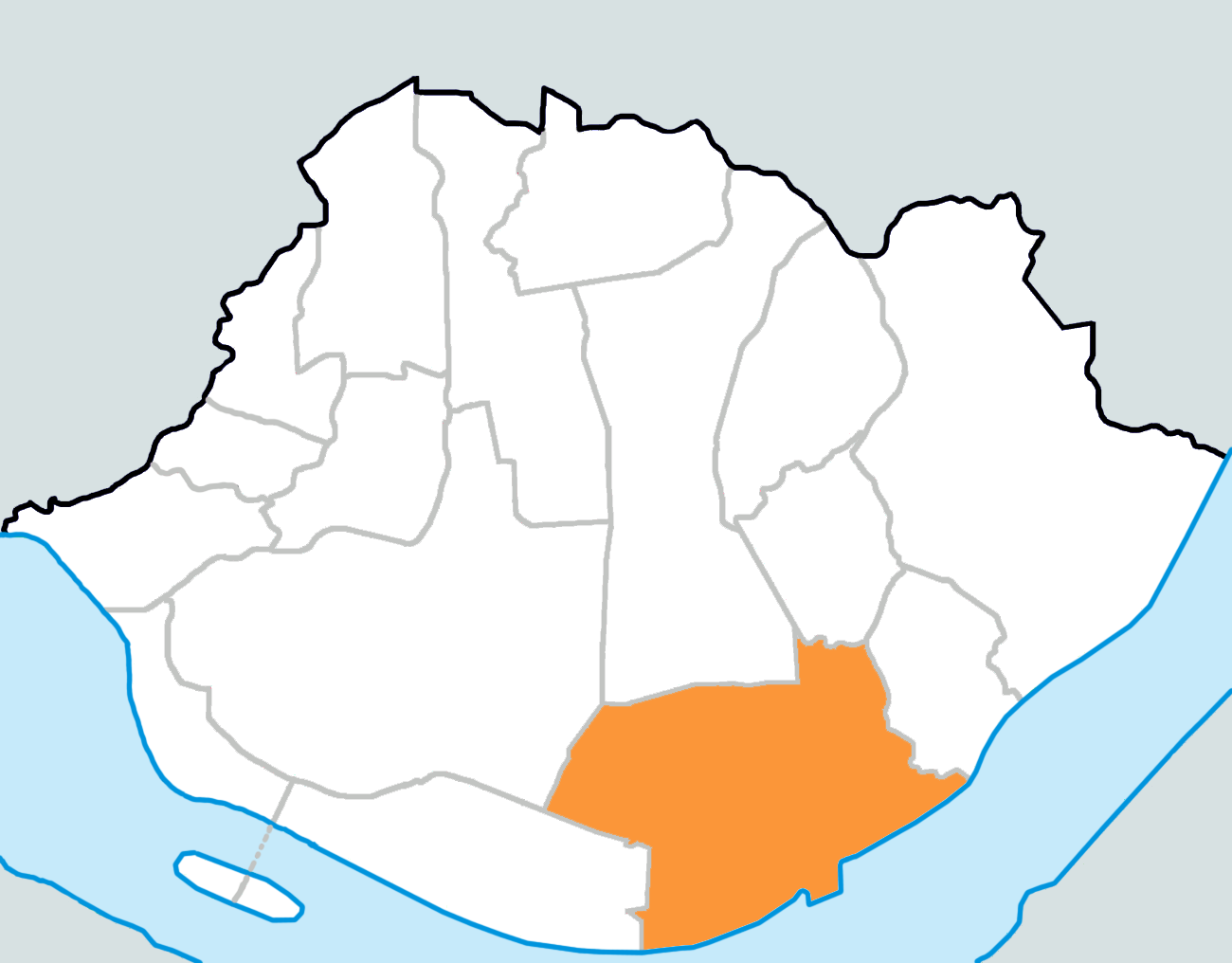
- Country: South Korea

Area
  - Total: 2.82 km^{2} (1.09 sq mi)

Population (2013)
  - Total: 14,023
  - Density: 4,970/km^{2} (12,900/sq mi)

Korean name
- Hangul: 서빙고동
- Hanja: 西氷庫洞
- RR: Seobinggo-dong
- MR: Sŏbinggo-dong

Seobinggo-dong (Korean: 서빙고동) is a dong (neighbourhood) of Yongsan District, Seoul, South Korea. It is directly across the river from Banpo-dong, Seocho District, with the Banpo Bridge connecting the two neighbourhoods.

Its Hanja name literally means "west ice storage house", a reference to the area's historic ice storage houses. In the past, ice had to be cut of the frozen Han River during the winter and stored in ice houses for use during the summer. The Seobinggo was opened by King Taejo during the early years of the Joseon period; the Dongbinggo ("east ice storage house") was likewise opened in present-day Oksu-dong, Seongdong District. The ice storage industry died out with the introduction of refrigeration technology during the 1950s but a marker at Seobinggo-ro 51-gil and an information sign at Hangang Banpo Park across the river were erected to commemorate the area's history and importance.

== See also ==
- Administrative divisions of South Korea
