= Hangangno-dong =

Neighborhood in Seoul, South Korea

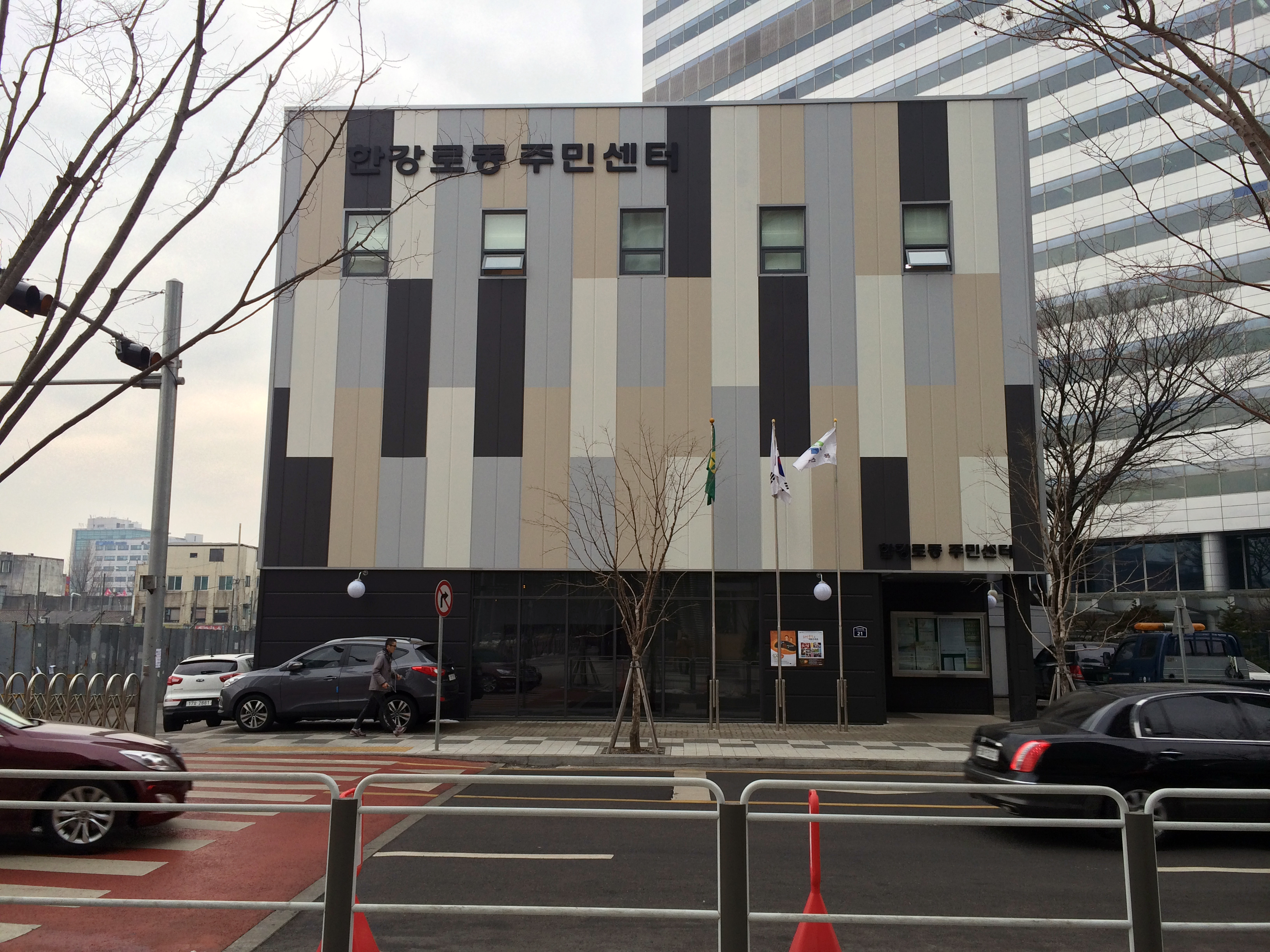
- Samgakji Intersection, Hangangno-dong Hangangno-dong Community Service Center

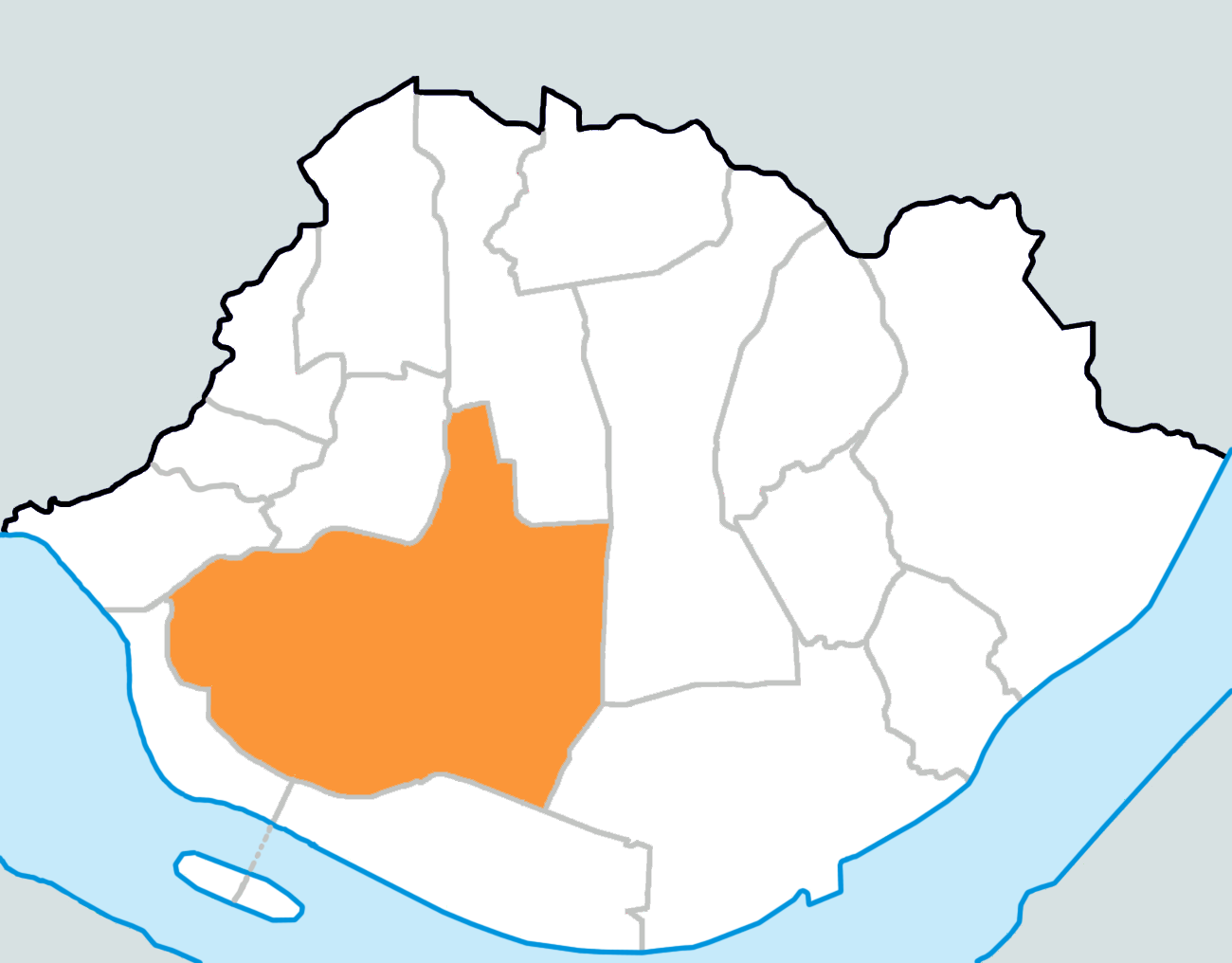
- Country: South Korea

Area
  - Total: 2.87 km^{2} (1.11 sq mi)

Population (2013)
  - Total: 15,304
  - Density: 5,330/km^{2} (13,800/sq mi)

Korean name
- Hangul: 한강로동
- Hanja: 漢江路洞
- RR: Hangangno-dong
- MR: Han'gangno-dong

Hangangno-dong (Korean: 한강로동) is a dong (neighborhood) of Yongsan District, Seoul, South Korea.

== Education ==
- Seoul Hangang Elementary School
- Seoul Yongsan Elementary School
- Yongsan Technical High School

== Transportation ==
- Yongsan Station of and of and KTX
- Samgakji Station of and of
- Sinyongsan Station of
- Ichon Station of and of

== See also ==
- Administrative divisions of South Korea
