= Ichon-dong =

Neighborhood in Seoul, South Korea

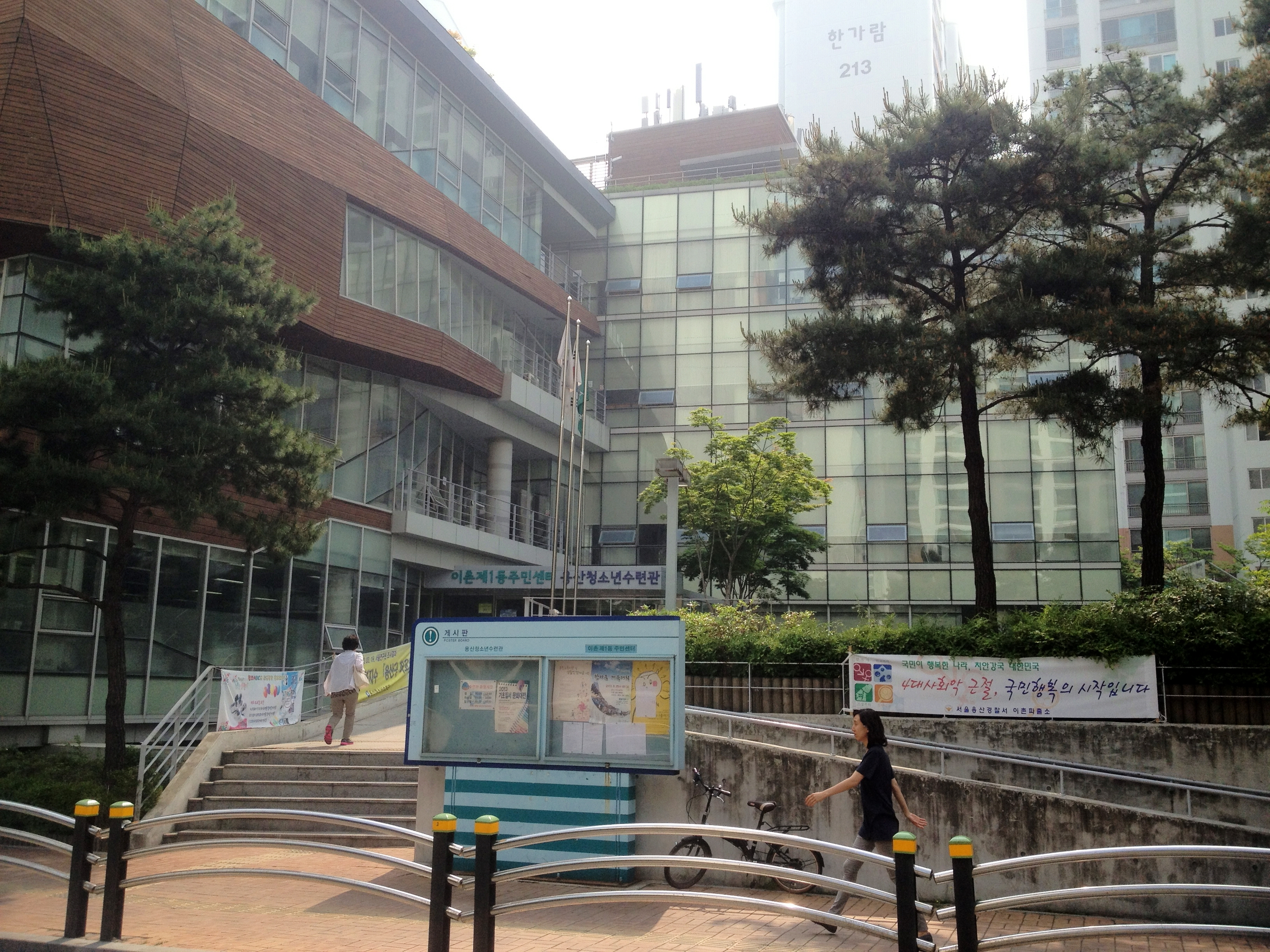
- Ichon 1-dong Community Service Center (Yongsan-gu)

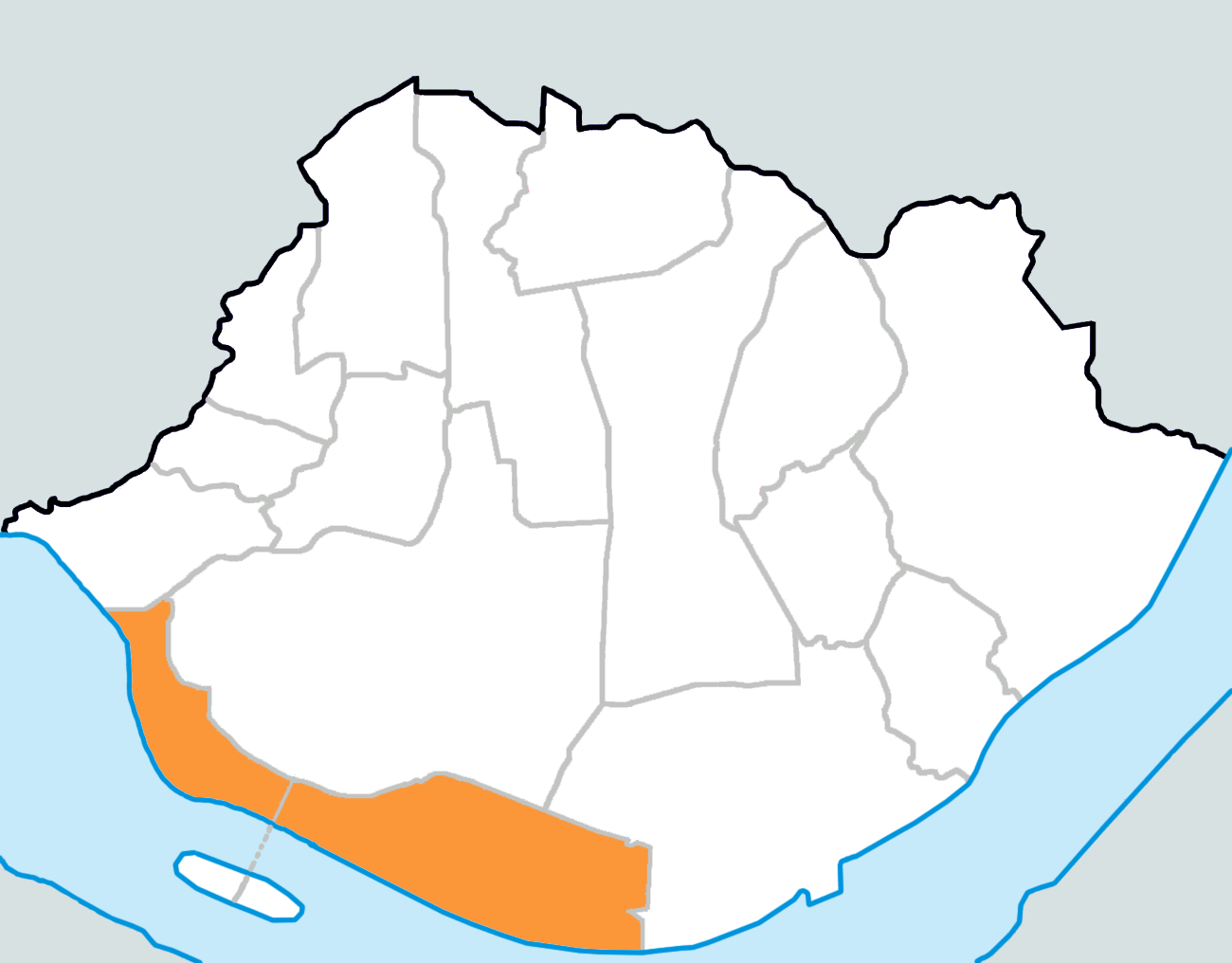
- Coordinates: 37.520°N 126.966°E
- Country: South Korea

Area
  - Total: 4.08 km^{2} (1.58 sq mi)

Population (Late August, 2023)
  - Total: 32,941
  - Density: 8,070/km^{2} (20,900/sq mi)

Korean name
- Hangul: 이촌동
- Hanja: 二村洞
- RR: Ichon-dong
- MR: Ich'on-dong

Ichon-dong (Korean: 이촌동) is a neighborhood of Yongsan District, Seoul, South Korea. It is located in the southwest of the city proper, along the Han River.

== Characteristics ==
Ichon-dong is split into two parts: Ichon 1-dong, formerly called 'East Ichon' (동부이촌동; 東部二村洞; Dongbu Ichon-dong), and Ichon 2-dong, formerly called 'West Ichon' (서부이촌동; 西部二村洞; Seobu Ichon-dong).

Residents of Ichon-dong are regarded as highly affluent by many Koreans. Ichon 1-dong is known for its expensive real estate. It is home to many foreign residents, especially Japanese. There are also many American expats, since the Yongsan Garrison is located nearby.

Ichon 2-dong is less developed than Ichon 1-dong, but the Seoul Metropolitan Government has been developing this area as a part of the Hangang Renaissance Project.

In Ichon-dong, the climate is cold and temperate. Ichon-dong is classified as Monsoon continental climate (Dwa) in the Köppen climate classification. The average annual temperature is 11.9 °C (53.4 °F), and the area receives about 1,346 mm (53.0 in) of precipitation annually, mostly in the summer.

== Landmarks ==
Ichon Hangang Park is located on the northern side of the Han River between Jungrangcheon Bridge and Wonhyo Bridge. The riverside path a popular course for a walk and family outing, and has seasonal flowers and plants such as reeds, eulalia, and cosmos. Within the park, there is the Teen Square, the X-Game center, an in-line skating rink, a basketball court, a tennis court, and a gateball field. The park also has a rafting program where visitors can cross the river in a rubber boat. The program is popular as a teamwork training center for school students and office workers. Other things to see and enjoy include a nature experience center, water sports, Cha Beom-Geun football class, and Nodleseom Island.

The National Museum of Korea is located only 1.5 km away from Yongsan Station. It is the largest museum in Korea and houses precious Korean cultural assets, both historic and modern. In addition to galleries with a wide array of national and international pieces, the National Museum of Korea is the stage for many cultural activities related to archeological collection and preservation, research and analysis, social training, academic publications, international cultural exchange programs, concerts, and more. Visitors have the opportunity to participate in a number of educational events and quality cultural programs.

The museum is near Yongsan Family Park, a wooded grassland with a pond that serves as a natural habitat for various species of birds, as well as over 80 different kinds of trees.

The War Memorial of Korea is located next to Samgakji Station, and 1 km from Yongsan Station. It displays a daunting array of collections and wartime relics.

== History ==
The neighborhood was originally a sandy field in the Han River. However, the area was prone to summer floods, which caused residents to move to the riverbank. Therefore, the area was originally named Ichon-dong (이촌동; 移村洞; lit. ''moving village neighborhood''), though the Hanja were later changed. The neighborhood has undergone numerous administrative changes since the Joseon Dynasty. Since the 1970s, the area has experienced rapid development by the government.

Ichon 1-dong is home to over one thousand Japanese residents, gaining the name "Little Tokyo." This village formed after Korea-Japan diplomatic normalization in 1965. Most of these residents are employees of Japanese corporations doing business in Korea or embassy personnel and their families.

== Education ==
Ichon-dong has three schools:

- Seoul Sinyongsan Elementary School
- Seoul Yonggang Middle School
- Jungkyung High School

== Notable people from Ichon-dong ==
- Park Si-eun, member of K-pop group STAYC.
- Jang Won-young, member of K-pop group IVE.

== See also ==
- Administrative divisions of South Korea
