= Yongsan Family Park =

Park in Seoul, South Korea

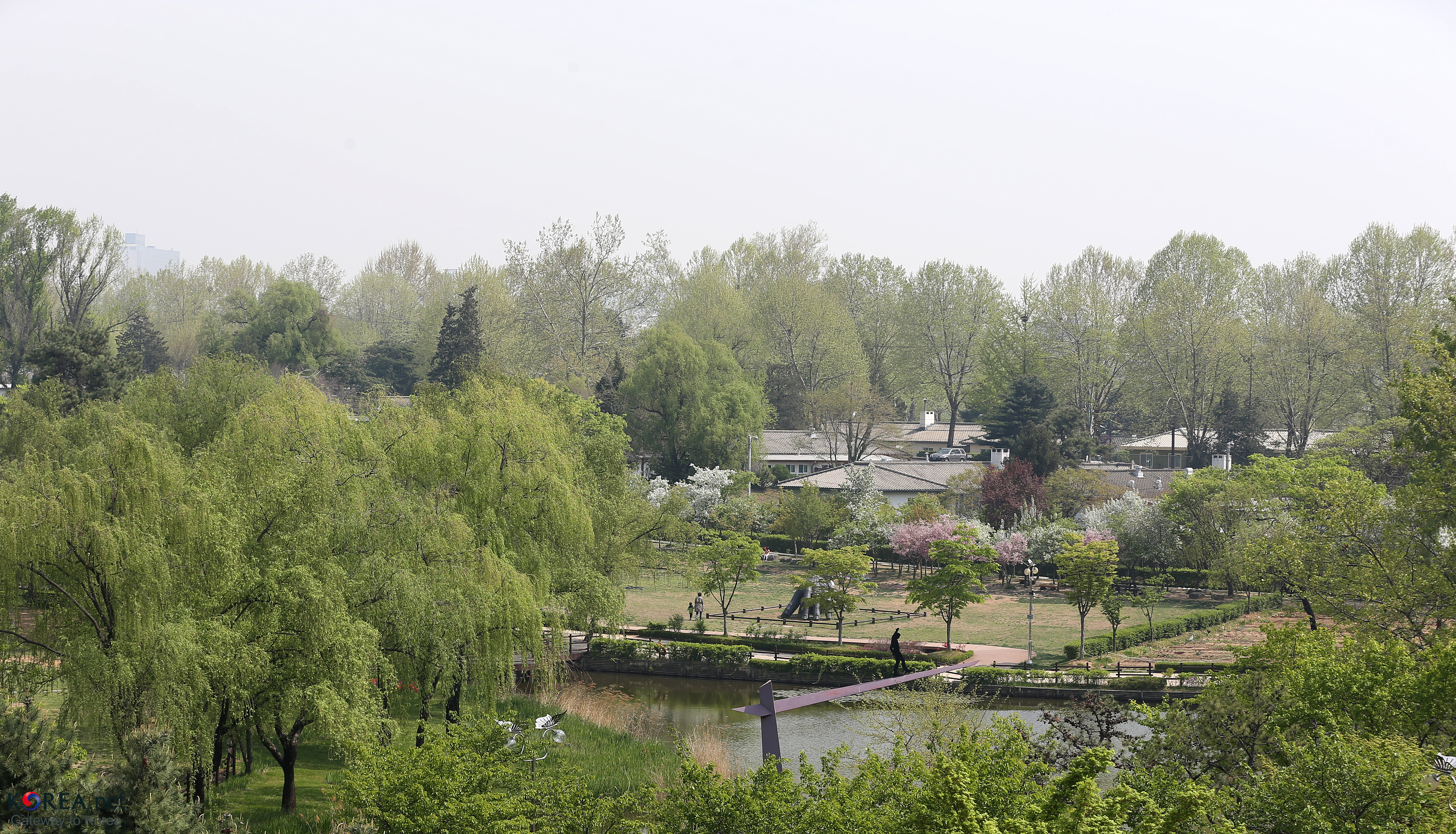
- Interactive map of Yongsan Family Park
- Type: Public
- Location: Yongsan District, Seoul
- Coordinates: 37°31′22″N 126°59′01″E
- Area: 75.900 hectares (187.55 acres)
- Established: November 1992
- Open: All hours, every day
- Parking: Onsite (50 spaces)
- Website: www.park.go.kr/front/index.do (in Korean)

Korean name
- Hangul: 용산가족공원
- Hanja: 龍山家族公園
- RR: Yongsan gajok gongwon
- MR: Yongsan kajok kongwŏn

Yongsan Family Park (Korean: 용산가족공원) is a park in Yongsan District, Seoul, South Korea. It is also known as Yongsan Park (용산공원).

The area of the park is 75,900 square metres (817,000 ft^{2}). It has a 2 km (1.2 mi) walking path and a variety of facilities, including Taegeukgi Park in the center. Pigeons and wild pheasants live in the park. Several ponds and lakes are in the park. It is open throughout the year, at all hours. There is a path in the park where guests are intended to walk it barefoot. It has a texture that is meant to perform acupressure on your feet.

During the Japanese colonial period, the park was used as a Japanese military facility from 1906 to the liberation of Korea in 1945. It was part of the US military base Yongsan Garrison, the headquarters of the US military in South Korea after the Korean War, including the base golf course. In December 1988, efforts began to convert the area into a civilian park via a presidential decree. The park opened in November 1992.

It is accessible from Ichon station on line number 2 and Seobinggo station on line number 1.
