= Ichon station =

Metro station in Seoul, South Korea

이촌 (국립중앙박물관); Ichon (National Museum of Korea)
이촌; Ichon
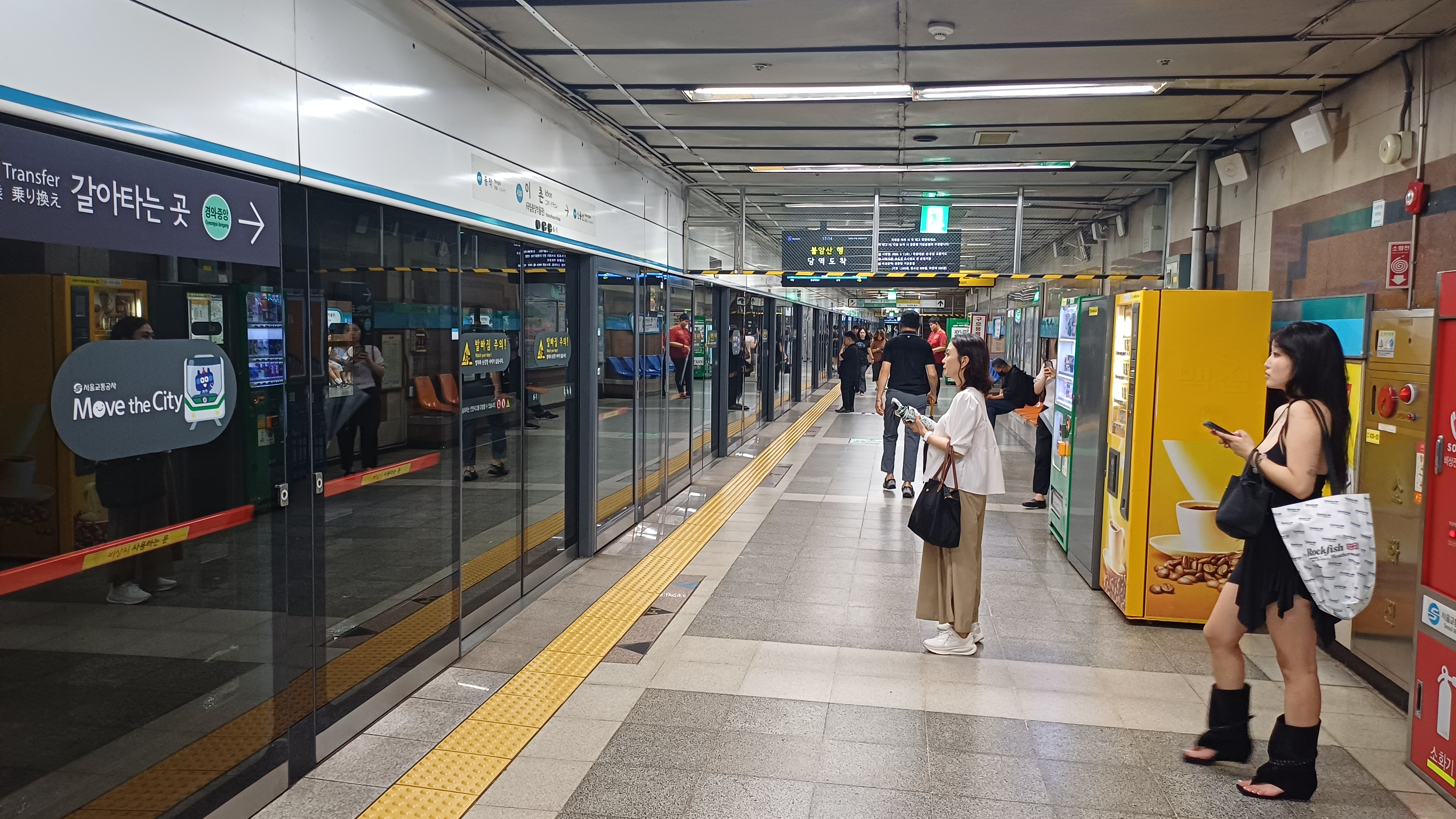
- Line 4 platform

Korean name
- Hangul: 이촌역
- Hanja: 二村驛
- RR: Ichon-yeok
- MR: Ich'on-yŏk

General information
- Location: Ichon-ro 71-gil 42, 83 Seobinggo-ro, Yongsan-gu, Seoul
- Coordinates: 37°31′21″N 126°58′23″E
- Operator: Seoul Metro; Korail
- Lines: Line 4 Gyeongui–Jungang Line
- Platforms: 4
- Tracks: 4

Key dates
- October 18, 1985: Line 4 opened
- December 9, 1978: Line 1 opened
- December 16, 2005: Gyeongui–Jungang Line began service, replacing Line 1
Location

Ichon station (Korean: 이촌역) is a station in Yongsan District, Seoul on Seoul Subway Line 4 and the Gyeongui–Jungang Line. This station is the closest to the National Museum of Korea, situated in the interior of Yongsan Family Park. It also serves eastern Ichon-dong, home to the largest Japanese community in South Korea with some 1,300 Japanese residents.

The Line 4 station is located in Yongsan-dong 5-ga and the Jungang Line station is located in Ichon-dong.

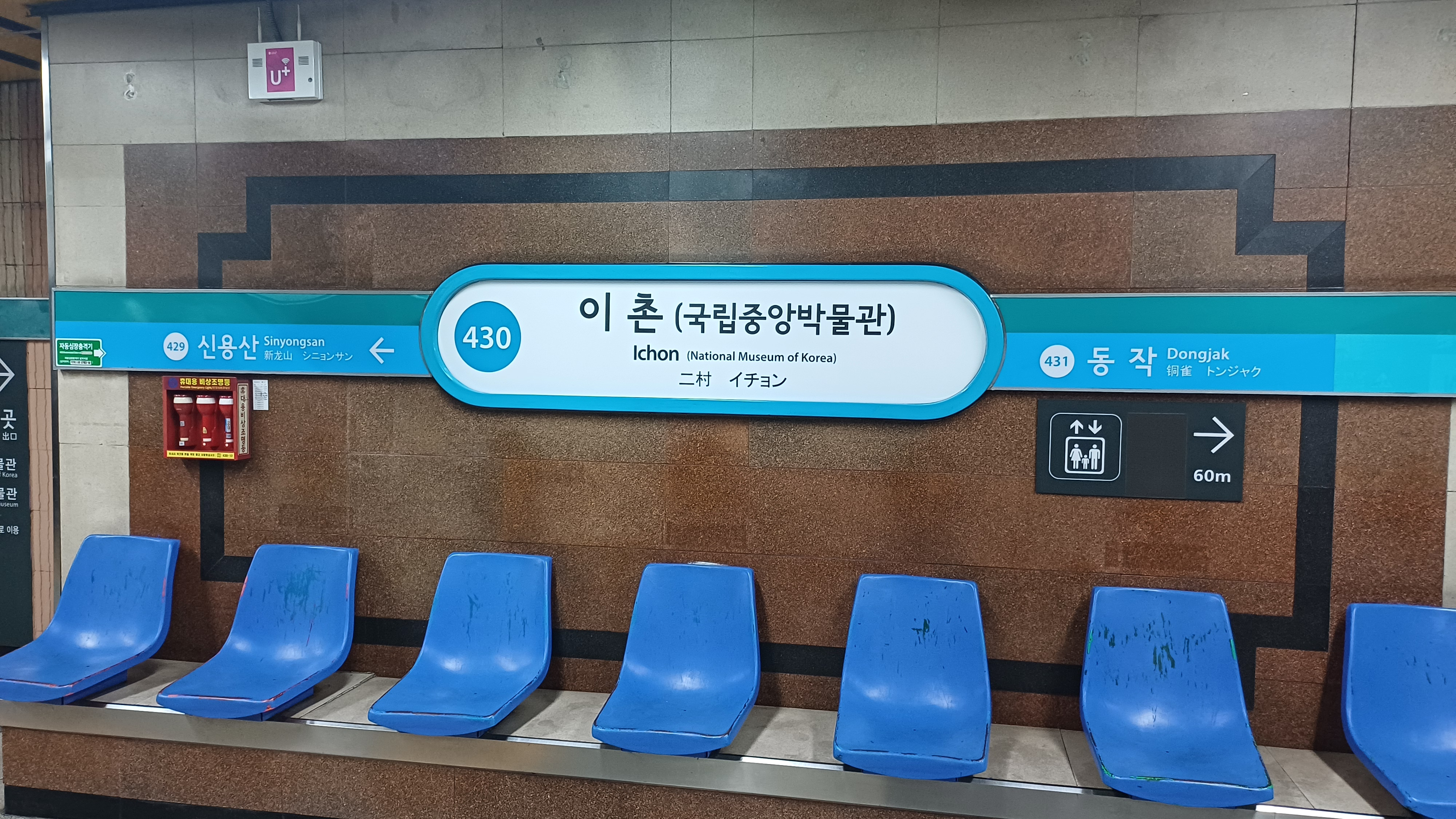
Line 4 station nameplate

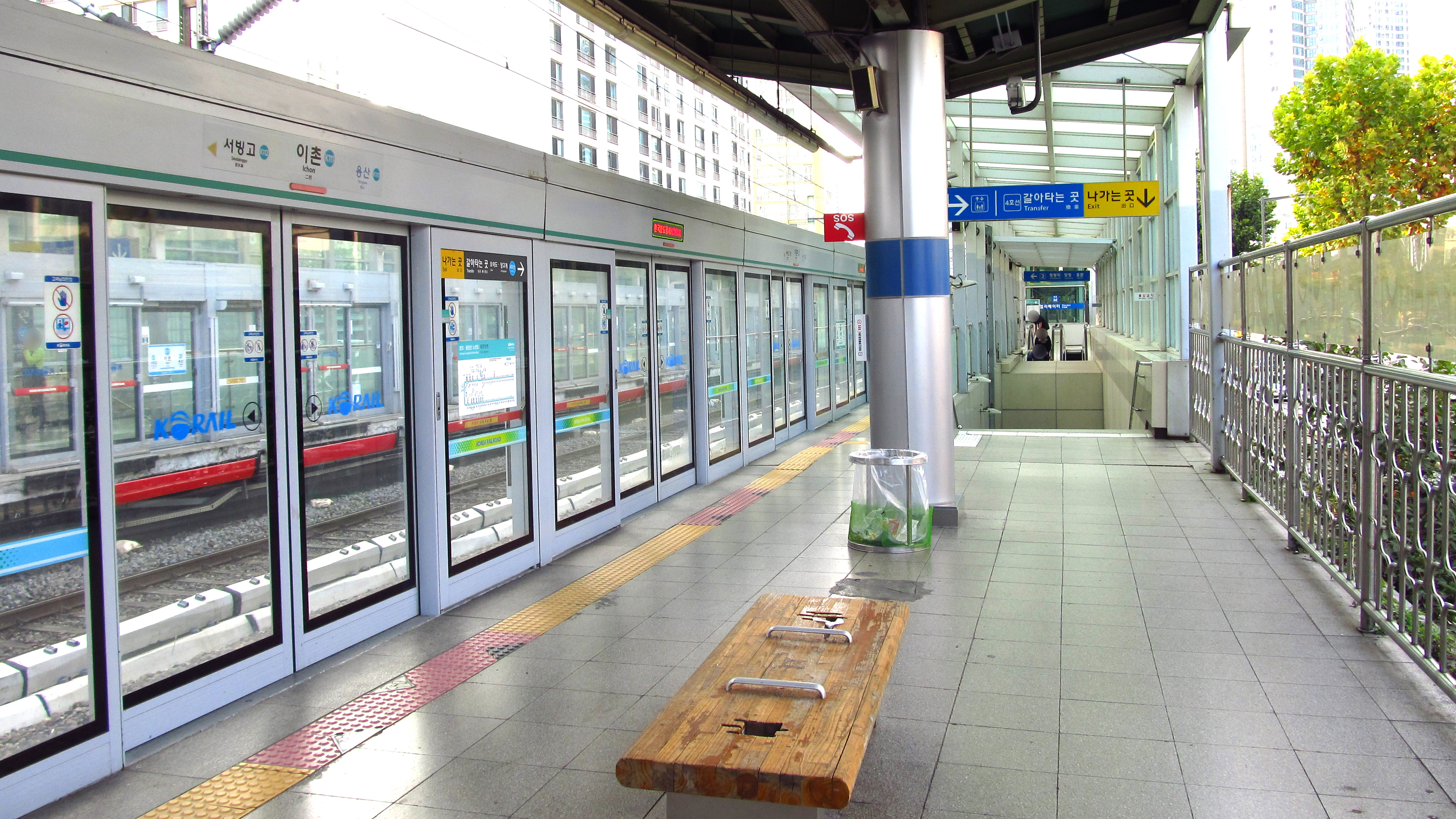
Gyeongui-Jungang Line platform

== Entrance ==
- Exit 1: Ward hall of Yongsan District
- Exit 2: Yongsan Family Park, Seobinggo-dong, National Museum of Korea - In case of overcrowding, use exit 1 instead
- Exit 3: Dongjak Bridge
- Exit 3-1: Ichon 1-dong, Sinyongsan Elementary School
- Exit 4: Townoffice of Ichon 1 dong, Jungkyung High School, Police office concerning Ichon 1-dong
- Exit 5: Yongsan tax office

Preceding station	Seoul Metropolitan Subway	Following station
Sinyongsan towards Jinjeop	Line 4	Dongjak towards Oido
Yongsan towards Munsan	Gyeongui–Jungang Line	Seobinggo towards Jipyeong
Yongsan towards Munsan	Gyeongui–Jungang Line Gyeongui Express	Seobinggo towards Yongmun
Yongsan towards Munsan	Gyeongui–Jungang Line Jungang Express	Oksu towards Yongmun
