= Seobinggo station =

Metro station in Seoul, South Korea

서빙고; Seobinggo
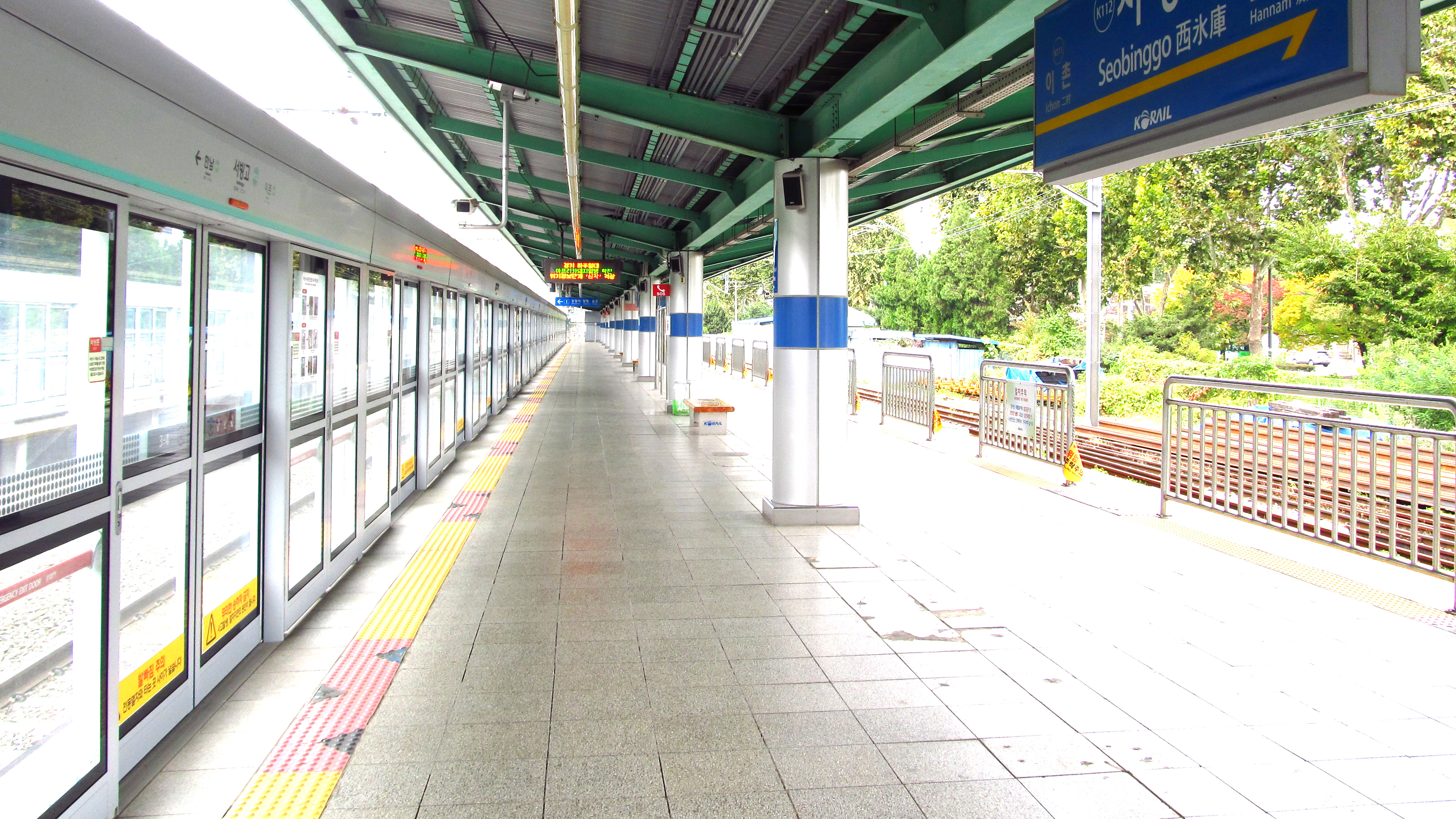
- Station platform

Korean name
- Hangul: 서빙고역
- Hanja: 西氷庫驛
- Revised Romanization: Seobinggo-yeok
- McCune–Reischauer: Sŏbinggo-yŏk

General information
- Location: 241-11 Seobinggo-dong, 238 Seobinggoro, Yongsan-gu, Seoul
- Coordinates: 37°31′10.45″N 126°59′18.81″E
- Operator: Korail
- Line: Gyeongui–Jungang Line
- Platforms: 2
- Tracks: 4

Construction
- Structure type: Aboveground

History
- Opened: October 1, 1917; December 9, 1978 (as part of Line 1)

Key dates
- December 16, 2005: Gyeongui–Jungang Line started service
Location

Seobinggo Station is a station on the Gyeongui–Jungang Line. It is located near the northern end of Banpo Bridge. The southeastern part of the Yongsan Garrison, a military base in Seoul, is served by this station. The Embassy of Turkey is close from Exit 1.

== Vicinity ==
- Exit 1: Seobinggo Elementary School, Turkish Embassy of Korea, Hangang Middle School
- Exit 2: Sindonga APT, Banpo Bridge, Jamsu Bridge

Preceding station	Seoul Metropolitan Subway	Following station
Ichon towards Munsan	Gyeongui–Jungang Line	Hannam towards Jipyeong
Ichon towards Munsan	Gyeongui–Jungang Line Gyeongui Express	Hannam towards Yongmun
