= Hannam station =

Metro station in Seoul, South Korea

한남; Hannam
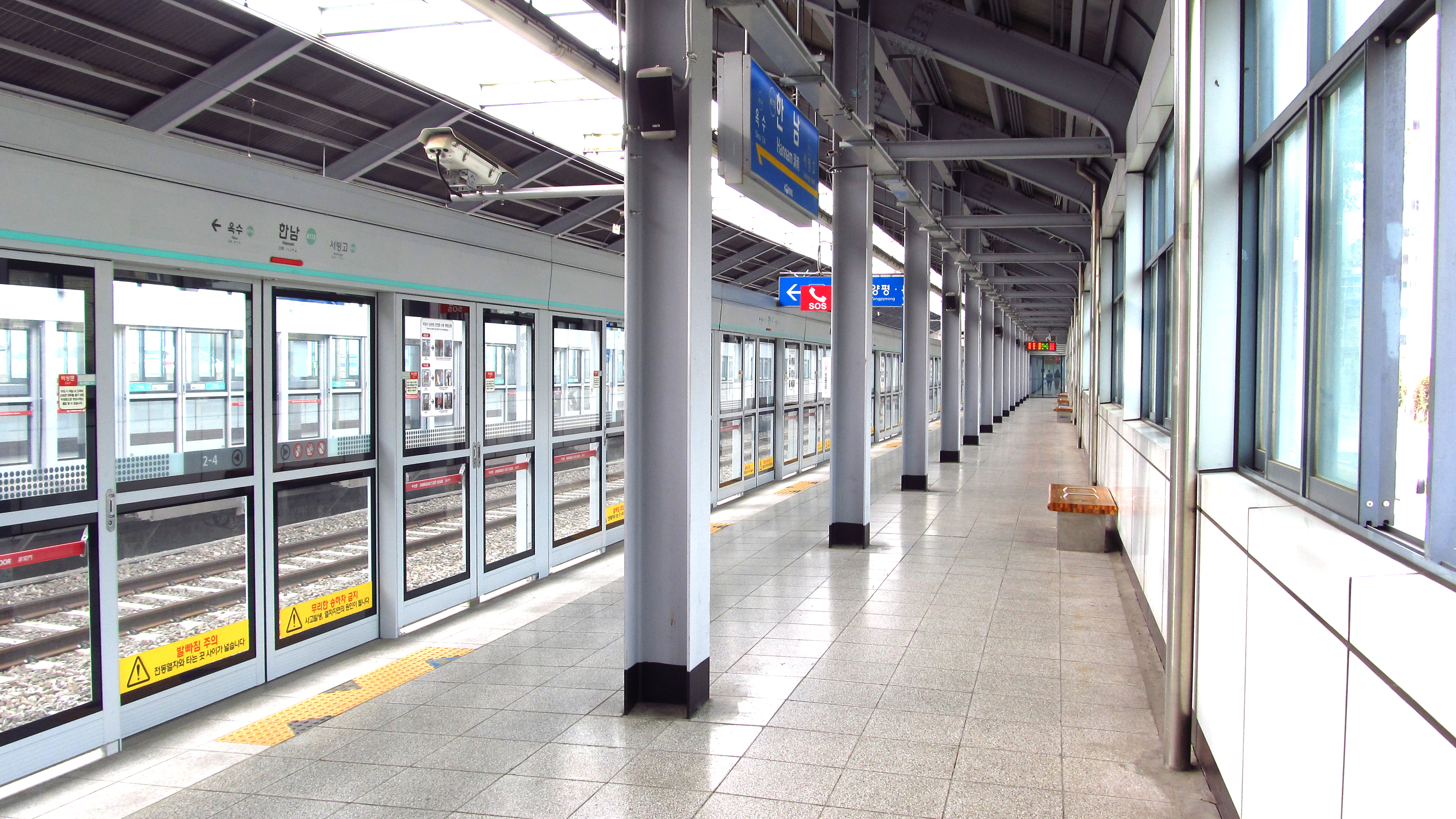
- Station platform

Korean name
- Hangul: 한남역
- Hanja: 漢南驛
- Revised Romanization: Hannam-yeok
- McCune–Reischauer: Hannam-yŏk

General information
- Location: 511 Hannam-dong, 12-13 Dokseodangno 6 gil, Yongsan-gu, Seoul
- Coordinates: 37°31′44.87″N 127°0′29.15″E
- Operator: Korail
- Line: Gyeongui–Jungang Line
- Platforms: 2
- Tracks: 2

Construction
- Structure type: Aboveground

History
- Opened: April 1, 1980 (as part of Line 1)

Key dates
- December 16, 2005: Gyeongui–Jungang Line started service
Location

Hannam station is a station on the Gyeongui–Jungang Line. It is located on the northwestern end of the Hannam Bridge, overlooking the Han River. It was also called Dankook University station until 2007, when Dankook University moved the majority of its campus to the suburban city of Yongin.

The neighborhood of Hannam-dong is home to various nations' embassies in Korea, and many can be accessed from this station, with the closest being the embassy of Slovakia.

== Station layout ==
G	Street level	Exit

L1; Concourse	Lobby	Customer service, shops, vending machines, ATMs

L2; Platform	Side platform, doors will open on the right
L2; Platform	Northbound	← Gyeongui–Jungang Line toward Munsan (Seobinggo)
L2; Platform	Southbound	Gyeongui–Jungang Line toward Jipyeong (Oksu)
L2; Platform	Side platform, doors will open on the left

Preceding station	Seoul Metropolitan Subway	Following station
Seobinggo towards Munsan	Gyeongui–Jungang Line	Oksu towards Jipyeong
Seobinggo towards Munsan	Gyeongui–Jungang Line Gyeongui Express	Oksu towards Yongmun
