= Oksu station =

Train station in South Korea

옥수; Oksu
옥수
Oksu
옥수; Oksu
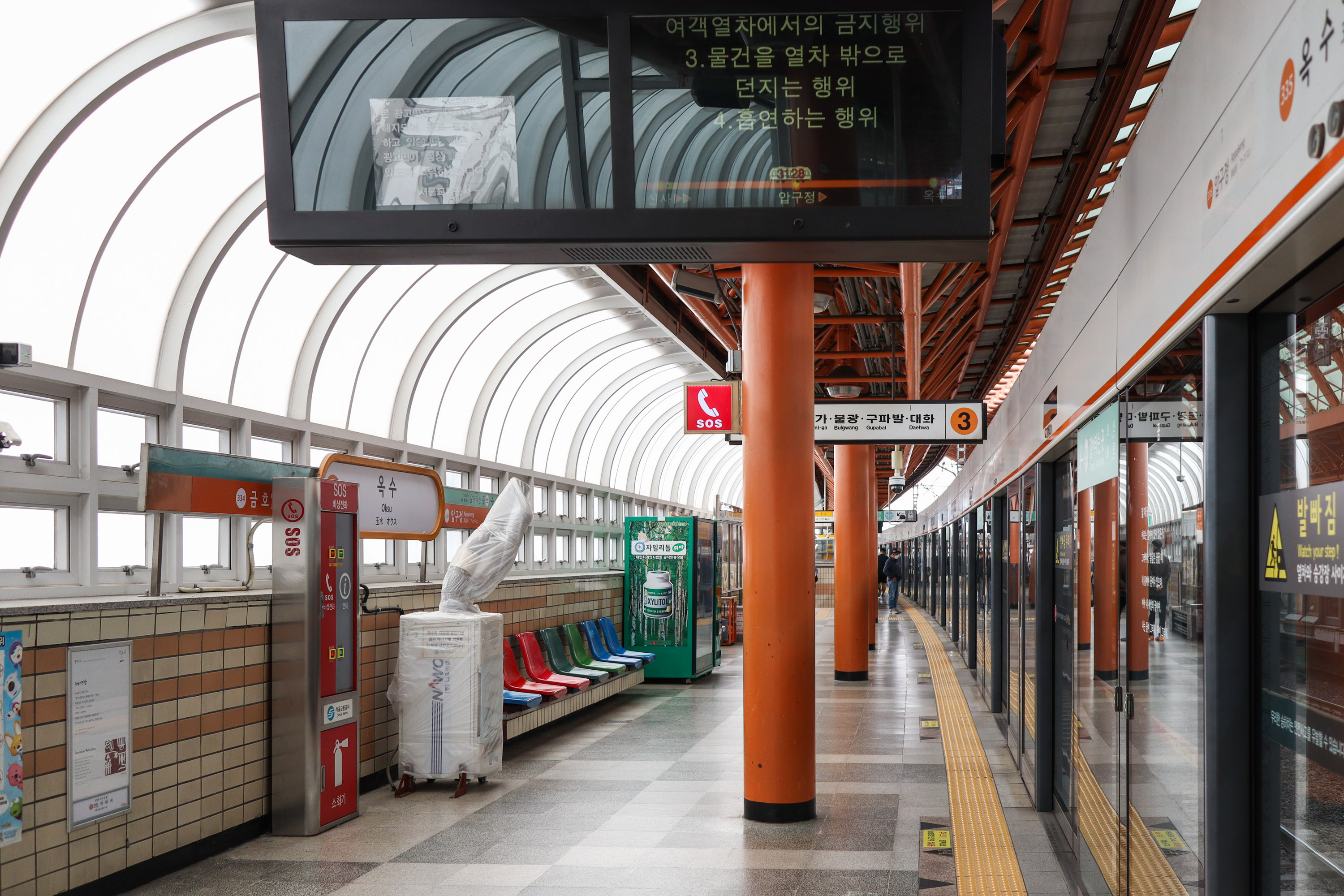
- Line 3 platform (2022)

Korean name
- Hangul: 옥수역
- Hanja: 玉水驛
- RR: Oksu-yeok
- MR: Oksu-yŏk

General information
- Location: 21 Dongho-ro, Seongdong-gu, Seoul
- Coordinates: 37°32′26″N 127°01′08″E
- Operator: Seoul Metro; Korail
- Lines: Line 3 Gyeongui–Jungang Line
- Platforms: 4
- Tracks: 4

Construction
- Structure type: Aboveground

Key dates
- October 18, 1985: Line 3 opened
- October 18, 1985: Line 1 opened
- December 16, 2005: Gyeongui–Jungang Line began service, replacing Line 1

Passengers
- (Daily) Based on Jan-Dec of 2012. Line 3: 19,062
Location

Oksu Station is a railway interchange station on the Line 3 and the Gyeongui–Jungang Line (this section formerly part of Line 1 until 2005). It was opened in 1985 and is located near the confluence of the Han and Jungnang Rivers.

The Line 3 platforms are one of four aboveground stations on Line 3 (The others are Jichuk, Wondang, and Daegok). The Gyeongui–Jungang line part was recently renovated with a glass-covered top which lets in sunlight. It has a view of the Han River and is often seen in movies and advertisements. The 2011 manhwa webtoon Oksu Station Ghost and its 2022 movie adaptation are set at the Line 3 platforms.

== Gallery ==
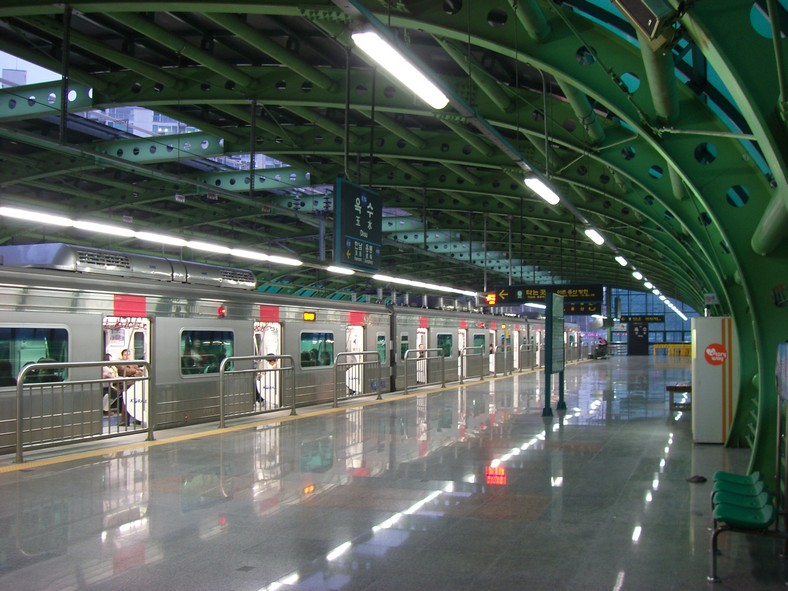
Jungang Line platform (December 2007, before PSD retrofit)

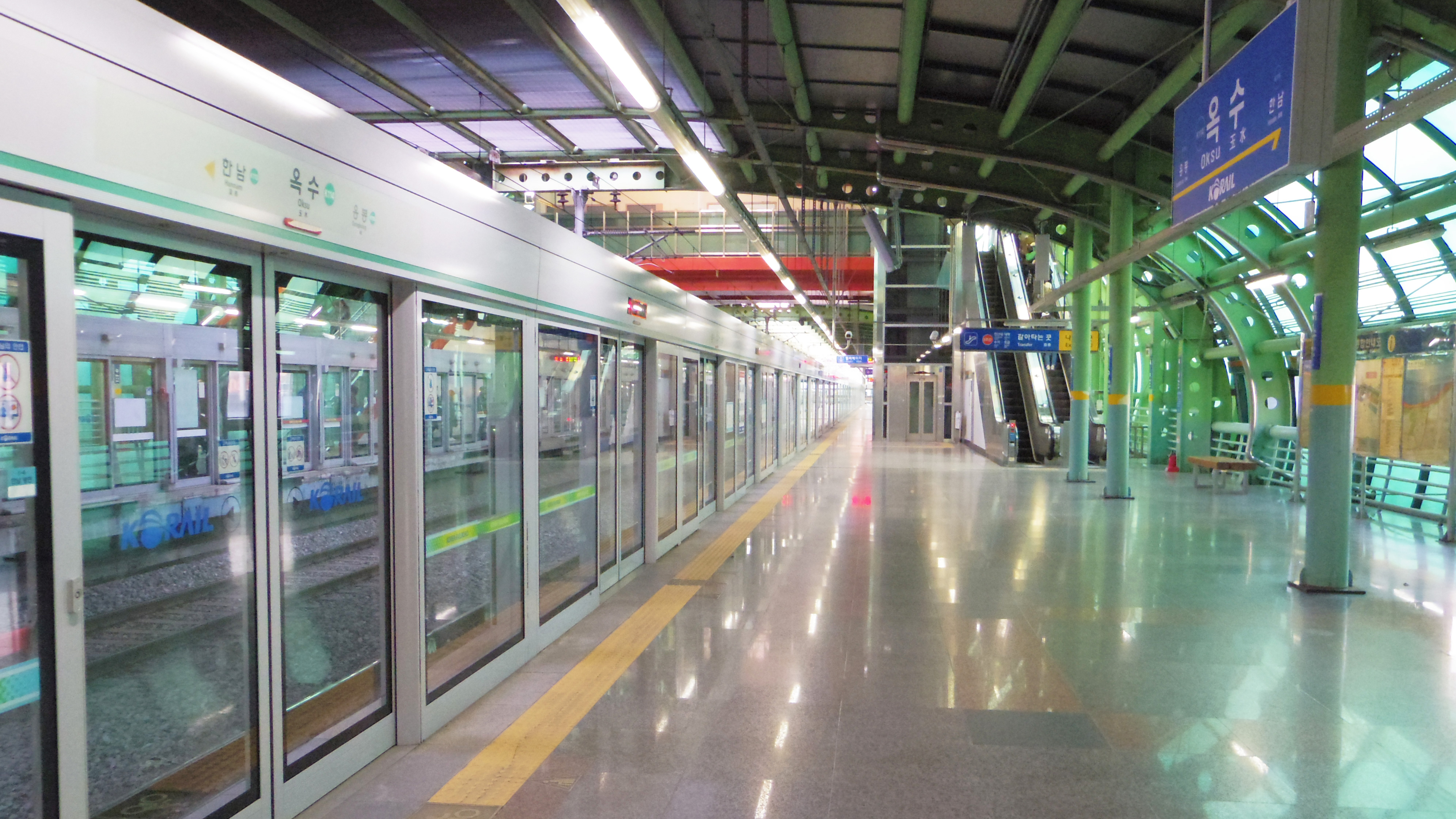
Gyeongui–Jungang Line platform (2018)

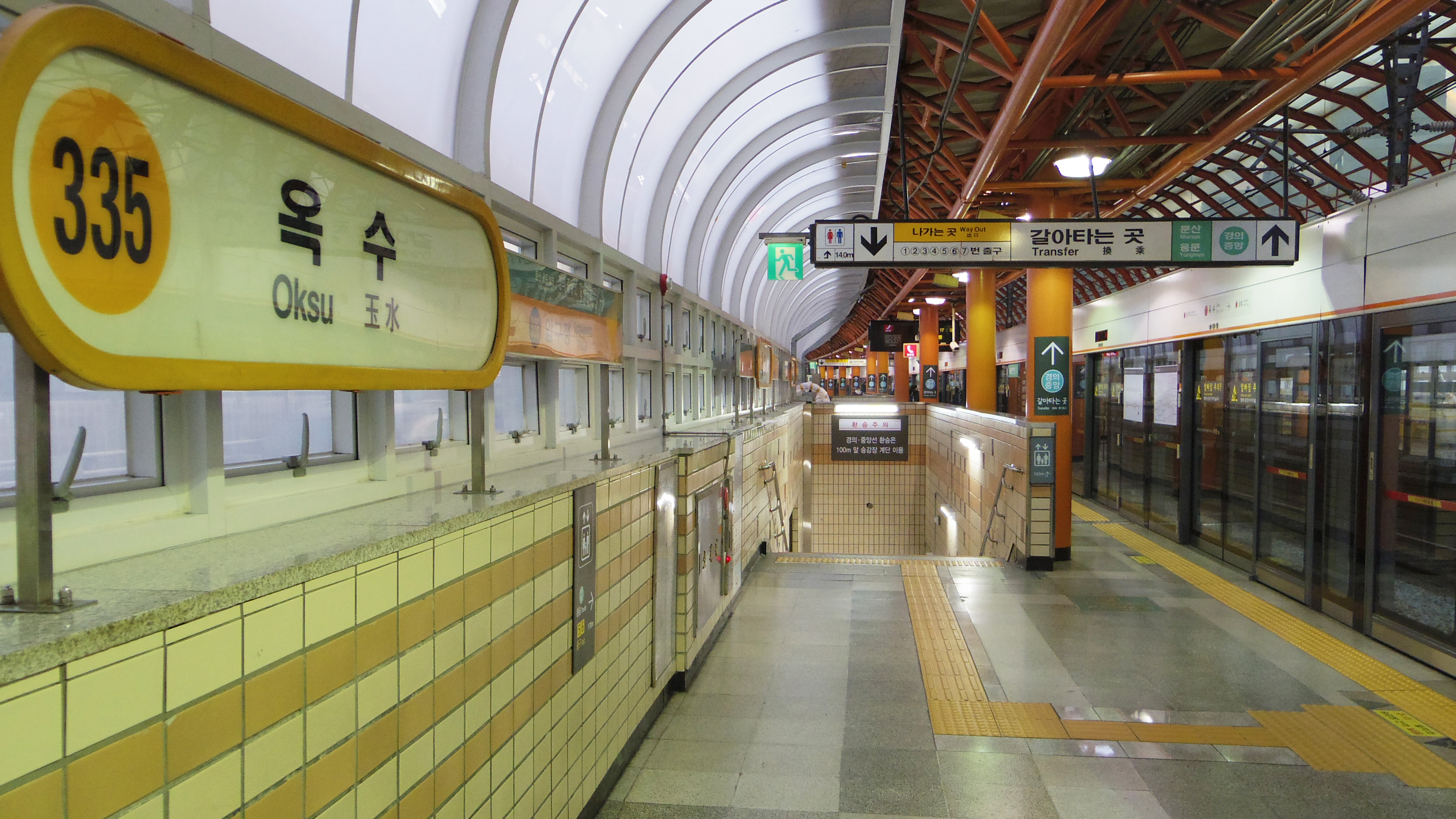
Line 3 platform (2018)

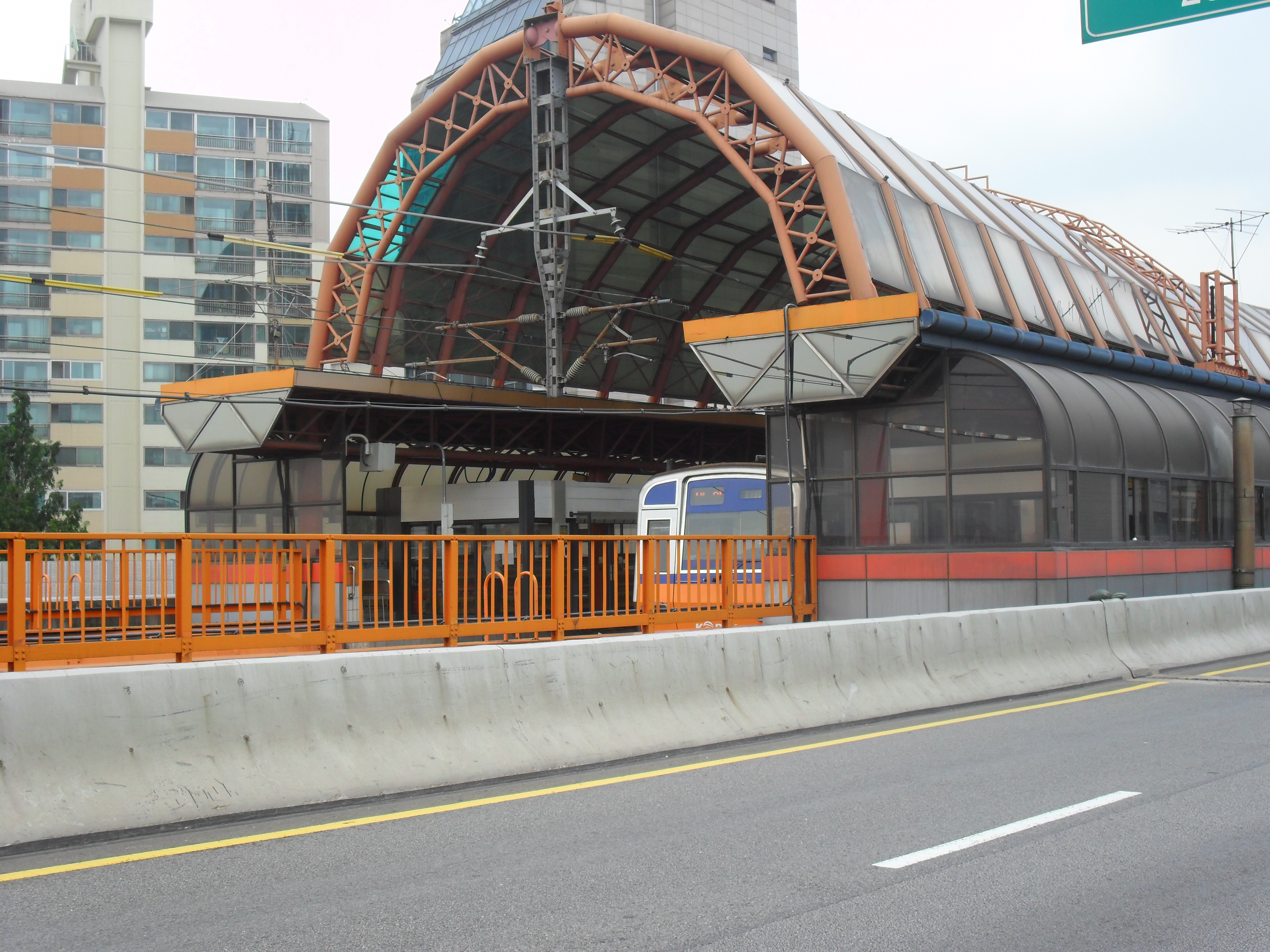
Line 3 station exterior

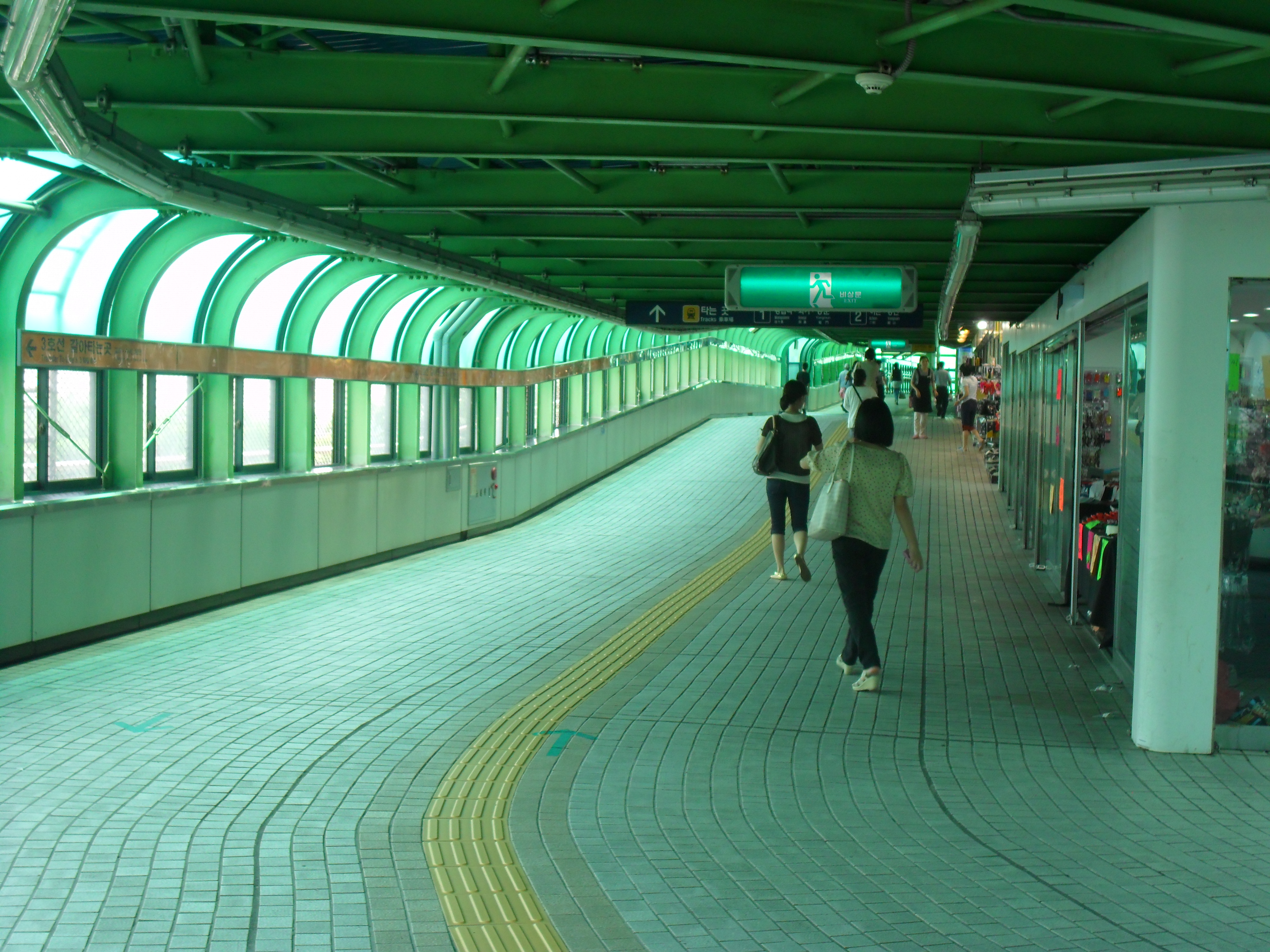
Transfer corridor

== Neighborhood ==
- Okjeong Elementary School: Exit 5
- Malaysian Embassy: Exit 4, 15 minutes walk.

Preceding station	Seoul Metropolitan Subway	Following station
Geumho towards Daehwa	Line 3	Apgujeong towards Ogeum
Hannam towards Munsan	Gyeongui–Jungang Line	Eungbong towards Jipyeong
Hannam towards Munsan	Gyeongui–Jungang Line Gyeongui Express	Eungbong towards Yongmun
Ichon towards Munsan	Gyeongui–Jungang Line Jungang Express	Wangsimni towards Yongmun
Preceding station	Korail	Following station
Yongsan Terminus	ITX-Cheongchun	Wangsimni towards Chuncheon
