= Monsoon continental climate =

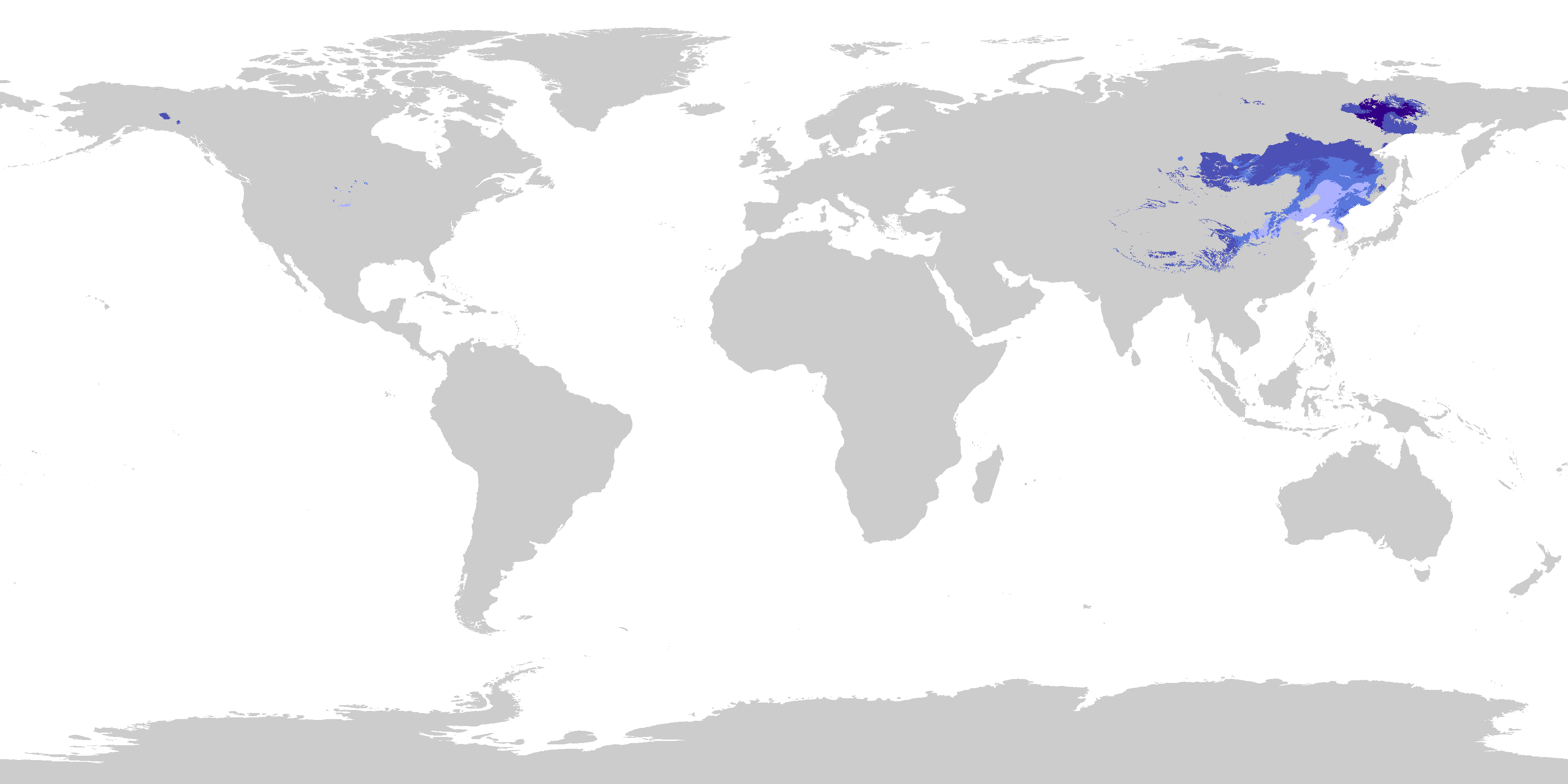
Manchurian or monsoon continental climate in the world as of 1991-2020, using a threshold of −3 °C (27 °F) for the coldest month.: Dwa; Dwb; Dwc; Dwd

The Monsoon continental climate, also known as Manchurian climate, is a continental climate sub-type. It is a monsoon climate with a large thermal range. It is located mainly in East Asia, Korea and Manchuria. Its dry season happens during the winter (The “w” in “Dw” stands for “winter”).

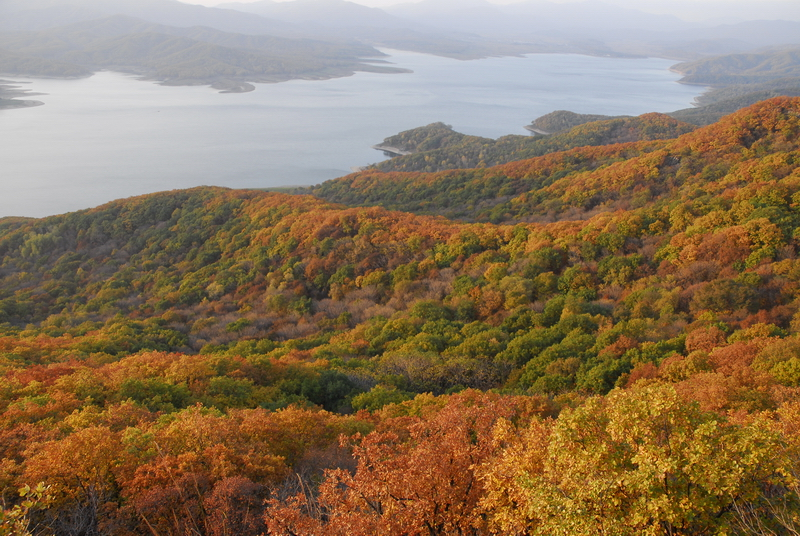
Caducifolio forest, Songhua Lake, Manchuria.

== Sub-types ==
There are four subtypes of the monsoon continental climate, determined by the third letter (Dwx)

- Hot-summer monsoonal continental climate (Dwa): Mean temperature is below 0 °C (32 °F) in the coldest month. Mean temperature is above 22 °C (72 °F). Winter is very dry compared to summer. This climate is located in Northeast China and the Korean Peninsula. (Examples: Beijing, Harbin, Shenyang, Pyongyang, Seoul, North Platte)
- Warm-summer monsoonal continental climate (Dwb): Mean temperature is below 0 °C (32 °F) in the coldest month. Mean temperature is below 22 °C (72 °F) in the hottest month, but at least 4 months are above 10 °C (50 °F). Winter is very dry compared to summer. This climate is located in Northeast China, far southeastern Siberia, other parts of the Korean Peninsula, a very small part of Alberta, and North Dakota. (Examples: Heihe, Yanji, Vladivostok, Khabarovsk, Irkutsk, Calgary, Thief River Falls)
- Subarctic monsoonal climate (Dwc): Mean temperature is below 0 °C (32 °F) in the coldest month. Mean temperature is below 22 °C (72 °F) in the hottest month, but between 1 and 3 months are above 10 °C (50 °F). Winter is very dry compared to summer. This climate is located in parts of Canada, Mongolia, and Russia. (Examples: Mohe, Tsetserleg, Delta Junction)
- Severe-winter subarctic monsoonal climate (Dwd): Mean temperature is below −38 °C (−36 °F) in the coldest month. Mean temperature is below 22 °C (72 °F) in the hottest month, but between 1 and 3 months are above 10 °C (50 °F). Winter is very dry compared to summer. This climate is located in a small zone of Siberia. (Examples: Allakh-Yun, Delyankir)

== See also ==
- Continental climate
- Humid continental climate
- Continental mediterranean climate
- Köppen climate classification
