= Yongsan Garrison =

Area of Seoul, South Korea; former US Army base

Coordinates: 37°32′N 126°59′E

U.S. Army Garrison Yongsan
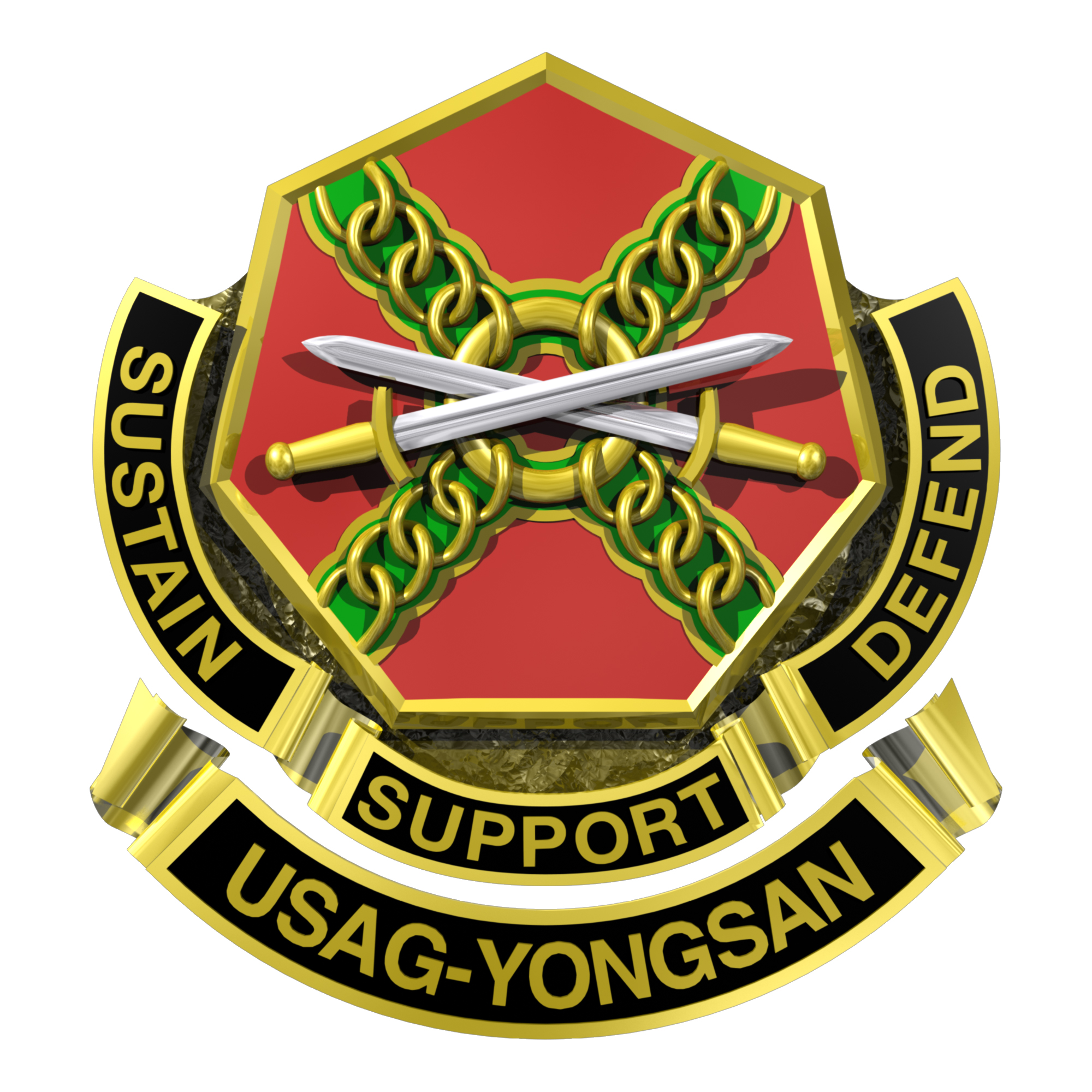
- Founded: October 2006; 20 years ago
- Country: United States; South Korea
- Branch: United States Army
- Type: Army garrison
- Part of: Eighth United States Army; Installation Management Command
- Garrison/HQ: Seoul, South Korea
- Nickname: "The Army's Home in Korea"
- Mottos: "Sustain, Support, Defend!", "We are The Army's Home in Korea!"
- Colors: Red, green, black & gold
- Website: www.army.mil/yongsan/

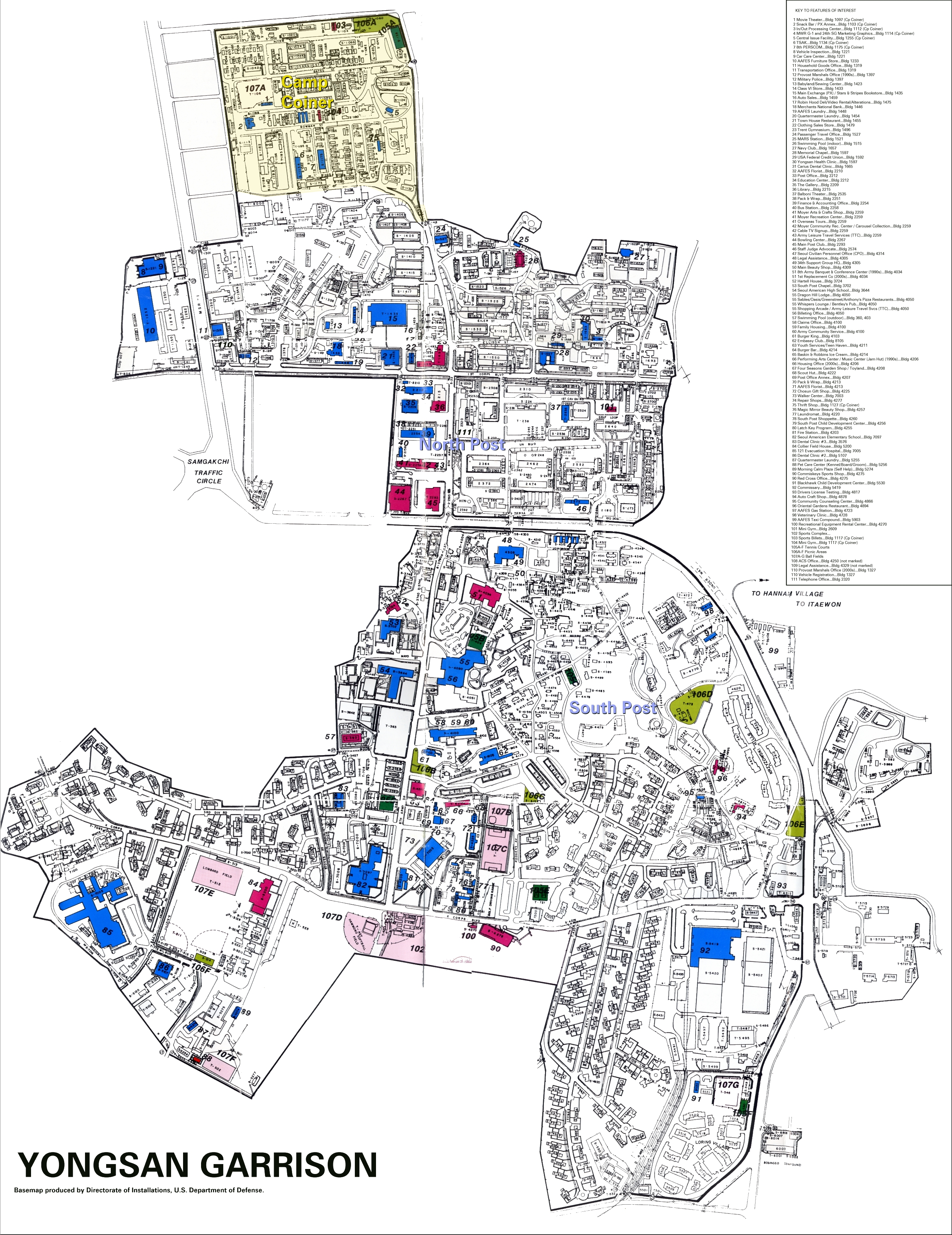
An ichnography of USAG Yongsan. The yellow area at the top is Camp Coiner.

Yongsan Garrison (Korean: 용산기지; Hanja: 龍山基地), meaning "dragon hill garrison", is an area located in the Yongsan District of central Seoul, South Korea. The site served as the headquarters for U.S. military forces stationed in South Korea, known as United States Forces Korea (USFK), and as United States Army Garrison Yongsan (USAG-Yongsan) until 2018, under the supervision of the U.S. Army's Installation Management Command Pacific Region. From 1910 to 1945 it served as headquarters for the Imperial Japanese Army in Korea.

The USFK headquarters relocated to the new $11 billion Camp Humphreys in Pyeongtaek south of Seoul in 2018, as part of the Yongsan Relocation Plan. By the end of 2019, more than 20,000 U.S. troops and family members will have been relocated to the new Camp Humphreys facility south of Seoul. While most of the land will be returned to the South Korean government, the U.S. will retain a small portion of land in order to keep open the Dragon Hill Lodge military resort hotel and for a future site to relocate the U.S. Embassy in Seoul. Korean officials are still debating the future use of the land being returned, with some calling for a large park and others calling for more affordable housing.

== History ==
Yongsan Garrison's land had traditionally been the site of military facilities under former Korean kingdoms. In 1882, Qing troops used it during the Imo Incident. During that time, the area was on the outskirts of the city in mostly undeveloped land. The Imperial Japanese Army formally established the garrison and from 1910 to 1945 it served as its headquarters in Korea. Since then, the city of Seoul has spread to envelop Yongsan Garrison.

Yongsan Garrison has been used by the United States Army as Garrison Yongsan (USAG-Yongsan), under the supervision of the Installation Management Command Pacific Region.

In November 1992 some 297,000 square meters (73 acres) of land, including a golf course, was given back to the City of Seoul to become Yongsan Family Park and the site of the National Museum of Korea. The opening of the completed National Museum was delayed several years while the fate of a U.S. Army helicopter landing facility (H-208) was decided (its approach path and landing pads were directly in front of the museum).

In April 2003 South Korea and the United States agreed on the early relocation of Yongsan Garrison outside of central Seoul.

In August 2008, U.S. President George W. Bush spoke to U.S. and South Korean military personnel, their families, and civilian employees at Yongsan Garrison's Collier Field House, 6 as part of his final visit to Asia. During his speech, Bush said,"Fifty-five years have passed since the guns went quiet and the cease-fire was signed on this peninsula, and since that time our forces have kept the peace. Our nations have built a robust alliance". He also said that the U.S. would keep its military in South Korea, while returning some bases to South Korean control.

In February 2009, Secretary of State Hillary Clinton visited senior U.S. and South Korean military leaders at the Combined Forces Command headquarters at Yongsan Garrison on her first official trip overseas as the United States' Secretary of State.

In 2009 The Korea Times reported that defense ministry officials said that South Korea and the United States have agreed to complete the relocation of the U.S. military headquarters in Yongsan to an expanded military base in Pyeongtaek, Gyeonggi Province, by 2014. The plan was delayed to 2018. The 2018 estimates place the relocation completing in 2019 or 2020.

South Korea had traditionally regarded this garrison as insurance against the U.S. Army abandoning Seoul, located only about 65 km from the DMZ. As part of the relocation and the planned withdrawal of U.S. troops near the DMZ, all American troops would be pulled back from north of the Han River. A December 2014 agreement between the South Koreans and the U.S. declared that one U.S. Army brigade would be allowed to remain "north of the Han River"; it is believed this means on or near the present U.S. Army Camp Casey in Dongducheon City.

The Embassy of the United States in Seoul may build a new chancery on part of the land planned to be vacated by the U.S. Army, most probably on Camp Coiner. Most of the U.S. Embassy officials live in an embassy housing compound in an area almost completely enveloped by Yongsan Garrison, and with direct access to it.

== Facilities ==
Many of the older, dark-colored brick buildings on the base are former Japanese army buildings and are used by U.S. forces, most notably the Eighth Army headquarters building. Directly across from Eighth Army headquarters is the Combined Forces Command and U.S. Forces Korea headquarters, a structure built in the early 1970s. The building is home to the Commanding General, United Nations Command, Combined Forces Command and U.S. Forces Korea.

Facilities include multiple family housing areas, a large commissary and Post Exchange, Army Family and Morale, Welfare and Recreation facilities, restaurants, indoor and outdoor sports complexes, a library, a bowling alley, a skateboard park, a miniature golf complex, a hospital, a dental clinic, three Department of Defense Dependent Schools, a United Service Organization (USO), child development centers, indoor and outdoor swimming pools, an automotive care center, and a self-service gas station. The garrison is also home to the Dragon Hill Lodge, a hotel which is operated as an Armed Forces Recreation Center by the U.S. Army in support of personnel assigned or employed by the U.S. Forces Korea, their family members, and guests.

The garrison consists of two main parts: Main Post (North Post) and South Post, which are physically divided by Itaewon-ro, a four-lane city boulevard. In 2003, a two-lane overpass bridge was constructed over this boulevard to solve traffic congestion.

The garrison provides installation support for K-16 Air Base, Camp Kim, Sungnam Golf Course, and Camp Coiner. Camp Coiner, covering approximately 50 acres (200,000 m^{2}) on Yongsan Garrison's northern edge, is named after 2nd Lt. Randall Coiner, a Korean War Silver Star recipient. Until 2014, it also supported an outlying U.S. Army housing area called Hannam Village in Hannam-dong; that site was sold in 2016 to private developers and, as of 2018, redevelopment as luxury housing was underway. After the Korean War it served as Korea's primary in-processing facility for Army troops. (As of 2008, the 1st Replacement Company (1RC), a part of the Yongsan Readiness Center, serves as the central in-processing and orientation center for U.S. servicemembers and their families arriving to Korea.) There was an Officers' Club, NCO Club and Enlisted Club in the camp.

Collier Field House serves as the garrison's primary fitness center. Named in honor of Corporal John Collier, who was posthumously awarded the Medal of Honor for his service during the Korean War, this sports complex is on Yongsan South Post and features basketball, racquetball, volleyball, baseball, softball, aerobic, and weight training facilities. It offers authorized patrons instructor-lead fitness training programs. The Collier Field House is used for community events and town hall meetings.

The single family suburban style housing areas, with yards and tree lined streets, plus the small wooded areas throughout the Garrison stand in stark contrast to the highly urbanized areas surrounding the facility.

The War Memorial of Korea directly abuts the garrison. Before the construction of this museum, the land was part of the Korean military command and was only slightly separated from the U.S. Army facility, both having been part of the original Japanese Garrison. Outside the garrison, east of the compound is the commercial district of Itaewon, with westernized shopping and nightlife. To the west of Yongsan is the Samgakji subway station and Yongsan Electronics Market. Although access to the garrison is controlled at the gates, it was possible for larger-than-normal drops of North Korean propaganda (leaflets and CDs) to occur at Yongsan Garrison, as recently as 22 December 2017. US troops were cautioned not to handle the materials themselves but to report them to Eighth Army G2X (counterintelligence).

=== Administration ===
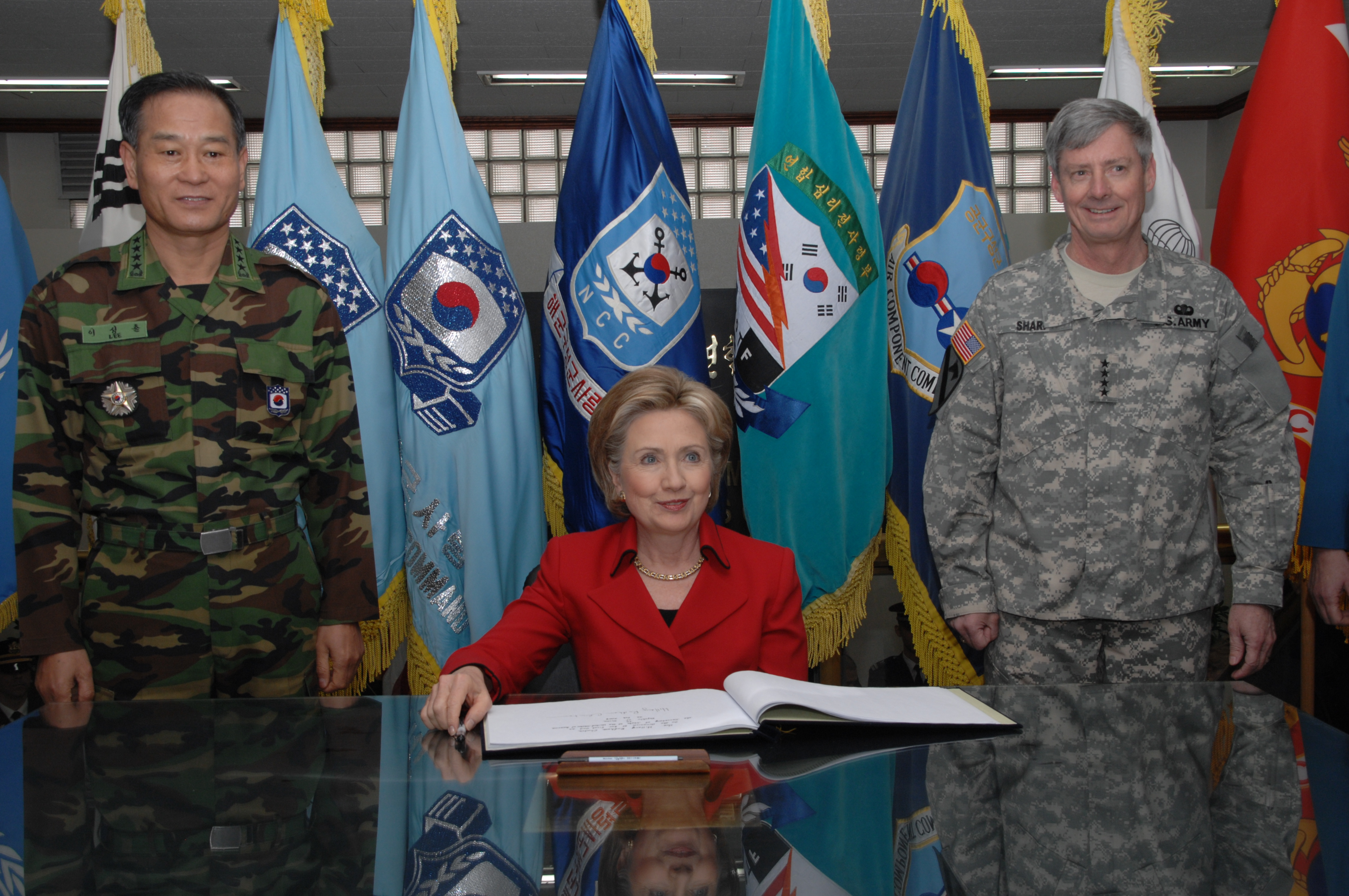
Secretary of State Hillary Clinton visits USAG-Yongsan 20 February 2009. The Combined Forces Command (CFC) Commanding General Walter Sharp (right) and his deputy, General Lee Sung-chool (이성출, left), welcomed the secretary.

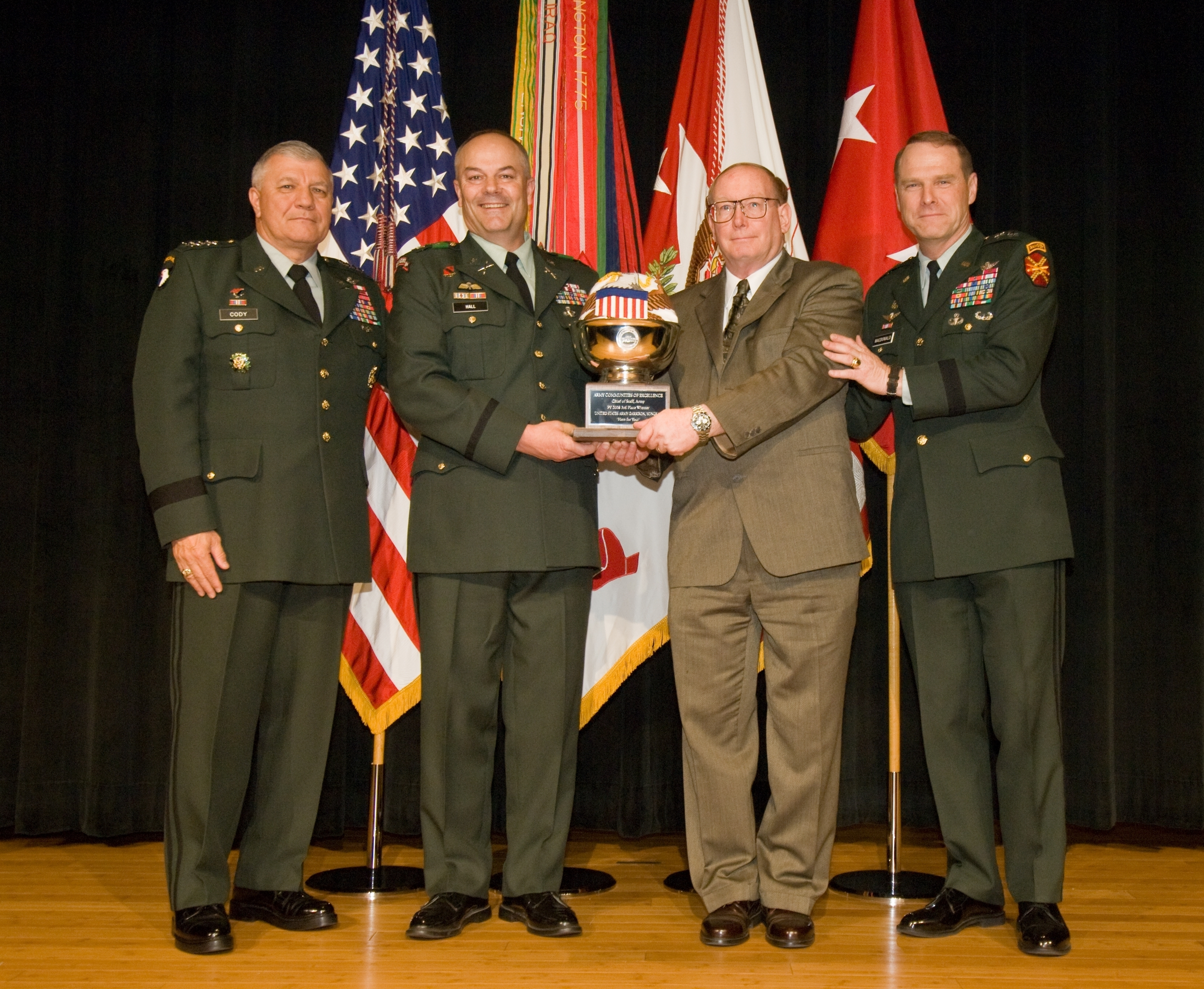
Army Vice Chief of Staff Gen. Richard A. Cody (left) and Installation Management Command Deputy Commander Maj. Gen. John A. Macdonald (right) present USAG-Yongsan officials with a third-place trophy for the Fiscal 2008 Army Communities of Excellence competition 8 May at the Pentagon.

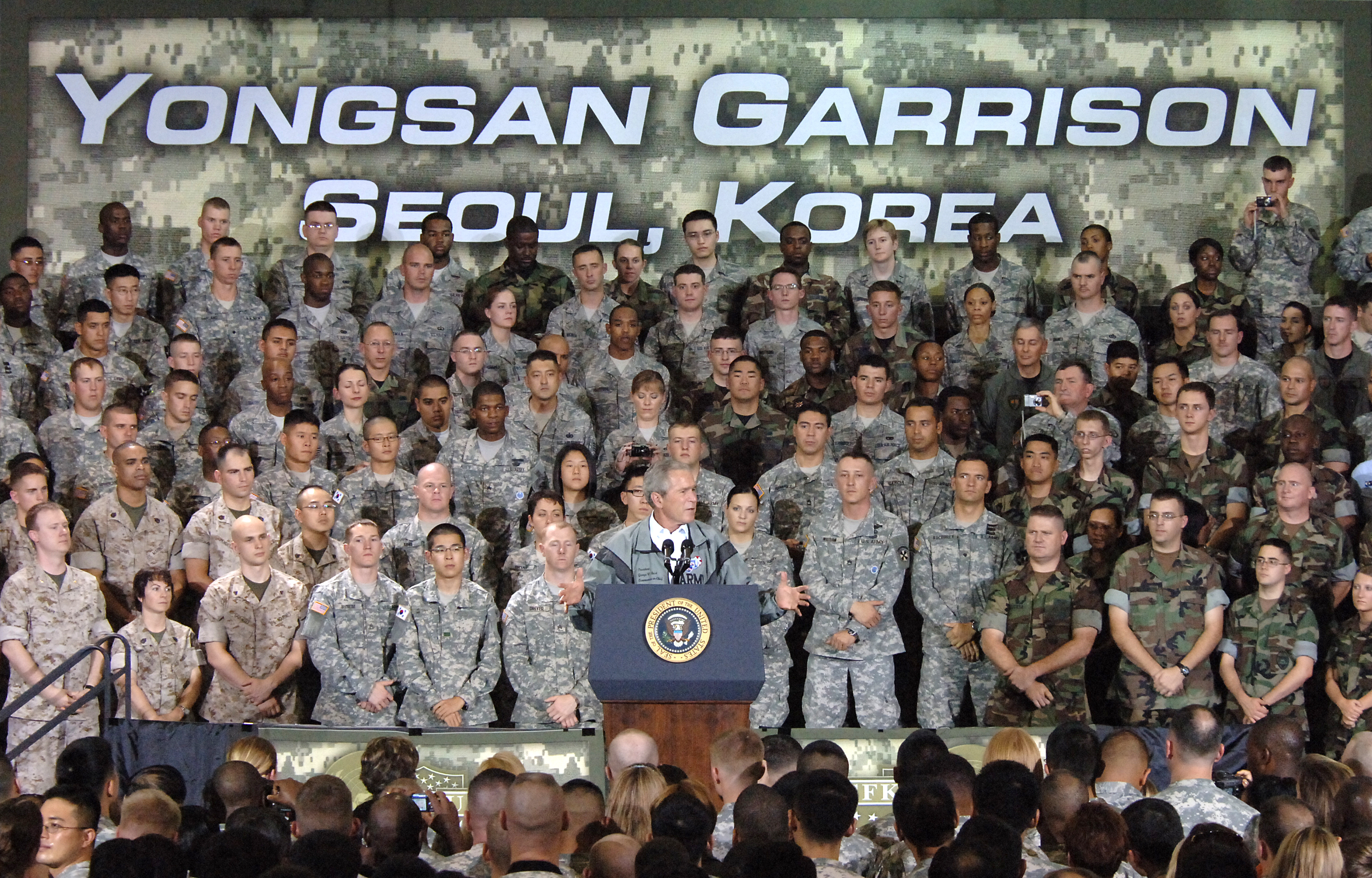
President George W. Bush spoke to military personnel, their families and civilian employees at Collier Field House while visiting U.S. Army Garrison Yongsan, 6 August 2008.

Yongsan Garrison is commanded by a U.S. Army colonel and is one of four U.S. Army Installation Management Command Pacific Region(IMCOM-P) garrisons in the Republic of Korea, and one of 179 such garrisons worldwide.

IMCOM-P is a military organization primarily to provide the United States Army in Korea the installation capabilities and services to support operations, and to provide a quality of life for soldiers and their families. IMCOM-P is the Korean regional office of the Installation Management Command headquartered in Hawaii.

=== Army Family Covenant ===
In December 2007 Yongsan Garrison officials and the IMCOM-Korean commanding general pledged their support to develop and improve family programs during an Army Family Covenant signing ceremony. According to garrison officials, "The Army Family Covenant is our commitment to deliver a quality of life commensurate to our Soldiers' service." During the ceremony, the Yongsan Garrison commander cited recent improvements to family programs at the USAG-Yongsan, such as elimination of initial registration fees for child care, extended hours for respite care and extended-duty child care, and expanded programs for teens and after-school care, including youth sports. The Army committed $1.4 billion to family programs in fiscal 2008.

=== Army Family Housing ===
The garrison's primary housing areas include Loring Village, Lloyd L. Burke Towers, Watkins Ridge and Krzyzowski Hills. Commonly known as Black Hawk Housing Area, Loring Village consists of 16 housing structures, each containing multiple housing units, and was named after U.S. Air Force Major Charles Loring, who was posthumously awarded the Medal of Honor for his service during the Korean War. In 2004, South Korean-funded construction of the Lloyd L. Burke Towers (commonly known as Burke Towers) was completed. Consisting of two five-story towers, the housing area includes three-, four- and five bedroom units, as well as outdoor barbecue areas, a basketball court and underground parking facility. The towers were named after Army 1st Lt. Lloyd L. Burke, who was awarded the Medal of Honor for his service during the Korean War. Watkins Ridge housing area consists of 23 housing structures, each containing multiple housing units, and was named after Army Master Sergeant Travis Watkins, who was posthumously awarded the Medal of Honor for his service during the Korean War. Krzyzowski Hills housing area consists of 10 housing structures, with multiple housing units each and named after Army Captain Edward Krzyzowski, who was posthumously awarded the Medal of Honor for his service during the Korean War. Unaccompanied military personnel are assigned to Unaccompanied Personnel Housing on-post such as barracks, Bachelor Enlisted Quarters (BEQ), Senior Enlisted Quarters (SEQ), or Bachelor Officer Quarters (BOQ). When on-post housing is not available, unaccompanied military personnel are assigned to off-post quarters.

=== Army Community of Excellence ===
In 2008, Army Vice Chief of Staff Gen. Richard A. Cody recognized Yongsan Garrison as one of the top three U.S. Army Installations in the World and recognized the garrison by declaring it an Army Community of Excellence. The ACOE competition recognizes excellence in installation management and encourages and rewards installations that optimize opportunities and demonstrate a commitment to service and excellence. Of 179 Army installations, Yongsan placed third behind second-place Fort George G. Meade, Md., and first-place finisher Fort A.P. Hill, Va.

=== Brian Allgood Army Community Hospital ===
Yongsan Garrison was home to the Brian Allgood Army Community Hospital (BAACH). The main tenant unit residing in BAACH was the 121st Combat Support Hospital, providing the staff for inpatient and outpatient care. The staff included a mix of active duty soldiers, civilians employees, and Korean employees. It was originally activated in 1944 as the 121st Evacuation Hospital, Semimobile. It participated in the European Theater during World War II and in the Korean War. It has served continuously in Korea as a field unit since 25 September 1950 and as fixed medical treatment facility, Seoul Military Hospital, since 1959. In 1971, Seoul Military Hospital merged with the 121st Evacuation Hospital to become the U.S. Army Hospital, Seoul (121st Evacuation Hospital). On 16 April 1994, the 121st Evacuation Hospital reorganized and was redesignated the 121st General Hospital. On 30 June 2008 the facility was formally renamed the Brian D. Allgood Army Community Hospital. Colonel Allgood served as the commander at this hospital from June 2004 through June 2006. Allgood's final assignment was July 2006 when he was posted as the Command Surgeon Multi-National Forces-Iraq (MNF-I). On 20 January 2007, he, along with 11 other U.S. service members, were killed in action when their UH-60 helicopter was shot down by enemy rocket fire in Iraq. In September 2019, BAACH completed its relocation from Yongsan to Camp Humphreys.

=== Department of Defense Dependent Schools ===
Seoul American High School (SAHS) is on Yongsan Garrison. The school complex comprises eight buildings, containing over 60 classrooms and special purpose rooms. The school has two combination faculty lounges and work areas. A library/media center houses 12,000 books and audio visual materials. The educator staff of 70 is composed of the Department of Defense Dependent Schools education specialists and classroom teachers. SAHS opened in 1959 with approximately 150 students. The first class graduated in 1960. The classrooms at that time were Quonset huts located across from the main Army Community Service building. Taegu, Pusan, and Chinhae students boarded at SAHS as there were no high schools in those areas until 1967. In the fall of 1967, Taegu opened its high school, which alleviated the long drive for students. Construction began on the new high school in 1981 and was completed in the fall of 1982. In addition to the main, arts, and gymnasium buildings a new structure which includes a JROTC section was opened in 1987. The JROTC facilities have two classrooms, three offices, supply room, arms room, four-point indoor rifle range, and a hard top area used for inspections and drills. Additionally, JROTC formal inspections are held on the Falcon Fields, the school's full-sized artificial turf football and soccer field. School year, 1995–96 Seoul American High School had 550 students. This year enrollment is 630. SAHS is one of the larger schools in DoDDS Pacific and has a reputation for being one of the leading academic schools. Every year SAHS ranks in the top 15% of high schools academics. Over the summer of 2009, SAHS Football/soccer field recently had "stadium lights" placed along the side of the fields, which can be easily seen when driving by the field, fulfilling their part in the "American Dream". The tennis court was also taken out and replaced with a new building due to an influx of students from the states.

Seoul American Middle School (SAMS) and Seoul American Elementary School (SAES) are on Yongsan Garrison. In 2008, to accommodate an increase in student population, a 7,900-square-foot (730 m^{2}) classroom building was constructed on the SAMS campus. The new building's six classrooms – each 900 square feet (84 m^{2}) – accommodate up to about 170 Department of Defense Dependent Schools students. The SAES campus consists of seven buildings and a cafeteria. The main building houses primary classrooms, the Information Center, the Dolphin Theater, and computer labs. Grades 3, 4 and 5 and some Kindergarten classrooms are located in outlying buildings. SAES is one of the largest schools in DoDDS and ranked as one of the highest in academic performance. There are about 1,100 students at Seoul American Elementary School. The staff consists of over 90 professional educators, 20 educational aides and 10 clerical personnel. The school's curriculum is based on the U.S. national standards with special classes including art, music, physical education, computer and Korean culture.

== Soil and water contamination ==
As early as 2001, an oil leak at the Garrison was reported and known to have caused petroleum contamination of the local underground water reserves near Yongsan. Despite the USFK declaration that the leak had been addressed and contaminated soil had been removed and rectified by 2006, levels of petroleum detected in the waters around the garrison continued to increase over time and by 2016, petroleum levels were well beyond what the Korean government considered safe for household use. When environmental assessments were conducted as part of the effort to close down the US operations at the base and return the land to South Korean control, additional benzene, toluene, and xylene–chemicals associated with petroleum and aviation fuel processes–contamination was detected in the soil. As of 2026, several zones around the Yongsan Garrison lands were still under active cleanup and restoration efforts were still ongoing.

== Camp Kim ==
Camp Kim is adjacent to Yongsan Garrison and home to a USO facility, an Army and Air Force Exchange Service (AAFES) distribution and storage facility, an AAFES vehicle repair facility, the Special Operations Command Korea, and the garrison office for vehicle registration and decals.

The USO facility consists of a canteen, tour and ticket office, the Virtues Development Program, the Good Neighbor Program, a big screen television lounge. The Virtues Development Program and the Good Neighbor Program are Community Outreach Programs designed to promote cross-cultural understanding through English education for Korean school-age children.

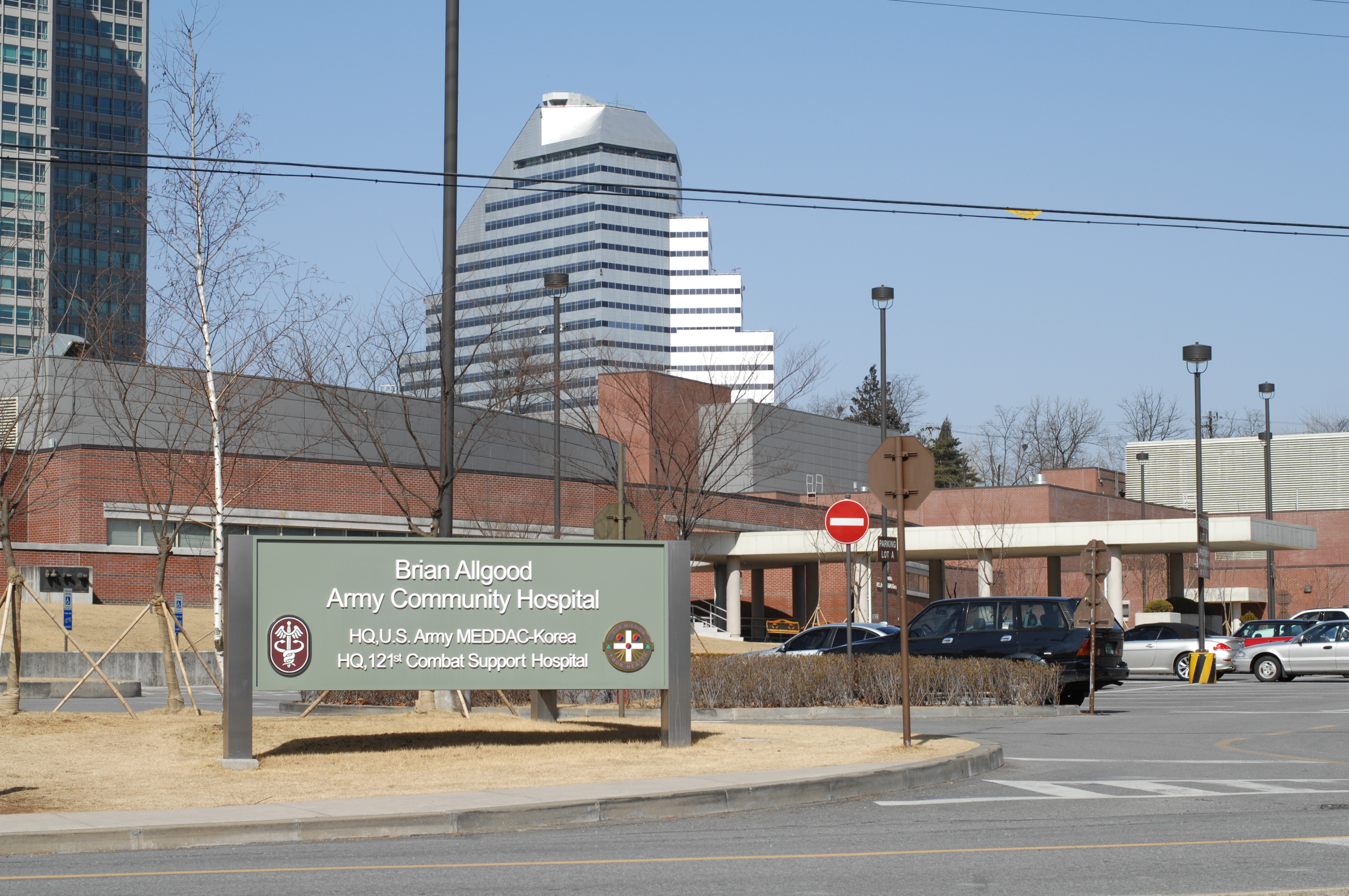
Brian Allgood Army Community Hospital, Yongsan Garrison, March 2009

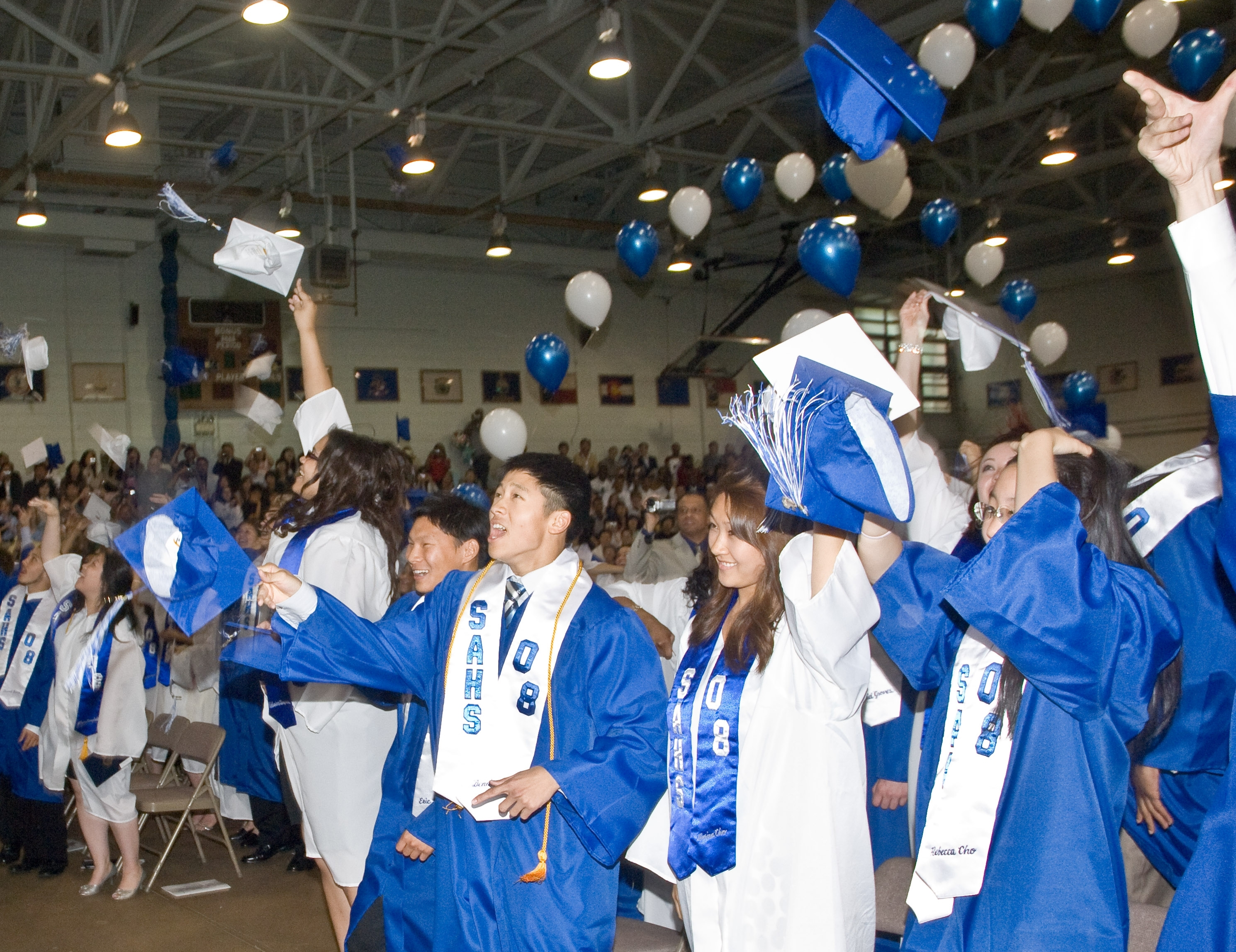
Seoul American High School Graduation Ceremony, Yongsan Garrison, June 2008

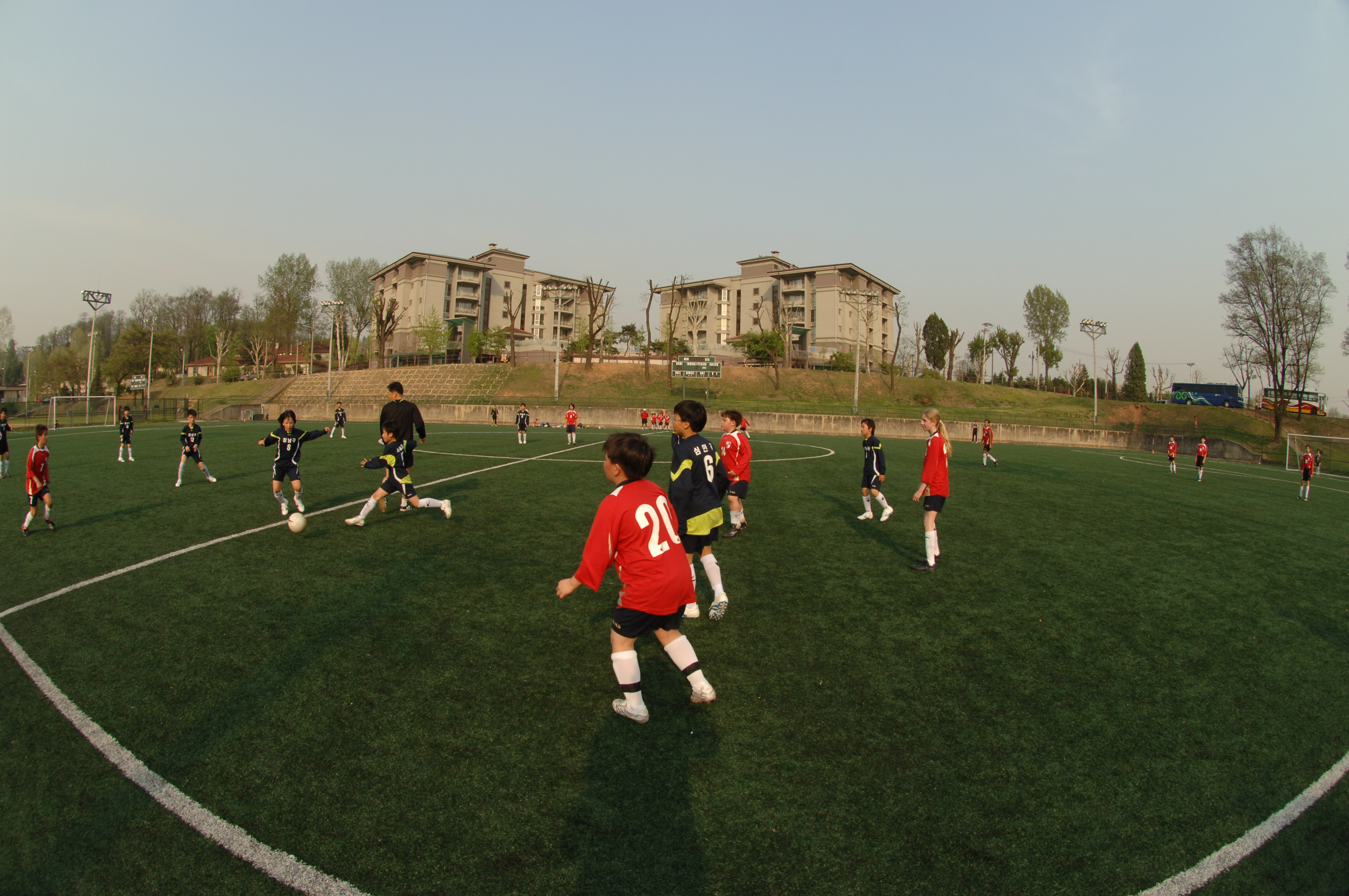
8th Army Good Neighbor Program youth soccer team, Yongsan Garrison. Lloyd L. Burke Towers housing area seen in the background, April 2008

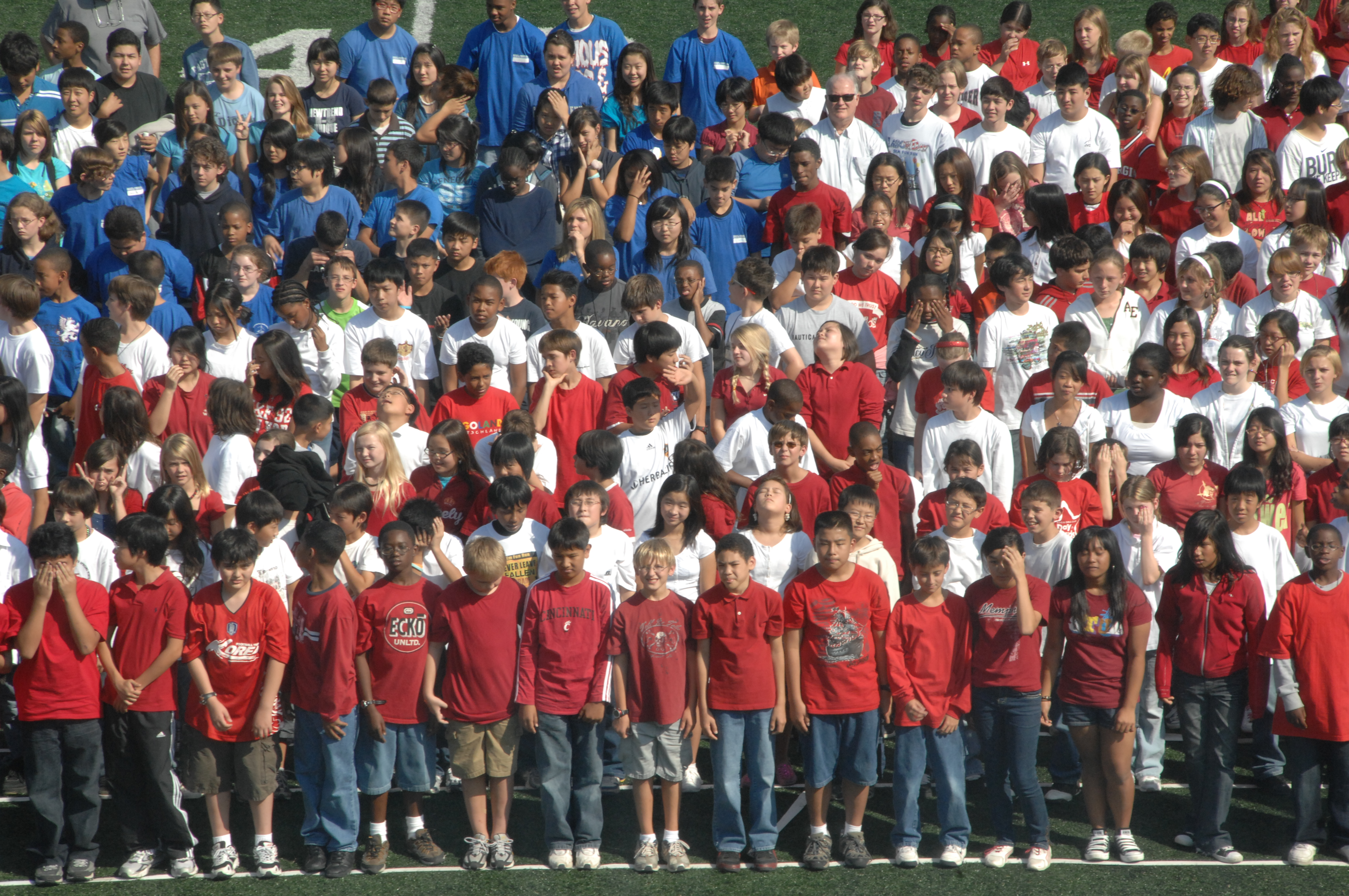
Seoul American Middle School class picture, Yongsan Garrison. 1 October 2008.

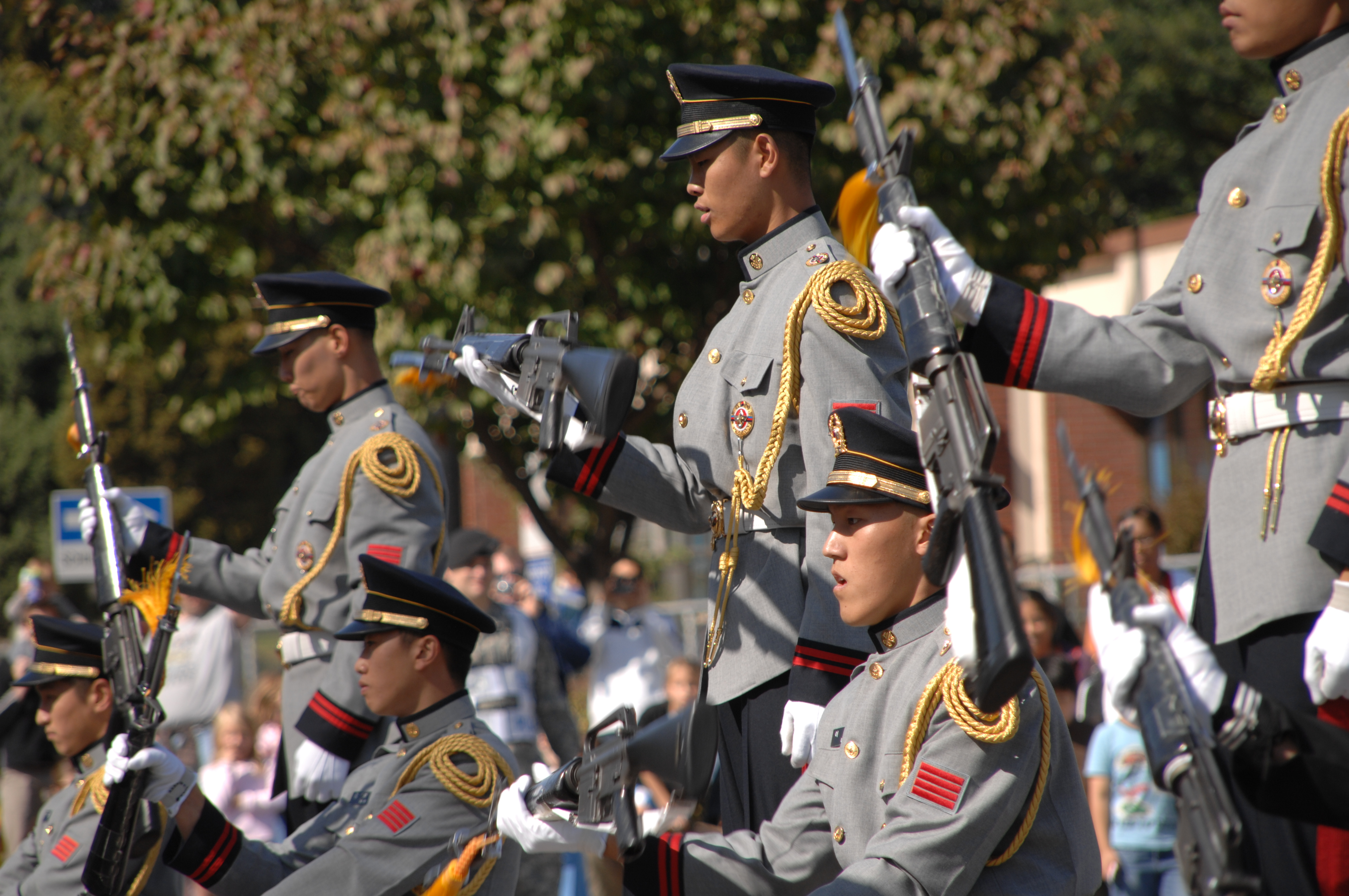
A South Korean military drill team performs during the Fall Festival Parade, Yongsan Garrison on 11 October 2008.

== Legacy ==
As countless USFK personnel as well as Korean civilians have lived and worked on post, Yongsan Garrison has had far-reaching influence on Korea's society and development. Historians have been rushing to archive Yongsan's history, tracing its influence in areas including music, art, cuisine, medicine, engineering and so on, for the Yongsan Legacy project so it won't be forgotten after physical traces have disappeared.

== See also ==
- McFarland incident, a toxic waste dumping that occurred at the site in 2000
- Red Hill water crisis, a groundwater contamination event caused by a leak at a United States Navy fuel storage facility.
- 2nd Infantry Division (United States)
- Anti-American sentiment in Korea
- Department of Defense Dependents Schools
- Eighth United States Army
- Army and Air Force Exchange Service
