= All That Jazz =

The phrase and all that jazz means "and other such things", "and all that sort of thing". It is recorded in print in this sense as early as 1959, and was associated with the city of Chicago in Frank Sinatra's 1964 rendition of "My Kind of Town", where the lyric "Chicago is my kind of razzmatazz, and it has all that jazz" is sung.

As a title, All That Jazz most frequently refers to:

- "All That Jazz" (song), from the 1975 stage musical Chicago
- All That Jazz (film), 1979 musical drama by Bob Fosse

It may also refer to:

== In music ==
- "All That Jazz" (Mel Tormé song), recorded for the 1966 film A Man Called Adam, and subsequently released on the 1997 reissue of Right Now!
- All That Jazz (Breathe album), released 1988
- All That Jazz (Ella Fitzgerald album), released 1989
- All That Jazz: The Best of Ute Lemper, released 1998
- "All That Jazz", song by Echo & the Bunnymen from Crocodiles (1980)
- "All That Jazz", song by DJ Fresh from Escape from Planet Monday (2006)
- All That Jazz (Swedish band), rock band formed in Karlstad in 1983
- All That Jazz (Japanese band), band commissioned by Studio Ghibli in the 2000s to make jazz covers of their soundtracks

== In TV and radio ==
- "All That Jazz", 1961 episode of Top Cat
- "All That Jazz" (The Golden Girls), 1989 episode
- "All That Jazz" (radio series), 1990 sitcom featuring Wendy van der Plank
- "All That Jazz" (Sealab 2021), 2001 episode
- I Am Jazz, reality series with working title All That Jazz, first broadcast in 2015

== Other ==
- All That Jazz (jazz club), a jazz club in Seoul, South Korea

== See also ==
- Love and All That Jazz
