= Haebangchon =

Neighborhood of Seoul, South Korea

- district
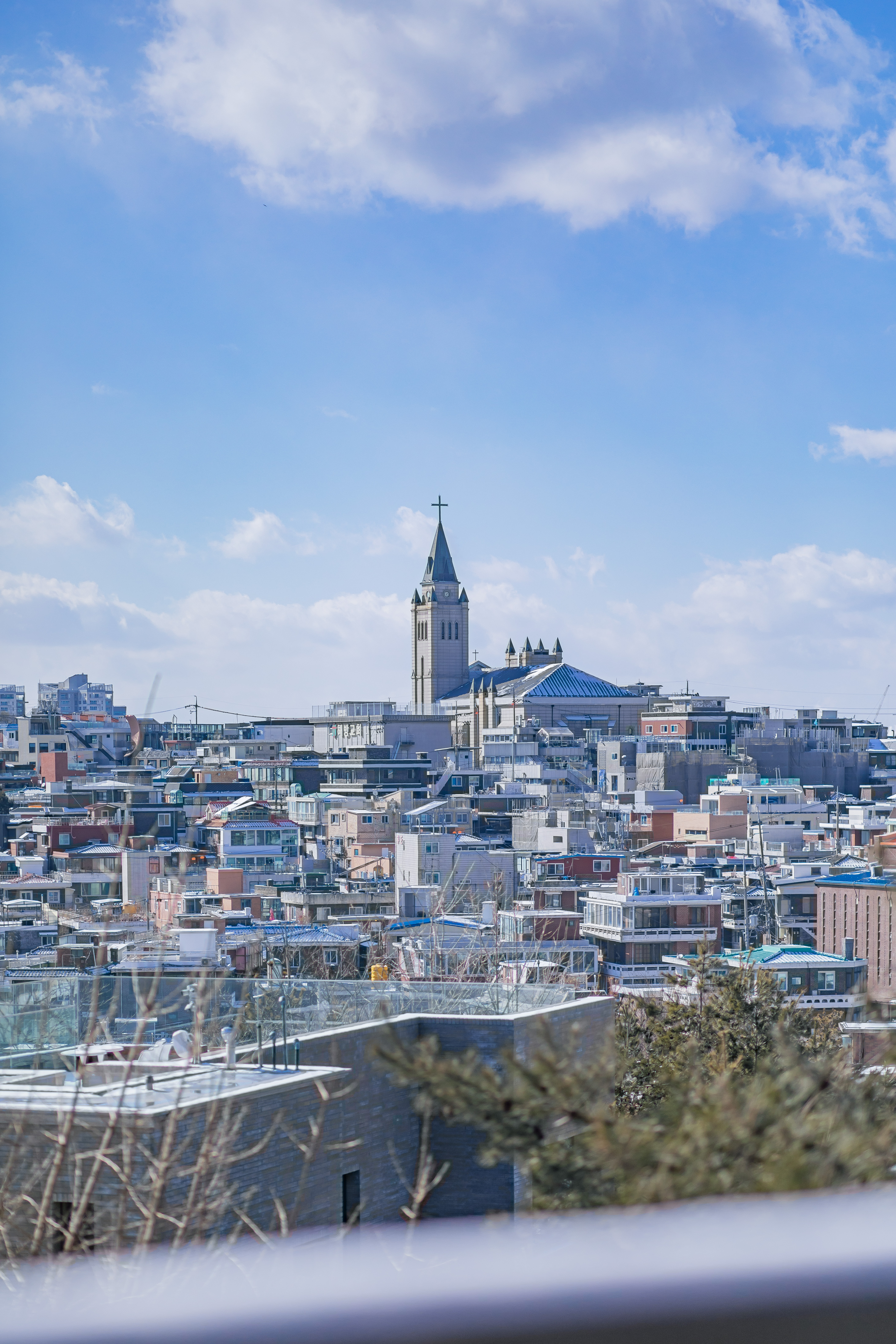
- Haebangchon in 2025

- Location within South Korea
- Coordinates: 37.5737°N 126.9627°E
- Country: South Korea

Seoul Future Heritage
- Reference no.: 2013-283

Korean name
- Hangul: 해방촌
- Hanja: 解放村
- RR: Haebangchon
- MR: Haebangch'on

Haebangchon (HBC; Korean: 해방촌; lit. 'Freedom Village') is a district of Yongsan District, Seoul, South Korea. It is one of the oldest neighborhoods in central Seoul. It is also known as the neighborhood at the foot of Namsan (남산자락). The neighborhood's close proximity to Itaewon and the Yongsan Garrison US Army facility has made the area popular with expatriates and military staff. In recent years, the area has become a haven for people from a variety of English-speaking nations. The neighborhood is home to Korean residents, as well as Americans, Canadians, Filipinos, Australians, New Zealanders, South Africans, Britons, Nigerians, Russians and Ecuadorians who have found their home in the "Freedom Village". Many businesses in HBC are foreign-owned and offer a distinct flavor not found elsewhere in Seoul.

Recently, Haebangchon has become the 'new' area in Yongsan to open or establish a new business. It became one of the hot places in Seoul juxtaposed with Itaewon and Gyeonglidan-gil (right across the street from Haebangchon). On the old alleyways up to Namsan, cafes, restaurants, pubs, studios, and bakeries are taking up. It is known for its unique atmosphere of co-existence of past and present, Korean and foreign. The HBC Music festival has been a main component in drawing people and new business to the Haebangchon area.

== History ==
Haebangchon was originally the site of a shooting field used by the 20th division of the Japanese military. A government office of the U.S. army took over the area after liberation in 1945. However, its control was limited and the area was settled by refugees from the North and returning citizens (귀환동포). It was the origin of the shanty town (판자촌) and became a magnet for those who returned after liberation but had lost their hometowns.

== Geography ==
Haebangchon is a small village in Yongsan District, in the center of Seoul, South Korea. It is accessible by public transport: it is close to Noksapyung Station of Line 6 of Seoul Metro. Most of the Yongsan-2-ga postal area and a part of Yongsan-1-ga are included. It is overlooked by the mountain Namsan and is south of the Namsan Tower.

== Culture ==
Haebangchon is a multi-cultural neighborhood in Seoul, aligned with Itaewon and Gyeongnidan-gil. According to 2013 statistics, 1,065 out of 12,648 residents of Yongsan-2-ga are foreign. This can also be seen in and around the Sinheung-Ro area. Studios, art spaces, and food outlet from many cuisines line the main roads, and a few newer shops have appeared in smaller and more residential side streets. There is a convergence between residence and commercial space in HBC; however, the buildings have always had the first floor as either parking or a business space for many years in HBC. In 2018 Minerva Schools at KGI opened a campus in Haebangchon bringing with it around 200 international students to live in the area from September to December.

== Attractions ==
=== Art Village ===
Recently Yongsan District Office and the neighbors finished the Art Village Project. As a result, the old alleys are decorated with murals and artworks.

=== 108 Stairway ===
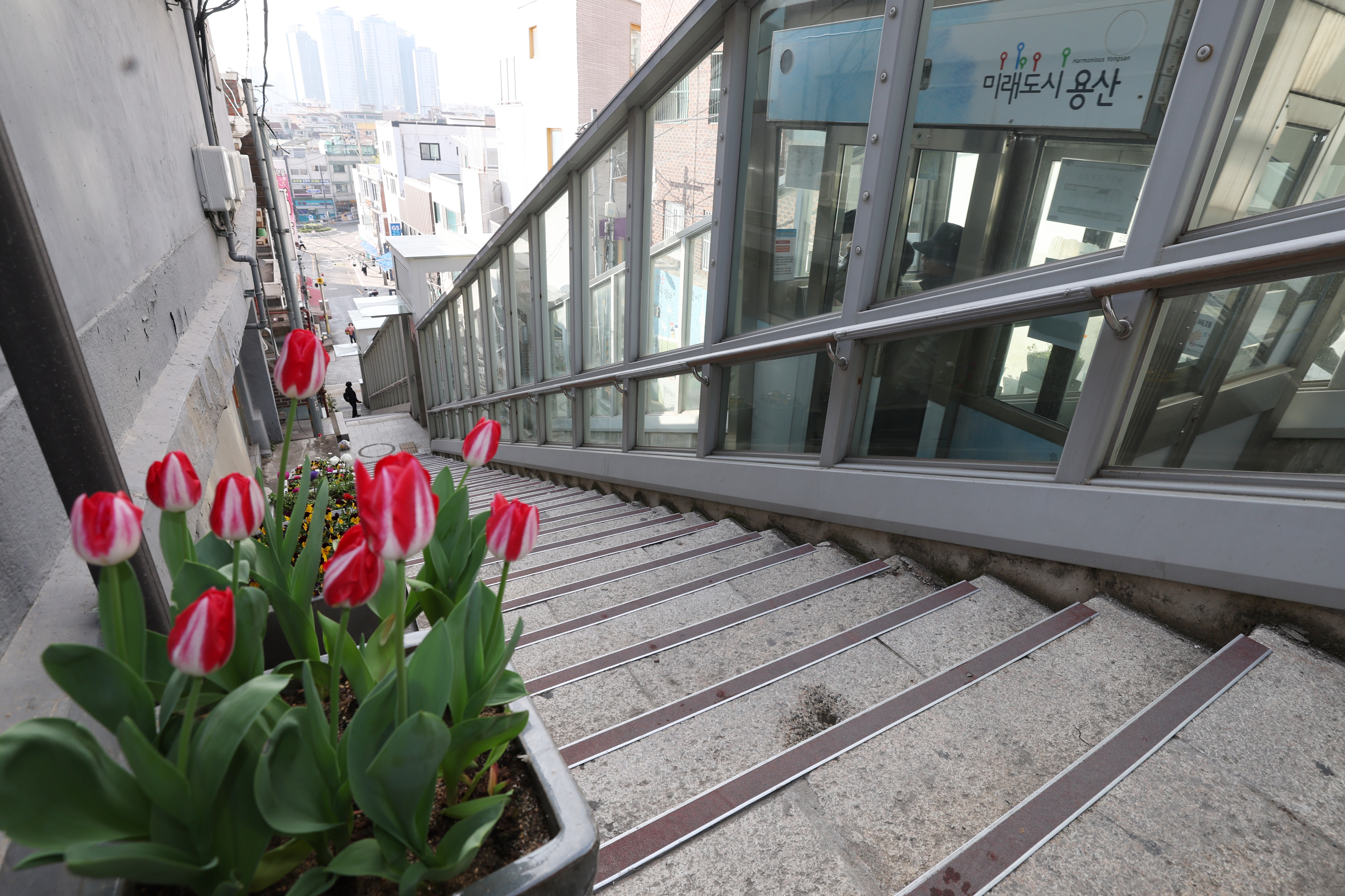
108 Heaven Stairway

There is a steep hill with 108 stairs, called 108 Heaven stairway (108 하늘계단). It was built during the Japanese Colonial era to allow easy access to the shrine. After independence from Japan, the shrine was demolished but the stairway remained. The stairway was used as a location in the TV series Something Happened in Bali.

=== Haebangchon Five-way Intersection ===
This intersection is located at the top of Haebangchon and connects to Sowol-ro, the road that skirts Namsan Mountain. Nearby is Sinheung Market (신흥시장). This market flourished in the 1970s and 80s, but declined thereafter until a revitalization program that began in 2018.

=== Sinheung Market ===
Beginning in 2018, the Seoul Government began to renovate Sinheung Market. In 2022, the aging roof covering the market walkways was removed and replaced with a less restrictive canopy that lets in fresh air and more sun. Additional construction on the walkways was done in 2023 and 2024. Sinheung Market is now a trendy destination for Koreans in their late 20s and 30s, containing foreign restaurants, select shops, cafes, and more.

=== Hae Bang Chon Music Festival ===
The premiere independent music festival in Seoul, Korea, Hae Bang Chon (HBC) music festival has been running in the Yongsan area since 2006. It was founded by Lance Reegan-Diehl and DEELEEBOB music along with James Gaynor. Musical attractions and people from all parts of Korea and the world assemble for live music performed by both professional and amateur artists, including open mic sessions. The HBC Festival took place twice a year: the May Music Festival and the Fall Music Festival. The last fest was the 15th year anniversary 2022, it has not continued.
