= 10 won bread =

South Korean street food

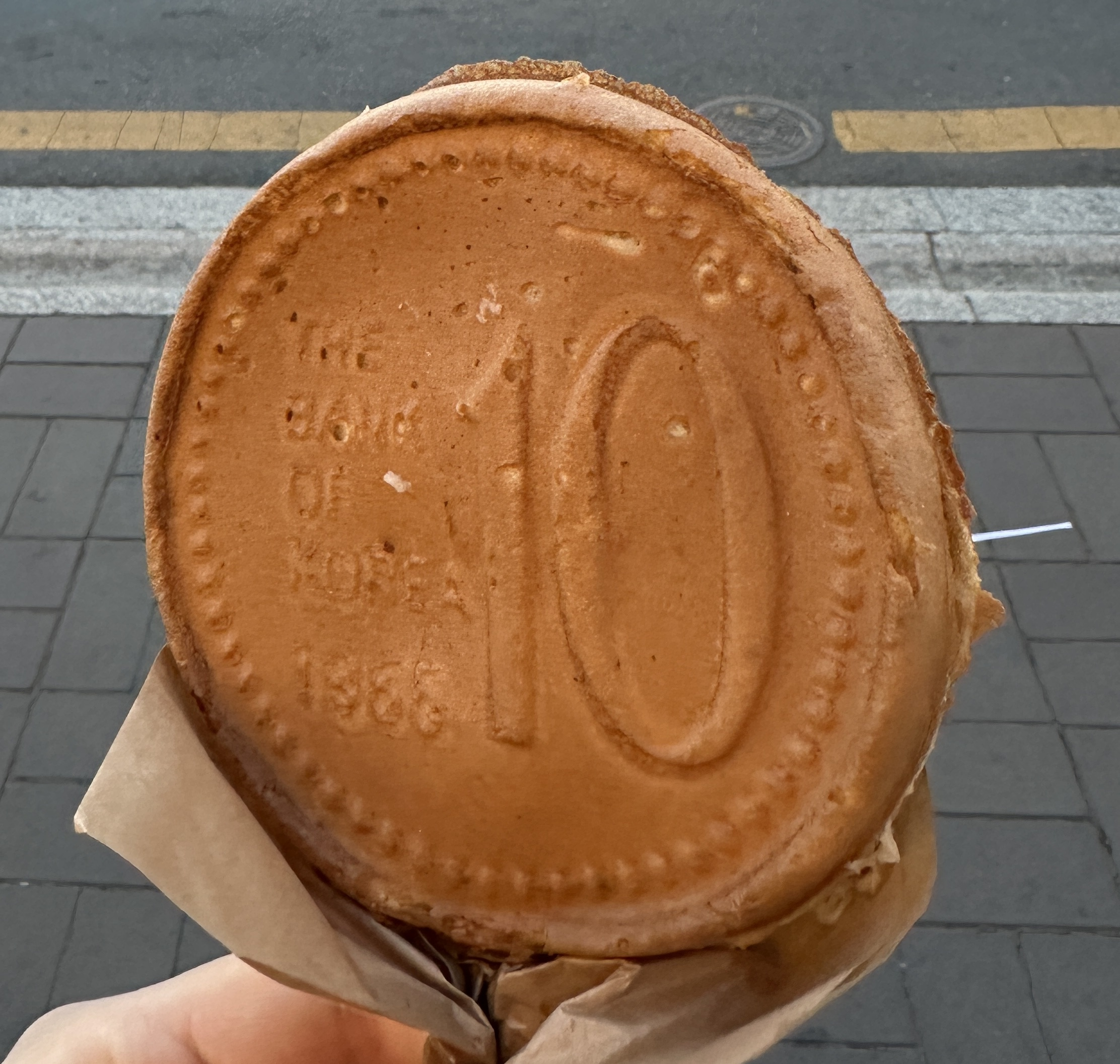
10 won bread

10 won bread (Korean: 십원빵), also sometimes called 10 won waffle or sibwonppang, is a South Korean street food that was first sold in Gyeongju in 2019. It is a bread or waffle in the shape of a South Korean 10 won coin that contains stretchy mozzarella cheese.

The bread has inspired a number of variations in various cities across South Korea, including 50 won bread (in Jeonju), 100 won bread (in Tongyeong), and 500 won bread (in Seoul's Sinsa-dong). In 2022, it spread to Japan as 10 yen bread.

== Description ==
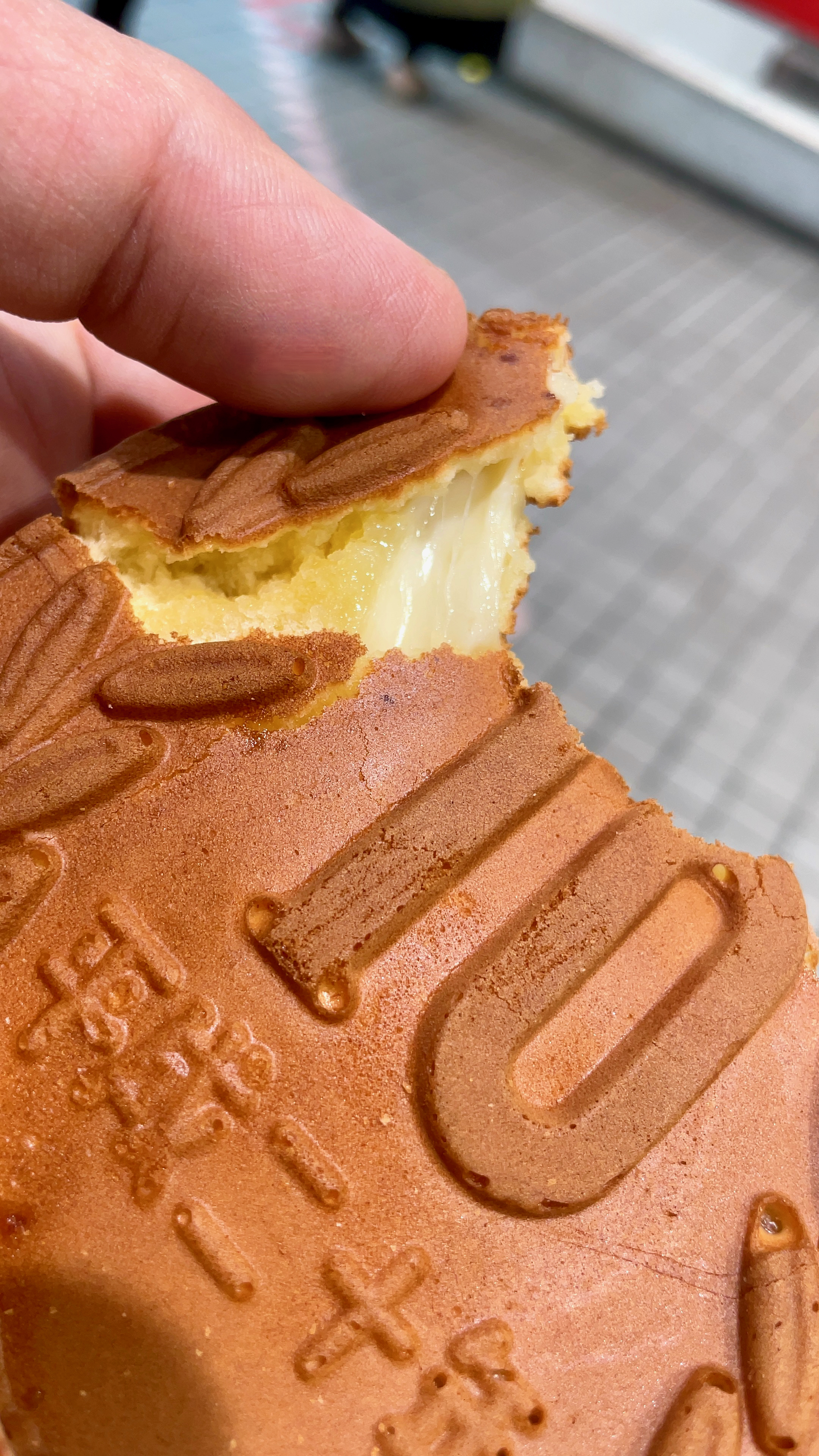
A 10 yen bread being torn to show the cheese filling

The bread has markings that make it closely resemble a 10 won coin. This coin was selected because the coin's reverse side shows an image of the Dabotap pagoda in Gyeongju's famous temple Bulguksa.

The dish was reportedly invented by a Jeju Province-based company (제주한치빵). It began making a similar cheese-filled bread dish called Hanchi bread in 2016, which was shaped like a squid. The company decided to make variations on the dish that appealed to the local character of various places around South Korea, and chose the 10 won coin for Gyeongju. It signed a franchising agreement with a Gyeongju-based distributor, who began selling the dish in December 2019 at Gyeongju's Hwangnidan-gil shopping street. However, the seller reportedly violated the terms of the contract by using cheese that was not from Jeju Province, which resulted in a civil court case and a fine. The agreement was terminated in 2021. Despite this, the seller filed a trademark for the bread under a slightly different brand name and continued operating. Concurrently, numerous copycat sellers emerged in the city. A court ruling then prohibited the seller from using the name "10 won bread"; the company circumvented this by using the name "Gyeongju 10 won bread".

Around 2022 and 2023, the South Korean Bank of Korea asked the makers of 10 won bread to change the design of the bread in order to abide by laws that prevent the for-profit use of the coin's design. Many shop owners were reportedly reluctant to abide by the request. They argued that the South Korean government had published the coin's design files under the Korea Open Government License, which allows for commercial use. The Bank of Korea reported that the license's use had been a mistake. A number of merchants interviewed were not very concerned by the Bank of Korea's actions. In August 2024, it was reported that the Bank of Korea would adjust its regulations to allow the commercial use of its currency designs in some scenarios, including for the design of the bread.

In September 2021, South Korean president Yoon Suk Yeol ate the bread while on the campaign trail. In 2024, it was reported that a store in Hong Kong sold the bread as "10 cent bread".
