= Itaewon =

Commercial district in Seoul, South Korea

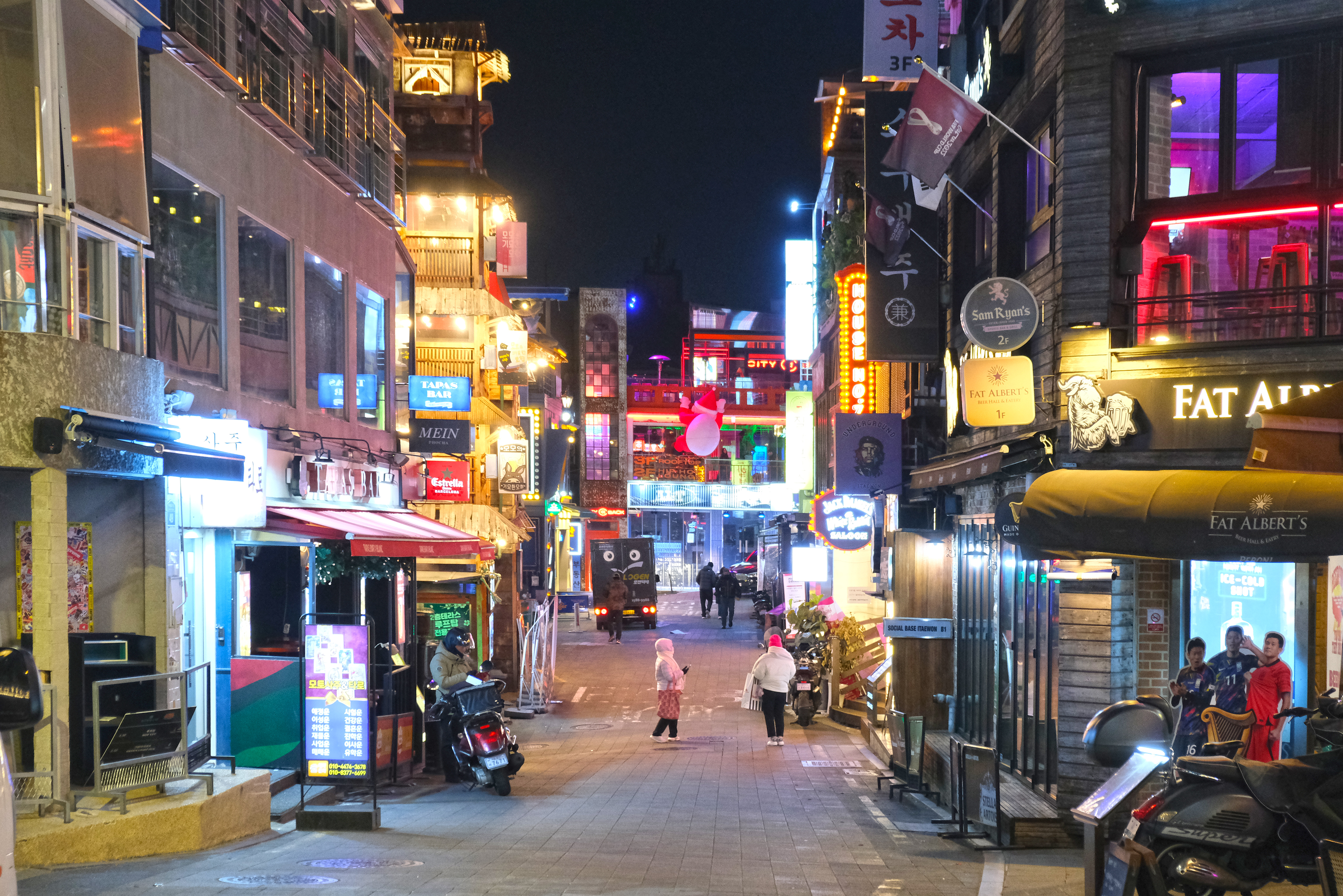
- Itaewon food street, December 2022

- Location within Seoul
- Coordinates: 37°32′N 126°59′E
- Country: South Korea
- City: Seoul
- District: Yongsan District
- Neighborhood: Itaewon-dong

Korean name
- Hangul: 이태원
- Hanja: 梨泰院
- RR: Itaewon
- MR: It'aewŏn

Itaewon (Korean: 이태원; Korean pronunciation: [itʰɛwʌn]) is a commercial area within the Itaewon-dong neighborhood of Yongsan District in Seoul, South Korea, known for its nightlife and multi-ethnic population.

== Etymology ==
"Itaewon" is derived from the name of an inn located there during the Joseon period. Today, the name alludes to the area's abundance of pear trees (梨泰院). According to a folktale, Itaewon was written using different Hanja characters that hinted at foreign babies (異胎院). When the Japanese invaded Seoul (1592–1593) during the Imjin War, a group of Japanese soldiers seized a Buddhist temple in what is now Itaewon, where Buddhist nuns lived. They proceeded to rape them and subsequently burned the temple. The homeless nuns settled nearby and eventually gave birth. People from neighboring villages named the area where the children were raised Itaewon in a portmanteau of terms meaning "different", "foreign", and "fetus". During the war, this was also where wounded and surrendered Japanese soldiers (이타인/異他人) were allowed to live.

== History ==
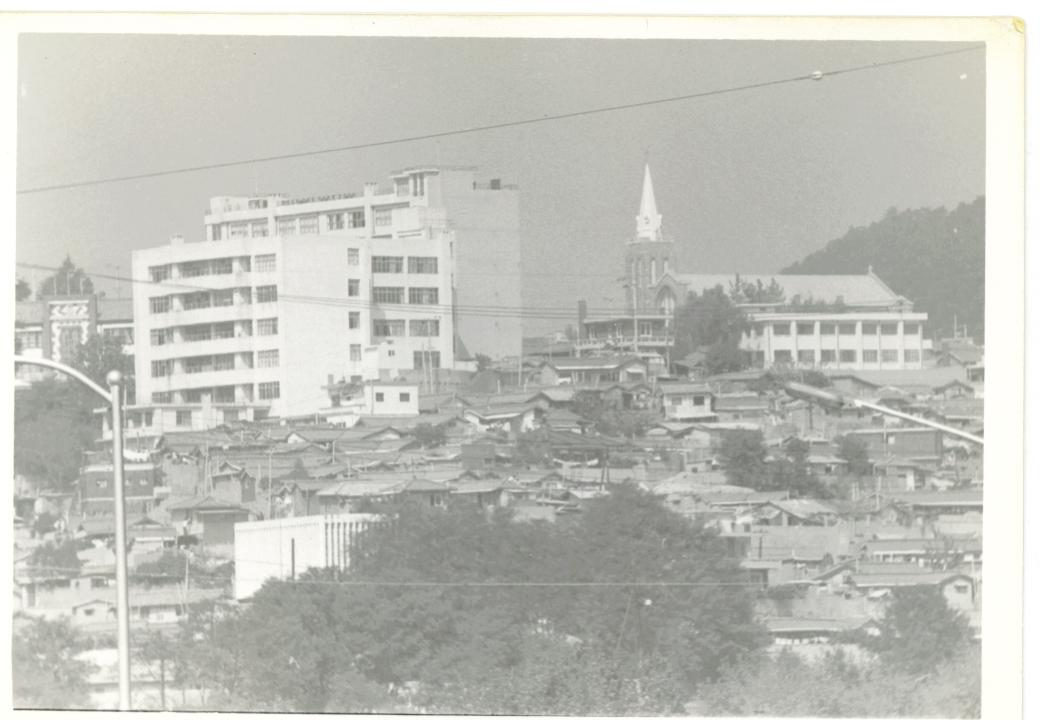
Itaewon, 1978–1979

Itaewon was originally a transportation hub where travelers could obtain horses, during the Goryeo period (918–1392). During the Joseon period (1392–1910), Itaewon became more significant, as the new leaders relocated the country's capital to Hanyang—modern-day Seoul. As foreigners entered Korea in the 1880s, embassies and inns began to pop up in the region. Apart from Incheon, Itaewon became one of the most prominent spots for foreigners and travelers heading in and out of the capital city. Itaewon housed the city's largest cemetery until 1937.

More recent history of Itaewon as a neighborhood of Seoul's Yongsan District is closely linked to the American Yongsan Garrison, established in 1945. With its large number of bars and brothels, the area has been thought of as a dangerous place by many South Koreans, with local incidents sometimes blowing up into national or geopolitical crises.Since U.S. soldiers were given pleasure leave from 1957, brothels sprang up in Itaewon. Minors and women were kidnapped and forced into prostitution well into the 1980s in camp villages that operated under U.S. jurisdiction, and the South Korean government designated some of the locations as official "comfort facilities" for soldiers. Under this system, there was an absence of full legal accountability in the face of frequent abuses committed by American GIs. Criminal liability was limited in many cases where GIs would attack or abuse women living in the camp villages. The status of forces agreement between the U.S. and South Korean governments stipulated that all crimes committed by U.S. military personnel fell exclusively under the jurisdiction of U.S. military courts. A National Assembly report from that time compiled a list of 39,542 crimes committed by U.S. military personnel between 1967 and 1987, including murders, rapes, theft, arson, and smuggling, which went largely unpunished.

Twenty years after the Korean War (1950–53), Itaewon became a shopping district. It gradually gentrified and, in 2013, the U.S. military moved its base, with 17,000 soldiers, to southern Seoul. Itaewon also became something of a home for the LGBT movement and was considered to be as open to foreigners as it was to Koreans. However, even as the area modernized, its characteristic narrow streets remained.

== Local attractions ==
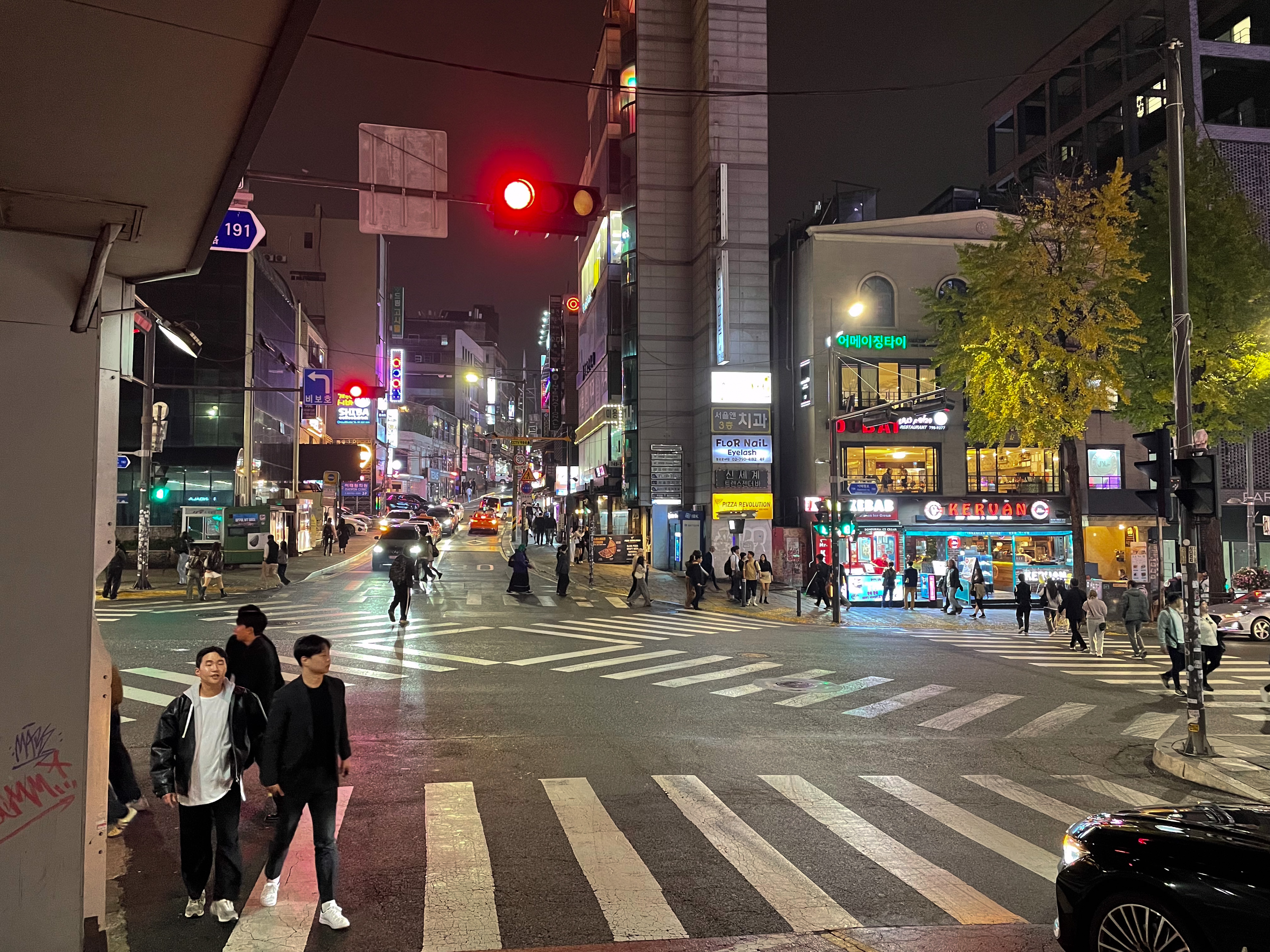
Itaewon intersection

Seoul Central Mosque

Itaewon, along with neighborhoods and attractions like Hongdae, Insadong, and Seoul Tower, is one of the most popular places in Seoul for tourists. As Seoul's "international district", it is known for serving a variety of cuisines from all over the world, many of which are not widely available in South Korea. All That Jazz, the oldest active jazz club in the country, is located in Itaewon. Itaewon Books, the oldest English-language secondhand bookstore in the city, can also be found there.

Itaewon includes Seoul's gay village, known as Homo Hill. Despite the taboo nature of homosexuality in South Korea, people can express themselves openly within the neighborhood.

Seoul Central Mosque, opened in 1976, is also loosely considered to be part of Itaewon, though it is legally situated within Hannam-dong.

== Incidents ==
=== COVID-19 outbreak ===
During the COVID-19 pandemic, Itaewon was a source of a major disease cluster traced back from over 130 confirmed cases. South Korean media began focusing on the neighborhood after public health authorities announced that a man who later tested positive for the coronavirus visited several establishments in the area on May 2. The scrutiny brought unwanted attention to the LGBTQ community.

=== 2022 crowd crush ===
On October 29, 2022, a crowd crush occurred during a Halloween celebration. Over 150 people were confirmed dead and over 100 were injured. Of the confirmed dead, 26 were foreign nationals. The influx of visitors from all over the country as well as foreign nationals was potentially caused by pandemic restrictions being lifted after two years. It was reported that hotels in the area were booked well before the event, showing that large crowds were expected.

== In popular culture ==
Korean singer-songwriter JYP (Park Jin-young) and Yoo Se-yoon's hip-hop duo UV released the song "Itaewon Freedom" in April 2011. The title alludes to (and the lyrics celebrate) a common Korean perception of Itaewon's "open atmosphere", in contrast with conventional Korean culture, which is more conservative. The popularity of the song and its music video inspired a parody cover from the girl group Crayon Pop in 2013. Both videos were partially filmed on location in Itaewon.

The 2020 South Korean Netflix television series Itaewon Class is set in its namesake neighborhood. Visitors to Itaewon can visit the original DanBam pub, now called SeoulBam, which features dishes from the show, such as soft tofu stew and spicy stir-fried pork.

== Transportation ==
Itaewon is served by Seoul Subway Line 6 via Itaewon, Noksapyeong, and Hangangjin stations.

== See also ==
- Haebangchon
