= History of bridges =

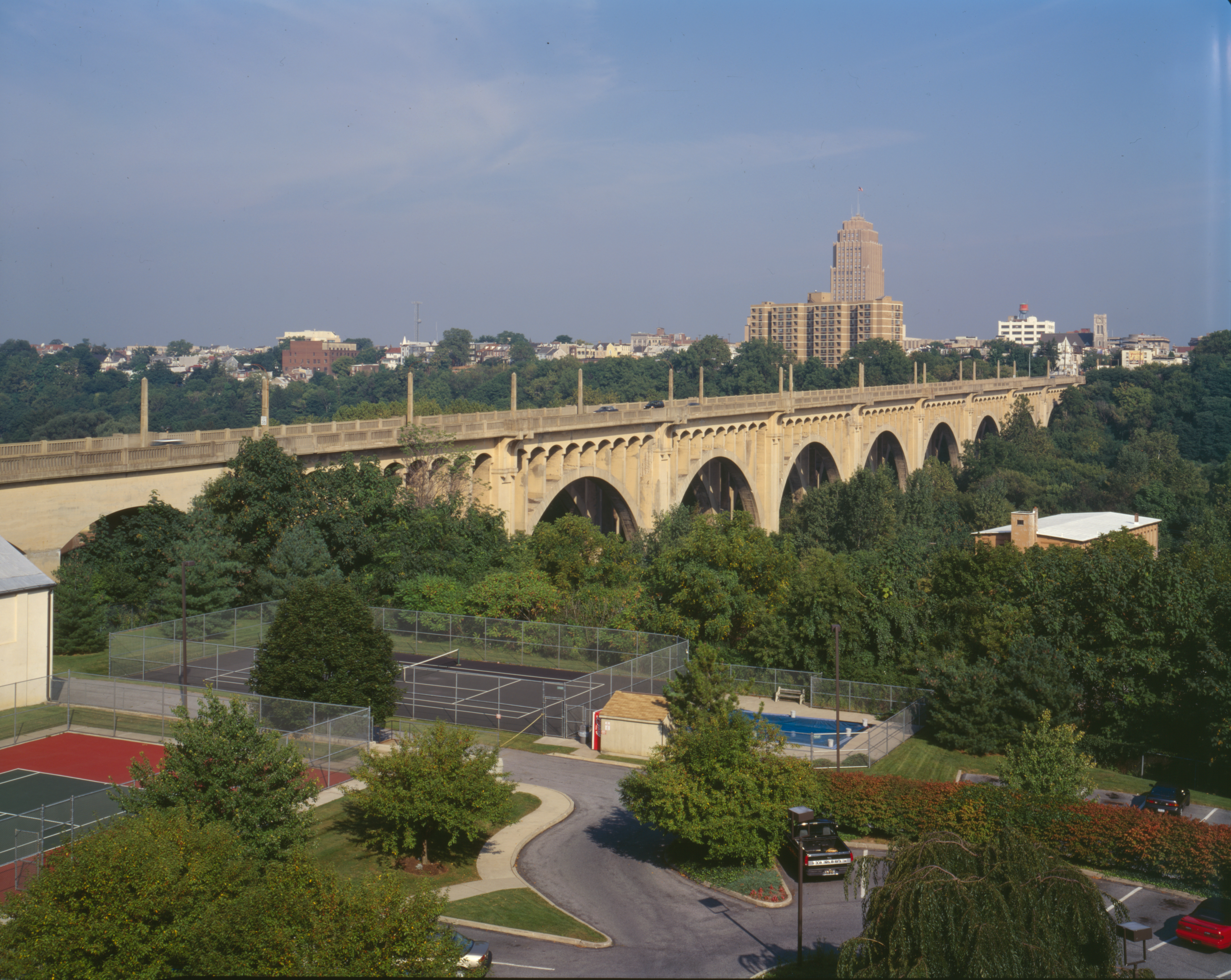
The Albertus L. Meyers Bridge in Allentown, Pennsylvania, U.S., "one of the earliest surviving examples of monumental, reinforced concrete construction", according to the American Society of Civil Engineers

The history of bridges dates back to prehistoric times, when logs or stepping stones were used to cross creeks and ravines. A bridge is a structure carrying a road, railroad, path, or canal across a river, lake, railroad, road, ravine, or other obstacle. It is constructed for the purpose of providing passage over an obstacle, which is otherwise difficult or impossible to cross. There are many different designs of bridges, each serving a particular purpose and applicable to different situations. Designs of bridges vary depending on factors such as the function of the bridge, the nature of the terrain where the bridge is constructed and anchored, the material used to make it, and the funds available to build it.

The earliest bridges were likely made with fallen trees and stepping stones. The Neolithic people built boardwalk bridges across marshland. The Arkadiko Bridge, dating from the 13th century BC, in the Peloponnese is one of the oldest arch bridges in existence and use.

== Ancient ==
The simplest and earliest types of bridge were stepping stones. Neolithic people also built a form of boardwalk across marshes; examples of such bridges include the Sweet Track and the Post Track in England, approximately 6000 years old. Ancient people would also have used log bridges consisting of logs that fell naturally or were intentionally felled or placed across streams. Some of the first human-made bridges with significant span were probably intentionally felled trees. Among the oldest timber bridges is the Holzbrücke Rapperswil-Hurden bridge that crossed upper Lake Zürich in Switzerland; prehistoric timber pilings discovered to the west of the Seedamm causeway date back to 1523 BC. The first wooden footbridge there led across Lake Zürich; it was reconstructed several times through the late 2nd century AD, when the Roman Empire built a 6-metre-wide (20 ft) wooden bridge to carry transport across the lake. Between 1358 and 1360, Rudolf IV, Duke of Austria, built a 'new' wooden bridge across the lake that was used until 1878; it was approximately 1,450 metres (4,760 ft) long and 4 metres (13 ft) wide. On 6 April 2001, a reconstruction of the original wooden footbridge was opened; it is also the longest wooden bridge in Switzerland.

The Arkadiko Bridge is one of four Mycenaean corbel arch bridges part of a former network of roads, designed to accommodate chariots, between the fort of Tiryns and town of Epidauros in the Peloponnese, in southern Greece. Dating to the Greek Bronze Age (13th century BC), it is one of the oldest arch bridges still in existence and use. Several intact, arched stone bridges from the Hellenistic era can be found in the Peloponnese.

== By area ==
=== Roman era ===
The greatest bridge builders of antiquity were the ancient Romans. The Romans built arch bridges and aqueducts that could stand in conditions that would damage or destroy earlier designs, some of which still stand today. An example is the Alcántara Bridge, built over the river Tagus, in Spain. The Romans also used cement, which reduced the variation of strength found in natural stone. One type of cement, called pozzolana, consisted of water, lime, sand, and volcanic rock. Brick and mortar bridges were built after the Roman era, as the technology for cement was lost (then later rediscovered).

=== India ===
In India, the Arthashastra treatise by Kautilya mentions the construction of dams and bridges. A Mauryan bridge near Girnar was surveyed by James Princep. The bridge was swept away during a flood, and later repaired by Puspagupta, the chief architect of emperor Chandragupta I. The use of stronger bridges using plaited bamboo and iron chain was visible in India by about the 4th century. A number of bridges, both for military and commercial purposes, were constructed by the Mughal administration in India.

=== China ===
Although large bridges of wooden construction existed in China at the time of the Warring States period, the oldest surviving stone bridge in China is the Zhaozhou Bridge, built from 595 to 605 AD during the Sui dynasty. This bridge is also historically significant as it is the world's oldest open-spandrel stone segmental arch bridge. European segmental arch bridges date back to at least the Alconétar Bridge (approximately 2nd century AD), while the enormous Roman era Trajan's Bridge (105 AD) featured open-spandrel segmental arches in wooden construction.

=== Korea ===
Woljeong Bridge in Gyeongju

It is said that bridges in Korea featuring full-scale and advanced technology and forms originated during the Three Kingdoms period. While most bridges of this era were constructed as part of state policy, some were built voluntarily to meet the specific needs of the villages themselves. Although the exact location of the Pyongyangju Bridge (평양주대교, 平壤州大橋) , completed in 413, is not known, the construction was carried out on a considerably large scale for the time. Several bridges, including Woljeong Bridge, were built near Seocheon Bridge in Gyeongju, North Gyeongsang Province.

=== Inca ===
Rope bridges, a simple type of suspension bridge, were used by the Inca civilization in the Andes mountains of South America, just prior to European colonization in the 16th century.

=== Africa ===
The Ashanti built bridges over streams and rivers. They were constructed by pounding four large forked tree trunks into the stream bed, placing beams along these forked pillars, then positioning cross-beams that were finally covered with four to six inches of dirt.

== 18th century ==
During the 18th century, there were many innovations in the design of timber bridges by Hans Ulrich Grubenmann, Johannes Grubenmann, as well as others. The first book on bridge engineering was written by Hubert Gautier in 1716. A major breakthrough in bridge technology came with the erection of the Iron Bridge in Shropshire, England in 1779. It used cast iron for the first time as arches to cross the river Severn. With the Industrial Revolution in the 19th century, truss systems of wrought iron were developed for larger bridges, but iron does not have the tensile strength to support large loads. With the advent of steel, which has a high tensile strength, much larger bridges were built, many using the ideas of Gustave Eiffel.

== Covered bridges ==
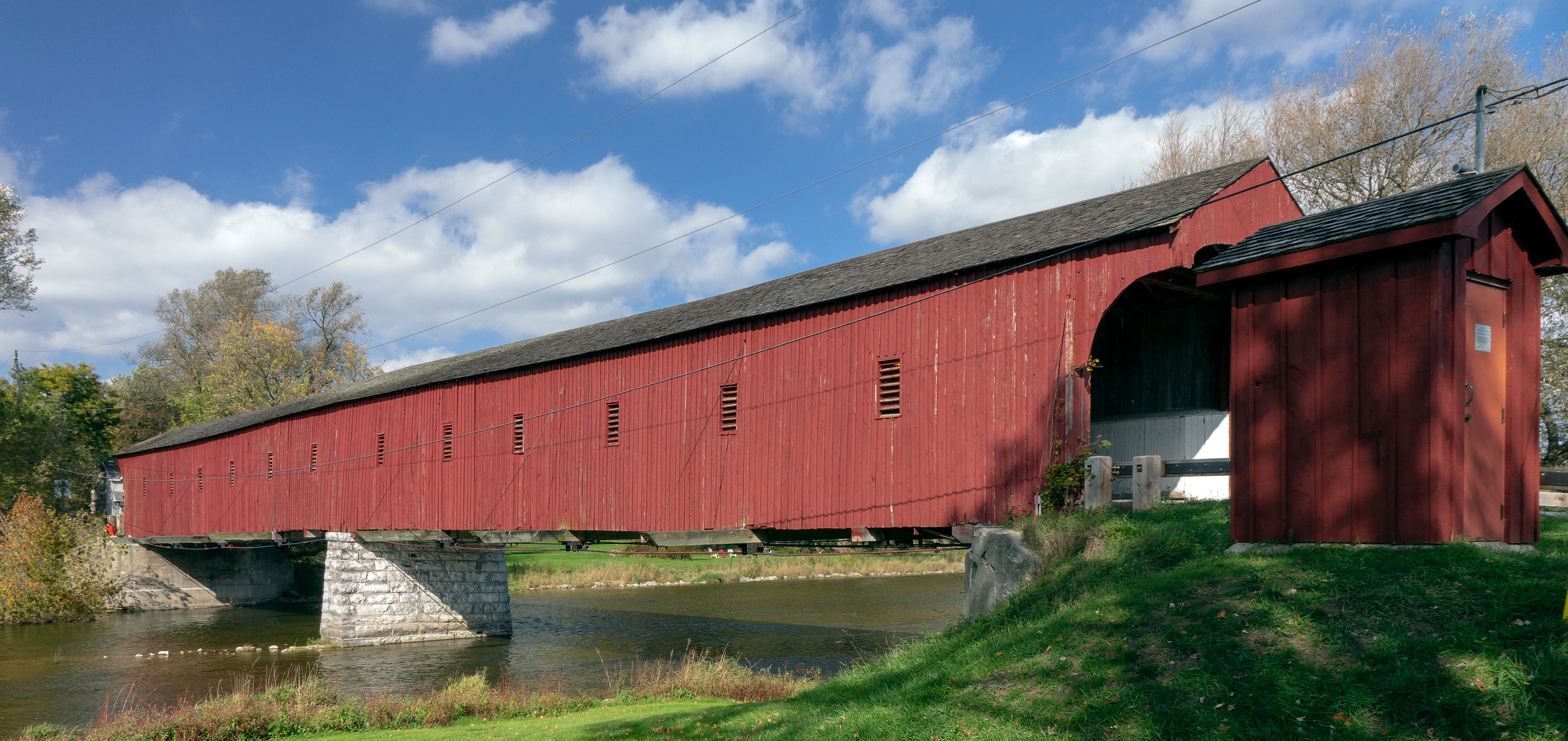
A covered bridge in West Montrose, Ontario, Canada

In Canada and the United States, numerous timber covered bridges were built in the late 1700s to the late 1800s, reminiscent of earlier designs in Germany and Switzerland. Some covered bridges were also built in Asia. In later years, some were partly made of stone or metal but the trusses were usually still made of wood; in the United States, there were three styles of trusses, the Queen Post, the Burr Arch and the Town Lattice. Hundreds of these structures still stand in North America. They were brought to the attention of the general public in the 1990s by the novel, movie and play The Bridges of Madison County.

== Steel bridges ==
In 1927, welding pioneer Stefan Bryła designed the first welded road bridge in the world, the Maurzyce Bridge which was later built across the river Słudwia at Maurzyce near Łowicz, Poland in 1929. In 1995, the American Welding Society presented the Historic Welded Structure Award for the bridge to Poland.

== Etymology ==
The Oxford English Dictionary traces the origin of the word bridge to an Old English word brycg, of the same meaning.

The Oxford English Dictionary also notes that there is some suggestion that the word can be traced directly back to Proto-Indo-European *bʰrēw-. However, they also note that "this poses semantic problems."

The origin of the word for the card game of the same name is unknown, but may be from folk etymology.
