= Gyochon Traditional Village =

Folk village in Gyeongju, South Korea

Gyochon Traditional Village 교촌마을
- Folk village
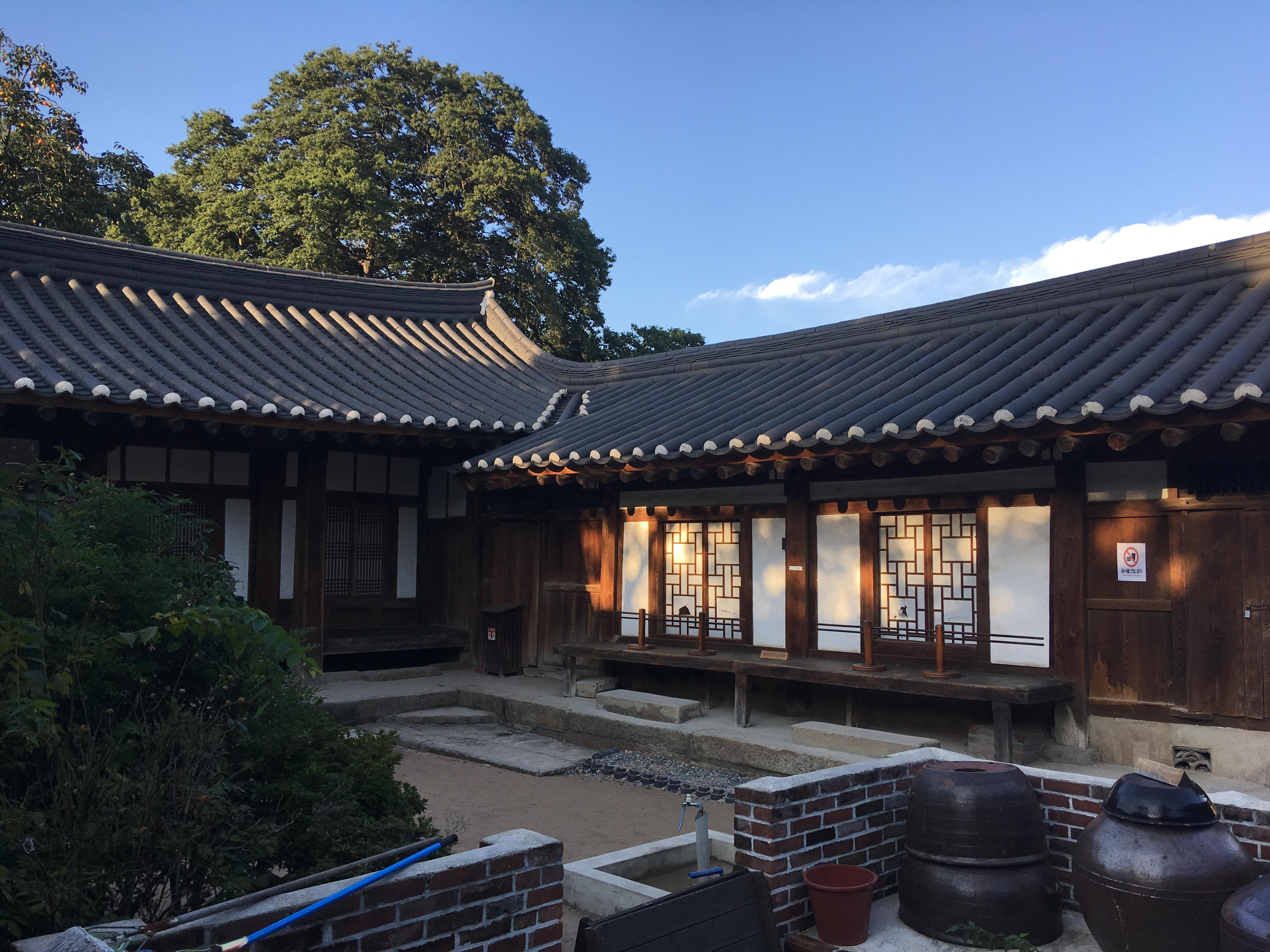
- Part of the Choe Jun house in the village (2018)
- Interactive map of Gyochon Traditional Village
- Coordinates: 35°49′51″N 129°12′58″E
- Country: South Korea
- Province: North Gyeongsang Province
- City: Gyeongju

Gyochon Traditional Village (Korean: 교촌마을) is a Korean folk village in Gyeongju, South Korea.

The village hosts various events, including traditional Korean music performances.

The village contains the historic Choe Jun House, the home of a major aristocratic family. The traditional Korean rice wine Gyeongju Gyo-dong beopju is brewed and sold in the village. That wine is a designated National Intangible Cultural Heritage of South Korea.

== See also ==
- Woljeonggyo – adjacent recreated bridge
- Gyerim – nearby woodland
- Wolseong Palace – nearby former palace
- Hwangnidan-gil – nearby shopping street
