= L'Autrichienne (film) =

- Directed by: Pierre Granier-Deferre
- Screenplay by: Alain Decaux; André Castelot
- Produced by: Raymond Danon
- Starring: Ute Lemper; Patrick Chesnais; Daniel Mesguich
- Cinematography: Pascal Lebègue
- Edited by: Jean Ravel
- Music by: Didier Vasseur
- Production companies: Danon Audiovisuel; Lira Films; Paradise Productions
- Distributed by: Neuf de Cœur
- Release date: 19 September 1990
- Running time: 98 minutes
- Country: France
- Language: French

L'Autrichienne is a 1990 French film directed by Pierre Granier-Deferre, released in 1990.

== Synopsis ==
The film depicts the last days of Marie-Antoinette of Austria, played by Ute Lemper, showing her trial and execution. It was directed during the celebrations of the bicentenary of the French Revolution. With a script written by Alain Decaux and André Castelot based on the minutes from the trial of the Queen, L'Autrichienne is for the most part a closed hearing with scenes of the trial and at the Conciergerie, punctuated by flash-back sequences.

== Cast ==
- Ute Lemper : Marie Antoinette
- Patrick Chesnais : Herman
- Daniel Mesguich : Fouquier-Tinville
- Philippe Leroy : D'Estaing
- Rufus : Girard
- Pierre Clémenti : Hébert
- Paul Le Person : Simon
- Isabelle Nanty : Queen Milliot
- Vincent Grass : Roussillon
