= Ute Lemper =

German singer and actress

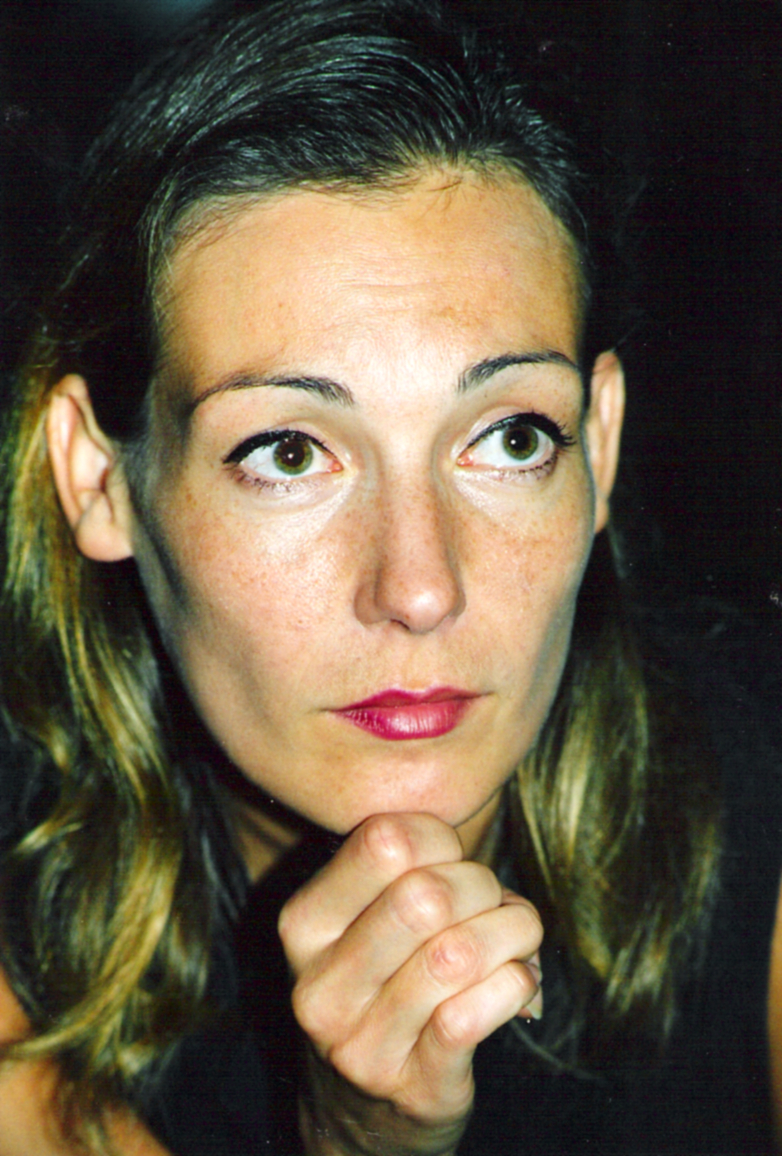

Background information
- Born: Ute Gertrud Lemper; 4 July 1963 (age 63); Münster, West Germany
- Genre: Cabaret
- Occupations: Singer, actress
- Years active: 1983–present
- Label: Decca/Universal Classics
- Website: utelemper.com

Ute Gertrud Lemper (German pronunciation: [ˈuːtə ˈlɛmpɐ]; born 4 July 1963) is a German singer and actress. Her roles in musicals include playing Sally Bowles in the original Paris production of Cabaret, for which she won the 1987 Molière Award for Best Newcomer, and Velma Kelly in the revival of Chicago in both London and New York, which won her the 1998 Olivier Award for Best Actress in a Musical.

== Biography ==
Born in Münster, (Germany), Ute Gertrude Lemper was raised in a Roman Catholic family. She joined the jazz-rock music group known as the Panama Drive Band at the age of 16. Later, she graduated from the Dance Academy in Cologne and the Max Reinhardt Seminary Drama School in Vienna.

Her diverse credits include musicals, such as her breakthrough role in the original Viennese cast of Cats, the title role in Peter Pan, a recreation of the Marlene Dietrich-created Lola in The Blue Angel, the original European Sally Bowles in a Paris production of Cabaret, and Velma Kelly in Chicago (Lemper has played the role of Velma Kelly in Chicago in both London and New York, winning the Laurence Olivier Award for her performance in London). She also dubbed the singing voices of Ariel in Disney's The Little Mermaid and Esmeralda in The Hunchback of Notre Dame for German-speaking audiences.

In 1991, Lemper participated in the Sanremo Music Festival with a song named "The Photograph", written by Italian songwriter Enzo Jannacci. A painter in the neoclassical style, Lemper has created paintings that have been showcased in numerous galleries.

Lemper, a mother of four, resides on the Upper West Side section of Manhattan in New York City, and performs worldwide. Her autobiography was published in Berlin in 1995; she has also authored several journal articles.

=== Film and television work ===
She starred as Marie Antoinette for L'Autrichienne (1989, directed by Pierre Granier-Deferre), and subsequently appeared in films including Prorva, Bogus, Jean Galmot Prospero's Books, Appetite and Prêt-à-Porter (in the latter appearing in a well-publicised nude scene filmed while she was pregnant, and she received National Board of Review for Ensemble Cast award). She has contributed to the soundtracks of numerous films, including The Voyager, Kissing Jessica Stein and Appetite.

In 2007, Lemper was a juror in Let's Dance, the German version of Dancing with the Stars.

== Recording ==
Lemper, named Billboard's Crossover Artist of the Year for 1993/1994, is a prolific recording artist, appearing on numerous cast recordings and compilation concerts, including Roger Waters' The Wall concert in 1990. As a solo artist, her extensive discography includes ubiquitously well-reviewed interpretations of Kurt Weill's compositions from the late 1980s, in addition to German cabaret songs, which were very political songs sung in underground locations in 1930s Berlin and elsewhere. She recorded Illusions in 1992, devoted to the songs of Marlene Dietrich and Édith Piaf. She has recorded numerous pop albums, variously in English, French, and German. Punishing Kiss (2000) featured songs written especially for her by the likes of Scott Walker, Nick Cave, Tom Waits, Elvis Costello, Philip Glass, and Neil Hannon, the latter of whom performed with her on two of the album's tracks. Lemper is known for wild interpretations on discs like the Sondheim tribute City of Strangers, containing a particularly mannered version of the Elaine Stritch-popularized song "The Ladies Who Lunch". In 1998, a Lemper compilation, All That Jazz: The Best of Ute Lemper, was released. In 2003 and 2006, Lemper's songwriting talents were shown on her discs from those years as she moved from being an interpretive singer to a singer-songwriter.

== Discography ==
- Cats (original German cast recording, 1983)
- Ute Lemper singt Kurt Weill (1987)
- Life is a Cabaret (1987)
- Ute Lemper Sings Kurt Weill (1988)
- Starlight Express (original German cast recording, 1988)
- Crimes of the Heart (1989)
- Die Dreigroschenoper (1990)
- The Seven Deadly Sins (1990)
- The Wall – Live in Berlin by Roger Waters - Sings on The Thin Ice and The Trial (1990)
- Arielle, die Meerjungfrau (1990)
- Prospero's Books (1991)
- Ute Lemper Live: Ihre Großen Tournee-Erfolge (1991)
- The Michael Nyman Songbook (1991)
- Homo Faber (1991)
- Guarda La Fotografia (1991)
- Illusions (1992)
- Komisch' Wetter (1992)
- Ute Lemper Sings Kurt Weill – Volume 2 (1993)
- Espace Indécent (1993)
- Portrait of Ute Lemper (1995)
- City of Strangers: Songs by Sondheim, Prévert... (1995)
- Die Eisprinzessin (1995)
- Der Glöckner von Notre-Dame (1996)
- Berlin Cabaret Songs (versions in English and German, 1996/1997)
- Nuits Étranges (1997)
- All That Jazz: The Best of Ute Lemper (1998)
- Chicago (London cast recording, 1998)
- Kurt Gerrons Karussell (1999)
- Punishing Kiss (2000)
- But One Day... (2002, Decca/Universal Classics)
- Blood & Feathers: Live from the Café Carlyle (2005)
- Between Yesterday and Tomorrow (2009)
- Paris Days, Berlin Nights (2012)
- Forever: The Love Poems of Pablo Neruda (2013)
- The 9 Secrets (based on texts from Paulo Coelho's book "Manuscript Found in Accra") (2015)
- Rendezvous With Marlene (2020)
- Time Traveler (2023)
- Pirate Jenny (2025)

== Filmography ==
=== Film ===
Year	Title	Role
1985	Drei gegen Drei	Marianne
1990	L'Autrichienne	Marie Antoinette
1990	Jean Galmot, aventurier	Arlette Simon
1991	Prospero's Books	Ceres
1991	Pierre qui brûle	Hanna
1992	Coupable d'innocence ou Quand la raison dort	Catherine Gless
1992	Prorva	Anna
1994	Bogus	Babette
1994	Prêt-à-Porter	Albertine
1997	Combat de fauves	Carole Valmer
1997	River Made to Drown In	Eva Kline
1998	Appetite	Greta
2014	Magic in the Moonlight	Cabaret Singer
2024	Eternal Visionary	
