= Homo Hill =

Neighborhood in Itaewon, Seoul, South Korea

"Homo Hill," also known as "The Hill" or "LGBTQ Street", is an informal name for an LGBTQ+ neighborhood in Itaewon, Seoul, South Korea. It is occupied by numerous LGBTQ+ establishments and is considered a safe space for LGBTQ+-identifying people. Homo Hill branches out of the entertainment area for U.S. military soldiers established during the time of the Korean War, which was known as "Hooker Hill".

Itaewon is also home to a number of ethnic minority groups.

== History ==
In the creation of modern Itaewon, many of the people who contributed had goals to make this space more liberal than other areas in South Korea that were made by older, more conservative generations.

With the introduction of the Korean War (1950s), U.S. military bases were created in South Korea, and more specifically, in close proximity to modern Itaewon. With the U.S. military base so close by, Itaewon became a recreational space of U.S. soldiers, which sparked an increase in new bars and clubs. In these spaces were also the presence of 'foreigners only' clubs, along with a few gay clubs, which contributed to the perception of the area as a "sexually and morally contaminated space."

The name "Homo Hill" is not an official name for the space. Some believe the term "homo" is derogatory and so a majority of people in South Korea refer to the street as either "The Hill" or "LGBTQ Street". In addition, the terminology behind "Homo Hill" makes it seem to only encompass those who identify as homosexual, thereby excluding the rest of the LGBTQ+-identifying individuals.

== Setting ==
"Homo Hill" is one street, more specifically, a 360-foot long alleyway in the Itaewon district. This alleyway consists of approximately 10 to 15 LGBTQ+ bars, clubs, as well as other establishments. The street is known for its colorful graffitied walls and grounds, as well as its street art that signifies the acceptance of LGBTQ+ individuals.

== Diversity ==
The district of Itaewon is very diverse and is home to many minority groups in a set up similar to the ethnic enclaves found in other countries. These minorities include Muslims, LGBTQ+ individuals, and Nigerians. Along with "Homo Hill," Itaewon contains "Islamic Street" which includes two mosques, as well as "African Street" in which many that belong to the Nigerian community live and socialize.
