= Gyeongnidan-gil =

Street in Seoul, South Korea

- Hoenamu-ro

Hoenamu-ro
- Hangul: 회나무로
- Hanja: 회나무路
- RR: Hoenamu-ro
- MR: Hoenamu-ro

Gyeongnidan-gil
- Hangul: 경리단길
- Hanja: 經理團길
- RR: Gyeongnidan-gil
- MR: Kyŏngnidan-kil

Hoenamu-ro (Korean: 회나무로), informally called Gyeongnidan-gil (경리단길), is a street in Itaewon-dong, Yongsan District, Seoul, South Korea, as well as the area surrounding the main street. The area is known for its restaurants, bars and cafes.

A wall plaque on Hoenamu-ro explaining the origin of the name Gyeongnidan-gil

The name "Gyeongnidan" was derived from the former Republic of Korea Army Financial Management Corps (Yukgun jungang gyeongnidan), which is now the Armed Forces Financial Management Corps.

Early on, it became a residential area for foreigners under the influence of the U.S. troops stationed nearby, and gradually gained popularity by attracting restaurants and bars that suited their preferences. There are now pubs, bars, coffee shops and restaurants lined up.

== See also ==
- Hwangnidan-gil in Gyeongju
