= Korea Open Government License =

Copyright license issued by South Korea

- Publisher: Ministry of Culture, Sports and Tourism
- Published: 2012
- Website: www.kogl.or.kr

Korea Open Government License (KOGL, Korean: 공공누리; RR: gong-gong nuri) is one of the Government of South Korea's copyright licenses that allows the distribution of copyrighted materials.

Before this system, there was no standard system that determined the copyright of public records. Instead, users were required to obtain permission for use by inquiry. The license was developed by the Ministry of Culture, Sports and Tourism to simplify this process.

== Types ==
The license scheme is similar in concept to the Creative Commons licenses. KOGL has six types, including an additional condition for AI training. Type 0 and Type 1 are compatible with the open definition. (Note: a document published by the Open Knowledge Foundation, summarised as: "Open means anyone can freely access, use, modify, and share for any purpose (subject, at most, to requirements that preserve provenance and openness)") In all cases, users must indicate the source and license of the work, and obey any additional restrictions imposed by the type of license.

Korea Open Government License Types
Type	Icon	Attribution required	Commercial use	Distribution of derived works	Notes
0		No	permitted	permitted	
1		Yes	permitted	permitted	
2		Yes	not permitted	permitted	
3		Yes	permitted	not permitted	
4		Yes	not permitted	not permitted	
AI		No	permitted	permitted	Used in conjunction with Type 1–4. Restricted to AI training only.

When English labels for the three symbols (all present in type 4) are used, they are "BY", "NC" and "ND" respectively.

=== Retired licenses ===
Retired licenses
Type	Icon	Attribution required	Commercial use	Distribution of derived works	Notes
Expired public works		No	permitted	permitted	Retired in favor of Type 0
