= Woljeonggyo =

Bridge in Gyeongju, South Korea

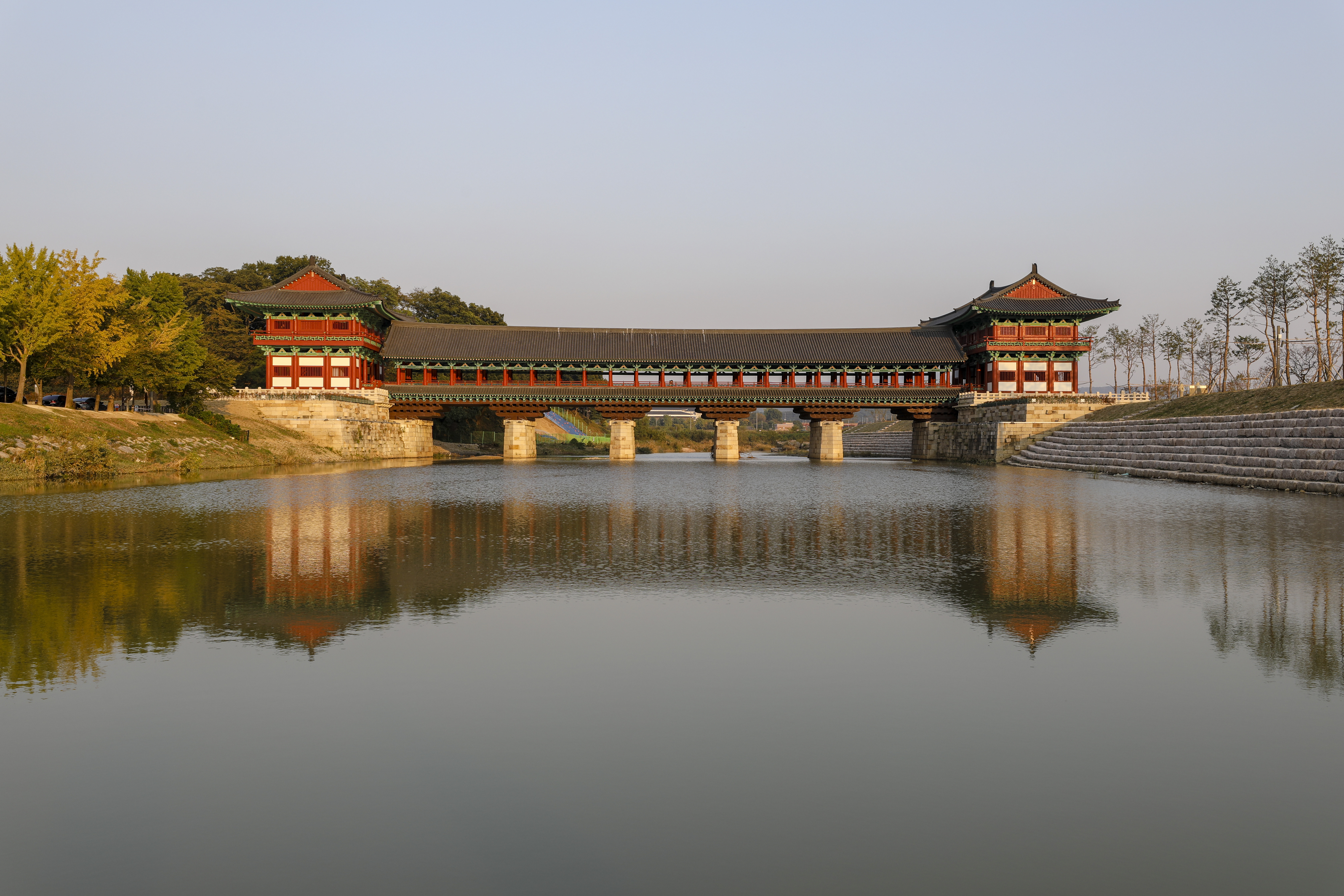
- Woljeonggyo (2018)
- Coordinates: 35.8294°N 129.2181°E

Characteristics
- Total length: 66.15 m (217.0 ft)

History
- Built: 760 A.D. (Korean calendar)
- Rebuilt: 2008–2013 (first phase); 2016–2018 (second phase)

Historic Sites of South Korea
- Designated: 2004-11-27
- Part of: Chunyanggyo and Woljeonggyo Bridge Sites, Gyeongju
- Reference no.: 457

Korean name
- Hangul: 월정교
- Hanja: 月精橋
- RR: Woljeonggyo
- MR: Wŏlchŏnggyo

Location
- Interactive map of Woljeonggyo

Woljeonggyo (Korean: 월정교; Hanja: 月精橋) is a covered bridge in Gyeongju, South Korea. Originally built in 760 A.D. (Note: According to the Korean calendar (lunisolar)) during the Unified Silla period and lost during the Joseon period, it was rebuilt and opened in April 2018.

On November 27, 2004, the sites of and its counterpart former bridge Iljeonggyo were designated Historic Sites of South Korea.

== History ==
The bridge is mentioned in the historical text Samguk sagi as having been completed in 760 A.D. (per the Korean calendar). Its original form was estimated to be 60.57 m (198.7 ft) long. Based on analysis of the remains of the bridge, it is believed that there used to be towers at each end of the bridge. The bridge was completed around the same time as the bridge Iljeonggyo (일정교), which was nearby and believed to be similar in design.

Research and excavations on the topic of the bridge were conducted from November 26, 1984 to September 8, 1986. These investigations concluded that there was a wooden bridge at the original site. The first phase of construction work to rebuild the bridge lasted from 2008 to 2013. It resulted in a 66.15 m (217.0 ft) long bridge without the gatehouses. A second phase of construction from April 2016 to April 2018 resulted in the completion of gatehouses.

The second floors of the reconstructed gatehouses are open to the public and have exhibits on the history of the bridge. It has videos and displays on how the bridges were reconstructed. Woljeonggyo was selected as one of the '100 Best Tourist Attractions in Korea 2025-2026' by the Ministry of Culture, Sports and Tourism, recognizing its historic value.

== Description ==
The bridge is equipped with lights that illuminate it at night. It is considered scenic during that time. Events have been held near the bridge, with food and cultural performances.

== Gallery ==
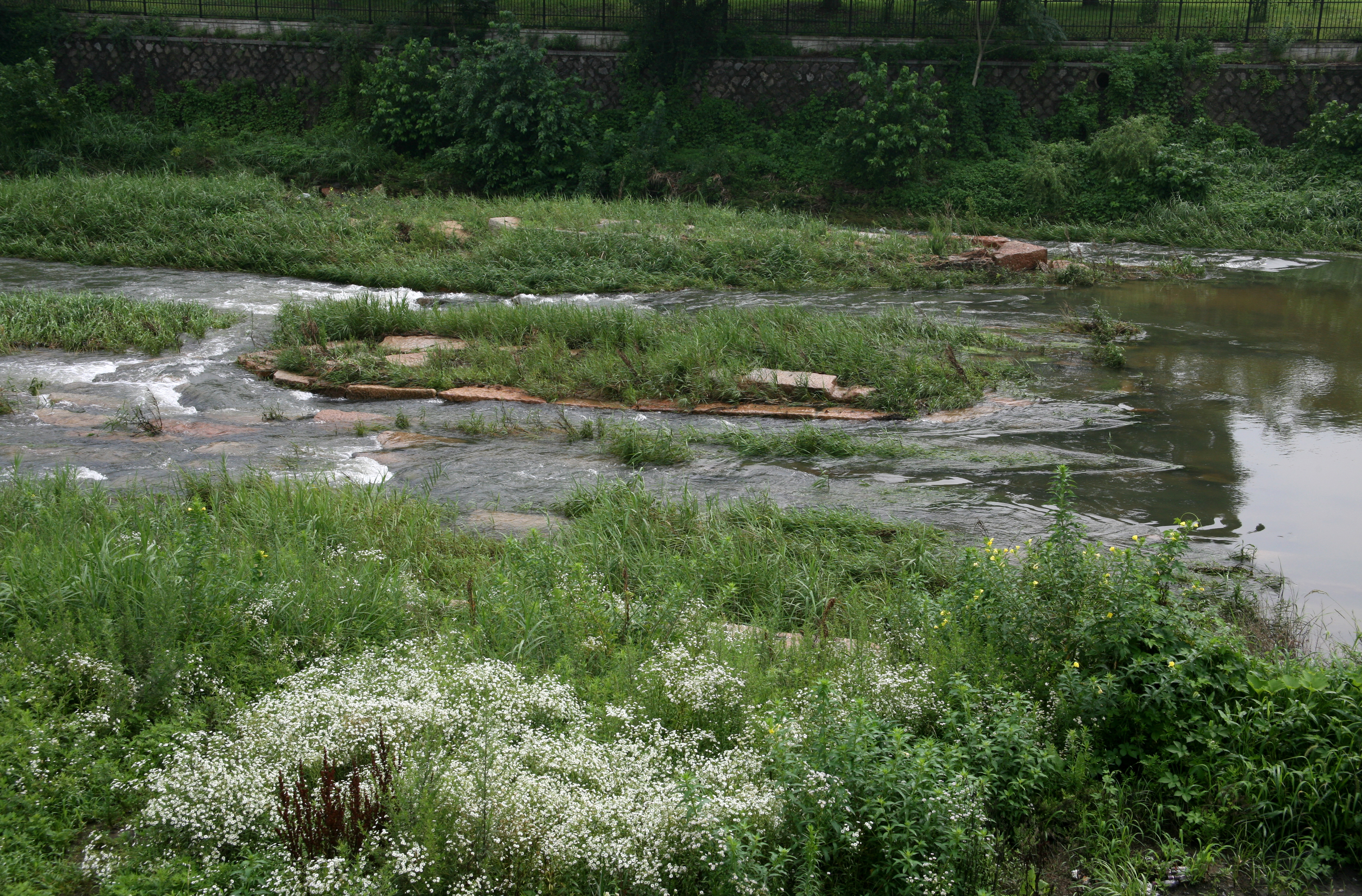
The former site of the bridge, before reconstruction began (2009)

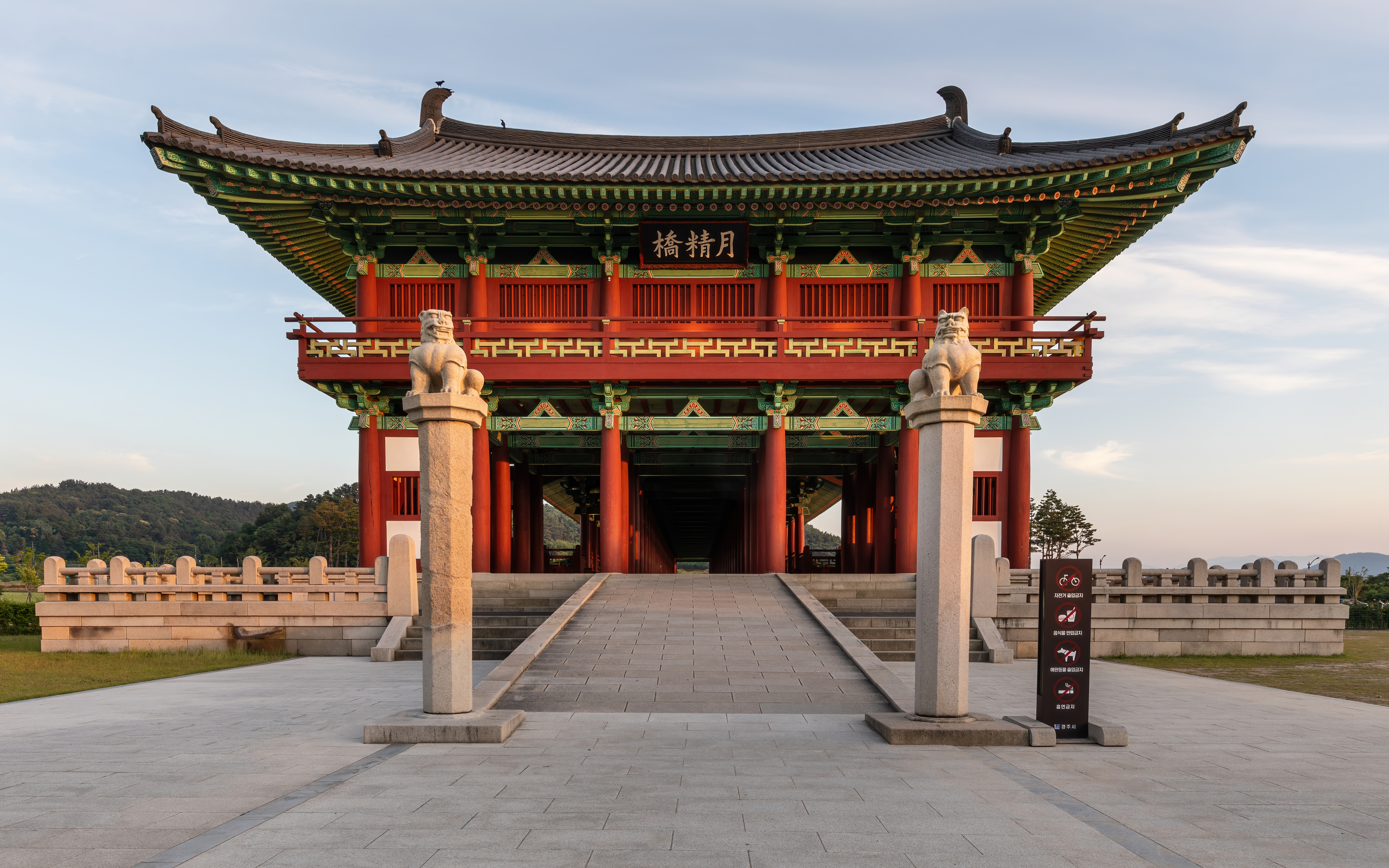
The northern side of the bridge (2024)

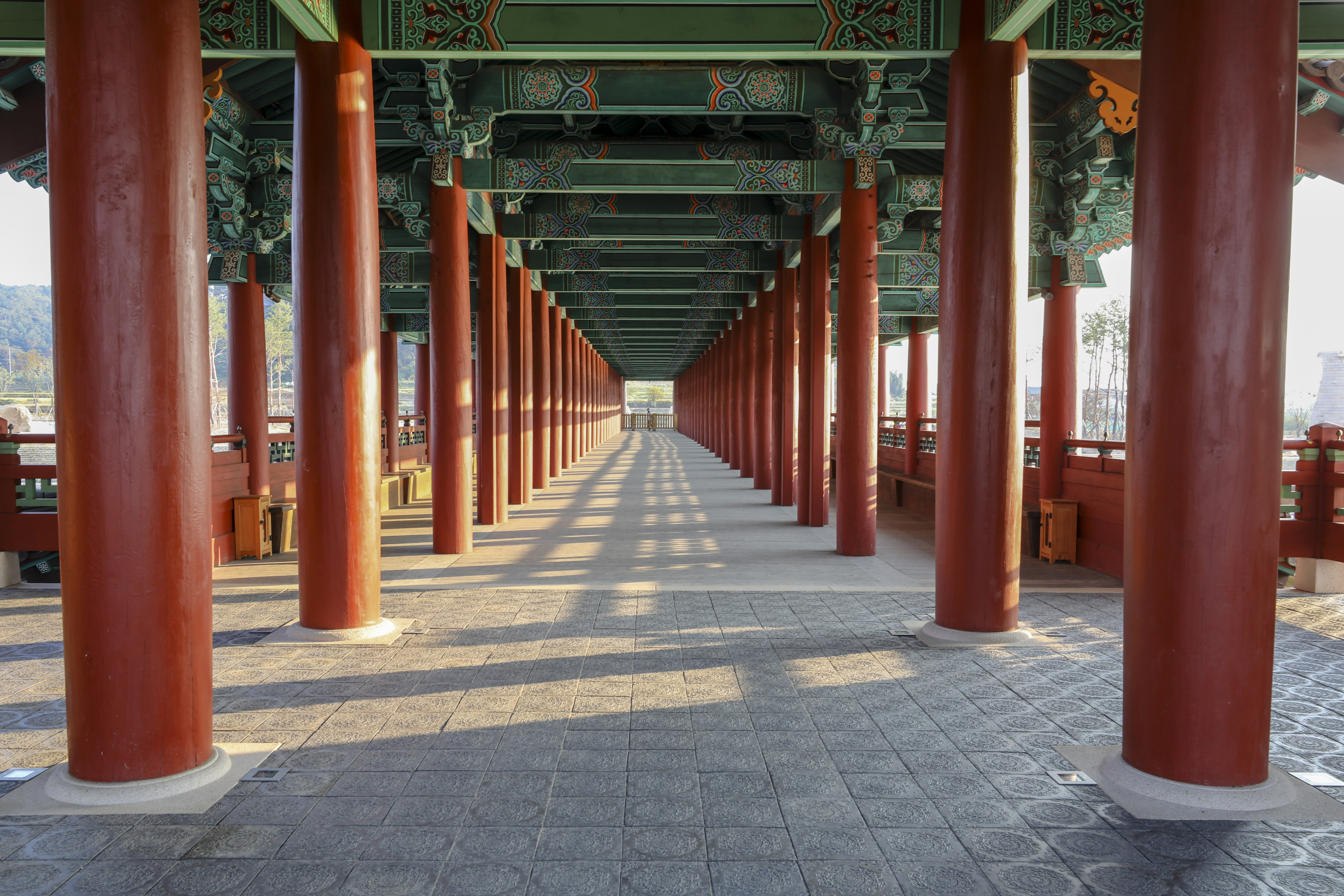
On the bridge (2018)

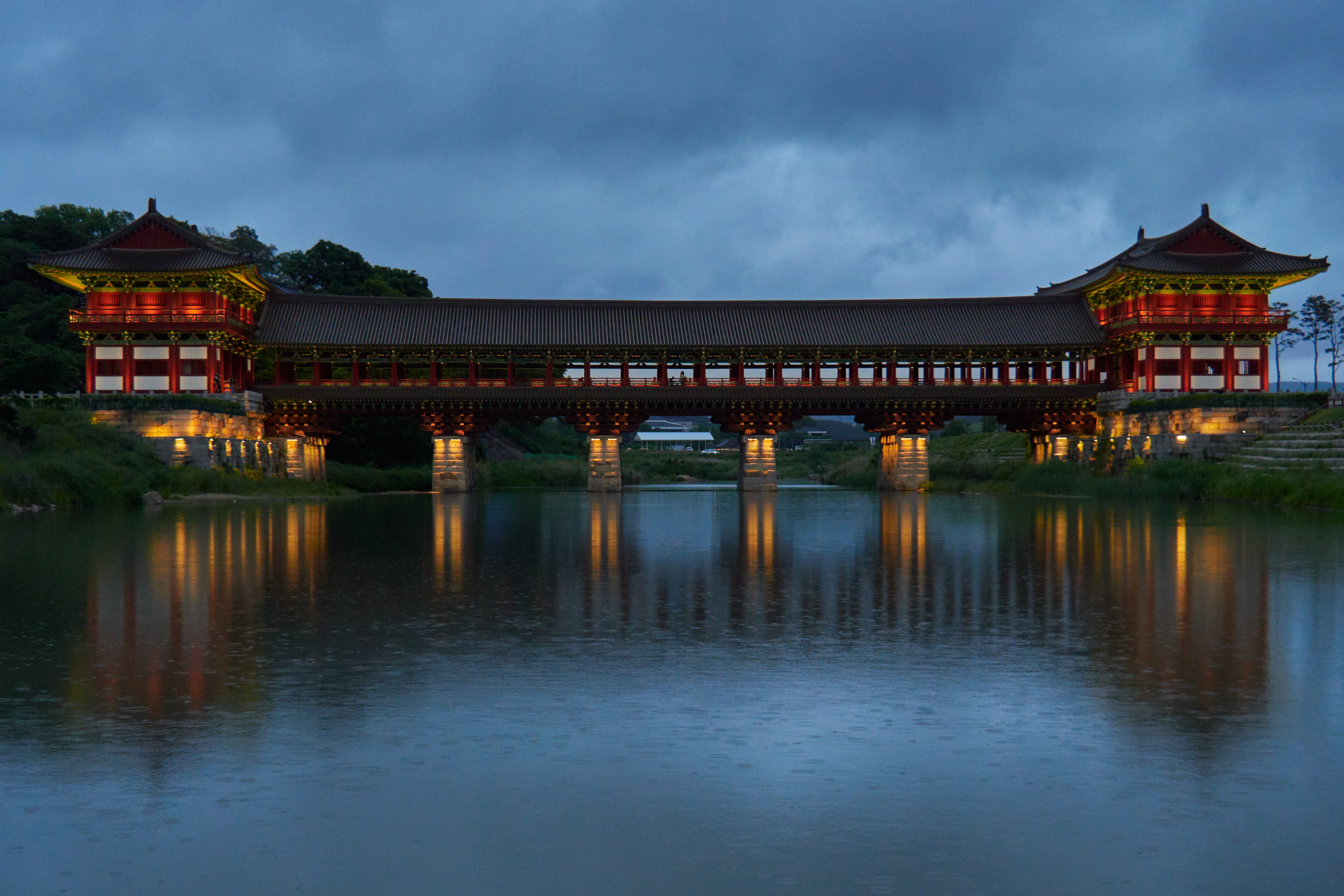
At blue hour (2024)

== See also ==
- Gyochon Traditional Village – adjacent folk village
- Gyerim – nearby woodland
- Wolseong Palace – nearby former palace
- Hwangnidan-gil – nearby shopping street
