= Hwangnidan-gil =

Shopping street in Gyeongju, South Korea

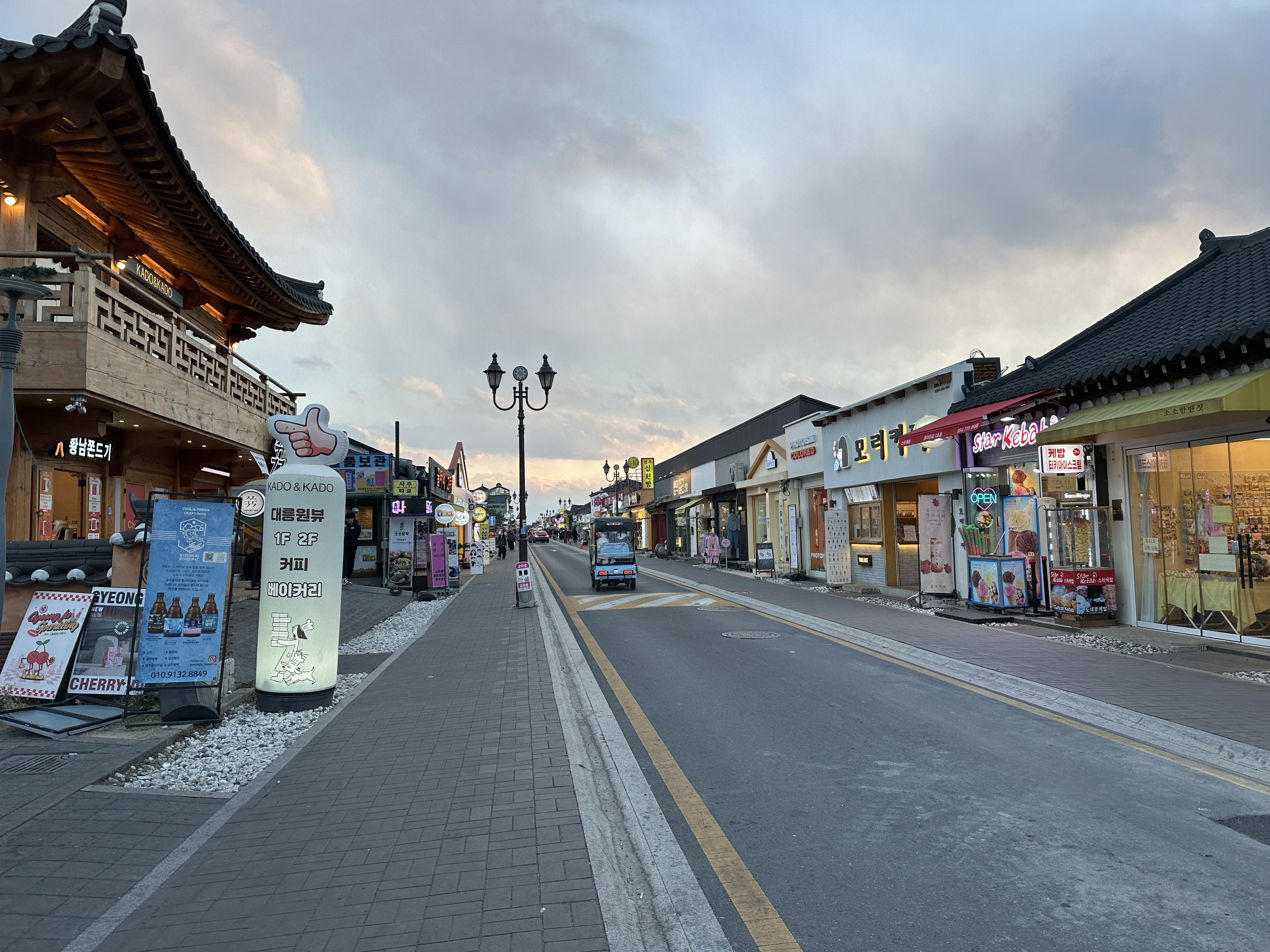
- Hwangnidan-gil (January 2025)
- Interactive map of Hwangnidan-gil
- Former name: Hwangnam Keungil
- Namesake: Hwangnam-dong and Gyeongnidan-gil
- Length: 1.5 km (0.93 mi)
- Coordinates: 35.8375°N 129.2097°E

Korean name
- Hangul: 황리단길
- Hanja: 皇理團길
- RR: Hwangnidan-gil
- MR: Hwangnidan-kil

Hwangnidan-gil (Korean: 황리단길; Hanja: 皇理團길) is a shopping street in Gyeongju, South Korea. It was originally named Hwangnam Keungil (황남 큰길), and was later renamed using a combination of its neighborhood name "Hwangnam-dong" and "Gyeongnidan-gil" street in Seoul. It is one of the most significant tourist attractions in the city.

The street is lined with hanok, traditional Korean buildings. In 2023, it reportedly had 400 trendy shops, cafes, restaurants, and other businesses. These have made it popular with younger tourists. It has been described as having a "retro" feeling, with businesses evoking both old and new design elements and products.

== Description ==
The road is around 1.5 km (0.93 mi) long. The street was reportedly significantly congested with vehicle traffic until 2018. It was then made a one-way street and pedestrian access reportedly significantly improved. Other efforts were also made to make it more tourist friendly; power lines were made more organized and put underground instead of above. In 2020, the local government was reportedly considering making it a permanent pedestrian-only street.

Before 2015, the street was considered to have mostly shabby, older restaurants and houses. In late 2015, merchants began opening shops that attempted to appeal to younger people. In 2017, the nickname "Hwangnidan-gil" for the street went viral online; this name favorably compares it with Seoul's trendy Gyeongnidan-gil. In 2018, it had around 80 trendy shops. By 2023 it had around 400. The dish 10 won bread was first sold in Gyeongju in December 2019; variations of it then became popular throughout South Korea and in Japan as 10 yen bread.

It is one of the most popular tourist attractions in the city by a number of metrics. It was the most searched place in navigation apps in 2023. People stayed there on average for 93 minutes, compared to the second place entry of 78 minutes for the bridge Woljeonggyo and 40 minutes for the UNESCO World Heritage Site Seokguram. The street is also right next to a number of significant attractions in the city, including the Daereungwon tomb complex and Cheomseongdae observatory.
