= All That Jazz (jazz club) =

Music club in Seoul, South Korea

- 올댓재즈
- Interactive map of All That Jazz
- Address: 2F, 216, Itaewon-ro, Yongsan District, Seoul, South Korea
- Coordinates: 37.5347°N 126.9981°E
- Event: Jazz

Construction
- Opened: 1976

Website
- allthatjazz.kr

All That Jazz (Korean: 올댓재즈) is a jazz club in the Itaewon area of Yongsan District, Seoul, South Korea. It is the oldest active jazz club in the country, having been founded in 1976. It was originally located near the Hamilton Hotel, but in 2023 the club was relocated to a new space with a modern interior.

The club has been described as a "sacred place" (성지) for Korean jazz. It reportedly holds concerts 364 days of the year (excluding Memorial Day).
