= All That Jazz: The Best of Ute Lemper =

Greatest hits album by Ute Lemper
- Released: September 1, 1998
- Length: 78:40
- Producer: David Cunningham, Michael Haas, Randy Kerber, Simon Richmond, Jonny Dollar

All that Jazz: The Best of Ute Lemper is an album by the German singer Ute Lemper released September 1, 1998.

== Track listing ==
1. "All That Jazz" from Chicago (John Kander, Fred Ebb)
2. "Don't Tell Mama" from Cabaret (John Kander, Fred Ebb)
3. "Mon Légionnaire" (Raymond Asso, Marguerite Monnot)
4. "Whenever We Get Close (Appetite)"
5. "Careless Love Blues (Voyager)" (W.C. Handy, Martha E. Koenig, Spencer Williams)
6. "Die Moritat Von Mackie Messer (Mack the Knife)" (Bertolt Brecht)
7. "Alabama Song" (Kurt Weill, Bertolt Brecht)
8. "Nannas Lied (Nanna's Song)" (Bertolt Brecht)
9. "The Bilbao Song" (Kurt Weill, Bertolt Brecht)
10. "Surabaya Johnny" (Bertolt Brecht)
11. "Le Grand Lustucru" (Kurt Weill, Jacques Déval)
12. "My Ship" (Kurt Weill, Ira Gershwin)
13. "Want To Buy Some Illusions" (Friedrich Hollaender)
14. "They Call Me Naughty Lola/Ich Bin Die Fesche Lola" (Friedrich Hollaender)
15. "L'Accordéoniste" (Michel Emer)
16. "La Vie en Rose" (Edith Piaf, Marcel Louiguy, Mack David)
17. "Psalm" (Paul Celan)
18. "When the Special Girlfriend" (Mischa Spoliansky, Marcellus Schiffer)
19. "The Smart Set" (Mischa Spoliansky, Marcellus Schiffer)
20. "I Am a Vamp!" (Robert Klein, Mischa Spoliansky, Marcellus Schiffer)
