= Itaewon-dong =

Neighborhood of Yongsan District, Seoul, South Korea

- Aerial view of Itaewon-dong with N Seoul Tower and Namsan in the background

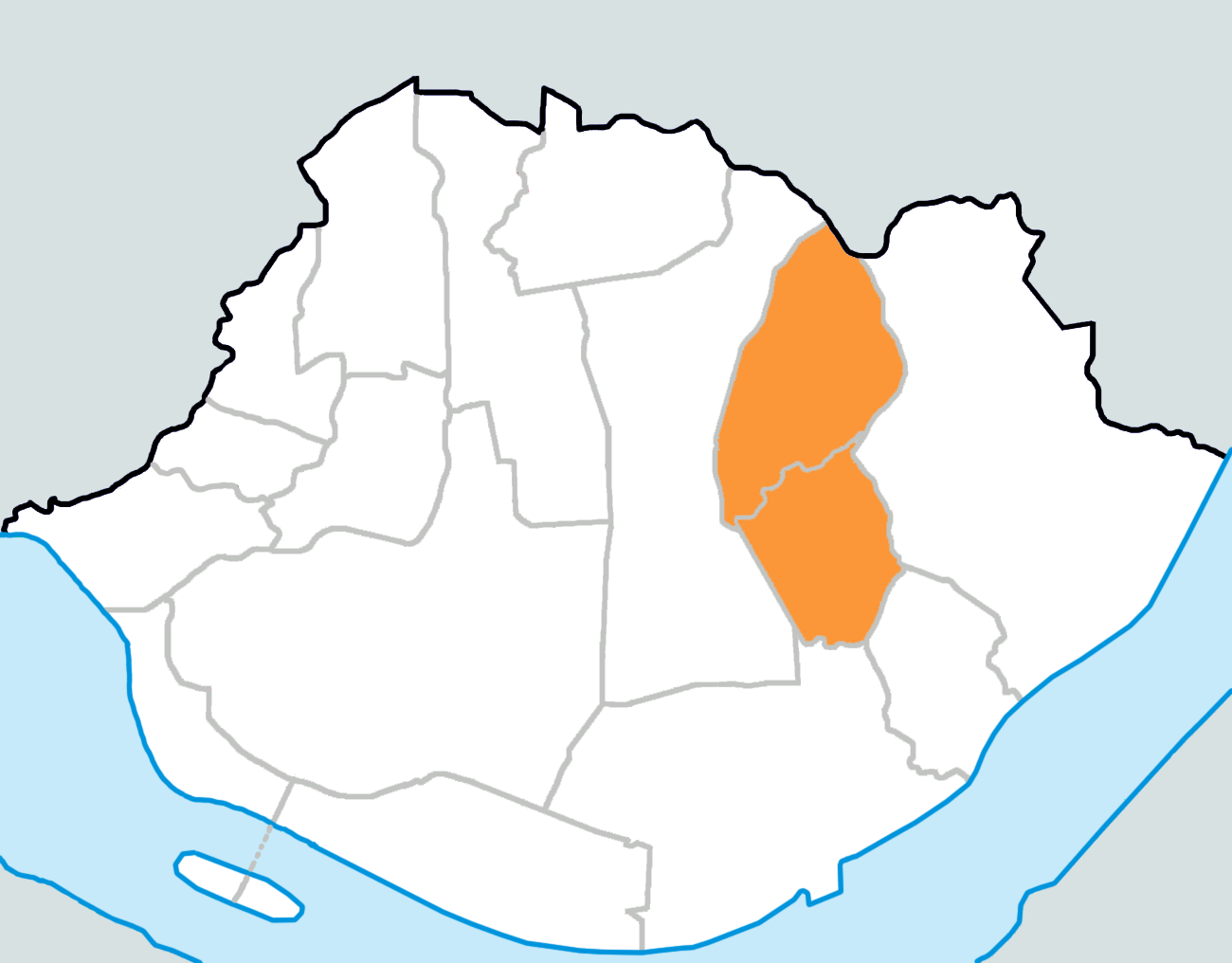
- Country: South Korea

Area
  - Total: 1.37 km^{2} (0.53 sq mi)

Population (August 2013)
  - Total: 19,193
  - Density: 14,000/km^{2} (36,300/sq mi)

Korean name
- Hangul: 이태원동
- Hanja: 梨泰院洞
- RR: Itaewon-dong
- MR: It'aewŏn-dong

Itaewon-dong (Korean: 이태원동) is a dong (neighborhood) of Yongsan District, Seoul, South Korea.

== Description ==
Itaewon is a melting pot of people from all over the world. Itaewon is well known as the most internationalized place in Seoul. For 50 years, it has attracted foreigners more than any other place in Seoul. At first, it served residential and commercial functions for American soldiers and foreign elites working in the embassies and transnational corporations due to the location of a US military base and most embassies in Korea. This historical condition draws over 2000 international residents to live in Itaewon from more than 80 countries. Due to these experiences, Itaewon has been the most common place to see foreigners. English is widely spoken here, unlike in other areas in Korea.

== Education ==
Schools located in Itaewon-dong:

- Itaewon Elementary School
- Bogwang Elementary School
- Seoul Digitech High School

== See also ==
- Administrative divisions of South Korea
